= 1999 St. Louis Rams season =

NFL team season

- Owner: Georgia Frontiere
- General manager: Dick Vermeil
- Head coach: Dick Vermeil
- Offensive coordinator: Mike Martz
- Defensive coordinator: Peter Giunta
- Home stadium: Trans World Dome

Results
- Record: 13–3
- Division place: 1st NFC West
- Playoffs: Won Divisional Playoffs (vs. Vikings) 49–37; Won NFC Championship (vs. Buccaneers) 11–6; Won Super Bowl XXXIV (vs. Titans) 23–16
- All-Pros: QB Kurt Warner (1st team); RB Marshall Faulk (1st team); WR Isaac Bruce (2nd team); OT Orlando Pace (1st team); DE Kevin Carter (1st team); CB Todd Lyght (2nd team); KR Tony Horne (2nd team)
- Pro Bowlers: QB Kurt Warner; RB Marshall Faulk; WR Isaac Bruce; OT Orlando Pace; DT D'Marco Farr; DE Kevin Carter; CB Todd Lyght
- Team MVP: Marshall Faulk
- Team ROY: Torry Holt

The 1999 St. Louis Rams season was the team's 62nd year with the National Football League (NFL) and the fifth season in St. Louis, Missouri. The Rams finished the regular season with a record of 13–3, and defeated the Tennessee Titans in Super Bowl XXXIV.

It was the team's first playoff appearance in St. Louis, their first since 1989, and their first division title since 1985. The Rams were undefeated at home for the first time since 1973. On the road, the Rams were 5–3.

In the post-season, they defeated the Minnesota Vikings by a score of 49–37 in the NFC Divisional Playoffs and went on to defeat the Tampa Bay Buccaneers 11–6 in the NFC Championship Game. These were the first NFL playoff games ever played in St. Louis. The Rams then won their first ever Super Bowl title, defeating the Tennessee Titans by a score of 23–16 in Super Bowl XXXIV. The game was played on January 30, 2000 at the Georgia Dome in Atlanta. It was also the franchise's first NFL championship since 1951, when the Rams played in Los Angeles. The Rams also became the first "dome-field" (indoor home games) team to win a Super Bowl. Having finished last in their division the previous season, the Rams also became the first "worst-to-first" team to win the Super Bowl. It would be the franchise's only Super Bowl win during the St. Louis era; their next title would come in 2021, five years after their return to Los Angeles.

It was the first season of the Rams' "Greatest Show on Turf" offense. The 1999 Rams remain one of only five teams in NFL history to score more than 30 points twelve separate times in a single season. (Note: The other five teams are the 2007 and 2011 New England Patriots, plus the 2013 Denver Broncos, and the 2018 Kansas City Chiefs) On defense, the Rams recorded seven interceptions returned for touchdowns, third most in NFL history. The 1999 Rams' +284 regular-season point differential is the highest of any Super Bowl championship team, and second-highest of any team since the AFL–NFL merger, after the 2007 New England Patriots.

The Rams were the third St. Louis–based pro sports team to win a major championship, joining the, then, nine-time World Series Champion St. Louis Cardinals of Major League Baseball and the 1957–58 St. Louis (now Atlanta) Hawks of the NBA. They would be followed by two more World Series championships by the St. Louis Cardinals and a championship by the St. Louis Blues in the 2019 Stanley Cup Finals which made St. Louis the eighth city to win a championship in each of the four major U.S. sports.

Quarterback Kurt Warner was the MVP in both the regular season and in Super Bowl XXXIV.

It was the final season the Rams wore their 1973–1999 uniforms that had been synonymous with their time in Los Angeles (they brought them back as their home uniform set beginning in 2018 after their return to Los Angeles). This season would start a period of strength for the Rams, as they would post a winning record in all but one season from this year to 2003. The 1999 Rams team ranked No. 11 on the 100 greatest teams of all time presented by the NFL on its 100th anniversary.

== Offseason ==
After a poor showing from the Rams offense in the previous 1998 season, Rams VP John Shaw suggested the Rams hire Redskins quarterbacks coach Mike Martz, and Vermeil and the team agreed. Martz advocated for the Rams to sign quarterback Trent Green from Washington, which the team did. This made Tony Banks expendable, and he was traded to the Ravens, which moved Kurt Warner from third-string to backup quarterback. VP Shaw also acquired Marshall Faulk from the Indianapolis Colts in exchange for two draft picks. The team also signed guard Adam Timmerman and linebacker Todd Collins, both of whom became starters.

=== NFL draft ===
1999 St. Louis Rams draft
Round	Pick	Player	Position	College	Notes
1	6	Torry Holt *	Wide receiver	NC State	
2	41	Dré Bly *	Cornerback	North Carolina	
3	68	Rich Coady	Safety	Texas A&M	
4	101	Joe Germaine	Quarterback	Ohio State	
5	145	Cameron Spikes	Guard	Texas A&M	
6	176	Lionel Barnes	Defensive end	Louisiana–Monroe	
7	252	Rodney Williams	Punter	Georgia Tech	
Und	Und	James Hodgins	Fullback	San Jose State	
Made roster * Made at least one Pro Bowl during career

== Personnel ==
=== Staff ===
1999 St. Louis Rams staff
Front office: Chairman – Georgia Frontiere; Vice chairman – Stan Kroenke; President – John Shaw; Senior vice president – Jay Zygmunt; General manager/President of football operations – Dick Vermeil; Vice president of football operations – Lynn Stiles; Senior vice president of administration – Bob Wallace; Director of player personnel – John Becker; Head coaches: Head coach – Dick Vermeil; Associate head coach / wide receivers – Al Saunders; Assistant head coach / offensive line – John Matsko; Offensive coaches: Offensive coordinator – Mike Martz; Quarterbacks – John Ramsdell; Running backs – Wilbert Montgomery; Tight ends – Lynn Stiles; Offensive line – Jim Hanifan; Offensive assistant – Mike White	Defensive coaches: Defensive coordinator – Peter Giunta; Defensive coordinator / linebackers – John Bunting; Defensive line – Carl Hairston; Secondary – Steve Brown; Defensive assistant – Sam Clark; Defensive assistant – Todd Howard; Special teams coaches: Special teams – Frank Gansz; Strength and conditioning: Strength and conditioning – Chris Clausen; Strength and conditioning – Dana LeDuc

=== Final roster ===
1999 St. Louis Rams roster
Quarterbacks (QB): 9 Joe Germaine; 16 Paul Justin; 13 Kurt Warner; Running backs (RB): 28 Marshall Faulk; 42 James Hodgins FB; 25 Robert Holcombe FB; 31 Amp Lee; 36 Justin Watson; Wide receivers (WR): 80 Isaac Bruce; 81 Az-Zahir Hakim; 88 Torry Holt; 82 Tony Horne; 87 Ricky Proehl; 83 Chris Thomas; Tight ends (TE): 84 Ernie Conwell; 45 Jeff Robinson LS; 86 Roland Williams	Offensive linemen (OL): 60 Mike Gruttadauria C; 64 Andy McCollum C; 73 Fred Miller T; 61 Tom Nütten G; 76 Orlando Pace T; 71 Cameron Spikes G; 62 Adam Timmerman G; 50 Ryan Tucker T; 77 Matt Willig T; Defensive linemen (DL): 99 Ray Agnew DT; 92 Lionel Barnes DE; 93 Kevin Carter DE; 75 D'Marco Farr DT; 95 Nate Hobgood-Chittick DT; 96 Jay Williams DE; 98 Grant Wistrom DE; 90 Jeff Zgonina DT	Linebackers (LB): 56 Charlie Clemons MLB; 54 Todd Collins OLB; 59 London Fletcher MLB; 52 Mike Jones OLB; 57 Leonard Little OLB; 58 Mike Morton OLB; 91 Troy Pelshak OLB; 51 Lorenzo Styles MLB; Defensive backs (DB): 20 Taje Allen CB; 32 Dré Bly CB; 23 Devin Bush SS; 24 Ron Carpenter FS; 38 Rich Coady SS; 22 Billy Jenkins SS; 41 Todd Lyght CB; 35 Keith Lyle FS; 21 Dexter McCleon CB; Special teams (ST): 2 Mike Horan P; 14 Jeff Wilkins K	Practice squad: -- Darrius Blevins WR; 26 Clifton Crosby CB; 33 Derrick Harris RB; Reserve: 63 John Flannery G (IR); 10 Trent Green QB (IR); 94 Gaylon Hyder DT (IR); 70 Willie Jones T (NF-Inj.); 11 Rick Tuten P (IR); Rookies in italics 53 active, 5 reserve, 3 practice squad

== Preseason ==
=== Schedule ===
Week	Date	Opponent	Result	Record	Venue	Recap
1	August 7	Oakland Raiders	L 17–18	0–1	Trans World Dome	Recap
2	August 21	at Chicago Bears	L 24–38	0–2	Soldier Field	Recap
3	August 28	San Diego Chargers	W 24–21	1–2	Trans World Dome	Recap
4	September 2	at Detroit Lions	W 17–6	2–2	Pontiac Silverdome	Recap

== Regular season ==
=== Schedule ===
Week	Date	Opponent	Result	Record	Venue	Recap
1	September 12	Baltimore Ravens	**W** 27–10	1–0	Trans World Dome	Recap
2	Bye					
3	September 26	**Atlanta Falcons**	**W** 35–7	2–0	Trans World Dome	Recap
4	October 3	at Cincinnati Bengals	**W** 38–10	3–0	Cinergy Field	Recap
5	October 10	**San Francisco 49ers**	**W** 42–20	4–0	Trans World Dome	Recap
6	October 17	at **Atlanta Falcons**	**W** 41–13	5–0	Georgia Dome	Recap
7	October 24	Cleveland Browns	**W** 34–3	6–0	Trans World Dome	Recap
8	October 31	at Tennessee Titans	**L** 21–24	6–1	Adelphia Coliseum	Recap
9	November 7	at Detroit Lions	**L** 27–31	6–2	Pontiac Silverdome	Recap
10	November 14	**Carolina Panthers**	**W** 35–10	7–2	Trans World Dome	Recap
11	November 21	at **San Francisco 49ers**	**W** 23–7	8–2	3Com Park	Recap
12	November 28	**New Orleans Saints**	**W** 43–12	9–2	Trans World Dome	Recap
13	December 5	at **Carolina Panthers**	**W** 34–21	10–2	Ericsson Stadium	Recap
14	December 12	at **New Orleans Saints**	**W** 30–14	11–2	Louisiana Superdome	Recap
15	December 19	New York Giants	**W** 31–10	12–2	Trans World Dome	Recap
16	December 26	Chicago Bears	**W** 34–12	13–2	Trans World Dome	Recap
17	January 2	at Philadelphia Eagles	**L** 31–38	13–3	Veterans Stadium	Recap
Note: Intra-division opponents are in **bold** text.

=== Game summaries ===
==== Week 1: vs. Baltimore Ravens ====
Week 1: Baltimore Ravens at St. Louis Rams – Game summary

Quarter	1	2	3	4	Total
Ravens	0	3	7	0	**10**
**Rams**	3	14	0	10	**27**

at Trans World Dome, St. Louis, Missouri

- Date: September 12
- Game time: 12:00 p.m. CDT
- Game weather: indoors (dome)
- Game attendance: 62,100
- Referee: Tom White
- TV announcers (CBS): Gus Johnson and Brent Jones
- Recap, Game Book

Game information

**First quarter**

- STL – Jeff Wilkins 36-yard field goal, 8:56. Rams 3–0. **Drive: 6 plays, 22 yards, 3:38.**

**Second quarter**

- STL – Roland Williams 6-yard pass from Kurt Warner (Jeff Wilkins kick), 13:28. Rams 10–0. **Drive: 3 plays, 41 yards, 1:19.**
- BAL – Matt Stover 25-yard field goal, 6:00. Rams 10–3. **Drive: 4 plays, −1 yard, 1:22.**
- STL – Isaac Bruce 2-yard pass from Kurt Warner (Jeff Wilkins kick), 0:33. Rams 17–3. **Drive: 12 plays, 83 yards, 5:27.**

**Third quarter**

- BAL – Brandon Stokley 28-yard pass from Scott Mitchell (Matt Stover kick), 0:15. Rams 17–10. **Drive: 6 plays, 62 yards, 2:49.**

**Fourth quarter**

- STL – Jeff Wilkins 51-yard field goal, 8:56. Rams 20–10. **Drive: 6 plays, 23 yards, 1:21.**
- STL – Torry Holt 20-yard pass from Kurt Warner (Jeff Wilkins kick), 2:40. Rams 27–10. **Drive: 10 plays, 86 yards, 5:15.**

Top passers

- BAL – Scott Mitchell – 17/40, 188 yards, TD, 2 INT
- STL – Kurt Warner – 28/44, 309 yards, 3 TD, 2 INT

Top rushers

- BAL – Priest Holmes – 12 rushes, 52 yards
- STL – Marshall Faulk – 19 rushes, 54 yards

Top receivers

- BAL – Justin Armour – 4 receptions, 76 yards
- STL – Isaac Bruce – 8 receptions, 92 yards, TD

Quarterback Kurt Warner threw for 309 yards and three touchdowns in his first NFL start. The Rams pass defense notched five sacks and two interceptions against Ravens quarterback Scott Mitchell.

==== Week 3: vs. Atlanta Falcons ====
Week 3: Atlanta Falcons at St. Louis Rams – Game summary

Quarter	1	2	3	4	Total
Falcons	0	0	7	0	**7**
**Rams**	7	21	7	0	**35**

at Trans World Dome, St. Louis, Missouri

- Date: September 26
- Game time: 12:00 p.m. CDT
- Game weather: indoors (dome)
- Game attendance: 63,253
- Referee: Ron Blum
- TV announcers (Fox): Kenny Albert, Tim Green and Pete Peterson
- Recap, Game Book

Game information

**First quarter**

- STL – Robert Holcombe 1-yard run (Jeff Wilkins kick), 4:47. Rams 7–0. **Drive: 17 plays, 80 yards, 10:13.**

**Second quarter**

- STL – Torry Holt 38-yard pass from Kurt Warner (Jeff Wilkins kick), 14:53. Rams 14–0. **Drive: 8 plays, 78 yards, 3:06.**
- STL – Isaac Bruce 46-yard pass from Kurt Warner (Jeff Wilkins kick), 14:24. Rams 21–0. **Drive: 1 play, 46 yards, 0:07.**
- STL – Marshall Faulk 17-yard pass from Kurt Warner (Jeff Wilkins kick), 6:35. Rams 28–0. **Drive: 4 plays, 80 yards, 2:44.**

**Third quarter**

- ATL – Brian Kozlowski 1-yard pass from Tony Graziani (Morten Andersen kick), 7:32 Rams 28–7. **Drive: 12 plays, 73 yards, 7:28.**
- STL – Kurt Warner 5-yard run (Jeff Wilkins kick), 1:54. Rams 35–7. **Drive: 9 plays, 72 yards, 5:38.**

**Fourth quarter**

- No scoring plays

Top passers

- ATL – Tony Graziani – 14/22, 152 yards, TD
- STL – Kurt Warner – 17/25, 275 yards, 3 TD

Top rushers

- ATL – Byron Hanspard – 17 rushes, 50 yards
- STL – Marshall Faulk – 17 rushes, 105 yards

Top receivers

- ATL – Bob Christian – 5 receptions, 37 yards
- STL – Marshall Faulk – 5 receptions, 67 yards, TD

Kurt Warner was named NFC Offensive Player of the Week, completing 17 of 25 passes for 275 yards, three touchdown passes and also ran for another. Warner threw his first touchdown pass on the first play of the second quarter, hooking up with Torry Holt on a 38-yard strike. After an interception by safety Todd Lyght, Warner hit Isaac Bruce with a 46-yard touchdown. Bruce caught three passes for 68 yards. Marshall Faulk broke off with a 58-yard run down to the Falcons' 22-yard line. Three plays later, Warner's 17-yard scoring pass to Faulk gave the Rams a 28–0 lead. Faulk had his first 100-yard game for the Rams with 172 yards from scrimmage. After the Falcons got their only points midway through the third quarter. Warner broke loose for a 5-yard touchdown run as the Rams have their first win against Atlanta since 1996.

==== Week 4: at Cincinnati Bengals ====
Week 4: St. Louis Rams at Cincinnati Bengals – Game summary

Quarter	1	2	3	4	Total
**Rams**	7	14	14	3	**38**
Bengals	3	0	0	7	**10**

at Cinergy Field, Cincinnati, Ohio

- Date: October 3
- Game time: 1:00 p.m. EDT/12:00 p.m. CDT
- Game weather: 62 °F (16.7 °C) relative humidity 57%, no wind
- Game attendance: 45,481
- Referee: Phil Luckett
- TV announcers (Fox): Curt Menefee, Brian Baldinger and Pete Peterson
- Recap, Game Book

Game information

**First quarter**

- CIN – Doug Pelfrey 26-yard field goal, 8:05. Bengals 3–0. **Drive: 13 plays, 50 yards, 5:49.**
- STL – Az-Zahir Hakim 9-yard pass from Kurt Warner (Jeff Wilkins kick), 5:35. Rams 7–3. **Drive: 6 plays, 76 yards, 2:30.**

**Second quarter**

- STL – Robert Holcombe 1-yard run (Jeff Wilkins kick), 11:38. Rams 14–3. **Drive: 9 plays, 91 yards, 4:59.**
- STL – Az-Zahir Hakim 51-yard pass from Kurt Warner (Jeff Wilkins kick), 3:05. Rams 21–3. **Drive: 3 plays, 61 yards, 1:21.**

**Third quarter**

- STL – Az-Zahir Hakim 84-yard punt return (Jeff Wilkins kick), 12:59. Rams 28–3.
- STL – Az-Zahir Hakim 18-yard pass from Kurt Warner (Jeff Wilkins kick), 2:32. Rams 35–3. **Drive: 5 plays, 62 yards, 3:16.**

**Fourth quarter**

- STL – Jeff Wilkins 19-yard field goal, 10:42. Rams 38–3. **Drive: 8 plays, 41 yards, 5:14.**
- CIN – Akili Smith 1-yard run (Doug Pelfrey kick), 2:26. Rams 38–10. **Drive: 13 plays, 80 yards, 4:51.**

Top passers

- STL – Kurt Warner – 17/21, 310 yards, 3 TD
- CIN – Jeff Blake – 12/23, 114 yards

Top rushers

- STL – Marshall Faulk – 11 rushes, 23 yards
- CIN – Corey Dillon – 15 rushes, 39 yards

Top receivers

- STL – Isaac Bruce – 6 receptions, 152 yards
- CIN – Darnay Scott – 6 receptions, 61 yards

With this win the Rams moved to 3–0 in Kurt Warner's first three games as starting quarterback

==== Week 5: vs. San Francisco 49ers ====
Week 5: San Francisco 49ers at St. Louis Rams – Game summary

Quarter	1	2	3	4	Total
49ers	3	14	3	0	**20**
**Rams**	21	7	7	7	**42**

at Trans World Dome, St. Louis, Missouri

- Date: October 10
- Game time: 12:00 p.m. CDT
- Game weather: indoors (dome)
- Game attendance: 65,872
- Referee: Bill Carollo
- TV announcers (Fox): Ray Bentley, Ron Pitts and Pete Peterson
- Recap, Game Book

Game information

**First quarter**

- STL – Isaac Bruce 13-yard pass from Kurt Warner (Jeff Wilkins kick), 7:42. Rams 7–0. **Drive: 7 plays, 83 yards, 3:56.**
- STL – Isaac Bruce 5-yard pass from Kurt Warner (Jeff Wilkins kick), 4:26. Rams 14–0. **Drive: 4 plays, 64 yards, 1:37.**
- SF – Wade Richey 42-yard field goal, 1:34. Rams 14–3. **Drive: 6 plays, 38 yards, 2:52.**
- STL – Isaac Bruce 45-yard pass from Kurt Warner (Jeff Wilkins kick), 1:12. Rams 21–3. **Drive: 1 play, 45 yards, 0:22.**

**Second quarter**

- SF – Lawrence Phillips 2-yard run (Wade Richey kick), 12:24. Rams 21–10. **Drive: 9 plays, 80 yards, 3:48.**
- STL – Jeff Robinson 22-yard pass from Kurt Warner (Jeff Wilkins kick), 4:09. Rams 28–10. **Drive: 9 plays, 89 yards, 5:49.**
- SF – Junior Bryant defensive fumble recovery in end zone (Wade Richey kick), 1:59. Rams 28–17.

**Third quarter**

- SF – Wade Richey 43-yard field goal, 1:42. Rams 28–20. **Drive: 11 plays, 67 yards, 5:41.**
- STL – Tony Horne 97-yard kickoff return (Jeff Wilkins kick), 1:25. Rams 35–20. **Drive: 0 plays, 0 yards, 0:17.**

**Fourth quarter**

- STL – Isaac Bruce 42-yard pass from Kurt Warner (Jeff Wilkins kick), 11:11. Rams 42–20. **Drive: 4 plays, 55 yards, 2:07.**

Top passers

- SF – Jeff Garcia – 22/36, 233 yards, 3 INT
- STL – Kurt Warner – 20/23, 323 yards, 5 TD, INT

Top rushers

- SF – Charlie Garner – 13 rushes, 52 yards
- STL – Justin Watson – 11 rushes, 46 yards

Top receivers

- SF – Terrell Owens – 6 receptions, 60 yards
- STL – Isaac Bruce – 5 receptions, 134 yards, 4 TD

External videos
- 1999 49ers at Rams - Game highlights
- 1999 49ers at Rams - NFL Primetime highlights

The Rams got off to a strong start with Kurt Warner throwing touchdown passes to Isaac Bruce on each of the team's first three possessions. Isaac Bruce totaled 134 receiving yards and four touchdowns during the game. This game ended the Rams’ 17-game losing streak against the 49ers that began in 1990. It was also the Rams' first home win against the 49ers since 1986, when they were located in Los Angeles.

==== Week 6: at Atlanta Falcons ====
Week 6: St. Louis Rams at Atlanta Falcons – Game summary

Quarter	1	2	3	4	Total
**Rams**	14	14	6	7	**41**
Falcons	0	10	0	3	**13**

at Georgia Dome, Atlanta, Georgia

- Date: October 17
- Game time: 1:00 p.m. EDT/12:00 p.m. CDT
- Game weather: indoors (dome)
- Game attendance: 51,973
- Referee: Ron Blum
- TV announcers (Fox): Curt Menefee, Brian Baldinger and Mike Goldberg
- Recap, Game Book

Game information

**First quarter**

- STL – Isaac Bruce 4-yard pass from Kurt Warner (Jeff Wilkins kick), 9:20. Rams 7–0. **Drive: 10 plays, 76 yards, 5:40.**
- STL – Marshall Faulk 6-yard run (Jeff Wilkins kick), 2:03. Rams 14–0. **Drive: 10 plays, 60 yards, 5:18.**

**Second quarter**

- ATL – Bob Christian 13-yard pass from Chris Chandler (Morten Andersen kick), 11:19. Rams 14–7. **Drive: 4 plays, 44 yards, 2:10.**
- STL – Tony Horne 101-yard kickoff return (Jeff Wilkins kick), 10:59. Rams 21–7. **Drive: 0 plays, 0 yards, 0:20.**
- STL – Grant Wistrom 91-yard interception return (Jeff Wilkins kick), 1:42. Rams 28–7.
- ATL – Morten Andersen 19-yard field goal, 0:32, Rams 28–10. **Drive: 7 plays, 86 yards, 1:10.**

**Third quarter**

- STL – Jeff Wilkins 22-yard field goal, 12:42. Rams 31–10. **Drive: 4 plays, 4 yards, 1:22.**
- STL – Jeff Wilkins 49-yard field goal, 7:26. Rams 34–10. **Drive: 6 plays, 19 yards, 2:53.**

**Fourth quarter**

- STL – Robert Holcombe 1-yard run (Jeff Wilkins kick), 10:26. Rams 41–10. **Drive: 7 plays, 82 yards, 3:45.**
- ATL – Morten Andersen 25-yard field goal, 4:25. Rams 41–13. **Drive: 9 plays, 73 yards, 6:01.**

Top passers

- STL – Kurt Warner – 13/20, 111 yards, TD
- ATL – Chris Chandler – 10/18, 168, TD, INT

Top rushers

- STL – Marshall Faulk – 18 rushes, 181 yards, TD
- ATL – Ken Oxendine – 9 rushes, 32 yards

Top receivers

- STL – Isaac Bruce – 6 receptions, 48 yards, TD
- ATL – Terance Mathis – 7 receptions, 45 yards

Faulk gained 181 rushing yards, and the Rams defense generated two interceptions and four sacks. The Rams moved to 5–0 with this win over the 1998 NFC champions.

==== Week 7: vs. Cleveland Browns ====
Week 7: Cleveland Browns at St. Louis Rams – Game summary

Quarter	1	2	3	4	Total
Browns	3	0	0	0	**3**
**Rams**	14	7	3	10	**34**

at Trans World Dome, St. Louis, Missouri

- Date: October 24
- Game time: 12:00 p.m. CDT
- Game weather: indoors (dome)
- Game attendance: 65,866
- Referee: Walt Coleman
- TV announcers (CBS): Gus Johnson, Brent Jones, Marcus Allen
- Recap, Game Book

Game information

**First quarter**

- STL – Roland Williams 1-yard pass from Kurt Warner (Jeff Wilkins kick), 8:34. Rams 7–0. **Drive: 11 plays, 75 yards, 6:26.**
- STL – Isaac Bruce 4-yard pass from Kurt Warner (Jeff Wilkins kick), 6:49. Rams 14–0. **Drive: 4 plays, 28 yards, 1:33.**
- CLE – Phil Dawson 47-yard field goal, 0:17. Rams 14–3. **Drive: 13 plays, 51 yards, 6:32.**

**Second quarter**

- STL – Roland Williams 1-yard pass from Kurt Warner (Jeff Wilkins kick), 10:59. Rams 21–3. **Drive: 8 plays, 69 yards, 4:18.**

**Third quarter**

- STL – Jeff Wilkins 28-yard field goal, 3:13. Rams 24–3. **Drive: 7 plays, 45 yards, 3:33.**

**Fourth quarter**

- STL – Marshall Faulk 33-yard run (Jeff Wilkins kick), 14:50. Rams 31–3. **Drive: 4 plays, 73 yards, 1:57.**
- STL – Jeff Wilkins 36-yard field goal, 4:06. Rams 34–3. **Drive: 11 plays, 60 yards, 5:38.**

Top passers

- CLE – Tim Couch – 22/40, 185 yards, 2 INT
- STL – Kurt Warner – 23/29, 203 yards, 3 TD

Top rushers

- CLE – Karim Abdul-Jabbar – 6 rushes, 27 yards
- STL – Marshall Faulk – 16 rushes, 133 yards, TD

Top receivers

- CLE – Leslie Shepherd – 6 receptions, 85 yards
- STL – Marshall Faulk – 9 receptions, 67 yards

Marshall Faulk ran for 133 yards, and the Rams defense racked up three turnovers. The Rams ran their record to 6–0 against the revived Cleveland franchise.

==== Week 8: at Tennessee Titans ====
Week 8: St. Louis Rams at Tennessee Titans – Game summary

Quarter	1	2	3	4	Total
Rams	0	0	14	7	**21**
**Titans**	21	0	3	0	**24**

at Adelphia Coliseum, Nashville, Tennessee

- Date: October 31
- Game time: 12:00 p.m. CST
- Game weather: Sunny, 76 °F (24.4 °C)
- Game attendance: 66,415
- Referee: Bob McElwee
- TV announcers (Fox): Dick Stockton, Matt Millen and Pam Oliver
- Recap, Game Book

Game information

**First quarter**

- TEN – Lorenzo Neal 1-yard pass from Steve McNair (Al Del Greco kick), 8:28. Titans 7–0. **Drive: 11 plays, 80 yards, 6:32.**
- TEN – Eddie George 17-yard pass from Steve McNair (Al Del Greco kick), 2:41. Titans 14–0. **Drive: 1 play, 17 yards, 0:08.**
- TEN – Steve McNair 10-yard run (Al Del Greco kick), 1:24. Titans 21–0. **Drive: 2 plays, 26 yards, 0:24.**

**Second quarter**

- No scoring plays

**Third quarter**

- STL – Marshall Faulk 57-yard pass from Kurt Warner (Jeff Wilkins kick), 14:33. Titans 21–7. **Drive: 2 plays, 57 yards, 0:27.**
- STL – Isaac Bruce 3-yard pass from Kurt Warner (Jeff Wilkins kick), 7:55. Titans 21–14. **Drive: 6 plays, 59 yards, 2:30.**
- TEN – Al Del Greco 27-yard field goal, 4:18. Titans 24–14. **Drive: 9 plays, 65 yards, 3:37.**

**Fourth quarter**

- STL – Amp Lee 15-yard pass from Kurt Warner (Jeff Wilkins kick), 2:14. Titans 24–21. **Drive: 11 plays, 80 yards, 5:01.**

Top passers

- STL – Kurt Warner – 29/46, 328 yards, 3 TD
- TEN – Steve McNair – 13/29, 186 yards, 2 TD

Top rushers

- STL – Marshall Faulk – 16 rushes, 90 yards
- TEN – Eddie George – 17 rushes, 68 yards

Top receivers

- STL – Marshall Faulk – 6 receptions, 94 yards, TD
- TEN – Jackie Harris – 3 receptions, 44 yards

Despite a second half comeback, 21 unanswered first half points by Titans, due in part to two first-quarter fumbles by Kurt Warner in the Rams’ own half that Tennessee converted into touchdowns, enables them to inflict the Rams’ first defeat in a Super Bowl preview. Rams right offensive tackle Fred Miller had a miserable game, committing five false starts and two holding penalties.

==== Week 9: at Detroit Lions ====
Week 9: St. Louis Rams at Detroit Lions – Game summary

Quarter	1	2	3	4	Total
Rams	2	10	0	15	**27**
**Lions**	0	10	11	10	**31**

at Pontiac Silverdome, Pontiac, Michigan

- Date: November 7
- Game time: 1:00 p.m. EST/12:00 p.m. CST
- Game weather: indoors (dome)
- Game attendance: 73,224
- Referee: Johnny Grier
- TV announcers (Fox): Dick Stockton, Matt Millen and Pam Oliver
- Recap, Game Book

Game information

**First quarter**

- STL – Greg Hill tackled in end zone by London Fletcher for a safety, 6:58. Rams 2–0.

**Second quarter**

- DET – Germane Crowell 4-yard pass from Charlie Batch (Jason Hanson kick), 14:19. Lions 7–2. **Drive: 10 plays, 83 yards, 4:11.**
- STL – Jeff Robinson 6-yard pass from Kurt Warner (Jeff Wilkins kick), 11:32. Rams 9–7. **Drive: 6 plays, 81 yards, 2:47.**
- DET – Jason Hanson 29-yard field goal, 6:51. Lions 10–9. **Drive: 9 plays, 54 yards, 4:41.**
- STL – Jeff Wilkins 34-yard field goal, 0:41. Rams 12–10. **Drive: 11 plays, 47 yards, 3:19.**

**Third quarter**

- DET – Cory Schlesinger 3-yard pass from Gus Ferotte (Germane Crowell–Gus Ferotte pass), 9:20. Lions 18–12. **Drive: 4 plays, 12 yards, 1:59.**
- DET – Jason Hanson 43-yard field goal, 4:49. Lions 21–12. **Drive: 5 plays, 32 yards, 2:16.**

**Fourth quarter**

- STL – Az-Zahir Hakim 75-yard pass from Kurt Warner (Jeff Wilkins kick), 10:06. Lions 21–19. **Drive: 3 plays, 75 yards, 1:58.**
- DET – Jason Hanson 44-yard field goal, 6:10. Lions 24–19. **Drive: 7 plays, 35 yards, 3:56.**
- STL – Ryan Tucker 2-yard pass from Kurt Warner (Kurt Warner–Isaac Bruce pass), 2:42. Rams 27–24. **Drive: 8 plays, 87 yards, 3:28.**
- DET – Johnnie Morton 12-yard pass from Gus Ferotte (Jason Hanson kick), 0:28. Lions 31–27. **Drive: 8 plays, 77 yards, 2:14.**

Top passers

- STL – Kurt Warner – 25/42, 305 yards, 3 TD, 2 INT
- DET – Gus Ferotte – 12/16, 209 yards, 2 TD

Top rushers

- STL – Marshall Faulk – 11 rushes, 15 yards
- DET – Greg Hill – 11 ruses, 3 yards

Top receivers

- STL – Marshall Faulk – 10 receptions, 78 yards
- DET – Germane Crowell – 8 receptions, 163 yards, TD

Hoping to rebound from the loss to Tennessee, the Rams rallied from a nine point second-half deficit in Detroit to take a 27–24 lead over the Lions with 2:42 remaining in regulation. However, Gus Frerotte would lead the Lions down the field to reclaim the lead, converting a 4th-and-26 with a 57-yard pass to Germane Crowell along the way. Detroit then took a 31–27 lead on a Johnnie Morton touchdown reception with 28 seconds remaining. The Rams failed to respond, as Ron Rice would intercept Kurt Warner on the final drive, sealing St. Louis's second straight loss.

==== Week 10: vs. Carolina Panthers ====
Week 10: Carolina Panthers at St. Louis Rams – Game summary

Quarter	1	2	3	4	Total
Panthers	7	3	0	0	**10**
**Rams**	14	7	7	7	**35**

at Trans World Dome, St. Louis, Missouri

- Date: November 14
- Game time: 12:00 p.m. CST
- Game weather: indoors (dome)
- Game attendance: 65,965
- Referee: Phil Luckett
- TV announcers (Fox): Ray Bentley, Ron Pitts and Pete Peterson
- Recap, Game Book

Game information

**First quarter**

- CAR – Wesley Walls 14-yard pass from Steve Beuerlein (John Kasay kick), 9:38. Panthers 7–0. **Drive: 9 plays, 70 yards, 5:22.**
- STL – Isaac Bruce 22-yard pass from Kurt Warner (Jeff Wilkins kick), 7:02. Tied 7–7. **Drive: 4 plays, 80 yards, 2:36.**
- STL – Todd Lyght 57-yard interception return (Jeff Wilkins kick), 0:15. Rams 14–7.

**Second quarter**

- STL – Roland Williams 19-yard pass from Kurt Warner (Jeff Wilkins kick), 5:31. Rams 21–7. **Drive: 14 plays, 80 yards, 8:16.**
- CAR – John Kasay 24-yard field goal, 0:44. Rams 21–10. **Drive: 7 plays, 37 yards, 2:33.**

**Third quarter**

- STL – Mike Jones 37-yard defensive fumble return (Jeff Wilkins kick), 11:25. Rams 28–10.

**Fourth quarter**

- STL – Marshall Faulk 18-yard run (Jeff Wilkins kick), 1:11. Rams 35–10. **Drive: 8 plays, 78 yards, 3:18.**

Top passers

- CAR – Steve Beuerlein – 24/39, 286 yards, TD, 2 INT
- STL – Kurt Warner – 19/29, 284 yards, 2 TD, INT

Top rushers

- CAR – Fred Lane – 13 rushes, 54 yards
- STL – Marshall Faulk – 16 rushes, 73 yards, TD

Top receivers

- CAR – Muhsin Muhammad – 9 receptions, 125 yards
- STL – Isaac Bruce – 5 receptions, 69 yards, TD

==== Week 11: at San Francisco 49ers ====
Week 11: St. Louis Rams at San Francisco 49ers – Game summary

Quarter	1	2	3	4	Total
**Rams**	3	10	10	0	**23**
49ers	0	7	0	0	**7**

at 3Com Park, San Francisco, California

- Date: November 21
- Game time: 3:15 p.m. CST/1:15 p.m. PST
- Game weather: Sunny and brezzy, 55 °F (12.8 °C)
- Game attendance: 68,193
- Referee: Tony Corrente
- TV announcers (Fox): Pat Summerall, John Madden and D. J. Johnson
- Recap, Game Book

Game information

**First quarter**

- STL – Jeff Wilkins 40-yard field goal, 4:47. Rams 3–0. **Drive: 7 plays, 41 yards, 3:29.**

**Second quarter**

- SF – Fred Beasley 1-yard run (Wade Richey kick), 8:13. 49ers 7–3. **Drive: 9 plays, 80 yards, 4:51.**
- STL – Isaac Bruce 5-yard pass from Kurt Warner (Jeff Wilkins kick), 3:02. Rams 10–7. **Drive: 10 plays, 71 yards, 5:11.**
- STL – Jeff Wilkins 20-yard field goal, 0:00. Rams 13–7. **Drive: 15 plays, 78 yards, 1:41.**

**Third quarter**

- STL – Mike Jones 44-yard interception return (Jeff Wilkins kick), 9:41. Rams 20–7.
- STL – Jeff Wilkins 49-yard field goal, 2:23. Rams 23–7. **Drive: 10 plays, 28 yards, 4:50.**

**Fourth quarter**

- No scoring plays

Top passers

- STL – Kurt Warner – 22/40, 201 yards, TD, INT
- SF – Steve Stenstrom – 7/12, 108 yards, INT

Top rushers

- STL – Marshall Faulk – 21 rushes, 126 yards
- SF – Charlie Garner – 16 rushes, 77 yards

Top receivers

- STL – Isaac Bruce – 11 receptions, 93 yards, TD
- SF – Terrell Owens – 6 receptions, 120 yards

With this win the Rams swept the 49ers for the first time since the 1980 season nineteen years previously.

==== Week 12: vs. New Orleans Saints ====
Week 12: New Orleans Saints at St. Louis Rams – Game summary

Quarter	1	2	3	4	Total
Saints	3	9	0	0	**12**
**Rams**	7	8	7	21	**43**

at Trans World Dome, St. Louis, Missouri

- Date: November 28
- Game time: 12:00 p.m. CST
- Game weather: indoors (dome)
- Game attendance: 65,864
- Referee: Bill Carollo
- TV announcers (Fox): Sam Rosen, Bill Maas and Pete Peterson
- Recap, Game Book

Game information

**First quarter**

- STL – Torry Holt 25-yard pass from Kurt Warner (Jeff Wilkins kick), 13:58. Rams 7–0. **Drive: 3 plays, 30 yards, 1:02.**
- NO – Doug Brien 51-yard field goal, 6:37. Rams 7–3. **Drive: 9 plays, 26 yards, 3:39.**

**Second quarter**

- NO – Doug Brien 42-yard field goal, 14:56. Rams 7–6. **Drive: 9 plays, 45 yards, 5:03.**
- NO – Doug Brien 45-yard field goal, 9:08. Saints 9–7. **Drive: 8 plays, 53 yards, 4:09.**
- STL – Marshall Faulk 1-yard run (Marshall Faulk run), 7:15. Rams 15–9. **Drive: 5 plays, 49 yards, 1:53.**
- NO – Doug Brien 35-yard field goal, 0:07. Rams 15–12. **Drive: 9 plays, 63 yards, 2:10.**

**Third quarter**

- STL – Marshall Faulk 6-yard run (Jeff Wilkins kick), 3:08. Rams 22–12. **Drive: 7 plays, 80 yards, 4:11.**

**Fourth quarter**

- STL – Robert Holcombe 3-yard run (Jeff Wilkins kick), 12:15. Rams 29–12. **Drive: 7 plays, 67 yards, 3:28.**
- STL – Torry Holt 20-yard pass from Kurt Warner (Jeff Wilkins kick), 6:36. Rams 36–12. **Drive: 7 plays, 76 yards, 3:32.**
- STL – James Hodgins 1-yard run (Jeff Wilkins kick), 1:14. Rams 43–12. **Drive: 8 plays, 28 yards, 3:58.**

Top passers

- NO – Billy Joe Hobert – 23/41, 254 yards, 2 INT
- STL – Kurt Warner – 15/27, 213 yards, 2 TD

Top rushers

- NO – Lamar Smith – 18 rushes, 54 yards
- STL – Marshall Faulk – 18 rushes, 102 yards, 2 TD

Top receivers

- NO – Andre Hastings – 9 receptions, 113 yards
- STL – Torry Holt – 5 receptions, 87 yards, 2 TD

==== Week 13: at Carolina Panthers ====
Week 13: St. Louis Rams at Carolina Panthers – Game summary

Quarter	1	2	3	4	Total
**Rams**	14	7	0	13	**34**
Panthers	0	7	7	7	**21**

at Ericsson Stadium, Charlotte

- Date: December 5
- Game time: 1:00 p.m. EST/12:00 p.m. CST
- Game weather: Cloudy, 72 °F (22.2 °C)
- Game attendance: 62,285
- Referee: Larry Nemmers
- TV announcers (Fox): Ray Bentley, Ron Pitts and Rich Brenner
- Recap, Game Book

Game information

**First quarter**

- STL – Roland Williams 14-yard pass from Kurt Warner (Jeff Wilkins kick), 10:12. Rams 7–0. **Drive: 9 plays, 69 yards, 4:48.**
- STL – Az-Zahir Hakim 48-yard pass from Kurt Warner (Jeff Wilkins kick), 5:41. Rams 14–0. **Drive: 4 plays, 87 yards, 1:55.**

**Second quarter**

- STL – Az-Zahir Hakim 49-yard pass from Kurt Warner (Jeff Wilkins kick), 4:27. Rams 21–0. **Drive: 5 plays, 65 yards, 2:03.**
- CAR – Wesley Walls 15-yard pass from Steve Beuerlein (John Kasay kick), 0:41. Rams 21–7. **Drive: 15 plays, 70 yards, 3:46.**

**Third quarter**

- CAR – Donald Hayes 36-yard pass from Steve Beuerlein (John Kasay kick), 5:13. Rams 21–14. **Drive: 5 plays, 49 yards, 1:39.**

**Fourth quarter**

- STL – Jeff Wilkins 44-yard field goal, 14:50. Rams 24–14. **Drive: 10 plays, 54 yards, 5:23.**
- CAR – Patrick Jeffers 71-yard pass from Steve Beuerlein (John Kasay kick), 14:31. Rams 24–21. **Drive: 1 play, 71 yards, 0:19.**
- STL – Dre Bly 53-yard interception return (Jeff Wilkins kick), 9:48. Rams 31–21.
- STL – Jeff Wilkins 29-yard field goal, 3:39. Rams 34–21. **Drive: 10 plays, 53 yards, 4:17.**

Top passers

- STL – Kurt Warner – 22/31, 351 yards, 3 TD, 2 INT
- CAR – Steve Beuerlein – 21/42, 266 yards, 3 TD, 2 INT

Top rushers

- STL – Marshall Faulk – 22 rushes, 118 yards
- CAR – Tim Biakabutuka – 11 rushes, 42 yards

Top receivers

- STL – Az-Zahir Hakim – 4 receptions, 122 yards, 2 TD
- CAR – Patrick Jeffers – 7 receptions, 107 yards, TD

With the win, the Rams cinched both their first playoff berth since 1989 and the NFC West for the first time since 1985.

==== Week 14: at New Orleans Saints ====
Week 14: St. Louis Rams at New Orleans Saints – Game summary

Quarter	1	2	3	4	Total
**Rams**	7	17	3	3	**30**
Saints	6	8	0	0	**14**

at Louisiana Superdome, New Orleans, Louisiana

- Date: December 12
- Game time: 12:00 p.m. CST
- Game weather: indoors (dome)
- Game attendance: 46,838
- Referee: Bob McElwee
- TV announcers (Fox): Thom Brennaman, Jeff Lageman and Jim Gallagher
- Recap, Game Book

Game information

**First quarter**

- NO – Doug Brien 29-yard field goal, 10:41, Saints 3–0. **Drive: 8 plays, 62 yards, 4:19.**
- STL – Robert Holcombe 1-yard pass from Kurt Warner (Jeff Wilkins kick), 5:39. Rams 7–3. **Drive: 9 plays, 59 yards, 5:02.**
- NO – Doug Brien 26-yard field goal, 1:29, Rams 7–6. **Drive: 9 plays, 54 yards, 4:10.**

**Second quarter**

- NO – Cam Cleeland 2-yard pass from Billy Joe Hobert (Billy Joe Hobert–Eddie Kennison pass), 9:09. Saints 14–7. **Drive: 6 plays, 31 yards, 3:46.**
- STL – Jeff Wilkins 40-yard field goal, 7:24. Saints 14–10. **Drive: 5 plays, 38 yards, 1:45.**
- STL – Marshall Faulk 4-yard run (Jeff Wilkins kick), 3:28. Rams 17–14. **Drive: 6 plays, 59 yards, 2:55.**
- STL – Marshall Faulk 30-yard pass from Kurt Warner (Jeff Wilkins kick), 0:51. Rams 24–14. **Drive: 5 plays, 47 yards, 1:06.**

**Third quarter**

- STL – Jeff Wilkins 30-yard field goal, 5:40. Rams 27–14. **Drive: 7 plays, 53 yards, 2:42.**

**Fourth quarter**

- STL – Jeff Wilkins 38-yard field goal, 2:29. Rams 30–14. **Drive: 12 plays, 74 yards, 7:22.**

Top passers

- STL – Kurt Warner – 21/31, 346 yards, 2 TD, INT
- NO – Billy Joe Hobert – 12/28, 188 yards, TD, 3 INT

Top rushers

- STL – Marshall Faulk – 29 rushes, 154 yards, TD
- NO – Wilmont Perry – 14 rushes, 54 yards

Top receivers

- STL – Torry Holt – 6 receptions, 113 yards
- NO – Keith Poole – 3 receptions, 83 yards

The Rams pass defense pressured the Saints offense, racking up three interceptions and six sacks. The Rams clinched a first-round bye for the first time under the playoff format adopted in 1990.

==== Week 15: vs. New York Giants ====
Week 15: New York Giants at St. Louis Rams – Game summary

Quarter	1	2	3	4	Total
Giants	0	0	3	7	**10**
**Rams**	3	7	7	14	**31**

at Trans World Dome, St. Louis, Missouri

- Date: December 19
- Game time: 12:00 p.m. CST
- Game weather: indoors (dome)
- Game attendance: 66,065
- Referee: Gerry Austin
- TV announcers (Fox): Dick Stockton, Matt Millen and Pam Oliver
- Recap, Game Book

Game information

**First quarter**

- STL – Jeff Wilkins 47-yard field goal, 3:24. Rams 3–0. **Drive: 11 plays, 66 yards, 5:41.**

**Second quarter**

- STL – Az-Zahir Hakim 3-yard pass from Kurt Warner (Jeff Wilkins kick), 13:31. Rams 10–0. **Drive: 7 plays, 59 yards, 3:10.**

**Third quarter**

- NYG – Cary Blanchard 23-yard field goal, 10:08. Rams 10–3. **Drive: 11 plays, 69 yards, 4:52.**
- STL – Devin Bush 45-yard interception return (Jeff Wilkins kick), 5:25. Rams 17–3.

**Fourth quarter**

- STL – Az-Zahir Hakim 65-yard pass from Kurt Warner (Jeff Wilkins kick), 13:58. Rams 24–3. **Drive: 2 plays, 67 yards, 0:52.**
- STL – Mike Jones 22-yard interception return (Jeff Wilkins kick), 7:10. Rams 31–3.
- NYG – Ike Hilliard 7-yard pass from Kerry Collins (Cary Blanchard kick), 4:48. Rams 31–10. **Drive: 8 plays, 80 yards, 2:22.**

Top passers

- NYG – Kerry Collins – 21/37, 273 yards, TD, 2 INT
- STL – Kurt Warner – 18/32, 319 yards, 2 TD

Top rushers

- NYG – Joe Montgomery – 12 rushes, 41 yards
- STL – Marshall Faulk – 16 rushes, 68 yards

Top receivers

- NYG – Amani Toomer – 9 receptions, 162 yards
- STL – Marshall Faulk – 6 receptions, 97 yards

With a 12–2 record with two games remaining, the Rams clinched home field advantage for the first time since 1978.

==== Week 16: vs. Chicago Bears ====
Week 16: Chicago Bears at St. Louis Rams – Game summary

Quarter	1	2	3	4	Total
Bears	0	0	6	6	**12**
**Rams**	0	17	14	3	**34**

at Trans World Dome, St. Louis, Missouri

- Date: December 26
- Game time: 12:00 p.m. CST
- Game weather: indoors (dome)
- Game attendance: 65,941
- Referee: Tom White
- TV announcers (Fox): Kenny Albert, Tim Green and Pete Peterson
- Recap, Game Book

Game information

**First quarter**

- No scoring plays

**Second quarter**

- STL – Marshall Faulk 48-yard pass from Kurt Warner (Jeff Wilkins kick), 8:36. Rams 7–0. **Drive: 5 plays, 82 yards, 3:10.**
- STL – Roland Williams 2-yard pass from Kurt Warner (Jeff Wilkins kick), 2:11. Rams 14–0. **Drive: 7 plays, 83 yards, 4:07.**
- STL – Jeff Wilkins 38-yard field goal, 0:44. Rams 17–0. **Drive: 8 plays, 44 yards, 0:50.**

**Third quarter**

- STL – Isaac Bruce 4-yard pass from Kurt Warner (Jeff Wilkins kick), 9:59. Rams 24–0. **Drive: 10 plays, 80 yards, 5:01.**
- STL – Grant Wistrom 40-yard interception return (Jeff Wilkins kick), 8:08. Rams 31–0.
- CHI – Bobby Engram 8-yard pass from Shane Matthews (kick failed, wide left), 3:00 Rams 31–6. **Drive: 11 plays, 71 yards, 5:08.**

**Fourth quarter**

- CHI – Bobby Engram 4-yard pass from Shane Matthews (pass failed), 11:18 Rams 31–12. **Drive: 8 plays, 61 yards, 3:29.**
- STL – Jeff Wilkins 28-yard field goal, 5:05. Rams 34–12. **Drive: 8 plays, 39 yards, 3:58.**

Top passers

- CHI – Shane Matthews – 23/39, 266 yards, 2 TD, INT
- STL – Kurt Warner – 24/35, 334 yards, 3 TD, INT

Top rushers

- CHI – James Allen – 6 rushes, 30 yards
- STL – Marshall Faulk – 10 rushes, 54 yards

Top receivers

- CHI – Bobby Engram – 13 receptions, 143 yards, 2 TD
- STL – Marshall Faulk – 12 receptions, 204 yards, TD

Marshall Faulk racked up 204 receiving yards, in addition to 54 rushing yards on 10 carries. With this victory, the Rams set single-season franchise records for most home wins with 8 and most overall wins with 13 (a record they would break two years later). Additionally, the Rams finished with a perfect home record for the first time since the 1973 season.

==== Week 17: at Philadelphia Eagles ====
Week 17: St. Louis Rams at Philadelphia Eagles – Game summary

Quarter	1	2	3	4	Total
Rams	7	10	7	7	**31**
**Eagles**	3	14	7	14	**38**

at Veterans Stadium, Philadelphia, Pennsylvania

- Date: January 2
- Game time: 1:00 p.m. EST/12:00 p.m. CST
- Game weather: Partly sunny & mild, 54 °F (12.2 °C)
- Game attendance: 60,700
- Referee: Mike Carey
- TV announcers (Fox): Kenny Albert and Tim Green
- Recap, Game Book

Game information

**First quarter**

- STL – Marshall Faulk 8-yard pass from Kurt Warner (Jeff Wilkins kick), 9:42. Rams 7–0. **Drive: 2 plays, 8 yards, 0:08.**
- PHI – David Akers 46-yard field goal, 7:27. Rams 7–3. **Drive: 4 plays, −2 yards, 2:15.**

**Second quarter**

- STL – Marshall Faulk 1-yard run (Jeff Wilkins kick), 11:57. Rams 14–3. **Drive: 8 plays, 86 yards, 4:25.**
- PHI – Torrance Small 63-yard pass from Donovan McNabb (David Akers kick), 10:14. Rams 14–10. **Drive: 3 plays, 74 yards, 1:43.**
- STL – Jeff Wilkins 47-yard field goal, 6:20. Rams 17–10. **Drive: 4 plays, 4 yards, 1:27.**
- PHI – Duce Staley 3-yard pass from Donovan McNabb (David Akers kick), 0:32. Tied 17–17. **Drive: 5 plays, 23 yards, 1:29.**

**Third quarter**

- PHI – Mike Mamula 41-yard interception return (Norm Johnson kick), 12:15. Eagles 24–17.
- STL – Torry Holt 15-yard pass from Kurt Warner (Jeff Wilkins kick), 9:22. Tied 24–24. **Drive: 6 plays, 67 yards, 2:53.**

**Fourth quarter**

- PHI – Chad Lewis 5-yard pass from Donovan McNabb (Norm Johnson kick), 10:55. Eagles 31–24. **Drive: 6 plays, 54 yards, 3:11.**
- PHI – Al Harris 17-yard interception return (Norm Johnson kick), 1:16. Eagles 38–24.
- STL – Torry Holt 63-yard pass from Joe Germaine (Jeff Wilkins kick), 0:59. Eagles 38–31. **Drive: 1 play, 63 yards, 0:17.**

Top passers

- STL – Kurt Warner – 12/24, 141 yards, 2 TD, 2 INT
- PHI – Donovan McNabb – 15/32, 179 yards, 3 TD, 2 INT

Top rushers

- STL – Robert Holcombe – 15 rushes, 86 yards
- PHI – Duce Staley – 18 rushes, 44 yards

Top receivers

- STL – Torry Holt – 5 receptions, 122 yards, 2 TD
- PHI – Torrance Small – 6 receptions, 98 yards, TD

The Rams traveled to Philadelphia for their season finale against the struggling Eagles. The Rams rested a number of starters for much of the game, having already clinched homefield playoffs. Despite dominating Philadelphia offensively, St. Louis was doomed by a seven-turnover afternoon, with three lost fumbles and four interceptions, two of which were returned for Eagles touchdowns. The Rams lost to the Eagles, 38–31, snapping their seven-game win streak. St. Louis nevertheless finished as the top seed in the NFC playoffs with a 13–3 record.

=== Standings ===
NFC West
	W	L	T	PCT	PF	PA	STK
^{(1)} St. Louis Rams	13	3	0	.813	526	242	L1
Carolina Panthers	8	8	0	.500	421	381	W1
Atlanta Falcons	5	11	0	.313	285	380	W2
San Francisco 49ers	4	12	0	.250	295	453	L3
New Orleans Saints	3	13	0	.188	260	434	L1

=== Kurt Warner ===
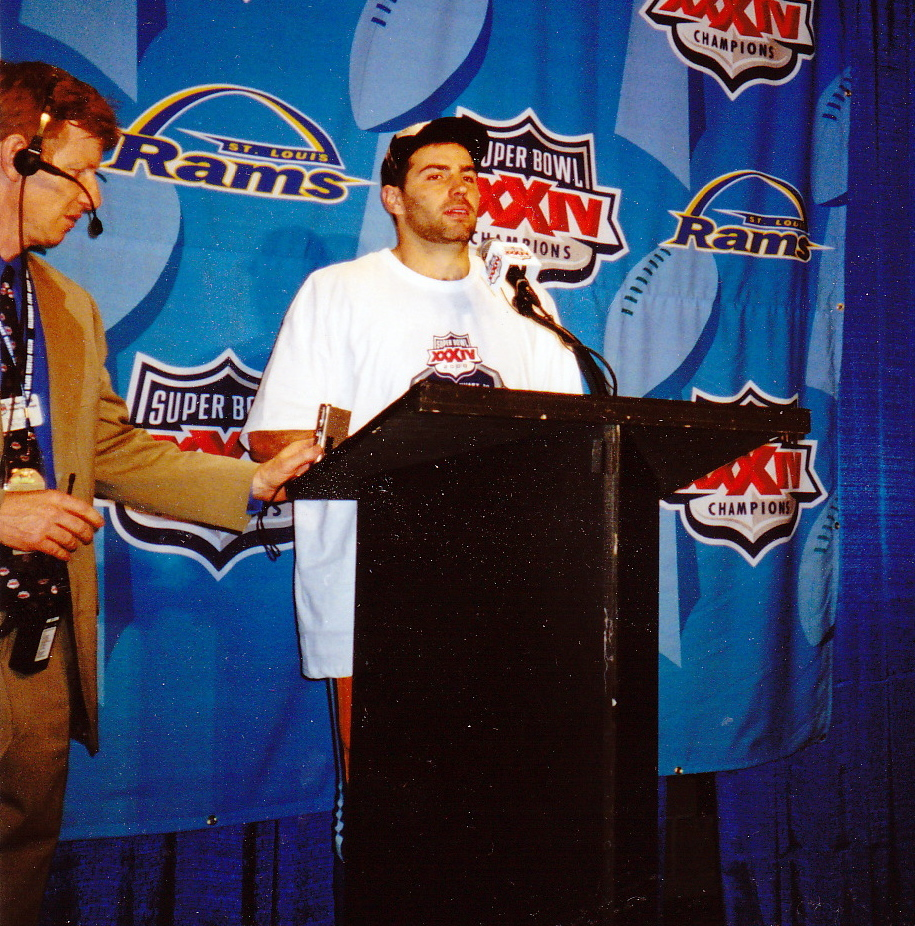
Kurt Warner at the Super Bowl XXXIV post-game press conference

Warner was the backup quarterback for the St. Louis Rams during the 1998 regular season and the 1999 preseason. When starting quarterback Trent Green was injured in a preseason game, Warner took over as the starter. With the support of running back Marshall Faulk and wide receivers Isaac Bruce, Torry Holt, Az-Zahir Hakim and Ricky Proehl, Warner completed one of the top seasons by a quarterback in NFL history by throwing for 4,353 yards with 41 touchdown passes and a completion rate of 65.1 percent. The Rams' high-powered offense was nicknamed "The Greatest Show on Turf" and registered the first in a string of three consecutive 500-point seasons, an NFL record. Warner threw three touchdown passes in each of the first three games in the 1999 season, his first three NFL starts. He is the only NFL quarterback in history to accomplish that feat, and only the second other than Dan Marino to do it in his first two NFL starts.

Warner really drew attention, however, in the season's fourth game against the San Francisco 49ers, who had been NFC West Division champs for 12 of the previous 13 seasons. The Rams had lost 17 of their previous 18 meetings with the 49ers and had a 3–0 record along with the 49ers’ 3–1 record. Warner threw three touchdown passes on the Rams' first three possessions of the game and four in the first half to propel the Rams to a 28–10 halftime lead on the way to a 42–20 victory. Warner finished the game with five touchdown passes, giving him 14 in four games and, more importantly, the Rams a 4–0 record. After many years of defeats and losing records, football experts finally had to take notice.

Warner's breakout season from a career in anonymity was so unexpected that Sports Illustrated featured him on their October 18 cover with the caption “Who IS this guy?” He was named the 1999 NFL MVP at the season's end.

In the NFL playoffs, Warner led the Rams to a Super Bowl XXXIV victory against the Tennessee Titans. He threw for two touchdowns and a then Super Bowl record 414 passing yards, including a 73-yard touchdown to Isaac Bruce when the game was tied with just over two minutes to play. Warner also set a Super Bowl record by attempting 45 passes without a single interception.

Warner was awarded the 1999 Super Bowl MVP, becoming one of only seven players to win both the league MVP and Super Bowl MVP awards in the same year. The others are Bart Starr in 1966, Terry Bradshaw in 1978, Joe Montana in 1989, Emmitt Smith in 1993, Steve Young in 1994, and Patrick Mahomes in 2023.

== Playoffs ==
Round	Date	Opponent (seed)	Result	Record	Venue	Recap
Wild Card	First-round bye					
NFC Divisional	January 16, 2000	Minnesota Vikings (4)	W 49–37	1–0	Trans World Dome	Recap
NFC Championship	January 23, 2000	Tampa Bay Buccaneers (2)	W 11–6	2–0	Trans World Dome	Recap
Super Bowl XXXIV	January 30, 2000	vs. Tennessee Titans (A4)	W 23–16	3–0	Georgia Dome	Recap

=== NFC Divisional Playoff ===
NFC Divisional Playoffs: (4) Minnesota Vikings at (1) St. Louis Rams – Game summary

Quarter	1	2	3	4	Total
Vikings	3	14	0	20	37
Rams	14	0	21	14	49

at Trans World Dome, St. Louis, Missouri

- Date: January 16, 2000
- Game time: 11:30 a.m. CST
- Game weather: Played indoors, domed stadium
- Game attendance: 66,194
- Referee: Walt Coleman
- TV announcers (Fox): Pat Summerall, John Madden, D. J. Johnson and Ron Pitts
- Recap, Game Book

Game information

First quarter

- MIN – Gary Anderson 31-yard field goal, 9:23. Vikings 3–0. Drive: 11 plays, 60 yards, 5:37.
- STL – Isaac Bruce 77-yard pass from Kurt Warner (Jeff Wilkins kick), 9:02. Rams 7–3. Drive: 1 play, 77 yards, 0:21.
- STL – Marshall Faulk 41-yard pass from Kurt Warner (Jeff Wilkins kick), 4:19. Rams 14–3. Drive: 4 plays, 82 yards, 1:55.

Second quarter

- MIN – Cris Carter 22-yard pass from Jeff George (Gary Anderson kick), 9:53. Rams 14–10. Drive: 8 plays, 96 yards, 3:42.
- MIN – Leroy Hoard 4-yard run (Gary Anderson kick), 2:40. Vikings 17–14. Drive: 7 plays, 53 yards, 3:43.

Third quarter

- STL – Tony Horne 95-yard kickoff return (Jeff Wilkins kick), 14:42. Rams 21–17. Drive: 0 plays, 0 yards, 0:18.
- STL – Marshall Faulk 1-yard run (Jeff Wilkins kick), 8:28. Rams 28–17. Drive: 9 plays, 51 yards, 4:59.
- STL – Jeff Robinson 13-yard pass from Kurt Warner (Jeff Wilkins kick), 0:22. Rams 35–17. Drive: 8 plays, 61 yards, 4:23.

Fourth quarter

- STL – Ryan Tucker 1-yard pass from Kurt Warner (Jeff Wilkins kick), 13:36. Rams 42–17. Drive: 4 plays, 23 yards, 1:33.
- STL – Roland Williams 2-yard pass from Kurt Warner (Jeff Wilkins kick), 8:13. Rams 49–17. Drive: 8 plays, 62 yards, 4:01.
- MIN – Jake Reed 4-yard pass from Jeff George (Leroy Hoard run), 4:56. Rams 49–25. Drive: 6 plays, 80 yards, 3:17.
- MIN – Randy Moss 44-yard pass from Jeff George (pass failed), 3:48. Rams 49–31. Drive: 5 plays, 63 yards, 1:08.
- MIN – Randy Moss 2-yard pass from Jeff George (pass failed), 0:31. Rams 49–37. Drive: 16 plays, 85 yards, 2:09.

Top passers

- MIN – Jeff George – 29/50, 423 yards, 4 TD, INT
- STL – Kurt Warner – 27/33, 391 yards, 5 TD, INT

Top rushers

- MIN – Robert Smith – 20 rushes, 64 yards
- STL – Marshall Faulk – 11 rushes, 21 yards, TD

Top receivers

- MIN – Randy Moss – 9 receptions, 188 yards, 2 TD
- STL – Isaac Bruce – 4 receptions, 133 yards, TD

As expected, this match between the two high powered offenses produced a lot of points (86), and yards (880, 475 by St. Louis, 405 by Minnesota). But after falling behind 17–14, St. Louis stormed to victory with 35 consecutive second half points to open a 49–17 lead early in the fourth quarter. Warner threw for 391 yards and five touchdown passes to five different receivers, and Bruce accounted for 133 receiving yards. It was also the first NFL Playoff game ever played in St. Louis.

=== NFC Championship Game ===
NFC Championship: (2) Tampa Bay Buccaneers at (1) St. Louis Rams – Game summary

Quarter	1	2	3	4	Total
Buccaneers	3	0	3	0	6
Rams	3	2	0	6	11

at Trans World Dome, St. Louis, Missouri

- Date: January 23, 2000
- Game time: 3:00 p.m. CST
- Game weather: Played indoors, domed stadium
- Game attendance: 66,396
- Referee: Bill Carollo
- TV announcers (Fox): Pat Summerall, John Madden, D. J. Johnson and Ron Pitts
- Recap, Game Book

Game information

First quarter

- TB – Martin Gramatica 25-yard field goal, 12:22. Buccaneers 3–0. Drive: 6 plays, 13 yards, 2:23.
- STL – Jeff Wilkins 24-yard field goal, 4:17. Tied 3–3. Drive: 16 plays, 74 yards, 8:05.

Second quarter

- STL – Tony Mayberry fumble out of bounds in the end zone for a safety, 14:55. Rams 5–3.

Third quarter

- TB – Martin Gramatica 23-yard field goal, 10:38. Buccaneers 6–5. Drive: 9 plays, 66 yards, 4:32.

Fourth quarter

- STL – Ricky Proehl 30-yard pass from Kurt Warner (pass failed), 4:44. Rams 11–6. Drive: 6 play, 47 yards, 3:17.

Top passers

- TB – Shaun King – 13/29, 163 yards, 2 INT
- STL – Kurt Warner – 26/43, 258 yards, TD, 3 INT

Top rushers

- TB – Mike Alstott – 12 rushes, 39 yards
- STL – Marshall Faulk – 17 rushes, 44 yards

Top receivers

- TB – Jacquez Green – 4 receptions, 59 yards
- STL – Ricky Proehl – 6 receptions, 100 yards, TD

The Rams and Buccaneers, a rematch of the 1979 NFC Championship Game, would slug it out for most of the game, with the Buccaneers defense holding the Rams highly-potent offense in check. Tampa Bay, weak on offense, could only muster 163 passing yards all game against the Rams defense, with the Rams defense notching two interceptions and five sacks. The Buccaneers would only muster two field goals, and gave up a costly safety in the second quarter when a bad snap from center Tony Mayberry went over the head of rookie quarterback Shaun King and out of the end zone. Despite this, the Buccaneers nursed an unusual 6–5 lead into the 4th Quarter. The Rams broke open a defense dominated game when Kurt Warner threw a touchdown pass to Ricky Proehl, his first and only touchdown catch of the season, with 4:44 left in the game.

The Buccaneers would mount a drive on their final possession, however a replay overturned what appeared to be a 2nd down reception by Buccaneers wide receiver Bert Emanuel which would have set up a 3rd down and 10. Emanuel dove for a catch and clasped the ball between two hands, then upon falling, the ball touched the turf while in Emanuel's hands. The ruling on the field was a completed catch, but was overturned on review because the ball had touched the ground before Emanuel was deemed in possession of it. Following this, the Buccaneers threw incomplete passes on 3rd and 4th down and the Rams were able to kneel out the clock.

This was the Rams’ first NFC Championship win since the 1979 season.

=== Super Bowl XXXIV ===
Super Bowl XXXIV: (N1) St. Louis Rams vs. (A4) Tennessee Titans – Game summary

Quarter	1	2	3	4	Total
Rams	3	6	7	7	23
Titans	0	0	6	10	16

at Georgia Dome, Atlanta, Georgia

- Date: January 30, 2000
- Game time: 6:25 p.m. EST/5:25 p.m. CST
- Game weather: Played indoors, domed stadium
- Game attendance: 72,625
- Referee: Bob McElwee
- TV announcers (ABC): Al Michaels, Boomer Esiason, Lesley Visser and Lynn Swann
- Recap, Game Book

Game information

First quarter

- STL – Jeff Wilkins 27-yard field goal, 3:00. Rams 3–0. Drive: 6 plays, 54 yards, 2:48.

Second quarter

- STL – Jeff Wilkins 29-yard field goal, 4:16. Rams 6–0. Drive: 11 plays, 73 yards, 5:13.
- STL – Jeff Wilkins 28-yard field goal, 0:15. Rams 9–0. Drive: 14 plays, 67 yards, 3:23.

Third quarter

- STL – Torry Holt 9-yard pass from Kurt Warner (Jeff Wilkins kick), 7:20. Rams 16–0. Drive: 8 plays, 68 yards, 3:59.
- TEN – Eddie George 1-yard run (pass failed), 0:15. Rams 16–6. Drive: 12 plays, 66 yards, 7:06.

Fourth quarter

- TEN – Eddie George 2-yard run (Al Del Greco kick), 7:21. Rams 16–13. Drive: 13 plays, 79 yards, 7:15.
- TEN – Al Del Greco 43-yard field goal, 2:12. Tied 16–16. Drive: 8 plays, 28 yards, 4:05.
- STL – Isaac Bruce 73-yard pass from Kurt Warner (Jeff Wilkins kick), 1:54. Rams 23–16. Drive: 1 play, 73 yards, 0:18.

Top passers

- STL – Kurt Warner – 24/45, 414 yards, 2 TD
- TEN – Steve McNair – 22/36, 214 yards

Top rushers

- STL – Marshall Faulk – 10 rushes, 17 yards
- TEN – Eddie George – 28 rushes, 95 yards, 2 TD

Top receivers

- STL – Isaac Bruce – 6 receptions, 162 yards, TD
- TEN – Jackie Harris – 7 receptions, 64 yards

The first half of Super Bowl XXXIV had been uncharacteristically low-scoring for St. Louis, as they scored only three Jeff Wilkins field goals in the first half. The Rams finally got into the end zone in the third quarter, with a 9-yard touchdown pass from Warner to Torry Holt, giving St. Louis a 16–0 lead. Tennessee, however, scored 16 unanswered points with two Eddie George touchdown runs (1- and 2-yards respectively, the first with a failed two-point conversion attempt), and a 43-yard Al Del Greco field goal.

On St. Louis’ first play from scrimmage after Tennessee's tying field goal, Warner threw a 73-yard touchdown to Isaac Bruce to take a 23–16 lead with just under two minutes left in the game, which would give Tennessee one more chance to tie the game with a touchdown.

The Titans took over the ball at their own 10-yard line with 1:54 left in the game after committing a holding penalty on the ensuing kickoff. McNair started out the drive with a pair of completions to Mason and Wycheck for gains of 9 and 7 yards to reach the 28-yard line. Then after throwing an incompletion, defensive back Dre' Bly’s 15-yard facemask penalty while tackling McNair on a 12-yard scramble gave the Titans a first down at the St. Louis 45-yard line. On the next play, St. Louis was penalized 5 yards for being offsides, moving the ball to the 40-yard line with 59 seconds left. McNair then ran for 2 yards, followed by a 7-yard completion to wide receiver Kevin Dyson. Three plays later, with the Titans facing 3rd down and 5 to go, McNair was hit by two Rams’ defenders, but he escaped and completed a 16-yard pass to Dyson to gain a first down at the Rams 10-yard line.

Tennessee then used up their final timeout with just 6 seconds left in the game, giving them a chance for one last play. McNair threw a short pass to Kevin Dyson down the middle, which looked certain to tie up the game until Rams linebacker Mike Jones tackled Dyson at the one-yard line as time expired. Dyson tried to stretch his arm and the football across the goal line, but he had already gone down, so it was too late. This final play has gone down in NFL history as simply “The Tackle”.

With the win, the Rams secured their first Super Bowl win in franchise history. However, this would be the Rams last appearance in the Super Bowl until 2001 & their only Super Bowl victory until 2021, marking this the first and only Super Bowl win for the Rams in St. Louis.

== Team statistics ==
- Led NFL in total yards (400.8 yards per game)
- Led NFL in passing yards (272.1 yards per game)
- Led NFL in scoring (32.9 points per game)
- Led NFL in rushing defense (74.3 yards per game)
- Led NFL (tied with JAX) in sacks (57)

== Player awards and records ==
- Kurt Warner, Bert Bell Award
- Kurt Warner, NFL MVP
- Kurt Warner, Super Bowl Most Valuable Player
- Dick Vermeil, Coach of the Year
- Marshall Faulk, Daniel F. Reeves Memorial Award (Rams MVP)
- Marshall Faulk, Offensive Player of the Year
- Torry Holt, Rams Rookie of the Year

League leaders
Passing	Kurt Warner (109.2 rating)
Passing touchdowns	Kurt Warner (41 TDs)
Kickoff returns	Tony Horne (29.7 average yards)
Sacks	Kevin Carter (17)
