= 1998 St. Louis Rams season =

NFL team season

- Owner: Georgia Frontiere
- General manager: Dick Vermeil
- Head coach: Dick Vermeil
- Home stadium: Trans World Dome

Results
- Record: 4–12
- Division place: 5th NFC West
- Playoffs: Did not qualify
- Pro Bowlers: DE Kevin Carter

Uniform
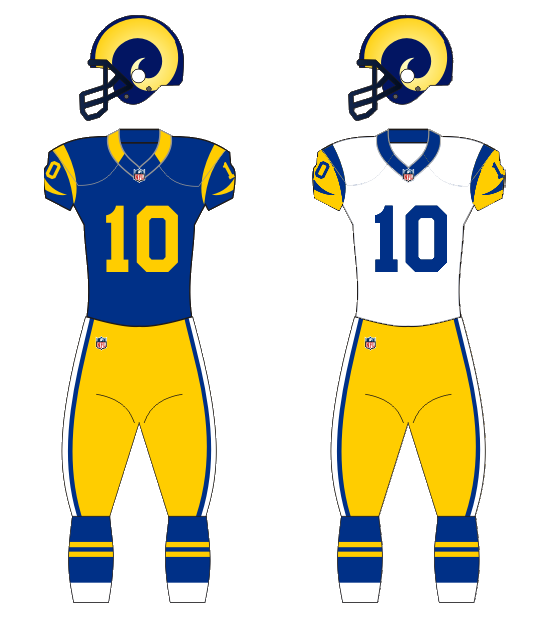

The 1998 St. Louis Rams season was the team's 61st year with the National Football League (NFL) and the fourth season in St. Louis. It was the second year for head coach Dick Vermeil. The team failed to improve on its 5–11 record from 1997, and instead finished the season 4–12 and missed the playoffs for the ninth consecutive season, during which they had compiled a league-worst 45–99 record.

Despite all of this, the Rams showed signs of life during the season when they beat playoff teams such as the New York Jets (who would make the AFC Championship game during the season) and the New England Patriots (who would make a wild card). Some claim that those two wins helped them build signs of strong life into next season, when they won Super Bowl XXXIV against the Tennessee Titans. Despite the Rams finishing 4–12, six of those losses were only by a touchdown or less. The 1998 season also marked the NFL debut of Kurt Warner, who served as the team's third-string quarterback behind Tony Banks and Steve Bono. According to The Washington Post, Warner appeared in only one game, the season finale against the San Francisco 49ers, completing four of 11 passes for 39 yards. He subsequently became the Rams' starting quarterback in 1999 and led the team to victory in Super Bowl XXXIV.

== Offseason ==
Additions	Subtractions
QB Steve Bono (Packers)	QB Will Furrer (Jaguars)
WR Ricky Proehl (Bears)	DE Leslie O'Neal (Chiefs)
DT Ray Agnew (Giants)	WR Torrance Small (Colts)
DT Joe Phillips (Chiefs)	FB Craig Heyward (Colts)
DE Mike Jones (Patriots)	P Mike Horan (Bears)
LB Eric Hill (Cardinals)	LB Robert Jones (Dolphins)
S Ron Carpenter	DT Bill Johnson (Eagles)
P Rick Tuten (Seahawks)	

=== NFL draft ===
1998 St. Louis Rams draft
Round	Pick	Player	Position	College	Notes
1	6	Grant Wistrom	Defensive end	Nebraska	
2	37	Robert Holcombe	Fullback	Illinois	
3	65	Leonard Little	Defensive end	Tennessee	
4	96	Az-Zahir Hakim	Wide receiver	San Diego State	
5	129	Raymond Priester	Fullback	Clemson	
6	159	Glenn Roundtree	Guard	Clemson	
7	236	Jason Chorak	Linebacker	Washington	
Made roster

=== Undrafted free agents ===
1998 Undrafted free agents of note
Player	Position	College
Daryl Bush	Linebacker	Florida State
Roger Chanoine	Tackle	Temple
London Fletcher	Linebacker	John Carroll
Kadar Hamilton	Safety	Stanford
Tony Horne	Wide receiver	Clemson
Jeremy McKinney	Tackle	Iowa
Fred Pollack	Guard	Nebraska
Russell Shaw	Wide receiver	Michigan
Glenn Young Jr.	Defensive end	Vanderbilt

== Roster ==
1998 St. Louis Rams roster
Quarterbacks (QB): 13 Steve Bono; 10 Kurt Warner; Running backs (RB): 33 Derrick Harris; 26 June Henley; 25 Robert Holcombe; 31 Amp Lee; 44 Jerald Moore; 28 David Thompson; Wide receivers (WR): 81 Az-Zahir Hakim; 82 Tony Horne; 88 Eddie Kennison; 87 Ricky Proehl; 16 Donald Sellers; 83 J. T. Thomas; Tight ends (TE): 89 Tyji Armstrong; 46 Mitch Jacoby; 49 Chad Lewis; 86 Roland Williams	Offensive linemen (OL): 77 Ethan Brooks T; 63 John Flannery C; 70 Wayne Gandy T; 60 Mike Gruttadauria C; 66 Jeremy McKinney G; 73 Fred Miller G; 76 Orlando Pace T; 50 Ryan Tucker G; 72 Zach Wiegert G; Defensive linemen (DL): 99 Ray Agnew DT; 93 Kevin Carter DE; 75 D'Marco Farr DT; 90 Mike Jones DE; 66 Joe Phillips DT; 95 Corey Sears DT; 96 Jay Williams DE; 98 Grant Wistrom DE	Linebackers (LB): 56 Charlie Clemons MLB; 59 London Fletcher MLB; 53 Jon Hesse OLB; 54 Eric Hill MLB; 52 Mike Jones OLB; 58 Roman Phifer OLB; 55 Phillip Ward OLB; Defensive backs (DB): 20 Taje Allen CB; 24 Ron Carpenter FS; 22 Billy Jenkins SS; 41 Todd Lyght CB; 35 Keith Lyle FS; 24 Dexter McCleon CB; 47 Ryan McNeil CB; 37 Mike Scurlock SS; Special teams (ST): 94 Jeff Robinson LS; 11 Rick Tuten P; 14 Jeff Wilkins K	Practice squad: -- Ron Powlus QB; Reserve: 12 Tony Banks QB (IR); 80 Isaac Bruce WR (IR); 64 Roger Chanoine T (IR); 84 Ernie Conwell TE (IR); 27 Greg Hill RB (IR); 57 Leonard Little LB (NF-Inj.); 23 Gerald McBurrows S (IR); 61 Tom Nütten G (IR); 51 Lorenzo Styles LB (IR); 32 Toby Wright S (IR); 53 active, 10 inactive, 1 practice squad Rookies in italics

== Regular season ==
=== Schedule ===
Week	Date	Opponent	Result	Record	Venue	Attendance
1	September 6	**New Orleans Saints**	**L** 17–24	0–1	Trans World Dome	56,943
2	September 13	Minnesota Vikings	**L** 31–38	0–2	Trans World Dome	56,234
3	September 20	at Buffalo Bills	**W** 34–33	1–2	Ralph Wilson Stadium	65,199
4	September 27	Arizona Cardinals	**L** 17–20	1–3	Trans World Dome	55,832
5	Bye					
6	October 11	New York Jets	**W** 30–10	2–3	Trans World Dome	55,938
7	October 18	at Miami Dolphins	**L** 0–14	2–4	Pro Player Stadium	65,418
8	October 25	**San Francisco 49ers**	**L** 10–28	2–5	Trans World Dome	58,563
9	November 1	at **Atlanta Falcons**	**L** 15–37	2–6	Georgia Dome	37,996
10	November 8	at Chicago Bears	**W** 20–12	3–6	Soldier Field	50,263
11	November 15	at **New Orleans Saints**	**L** 3–24	3–7	Louisiana Superdome	46,430
12	November 22	**Carolina Panthers**	**L** 20–24	3–8	Trans World Dome	50,716
13	November 29	**Atlanta Falcons**	**L** 10–21	3–9	Trans World Dome	47,971
14	December 3	at Philadelphia Eagles	**L** 14–17	3–10	Veterans Stadium	66,155
15	December 13	New England Patriots	**W** 32–18	4–10	Trans World Dome	48,946
16	December 20	at **Carolina Panthers**	**L** 13–20	4–11	Ericcson Stadium	50,047
17	December 27	at **San Francisco 49ers**	**L** 19–38	4–12	3Com Park	68,386
Note: Intra-division opponents are in **bold** text.

== Standings ==
NFC West
	W	L	T	PCT	PF	PA	STK
^{(2)} Atlanta Falcons	14	2	0	.875	442	289	W9
^{(4)} San Francisco 49ers	12	4	0	.750	479	328	W1
New Orleans Saints	6	10	0	.375	305	359	L3
Carolina Panthers	4	12	0	.250	336	413	W2
St. Louis Rams	4	12	0	.250	285	378	L2
