= Worst to First =

Worst to first may refer to:

- Worst to First (TV series), a 2017 Canadian television series
- Worst-to-First, a concept in the National Football League (NFL)
