= The Greatest Show on Turf =

Nickname for offenses of the St. Louis Rams during some NFL seasons

"The Greatest Show on Turf" was a nickname for the high-flying offense of the St. Louis Rams during the 1999, 2000, and 2001 National Football League (NFL) seasons. The offense was designed by attack-oriented offensive coordinator (during the 1999 season) and head coach (during the 2000 and 2001 seasons) Mike Martz who mixed an aerial attack and a run offense in an Air Coryell-style offense. The Rams' offense during these three seasons produced record scoring and yardage, three NFL MVP honors, two Super Bowl appearances (1999 and 2001 seasons), and one championship (1999 season). In 2000, the team set an NFL record with 7,335 total offensive yards (broken in 2011 by the New Orleans Saints with 7,474). Of those, 5,492 were passing yards, also an NFL team record.

The offense aimed to put all five receivers into patterns that stretched the field, setting up defensive backs with route technique, allowing the quarterback to deliver to a spot on time where the receiver could make the catch and turn upfield. The system saw frequent pre-snap motion and shifting, often including shifts to or from empty backfield formations or bunch formations. Pass protection was critical. At least two of the five receivers would run a deep in, skinny post, comeback, speed out, or shallow cross pattern, and running backs would often run quick rail routes out of the backfield. Screens, draws, and play action passes were often used to slow the opponent's pass rush. Mike Martz said the offensive system was invented by Sid Gillman and refined at San Diego State by Don Coryell, who later transmitted his system to the NFL. Martz learned the Coryell 3-digit system from offensive coordinator Ernie Zampese when they coached for the Rams under Chuck Knox in 1994–96.

== Background ==
The first nickname for the Rams offense of the 2000 season was "The Warner Brothers", a play on the movie studio and a reference to new quarterback Kurt Warner, who had assumed leadership from center after slated starter Trent Green was injured against San Diego in the preseason, and his receivers.

Several weeks into the 2000 season, ESPN's Chris Berman, preparing to cover highlights of a 57–31 win over the San Diego Chargers that year, told viewers, "Forget Ringling Brothers; the Rams are the Greatest Show on Earth" — a reference to the circus' longtime marketing slogan. Over the following weeks, "Earth" was replaced with "Turf", alluding to the artificial playing surface of the Trans World Dome and its suitability for the Rams' speedy offense. The term was also retroactively applied to the 1999 team, as the offensive philosophy and key players were the same.

That year, Berman and his highlight show NFL Primetime frequently alluded to the circus when covering the Rams. For the Chargers-Rams highlights that introduced the term "The Greatest Show on Turf," the William Tell Overture was played over the highlights rather than a standard NFL Primetime theme. The music was then muted when the Chargers were shown scoring a touchdown on the highlights package, and muted again when a flashback to Trent Green's injury was shown (Because the Rams were leading by so much in this game, Green came into the game in the second half making this his first regular season game since the injury, hence the flashback. The music resumed with Green leading the Rams to yet another touchdown). When the Rams finally lost in Week 8 to the Chiefs, a special introductory screen for the Rams as "The Greatest Show on Turf" was shown as a parody of "The Greatest Show on Earth" logo before the highlights of the upset were shown. Near the end of the 2000 Week 15 episode of NFL Primetime, Berman was briefly revealing the last two games that would be shown before cutting to a commercial break, as was standard for the show. The last game shown that week was the Vikings-Rams matchup. Since the Vikings also had a high-flying offensive attack (and, like the Rams, a poor defense), Berman announced, "The Greatest Show on Turf meet the Ringling Brothers and Barnum & Bailey!" Berman's nickname for the Vikings didn't stick.

The Greatest Show on Turf was anchored by running back Marshall Faulk, NFL Offensive Player of the Year for three consecutive years from 1999 through 2001, quarterback Kurt Warner, 2-time NFL MVP, the receiving duo of Isaac Bruce and Torry Holt, as well as Az-Zahir Hakim and veteran Ricky Proehl. Together they formed the nucleus of the first team in NFL history to score 500+ points in three consecutive seasons. Quarterback Kurt Warner and running back Marshall Faulk finished first and second in MVP voting each of the three years, also an achievement unmatched by any offense in NFL history.

The Rams went 13–3, 10–6, and 14–2 in those three seasons, respectively, and reached the playoffs every year. In 1999, the team reached Super Bowl XXXIV and defeated the Tennessee Titans to claim the first franchise championship in almost half a century. The Rams lost in the first round of the 2000 playoffs to the New Orleans Saints, but returned the next year to reach Super Bowl XXXVI, where they ultimately fell to the New England Patriots.

== Records and achievements ==
- The St. Louis Rams scored 526 points in the 1999 season, a team record which was broken in 2000 when they accumulated 540 points. For their last consecutive 500+ season, the Rams scored 503 points in 2001. These three seasons of 1,569 points were the most points scored by any team over any three-year stretch.
- 1999: The Rams were first in the league in passing (4,580 yards), yards per pass attempt (8.64), passing touchdowns (41) and total offensive yards (6,639).
- 2000: The Rams were first in the league in total offense (7,335 yards), completions (380), passing yards (5,492), yards per pass attempt (9.36), passing touchdowns (37) and rushing touchdowns (26). Their 63 offensive touchdowns was 5 more than the 1998 Vikings, and only 4 less than the 2007 Patriots.
- 2001: The Rams were again first in the league in total offense (6,930 yards), completions (379), passing yards (4,903), yards per pass attempt (8.90), passing touchdowns (37), rushing touchdowns (20) and yards per rush attempt (4.87)

== Players ==
=== Kurt Warner ===
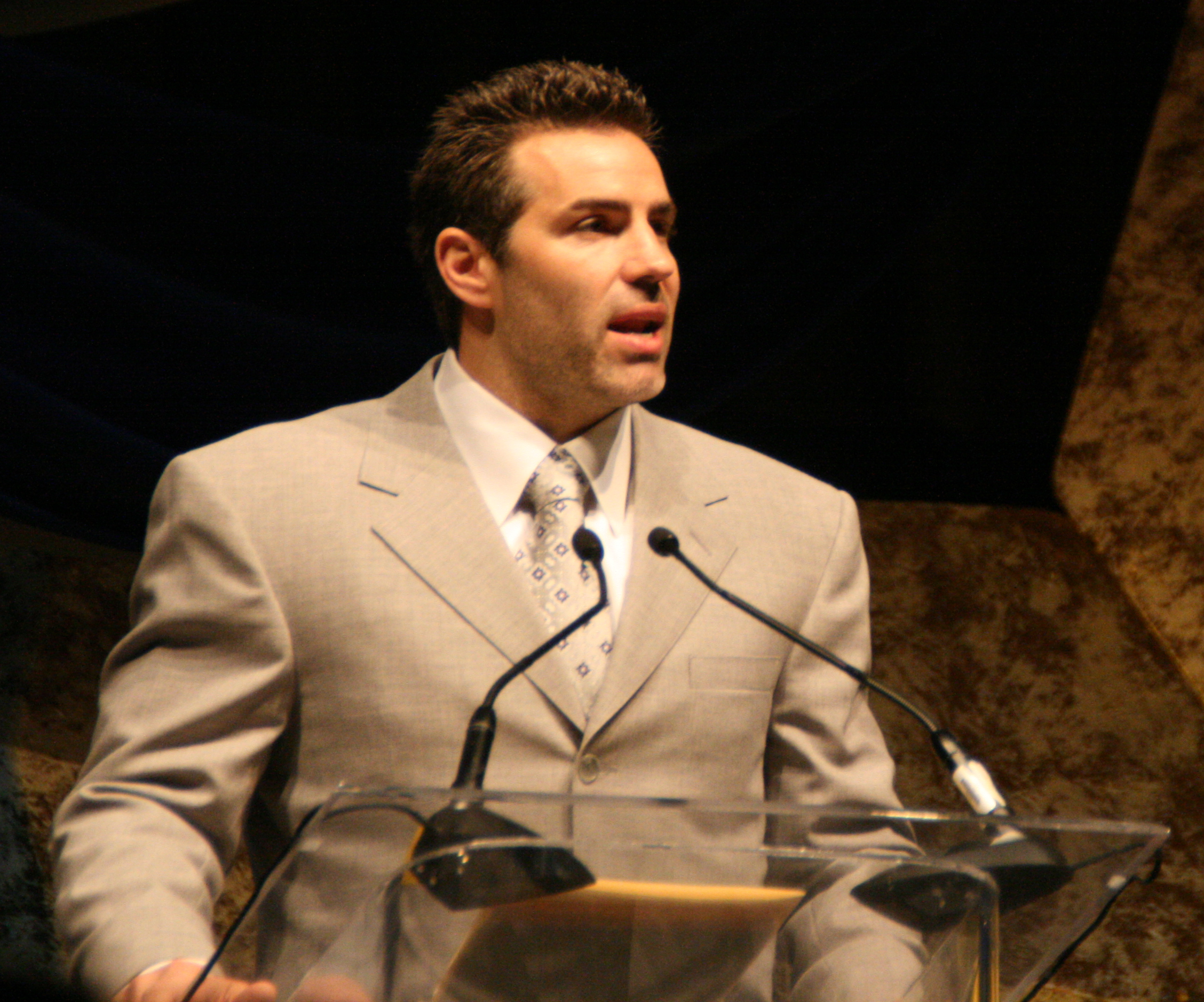

Quarterback Kurt Warner was cut in training camp by the Green Bay Packers in 1994, then three seasons later had a workout with the Chicago Bears fall through due to a scorpion sting he got on his honeymoon. After being cut by the Packers, Warner stocked shelves at a Hy-Vee supermarket in Cedar Falls, Iowa. He was a starter with the Iowa Barnstormers of the Arena Football League and then continued to the Amsterdam Admirals of NFL Europe before ultimately signing with the Rams as a backup to Tony Banks.

After Trent Green was injured in the 1999 pre-season and would miss the regular season, many speculated that St. Louis would miss the playoffs. Vermeil named Warner the starting quarterback, further stating; "We will rally around Kurt Warner, and we will play good football." The Rams — and Warner in particular — lit up defenses throughout the league. Warner threw 41 touchdown passes, setting a new franchise mark, and his 109.2 quarterback rating was the third highest (for a minimum of 200 attempts) in a season next to Joe Montana (112.4) and Steve Young (112.8). (The record now is owned solely by Aaron Rodgers after his record-breaking 2011 season.)

The Rams finished 13–3, a franchise best record for the 16 game schedule, which the 2001 Rams would break when they finished 14–2. Offensive coordinator Mike Martz's innovative variation on the Coryell offensive system suited Warner well; he threw only 13 interceptions during the regular season. For his innovation, Martz would be regarded as one of the most ingenious coordinators of his time. The Rams first demolished the Minnesota Vikings in the divisional round in a shoot-out, where Warner burned the Minnesota secondary for 391 yards and five touchdowns en route to victory. In the NFC Championship, the Rams faced the Tampa Bay Buccaneers, coached by Tony Dungy. Facing one of the league's best defenses, Warner had one of the worst postseason performances of his career, throwing three interceptions to the heavily loaded Buccaneers defense which featured Warren Sapp, Derrick Brooks, John Lynch, Donnie Abraham, and Ronde Barber. However, the Rams proved they were more than just a good offensive team, as they prevented Tampa Bay from scoring any touchdowns, allowed only two field goals, and intercepted Shaun King twice. Trailing 6–5 late in the 4th quarter, Warner engineered the game-winning drive culminating in the go-ahead touchdown pass to Ricky Proehl to send the Rams to the Super Bowl with an 11–6 victory.

Warner went on to throw for a then Super Bowl record 414 yards, with two touchdown passes, including a dramatic 73-yard game winner to Isaac Bruce, against the Tennessee Titans in Super Bowl XXXIV, winning Super Bowl MVP honors. He continued to play for the Rams through 2003. After leaving the Rams, Warner played for the New York Giants in 2004 before signing with the Arizona Cardinals in 2005, playing with them until his retirement after the 2009 season. While with Arizona, he led the team to their first ever Super Bowl appearance in Super Bowl XLIII, losing 27–23 in the final seconds to the Pittsburgh Steelers. Warner was elected to the Pro Football Hall of Fame as part of the class of 2017.

=== Marshall Faulk ===
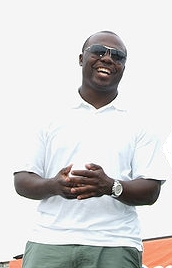

The second overall pick in the 1994 draft, running back Marshall Faulk was traded from the Indianapolis Colts to St. Louis in 1999. Faulk had been an elite player in Indianapolis, but in St. Louis he put up some of the best all-purpose numbers in the history of the NFL. Indianapolis finished 13–3 but were knocked off in the first round, while the Rams went on to win Super Bowl XXXIV.

It was a storybook season. Faulk's patience and diligence in learning the Rams offense paid off when he totaled 2,429 yards from scrimmage, eclipsing Barry Sanders' 2,358 yards set in 1997. With 1,381 yards rushing (a superb 5.5 yards-per-carry average) and 1,048 receiving yards, Faulk joined Roger Craig as the only men to total 1,000+ yards in each category in a season (they were joined in 2019 by Christian McCaffrey). For all this effort and success, he was named Offensive Player of the Year and starter for the NFC squad in the 2000 Pro Bowl.

Faulk was the MVP in 2000, and again the Offensive Player of the Year. In just 14 games (he missed two), he had 1,359 yards rushing and scored 26 touchdowns, the latter a record (that would soon be broken by Priest Holmes, then by Shaun Alexander, and later LaDainian Tomlinson in 2006). Faulk had 18 scores on the ground, setting a new franchise record, and eight through the air. He also averaged more than five yards per carry again, this time with 5.4.

From 1999 to 2001, Marshall Faulk scored 59 touchdowns, rang up 6,765 yards of offense (4,122 rushing and 2,643 receiving), and won the Most Valuable Player award and three Offensive Player of the Year awards. He was also named All-NFC, ALL-NFL, and selected for the Pro Bowl in each of those years. In 2011, Faulk was inducted to the Pro Football Hall of Fame in his first year of eligibility.

=== Isaac Bruce ===
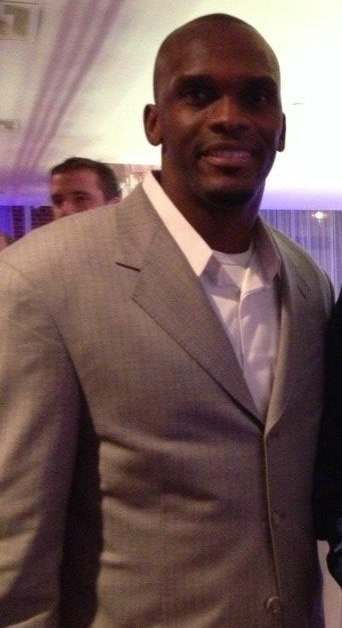

Bruce was selected in the 2nd round (33rd overall pick) of the NFL draft in 1994, by the Los Angeles Rams.

Wide receiver Isaac Bruce was drafted by the Los Angeles Rams and played for the franchise from the 1990s through the "Greatest Show on Turf" era.

Over his Rams career, he had 14,209 yards receiving, 942 receptions, 8 1,000+ Seasons, 40 100+ yardage games and 84 receiving touchdowns, all of which remain team records.

Bruce's most notable catch came in Super Bowl XXXIV. With under 2:00 minutes left in the game, he caught a 73-yard pass from quarterback Kurt Warner, which ultimately would clinch the Rams' first Super Bowl win.

In 1995, he had 1,781 receiving yards, second only to Jerry Rice (1,848) and was 5th ever for receptions (119). During the 1996 season, he led the league in yards (1,338). In 1999, Bruce totaled 1,165 yards receiving on only 77 receptions (15.2 yards per reception) and led the Rams with 12 touchdowns.

He was selected into the Pro Football Hall of Fame in 2020.

=== Torry Holt ===
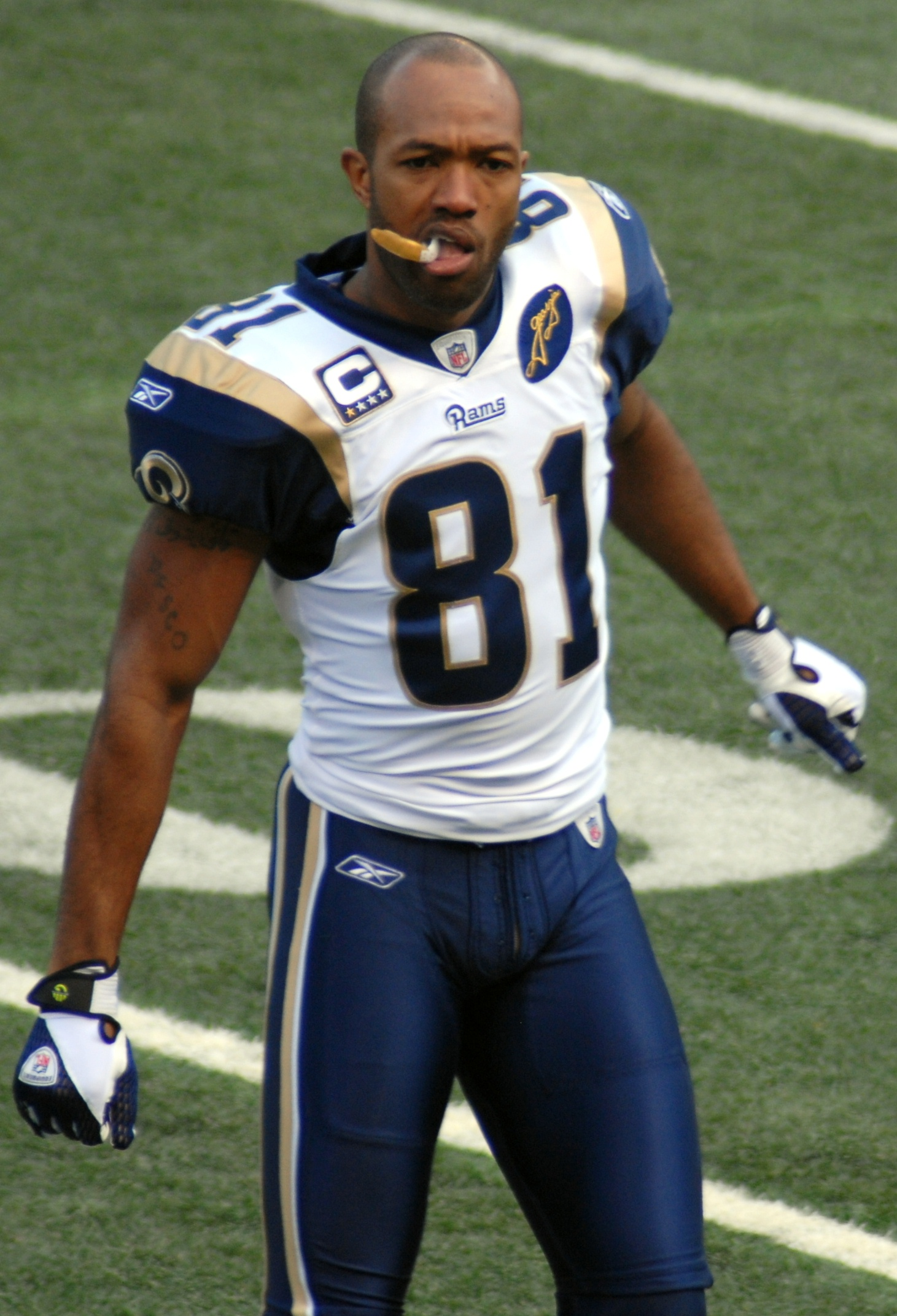

A rookie during the Rams' 1999 Super Bowl championship season, Torry Holt became one of the premier wide receivers in the league. In 9 years, he had 7 Pro Bowl invitations. Holt also averaged the most receiving yards per season, and he had two 1,600 yard seasons, giving him a feat matched only by Antonio Brown, Calvin Johnson and Marvin Harrison. He reached 10,000 (116 games) and 11,000 (130 games) career receiving yards faster than any other player in NFL history. He holds the record for most receptions in a single decade (868, 2000–2009) and also most receiving yards in a single decade (12,594, 2000–2009), and therefore made the NFL 2000s All-Decade Team. Holt led the league in receptions in 2003 and yards in 2000 and 2003, that year the Rams went 12–4 (missing out on homefield advantage due to an upset loss to the Detroit Lions), and lost in double overtime against the eventual NFC Champion Carolina Panthers.

=== Az-Zahir Hakim ===
Hakim was another player instrumental to the success of "the Greatest Show on Turf". He was with the Rams for four seasons (1998 to 2001) before being signed as a free agent to the Detroit Lions. During the 1999 season, he caught 36 passes for 677 yards, which would bring in 8 touchdowns for the Rams. For his four-season run with the Rams, he accumulated a total of 2,032 yards with 16 touchdown receptions. Additionally, Hakim served as the team's punt returner and was among the league leaders in 1999 and 2000.

=== Ricky Proehl ===
Wide receiver Ricky Proehl played in the NFL for 17 seasons and spent five of these with the St. Louis Rams between 1998 and 2002. During this period he was able to accumulate a total of 207 receptions and 2,590 receiving yards. At the 2000 NFC Championship, he caught the winning touchdown that allowed the Rams to beat Tampa Bay 11–6. Again, he caught a touchdown pass late in the game during Super Bowl XXXVI which at the time tied the game at 17–17, but the Patriots kicked a last-second field goal to win 20–17. He would go on to be a valuable cog in the Carolina Panthers' offense during their Super Bowl year, and he also had a stint with the Colts.

=== Orlando Pace ===
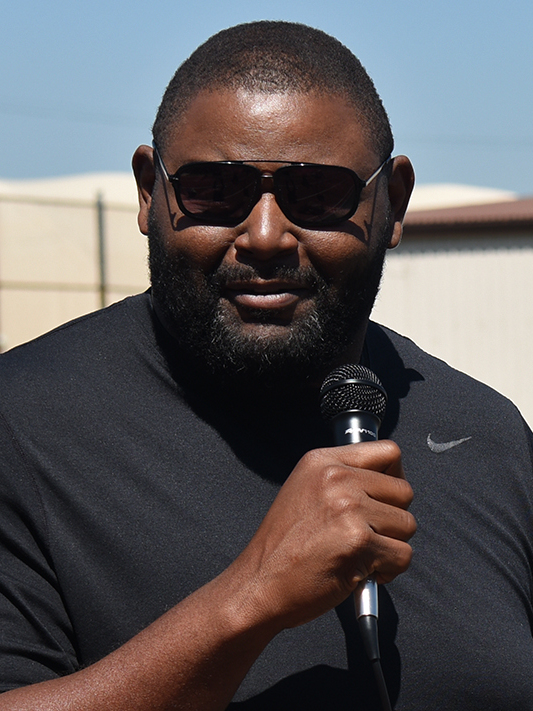

Left tackle Orlando Pace was selected by the Rams with the number one overall draft selection in the 1997 NFL draft after the Rams traded their number six overall pick, as well as third, fourth, and seventh round selections to the New York Jets. As a star at Ohio State University, a two-time Lombardi Award winner and an Outland Trophy winner, Pace was projected to be the top pick after Peyton Manning chose to defer the 1997 Draft. Pace became the first offensive lineman to be drafted first overall since 1968. In his NFL career, Pace became a seven-time Pro-Bowler and was the anchor of the offensive line for the Rams during this period of offensive dominance and is considered one of the best left tackles of the 21st century. Pace was elected to the Pro Football Hall of Fame as part of the Class of 2016.

=== Roland Williams ===
Drafted in the 4th round of the 1998 NFL draft, Roland Williams was the Rams rookie of the year. As the starting tight end in 1999, he blocked for many of Faulk's runs, caught Kurt Warner's first touchdown pass as starting quarterback, and caught five more during the regular season and Super Bowl.

== Afterwards ==
Many Rams fans consider 1999, 2000, and 2001 as the "Greatest Show on Turf" years, though the nickname was used for several subsequent seasons. In 2002, the team went 7-9 and failed to make the playoffs for the first time in three seasons; many referred to this as a "Super Bowl Hangover" for the Rams because they lost a Super Bowl they were favored so heavily to win to the New England Patriots. In 2003, the Rams won the NFC West again and had a first-round bye, but lost 29-23 in a dramatic double-overtime Divisional game to the eventual NFC champion Carolina Panthers; it was the last NFL playoff game ever held in St. Louis, as the Rams never won another division title during their remaining years there. In 2004, the Rams went 8-8 and upset the division rival Seattle Seahawks 27-20 on the road in the Wild Card round, but were subsequently blown out 47-17 by the Atlanta Falcons in the Divisional round. The Rams did not return to the playoffs again until 2017, when they were back in their old home in Los Angeles. The Rams lost 2018's Super Bowl LIII to the Patriots and beat the Bengals in 2021's Super Bowl LVI three years later.

Kurt Warner struggled with the team after Super Bowl XXXVI, and with the emergence of Marc Bulger, was made expendable and released following the 2003 season; he would later return to form and lead the Arizona Cardinals to Super Bowl XLIII, where they narrowly lost to the Pittsburgh Steelers. Warner retired after the 2009 season. Bruce, the team's all-time leading receiver and the team's last remaining player that was with the team in Los Angeles, was released by the Rams after the 2007 season after 14 years with the team and spent the next two years with the archrival San Francisco 49ers before returning to retire as a Ram in 2010. Marshall Faulk retired in 2007 after missing the 2006 season with injuries, while Ricky Proehl retired the same offseason after stints in Carolina and Indianapolis. Az-Zahir Hakim retired as a free agent. Torry Holt was released in 2009 and signed as a free agent with the Jacksonville Jaguars. Soon after, he was released by the Jaguars. On April 20, 2010, he signed a one-year deal with the New England Patriots, but was placed on injured reserve in August and released shortly after that, and has retired. The last active player from the 1999 team, London Fletcher, retired after the 2013 season.

On July 23, 2016, many of the star players from this era of the St. Louis Rams reunited for the "Legends of the Dome" game, a charity flag football game organized by Isaac Bruce. It gave fans the chance to see the Rams in St. Louis one last time, as the franchise had announced its return to Los Angeles a few months earlier.

== Pro Football Hall of Fame ==
Four players and one coach that were a part of "The Greatest Show on Turf" have been inducted into the Pro Football Hall of Fame:

- Marshall Faulk, RB (2011)
- Orlando Pace, OT (2016)
- Kurt Warner, QB (2017)
- Isaac Bruce, WR (2020)
- Dick Vermeil, head coach (2022)

== See also ==
- 1999 St. Louis Rams season
- 2000 St. Louis Rams season
- 2001 St. Louis Rams season
- List of NFL nicknames
- Ringling Bros. and Barnum & Bailey Circus (origin of the nickname)
