= Jeff Robinson (American football) =

American football player (born 1970)

No. 94, 45, 85, 87, 49
- Positions: Defensive end, tight end, long snapper

Personal information
- Born: February 20, 1970 (age 56); Spokane, Washington, U.S.
- Listed height: 6 ft 4 in (1.93 m)
- Listed weight: 264 lb (120 kg)

Career information
- High school: Joel E. Ferris (Spokane)
- College: Idaho (1988–1992)
- NFL draft: 1993: 4th round, 98th overall pick

Career history
- Denver Broncos (1993–1996); St. Louis Rams (1997–2001); Dallas Cowboys (2002–2004); St. Louis Rams (2005); Seattle Seahawks (2007–2009)

Awards and highlights
- Super Bowl champion (XXXIV); 2× First-team Little All-American (1991, 1992); 3× First-team All-Big Sky (1990–1992); 2× Big Sky Defensive Player of the Year (1991, 1992)

Career NFL statistics
- Receptions: 28
- Receiving yards: 278
- Receiving touchdowns: 8
- Tackles: 19
- Sacks: 6.5
- Fumble recoveries: 4
- Stats at Pro Football Reference

Jeffrey William Robinson (born February 20, 1970) is an American former professional football player who was a long snapper, tight end and defensive end in the National Football League (NFL). He played college football for the Idaho Vandals as a four-year starter at defensive end. He was selected in the fourth round of the 1993 NFL draft by the Denver Broncos with the 98th overall pick. Robinson later played for the Dallas Cowboys, Seattle Seahawks and the St. Louis Rams where he earned a Super Bowl ring in Super Bowl XXXIV.

== Early life ==
Born in Spokane, Washington, Robinson attended Joel E. Ferris High School, where he was a three-time letterman in football for the Saxons. He was also a two-time letterman in basketball and baseball, and graduated in 1988. In football, Robinson was a three-time All-Greater Spokane League selection as a tight end and as a linebacker.

== College career ==
Robinson played college football at the University of Idaho in Moscow, 90 miles (140 km) south, where he was a member of the Sigma Nu fraternity and majored in finance. A sack artist from 1989 to 1992, he brought down opposing quarterbacks 57.5 times in his career, which is the best in Vandals history and nearly 20 better than the next best mark. Robinson made 90 tackles in the backfield, which ranks second at Idaho, and he gathered 277 total tackles to rank 13th. He was voted as the team's Most Valuable Defensive Player three years in a row from 1990 to 1992.

As a true freshman in 1988, Robinson redshirted for the season. In 1989, as a redshirt freshman, he started nine games, recording 38 tackles, eight sacks, three forced fumbles, three fumble recoveries and three interceptions. As a sophomore, he was an All-Big Sky academic selection while winning All-Big Sky and Defensive MVP honors with 83 tackles, 16 sacks and 21 tackles for losses. As a junior in 1991, he was named Second-team All-America and First-team All-Big Sky as he recorded 77 tackles, 20 sacks and 28 tackles-for-losses and he was chosen to three All-America teams. As a senior in 1992, he was named All-America, All-Big Sky Conference and conference Defensive Player of the Year after ending his senior season with 79 tackles, 13.5 sacks, 27 tackles-for-losses, 35 quarterback pressures, six forced fumbles and five passes defensed. The Vandals were 9–2 in the regular season and conference co-champions.

== Professional career ==
Robinson was selected in the fourth round of the 1993 NFL draft by the Denver Broncos, as a defensive end, with the 98th overall pick.

=== Denver Broncos ===
As a rookie in 1993, Robinson played in all 16 games, recording 13 tackles, 3.5 sacks, two fumble recoveries and a forced fumble. In 1994, he played mainly on special teams, however he did record a career-high 14 tackles from the defensive end position. In 1995, he played along the defensive line, recording eight tackles, a pass defensed and one fumble recovery. In his first season as a long snapper in Denver, he helped Kicker Jason Elam tie for second in the NFL in scoring among kickers. In 1996, as the Broncos' long snapper, Robinson played in all 16 games and the playoff game against the Jacksonville Jaguars. He also played at defensive end in reserve roles.

=== St. Louis Rams ===
In 1997, Robinson was signed by the St. Louis Rams as an unrestricted free agent. In 1997, he played in 16 games and recorded six tackles and 12 special teams tackles - fourth on the team. In 1998, he recorded five tackles and four quarterback pressures while adding 11 special teams tackles. He was the team's long snapper, helping Punter Rick Tuten finish fourth in the NFC with an average of 44.2 yards-per-punt. Robinson recorded his first NFL touchdown on a four-yard pass from Quarterback Steve Bono against the Carolina Panthers. In 1999, Robinson continued his seven-year streak of playing in every game despite making the switch from Defensive end to Tight end, after showing ability at the position on the scout team, and continuing in the role of long snapper. He started nine games at tight end, finishing with six receptions for 76 yards and two touchdowns. He recorded his first post-season touchdown on a 13-yard pass in the Divisional Playoff Game against the Minnesota Vikings en route to winning Super Bowl XXXIV. In 2000, he once again played in all 16 games while starting two games at tight end. He ended the season with five receptions for 52 yards while adding five special teams tackles. With his help at long snapper, kicker Jeff Wilkins led the league and tied the league record for field goal percentage in a season, making all 17 attempts. In 2001, he started a career-high nine games, finishing with 11 receptions for 108 yards and a touchdown while adding five special teams tackles serving as the team's long snapper.

=== Dallas Cowboys ===
On March 5, 2002, Robinson signed with the Dallas Cowboys. However, on August 20, he tore his ACL during training camp. He was placed on Injured reserve on August 27, ending his streak of 144 consecutive games played through his career, and underwent surgery on September 13. He missed the season while rehabilitating from the surgery. However, while on Injured reserve, he joined other injured Cowboys players on Thanksgiving week to attend a holiday party for 200 terminally ill and mentally challenged children hosted by Papas Brothers Steakhouse in Dallas.

In 2003, his first active in Dallas, he played in all 16 games, and recorded two receptions for eight yards, both for touchdowns. In 2004, he played in all 16 games and recorded two receptions for two yards, both for touchdowns, as well as three special teams tackles.

In 2005 Robinson became the first Long Snapper to be added to a Pro Bowl roster specifically for Long Snapping. He was out of the country when the announcement was made, and consequently did not play in the game.

On September 4, 2005, he was released by the Cowboys.

=== St. Louis Rams (second stint) ===
On September 5, 2005, Robinson re-signed with the Rams as a security measure at long snapper, behind Chris Massey. In 2005, Robinson played in five games with one start, and recorded one reception for 28 yards.

=== Seattle Seahawks ===
After spending the 2006 season out of football, Robinson signed with the Seattle Seahawks in December 2007 and played in three games.

After rookie long snapper Tyler Schmitt was placed on injured reserve on August 26, 2008, the Seahawks re-signed Robinson . For the season, Robinson played in all 16 games and recorded six special teams tackles.

Robinson was re-signed by the Seahawks on December 22, 2009, after long snapper Kevin Houser was placed on injured reserve with a collapsed lung.
