= Jay Williams (American football) =

American football player (born 1971)

No. 96, 77, 91
- Position: Defensive end

Personal information
- Born: October 13, 1971 (age 55); Washington, D.C., U.S.
- Listed height: 6 ft 3 in (1.91 m)
- Listed weight: 275 lb (125 kg)

Career information
- High school: St. John's College (Washington, D.C.)
- College: Wake Forest
- NFL draft: 1994: undrafted

Career history
- Miami Dolphins (1994)*; Green Bay Packers (1994)*; Los Angeles / St. Louis Rams (1994–1996); Amsterdam Admirals (1996); St. Louis Rams (1997–1999); Carolina Panthers (2000–2001); Miami Dolphins (2002–2004); St. Louis Rams (2005)*
- * Offseason or practice squad member only

Awards and highlights
- Super Bowl champion (XXXIV)

Career NFL statistics
- Tackles: 177
- Sacks: 23.5
- Interceptions: 2
- Stats at Pro Football Reference

Jay Omar Williams (born October 13, 1971) is an American former professional football player who was a defensive end in the National Football League (NFL) from 1994 to 2004. He played for the Amsterdam Admirals of NFL Europe, the Miami Dolphins, Los Angeles / St. Louis Rams, and Carolina Panthers. He played college football for the Wake Forest Demon Deacons.

== NFL career statistics ==
Legend
	Won the Super Bowl
**Bold**	Career high

Year	Team	Games		Tackles				Interceptions				Fumbles			
Year	Team	GP	GS	Comb	Solo	Ast	Sck	Int	Yds	TD	Lng	FF	FR	Yds	TD
1995	STL	7	0	0	0	0	0.0	0	0	0	0	0	0	0	0
1996	STL	2	0	0	0	0	0.0	0	0	0	0	0	0	0	0
1997	STL	16	2	7	4	3	1.0	0	0	0	0	0	0	0	0
1998	STL	16	1	14	10	4	1.0	0	0	0	0	0	0	0	0
1999	STL	16	0	18	16	2	4.0	0	0	0	0	0	0	0	0
2000	CAR	16	14	27	21	6	**6.0**	0	0	0	0	1	0	0	0
2001	CAR	16	13	**39**	**27**	12	1.0	**1**	0	0	0	0	0	0	0
2002	MIA	16	0	22	17	5	**6.0**	0	0	0	0	0	0	0	0
2003	MIA	16	0	12	8	4	2.5	0	0	0	0	0	**2**	0	0
2004	MIA	16	1	38	21	**17**	2.0	**1**	0	0	0	**2**	0	0	0
		137	31	177	124	53	23.5	2	0	0	0	3	2	0	0
