= Ricky Proehl =

American football player and coach (born 1968)

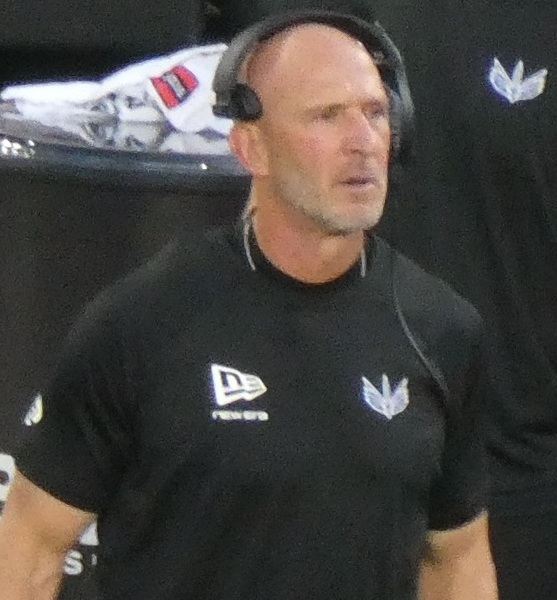
- Proehl with the St. Louis Battlehawks in 2026

St. Louis Battlehawks
- Title: Head coach

Personal information
- Born: March 7, 1968 (age 58); The Bronx, New York, U.S.
- Listed height: 6 ft 0 in (1.83 m)
- Listed weight: 190 lb (86 kg)

Career information
- Position: Wide receiver (No. 87, 88, 81, 11)
- High school: Hillsborough (Hillsborough, New Jersey)
- College: Wake Forest (1986–1989)
- NFL draft: 1990: 3rd round, 58th overall pick

Career history

Playing
- Phoenix / Arizona Cardinals (1990–1994); Seattle Seahawks (1995–1996); Chicago Bears (1997); St. Louis Rams (1998–2002); Carolina Panthers (2003–2005); Indianapolis Colts (2006)

Coaching
- Carolina Panthers (2011–2012) Offensive assistant; Carolina Panthers (2013–2016) Wide receivers coach; St. Louis Battlehawks (2023) Wide receivers coach; St. Louis Battlehawks (2026–present) Head coach

Awards and highlights
- 2× Super Bowl champion (XXXIV, XLI); PFWA All-Rookie Team (1990); First-team All-ACC (1989)

Career NFL statistics
- Receptions: 669
- Receiving yards: 8,878
- Receiving touchdowns: 54
- Stats at Pro Football Reference

Head coaching record
- Regular season: 6–4 (.600)
- Postseason: 0–1 (.000)
- Career: 6–5 (.545)

Richard Scott Proehl (born March 7, 1968) is an American football coach and former professional player who is currently the head coach of the St. Louis Battlehawks of the United Football League (UFL). As a player, he was a wide receiver in the National Football League (NFL) for 17 seasons with the Phoenix/Arizona Cardinals, Seattle Seahawks, Chicago Bears, St. Louis Rams, Carolina Panthers, and Indianapolis Colts. He played in four Super Bowls and won two: Super Bowl XXXIV with the Rams and Super Bowl XLI with the Colts. He is remembered as a member of the Rams' "Greatest Show on Turf".

After his playing career, Proehl was an assistant coach for the Carolina Panthers through the 2016 season. He returned to the Super Bowl as a coach with the Panthers in 2016. He later returned to the St. Louis Battlehawks as wide receivers coach in 2023 and was named the team's head coach in December 2025 ahead of the 2026 season.

== Early life ==
Proehl graduated in 1986 from Hillsborough High School in Hillsborough, New Jersey, where he starred in both football and baseball. During his senior season in football, he caught 42 passes for 900+ yards and 13 touchdowns. For his efforts that year, he was named a New York All-Metro selection, the Somerset County Player of the Year, and an All-State pick.

== College career ==
Proehl played college football at Wake Forest University, where he was a four-year letterman in football. He finished his career holding school records for receiving yards (2,949 yards), touchdowns (25), and the single-season receiving yards (1,053). He also ranked in the top five in receptions and receiving average. He ended his college career playing in the Blue–Gray Football Classic and the East-West All-Star Game.

On February 8, 2002, he was inducted into the Wake Forest Sports Hall of Fame. In 2011, he was inducted into the North Carolina Sports Hall of Fame.

== Professional career ==
Pre-draft measurables
Height	Weight	Arm length	Hand span	40-yard dash	10-yard split	20-yard split	20-yard shuttle	Vertical jump	Broad jump
5 ft 10 3/4 in (1.80 m)	181 lb (82 kg)	29 1/2 in (0.75 m)	9 1/2 in (0.24 m)	4.58 s	1.60 s	2.71 s	4.01 s	34.0 in (0.86 m)	9 ft 9 in (2.97 m)
All values from NFL Combine

Proehl was taken in the third round (58th overall) of the 1990 NFL draft by the Phoenix Cardinals. He set the Cardinals rookie record for receptions and became the first rookie to lead the team in receptions since Bob Shaw in 1950. He played four more seasons for the Cardinals before being traded to the Seattle Seahawks for a draft pick before the 1995 season. He spent two seasons with the Seahawks, playing as a backup and accepting a pay cut. He then signed with the Chicago Bears for the 1997 season, and led the team in receiving categories with 58 receptions, 753 yards, and seven touchdowns.

Proehl signed with the St. Louis Rams for the start of the 1998 season on a four-year $6 million contract. As part of "The Greatest Show on Turf", he helped lead the Rams to a championship in the 1999 season at Super Bowl XXXIV, catching a 30-yard pass from Kurt Warner with 4:44 remaining in the NFC Championship that gave them a 11–6 lead; the Rams held on to win the game and advance to the Super Bowl. He caught six passes for 100 yards in that game, which was his best postseason performance in his career. In the Super Bowl, he caught one pass for eleven yards. Two seasons later, he helped the Rams reach Super Bowl XXXVI against the New England Patriots. He caught three passes for 71 yards while also losing a fumble with a touchdown, which tied the game at 17 late in the fourth quarter before the Patriots rallied to win the game. Before the game, Proehl, extremely confident that the Rams would win, said to an NFL films camera crew "Tonight, a dynasty is born, baby!" While a dynasty was born that day, it was the Patriots' dynasty as New England defeated the Rams, marking the end of the Rams' Greatest Show on Turf era.

Proehl spent one more season with the Rams in 2002, then signed with the Carolina Panthers as a free agent at the start of the 2003 season. With Carolina, he caught five combined passes in the subsequent postseason run by the Panthers to Super Bowl XXXVIII, but four of them were in the Super Bowl against the New England Patriots, which included a touchdown catch with 1:08 remaining to tie the game at 29. However, the Patriots rallied to win the game on a last-second field goal. He considered retirement after losing the Super Bowl, but was talked out of it by Panthers quarterback Jake Delhomme and coach John Fox, returning for his 15th and 16th NFL season. Proehl retired following the 2005 season, and began working as a color analyst with the Rams' television pre-season games and the Rams radio network on various shows and pre-games.

On November 29, 2006, Proehl came out of retirement to join the Indianapolis Colts, replacing injured wide receiver Brandon Stokley. He played in two regular season games, recording three receptions, and was part of the Colts team that won Super Bowl XLI.

== Coaching career ==
Proehl was hired by the Carolina Panthers on February 1, 2011, as an Offensive Consultant. He was hired to primarily work with the wide receivers. He was Pro Football Focus's second runner up in their Wide Receiver Coach of the Year award.

In the 2015 season, Proehl and the Panthers reached Super Bowl 50 on February 7, 2016. The Panthers fell to the Denver Broncos by a score of 24–10.

Proehl was hired as wide receivers coach by the St. Louis Battlehawks on September 13, 2022. One of the players he coached with the Battlehawks was his son Austin Proehl. He did not return for the 2024 season.

Proehl was named head coach of the St. Louis Battlehawks ahead of the 2026 season.

== NFL career statistics ==
Year	Team	Games		Receiving				
Year	Team	GP	GS	Rec	Yds	Avg	Lng	TD
1990	PHO	16	2	56	802	14.3	45	4
1991	PHO	16	16	55	766	13.9	62	2
1992	PHO	16	15	60	744	12.4	63	3
1993	PHO	16	16	65	877	13.5	51	7
1994	ARI	16	16	51	651	12.8	63	5
1995	SEA	8	0	5	29	5.8	9	0
1996	SEA	16	7	23	309	13.4	56	2
1997	CHI	15	10	58	753	13.0	78	7
1998	STL	16	11	60	771	12.9	47	3
1999	STL	15	2	33	349	10.6	30	0
2000	STL	12	4	31	441	12.4	27	4
2001	STL	16	2	40	563	14.1	37	5
2002	STL	16	2	43	466	10.8	33	4
2003	CAR	16	2	27	389	14.4	66	4
2004	CAR	16	3	34	497	14.6	34	0
2005	CAR	16	2	25	441	17.6	69	4
2006	IND	2	1	3	30	10.0	13	0
Career		244	109	669	8,878	13.3	78	54

=== Super Bowl statistics ===
- Super Bowl XXXIV: 1 reception, 11 yards – St. Louis 23, Tennessee 16
- Super Bowl XXXVI: 3 receptions, 71 yards, 1 touchdown – New England 20, St. Louis 17
- Super Bowl XXXVIII: 4 receptions, 71 yards, 1 touchdown – New England 32, Carolina 29
- Proehl did not catch a pass in Super Bowl XLI.

=== Achievements ===
Proehl is known for his role in three memorable playoff games:

- As a member of the Rams in the 1999 NFC Championship Game against the Tampa Bay Buccaneers, Proehl recorded six receptions for 100 yards and caught the game-winning touchdown pass with 4:44 to play. The Rams won 11–6 and went on to win the Super Bowl.
- Two years later, in Super Bowl XXXVI against the New England Patriots, with the Rams trailing 17–10, Proehl caught a touchdown pass with 1:30 to play to tie the game, but the Patriots won on a last-second field goal by Adam Vinatieri, 20–17.
- Two years after that, in Super Bowl XXXVIII against New England, this time as a member of the Panthers, Proehl again caught a touchdown pass with 1:08 remaining in the fourth quarter to tie the game. However, the Patriots won the game on another last-second field goal by Vinatieri, 32–29.
- Proehl and Vinatieri became teammates in Indianapolis and were part of the Colts team that won Super Bowl XLI.

== Head coaching record ==
Team	Year	Regular season					Postseason			
Team	Year	Won	Lost	Ties	Win %	Finish	Won	Lost	Win %	Result
STL	2026	6	4	0	.600	2nd	0	1	.000	Lost to Louisville Kings in UFL Semifinals
Total		6	4	0	.600		0	1	.000	

== Personal life ==
Proehl and his wife, Kelly, live in Greensboro, North Carolina. The couple has three children: one daughter named Alex, and two sons named Austin and Blake. Austin played wide receiver at the University of North Carolina. He was selected in the 2018 NFL draft by the Buffalo Bills as the 255th overall pick, and is currently a wide receiver with the St. Louis Battlehawks of the UFL, where he is coached by his father. Blake played wide receiver for East Carolina University, and was signed as an undrafted free agent to the Minnesota Vikings.

Proehl owns, manages, and coaches at Proehlific Park, which is a sports performance complex and fitness center he built in Greensboro, North Carolina.
