= Billy Jenkins (American football) =

American football player (born 1974)

No. 22, 32, 23, 24
- Position: Safety

Personal information
- Born: July 8, 1974 (age 52); Los Angeles, California, U.S.
- Listed height: 5 ft 10 in (1.78 m)
- Listed weight: 205 lb (93 kg)

Career information
- High school: Albuquerque
- College: Howard
- NFL draft: 1997: undrafted

Career history
- St. Louis Rams (1997–1999); Denver Broncos (2000–2001); Green Bay Packers (2001); Buffalo Bills (2002)

Awards and highlights
- Super Bowl champion (XXXIV)
- Stats at Pro Football Reference

Billy Leon Jenkins Jr. (born July 8, 1974, in Los Angeles, California) is an American former professional football player who was a safety in the National Football League. After playing college football at Stonehill college for the Howard Bison, he played in the NFL for the St. Louis Rams (1997–1999), Denver Broncos (2000–2001), Green Bay Packers (2001), and Buffalo Bills (2002). He played in Super Bowl XXXIV for the Rams where he started at safety. After the 1999 season, the Rams traded Jenkins to the Denver Broncos for a fifth-round pick in the 2000 NFL Draft.

He is an alumnus of Howard University. Jenkins is currently a defensive backs coach at his alma mater.

== NFL stats ==
Year	Team	GP	COMB	TOTAL	AST	SACK	FF	FR	FR YDS	INT	IR YDS	AVG IR	LNG	TD	PD
1997	STL	16	13	8	5	0.0	0	0	0	0	00	0.00	00	0	0
1998	STL	16	81	64	17	3.0	0	0	0	2	31	15.5	25	0	0
1999	STL	16	72	50	22	1.0	0	0	0	2	16	8.00	14	0	0
2000	DEN	16	0	0	0	0.0	0	0	0	4	61	15.2	36T	1	0
2001	DEN	06	03	03	00	0.0	0	0	0	0	00	0.00	00	0	0
2001	GB	06	03	02	01	0.0	0	0	0	0	00	0.00	00	0	0
2002	BUF	15	05	02	03	0.0	0	0	0	0	00	0.00	00	0	0
Career		91	11	7	4	4.0	0	0	0	8	108	12.9	36	1	0
