= Lionel Barnes =

American football player (born 1976)

No. 92, 94
- Position: Defensive end

Personal information
- Born: April 19, 1976 (age 50); New Orleans, Louisiana, U.S.
- Listed height: 6 ft 5 in (1.96 m)
- Listed weight: 260 lb (118 kg)

Career information
- High school: Lakenheath (UK) American
- College: Louisiana–Monroe
- NFL draft: 1999: 6th round, 176th overall pick

Career history
- St. Louis Rams (1999–2000); Indianapolis Colts (2000–2001); Jacksonville Jaguars (2003–2004)

Career NFL statistics
- Tackles: 19
- Sacks: 2
- Stats at Pro Football Reference

Lionel Barnes Jr. (born April 19, 1976) is an American former professional football player who was a defensive end in the National Football League (NFL). He played for the St. Louis Rams, the Indianapolis Colts, and the Jacksonville Jaguars.

== College career ==
Barnes played defensive end at the University of Louisiana-Monroe, leading the team in sacks with 16 in 1998, his senior season.

== Professional career ==
=== Pre-draft ===
Pre-draft measurables
Height	Weight	40-yard dash	10-yard split	20-yard split	20-yard shuttle	Three-cone drill	Vertical jump	Broad jump	Bench press	Wonderlic
6 ft 4 7/8 in (1.95 m)	264 lb (120 kg)	5.00 s	1.73 s	2.91 s	4.52 s	7.51 s	34 in (0.86 m)	9 ft 4 in (2.84 m)	24 reps	x
All from NFL Combine.

=== St. Louis Rams ===
Barnes was selected by the Rams in the sixth round of the 1999 NFL draft and was on the roster for two seasons, playing in four games.

=== Indianapolis Colts ===
After he was released by the Rams, the Colts signed Barnes and he played in seven games over the 2000 and 2001 NFL seasons.

=== Jacksonville Jaguars ===
In 2003, Barnes was signed by the Jacksonville Jaguars. In his first season there he played in 13 games and made 13 tackles plus two sacks. The following year, he earned the starting job and started the first three games of the season. The Jaguars placed Barnes on injured reserve in mid-October because of a shoulder injury. Barnes was hurt September 19, 2004, against Denver.

On April 4, 2005, the Jacksonville Jaguars released Barnes.
