= Willie Jones (offensive lineman) =

American football player (born 1975)

No. 73, 75
- Position: Offensive tackle

Personal information
- Born: December 17, 1975 (age 50); Belle Glade, Florida, U.S.
- Listed height: 6 ft 6 in (1.98 m)
- Listed weight: 355 lb (161 kg)

Career information
- High school: Glades Central (Belle Glade)
- College: Grambling State
- NFL draft: 1999: undrafted

Career history
- St. Louis Rams (1999); Seattle Seahawks (2000)*; Miami Dolphins (2000)*; Kansas City Chiefs (2000–2002)
- * Offseason or practice squad member only

Awards and highlights
- Super Bowl champion (XXXIV)
- Stats at Pro Football Reference

Willie J. Jones (born December 17, 1975) is an American former professional football player who was an offensive tackle for two seasons with the Kansas City Chiefs of the National Football League (NFL). He played college football for the UCF Knights, Morgan State Bears, and Grambling State Tigers.

== Early life and college ==
Willie J. Jones was born on December 17, 1975, in Belle Glade, Florida. He attended Glades Central High School in Belle Glade.

Jones was a member of the UCF Knights from 1994 to 1995, the Morgan State Bears in 1996, and the Grambling State Tigers from 1997 to 1998.

== Professional career ==
Jones signed with the St. Louis Rams on April 30, 1999, after going undrafted in the 1999 NFL draft. He was placed on the reserve/non-football injury list on November 24, 1999, before appearing in any games for the Rams. On January 30, 2000, the Rams won Super Bowl XXXIV against the Tennessee Titans. He was waived on February 9, 2000.

Jones was claimed off waivers by the Seattle Seahawks on February 15, 2000. He was released on March 22, 2000.

Jones signed with the Miami Dolphins on March 23, 2000. He was later released on August 26, 2000.

Jones was signed to the practice squad of the Kansas City Chiefs on November 29, 2000. He was promoted to the active roster on December 15, 2000, but did not play in any games that season. He played in 12 games for the Chiefs during the 2001 season. Jones became a free agent after the season and re-signed with Kansas City on April 8, 2002. He appeared in six games in 2002 before being placed on injured reserve on November 20, 2002. He became a free agent again after the 2002 season and re-signed with the Chiefs again on April 11, 2003. Jones retired on August 19, 2003.
