= Worst-to-First =

American National Football League term

In the National Football League (NFL), "going from worst-to-first" refers to a team winning its division the season following a last-place divisional finish. The inverse scenario, in which a team goes from first-to-worst in their division, has also been observed. The NFL's current division alignment has been in place since the 2002 season and sees both conferences–the American Football Conference (AFC) and National Football Conference (NFC)–have four divisions each, for a total of eight in the league. These conferences are mostly based on geography and have names to reflect this (e.g., the AFC East and NFC North).

While the concept is often covered by sportswriters as it pertains to the NFL, teams in other sports leagues have also been documented going from worst-to-first.

== History in the NFL ==
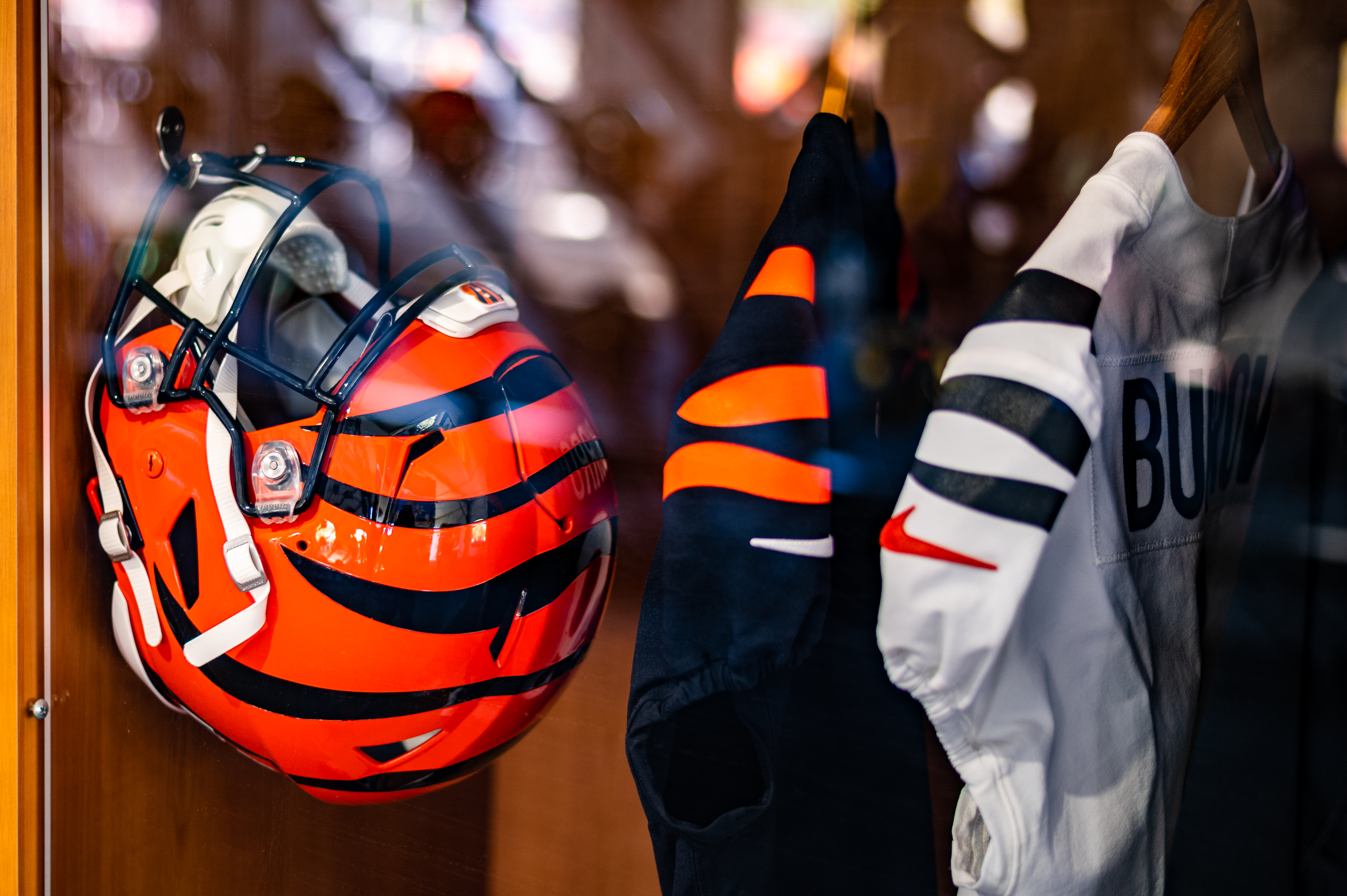
The Cincinnati Bengals have gone from worst-to-first a record five times.

After finishing last in the Central Division of the NFL's Western Conference in 1967, the Minnesota Vikings won the division title the following season. Their worst-to-first turnaround in 1968 makes them hold the distinction of being the only team to do so prior to the league's merger with the American Football League (AFL). The merger brought along with it the NFL's modern divisional structure, with the 1970 season being the first following the merger. That season saw two teams accomplish the worst-to-first feat: the Cincinnati Bengals and the San Francisco 49ers. The latter went from a last-place finish in the NFL Coastal Division to winning its spiritual successor, the NFC West. The Bengals, however, finished last in the AFL Western division in 1969 but were not a member of the post-merger AFC West in 1970. Instead, the Bengals were placed in the AFC Central division, which they won. The Bengals also have the distinction of having the most worst-to-first seasons, with five (1970, 1981, 1988, 1990, and 2021).

With the 1978 season, NFL schedule makers began creating the regular season schedule with a team's divisional ranking from the previous season in mind. As a result, last-place divisional finishers play a "last-place schedule", which can positively impact their ability to improve their record.

Beginning with the 2002 season, the league realigned its division structure to have four each in both conferences. Since the league's realignment in 2002, most seasons have seen at least one team go from worst-to-first. The 2002, 2014, 2019, and 2024 seasons featured no such teams. Two teams have accomplished the feat in the same season on multiple occasions, with 2018 being the most recent occurrence of this. This also happened three times prior to the 2002 realignment (1970, 1999, and 2001). From 2003–2006, all four NFC South teams traded worst-to-first seasons: the Carolina Panthers achieved the feat in 2003, with the Atlanta Falcons, Tampa Bay Buccaneers, and New Orleans Saints replicating the feat in 2004, 2005, and 2006, respectively. The Buccaneers went worst-to-first again in 2007, making the division have five consecutive instances of a worst-to-first team.

Four worst-to-first teams have ultimately won the Super Bowl: the 1999 St. Louis Rams, the 2001 New England Patriots, the 2009 New Orleans Saints, and the 2017 Philadelphia Eagles. Four other teams to achieve a worst-to-first season also made Super Bowl appearances, albeit in losing efforts: three of the aforementioned Bengals teams (1981, 1988, 2021), and the 2003 Carolina Panthers.

Due to the frequency of the worst-to-first feat being accomplished, particularly since the 2002 realignment, NFL media publications and sportswriters often speculate during NFL off-seasons about which last-place divisional finishers will produce turn-around seasons. These off-season publications often rank the eight divisions' last-place finishers in terms of most likely to go from worst-to-first. Sportswriters have also noted the phenomenon as contributing to the NFL's parity and fan optimism, citing worst-to-first instances as examples of quick turnarounds being able to materialize.

=== First-to-Worst ===
The inverse scenario, in which a division champion finishes in last place the following season, has also been observed by NFL media. The Cincinnati Bengals who went from worst-to-first in 1970 then achieved the opposite feat the following season, as the 1971 Bengals squad finished in last place in their division. The Bengals franchise also has gone from first-to-worst a league-leading five times (1971, 1989, 1991, 2010, and 2023). The most recent instance of a team going from first-to-worst is the 2024 San Francisco 49ers, who won the NFC West in 2023, before finishing 6–11 in 2024. The 49ers had several key players sustain injuries that season, which is a common reason for teams documented to have considerable season-to-season decline in success; starters opting to retire or sign with another team in free agency have also been noted reasons for past first-to-worst falloffs.

=== List of teams to go from worst-to-first ===
Legend
†	Won the Super Bowl

Teams to go from worst-to-first
Season	Division	Team	Record	Playoff result	Previous finish	Ref.
Pre-merger
1968	NFL Central	Minnesota Vikings	8–6	Lost in Western Conference championship game	4th, 3–8–3	
Post-merger
1970	AFC Central	Cincinnati Bengals	8–6	Lost in AFC Divisional round	5th, 4–9–1 (Note: in AFL Western Division)	
1970	NFC West	San Francisco 49ers	10–3–1	Lost in NFC Championship Game	4th, 4–8–2 (Note: in NFL Coastal Division)	
1972	NFC Central	Green Bay Packers	10–4	Lost in NFC Divisional round	4th, 4–8–2	
1975	AFC East	Baltimore Colts	10–4	Lost in AFC Divisional round	5th, 2–12	
1979	NFC Central	Tampa Bay Buccaneers	10–6	Lost in NFC Championship Game	5th, 5–11	
1981	AFC Central	Cincinnati Bengals	12–4	Lost in Super Bowl XVI	4th, 6–10	
1987	AFC East	Indianapolis Colts	9–6	Lost in NFC Divisional round	5th, 3–13	
1988	AFC Central	Cincinnati Bengals	12–4	Lost in Super Bowl XXIII	4th, 4–11	
1990	AFC Central	Cincinnati Bengals	9–7	Lost in AFC Divisional round	4th, 8–8	
1991	AFC West	Denver Broncos	12–4	Lost in AFC Championship Game	5th, 5–11	
1992	AFC West	San Diego Chargers	11–5	Lost in AFC Divisional round	5th, 4–12	
1993	NFC Central	Detroit Lions	10–6	Lost in NFC Wild Card round	5th, 5–11	
1997	NFC East	New York Giants	10–5–1	Lost in NFC Wild Card round	5th, 6–10	
1999	AFC East	Indianapolis Colts	13–3	Lost in AFC Divisional round	5th, 3–13	
1999	NFC West	St. Louis Rams	13–3	Won Super Bowl XXXIV†	5th, 4–12	
2000	NFC West	New Orleans Saints	10–6	Lost in NFC Divisional round	5th, 3–13	
2001	AFC East	New England Patriots	11–5	Won Super Bowl XXXVI†	5th, 5–11	
2001	NFC Central	Chicago Bears	13–3	Lost in NFC Divisional round	5th, 5–11	
Since 2002 realignment
2003	AFC West	Kansas City Chiefs	13–3	Lost in AFC Divisional round	4th, 8–8	
2003	NFC South	Carolina Panthers	11–5	Lost in Super Bowl XXXVIII	4th, 7–9	
2004	AFC West	San Diego Chargers	12–4	Lost in AFC Wild Card round	4th, 4–12	
2004	NFC South	Atlanta Falcons	11–5	Lost in NFC Championship Game	4th, 5–11	
2005	NFC North	Chicago Bears	11–5	Lost in NFC Divisional round	4th, 5–11	
2005	NFC South	Tampa Bay Buccaneers	11–5	Lost in NFC Wild Card round	4th, 5–11	
2006	NFC East	Philadelphia Eagles	10–6	Lost in NFC Divisional round	4th, 6–10	
2006	NFC South	New Orleans Saints	10–6	Lost in NFC Championship Game	4th, 3–13	
2007	NFC South	Tampa Bay Buccaneers	9–7	Lost in NFC Wild Card round	4th, 4–12	
2008	AFC East	Miami Dolphins	11–5	Lost in AFC Wild Card round	4th, 1–15	
2009	NFC South	New Orleans Saints	13–3	Won Super Bowl XLIV†	4th, 8–8	
2010	AFC West	Kansas City Chiefs	10–6	Lost in AFC Wild Card round	4th, 4–12	
2011	AFC West	Denver Broncos	8–8	Lost in AFC Divisional round	4th, 4–12	
2012	NFC East	Washington Redskins	10–6	Lost in NFC Wild Card round	4th, 5–11	
2013	NFC East	Philadelphia Eagles	10–6	Lost in NFC Wild Card round	4th, 4–12	
2015	NFC East	Washington Redskins	9–7	Lost in NFC Wild Card round	4th, 4–12	
2016	NFC East	Dallas Cowboys	13–3	Lost in NFC Divisional round	4th, 4–12	
2017	AFC South	Jacksonville Jaguars	10–6	Lost in AFC Championship Game	4th, 3–13	
2017	NFC East	Philadelphia Eagles	13–3	Won Super Bowl LII†	4th, 7–9	
2018	AFC South	Houston Texans	11–5	Lost in AFC Wild Card round	4th, 4–12	
2018	NFC North	Chicago Bears	12–4	Lost in NFC Wild Card round	4th, 5–11	
2020	NFC East	Washington Football Team	7–9	Lost in NFC Wild Card round	4th, 3–13	
2021	AFC North	Cincinnati Bengals	10–7	Lost in Super Bowl LVI	4th, 4–11–1	
2022	AFC South	Jacksonville Jaguars	9–8	Lost in AFC Divisional round	4th, 3–14	
2023	AFC South	Houston Texans	10–7	Lost in AFC Divisional round	4th, 3–13–1	
2025	NFC North	Chicago Bears	11-6	Lost in NFC Divisional round	4th, 5–12	
2025	AFC East	New England Patriots	14-3	Lost in Super Bowl LX	4th, 4–13	

== In other sports ==
The feat is notably more common in the NFL than in the other major North American sports leagues; according to Elias Sports Bureau, two teams achieving the worst-to-first feat in their divisions in consecutive seasons "has never happened in MLB, NBA, or the NHL". However, the phenomenon has been observed in other sports. The Detroit Shock of the Women's National Basketball Association (WNBA) won the 2003 WNBA Finals one season after finishing with the worst record in their conference (9–23). In the National Basketball Association (NBA), the Boston Celtics finished at the bottom of the Eastern Conference with a 24–58 record in the 2006–07 season. The team's acquisition of Kevin Garnett and Ray Allen in the following off-season led to a significant turnaround in 2007–08, as the team won a league-best 66 games and the 2008 NBA Finals.

In Major League Baseball (MLB), the 1991 season saw both the Atlanta Braves and Minnesota Twins win their respective divisions after both teams finished in last place the previous season; the two teams then faced each other in the 1991 World Series, with the Twins emerging victorious. In 2013, the Boston Red Sox won the American League (AL) East division, as well as the 2013 World Series; the season prior, they posted a 69-93 record and finished last in their division.
