= Taje Allen =

American football player (born 1973)

No. 20, 26
- Position: Cornerback

Personal information
- Born: November 6, 1973 (age 53); Lubbock, Texas, U.S.
- Listed height: 5 ft 10 in (1.78 m)
- Listed weight: 185 lb (84 kg)

Career information
- High school: Lubbock (TX) Estacado
- College: Texas
- NFL draft: 1997: 5th round, 158th overall pick

Career history
- St. Louis Rams (1997–2000); Kansas City Chiefs (2001–2002)

Awards and highlights
- Super Bowl champion (XXXIV); Second-team All-SWC (1995); 1994 Sun Bowl champion

Career NFL statistics
- Tackles: 83
- Interceptions: 2
- Sacks: 0.5
- Stats at Pro Football Reference

Taje LaQayne Allen (born November 6, 1973) is an American former professional football player who played cornerback for six seasons for the St. Louis Rams, with whom he won Super Bowl XXXIV, and the Kansas City Chiefs in the National Football League (NFL).

== College career ==
Allen played college football at the University of Texas where he helped the Longhorns with the last two Southwest Conference Championships and the first Big 12 Championship. During that time he played in the Sun Bowl (which the Longhorns won), Sugar Bowl and Fiesta Bowl. He first gained notoriety during his sophomore year when he came off the bench and knocked down a potential game-tying two-point conversion pass to help Texas beat Pittsburgh.

During his junior year, he was the Sugar Bowl roommate of Rob Weaver, a 30 year old who, right before the Sugar Bowl, was discovered to have committed fraud - playing under the name Ron McKelvey - to extend his college playing days.

During his senior year he received a Big 12 Honorable Mention.

== Professional career ==
Allen was drafted 158th overall by the Rams in the fifth round of the 1997 NFL Draft. He played four seasons with the Rams during which time he started four games. His best season was 1999 when he started 2 games in place of an injured Dexter McCleon, recorded 2 interceptions (the only two of his NFL career) and had 36 combined tackles. He won a Super Bowl ring that season with the Rams. Though he did not play in Super Bowl XXXIV he knocked down a potentially game-winning 4th down pass into the end zone at the end of the NFC Championship Game.

Following the 2000 season he became an unrestricted free agent and was signed a two-year contract with the Chiefs. The Chiefs made him available for the expansion Texans after the 2001 but he was not selected in the expansion draft. He was released by the Chiefs a few months later, but signed with them again the next day. The 2002 season was his last in which he saw limited playing time, being inactive for all but 6 games.

After retiring from football, he moved to Cedar Park, Texas, where he got into sports management first working as an Event Operations Assistant at the University of Texas at Austin and then for the Austin Convention Center. He has three sons and a daughter. His son Eamon became a defensive back and kick returner for Sam Houston State.
