= Roland Williams =

American football player (born 1975)

No. 86, 81, 88
- Position: Tight end

Personal information
- Born: April 27, 1975 (age 51); Rochester, New York, U.S.
- Listed height: 6 ft 5 in (1.96 m)
- Listed weight: 265 lb (120 kg)

Career information
- High school: East (Rochester, New York)
- College: Syracuse
- NFL draft: 1998: 4th round, 98th overall pick

Career history
- St. Louis Rams (1998–2000); Oakland Raiders (2001–2002); Tampa Bay Buccaneers (2003); Oakland Raiders (2004); St. Louis Rams (2005)

Awards and highlights
- Super Bowl champion (XXXIV)

Career NFL statistics
- Receptions: 114
- Receiving yards: 1,004
- Total touchdowns: 13
- Stats at Pro Football Reference

Roland Lamar Williams (born April 27, 1975), is an American former professional football player who was a tight end for eight years in the National Football League (NFL). He played college football for the Syracuse Orange.

== Early life and college ==
Roland Williams was born in Rochester, New York and grew up in a challenging neighborhood. Roland attended Syracuse University and became the first person in his immediate family to graduate from a four-year college.

== Playing career ==
Roland Williams was selected in the 1998 National Football League Draft by the Saint Louis Rams in the fourth round with the 98th overall pick. He played professionally for eight years at the tight end position. Highlights include the 2002 American Football Conference Championship and the St. Louis Rams' Super Bowl XXXIV Championship in which Williams made one reception for a gain of nine yards.

Following his stint with the Rams, Roland played three years for the Oakland Raiders. The Raiders won the American Football Conference Championship in the 2002-2003 season. In 2003, Roland played one season with the Tampa Bay Buccaneers. In 2004, Roland returned to play another season with the Oakland Raiders and then the subsequent season with the St. Louis Rams before a career ending knee injury sidelined him in 2006.

Since retiring as a professional football player, Williams has worked as a television and radio sports analyst and keynote speaker. As a sports analyst for more than a decade, he has appeared on media outlets including CBS Sports Network, ESPN, MTV, NBC, NBC Sports Network, Nickelodeon, NFL Network, CNBC, Fox, Fox Sports Net, CBS, and ABC, where he currently works in Los Angeles. He has also contributed to radio, online, and print publications. In 2008, Williams coached a high school student aspiring to become a football player on the MTV reality series Made.

Williams has also appeared as a speaker at multiple TEDx events, where he has discussed leadership, performance, and life after professional sports.

Following his playing career, Williams has remained active in business and advisory roles. He currently serves as Managing Partner of Brown Diamond Concierge, a private real estate portfolio advisory that works with high-earning professionals, athletes, and executives. The firm focuses on long-term real estate strategy, portfolio design, and execution.

In addition to his professional work, Williams has participated in academic and advisory initiatives. He serves on the Sport Management Advisory Council at Syracuse University’s Falk College of Sport, supporting programs focused on leadership, education, and career development in the sports industry.
