= 2000 St. Louis Rams season =

NFL team season

- Owner: Georgia Frontiere
- General manager: Mike Martz and Charley Armey
- Head coach: Mike Martz
- Offensive coordinator: Bobby Jackson
- Defensive coordinator: Peter Giunta
- Home stadium: Trans World Dome

Results
- Record: 10–6
- Division place: 2nd NFC West
- Playoffs: Lost Wild Card Playoffs (at Saints) 28–31
- All-Pros: RB Marshall Faulk (1st team); OT Orlando Pace (2nd team); PR Az-Zahir Hakim (1st team)
- Pro Bowlers: QB Kurt Warner; RB Marshall Faulk; WR Isaac Bruce; WR Torry Holt; OT Orlando Pace

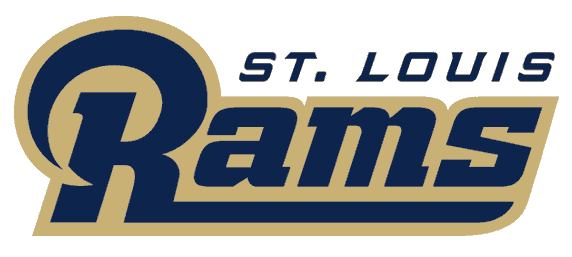
Script logo for the NFL franchise St. Louis Rams.

The 2000 season was the St. Louis Rams' 63rd in the National Football League (NFL) and their sixth in St. Louis. For the first time in franchise history, the Rams entered the season as the defending Super Bowl champions, and started 6–0 for the second straight season. The Rams finished the regular-season with a record of 10–6 but would go on to lose to the New Orleans Saints 31–28 in the wild-card round of the playoffs. They led the NFL in scoring for a second straight year with 540 points. The Rams became the first team in NFL history to score more than 500 points on offense while allowing more than 450 points on defense. They allowed more than 30 points in seven of their games and less than 20 points only once all season, a 16–3 loss to the Carolina Panthers in week 14.

Running back Marshall Faulk was named the MVP of the regular season. It was the second straight time a Rams player was named MVP.

After the resignation of Dick Vermeil, who had been the Rams' head coach through St. Louis' 1999 championship season, Mike Martz took over as head coach, and attempted to defend the Rams' Super Bowl XXXIV title. The Rams' "Greatest Show on Turf" continued its offensive dominance, scoring 33.8 points per game.

Statistically, Football Outsiders calculates that the 2000 Rams had the most efficient rushing attack of any single-season NFL team from 1993 to 2010. The 2000 Rams are one of only three teams in NFL history to score 35 points or more nine times in a single season. (Note: The other two are the 1948 49ers and the 2011 Packers) The Denver Broncos did it 10 times in 2013. The Rams' offense offset the team's defensive struggles: St. Louis' 471 points allowed in 2000 is the most ever surrendered by an NFL team with a winning record. The Rams had the best offense in the league, but had the worst defense in the league.

The season saw the Rams change their logo and uniforms. The team traded their blue and yellow uniforms for "New Century gold" and "Millennium blue" ones. St. Louis' new logo depicted a charging blue ram with a gold outline, matching the ram's horn. This logo would be in use for the rest of their tenure in St. Louis. After the season, Ray Agnew, Todd Collins, Steve Everitt, D'Marco Farr, and Pete Stoyanovich decided they had played their final NFL games. Troy Pelshak and Fernando Smith did, too, but they left St. Louis in the middle of the season, to go to Jacksonville for Pelshak, and back to Minnesota for Smith.

== Offseason ==
Additions	Subtractions
C Steve Everitt (Eagles)	C Mike Gruttadauria (Cardinals)
	QB Paul Justin (Cowboys)
	T Fred Miller (Titans)
	LB Charlie Clemons (Saints)
	DE Jay Williams (Panthers)
	S Billy Jenkins (Broncos)
	T Matt Willig (49ers)

=== NFL draft ===
2000 St. Louis Rams draft
Round	Pick	Player	Position	College	Notes
1	31	Trung Canidate	Running back	Arizona	
5	139	Brian Young	Defensive tackle	UTEP	
Made roster

=== Undrafted free agents ===
2000 undrafted free agents of note
Player	Position	College
Mark Chicarelli	Running back	Northern Colorado
Derek Fox	Safety	Penn State
Alex Hass	Tight end	Minnesota
Bill Marsaut	Tackle	Iowa State
Corte McGuffey	Quarterback	Northern Colorado

=== Staff ===
2000 St. Louis Rams staff
Front office: Chairman – Georgia Frontiere; Vice chairman – Stan Kroenke; President – John Shaw; President of football operations – Jay Zygmunt; General manager – Mike Martz and Charley Armey (Martz has final say on personnel decisions); Senior vice president of administration – Bob Wallace; Director of scouting – Lawrence McCutcheon; Administrator of pro personnel – Jack Faulkner; Head coaches: Head coach – Mike Martz; Associate head coach / wide receivers – Al Saunders; Assistant head coach / offensive line – John Matsko; Offensive coaches: Offensive coordinator/running backs – Bobby Jackson; Quarterbacks – John Ramsdell; Tight ends – Wilbert Montgomery; Offensive line – Jim Hanifan; Offensive assistant – Ken Zampese	Defensive coaches: Defensive coordinator – Peter Giunta; Defensive line – Carl Hairston; Linebackers – Mike Haluchak; Secondary – Steve Brown; Defensive assistant – Sam Clark; Defensive assistant – Howard Tippett; Special teams coaches: Special teams – Larry Pasquale; Strength and conditioning: Strength and conditioning – Chris Clausen; Strength and conditioning – Dana LeDuc

== Roster ==
2000 St. Louis Rams roster
Quarterbacks (QB): 9 Joe Germaine; 10 Trent Green; 13 Kurt Warner; Running backs (RB): 43 Chad Dukes; 28 Marshall Faulk; 42 James Hodgins FB; 25 Robert Holcombe; 33 Justin Watson FB; Wide receivers (WR): 83 Darrius Blevins; 80 Isaac Bruce; 81 Az-Zahir Hakim; 88 Torry Holt; 82 Tony Horne; 87 Ricky Proehl; 89 Chris Thomas; Tight ends (TE): 84 Ernie Conwell; 45 Jeff Robinson LS; 86 Roland Williams	Offensive linemen (OL): 60 Steve Everitt C; 67 Andy McCollum C; 61 Tom Nütten G; 76 Orlando Pace T; 73 Cameron Spikes G; 70 John St. Clair T; 68 Pete Swanson G; 62 Adam Timmerman G; 50 Ryan Tucker T; Defensive linemen (DL): 99 Ray Agnew DT; 93 Kevin Carter DE; 75 D'Marco Farr DT; 94 Gaylon Hyder DT; 91 Leonard Little DE; 77 Sean Moran DE; 98 Grant Wistrom DE; 66 Brian Young DT; 90 Jeff Zgonina DT	Linebackers (LB): 54 Todd Collins OLB; 56 Dustin Cohen OLB; 59 London Fletcher MLB; 52 Mike Jones OLB; 53 Keith Miller MLB; 51 Lorenzo Styles OLB; Defensive backs (DB): 20 Taje Allen CB; 32 Dré Bly CB; 27 Matt Bowen SS; 23 Devin Bush Sr. CB; 41 Todd Lyght CB; 35 Keith Lyle FS; 21 Dexter McCleon CB; 22 Jacoby Shepherd CB; 30 Shevin Smith FS; Special teams (ST): 4 John Baker P; 14 Jeff Wilkins K	Practice squad: -- Jonathan Brown DE; -- James Kidd WR; -- Mike Newell C; -- Anthony White RB; Reserve: -- Matt Beck OLB (IR); 24 Trung Canidate RB (IR); 38 Rich Coady S (IR); 72 Andrew Kline G (IR); 71 Kaulana Noa G (IR); Rookies in italics 53 active, 5 reserve, 4 practice squad

== Preseason ==
Week	Date	Opponent	Result	Record	Venue	Recap
1	August 5	Oakland Raiders	W 31–17	1–0	Trans World Dome	Recap
2	August 14	at Tennessee Titans	L 3–30	1–1	Adelphia Coliseum	Recap
3	August 19	Buffalo Bills	L 27–31	1–2	Trans World Dome	Recap
4	August 24	at Dallas Cowboys	W 24–17	2–2	Texas Stadium	Recap

== Regular season ==
=== Schedule ===
Week	Date	Opponent	Result	Record	Venue	Recap
1	September 4	Denver Broncos	**W** 41–36	1–0	Trans World Dome	Recap
2	September 10	at Seattle Seahawks	**W** 37–34	2–0	Husky Stadium	Recap
3	September 17	**San Francisco 49ers**	**W** 41–24	3–0	Trans World Dome	Recap
4	September 24	at **Atlanta Falcons**	**W** 41–20	4–0	Georgia Dome	Recap
5	October 1	San Diego Chargers	**W** 57–31	5–0	Trans World Dome	Recap
6	Bye					
7	October 15	**Atlanta Falcons**	**W** 45–29	6–0	Trans World Dome	Recap
8	October 22	at Kansas City Chiefs	**L** 34–54	6–1	Arrowhead Stadium	Recap
9	October 29	at **San Francisco 49ers**	**W** 34–24	7–1	3Com Park	Recap
10	November 5	**Carolina Panthers**	**L** 24–27	7–2	Trans World Dome	Recap
11	November 12	at New York Giants	**W** 38–24	8–2	Giants Stadium	Recap
12	November 20	Washington Redskins	**L** 20–33	8–3	Trans World Dome	Recap
13	November 26	**New Orleans Saints**	**L** 24–31	8–4	Trans World Dome	Recap
14	December 3	at **Carolina Panthers**	**L** 3–16	8–5	Ericsson Stadium	Recap
15	December 10	Minnesota Vikings	**W** 40–29	9–5	Trans World Dome	Recap
16	December 18	at Tampa Bay Buccaneers	**L** 35–38	9–6	Raymond James Stadium	Recap
17	December 24	at **New Orleans Saints**	**W** 26–21	10–6	Louisiana Superdome	Recap
Note: Intra-division opponents are in **bold** text.

=== Game summaries ===
==== Week 1: vs. Denver Broncos ====
Week 1: Denver Broncos at St. Louis Rams – Game summary

Quarter	1	2	3	4	Total
Broncos	7	10	10	9	**36**
**Rams**	7	14	14	6	**41**

at Trans World Dome, St. Louis, Missouri

- Date: September 4
- Game time: 8:00 p.m. CDT
- Game weather: indoors (dome)
- Game attendance: 65,956
- Referee: Gerry Austin
- TV announcers (ABC): Al Michaels, Dan Fouts, Dennis Miller, Melissa Stark and Eric Dickerson
- Recap, Game Book

Game information

**First quarter**

- DEN – Brian Griese 8-yard run (Jason Elam kick), 10:03. Broncos 7–0. **Drive: 6 plays, 59 yards, 3:14.**
- STL – Az-Zahir Hakim 86-yard punt return (Jeff Wilkins kick), 2:05. Tied 7–7.

**Second quarter**

- DEN – Jason Elam 32-yard field goal, 13:42. Broncos 10–7. **Drive: 8 plays, 56 yards, 3:23.**
- STL – Marshall Faulk 5-yard run (Jeff Wilkins kick), 8:53. Rams 14–10. **Drive: 9 plays, 89 yards, 4:49.**
- DEN – Rod Smith 25-yard pass from Brian Griese (Jason Elam kick), 3:50. Broncos 17–14. **Drive: 10 plays, 80 yards, 5:03.**
- STL – Ricky Proehl 7-yard pass from Kurt Warner (Jeff Wilkins kick), 0:38. Rams 21–17. **Drive: 9 plays, 77 yards, 3:12.**

**Third quarter**

- DEN – Jason Elam 38-yard field goal, 9:19. Rams 21–20. **Drive: 9 plays, 63 yards, 5:41.**
- STL – Marshall Faulk 72-yard pass from Kurt Warner (Jeff Wilkins kick), 8:09. Rams 28–20. **Drive: 2 plays, 72 yards, 1:10.**
- STL – Az-Zahir Hakim 80-yard pass from Kurt Warner (Jeff Wilkins kick), 4:02. Rams 35–20. **Drive: 3 plays, 87 yards, 1:23.**
- DEN – Desmond Clark 7-yard pass from Brian Griese (Jason Elam kick), 0:51. Rams 35–27. **Drive: 6 plays, 67 yards, 3:11.**

**Fourth quarter**

- DEN – Jason Elam 36-yard field goal, 7:32. Rams 35–30. **Drive: 8 plays, 62 yards, 3:27.**
- DEN – Terrell Buckley 32-yard interception return (run failed), 6:35. Broncos 36–35.
- STL – Robert Holcombe 1-yard rush (pass failed), 2:58. Rams 41–36. **Drive: 8 plays, 75 yards, 3:37.**

Top passers

- DEN – Brian Griese – 19/29, 307 yards, 2 TD
- STL – Kurt Warner – 25/35, 441 yards, 3 TD, 3 INT

Top rushers

- DEN – Olandis Gary – 13 rushes, 80 yards
- STL – Marshall Faulk – 14 rushes, 78 yards, TD

Top receivers

- DEN – Ed McCaffrey – 7 receptions, 115 yards
- STL – Torry Holt – 6 receptions, 103 yards

==== Week 2: at Seattle Seahawks ====
Week 2: St. Louis Rams at Seattle Seahawks – Game summary

Quarter	1	2	3	4	Total
**Rams**	3	10	7	17	**37**
Seahawks	3	7	10	14	**34**

at Husky Stadium, Seattle, Washington

- Date: September 10
- Game time: 3:15 p.m. CDT/1:15 p.m. PDT
- Game weather: Overcast, 62 °F (16.7 °C)
- Game attendance: 64,869
- Referee: Larry Nemmers
- TV announcers (Fox): Pat Summerall, John Madden and D. J. Johnson
- Recap, Game Book

Game information

**First quarter**

- SEA – Kris Heppner 19-yard field goal, 6:00. Seahawks 3–0. **Drive: 13 plays, 75 yards, 4:53.**
- STL – Jeff Wilkins 48-yard field goal, 0:32. Tied 3–3. **Drive: 9 plays, 39 yards, 5:28.**

**Second quarter**

- SEA - Jay Bellamy 84-yard interception return (Kris Heppner kick), 6:58. Seahawks 10–3.
- STL – Jeff Wilkins 48-yard field goal, 3:11. Seahawks 10–6. **Drive: 8 plays, 39 yards, 3:47.**
- STL – Robert Holcombe 1-yard run (Jeff Wilkins kick), 0:17. Rams 13–10. **Drive: 12 plays, 68 yards, 1:36.**

**Third quarter**

- SEA – Ricky Watters 3-yard run (Kris Heppner kick), 9:56. Seahawks 17–13. **Drive: 11 plays, 62 yards, 5:04.**
- STL – Marshall Faulk 1-yard run (Jeff Wilkins kick), 4:41. Rams 20–17. **Drive: 9 plays, 69 yards, 5:15.**
- SEA – Kris Heppner 43-yard field goal, 0:20. Tied 20–20. **Drive: 8 plays, 25 yards, 4:21.**

**Fourth quarter**

- STL – Roland Williams 4-yard pass from Kurt Warner (Jeff Wilkins kick), 11:32. Rams 27–20. **Drive: 7 plays, 80 yards, 3:48.**
- SEA – Ricky Watters 1-yard run (Kris Heppner kick), 7:40. Tied 27–27. **Drive: 8 plays, 80 yards, 3:52.**
- STL – Devin Bush 15-yard fumble recovery (Jeff Wilkins kick), 5:12. Rams 34–27.
- SEA – Darrell Jackson 34-yard pass from Jon Kitna (Kris Heppner kick), 2:05. Tied 34–34. **Drive: 7 plays, 71 yards, 3:07.**
- STL – Jeff Wilkins 27-yard field goal, 0:23. Rams 37–34. **Drive: 8 plays, 61 yards, 1:42.**

Top passers

- STL – Kurt Warner – 35/47, 386 yards, TD, INT
- SEA – Jon Kitna – 21/30, 245 yards, TD, 2 INT

Top rushers

- STL – Marshall Faulk – 15 rushes, 68 yards, TD
- SEA – Ricky Watters – 16 rushes, 59 yards, 2 TD

Top receivers

- STL – Torry Holt – 6 receptions, 101 yards
- SEA – Sean Dawkins – 6 receptions, 70 yards

==== Week 3: vs. San Francisco 49ers ====
Week 3: San Francisco 49ers at St. Louis Rams – Game summary

Quarter	1	2	3	4	Total
49ers	7	10	0	7	**24**
**Rams**	3	14	7	17	**41**

at Trans World Dome, St. Louis, Missouri

- Date: September 17
- Game time: 12:00 p.m. CDT
- Game weather: indoors (dome)
- Game attendance: 65,945
- Referee: Bernie Kukar
- TV announcers (Fox): Dick Stockton, Matt Millen and Pam Oliver
- Recap, Game Book

Game information

**First quarter**

- SF – Fred Beasley 29-yard pass from Jeff Garcia (Wade Richey kick), 14:29. 49ers 7–0. **Drive: 1 play, 29 yards, 0:06.**
- STL – Jeff Wilkins 47-yard field goal, 11:00. 49ers 7–3. **Drive: 7 plays, 49 yards, 3:29.**

**Second quarter**

- SF – Wade Richey 21-yard field goal, 10:45. 49ers 10–3. **Drive: 8 plays, 62 yards, 4:15.**
- STL – Tony Horne 18-yard pass from Kurt Warner (Jeff Wilkins kick), 5:09. Tied 10–10. **Drive: 6 plays, 77 yards, 2:57.**
- SF – Charlie Garner 20-yard pass from Jeff Garcia (Wade Richey kick), 2:14. 49ers 17–10. **Drive: 5 plays, 74 yards, 2:55.**
- STL – Isaac Bruce 78-yard pass from Kurt Warner (Jeff Wilkins kick), 1:53. Tied 17–17. **Drive: 1 play, 78 yards, 0:21.**

**Third quarter**

- STL – Marshall Faulk 1-yard run (Jeff Wilkins kick), 8:28. Rams 24–17. **Drive: 9 plays, 60 yards, 5:03.**

**Fourth quarter**

- STL – Jeff Wilkins 25-yard field goal, 14:57. Rams 27–17. **Drive: 9 plays, 85 yards, 4:54.**
- SF – Terrell Owens 12-yard pass from Jeff Garcia (Wade Richey kick), 12:02. Rams 27–24. **Drive: 8 plays, 80 yards, 2:55.**
- STL – Marshall Faulk 4-yard run (Jeff Wilkins kick), 7:39. Rams 34–24. **Drive: 7 plays, 80 yards, 4:23.**
- STL – Marshall Faulk 1-yard run (Jeff Wilkins kick), 1:42. Rams 41–24. **Drive: 11 plays, 78 yards, 4:45.**

Top passers

- SF – Jeff Garcia – 21/34, 290 yards, 3 TD, 2 INT
- STL – Kurt Warner – 23/34, 394 yards, 2 TD, 2 INT

Top rushers

- SF – Charlie Garner – 15 rushes, 87 yards
- STL – Marshall Faulk – 25 rushes, 134 yards, 3 TD

Top receivers

- SF – Terrell Owens – 6 receptions, 108 yards, TD
- STL – Isaac Bruce – 8 receptions, 188 yards, TD

==== Week 4: at Atlanta Falcons ====
Week 4: St. Louis Rams at Atlanta Falcons – Game summary

Quarter	1	2	3	4	Total
**Rams**	3	14	10	14	**41**
Falcons	7	6	0	7	**20**

at Georgia Dome, Atlanta, Georgia

- Date: September 24
- Game time: 1:00 p.m. EDT/12:00 p.m. CDT
- Game weather: indoors (dome)
- Game attendance: 58,761
- Referee: Bill Carollo
- TV announcers (Fox): Pat Summerall, John Madden and D. J. Johnson
- Recap, Game Book

Game information

**First quarter**

- ATL – Jamal Anderson 3-yard run (Morten Andersen kick), 10:52. Falcons 7–0. **Drive: 5 plays, 20 yards, 2:54.**
- STL – Jeff Wilkins 30-yard field goal, 6:33. Falcons 7–3. **Drive: 6 plays, 20 yards, 3:02.**

**Second quarter**

- STL – Isaac Bruce 14-yard pass from Kurt Warner (Jeff Wilkins kick), 13:14. Rams 10–7. **Drive: 8 plays, 62 yards, 4:45.**
- ATL – Morten Andersen 37-yard field goal, 2:37. Tied 10–10. **Drive: 10 plays, 67 yards, 5:55.**
- STL – Torry Holt 80-yard pass from Kurt Warner (Jeff Wilkins kick), 2:14. Rams 17–10. **Drive: 2 plays, 80 yards, 0:23.**
- ATL – Morten Andersen 45-yard field goal, 0:00. Rams 17–13. **Drive: 10 plays, 53 yards, 2:14.**

**Third quarter**

- STL – Keith Lyle 94-yard fumble return (Jeff Wilkins kick), 11:58. Rams 24–13.
- STL – Jeff Wilkins 30-yard field goal, 9:33. Rams 27–13. **Drive: 4 plays, 9 yards, 2:11.**

**Fourth quarter**

- STL – Torry Holt 85-yard pass from Kurt Warner (Jeff Wilkins kick), 11:55. Rams 34–13. **Drive: 3 plays, 88 yards, 0:55.**
- ATL – Reggie Kelly 37-yard pass from Chris Chandler (Morten Andersen kick), 9:36. Rams 34–20. **Drive: 4 plays, 80 yards, 2:19.**
- STL – Isaac Bruce 66-yard pass from Kurt Warner (Jeff Wilkins kick), 9:15. Rams 41–20. **Drive: 1 play, 66 yards, 0:21.**

Top passers

- STL – Kurt Warner – 12/19, 336 yards, 4 TD, INT
- ATL – Chris Chandler – 21/35, 255 yards, TD, 2 INT

Top rushers

- STL – Marshall Faulk – 20 rushes, 78 yards
- ATL – Jamal Anderson – 14 rushes, 41 yards, TD

Top receivers

- STL – Torry Holt – 3 receptions, 189 yards, 2 TD
- ATL – Terance Mathis – 8 receptions, 82 yards

==== Week 5: vs. San Diego Chargers ====
Week 5: San Diego Chargers at St. Louis Rams – Game summary

Quarter	1	2	3	4	Total
Chargers	3	7	7	14	**31**
**Rams**	17	13	17	10	**57**

at Trans World Dome, St. Louis, Missouri

- Date: October 1
- Game time: 12:00 p.m. CDT
- Game weather: indoors (dome)
- Game attendance: 66,010
- Referee: Bob McElwee
- TV announcers (CBS): Dick Enberg, Dan Dierdorf and Bonnie Bernstein
- Recap, Game Book

Game information

**First quarter**

- STL – Jeff Wilkins 51-yard field goal, 12:28. Rams 3–0. **Drive: 6 plays, 42 yards, 2:32.**
- STL – Isaac Bruce 9-yard pass from Kurt Warner (Jeff Wilkins kick), 6:38. Rams 10–0. **Drive: 5 plays, 71 yards, 2:25.**
- STL – Marshall Faulk 13-yard pass from Kurt Warner (Jeff Wilkins kick), 5:44. Rams 17–0. **Drive: 2 plays, 25 yards, 0:38.**
- SD – John Carney 37-yard field goal, 0:40. Rams 17–3. **Drive: 10 plays, 49 yards, 5:04.**

**Second quarter**

- STL – Jeff Wilkins 21-yard field goal, 11:59. Rams 20–3. **Drive: 8 plays, 71 yards, 3:41.**
- SD – Jermaine Fazande 2-yard run (John Carney kick), 6:35. Rams 20–10. **Drive: 10 plays, 72 yards, 5:24.**
- STL – Torry Holt 7-yard pass from Kurt Warner (Jeff Wilkins kick), 2:41. Rams 27–10. **Drive: 8 plays, 83 yards, 3:54.**
- STL – Jeff Wilkins 31-yard field goal, 0:00. Rams 30–10. **Drive: 7 plays, 48 yards, 0:53.**

**Third quarter**

- SD – Fred McCrary 3-yard pass from Jim Harbaugh (John Carney kick), 12:00. Rams 30–17. **Drive: 6 plays, 82 yards, 3:00.**
- STL – Isaac Bruce 12-yard pass from Kurt Warner (Jeff Wilkins kick), 10:57. Rams 37–17. **Drive: 2 plays, 63 yards, 1:03.**
- STL – Jeff Wilkins 33-yard field goal, 8:15. Rams 40–17. **Drive: 5 plays, 33 yards, 1:30.**
- STL – Marshall Faulk 48-yard pass from Trent Green (Jeff Wilkins kick), 4:00. Rams 47–17. **Drive: 4 plays, 65 yards, 1:37.**

**Fourth quarter**

- STL – Jeff Wilkins 20-yard field goal, 11:36. Rams 50–17. **Drive: 10 plays, 37 yards, 5:57.**
- SD – Terrell Fletcher 6-yard run (John Carney kick), 7:42. Rams 50–24. **Drive: 9 plays, 77 yards, 3:54.**
- STL – Justin Watson 12-yard run (Jeff Wilkins kick), 3:19. Rams 57–24. **Drive: 7 plays, 80 yards, 4:23.**
- SD – Trevor Gaylor 62-yard pass from Jim Harbaugh (John Carney kick), 1:52. Rams 57–31. **Drive: 3 plays, 71 yards, 1:27.**

Top passers

- SD – Jim Harbaugh – 27/40, 348 yards, 2 TD, INT
- STL – Kurt Warner – 24/30, 390 yards, 4 TD

Top rushers

- SD – Jermaine Fazande – 8 rushes, 19 yards, TD
- STL – Justin Watson – 14 rushes, 102 yards, TD

Top receivers

- SD – Jeff Graham – 7 receptions, 107 yards
- STL – Isaac Bruce – 9 receptions, 167 yards, 2 TD

The Rams opened their offense with Kurt Warner throwing 14 consecutive passes.

==== Week 7: vs. Atlanta Falcons ====
Week 7: Atlanta Falcons at St. Louis Rams – Game summary

Quarter	1	2	3	4	Total
Falcons	14	7	0	8	**29**
**Rams**	7	22	8	8	**45**

at Trans World Dome, St. Louis, Missouri

- Date: October 15
- Game time: 12:00 p.m. CDT
- Game weather: indoors (dome)
- Game attendance: 66,019
- Referee: Jeff Triplette
- TV announcers (Fox): Sam Rosen, Bill Maas and Pete Peterson
- Recap, Game Book

Game information

**First quarter**

- ATL - Darrick Vaughn 96-yard kickoff return (Morten Andersen kick), 14:44. Falcons 7–0.
- STL - Tony Horne 103-yard kickoff return (Jeff Wilkins kick), 14:24. Tied 7–7.
- ATL – Terance Mathis 16-yard pass from Chris Chandler (Morten Andersen kick), 10:14. Falcons 14–7. **Drive: 8 plays, 64 yards, 4:10.**

**Second quarter**

- STL – Tony Horne 3-yard pass from Kurt Warner (Keith Lyle–London Fletcher pass), 14:55. Rams 15–14. **Drive: 12 plays, 95 yards, 6:47.**
- STL – Justin Watson 2-yard run (run failed), 3:16. Rams 21–14. **Drive: 12 plays, 97 yards, 6:29.**
- ATL – Jamal Anderson 4-yard run (Morten Andersen kick), 1:56. Tied 21–21. **Drive: 3 plays, 65 yards, 1:20.**
- STL – Az-Zahir Hakim 20-yard pass from Kurt Warner (Marshall Faulk run), 0:03. Rams 29–21. **Drive: 10 plays, 75 yards, 1:53.**

**Third quarter**

- STL – Robert Holcombe 12-yard pass from Kurt Warner (Marshall Faulk run), 6:57. Rams 37–21. **Drive: 6 plays, 59 yards, 3:35.**

**Fourth quarter**

- ATL – Tim Dwight 16-yard pass from Chris Chandler (Jamal Anderson run), 4:27. Rams 37–29. **Drive: 8 plays, 49 yards, 1:43.**
- STL – Marshall Faulk 3-yard run (Kurt Warner–Roland Williams pass), 1:09. Rams 45–29. **Drive: 8 plays, 79 yards, 3:18.**

Top passers

- ATL – Chris Chandler – 18/30, 220 yards, 2 TD, INT
- STL – Kurt Warner – 24/40, 313 yards, 3 TD, INT

Top rushers

- ATL – Jamal Anderson – 14 rushes, 64 yards, TD
- STL – Marshall Faulk – 25 rushes, 208 yards, TD

Top receivers

- ATL – Jamal Anderson – 4 receptions, 67 yards
- STL – Marshall Faulk – 7 receptions, 78 yards

==== Week 8: at Kansas City Chiefs ====
Week 8: St. Louis Rams at Kansas City Chiefs – Game summary

Quarter	1	2	3	4	Total
Rams	0	14	14	6	**34**
**Chiefs**	20	7	13	14	**54**

at Arrowhead Stadium, Kansas City, Missouri

- Date: October 22
- Game time: 12:00 p.m. CDT
- Game weather: Overcast, 64 °F (18 °C)
- Game attendance: 79,142
- Referee: Mike Carey
- TV announcers (Fox): Dick Stockton, Matt Millen and Pam Oliver
- Recap, Game Book

Game information

**First quarter**

- KC – Frank Moreau 2-yard run (Todd Peterson kick), 13:04. Chiefs 7–0. **Drive: 4 plays, 25 yards, 1:33.**
- KC – Todd Peterson 34-yard field goal, 9:09. Chiefs 10–0. **Drive: 5 plays, 33 yards, 2:03.**
- KC – Todd Peterson 20-yard field goal, 4:33. Chiefs 13–0. **Drive: 5 plays, 33 yards, 1:41.**
- KC – Mike Cloud 6-yard return of blocked punt (Todd Peterson kick), 2:56. Chiefs 20–0.

**Second quarter**

- STL – Marshall Faulk 1-yard run (Pete Stoyanovich kick), 9:43. Chiefs 20–7. **Drive: 14 plays, 80 yards, 8:13.**
- KC – Tony Gonzalez 9-yard pass from Elvis Grbac (Todd Peterson kick), 6:49. Chiefs 27–7. **Drive: 5 plays, 71 yards, 2:54.**
- STL – Torry Holt 18-yard pass from Kurt Warner (Pete Stoyanovich kick), 5:15. Chiefs 27–14. **Drive: 3 plays, 52 yards, 1:34.**

**Third quarter**

- KC – Derrick Alexander 30-yard pass from Elvis Grbac (Todd Peterson kick), 13:30. Chiefs 34–14. **Drive: 3 plays, 65 yards, 1:30.**
- STL – Roland Williams 31-yard pass from Trent Green (Pete Stoyanovich kick), 8:50. Chiefs 34–21. **Drive: 8 plays, 87 yards, 4:40.**
- KC – Kimble Anders 6-yard run (pass failed), 1:26. Chiefs 40–21. **Drive: 6 plays, 52 yards, 1:29.**
- STL – Isaac Bruce 22-yard pass from Trent Green (Pete Stoyanovich kick), 0:18. Chiefs 40–28. **Drive: 3 plays, 34 yards, 1:08.**

**Fourth quarter**

- KC – Kimble Anders 4-yard run (Todd Peterson kick), 10:51. Chiefs 47–28. **Drive: 5 plays, 77 yards, 2:47.**
- KC – Troy Drayton 8-yard pass from Warren Moon (Todd Peterson kick), 5:27. Chiefs 54–28. **Drive: 5 plays, 80 yards, 3:03.**
- STL – Isaac Bruce 4-yard pass from Trent Green (pass failed), 2:53. Chiefs 54–34. **Drive: 7 plays, 51 yards, 2:34.**

**Top passers**

- STL – Trent Green – 15/21, 205 yards, 3 TD, INT
- KC – Elvis Grbac – 18/30, 266 yards, 2 TD

**Top rushers**

- STL – Marshall Faulk – 17 rushes, 67 yards, TD
- KC – Kimble Anders – 13 rushes, 102 yards, 2 TD

**Top receivers**

- STL – Isaac Bruce – 8 receptions, 129 yards, 2 TD
- KC – Derrick Alexander – 5 receptions, 117 yards, TD

==== Week 9: at San Francisco 49ers ====
Week 9: St. Louis Rams at San Francisco 49ers – Game summary

Quarter	1	2	3	4	Total
**Rams**	7	7	10	10	**34**
49ers	7	10	7	0	**24**

at 3Com Park, San Francisco, California

- Date: October 29
- Game time: 3:00 p.m. CST/1:00 p.m. PST
- Game weather: Mostly cloudy, 60 °F (15.6 °C)
- Game attendance: 68,109
- Referee: Ed Hochuli
- TV announcers (Fox): Dick Stockton, Matt Millen and Pam Oliver
- Recap, Game Book

Game information

**First quarter**

- SF – Charlie Garner 4-yard run (Wade Richey kick), 13:25. 49ers 7–0. **Drive: 3 plays, 20 yards, 1:35.**
- STL – Marshall Faulk 1-yard run (Pete Stoyanovich kick), 3:59. Tied 7–7. **Drive: 7 plays, 59 yards, 3:03.**

**Second quarter**

- SF – Wade Richey 44-yard field goal, 13:01. 49ers 10–7. **Drive: 7 plays, 12 yards, 3:28.**
- STL – Marshall Faulk 1-yard run (Pete Stoyanovich kick), 2:54. Rams 14–10. **Drive: 5 plays, 32 yards, 3:21.**
- SF – Terrell Owens 53-yard pass from Jeff Garcia (Wade Richey kick), 1:44. 49ers 17–14. **Drive: 4 plays, 66 yards, 1:10.**

**Third quarter**

- STL – Pete Stoyanovich 48-yard field goal, 12:50. Tied 17–17. **Drive: 7 plays, 39 yards, 2:10.**
- SF – Terrell Owens 17-yard pass from Jeff Garcia (Wade Richey kick), 8:10. 49ers 24–17. **Drive: 10 plays, 68 yards, 4:40.**
- STL – Marshall Faulk 19-yard pass from Trent Green (Pete Stoyanovich kick), 3:38. Tied 24–24. **Drive: 8 plays, 78 yards, 4:32.**

**Fourth quarter**

- STL – Marshall Faulk 16-yard pass from Trent Green (Pete Stoyanovich kick), 10:21. Rams 31–24. **Drive: 4 plays, 31 yards, 1:37.**
- STL – Pete Stoyanovich 46-yard field goal, 3:45. Rams 34–24. **Drive: 9 plays, 59 yards, 4:21.**

Top passers

- STL – Trent Green – 22/39, 310 yards, 2 TD, INT
- SF – Jeff Garcia – 26/44, 243 yards, 2 TD

Top rushers

- STL – Marshall Faulk – 19 rushes, 83 yards, 2 TD
- SF – Charlie Garner – 10 rushes, 28 yards, TD

Top receivers

- STL – Isaac Bruce – 8 receptions, 129 yards
- SF – Terrell Owens – 8 receptions, 115 yards, 2 TD

==== Week 10: vs. Carolina Panthers ====
Week 10: Carolina Panthers at St. Louis Rams – Game summary

Quarter	1	2	3	4	Total
**Panthers**	6	7	3	11	**27**
Rams	7	3	14	0	**24**

at Trans World Dome, St. Louis, Missouri

- Date: November 5
- Game time: 7:30 p.m. CST
- Game weather: indoors (dome)
- Game attendance: 66,048
- Referee: Bob McElwee
- TV announcers (KDNL/ESPN): Mike Patrick, Joe Theismann, Paul Maguire and Solomon Wilcots
- Recap, Game Book

Game information

**First quarter**

- CAR – Joe Nedney 35-yard field goal, 10:59. Panthers 3–0. **Drive: 7 plays, 24 yards, 2:23.**
- STL – Az-Zahir Hakim 14-yard pass from Trent Green (Pete Stoyanovich kick), 4:25. Rams 7–3. **Drive: 8 plays, 79 yards, 4:06.**
- CAR – Joe Nedney 45-yard field goal, 0:11. Rams 7–6. **Drive: 7 plays, 32 yards, 4:14.**

**Second quarter**

- STL – Pete Stoyanovich 28-yard field goal, 10:38. Rams 10–6. **Drive: 8 plays, 81 yards, 4:33.**
- CAR – Casey Crawford 16-yard pass from Steve Beuerlein (Joe Nedney kick), 5:55. Panthers 13–10. **Drive: 5 plays, 60 yards, 3:13.**

**Third quarter**

- CAR – Joe Nedney 24-yard field goal, 9:53. Panthers 16–10. **Drive: 10 plays, 62 yards, 5:07.**
- STL – Isaac Bruce 4-yard pass from Trent Green (Pete Stoyanovich kick), 5:19. Rams 17–16. **Drive: 9 plays, 75 yards, 4:34.**
- STL – Justin Watson 3-yard run (Pete Stoyanovich kick), 2:26. Rams 24–16. **Drive: 5 plays, 32 yards, 2:37.**

**Fourth quarter**

- CAR – Donald Hayes 13-yard pass from Steve Beuerlein (Steve Beuerlein run), 10:43. Tied 24–24. **Drive: 2 plays, 26 yards, 0:10.**
- CAR – Joe Nedney 46-yard field goal, 0:40. Panthers 27–24. **Drive: 13 plays, 45 yards, 5:51.**

Top passers

- CAR – Steve Beuerlein – 15/25, 214 yards, 2 TD, INT
- STL – Trent Green – 29/42, 431 yards, 2 TD

Top rushers

- CAR – Tim Biakabutuka – 19 rushes, 77 yards
- STL – Justin Watson – 12 rushes, 12 yards, TD

Top receivers

- CAR – Muhsin Muhammad – 6 receptions, 83 yards
- STL – Az-Zahir Hakim – 8 receptions, 147 yards, TD

==== Week 11: at New York Giants ====
Week 11: St. Louis Rams at New York Giants – Game summary

Quarter	1	2	3	4	Total
**Rams**	14	14	10	0	**38**
Giants	0	7	10	7	**24**

at Giants Stadium, East Rutherford, New Jersey

- Date: November 12
- Game time: 4:15 p.m. EST/3:15 p.m. CST
- Game weather: Partly Sunny, 54 °F (12.2 °C)
- Game attendance: 78,174
- Referee: Bernie Kukar
- TV announcers (Fox): Pat Summerall, John Madden and D. J. Johnson
- Recap, Game Book

Game information

**First quarter**

- STL – Roland Williams 1-yard pass from Trent Green (Jeff Wilkins kick), 10:33. Rams 7–0. **Drive: 1 play, 1 yard, 0:05.**
- STL – Torry Holt 5-yard pass from Trent Green (Jeff Hall kick), 1:55. Rams 14–0. **Drive: 3 plays, 27 yards, 1:27.**

**Second quarter**

- NYG – Tiki Barber 13-yard pass from Kerry Collins (Brad Daluiso kick), 12:42. Rams 14–7. **Drive: 3 plays, 66 yards, 1:19.**
- STL – Ricky Proehl 8-yard pass from Trent Green (Jeff Hall kick), 5:43. Rams 21–7. **Drive: 12 plays, 71 yards, 6:59.**
- STL – Trent Green 18-yard run (Jeff Hall kick), 2:41. Rams 28–7. **Drive: 5 plays, 63 yards, 2:05.**

**Third quarter**

- NYG – Ike Hilliard 46-yard pass from Kerry Collins (Brad Daluiso kick), 13:58. Rams 28–14. **Drive: 3 plays, 47 yards, 1:02.**
- NYG – Brad Daluiso 20-yard field goal, 11:34. Rams 28–17. **Drive: 4 plays, 8 yards, 2:07.**
- STL – Jeff Hall 50-yard field goal, 7:20. Rams 31–17. **Drive: 9 plays, 41 yards, 4:14.**
- STL – Isaac Bruce 34-yard pass from Trent Green (Jeff Hall kick), 2:24. Rams 38–17. **Drive: 4 plays, 59 yards, 1:39.**

**Fourth quarter**

- NYG – Ike Hilliard 34-yard pass from Kerry Collins (Brad Daluiso kick), 8:26. Rams 38–24. **Drive: 8 plays, 92 yards, 2:16.**

Top passers

- STL – Trent Green – 27/45, 272 yards, 4 TD, INT
- NYG – Kerry Collins – 17/34, 240 yards, 3 TD, 2 INT

Top rushers

- STL – Justin Watson – 17 rushes, 62 yards
- NYG – Ron Dayne – 9 rushes, 66 yards

Top receivers

- STL – Torry Holt – 8 receptions, 86 yards, TD
- NYG – Ike Hilliard – 5 receptions, 110 yards, 2 TD

==== Week 12: vs. Washington Redskins ====
Week 12: Washington Redskins at St. Louis Rams – Game summary

Quarter	1	2	3	4	Total
**Redskins**	3	10	12	8	**33**
Rams	10	3	7	0	**20**

at Trans World Dome, St. Louis, Missouri

- Date: November 20
- Game time: 8:00 p.m. CST
- Game weather: indoors (dome)
- Game attendance: 66,087
- Referee: Ron Blum
- TV announcers (ABC): Al Michaels, Dan Fouts, Dennis Miller, Melissa Stark and Eric Dickerson
- Recap, Game Book

Game information

**First quarter**

- STL – Jeff Hall 30-yard field goal, 10:21. Rams 3–0. **Drive: 11 plays, 47 yards, 4:39.**
- STL – Marshall Faulk 19-yard pass from Trent Green (Jeff Hall kick), 9:35. Rams 10–0. **Drive: 1 play, 24 yards, 0:07.**
- WSH – Eddie Murray 37-yard field goal, 0:43. Rams 10–3. **Drive: 8 plays, 44 yards, 4:26.**

**Second quarter**

- STL – Jeff Hall 43-yard field goal, 6:45. Rams 13–3. **Drive: 14 plays, 60 yards, 8:58.**
- WSH – James Thrash 19-yard pass from Jeff George (Eddie Murray kick), 3:50. Rams 13–10. **Drive: 11 plays, 70 yards, 4:55.**
- WSH – Eddie Murray 47-yard field goal, 0:00. Tied 13–13. **Drive: 6 plays, 47 yards, 1:31.**

**Third quarter**

- WSH – Larry Centers 3-yard pass from Jeff George (kick failed, hit left upright), 9:19. Redskins 19–13. **Drive: 11 plays, 58 yards, 5:41.**
- STL – Ricky Proehl 15-yard pass from Trent Green (Jeff Hall kick), 5:13. Rams 20–19. **Drive: 8 plays, 79 yards, 4:06.**
- WSH – Irving Fryar 34-yard pass from Jeff George (pass failed), 0:25. Redskins 25–20. **Drive: 4 plays, 44 yards, 1:48.**

**Fourth quarter**

- WSH – Eddie Murray 41-yard field goal, 11:43. Redskins 28–20. **Drive: 7 plays, 36 yards, 3:42.**
- WSH – Eddie Murray 39-yard field goal, 10:38. Redskins 31–20. **Drive: 4 plays, 3 yards, 0:52.**
- WSH – Trent Green sacked in the end zone by Bruce Smith for a safety, 3:44. Redskins 33–20.

Top passers

- WSH – Jeff George – 24/34, 269 yards, 3 TD, INT
- STL – Trent Green – 23/38, 366 yards, 2 TD, INT

Top rushers

- WSH – Stephen Davis – 19 rushes, 85 yards
- STL – Marshall Faulk – 9 rushes, 33 yards

Top receivers

- WSH – Albert Connell – 5 receptions, 96 yards
- STL – Marshall Faulk – 9 receptions, 88 yards, TD

==== Week 13: vs. New Orleans Saints ====
Week 13: New Orleans Saints at St. Louis Rams – Game summary

Quarter	1	2	3	4	Total
**Saints**	7	14	3	7	**31**
Rams	7	3	7	7	**24**

at Trans World Dome, St. Louis, Missouri

- Date: November 26
- Game time: 12:00 p.m. CST
- Game weather: indoors (dome)
- Game attendance: 66,064
- Referee: Gerry Austin
- TV announcers (Fox): Pat Summerall, John Madden and D. J. Johnson
- Recap, Game Book

Game information

**First quarter**

- STL – Robert Holcombe 1-yard run (Jeff Hall kick), 2:43. Rams 7–0. **Drive: 4 plays, 46 yards, 1:49.**
- NO – Brian Milne 4-yard pass from Aaron Brooks (Doug Brien kick), 0:08. Tied 7–7. **Drive: 3 plays, 19 yards, 1:24.**

**Second quarter**

- NO – Jerald Moore 3-yard run (Doug Brien kick), 10:28. Saints 14–7. **Drive: 6 plays, 46 yards, 3:09.**
- NO – Aaron Brooks 2-yard run (Doug Brien kick), 1:55. Saints 21–7. **Drive: 11 plays, 80 yards, 5:24.**
- STL – Jeff Hall 28-yard field goal, 0:00. Saints 21–10. **Drive: 10 plays, 74 yards, 1:55.**

**Third quarter**

- NO – Doug Brien 30-yard field goal, 9:27. Saints 24–10. **Drive: 10 plays, 44 yards, 5:33.**
- STL – Az-Zahir Hakim 35-yard pass from Trent Green (Jeff Hall kick), 6:50. Saints 24–17. **Drive: 7 plays, 73 yards, 2:37.**

**Fourth quarter**

- STL – Ricky Proehl 19-yard pass from Trent Green (Jeff Hall kick), 11:06. Tied 24–24. **Drive: 5 plays, 21 yards, 2:59.**
- NO – Aaron Brooks 1-yard run (Doug Brien kick), 3:50. Saints 31–24. **Drive: 11 plays, 85 yards, 7:16.**

Top passers

- NO – Aaron Brooks – 17/29, 190 yards, TD, 2 INT
- STL – Trent Green – 20/41, 289 yards, 2 TD, INT

Top rushers

- NO – Jerald Moore – 18 rushes, 61 yards, TD
- STL – Marshall Faulk – 8 rushes, 27 yards

Top receivers

- NO – Joe Horn – 7 receptions, 77 yards
- STL – Torry Holt – 6 receptions, 89 yards

==== Week 14: at Carolina Panthers ====
Week 14: St. Louis Rams at Carolina Panthers – Game summary

Quarter	1	2	3	4	Total
Rams	3	0	0	0	**3**
**Panthers**	0	0	7	9	**16**

at Ericsson Stadium, Charlotte, North Carolina

- Date: December 3
- Game time: 1:00 p.m. EST/12:00 p.m. CST
- Game weather: Cloudy skies, 34 °F (1.1 °C)
- Game attendance: 73,358
- Referee: Tony Corrente
- TV announcers (Fox): Dick Stockton, Matt Millen and Pam Oliver
- Recap, Game Book

Game information

**First quarter**

- STL – Jeff Wilkins 38-yard field goal, 9:59. Rams 3–0. **Drive: 11 plays, 57 yards, 5:01.**

**Second quarter**

- No scoring plays

**Third quarter**

- CAR – Jimmy Hitchcock 88-yard interception return (Joe Nedney kick), 5:19. Panthers 7–3.

**Fourth quarter**

- CAR – Joe Nedney 20-yard field goal, 10:18. Panthers 10–3. **Drive: 14 plays, 69 yards, 8:29.**
- CAR – Joe Nedney 23-yard field goal, 4:13. Panthers 13–3. **Drive: 10 plays, 33 yards, 5:49.**
- CAR – Joe Nedney 37-yard field goal, 1:57. Panthers 16–3. **Drive: 4 plays, 5 yards, 1:02.**

Top passers

- STL – Kurt Warner – 18/36, 189 yards, 4 INT
- CAR – Steve Beuerlein – 20/30, 195 yards, 2 INT

Top rushers

- STL – Marshall Faulk – 15 rushes, 94 yards
- CAR – Brad Hoover – 22 rushes, 63 yards

Top receivers

- STL – Isaac Bruce – 6 receptions, 74 yards
- CAR – Muhsin Muhammad – 10 receptions, 95 yards

==== Week 15: vs. Minnesota Vikings ====
Week 15: Minnesota Vikings at St. Louis Rams – Game summary

Quarter	1	2	3	4	Total
Vikings	0	7	14	8	**29**
**Rams**	14	6	13	7	**40**

at Trans World Dome, St. Louis, Missouri

- Date: December 10
- Game time: 3:15 p.m. CST
- Game weather: indoors (dome)
- Game attendance: 66,273
- Referee: Ron Winter
- TV announcers (Fox): Pat Summerall, John Madden and D. J. Johnson
- Recap, Game Book

Game information

**First quarter**

- STL – Marshall Faulk 1-yard run (Jeff Wilkins kick), 8:56. Rams 7–0. **Drive: 10 plays, 80 yards, 6:04.**
- STL – Marshall Faulk 1-yard run (Jeff Wilkins kick), 4:54. Rams 14–0. **Drive: 4 plays, 39 yards, 2:03.**

**Second quarter**

- STL – Jeff Wilkins 26-yard field goal, 13:48. Rams 17–0. **Drive: 8 plays, 68 yards, 2:52.**
- MIN – Johnny McWilliams 22-yard pass from Daunte Culpepper (Gary Anderson kick), 7:14. Rams 17–7. **Drive: 10 plays, 80 yards, 6:34.**
- STL – Jeff Wilkins 19-yard field goal, 1:11. Rams 20–7. **Drive: 13 plays, 78 yards, 6:03.**

**Third quarter**

- MIN – Daunte Culpepper 8-yard run (Gary Anderson kick), 11:20. Rams 20–14. **Drive: 8 plays, 62 yards, 3:40.**
- STL – Marshall Faulk 5-yard run (pass failed), 8:19. Rams 26–14. **Drive: 6 plays, 79 yards, 3:01.**
- STL – Marshall Faulk 1-yard run (Jeff Wilkins kick), 4:36. Rams 33–14. **Drive: 6 plays, 73 yards, 2:05.**
- MIN – Cris Carter 2-yard pass from Daunte Culpepper (Gary Anderson kick), 0:32. Rams 33–21. **Drive: 8 plays, 60 yards, 4:04.**

**Fourth quarter**

- STL – Justin Watson 6-yard run (Jeff Wilkins kick), 8:10. Rams 40–21. **Drive: 12 plays, 80 yards, 7:22.**
- MIN – Randy Moss 32-yard pass from Daunte Culpepper (Daunte Culpepper–Randy Moss pass), 2:27. Rams 40–29. **Drive: 8 plays, 86 yards, 1:50.**

Top passers

- MIN – Daunte Culpepper – 21/33, 221 yards, 3 TD
- STL – Kurt Warner – 27/32, 346 yards

Top rushers

- MIN – Robert Smith – 15 rushes, 67 yards
- STL – Marshall Faulk – 25 rushes, 135 yards, 4 TD

Top receivers

- MIN – Cris Carter – 7 receptions, 66 yards, TD
- STL – Torry Holt – 9 receptions, 172 yards

==== Week 16: at Tampa Bay Buccaneers ====
Week 16: St. Louis Rams at Tampa Bay Buccaneers – Game summary

Quarter	1	2	3	4	Total
Rams	7	7	7	14	**35**
**Buccaneers**	10	14	7	7	**38**

at Raymond James Stadium, Tampa, Florida

- Date: December 18
- Game time: 9:00 p.m. EST/8:00 p.m. CST
- Game weather: Cold, light breeze, clear 49 °F (9.4 °C)
- Game attendance: 65,653
- Referee: Johnny Grier
- TV announcers (ABC): Al Michaels, Dan Fouts, Dennis Miller, Melissa Stark and Eric Dickerson
- Recap, Game Book

Game information

**First quarter**

- TB – Martín Gramatica 35-yard field goal, 13:08. Buccaneers 3–0. **Drive: 4 plays, 3 yards, 0:53.**
- STL – Marshall Faulk 2-yard run (Jeff Wilkins kick), 6:25. Rams 7–3. **Drive: 9 plays, 76 yards, 4:41.**
- TB – Warrick Dunn 2-yard run (Martín Gramatica kick), 0:40. Buccaneers 10–7. **Drive: 9 plays, 82 yards, 5:45.**

**Second quarter**

- STL – Marshall Faulk 16-yard run (Jeff Wilkins kick), 11:00. Rams 14–10. **Drive: 9 plays, 72 yards, 4:40.**
- TB – Keyshawn Johnson 8-yard pass from Shaun King (Martín Gramatica kick), 4:02. Buccaneers 17–14. **Drive: 12 plays, 69 yards, 6:58.**
- TB – Keyshawn Johnson 17-yard pass from Shaun King (Martín Gramatica kick), 1:00. Buccaneers 24–14. **Drive: 6 plays, 58 yards, 1:49.**

**Third quarter**

- STL – Marshall Faulk 27-yard pass from Kurt Warner (Jeff Wilkins kick), 0:20. Buccaneers 24–21. **Drive: 7 plays, 63 yards, 3:40.**
- TB – Warrick Dunn 52-yard run (Martín Gramatica kick), 0:00. Buccaneers 31–21. **Drive: 1 play, 52 yards, 0:20.**

**Fourth quarter**

- STL – Marshall Faulk 9-yard run (Jeff Wilkins kick), 10:53. Buccaneers 31–28. **Drive: 7 plays, 73 yards, 4:07.**
- STL – Torry Holt 72-yard pass from Kurt Warner (Jeff Wilkins kick), 5:18. Rams 35–31. **Drive: 2 plays, 80 yards, 0:55.**
- TB – Warrick Dunn 1-yard run (Martín Gramatica kick), 0:48. Buccaneers 38–35. **Drive: 13 plays, 80 yards, 1:34.**

Top passers

- STL – Kurt Warner – 20/32, 316 yards, 2 TD, 3 INT
- TB – Shaun King – 18/38, 256 yards, 2 TD, 2 INT

Top rushers

- STL – Marshall Faulk – 22 rushes, 79 yards, 3 TD
- TB – Warrick Dunn – 22 rushes, 145 yards, 3 TD

Top receivers

- STL – Torry Holt – 9 receptions, 165 yards, TD
- TB – Keyshawn Johnson – 7 receptions, 116 yards, 2 TD

==== Week 17: at New Orleans Saints ====
Week 17: St. Louis Rams at New Orleans Saints – Game summary

Quarter	1	2	3	4	Total
**Rams**	7	3	9	7	**26**
Saints	0	7	0	14	**21**

at Louisiana Superdome, New Orleans, Louisiana

- Date: December 24
- Game time: 12:00 p.m. CST
- Game weather: indoors (dome)
- Game attendance: 64,900
- Referee: Phil Luckett
- TV announcers (Fox): Dick Stockton, Matt Millen and Pam Oliver
- Recap, Game Book

Game information

**First quarter**

- STL – Marshall Faulk 13-yard pass from Kurt Warner (Jeff Wilkins kick), 9:15. Rams 7–0. **Drive: 5 plays, 36 yards, 2:45.**

**Second quarter**

- NO - Darrin Smith 41-yard interception return (Doug Brien kick), 10:29, Tied 7-7.
- STL – Jeff Wilkins 19-yard field goal, 1:18. Rams 10–7. **Drive: 15 plays, 82 yards, 9:11.**

**Third quarter**

- STL – Jeff Wilkins 39-yard field goal, 11:41. Rams 13–7. **Drive: 7 plays, 56 yards, 3:19.**
- STL – Marshall Faulk 9-yard run (run failed), 2:45. Rams 19–7. **Drive: 9 plays, 75 yards, 4:16.**

**Fourth quarter**

- NO – Willie Jackson 28-yard pass from Aaron Brooks (Doug Brien kick), 9:21. Rams 19–14. **Drive: 6 plays, 94 yards, 2:15.**
- STL – Marshall Faulk 1-yard run (Jeff Wilkins kick), 3:27. Rams 26–14. **Drive: 9 plays, 79 yards, 5:54.**
- NO – Joe Horn 22-yard pass from Aaron Brooks (Doug Brien kick), 2:24. Rams 26–21. **Drive: 6 plays, 60 yards, 1:23.**

Top passers

- STL – Kurt Warner – 12/17, 133 yards, TD, INT
- NO – Aaron Brooks – 16/31, 208 yards, 2 TD, INT

Top rushers

- STL – Marshall Faulk – 32 rushes, 220 yards, 2 TD
- NO – Jerald Moore – 4 rushes, 45 yards

Top receivers

- STL – Torry Holt – 5 receptions, 121 yards
- NO – Joe Horn – 5 receptions, 60 yards, TD

=== Standings ===
NFC West
	W	L	T	PCT	PF	PA	STK
^{(3)} New Orleans Saints	10	6	0	.625	354	305	L1
^{(6)} St. Louis Rams	10	6	0	.625	540	471	W1
Carolina Panthers	7	9	0	.438	310	310	L1
San Francisco 49ers	6	10	0	.375	388	422	L1
Atlanta Falcons	4	12	0	.250	252	413	W1

== Postseason ==
Round	Date	Opponent (seed)	Result	Record	Venue	Recap
Wild Card	December 30	at New Orleans Saints (3)	L 28–31	0–1	Louisiana Superdome	Recap

=== Game summaries ===
==== NFC Wild Card Game: at (3) New Orleans Saints ====
NFC Wild Card Playoffs: (6) St. Louis Rams at (3) New Orleans Saints – Game summary

Quarter	1	2	3	4	Total
Rams	7	0	0	21	28
Saints	0	10	7	14	31

at Louisiana Superdome, New Orleans, Louisiana

- Date: December 30
- Game time: 3:00 p.m. CST
- Game weather: Played indoors, domed stadium
- Game attendance: 64,900
- Referee: Gerry Austin
- TV announcers (ABC): Al Michaels, Dan Fouts, Dennis Miller, Melissa Stark and Eric Dickerson
- Recap, Game Book

Game information

First quarter

- STL – Isaac Bruce 17-yard pass from Kurt Warner (Jeff Wilkins kick), 5:58. Rams 7–0. Drive: 11 plays, 68 yards, 6:55.

Second quarter

- NO – Robert Wilson 12-yard pass from Aaron Brooks (Doug Brien kick), 14:56. Tied 7–7. Drive: 11 plays, 70 yards, 6:02.
- NO – Doug Brien 33-yard field goal, 1:30, Saints 10–7. Drive: 4 plays, 5 yards, 0:51.

Third quarter

- NO – Willie Jackson 10-yard pass from Aaron Brooks (Doug Brien kick), 8:40. Saints 17–7. Drive: 7 plays, 45 yards, 3:23.

Fourth quarter

- NO – Willie Jackson 49-yard pass from Aaron Brooks (Doug Brien kick), 13:22. Saints 24–7. Drive: 5 plays, 74 yards, 2:55.
- NO – Willie Jackson 16-yard pass from Aaron Brooks (Doug Brien kick), 11:57. Saints 31–7. Drive: 1 play, 16 yards, 0:05.
- STL – Ricky Proehl 17-yard pass from Kurt Warner (run failed), 9:36. Saints 31–13. Drive: 4 plays, 80 yards, 2:21.
- STL – Marshall Faulk 25-yard pass from Kurt Warner (Jeff Wilkins kick), 3:52. Saints 31–20. Drive: 3 plays, 62 yards, 0:48.
- STL – Kurt Warner 5-yard run (Kurt Warner–Marshall Faulk pass), 2:36. Saints 31–28. Drive: 5 plays, 47 yards, 1:07.

Top passers

- STL – Kurt Warner – 24/40, 365 yards, 3 TD, 3 INT
- NO – Aaron Brooks – 16/29, 266 yards, 4 TD, INT

Top rushers

- STL – Marshall Faulk – 14 rushes, 24 yards
- NO – Terry Allen – 16 rushes, 21 yards

Top receivers

- STL – Isaac Bruce – 7 receptions, 127 yards, TD
- NO – Willie Jackson – 6 receptions, 142 yards, 3 TD

The Saints won their first playoff game in their 34-year history with quarterback Aaron Brooks' 266 passing yards and four touchdowns, by holding off the defending champion Rams, who scored three touchdowns in the final quarter. Overall, the Rams committed five turnovers while the Saints committed none. Rams quarterback Kurt Warner lost four turnovers (three interceptions and a fumble), while running back Marshall Faulk, who shredded the Saints with 220 rushing yards when they played against them in the regular season, was held to a season low of 24 yards on the ground.

== Best performances ==
- Marshall Faulk, October 15, 208 rushing yards vs. Atlanta Falcons
- Marshall Faulk, December 24, 220 rushing yards vs. New Orleans Saints
- Trent Green, 431 passing yards vs. the Carolina Panthers, (achieved on November 5)
- Kurt Warner, 441 passing yards vs. the Denver Broncos, (achieved on September 4)

== Statistics ==
- Led NFL, average yards per play (7.0)
- NFL record, combined net yards gained (7,075)
- NFL record, passing yards, (5,232)
- Led NFL, first downs, passing (247)
- Led NFL, passes completed (380)
- Led NFL, passing offense
- Led NFL, passing touchdowns (37)
- Led NFL, percentage of passes completed (64.7%)
- Led NFL, rushing touchdowns (26)
- Led NFL, third down efficiency (47.5%)
- Led NFL, total offense
- Led NFL, total touchdowns (67)
- Led NFL, two-point conversions (4, tied)
- Led NFL, yards gained per completed pass (14.5)

== Awards and records ==
- Marshall Faulk, NFL MVP
- Marshall Faulk, Associated Press MVP
- Marshall Faulk, Associated Press All-Pro
- Marshall Faulk, All-NFL Team (as selected by the Associated Press, Pro Football Weekly, and the Pro Football Writers of America)
- Marshall Faulk, Associated Press Most Valuable Player
- Marshall Faulk, Associated Press Offensive Player of the Year
- Marshall Faulk, Daniel F. Reeves Memorial Award
- Marshall Faulk, Football Digest Player of the Year
- Marshall Faulk, college and Pro Football Newsweekly Offensive Player of the Year
- Marshall Faulk, Miller Lite Player of the Year
- Marshall Faulk, NFC Offensive Player of the Week, week 3
- Marshall Faulk, NFC Offensive Player of the Week, week 7
- Marshall Faulk, NFC Offensive Player of the Week, week 17
- Marshall Faulk, NFC Offensive Player of the Month, October
- Marshall Faulk, NFC Offensive Player of the Month, December
- Marshall Faulk, Pro Football Writers of America Most Valuable Player
- Marshall Faulk, Sporting News Player of the Year
- Marshall Faulk, Sports Illustrated Player of the Year
- London Fletcher, NFC Defensive Player of the Week, week 15
- Trent Green, NFC Offensive Player of the Week, week 11
- Trent Green, NFC Passer Rating Leader, (101.8 rating)
- Az-Zahir Hakim, All-NFL Team (as selected by the Associated Press, Pro Football Weekly, and the Pro Football Writers of America)
- Az-Zahir Hakim, NFC Special Teams Player of the Week, week 9
- Az-Zahir Hakim, PFW/PFWA All-Pro Team
- Kurt Warner, NFC Offensive Player of the Week, week 5
- Kurt Warner, NFC Offensive Player of the Month, September
