= 2000 New Orleans Saints season =

NFL team season

- Owner: Tom Benson
- General manager: Randy Mueller
- Head coach: Jim Haslett
- Offensive coordinator: Mike McCarthy
- Defensive coordinator: Ron Zook
- Home stadium: Louisiana Superdome

Results
- Record: 10–6
- Division place: 1st NFC West
- Playoffs: Won Wild Card Playoffs (vs. Rams) 31–28; Lost Divisional Playoffs (at Vikings) 16–34
- Pro Bowlers: T Willie Roaf; WR Joe Horn; DT La'Roi Glover; DE Joe Johnson; LB Keith Mitchell; LB Mark Fields

The 2000 season was the New Orleans Saints' 34th in the National Football League (NFL) and their 25th playing home games at the Louisiana Superdome. The Saints were looking to improve on their 3–13 finish from a year earlier under new head coach Jim Haslett who replaced Mike Ditka. Not only did the Saints do so, but they finished with a 10–6 record to win the NFC West and advanced to the playoffs for the first time since 1992. They also won their first ever playoff game in franchise history by defeating the defending Super Bowl champion St. Louis Rams in the wild-card round. The Saints went no further, though, as they lost to the Minnesota Vikings in the next round.

This was the only time the Saints made the playoffs under Haslett. For the next four seasons, the Saints fell out of contention. They would not return to the playoffs until 2006.

== Offseason ==
Additions	Subtractions
WR Joe Horn (Chiefs)	LB Kevin Mitchell (Redskins)
WR Jake Reed (Vikings)	WR Eddie Kennison (Bears)
CB Kevin Mathis (Cowboys)	DE Brady Smith (Falcons)
S Darren Perry (Ravens)	QB Billy Joe Hobert (Colts)
RB Terry Allen (Patriots)	QB Danny Wuerffel (Packers)
P Toby Gowin (Cowboys)	WR Andre Hastings (Buccaneers)
QB Jeff Blake (Bengals)	CB Ashley Ambrose (Falcons)
CB Fred Thomas (Seahawks)	RB Lamar Smith (Dolphins)
LB Darrin Smith (Seahawks)	LB Chris Bordano (Cowboys)
CB Steve Israel (Patriots)	P Tommy Barnhardt (Redskins)
DT Norman Hand (Chargers)	CB Tyronne Drakeford (Redskins)
S Chris Oldham (Steelers)	

=== NFL draft ===
2000 New Orleans Saints draft
Round	Pick	Player	Position	College	Notes
2	33	Darren Howard	Defensive end	Kansas State	
4	96	Terrelle Smith	Fullback	Arizona State	
5	131	Tutan Reyes	Guard	Mississippi	
5	158	Austin Wheatley	Tight end	Iowa	
5	166	Chad Morton	Running back	USC	
6	168	Marc Bulger *	Quarterback	West Virginia	
6	195	Michael Hawthorne	Defensive back	Purdue	
6	200	Sherrod Gideon	Wide receiver	Southern Miss	
7	228	Kevin Houser	Center	Ohio State	
Made roster * Made at least one Pro Bowl during career

=== Undrafted free agents ===
2000 undrafted free agents of note
Player	Position	College
Jamal Brooks	Linebacker	Hampton

== Personnel ==
=== Staff ===
2000 New Orleans Saints staff
Front office: Owner – Tom Benson; General manager of football operations – Randy Mueller; Assistant general manager of football operations – Charles Bailey; Director of football administration – Mickey Loomis; Director of player personnel – Rick Mueller; College scouting coordinator – Rick Thompson; Head coaches: Head coach – Jim Haslett; Assistant head coach/secondary – Rick Venturi; Offensive coaches: Offensive coordinator – Mike McCarthy; Quarterbacks – Frank Cignetti, Jr.; Running backs – Dave Atkins; Wide receivers – Hubbard Alexander; Tight ends – Bob Palcic; Offensive line – Jack Henry; Offensive assistant/quality control – Phil Pettey	Defensive coaches: Defensive coordinator – Ron Zook; Defensive line – Sam Clancy; Linebackers – John Bunting; Secondary assistant – Joe Baker; Defensive assistant/quality control – Winston Moss; Special teams coaches: Special teams – Al Everest; Special teams assistant – Joe Baker; Strength and conditioning: Strength and conditioning – Rock Gullickson; Assistant strength and conditioning – Evan Marcus

=== Roster ===
2000 New Orleans Saints roster
Quarterbacks (QB): 2 Aaron Brooks; 12 Jake Delhomme; 11 Billy Joe Tolliver; Running backs (RB): 20 Terry Allen; 26 Fred McAfee KR; 40 Brian Milne FB; 32 Jerald Moore; 30 Chad Morton; 44 Terrelle Smith FB; 34 Ricky Williams; Wide receivers (WR): 87 Joe Horn; 88 Willie Jackson; 83 Keith Poole; 86 Jake Reed; 80 Robert Wilson; Tight ends (TE): 82 Andrew Glover; 81 Lamont Hall; 89 Dave Stachelski; 84 Austin Wheatley	Offensive linemen (OL): 69 Tom Ackerman C/G; 62 Jerry Fontenot C; 65 Chris Naeole G; 70 Marcus Price T; 76 Tutan Reyes G/T; 77 Willie Roaf T; 78 Daryl Terrell G/T; 68 Kyle Turley T; 63 Wally Williams G; Defensive linemen (DL): 92 Martin Chase DT; 97 La'Roi Glover DT; 99 Norman Hand DT; 93 Darren Howard DE; 94 Joe Johnson DE; 90 Jared Tomich DE; 98 Willie Whitehead DE/DT	Linebackers (LB): 51 Phil Clarke MLB; 55 Mark Fields OLB; 53 Donta Jones OLB; 59 Keith Mitchell OLB; 54 Darrin Smith MLB; Defensive backs (DB): 35 Chris Canty CB; 37 Steve Gleason SS; 36 Michael Hawthorne CB; 27 Rob Kelly FS; 29 Sammy Knight SS; 23 Kevin Mathis; 25 Alex Molden CB; 28 Chris Oldham SS; 39 Darren Perry FS; 22 Fred Thomas CB; Special teams (ST): 10 Doug Brien K; 4 Toby Gowin P; 47 Kevin Houser LS	Practice squad: 46 Corey Harris CB; 19 Michael Lewis WR; 52 Ron Merkerson LB; 61 Blaine Saipaia T; 75 Bobby Setzer DE; Reserve: 18 Jeff Blake QB (IR); 85 Cam Cleeland TE (IR); 56 Charlie Clemons LB (IR); 95 Marques Douglas DE (IR); 79 Mike Halapin DT (PUP); 21 Steve Israel CB (IR); 50 Corey Terry LB (IR); 24 Fred Weary CB (IR); Rookies in italics 53 active, 8 reserve, 5 practice squad

== Preseason ==
Week	Date	Opponent	Result	Record	Venue
1	July 29	at New York Jets	L 20–24	0–1	Giants Stadium
2	August 5	at Minnesota Vikings	W 25–24	1–1	Hubert H. Humphrey Metrodome
3	August 12	at Indianapolis Colts	L 0–17	1–2	Ross–Ade Stadium (West Lafayette)
4	August 25	Miami Dolphins	L 17–22	1–3	Louisiana Superdome

== Regular season ==
=== Schedule ===
Week	Date	Opponent	Result	Record	Venue	Attendance
1	September 3	Detroit Lions	**L** 10–14	0–1	Louisiana Superdome	64,900
2	September 10	at San Diego Chargers	**W** 28–27	1–1	Qualcomm Stadium	51,300
3	September 17	at Seattle Seahawks	**L** 10–20	1–2	Husky Stadium	59,513
4	September 24	Philadelphia Eagles	**L** 7–21	1–3	Louisiana Superdome	64,900
5	Bye					
6	October 8	at Chicago Bears	**W** 31–10	2–3	Soldier Field	66,944
7	October 15	**Carolina Panthers**	**W** 24–6	3–3	Louisiana Superdome	50,015
8	October 22	at **Atlanta Falcons**	**W** 21–19	4–3	Georgia Dome	56,508
9	October 29	at Arizona Cardinals	**W** 21–10	5–3	Sun Devil Stadium	35,016
10	November 5	**San Francisco 49ers**	**W** 31–15	6–3	Louisiana Superdome	64,900
11	November 12	at **Carolina Panthers**	**W** 20–10	7–3	Ericsson Stadium	72,981
12	November 19	Oakland Raiders	**L** 22–31	7–4	Louisiana Superdome	64,900
13	November 26	at **St. Louis Rams**	**W** 31–24	8–4	Trans World Dome	66,064
14	December 3	Denver Broncos	**L** 23–38	8–5	Louisiana Superdome	64,900
15	December 10	at **San Francisco 49ers**	**W** 31–27	9–5	3Com Park	67,892
16	December 17	**Atlanta Falcons**	**W** 23–7	10–5	Louisiana Superdome	64,900
17	December 24	**St. Louis Rams**	**L** 21–26	10–6	Louisiana Superdome	64,900
Note: Intra-division opponents are in **bold** text.

=== Standings ===
NFC West
	W	L	T	PCT	PF	PA	STK
^{(3)} New Orleans Saints	10	6	0	.625	354	305	L1
^{(6)} St. Louis Rams	10	6	0	.625	540	471	W1
Carolina Panthers	7	9	0	.438	310	310	L1
San Francisco 49ers	6	10	0	.375	388	422	L1
Atlanta Falcons	4	12	0	.250	252	413	W1

== Playoffs ==
=== Schedule ===
Week	Date	Opponent (seed)	Result	Record	Venue	Attendance
Wild Card	December 30	St. Louis Rams (6)	W 31–28	1–0	Louisiana Superdome	64,900
Divisional	January 6, 2001	at Minnesota Vikings (2)	L 16–34	1–1	Hubert H. Humphrey Metrodome	63,881

=== Game summaries ===
==== NFC Wild Card Playoffs: vs. (6) St. Louis Rams ====
NFC Wild Card Playoffs: (6) St. Louis Rams at (3) New Orleans Saints – Game summary

Quarter	1	2	3	4	Total
Rams	7	0	0	21	28
Saints	0	10	7	14	31

at Louisiana Superdome, New Orleans, Louisiana

- Date: December 30
- Game time: 3:00 p.m. CST
- Game weather: None (played indoors)
- Game attendance: 64,900
- Referee: Gerald Austin
- TV announcers (ABC): Al Michaels, Dan Fouts, Dennis Miller, Melissa Stark, and Eric Dickerson
- Box score

Game information

First quarter

- STL – Isaac Bruce 17-yard pass from Kurt Warner (Jeff Wilkins kick), 5:58. Rams 7–0. Drive: 11 plays, 68 yards, 6:55.

Second quarter

- NO – Robert Wilson 12-yard pass from Aaron Brooks (Doug Brien kick), 14:56. Tied 7–7. Drive: 11 plays, 70 yards, 6:02.
- NO – Doug Brien 33-yard field goal, 1:30. Saints 10–7. Drive: 4 plays, 5 yards, 0:51.

Third quarter

- NO – Willie Jackson 10-yard pass from Aaron Brooks (Doug Brien kick), 8:40. Saints 17–7. Drive: 7 plays, 45 yards, 3:23.

Fourth quarter

- NO – Willie Jackson 49-yard pass from Aaron Brooks (Doug Brien kick), 13:22. Saints 24–7. Drive: 5 plays, 74 yards, 2:55.
- NO – Willie Jackson 16-yard pass from Aaron Brooks (Doug Brien kick), 11:57. Saints 31–7. Drive: 1 play, 16 yards, 0:05.
- STL – Ricky Proehl 17-yard pass from Kurt Warner (Jeff Wilkins kick), 9:36. Saints 31–14. Drive: 4 plays, 80 yards, 2:21.
- STL – Marshall Faulk 25-yard pass from Kurt Warner (Jeff Wilkins kick), 3:52. Saints 31–21. Drive: 3 plays, 62 yards, 0:48.
- STL – Kurt Warner 5-yard run (Jeff Wilkins kick), 2:36. Saints 31–28. Drive: 5 plays, 47 yards, 1:07.

Top passers

- STL – Kurt Warner – 24/40, 365 yards, 3 TD, 3 INT
- NO – Aaron Brooks – 16/29, 266 yards, 4 TD, INT

Top rushers

- STL – Marshall Faulk – 14 rushes, 24 yards
- NO – Terry Allen – 16 rushes, 21 yards

Top receivers

- STL – Isaac Bruce – 7 receptions, 127 yards, TD
- NO – Willie Jackson – 6 receptions, 142 yards, 3 TD

Saints go to the Divisional Round but lost to the Vikings 34-16.

==== NFC Divisional Playoffs: at (2) Minnesota Vikings ====
NFC Divisional Playoffs: (3) New Orleans Saints at (2) Minnesota Vikings – Game summary

Quarter	1	2	3	4	Total
Saints	3	0	7	6	16
Vikings	10	7	10	7	34

at Hubert H. Humphrey Metrodome, Minneapolis, Minnesota

- Date: January 6, 2001
- Game time: 11:30 a.m. CST
- Game weather: None (played indoors)
- Game attendance: 63,881
- Referee: Walt Coleman
- TV announcers (Fox): Dick Stockton, Matt Millen, and Pam Oliver
- Box score

Game information

First quarter

- MIN – Randy Moss 57-yard pass from Daunte Culpepper (Gary Anderson kick), 11:57. Vikings 7–0. Drive: 3 plays, 64 yards, 1:20.
- NO – Doug Brien 33-yard field goal, 7:46. Vikings 7–3. Drive: 10 plays, 65 yards, 4:11.
- MIN – Gary Anderson 24-yard field goal, 1:36. Vikings 10–3. Drive: 12 plays, 67 yards, 6:10.

Second quarter

- MIN – Cris Carter 17-yard pass from Daunte Culpepper (Gary Anderson kick), 1:29. Vikings 17–3. Drive: 7 plays, 73 yards, 3:40.

Third quarter

- MIN – Randy Moss 68-yard pass from Daunte Culpepper (Gary Anderson kick), 13:33. Vikings 24–3. Drive: 3 plays, 77 yards, 1:27.
- NO – Dave Stachelski 2-yard pass from Aaron Brooks (Doug Brien kick), 9:33. Vikings 24–10. Drive: 8 plays, 83 yards, 4:00.
- MIN – Gary Anderson 44-yard field goal, 4:31. Vikings 27–10. Drive: 10 plays, 50 yards, 5:02.

Fourth quarter

- MIN – Robert Smith 2-yard run (Gary Anderson kick), 10:46. Vikings 34–10. Drive: 8 plays, 29 yards, 4:32.
- NO – Willie Jackson 48-yard pass from Aaron Brooks (pass failed), 2:19. Vikings 34–16. Drive: 3 plays, 66 yards, 0:58.

Top passers

- NO – Aaron Brooks – 30/48, 295 yards, 2 TD, 2 INT
- MIN – Daunte Culpepper – 17/31, 302 yards, 3 TD

Top rushers

- NO – Chad Morton – 5 rushes, 25 yards
- MIN – Robert Smith – 25 rushes, 74 yards, TD

Top receivers

- NO – Willie Jackson – 9 receptions, 125 yards, TD
- MIN – Randy Moss – 2 receptions, 121 yards, 2 TD

Vikings go to the NFC Championship game and there were demolished by the New York Giants 41-0. The Saints missed the playoffs 7-9 in 2001.

== Player stats ==
=== Passing ===
Player	Completions	Attempts	Percentage	Yards	TD	Int	Rating
Jeff Blake	184	302	60.9	2,025	13	9	82.7
Aaron Brooks	113	194	58.2	1,514	9	6	85.7

==== Rushing ====
Player	Attempts	Yards	Avg Yards	Long	Touchdowns
Ricky Williams	248	1000	4.0	26	8
Jeff Blake	57	243	4.3	20	1
Terry Allen	46	179	3.9	18	2
Aaron Brooks	41	170	4.1	29	2

==== Receiving ====
Player	Attempts	Yards	Avg Yards	Long	Touchdowns
Joe Horn	94	1340	14.3	52	8
Ricky Williams	44	409	9.3	24	1
Willie Jackson	37	523	14.1	53	6
Chad Morton	30	213	7.1	35	0
Keith Poole	21	293	14.0	49	1
Andrew Glover	21	281	13.4	39	4

=== Defense ===
==== Sacks ====
Player	Number
La'Roi Glover	17
Joe Johnson	12
Darren Howard	11
Keith Mitchell	6.5
Willie Whitehead	5.5

==== Interceptions ====
Player	Number	Yards	Avg Yards	Long	Touchdowns
Sammy Knight	5	68	13.6	37	2
Alex Molden	3	24	8.0	24	0
Darren Perry	3	3	1.0	3	0

== Awards and records ==
- Jim Haslett, AP Coach of the Year,
- Jim Haslett, College and Pro Football Newsweekly Coach of the Year,
- Jim Haslett, Football Digest Coach of the Year,
- Jim Haslett, Football News Coach of the Year,
- Jim Haslett, Pro Football Writers Association Coach of the Year,
- Jim Haslett, Sports Illustrated Coach of the Year
- Jim Haslett, USA Today NFC Coach of the Year,

=== Milestones ===
- Ricky Williams, 1st 1000 rushing yards season
