= List of Los Angeles Rams starting quarterbacks =

American football starting quarterbacks

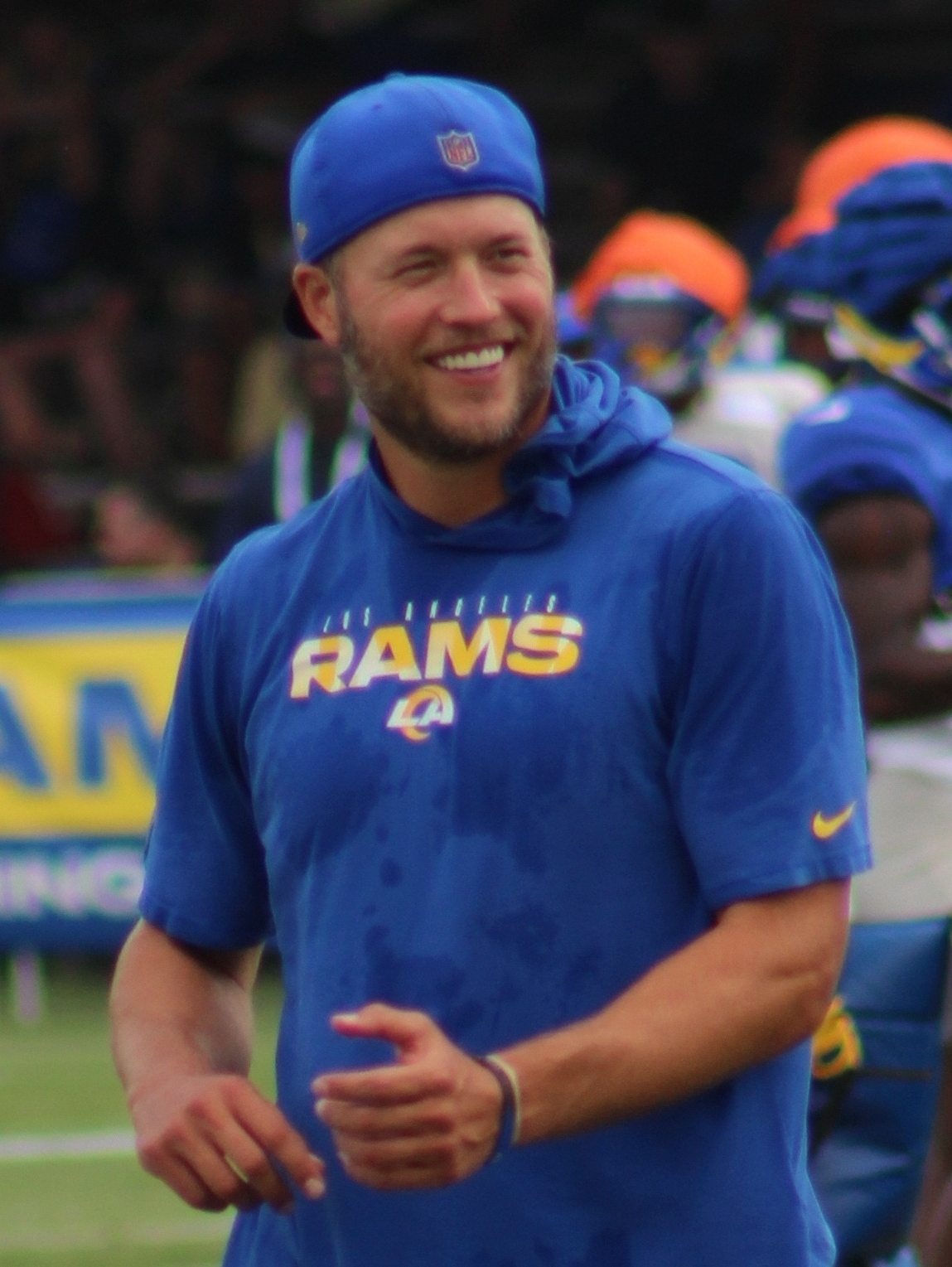
Matthew Stafford won a championship as the Rams' starting quarterback during Super Bowl LVI at the end of the 2021 season.

The Los Angeles Rams are a professional American football team based in the Greater Los Angeles area of California. The Rams have competed in the National Football League (NFL) since 1937, one year after their formation in Cleveland, Ohio, as a charter member of the second incarnation of the American Football League. The team moved to Los Angeles in 1946 where they became the city's first professional sports team. They first played their home games at the Los Angeles Memorial Coliseum before moving to Anaheim, California, in 1980, where they played their home games at Anaheim Stadium. The Rams moved to St. Louis, Missouri, in 1995, and remained there for two decades until they returned to Los Angeles after the 2015 NFL season. Currently, they are members of the Western Division of the National Football Conference (NFC) and play their home games at SoFi Stadium in Inglewood, California.

The early era of the NFL and American football in general was not conducive to passing the football, with the forward pass not being legalized until the early 1900s and not fully adopted for many more years. Although the quarterback position has historically been the one to receive the snap and thus handle the football on every offensive play, the importance of the position during this era was limited by various rules, like having to be five yards behind the line of scrimmage before a forward pass could be attempted. These rules and the tactical focus on rushing the ball limited the importance of the quarterback position while enhancing the value of different types of backs, such as the halfback and the fullback. Some of these backs were considered triple-threat men, capable of rushing, passing or kicking the football, making it common for multiple players to attempt a pass during a game.

As rules changed and the NFL began adopting a more pass-centric approach to offensive football, the importance of the quarterback position grew. Beginning in 1950, total wins and losses by a team's starting quarterback were tracked. Throughout the late 20th century and early 21st century, the significance of the position has grown exponentially. The modern starting quarterback is often viewed as the leader of the team and its player spokesperson. The position is often the highest paid player on an NFL team's roster, with teams assigning significant resources in trying to draft, acquire or trade for a franchise quarterback. These resources are based on the high expectations placed on the position, which include handling the ball on every offensive play (whether it be to pass the ball or hand it off to another player), relaying plays (or sometimes calling plays themselves) to the offense and understanding every teammate's role, formation and responsibility for every play. The emergence of the dual-threat quarterback has also seen additional focus on the position, with quarterbacks like Lamar Jackson and Josh Allen leading their team in both passing and rushing yards during any given game.

Prior to 1950, the Rams had numerous players identified as playing the quarterback position, including Pro Football Hall of Fame inductee Bob Waterfield. However, the combination of unreliable statistics in the early era of the NFL and the differences in the early quarterback position make tracking starts by quarterbacks impractical for this timeframe. Since 1950 however, the Rams have had 58 starting quarterbacks in the history of their franchise. Eight of those quarterbacks made over 50 starts, and three of them were inducted into the Pro Football Hall of Fame: Norm Van Brocklin, Kurt Warner, and Waterfield. Joe Namath was also inducted into the Pro Football Hall of Fame.

== Starting quarterbacks ==
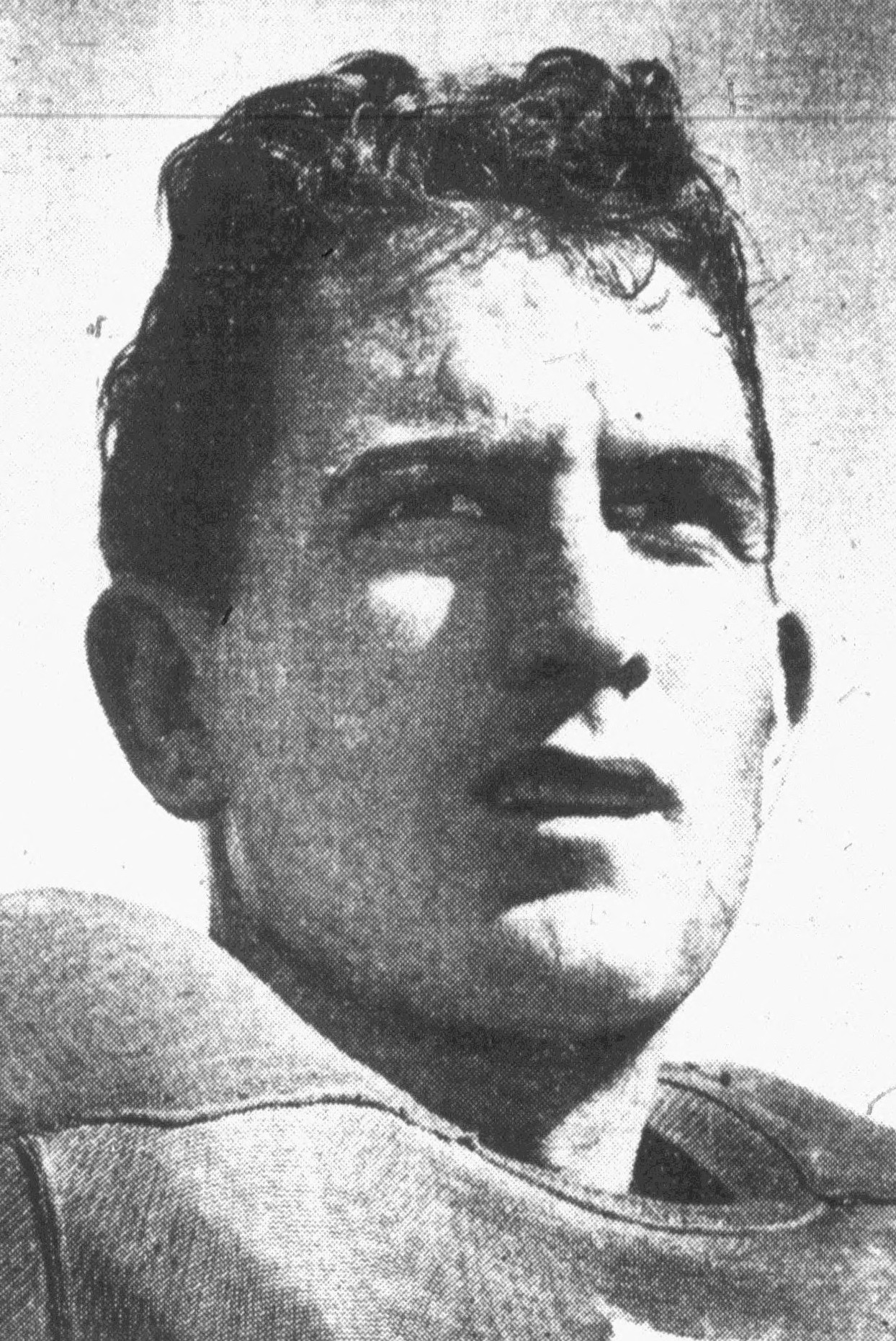
Bob Waterfield won two NFL championships as the Rams' starting quarterback from 1945 to 1952.

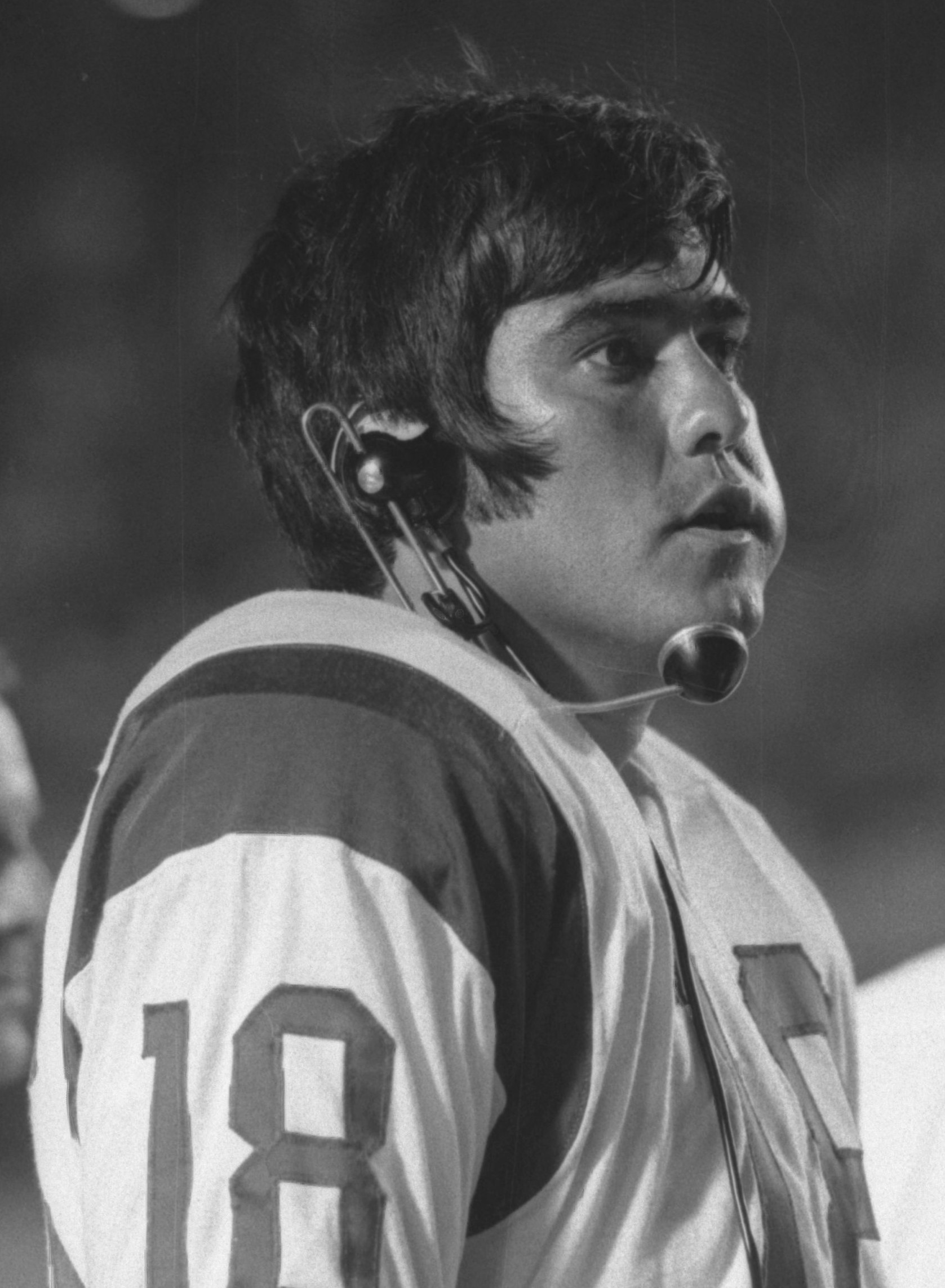
Roman Gabriel started 121 games as the Rams' quarterback from 1962 to 1972.

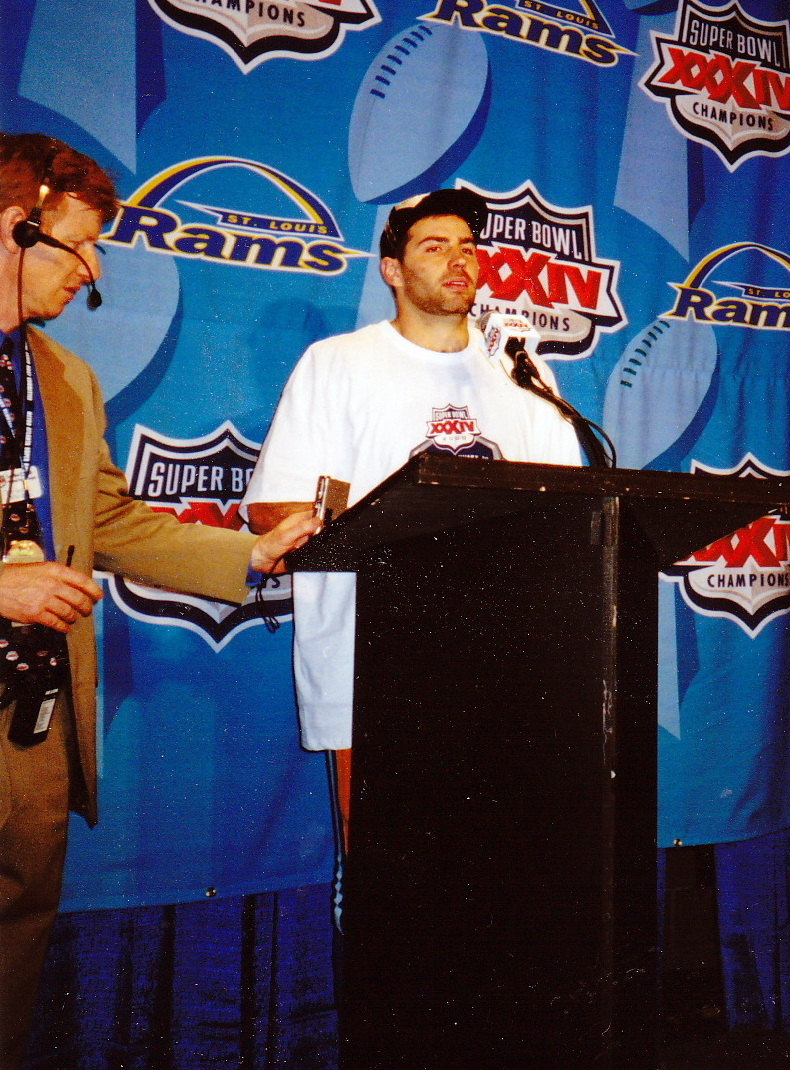
Kurt Warner led the team to a win in Super Bowl XXXIV at the end of the 1999 season and earned both the NFL Most Valuable Player Award and Super Bowl Most Valuable Player Award for the season.

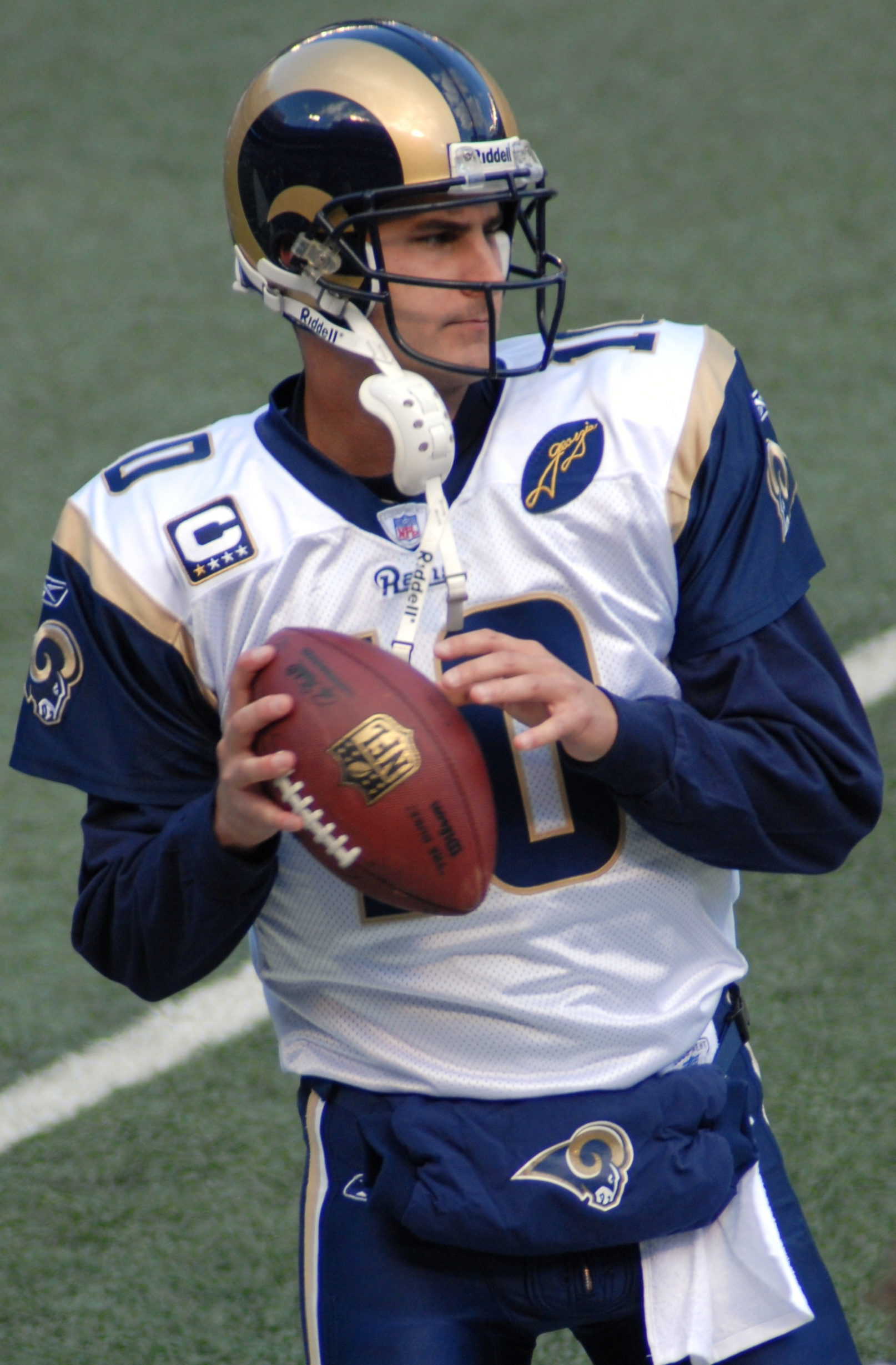
Marc Bulger started 98 games for the Rams from 2002 to 2009.

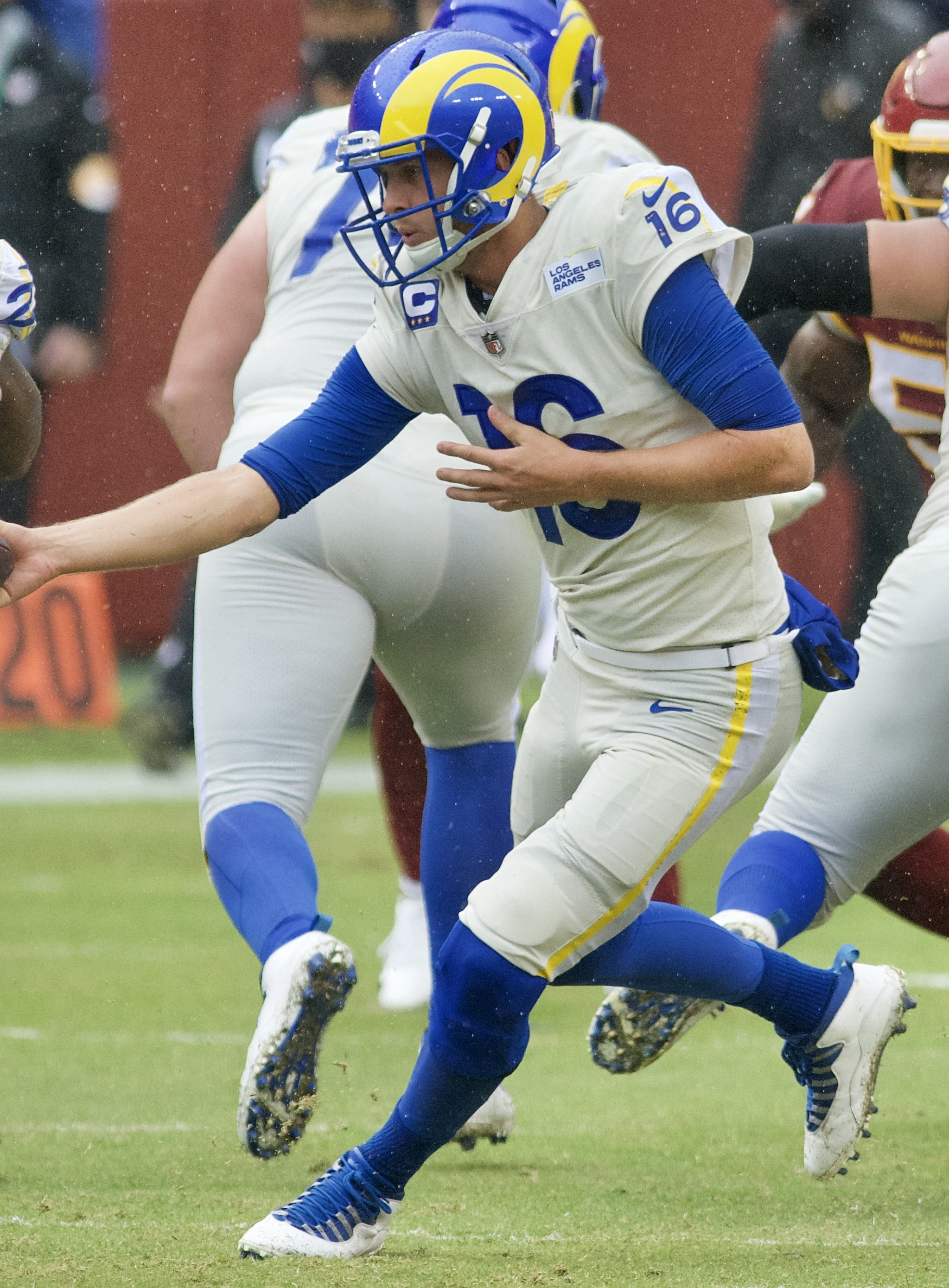
Jared Goff started 74 games for the Rams from 2016 to 2020.

Key
‡	Inducted into the Pro Football Hall of Fame

=== Regular season ===
Cleveland/Los Angeles/St. Louis starting quarterbacks in the regular season
Quarterback	Seasons with the Rams	Seasons with at least one start as QB	Games started	Record				Refs
Quarterback	Seasons with the Rams	Seasons with at least one start as QB	Games started	W	L	T	% (Note: Winning percentage is determined by dividing total wins by total games started, with ties counting as one-half win.)	Refs
Terry Baker	1963–1965	1963	1	0	1	0	.000	
Tony Banks	1996–1998	1996–1998	43	14	29	0	.326	
Steve Bartkowski	1986	1986	6	4	2	0	.667	
Pete Beathard	1972–1973	1972	2	0	1	1	.250	
Brock Berlin	2007–2008	2007	1	0	1	0	.000	
Kyle Boller	2009	2009	4	0	4	0	.000	
Steve Bono	1998	1998	2	0	2	0	.000	
Sam Bradford	2010–2014	2010–2013	49	18	30	1	.378	
Zeke Bratkowski	1961–1963	1961–1963	24	3	21	0	.125	
Dieter Brock	1985	1985	15	11	4	0	.733	
Marc Bulger	2000–2009	2002–2009	95	41	54	0	.432	
Chris Chandler	1994, 04	1994, 04	8	2	6	0	.250	
Kellen Clemens	2011–2013	2011–2013	12	4	8	0	.333	
Scott Covington	2002–2003	2002	1	0	1	0	.000	
Austin Davis	2012, 13–14	2014	8	3	5	0	.375	
Steve Dils	1984–1987	1986–1987	9	4	5	0	.444	
Jim Everett	1986–1993	1986–1993	105	46	59	0	.438	
A. J. Feeley	2010–2011	2011	3	1	2	0	.333	
Vince Ferragamo	1977–1980, 82–84	1979–1980, 82–84	44	26	18	0	.591	
Ryan Fitzpatrick	2005–2006	2005	3	0	3	0	.000	
Nick Foles	2015	2015	11	4	7	0	.364	
Gus Frerotte	2006–2007	2007	3	1	2	0	.333	
Roman Gabriel	1962–1972	1962–1972	119	74	39	6	.647	
Jimmy Garoppolo	2024	2024	1	0	1	0	.000	
Jared Goff	2016–2020	2016–2020	69	42	27	0	.609	
Trent Green	1999–2000, 08	2000, 08	6	2	4	0	.333	
Pat Haden	1976–1981	1976–1981	55	35	19	1	.645	
John Hadl	1973–1974	1973–1974	19	15	4	0	.789	
James Harris	1973–1976	1974–1976	27	21	6	0	.778	
Shaun Hill	2014	2014	8	3	5	0	.375	
Buddy Humphrey	1959–1960	1960	1	0	1	0	.000	
Ron Jaworski	1973–1976	1975–1976	3	3	0	0	1.000	
Bert Jones	1982	1982	4	1	3	0	.250	
Case Keenum	2015–2016	2015–2016	14	7	7	0	.500	
Jeff Kemp	1981–1985	1984–1985	14	9	5	0	.643	
Sean Mannion	2015–2018	2017	1	0	1	0	.000	
Jamie Martin	1993–1996, 01–02, 04–05	2002, 05	7	4	3	0	.571	
Baker Mayfield	2022	2022	4	1	3	0	.250	
Chris Miller	1994–1995	1994–1995	23	9	14	0	.391	
Ron Miller	1962	1962	1	0	1	0	.000	
Bill Munson	1964–1967	1964–1965	18	3	13	2	.222	
Joe Namath ‡	1977	1977	4	2	2	0	.500	
Keith Null	2009	2009	4	0	4	0	.000	
Dan Pastorini	1981	1981	5	1	4	0	.200	
Bryce Perkins	2020–2022	2022	1	0	1	0	.000	
T. J. Rubley	1993–1995	1993	7	2	5	0	.286	
Jeff Rutledge	1979–1982	1979	1	0	1	0	.000	
Frank Ryan	1958–1961	1959–1961	11	5	5	1	.500	
Brett Rypien	2023	2023	1	0	1	0	.000	
Mark Rypien	1995	1995	3	0	3	0	.000	
Matthew Stafford	2021–2026	2021–2026	76	47	29	0	.618	
Norm Van Brocklin ‡	1949–1957	1950–1957	65	42	20	3	.669	
Bill Wade	1954–1960	1954, 56, 58–60	36	13	23	0	.361	
Steve Walsh	1996	1996	3	1	2	0	.333	
Kurt Warner ‡	1998–2003	1999–2003	50	35	15	0	.700	
Bob Waterfield ‡	1945–1952	1950–1952	22 (Note: Waterfield's win-loss record only accounts for seasons he played starting in 1950, the year in which the NFL began recording said statistic for starting quarterbacks.)	14	8	0	.636	
Carson Wentz	2023	2023	1	1	0	0	1.000	
John Wolford	2019–2022	2020, 22	4	2	2	0	.500	

=== Postseason ===
Cleveland/Los Angeles/St. Louis starting quarterbacks in the postseason
Quarterback	Seasons with the Rams	Seasons with at least one start as QB	Games started	Record			Refs
Quarterback	Seasons with the Rams	Seasons with at least one start as QB	Games started	W	L	%	Refs
Marc Bulger	2002–2009	2003–2004	3	1	2	.333	
Vince Ferragamo	1977–1980, 82–84	1979–1980, 83	6	3	3	.500	
Roman Gabriel	1962–1972	1967, 69	2	0	2	.000	
Jared Goff	2016–2020	2017–2018, 20	5	2	3	.400	
Pat Haden	1976–1981	1976–1978	5	2	3	.400	
John Hadl	1973–1974	1973	1	0	1	.000	
James Harris	1973–1976	1974–1975	3	1	2	.333	
Ron Jaworski	1973–1976	1975	1	1	0	1.000	
Jeff Kemp	1981–1985	1984	1	0	1	.000	
Matthew Stafford	2021–2025	2021, 23–25	8	6	2	.750	
Norm Van Brocklin ‡	1949–1957	1952, 55	2	0	2	.524	
Kurt Warner ‡	1998–2003	1999–2001	7	5	2	.714	
Bob Waterfield ‡	1945–1952	1950–1951	2	1	1	.500	
John Wolford	2019–2022	2020	1	1	0	1.000	

== See also ==
- List of current NFL starting quarterbacks
- List of Los Angeles Rams team records
- Lists of Los Angeles Rams players
