= List of Los Angeles Rams team records =

This page details statistics about the Los Angeles Rams American football franchise, formerly the St. Louis Rams and the Cleveland Rams.

== Franchise firsts ==
- First NFL game – a 28–0 loss to the Detroit Lions, 9/10/37
- First NFL win – a 21–3 victory over the Philadelphia Eagles, 9/17/37
- First winning season – 1945 (9–1)
- First championship season – 1945
- First player drafted – Johnny Drake, 1937
- First Ram elected to the Hall of Fame – QB Bob Waterfield, 1965
- First to pass 400 yards in a game – Jim Hardy, 406 yards vs. Chicago Cardinals, 10/31/48
- First to rush 200 yards in a game – Dan Towler, 205 yards vs. the Baltimore Colts, 11/22/53
- First 1,000-yard rusher in a season – Dick Bass, 1,033 yards (1962)
- First Super Bowl appearance – a 31–19 loss to the Pittsburgh Steelers in Super Bowl XIV, 1/20/80

=== Wins/losses in a season ===
- Most games won in a season (regular season): 14, 2001
- Most games won in a season (including postseason): 16, 1999, 2001, 2021
- Most games lost in a season: 15, 2009

== Individual records ==
=== Appearances ===
- Most seasons in a Rams uniform – 20, Jackie Slater (1976–1995) (tied for the most seasons played with one team along with Darrell Green)
- Most games played in a Rams uniform – 259, Jackie Slater (1976–1995)
- Most consecutive games played in a Rams uniform – 201, Jack Youngblood (1971–1984)
- Most Pro Bowls – 14, Merlin Olsen (1962–1975)

=== Game ===
- Points – 24, eleven times, last time by Todd Gurley, vs Seattle Seahawks, 12/17/17
- Touchdowns – 4, eleven times, last time by Todd Gurley, vs Seattle Seahawks, 12/17/17
- Rushing yards – 247, Willie Ellison, vs Green Bay Packers, 12/05/71
- Rushing touchdowns – 4, Marshall Faulk, vs Minnesota Vikings, 12/10/00
- Passing yards – 554, Norm Van Brocklin, vs New York Yanks, 28 September 1951
- Passing touchdowns – 6, 11 times, last time by Matthew Stafford, vs Jacksonville Jaguars, 10/19/25
- Receptions – 18, Tom Fears, vs Green Bay Packers, 12/03/50
- Receiving yards – 336, Willie "Flipper" Anderson, vs New Orleans Saints, 11/26/89
- Receiving touchdowns – 4, four times, last time by Isaac Bruce, vs San Francisco 49ers, 10/10/99
- Total yards – 336 (336 receiving), Willie "Flipper" Anderson, vs New Orleans Saints, 11/26/89
- Interceptions – 3, many times, last time by Keith Lyle, vs Atlanta Falcons, 12/15/96
- Sacks – 5, Gary Jeter, vs Los Angeles Raiders, 09/18/88
- Field goals – 7, Greg Zuerlein, at Dallas Cowboys, 10/01/17
- Punts – 12, two times, last time by Rusty Jackson, vs San Francisco 49ers, 11/21/76
- Punting average yards – 56.4, Johnny Hekker, vs Philadelphia Eagles, 12/10/17
- Kickoff returns – 8, Tony Horne, vs Kansas City Chiefs, 10/22/00
- Kickoff return yards – 267, Tony Horne, vs Kansas City Chiefs, 10/22/00
- Punt returns – 7, nine times, last time by Pharoh Cooper, vs Seattle Seahawks, 12/17/17
- Punt return yards – 207, LeRoy Irvin, vs Atlanta Falcons, 11/14/81

=== Season ===
- Points – 163 Jeff Wilkins (2003)
- Touchdowns – 26 (18-run, 8-pass) Marshall Faulk (2000)
- Rushing yards – 2,105 Eric Dickerson (1984)
- Rushing touchdowns – 18, two times, last time by Marshall Faulk (2000)
- Passer rating – 109.2, two times, last time by Matthew Stafford (2025)
- Passing yards – 4,886 Matthew Stafford (2021)
- Passing touchdowns – 46 Matthew Stafford (2025)
- Most wins by a starting quarterback – 14 Kurt Warner (2001)
- Receptions – 145 Cooper Kupp (2021)
- Receiving yards – 1,947 Cooper Kupp (2021)
- Receiving touchdowns – 17 Elroy "Crazylegs" Hirsch (1951)
- Total yards – 2,429 (1,381 rushing, 1,048 receiving) Marshall Faulk (1999)
- Interceptions – 14 Dick "Night Train" Lane (1952)
- Sacks – 20.5 Aaron Donald (2018)
- Field goals – 39 Jeff Wilkins (2003)
- Punts – 105 Donnie Jones (2011)
- Punting average yards – 47.93 Johnny Hekker (2015)
- Kickoff returns – 66 Danny Amendola (2009)
- Kickoff return yards – 1,618 Danny Amendola (2009)
- Punt returns – 56 Eddie Brown (1979)
- Punt return yards – 618 Jackie Wallace (1978)

=== Rookie season ===
- Points – 120, Eric Dickerson (1983)
- Touchdowns – 20, Eric Dickerson (1983)
- Field goals – 29, Frank Corral (1978)
- Receptions – 105, Puka Nacua (2023)
- Receiving yards – 1486, Puka Nacua (2023)
- Receiving touchdowns – 10, Bucky Pope (1964)
- Rushing yards – 1,808, Eric Dickerson (1983)
- Rushing touchdowns – 18, Eric Dickerson (1983)
- Total yards – 2,212 (1,808 rushing, 404, receiving), Eric Dickerson (1983)
- Passer rating – 81.8, Dieter Brock (1985)
- Passing yards – 3,512, Sam Bradford (2010)
- Passing touchdowns – 18, Sam Bradford (2010)
- Most wins by a starting quarterback
- Interceptions – 14, Dick "Night Train" Lane (1952)
- Sacks – 9.0, Aaron Donald (2014)
- Punts – 93, Ken Clark (1979)
- Punting average – 45.8, Johnny Hekker (2012)
- Punt returns – 42, LeRoy Irvin (1980)
- Punt return yards – 427, Verda Smith (1949)
- Kickoff returns – 56, Tony Horne (1998)
- Kickoff return yards – 1,306, Tony Horne (1998)

=== Career ===
- Scoring – 1,223, Jeff Wilkins (1997–2007)
- Touchdowns – 85, Marshall Faulk (1999–2005)
- Rushing yards – 10,138, Steven Jackson (2004–2012)
- Rushing touchdowns – 58, Marshall Faulk (1999–2005)
- Passer rating – 97.2, Kurt Warner (1998–2003)
- Passing yards – 23,758, Jim Everett (1986–1993)
- Passing touchdowns – 154, Roman Gabriel (1962–1972)
- Most wins by a starting quarterback – 74, Roman Gabriel (1962–1972)
- Receiving yards – 14,109, Isaac Bruce (1994–2007)
- Receptions – 942, Isaac Bruce (1994–2007)
- Net yards – 14,259 (150 rushing, 14,109 receiving), Isaac Bruce (1994–2007)
- Sacks – 159.5, Deacon Jones (1961–1971) (since all of Jones's sacks are before 1982, this is an unofficial statistic).
- Interceptions – 46, Eddie Meador (1959–1970)
- Field goals – 265, Jeff Wilkins (1997–2007)
- Punting average – 48.0, Donnie Jones (2007–2011)
- Kickoff returns – 171, Drew Hill (1979–1984)
- Kickoff return yards – 3,918, Ron Brown (1984–1989, 1991)
- Kickoff return average – 26.3, Ron Brown (1984–1989, 1991)
- Punt returns – 158, Tavon Austin (2013–2016)
- Punt return yards – 1,527, Henry Ellard (1983–1993)
- Punt return average – 11.4, Az-Zahir Hakim (1998–2001)

=== Playoff games ===
- Points – 18, Tom Fears, vs. Chicago Bears, 12/17/50
- Touchdowns – 3, Tom Fears, vs. Chicago Bears, 12/17/50
- Field goals – 5, Jeff Wilkins, vs. Carolina Panthers, 01/10/04
- Rushing yards – 248, Eric Dickerson, vs. Dallas Cowboys, 01/04/86
- Rushing touchdowns – 2, four times, last by C. J. Anderson, vs. Dallas Cowboys, 01/12/19
- Passing yards – 414, Kurt Warner, vs. Tennessee Titans, 01/30/00
- Passing touchdowns – 5, Kurt Warner, vs. Minnesota Vikings, 01/16/00
- Receptions – 9, three times, last by Robert Woods, vs Atlanta Falcons, 01/06/18
- Receiving yards – 198, Tom Fears, vs. Chicago Bears, 12/17/50
- Receiving touchdowns – 3, Tom Fears, vs. Chicago Bears, 12/17/50
- Punts – 11, Dale Hatcher, at Chicago Bears, 01/12/86
- Punt returns – 6, Eddie Brown, at Tampa Bay Buccaneers, 01/06/80
- Punt return yardage – 72, Az-Zahir Hakim, vs. Minnesota Vikings, 01/16/00
- Punt return touchdowns – 1, Verda Smith, at Detroit Lions, 12/21/52
- Kick returns – 7, Henry Ellard, at Washington Redskins, 01/01/84
- Kick return yardage – 174, Tony Horne, vs. Minnesota Vikings, 01/16/00
- Interceptions – 2, four times, last by Aeneas Williams, vs. Green Bay Packers, 01/20/02
- Interception return yards – 94, LeRoy Irvin, at Dallas Cowboys, 12/26/83
- Sacks – 3, twice, last by Kevin Greene, at Minnesota Vikings, 12/26/88

=== Playoff career ===
- Most Ram playoff game appearances – 18, Jackie Slater (1976–1994)
- Points – 63, Jeff Wilkins (1997–2007)
- Touchdowns – 7, Marshall Faulk (1999–2005)
- Field goals – 14, Jeff Wilkins (1997–2006)
- Rushing yards – 687, Lawrence McCutcheon (1972–1979)
- Rushing touchdowns – 5, Marshall Faulk (1999–2005)
- Passing yards – 3,024, Matthew Stafford (2021– )
- Passing touchdowns – 21, Matthew Stafford (2021– )
- Most wins by a starting quarterback – 7, Matthew Stafford (2021– )
- Receptions – 43, Marshall Faulk (1999–2005)
- Receiving yards – 719, Isaac Bruce (1994–2007)
- Receiving touchdowns – 5, Tom Fears (1948–1956)
- Punts – 35, Bob Waterfield (1946–1952)
- Punt returns – 12, Az-Zahir Hakim (1999–2001)
- Punt return yardage – 12.4, Az-Zahir Hakim (1999–2001)
- Kick returns – 14, Tony Horne (1999–2000) and Cullen Bryant (1973–1982, 1987)
- Kick return yardage – 24.0, Tony Horne (1999–2000)
- Interceptions – 6, Bill Simpson (1974–1978)
- Interception return yards – 149, LeRoy Irvin (1980–1989)
- Interception touchdowns – 2, Aeneas Williams (2001–2005)
- Sacks – 8.5, Jack Youngblood (1971–1984)

=== Most career passing yards ===
Rank	Player	Total yards
1	Jim Everett	23,758
2	Marc Bulger	22,814
3	Roman Gabriel	22,223
4	Matthew Stafford	19,562
5	Norm Van Brocklin	16,114
6	Kurt Warner	14,447
7	Jared Goff	14,219
8	Bob Waterfield	11,849
9	Sam Bradford	11,065
10	Vince Ferragamo	9,376

=== Most career passing touchdowns ===
Rank	Player	Touchdowns
1	Roman Gabriel	154
2	Jim Everett	142
3	Matthew Stafford	141
4	Marc Bulger	122
5	Norm Van Brocklin	118
6	Kurt Warner	102
7	Bob Waterfield	97
8	Jared Goff	87
9	Vince Ferragamo	70
10	Sam Bradford	59

=== Most career rushing yards ===
Rank	Player	Total yards
1	Steven Jackson	10,138
2	Eric Dickerson	7,245
3	Marshall Faulk	6,959
4	Lawrence McCutcheon	6,186
5	Dick Bass	5,417
6	Todd Gurley	5,404
7	Kyren Williams	3,875
8	Dan Towler	3,493
9	Les Josephson	3,407
10	Tank Younger	3,296

=== Most career rushing touchdowns ===
Rank	Player	Touchdowns
1(t)	Marshall Faulk	58
1(t)	Todd Gurley	58
2(t)	Eric Dickerson	56
2(t)	Steven Jackson	56
5	Dan Towler	44
6	Kyren Williams	37
7	Dick Bass	34
8	Wendell Tyler	33
9(t)	Tank Younger	31
9(t)	Greg Bell	31

=== Most career receptions ===
Rank	Player	Receptions
1	Isaac Bruce	942
2	Torry Holt	869
3	Cooper Kupp	634
4	Henry Ellard	593
5	Marshall Faulk	470
6	Steven Jackson	407
7	Tom Fears	400
8	Tyler Higbee	388
9	Robert Woods	367
10	Elroy "Crazylegs" Hirsch	343

=== Most career receiving yards ===
Rank	Player	Total yards
1	Isaac Bruce	14.109
2	Torry Holt	12,660
3	Henry Ellard	9,761
4	Cooper Kupp	7,776
5	Elroy "Crazylegs" Hirsch	6,299
6	Jack Snow	6,012
7	Tom Fears	5,397
8	Willie "Flipper" Anderson	5,246
9	Jim Phillips	4,953
10	Robert Woods	4,626

=== Most career receiving touchdowns ===
Rank	Player	Touchdowns
1	Isaac Bruce	84
2	Torry Holt	74
3	Cooper Kupp	57
4	Elroy "Crazylegs" Hirsch	53
5	Henry Ellard	48
6	Jack Snow	45
7	Jim Benton	42
8	Tom Fears	38
9	Harold Jackson	36
10	Bob Boyd	28
