= Joe Johnson (defensive end) =

American football player (born 1972)

No. 94, 91
- Position: Defensive end

Personal information
- Born: July 11, 1972 (age 54); Cleveland, Ohio, U.S.
- Listed height: 6 ft 4 in (1.93 m)
- Listed weight: 275 lb (125 kg)

Career information
- High school: Jennings (MO)
- College: Louisville
- NFL draft: 1994: 1st round, 13th overall pick

Career history
- New Orleans Saints (1994–2001); Green Bay Packers (2002–2003)

Awards and highlights
- NFL Comeback Player of the Year (2000); 2× Pro Bowl (1998, 2000); PFWA All-Rookie Team (1994); New Orleans Saints Hall of Fame

Career NFL statistics
- Tackles: 400
- Sacks: 52.5
- Forced fumbles: 13
- Stats at Pro Football Reference

Joseph T. Johnson (born July 11, 1972) is an American former professional football player who was a defensive end in the National Football League (NFL) for the New Orleans Saints and the Green Bay Packers. In the 1994 NFL draft, he was selected by the Saints in the first round with the 13th overall pick. He was elected to the Pro Bowl after the 1998 season, missed the entire 1999 season with a severe knee injury that left his career in doubt, but came back in 2000 to once again be named to the Pro Bowl and also named the NFL Comeback Player of the Year. In 2002 Green Bay picked him up in free agency and ESPN named him the biggest free agency bust in Green Bay's history. The Packers gave the former Saints defender a six-year, $33 million contract that included a $6.5 million signing bonus. What they got in return was two sacks in 11 games over two injury filled seasons, before they cut him. He played college football for the Louisville Cardinals. He was inducted into the Kentucky Pro Football Hall of Fame in 2019.

== NFL career statistics ==
Legend
**Bold**	Career high

=== Regular season ===
Year	Team	Games		Tackles				Interceptions				Fumbles			
Year	Team	GP	GS	Comb	Solo	Ast	Sck	Int	Yds	TD	Lng	FF	FR	Yds	TD
1994	NOR	15	14	46	36	10	1.0	0	0	0	0	2	1	0	0
1995	NOR	14	14	50	36	14	5.5	0	0	0	0	1	0	0	0
1996	NOR	13	13	60	50	10	7.5	0	0	0	0	**3**	0	0	0
1997	NOR	16	16	46	39	7	8.5	0	0	0	0	1	1	0	0
1998	NOR	16	16	**70**	**54**	**16**	7.0	0	0	0	0	1	1	**5**	**1**
2000	NOR	16	15	48	38	10	**12.0**	0	0	0	0	**3**	**2**	0	0
2001	NOR	16	16	64	53	11	9.0	0	0	0	0	2	**2**	0	0
2002	GNB	5	5	10	6	4	2.0	0	0	0	0	0	1	0	0
2003	GNB	6	6	6	6	0	0.0	0	0	0	0	0	0	0	0
		117	115	400	318	82	52.5	0	0	0	0	13	8	5	1

=== Playoffs ===
Year	Team	Games		Tackles				Interceptions				Fumbles			
Year	Team	GP	GS	Comb	Solo	Ast	Sck	Int	Yds	TD	Lng	FF	FR	Yds	TD
2000	NOR	2	2	6	6	0	0.0	0	0	0	0	0	0	0	0
		2	2	6	6	0	0.0	0	0	0	0	0	0	0	0
