= Austin Wheatley =

American football player (born 1977)

No. 84
- Position: Tight end

Personal information
- Born: November 16, 1977 (age 48); Milan, Illinois, U.S.
- Listed height: 6 ft 3 in (1.91 m)
- Listed weight: 254 lb (115 kg)

Career information
- High school: Rock Island (Rock Island, Illinois)
- College: Iowa
- NFL draft: 2000: 5th round, 158th overall pick

Career history
- New Orleans Saints (2000); Denver Broncos (2001)*; Dallas Cowboys (2001–2002)*; Oakland Raiders (2002)*
- * Offseason or practice squad member only
- Stats at Pro Football Reference

Austin Wheatley (born November 16, 1977) is an American former professional football player who was a tight end in the National Football League (NFL). He played college football for the Iowa Hawkeyes. He was selected in the fifth round of the 2000 NFL draft by the New Orleans Saints.

== Early life ==
Wheatley was born in Milan, Illinois and attended Rock Island High School in Rock Island, Illinois. While there, he lettered in football as well as track and field. He was named First-team Division 5A All-State, All-Metro and All-Conference as both a tight end and punter. He was named to the Top 100 Illinois Seniors by the Champaign News-Gazette as a tight end. In 1994, he averaged 43 yards-per-punt and recorded nine receptions for 271 yards with three touchdowns. He also set a school record with a 68-yard punt.

While at Rock Island, Wheatley was also a member of the National Honor Society.

== College career ==
Wheatley attended Iowa where he played both tight end and punter. As a freshman in 1995, he redshirted and was named the offensive scout team MVP against Wisconsin. In 1996, he played sparingly as a tight end and on special teams but recorded no statistics. In 1997, he played as a tight end and punter, early in the season. Midway through the season, he suffered and hand injury. For the season, as a tight end, he recorded seven receptions for 108 yards and one touchdown and as a punter he punted the ball five times with an average of 41 yards and the longest being 59 yards. Two of his five punts where downed inside the 20-yard line. He was named Special teams MVP against Northern Iowa and awarded the Offensive Hustle Award against Illinois. In 1998, he appeared in 11 games with one start, against Indiana. For the season he recorded nine receptions for 137 yards. He was awarded the Offensive Hustle award against Iowa State. As a senior in 1999, he appeared in 11 games with three starts. He recorded nine receptions for 103 yards.

While at Iowa, Wheatley majored in art.

== Professional career ==
Wheatley was selected in the fifth round (158th overall) 2000 NFL draft by the New Orleans Saints. As a rookie, he appeared in the first four games of the 2000 season. On August 28, 2001, he was released by the Saints. On October 5, 2001, he was signed by the Denver Broncos to their practice squad. He was released 11 days later on October 16. On December 26, 2001, he was signed by the Dallas Cowboys to their practice squad. On May 23, 2002, he was released by the Cowboys. On October 2, 2002, he was signed by the Oakland Raiders to their practice squad. He was released a week later.

== Personal life ==
On January 29, 2001, Wheatley and teammate Tutan Reyes where summoned to appear in court in regards to the beating of two men. The two players were alleged to have chased the two men after someone had broken into Reye's Chevrolet Suburban at Wheatley's apartment complex. The victims alleged they were assaulted without warning. Deputies said the two were not involved in the break-in.
