= 1999 All-Pro Team =

Official list of the best NFL players in 1999

The 1999 All-Pro Team is composed of the National Football League players that were named to the Associated Press, Pro Football Writers Association, and The Sporting News All-Pro Teams in 1999. Both first and second teams are listed for the AP team. These are the three teams that are included in Total Football II: The Official Encyclopedia of the National Football League. In 1999, the Pro Football Writers Association and Pro Football Weekly combined their All-pro teams, a practice which continues through 2008.

== Teams ==
Offense
Position	First team	Second team
Quarterback	Kurt Warner, St. Louis Rams (AP, PFWA, TSN)	Peyton Manning, Indianapolis Colts (AP-2)
Running back	Marshall Faulk, St. Louis Rams (AP, PFWA, TSN); Edgerrin James, Indianapolis Colts (AP, PFWA, TSN)	Stephen Davis, Washington Redskins (AP-2); Eddie George, Tennessee Titans (AP-2t); Curtis Martin, New York Jets (AP-2t)
Fullback	Mike Alstott, Tampa Bay Buccaneers (AP)	Sam Gash, Buffalo Bills (AP-2)
Wide receiver	Marvin Harrison, Indianapolis Colts (AP, PFWA, TSN); Cris Carter, Minnesota Vikings (AP, PFWA); Isaac Bruce, St. Louis Rams (TSN)	Isaac Bruce, St. Louis Rams (AP-2); Jimmy Smith, Jacksonville Jaguars (AP-2)
Tight end	Tony Gonzalez, Kansas City Chiefs (AP, PFWA, TSN)	Wesley Walls, Carolina Panthers (AP-2)
Tackle	Tony Boselli, Jacksonville Jaguars (AP, PFWA, TSN); Orlando Pace, St. Louis Rams (AP, PFWA, TSN)	Jon Runyan, Tennessee Titans (AP-2); Jonathan Ogden, Baltimore Ravens (AP-2t); Leon Searcy, Jacksonville Jaguars (AP-2t)
Guard	Larry Allen, Dallas Cowboys (AP, PFWA, TSN); Bruce Matthews, Tennessee Titans (AP, PFWA); Will Shields, Kansas City Chiefs (TSN)	Ruben Brown, Buffalo Bills (AP-2); Tre Johnson, Washington Redskins (AP-2)
Center	Kevin Mawae, New York Jets (AP, TSN-t); Tom Nalen, Denver Broncos (TSN-t); Jeff Christy, Minnesota Vikings (PFWA)	Tom Nalen, Denver Broncos (AP-2)

Special teams
Position	First team	Second team
Kicker	Olindo Mare, Miami Dolphins (AP, PFWA, TSN)	Mike Vanderjagt, Indianapolis Colts (AP-2)
Punter	Mitch Berger, Minnesota Vikings (PFWA, TSN); Tom Tupa, New York Jets (AP)	Mitch Berger, Minnesota Vikings (AP-2)
Kick Returner	Tony Horne, St. Louis Rams (PFWA, TSN); Glyn Milburn, Chicago Bears (AP)	Tony Horne, St. Louis Rams (AP-2)
Punt Returner	Glyn Milburn, Chicago Bears (TSN); Charlie Rogers, Seattle Seahawks (PFWA)	
Special Teams	Michael Bates, Carolina Panthers (PFWA)	

Defense
Position	First team	Second team
Defensive end	Kevin Carter, St. Louis Rams (AP, PFWA, TSN); Jevon Kearse, Tennessee Titans (AP, PFWA, TSN)	Simeon Rice, Tampa Bay Buccaneers (AP-2); Tony Brackens, Jacksonville Jaguars (AP-2)
Defensive tackle	Warren Sapp, Tampa Bay Buccaneers (AP, PFWA, TSN); Darrell Russell, Oakland Raiders (PFWA, TSN); Trevor Pryce, Denver Broncos (AP)	Darrell Russell, Oakland Raiders (AP-2); Bryant Young, San Francisco 49ers (AP-2)
Inside Linebacker	Zach Thomas, Miami Dolphins (AP); Ray Lewis, Baltimore Ravens (AP, PFWA, TSN)	Hardy Nickerson, Tampa Bay Buccaneers (AP-2); Junior Seau, San Diego Chargers (AP-2)
Outside linebacker	Kevin Hardy, Jacksonville Jaguars (AP, PFWA, TSN); Derrick Brooks, Tampa Bay Buccaneers (AP, PFWA, TSN)	Peter Boulware, Baltimore Ravens (AP-2); Jessie Armstead, New York Giants (AP-2)
Cornerback	Sam Madison, Miami Dolphins (AP, PFWA, TSN); Charles Woodson, Oakland Raiders (AP, PFWA); Deion Sanders, Dallas Cowboys (TSN)	Todd Lyght, St. Louis Rams (AP-2); Deion Sanders, Dallas Cowboys (AP-2)
Safety	John Lynch, Tampa Bay Buccaneers (AP, PFWA, TSN); Lawyer Milloy, New England Patriots (AP, TSN); Carnell Lake, Jacksonville Jaguars (PFWA)	Carnell Lake, Jacksonville Jaguars (AP-2); Robert Griffith, Minnesota Vikings (AP-2)

== Key ==
- AP = Associated Press first-team All-Pro
- AP-2 = Associated Press second-team All-Pro
- AP-2t = Tied for second-team All-Pro in the AP vote
- PFWA = Pro Football Writers Association All-NFL
- TSN = The Sporting News All-Pro
