= Justin Watson (running back) =

American football player (born 1975)

No. 36, 33
- Position: Running back

Personal information
- Born: January 7, 1975 (age 51); Bronx, New York, U.S.
- Listed height: 6 ft 0 in (1.83 m)
- Listed weight: 220 lb (100 kg)

Career information
- High school: Marshall (Pasadena, California)
- College: San Diego State (1993–1997)
- NFL draft: 1998: undrafted

Career history
- San Diego Chargers (1998)*; St. Louis Rams (1999–2002)
- * Offseason or practice squad member only

Awards and highlights
- Super Bowl champion (XXXIV)

Career NFL statistics
- Rushing yards: 428
- Rushing average: 4.2
- Receptions: 10
- Receiving yards: 56
- Total touchdowns: 4
- Stats at Pro Football Reference

Justin Watson (born January 7, 1975) is an American former professional football player who played three seasons as a running back for the St. Louis Rams. Watson was recorded on camera during Super Bowl XXXVI saying, "I told you, I like our chances! We are the number one offense in the league. I like our chances,” immediately following a St. Louis Rams game tying touchdown and moments before Tom Brady led the New England Patriots on a game winning drive.
