= Andrew Kline =

American football player (born 1976)

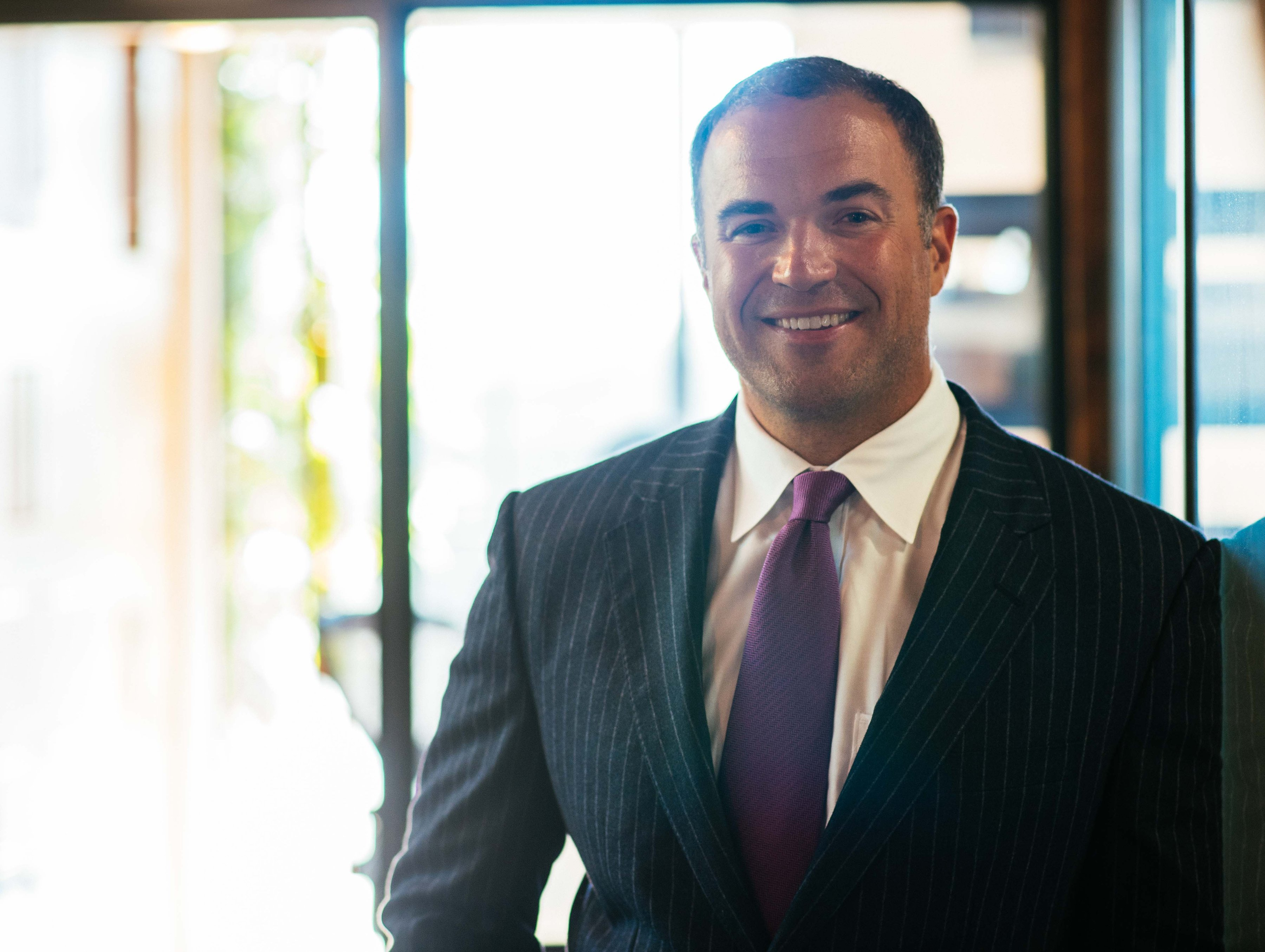

No. 72
- Position: Offensive guard

Personal information
- Born: October 5, 1976 (age 50); Los Angeles, California, U.S.

Career information
- High school: Beverly Hills (CA)
- College: San Diego State (CA)
- NFL draft: 2000: 7th round, 220th overall pick

Career history
- St. Louis Rams (2000)

Awards and highlights
- Second-team All-Mountain West (1999)

Andrew William Kline (born October 5, 1976) is an American former professional football player. Kline was selected by St. Louis Rams in the seventh round of the 2000 NFL draft with the 220th overall pick.

== Early life ==
Andrew attended Beverly Hills High School in Beverly Hills, California, and began playing football in ninth grade. He was a four-year starter at Beverly Hills High and played both offensive and defensive tackle. As a senior, he registered 62 tackles, six sacks, four tackles for loss, five fumbles caused, four fumbles recovered and two pass defections. Top game was against North Torrance High when he notched 14 tackles. He was a First-team All-CIF, All-Ocean League and All-Los Angeles Times West Side selection. Kline was a pre-season All-American candidate. Also competed in track and field as a shot putter and on the Varsity basketball team. Kline was coached and mentored by high-school football coaching legend, Carter Paysinger. Paysinger dedicated a chapter in his New York Times best-selling book, "Where a Man Stands" on Paysinger and Kline's unique journey through adversity together. Kline was named to The Beverly Hills High School Hall of Fame in 2023.

== College career ==
Kline was a 1999 All-Mountain West Conference selection and manned the right guard position on what was considered by many one of the finest offensive lines in San Diego State history. During his senior season, he graded out at 88.6% and made 38 knockdowns and registered 33 other big blocks the most among the team's offensive lineman—and a school record. He helped the offense average 382.4 yards-per-game.

Kline lined up at right guard in 1998, collecting 30 knockdown blocks, the most among the team's offensive lineman. He graded out at 86.1% for the season, giving up 1.5 sacks and six pressures on the year as the offense averaged 186.6 yards-per-game rushing. In 1997, he started seven games, seeing action at quick tackle and strongside guard. In 1996, he saw action with the first and second unit at guard and tackle while also performing on the special teams/kicking units. In 1995, he redshirted as a freshman.

== Professional career ==
Pre-draft measurables
Height	Weight	40-yard dash	10-yard split	20-yard split	20-yard shuttle	Three-cone drill	Vertical jump	Broad jump	Bench press
6 ft 2 1/8 in (1.88 m)	305 lb (138 kg)	5.43 s	1.88 s	3.13 s	4.60 s	7.54 s	28 in (0.71 m)	8 ft 7 in (2.62 m)	26 reps
All from NFL Combine.

Kline was a seventh-round pick of the St. Louis Rams in 2000, and the 220th pick overall. He officially signed with the team on July 7. He was placed on injured reserve on August 22, 2000, and spent the entire season there. Kline was released by the Rams in 2001.

Kline was inducted in to the Jewish Sports Hall of Fame in 2003.
