= Tony Horne =

American football player (born 1976)

No. 82
- Positions: Wide receiver, return specialist

Personal information
- Born: March 21, 1976 (age 50); Queens, New York, U.S.
- Listed height: 5 ft 9 in (1.75 m)
- Listed weight: 190 lb (86 kg)

Career information
- High school: Richmond (Rockingham, North Carolina)
- College: Clemson
- NFL draft: 1998: undrafted

Career history
- St. Louis Rams (1998–2000); Kansas City Chiefs (2001)*
- * Offseason or practice squad member only

Awards and highlights
- Super Bowl champion (XXXIV); First-team All-Pro (PFWA, TSN) Second-team All-Pro (AP) (1999); St. Louis Rams 10th Anniversary Team

Career NFL statistics
- Receptions: 4
- Receiving yards: 32
- Return yards: 3,615
- Total touchdowns: 6
- Stats at Pro Football Reference

Antonio Tremaine Horne (born March 21, 1976) is an American former professional football player who was a wide receiver and return specialist for three seasons with the St. Louis Rams of the National Football League (NFL).

Horne attended Richmond Senior High in Rockingham, North Carolina, where he was a quarterback and a wide receiver.

Horne played college football for the Clemson Tigers. As a senior in 1997, he caught a school record 70 passes for 907 yards and 8 touchdowns, while also returning 32 punts for 332 yards and another score, along with 19 kickoff returns for 536 yards. He finished his four seasons there with 120 receptions for 1,750 yards and 13 touchdowns, as well as 1,133 yards on special teams.

== NFL career ==
Undrafted, Horne played the 1998, 1999, and 2000 seasons with the St. Louis Rams. In 1998, he finished sixth in the NFL with 1,306 yards on kick returns. He added 892 yards in 1999 with a league leading 29.7 yards per return average, and was an important contributor to the Rams 1999 Super Bowl winning team, scoring two kickoff return touchdowns during the season and one more during the playoffs. He gained 1,379 in 11 games in 2000, when he again finished sixth in the league.

In 2001, he signed on as a free agent with the Kansas City Chiefs before suffering a knee injury during that preseason that ended his pro career. He finished his three seasons with 143 kickoff returns for 3,577 yards and 4 touchdowns.

== Post NFL ==
Horne works as a strength and speed coach at D1 Sports Training in Greenville.
