= Jerald Moore =

American football player (born 1974)

Jerald "J-Mo" Moore
No. 44, 32
- Position: Running back

Personal information
- Born: November 20, 1974 (age 51); Houston, Texas, U.S.
- Listed height: 5 ft 9 in (1.75 m)
- Listed weight: 225 lb (102 kg)

Career information
- High school: Yates (Houston, Texas)
- College: Oklahoma
- NFL draft: 1996: 3rd round, 83rd overall pick

Career history
- St. Louis Rams (1996–1998); Oakland Raiders (2000)*; New Orleans Saints (2000)
- * Offseason or practice squad member only

Awards and highlights
- 2× First All-Big Eight (1994, 1995)

Career NFL statistics
- Rushing yards: 705
- Rushing average: 3.4
- Receptions: 20
- Receiving yards: 142
- Total touchdowns: 6
- Stats at Pro Football Reference

Jerald Christopher Moore (born November 20, 1974) is an American former professional football player and feature running back. Moore attended the renowned Jack Yates High School in Houston, Texas, Third Ward. He later matriculated to the University of Oklahoma as the premiere running back in 1993, and was selected 83rd overall in the third round of the 1996 NFL draft. He played four seasons for the New Orleans Saints and St. Louis Rams. Moore was nicknamed "Thunder" for his unique explosive and powerful ability to break tackles and elude defenders. In 2006, His only son Kameron Moore was born and played football following in his fathers footsteps.Kameron now attends the University of Oklahoma following his father's legacy.
