= Tutan Reyes =

American football player (born 1977)

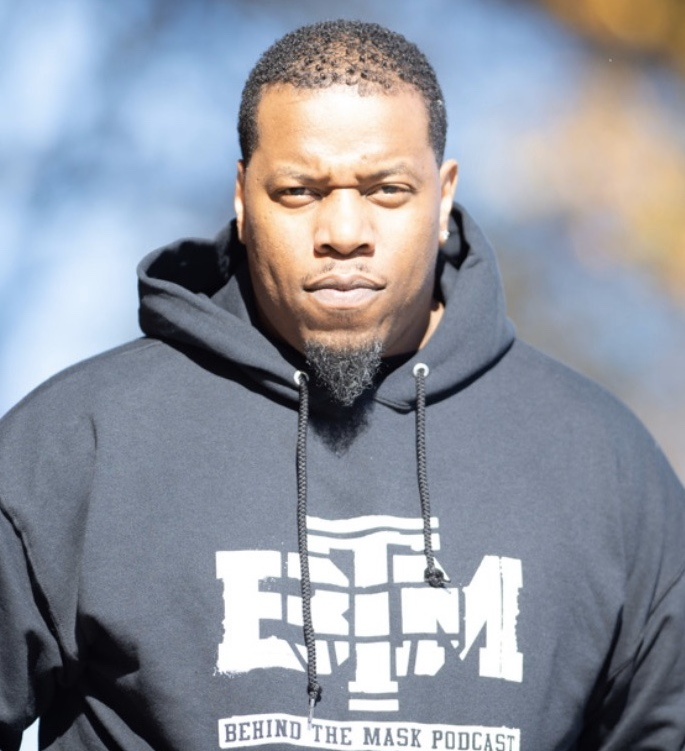
- Reyes in 2019

No. 76, 78
- Position: Guard

Personal information
- Born: October 28, 1977 (age 49); Brooklyn, New York, U.S.
- Listed height: 6 ft 3 in (1.91 m)
- Listed weight: 305 lb (138 kg)

Career information
- High school: August Martin (Queens, New York)
- College: Mississippi
- NFL draft: 2000: 5th round, 131st overall pick

Career history
- New Orleans Saints (2000–2002); Tampa Bay Buccaneers (2002); Carolina Panthers (2002–2005); Buffalo Bills (2006); Jacksonville Jaguars (2007–2008); New York Giants (2009); Houston Texans (2009)

Awards and highlights
- Second-team All-SEC (1999)

Career NFL statistics
- Games played: 53
- Games started: 37
- Fumble recoveries: 1
- Stats at Pro Football Reference

Tutankhamen Marqués Reyes (born October 28, 1977) is an American former professional football player who was a guard in the National Football League (NFL). He played college football for the Ole Miss Rebels and was selected by the New Orleans Saints in the fifth round of the 2000 NFL draft.

He has played for the Carolina Panthers, Buffalo Bills, Jacksonville Jaguars, New York Giants and Houston Texans.

== Early life ==
Reyes attended August Martin High School in Queens, New York and was a standout in football and basketball. In football, he garnered All-Queens honors and was selected to the Coaches All-City Team. As a senior, he posted 18 receptions for 413 yards and five touchdowns as a tight end.

== College career ==
Reyes made 25 starts, including 24 in a row at left tackle, during his final two seasons at Ole Miss. As a senior in 1999, he received Second-team All-Southeastern Conference honors by coaches. Reyes helped the Rebels finish third in the SEC with a 7–4 record and defeat the University of Oklahoma in the Independence Bowl. The Rebels offense ranked second in the SEC with 182.5 rushing yards per game as running back Deuce McAllister led the conference with 169.2 all-purpose yards per game.

== Professional career ==
=== New Orleans Saints ===
Reyes was selected by the New Orleans Saints in the fifth round of the 2000 NFL draft and played for the Saints for two seasons, seeing action in one game. Reyes was ultimately waived early in the 2002 NFL season.

=== Tampa Bay Buccaneers ===
Immediately following his waiver by the Saints, Reyes was claimed off of waivers by the Tampa Bay Buccaneers, and was active on two occasions, but saw no game action before being waived shortly afterwards.

=== Carolina Panthers ===
Subsequent to his waiver by the Buccaneers, Reyes was claimed by the Carolina Panthers, though he saw no regular-season game action in 2002 or 2003. He started 12 games in the 2004 NFL season at right and left guard as part of the Carolina Panthers offensive line that used five different starting combinations. He made his first NFL start at left guard against the Kansas City Chiefs in 2004 and helped clear lanes for running back DeShaun Foster to rush for 174 yards, the fourth-highest total in Panthers history. In 2005, Reyes had his best season as a pro. He started in all 16 regular season games as well as each of the Panthers' three playoff games, contributing to the Panthers' second NFC Championship appearance in a three-year span.

=== Buffalo Bills ===
After the 2005 NFL season, Reyes left the Panthers and signed with the Buffalo Bills. He started the first 6 games of the 2006 season at left guard before suffering a shoulder injury which would end his season.

=== Jacksonville Jaguars ===
On August 19, 2007, Reyes signed with the Jacksonville Jaguars. He saw action in one game that season. In 2008, Reyes started three games among 15 total appearances.

=== New York Giants ===
Reyes signed with his hometown team, the New York Giants on May 21, 2009, but was later waived on September 15.

=== Houston Texans ===
Reyes was signed by the Houston Texans on October 14, 2009, the final team of his 10-year NFL career.
