= 2002 New Orleans Saints season =

NFL team season

- General manager: Mickey Loomis
- Head coach: Jim Haslett
- Home stadium: Louisiana Superdome

Results
- Record: 9–7
- Division place: 3rd NFC South
- Playoffs: Did not qualify
- All-Pros: Deuce McAllister (1st team); Michael Lewis (ST); Fred McAfee (ST)
- Pro Bowlers: Deuce McAllister (RB); Joe Horn (WR); Michael Lewis (KR); Fred McAfee (ST)

The 2002 season was the New Orleans Saints' 36th in the National Football League (NFL), their 27th playing home games at the Louisiana Superdome, and third under head coach Jim Haslett. They improved upon their previous season's performance of 7–9, winning nine games. Despite the winning season, and ranking third in total offense in 2002, the team failed to qualify for the playoffs for the ninth time in the last 10 seasons. This was the first season in which the Saints wore gold jerseys. They did so during a home game against the Minnesota Vikings in week 15. They would not wear them again until the 2025 season

A bright moment during the season for the Saints was sweeping the eventual Super Bowl champion Tampa Bay Buccaneers. Those two wins were almost guaranteed to make New Orleans a playoff team; however, three consecutive losses, all to losing teams, including one to the 1–13 Cincinnati Bengals, knocked New Orleans out of playoff contention.

== Offseason ==
Additions	Subtractions
WR Jerome Pathon (Colts)	RB Ricky Williams (Dolphins)
TE David Sloan (Lions)	T Willie Roaf (Chiefs)
CB Ken Irvin (Bills)	DT La'Roi Glover (Cowboys)
WR Jake Reed (Vikings)	CB Fred Weary (Falcons)
T Victor Riley (Chiefs)	DE Joe Johnson (Packers)
CB Dale Carter (Vikings)	T Daryl Terrell (Jaguars)

=== NFL draft ===
2002 New Orleans Saints draft
Round	Pick	Player	Position	College	Notes
1	13	Donté Stallworth	Wide receiver	Tennessee	
1	25	Charles Grant	Defensive end	Georgia	
2	44	LeCharles Bentley *	Guard	Ohio State	
3	82	James Allen	Linebacker	Oregon State	
4	125	Keyuo Craver	Defensive back	Nebraska	
5	150	Mel Mitchell	Defensive back	Western Kentucky	
6	186	J. T. O'Sullivan	Quarterback	UC Davis	
6	196	John Gilmore	Tight end	Penn State	
7	224	Derrius Monroe	Defensive end	Virginia Tech	
Made roster * Made at least one Pro Bowl during career

=== Undrafted free agents ===
2002 undrafted free agents of note
Player	Position	College
Frank Cutolo	Wide receiver	Eastern Illinois
Todd Elstrom	Wide receiver	Washington
Chonn Lacey	Safety	Temple
Andrew LeClair	Linebacker	North Dakota State
Derrick Lewis	Wide receiver	San Diego State
Jerry Montgomery	Defensive tackle	Iowa
Jeff Reed	Placekicker	North Carolina
Rick Sherrod	Safety	West Virginia
Demetrius Smith	Fullback	Southwest Missouri State

== Personnel ==
=== Staff ===
2002 New Orleans Saints staff
Front office: Owner – Tom Benson; Executive vice president/general manager – Mickey Loomis; Senior football administrator – Russ Ball; Director of player personnel – Rick Mueller; College scouting coordinator – Rick Thompson; Head coaches: Head coach – Jim Haslett; Assistant head coach/secondary – Mike Riley; Offensive coaches: Offensive coordinator – Mike McCarthy; Quarterbacks – Mike Sheppard; Running backs – Dave Atkins; Wide receivers – Hubbard Alexander; Assistant wide receivers – Jim Hostler; Tight ends – Bob Palcic; Offensive line – Jack Henry; Offensive assistant/quality control – Danny Langsdorf	Defensive coaches: Defensive coordinator – Rick Venturi; Defensive line – Sam Clancy; Linebackers – Winston Moss; Assistant secondary – Joe Baker; Defensive assistant/quality control – Greg Brown; Special teams coaches: Special teams – Al Everest; Strength and conditioning: Strength and conditioning – Rock Gullickson; Assistant strength and conditioning – Evan Marcus

=== Roster ===
2002 New Orleans Saints roster
Quarterbacks (QB): 2 Aaron Brooks; 12 Jake Delhomme; 14 J. T. O'Sullivan; Running backs (RB): 48 James Fenderson; 28 Curtis Keaton; 25 Fred McAfee; 26 Deuce McAllister; 44 Terrelle Smith FB; Wide receivers (WR): 87 Joe Horn; 89 Derrick Lewis; 84 Michael Lewis; 80 Jerome Pathon; 86 Jake Reed; 83 Donté Stallworth; Tight ends (TE): 81 Lamont Hall; 88 David Sloan; 82 Boo Williams	Offensive linemen (OL): 65 LeCharles Bentley G; 71 Spencer Folau G/T; 62 Jerry Fontenot C; 64 Kendyl Jacox G; 67 Bubba Miller C/G; 66 Victor Riley T; 74 Scott Sanderson T; 68 Kyle Turley T; 63 Wally Williams G; Defensive linemen (DL): 92 Martin Chase DT; 94 Charles Grant DE; 99 Norman Hand DT; 93 Darren Howard DE; 91 Grady Jackson DT; 90 Kenny Smith DT; 98 Willie Whitehead DE	Linebackers (LB): 50 James Allen OLB; 55 Travis Carroll OLB; 56 Charlie Clemons MLB; 51 Bryan Cox MLB; 52 Sedrick Hodge OLB; 59 J. J. Jones OLB; 53 Roger Knight OLB; 54 Darrin Smith OLB; Defensive backs (DB): 20 Jay Bellamy FS; 35 Fakhir Brown CB; 21 Dale Carter CB; 43 Keyuo Craver CB; 37 Steve Gleason SS; 27 Ken Irvin CB; 29 Sammy Knight SS; 40 Mel Mitchell FS; 22 Fred Thomas CB; Special teams (ST): 3 John Carney K; 4 Toby Gowin P; 47 Kevin Houser LS	Practice squad: 78 P. J. Alexander G; 30 Corey Hall S; 77 Abdul-Salaam Noah DT; 34 Demetrius Smith FB; Reserve: 36 Michael Hawthorne CB (IR); 57 Curtis Holden LB (IR); Rookies in italics 53 active, 2 reserve, 4 practice squad

== Regular season ==
=== Schedule ===
Under the NFL's new scheduling formula, the Saints' non-divisional conference opponents in 2002 were primarily from the NFC North, although they also played former divisional rival the San Francisco 49ers from the NFC West, and the Washington Redskins from the NFC East. Their non-conference opponents were from the AFC North.

Week	Date	Opponent	Result	Record	Venue	Attendance
1	September 8	at Tampa Bay Buccaneers	W 26–20 (OT)	1–0	Raymond James Stadium	65,554
2	September 15	Green Bay Packers	W 35–20	2–0	Louisiana Superdome	67,958
3	September 22	at Chicago Bears	W 29–23	3–0	Memorial Stadium	63,216
4	September 29	at Detroit Lions	L 21–26	3–1	Ford Field	60,023
5	October 6	Pittsburgh Steelers	W 32–29	4–1	Louisiana Superdome	67,734
6	October 13	at Washington Redskins	W 43–27	5–1	FedExField	80,768
7	October 20	San Francisco 49ers	W 35–27	6–1	Louisiana Superdome	67,903
8	October 27	Atlanta Falcons	L 35–37	6–2	Louisiana Superdome	67,883
9	Bye					
10	November 10	at Carolina Panthers	W 34–24	7–2	Ericsson Stadium	72,566
11	November 17	at Atlanta Falcons	L 17–24	7–3	Georgia Dome	70,382
12	November 24	Cleveland Browns	L 15–24	7–4	Louisiana Superdome	68,295
13	December 1	Tampa Bay Buccaneers	W 23–20	8–4	Louisiana Superdome	68,226
14	December 8	at Baltimore Ravens	W 37–25	9–4	Ravens Stadium	69,334
15	December 15	Minnesota Vikings	L 31–32	9–5	Louisiana Superdome	67,851
16	December 22	at Cincinnati Bengals	L 13–20	9–6	Paul Brown Stadium	43,544
17	December 29	Carolina Panthers	L 6–10	9–7	Louisiana Superdome	66,946

=== Game summaries ===
==== Week 2: vs. Green Bay Packers ====
Week 2: Green Bay Packers at New Orleans Saints

Quarter	1	2	3	4	Total
Packers	0	10	7	3	20
Saints	7	14	7	7	35

at Louisiana Superdome, New Orleans, Louisiana

- Date: September 15, 2002
- Game time: 1:00 pm
- Game weather: Partly Cloudy, 88 °F (31 °C)
- Game attendance: 67,958
- Referee: Johnny Grier (23)
- TV announcers (FOX): Dick Stockton, Daryl Johnston, Ron Pitts
- Recap, Game Book

Game information

First quarter

- NO – Deuce McAllister 4-yard run (John Carney kick), 9:19. Saints 7–0. Drive: 11 plays, 68 yards, 5:41.

Second quarter

- GB – Ryan Longwell 27-yard field goal, 10:23. Saints 7–3. Drive: 15 plays, 71 yards, 7:31.
- NO – Jerome Pathon 5-yard pass from Aaron Brooks (John Carney kick), 5:12. Saints 14–3. Drive: 5 plays, 21 yards, 2:53.
- NO – Donte Stallworth 34-yard pass from Aaron Brooks (John Carney kick), 2:03. Saints 21–3. Drive: 4 plays, 52 yards, 1:16.
- GB – Terry Glenn 14-yard pass from Brett Favre (Ryan Longwell kick), 0:40. Saints 21–10. Drive: 1 play, 14 yards, 0:08.

Third quarter

- NO – Keyuo Craver 28-yard fumble return (John Carney kick), 13:53. Saints 28–10.
- GB – Donald Driver 26-yard pass from Brett Favre (Ryan Longwell kick), 0:31. Saints 28–17. Drive: 6 plays, 71 yards, 2:31.

Fourth quarter

- GB – Ryan Longwell 36-yard field goal, 4:31. Saints 28–20. Drive: 12 plays, 61 yards, 6:03.
- NO – Deuce McAllister 2-yard run (John Carney kick), 2:00. Saints 35–20. Drive: 4 plays, 73 yards, 2:31.

Top passers

- GB – Brett Favre – 29/44, 270 yards, 2 TD, INT
- NO – Aaron Brooks – 16/28, 217 yards, 2 TD, 2 INT

Top rushers

- GB – Ahman Green – 17 rushes, 81 yards
- NO – Deuce McAllister – 21 rushes, 123 yards, 2 TD

Top receivers

- GB – Terry Glenn – 9 receptions, 81 yards, TD
- NO – Joe Horn – 6 receptions, 120 yards

==== Week 3: at Chicago Bears ====
Week 3: New Orleans Saints (2–0) at Chicago Bears (2–0) – Game summary

Quarter	1	2	3	4	Total
Saints	0	14	7	8	29
Bears	10	10	0	3	23

at Memorial Stadium, Champaign, Illinois

- Date: September 22, 2002
- Game time: 1:00 p.m.
- Game weather: Partly Cloudy, 68 °F (20 °C)
- Game attendance: 63,216
- Referee: Ron Blum (7)
- TV announcers (FOX): Kenny Albert, Tim Green, Dan Jiggets
- Recap, Game Book

Game information

First quarter

- CHI – Paul Edinger 31-yard field goal, 7:36. Bears 3–0. Drive: 10 plays, 38 yards, 4:01.
- CHI – Dez White 10-yard pass from Jim Miller (Paul Edinger kick), 2:47. Bears 10–0. Drive: 6 plays, 52 yards, 3:10.

Second quarter

- CHI – Marty Booker 22-yard pass from Jim Miller (Paul Edinger kick), 13:35. Bears 17–0. Drive: 6 plays, 56 yards, 3:05.
- CHI – Paul Edinger 25-yard field goal, 11:47. Bears 20–0. Drive: 4 plays, 6 yards, 1:30.
- NO – Jerome Pathon 16-yard pass from Aaron Brooks (John Carney kick), 7:21. Bears 20–7. Drive: 8 plays, 84 yards, 4:26.
- NO – Aaron Brooks 7-yard run (John Carney kick), 6:23. Bears 20–14. Drive: 2 plays, 8 yards, 0:58.

Third quarter

- NO – Joe Horn 5-yard pass from Aaron Brooks (John Carney kick), 8:15. Saints 21–20. Drive: 12 plays, 65 yards, 6:45.

Fourth quarter

- CHI – Paul Edinger 25-yard field goal, 8:43. Bears 23–21. Drive: 11 plays, 70 yards, 5:59.
- NO – Donte Stallworth 29-yard pass from Aaron Brooks (Aaron Brooks run), 1:11. Saints 29–23. Drive: 7 plays, 73 yards, 2:01.

Top passers

- NO – Aaron Brooks – 22/34, 233 yards, 3 TD, INT
- CHI – Jim Miller – 26/40, 236 yards, 2 TD, INT

Top rushers

- NO – Deuce McAllister – 17 rushes, 45 yards
- CHI – Anthony Thomas – 27 rushes, 111 yards

Top receivers

- NO – Jerome Pathon – 5 receptions, 71 yards, TD
- CHI – Marty Booker – 8 receptions, 97 yards, TD

==== Week 4: at Detroit Lions ====
Week 4: New Orleans Saints at Detroit Lions

Quarter	1	2	3	4	Total
Saints	0	7	8	6	21
Lions	13	7	3	3	26

at Ford Field, Detroit, Michigan

- Date: September 29, 2002
- Game time: 1:03 pm
- Game weather: None (indoor stadium)
- Game attendance: 60,023
- Referee: Ron Winter (14)
- TV announcers (Fox): Curt Menefee, Tim Ryan, Jennifer Hammond
- Recap, Game Book

Game information

First quarter

- DET – Jason Hanson 23-yard field goal, 12:03. Lions 3–0. Drive: 6 plays, 17 yards, 2:57.
- DET – James Hall 22-yard fumble return (Jason Hanson kick), 10:31. Lions 10–0.
- DET – Jason Hanson 34-yard field goal, 5:41. Lions 13–0. Drive: 7 plays, 36 yards, 3:42.

Second quarter

- DET – Bill Schroeder 38-yard pass from Joey Harrington (Jason Hanson kick), 4:53. Lions 20–0. Drive: 3 plays, 80 yards, 1:30.
- NO – Donte Stallworth 4-yard pass from Aaron Brooks (John Carney kick), 1:25. Lions 20–7. Drive: 12 plays, 91 yards, 3:28.

Third quarter

- DET – Jason Hanson 23-yard field goal, 7:24. Lions 23–7. Drive: 7 plays, 36 yards, 2:27.
- NO – Deuce McAllister 12-yard run (Aaron Brooks run), 3:41. Lions 23–15. Drive: 7 plays, 72 yards, 3:43.

Fourth quarter

- DET – Jason Hanson 38-yard field goal, 11:47. Lions 26–15. Drive: 7 plays, 17 yards, 2:58.
- NO – Jerome Pathon 6-yard pass from Aaron Brooks (Run Failed), 3:41. Lions 26–21. Drive: 9 plays, 82 yards, 2:22.

Top passers

- NO – Aaron Brooks – 27/48, 269 yards, 2 TD, 2 INT
- DET – Joey Harrington – 20/35, 267 yards, TD

Top rushers

- NO – Deuce McAllister – 12 rushes, 61 yards, TD
- DET – James Stewart – 18 rushes, 65 yards

Top receivers

- NO – Joe Horn – 6 receptions, 87 yards
- DET – Az-Zahir Hakim – 3 receptions, 98 yards

==== Week 15: vs. Minnesota Vikings ====
Week 15: Minnesota Vikings (3–10) at New Orleans Saints (9–4) – Game summary

Quarter	1	2	3	4	Total
Vikings	14	10	0	8	32
Saints	10	10	3	8	31

at Louisiana Superdome, New Orleans, Louisiana

- Date: December 15, 2002
- Game time: 12:00 p.m. CDT
- Game weather: None (indoor stadium)
- Game attendance: 67,851
- Referee: Bob McElwee (95)
- TV announcers (FOX): Ron Pitts, John Jurkovic, Joe Trahan
- Recap, Game Book

Game information

First quarter

- NO – John Carney 40-yard field goal, 11:50. Saints 3–0. Drive: 5 plays, 17 yards, 3:10.
- MIN – Daunte Culpepper 4-yard run (Gary Anderson kick), 8:21. Vikings 7–3. Drive: 6 plays, 69 yards, 3:29.
- MIN – Daunte Culpepper 6-yard run (Gary Anderson kick), 1:01. Vikings 14–3. Drive: 11 plays, 71 yards, 5:42.
- NO – Michael Lewis 97-yard kickoff return (John Carney kick), 0:48. Vikings 14–10. Drive: 0 plays, 0 yards, 0:13.

Second quarter

- MIN – Gary Anderson 41-yard field goal, 11:59. Vikings 17–10. Drive: 9 plays, 57 yards, 3:49.
- NO – John Carney 34-yard field goal, 5:25. Vikings 17–13. Drive: 12 plays, 44 yards, 6:34.
- NO – Jake Reed 35-yard pass from Aaron Brooks (John Carney kick), 0:53. Saints 20–17. Drive: 8 plays, 65 yards, 1:28.
- MIN – Randy Moss 33-yard pass from Daunte Culpepper (Gary Anderson kick), 0:12. Vikings 24–20. Drive: 5 plays, 80 yards, 0:41.

Third quarter

- NO – John Carney 27-yard field goal, 0:55. Vikings 24–23. Drive: 14 plays, 75 yards, 8:06.

Fourth quarter

- NO – Deuce McAllister 17-yard pass from Aaron Brooks (Aaron Brooks–Joe Horn pass), 5:21. Saints 31–24. Drive: 9 plays, 74 yards, 4:35.
- MIN – Randy Moss 13-yard pass from Daunte Culpepper (Daunte Culpepper run), 0:05. Vikings 32–31. Drive: 13 plays, 73 yards, 5:16.

Top passers

- MIN – Daunte Culpepper – 26/36, 312 yards, 2 TD
- NO – Aaron Brooks – 21/33, 255 yards, 2 TD

Top rushers

- MIN – Daunte Culpepper – 7 rushes, 73 yards, 2 TD
- NO – Deuce McAllister – 18 rushes, 69 yards

Top receivers

- MIN – Randy Moss – 11 receptions, 113 yards, 2 TD
- NO – Joe Horn – 5 receptions, 60 yards

=== Standings ===
==== Division ====
NFC South
	W	L	T	PCT	DIV	CONF	PF	PA	STK
^{(2)} Tampa Bay Buccaneers	12	4	0	.750	4–2	9–3	346	196	W1
^{(6)} Atlanta Falcons	9	6	1	.594	4–2	7–5	402	314	L1
New Orleans Saints	9	7	0	.563	3–3	7–5	432	388	L3
Carolina Panthers	7	9	0	.438	1–5	4–8	258	302	W2

==== Conference ====
NFC
#	Team	Division	W	L	T	PCT	DIV	CONF	SOS	SOV
Division leaders
1 (Note: Philadelphia finished ahead of Tampa Bay and Green Bay based on conference record (11–1 vs 9–3/9–3).)	Philadelphia Eagles	East	12	4	0	.750	5–1	11–1	.469	.432
2 (Note: Tampa Bay finished ahead of Green Bay based on head-to-head victory.)	Tampa Bay Buccaneers	South	12	4	0	.750	4–2	9–3	.482	.432
3	Green Bay Packers	North	12	4	0	.750	5–1	9–3	.451	.414
4	San Francisco 49ers	West	10	6	0	.625	5–1	8–4	.504	.450
Wild Cards
5	New York Giants	East	10	6	0	.625	5–1	8–4	.482	.450
6	Atlanta Falcons	South	9	6	1	.594	4–2	7–5	.494	.429
Did not qualify for the postseason
7	New Orleans Saints	South	9	7	0	.563	3–3	7–5	.498	.566
8 (Note: St. Louis finished ahead of Seattle based on division record (4–2 to 2–4).)	St. Louis Rams	West	7	9	0	.438	4–2	5–7	.508	.446
9	Seattle Seahawks	West	7	9	0	.438	2–4	5–7	.506	.433
10 (Note: Washington finished ahead of Carolina based on common games (2–3 to 1–4))	Washington Redskins	East	7	9	0	.438	1–5	4–8	.527	.438
11	Carolina Panthers	South	7	9	0	.438	1–5	4–8	.486	.357
12	Minnesota Vikings	North	6	10	0	.375	4–2	5–7	.498	.417
13 (Note: Arizona finished ahead of Dallas based on head-to-head victory.)	Arizona Cardinals	West	5	11	0	.313	1–5	5–7	.500	.400
14	Dallas Cowboys	East	5	11	0	.313	1–5	3–9	.500	.475
15	Chicago Bears	North	4	12	0	.250	2–4	3–9	.521	.430
16	Detroit Lions	North	3	13	0	.188	1–5	3–9	.494	.375
Tiebreakers (Note: When breaking ties for three or more teams under the NFL's rules, they are first broken within divisions, then comparing only the highest-ranked remaining team from each division.)
