= 2005 New Orleans Saints season =

NFL team season

- General manager: Mickey Loomis
- Head coach: Jim Haslett
- Home stadium: Louisiana Superdome (Preseason); Alamodome, San Antonio, Texas (Note: Due to Hurricane Katrina striking New Orleans, causing the Louisiana Superdome to be damaged, the Saints had to play their home games for the rest of this season in these stadiums.); Giants Stadium, East Rutherford, New Jersey; Tiger Stadium, Baton Rouge, Louisiana

Results
- Record: 3–13
- Division place: 4th NFC South
- Playoffs: Did not qualify
- Pro Bowlers: C LeCharles Bentley

The 2005 season was the New Orleans Saints' 39th in the National Football League (NFL) and the sixth and final under head coach Jim Haslett.

The season began with the team trying to improve from their 8–8 record from 2004. The Saints played two preseason games in the Louisiana Superdome before being forced to evacuate New Orleans due to Hurricane Katrina. They were forced to play the rest of the season on the road, splitting their games between their temporary headquarters at San Antonio’s Alamodome, and LSU’s Tiger Stadium in Baton Rouge, and even playing their first home game at Giants Stadium.

The season ended with a 3–13 record, their equal-worst record alongside 1996 and 1999 since their 1–15 1980 season, and the firing of Jim Haslett. He was replaced by Sean Payton the following season.

This was also Aaron Brooks' last season as the Saints' quarterback, as he was released during the offseason and replaced by future hall of famer Drew Brees in the same season Sean Payton was hired.

== Offseason ==
=== NFL draft ===
2005 New Orleans Saints draft
Round	Pick	Player	Position	College	Notes
1	13	Jammal Brown *	Offensive tackle	Oklahoma	
2	40	Josh Bullocks	Free Safety	Nebraska	
3	82	Alfred Fincher	Linebacker	Connecticut	
4	118	Chase Lyman	Wide receiver	California	
5	152	Adrian McPherson	Quarterback	Florida State	
6	193	Jason Jefferson	Defensive tackle	Wisconsin	
7	232	Jimmy Verdon	Defensive end	Arizona State	
Made roster * Made at least one Pro Bowl during career

== Personnel ==
=== Staff ===
2005 New Orleans Saints staff
Front office: Owner – Tom Benson; Executive vice president/general manager – Mickey Loomis; Senior football administrator – Russ Ball; Director of player personnel – Rick Mueller; Director of college scouting – Rick Reiprish; College scouting coordinator – Rick Thompson; Head coaches: Head coach – Jim Haslett; Associate head coach/running game coordinator – Jack Henry; Offensive coaches: Offensive coordinator – Mike Sheppard; Quarterbacks – Turk Schonert; Running backs – Johnny Roland; Wide receivers – Jimmy Robinson; Tight ends – Bob Palcic; Assistant offensive line – Jim Pyne; Offensive assistant/quality control – Chip Beake	Defensive coaches: Defensive coordinator – Rick Venturi; Defensive line – John Pease; Linebackers – Winston Moss; Senior defensive assistant/secondary – Willy Robinson; Defensive assistant/cornerbacks – Greg Brown; Defensive assistant/quality control – Ty Knott; Defensive assistant/special projects – Joe Alley; Special teams coaches: Special teams coordinator – Al Everest; Strength and conditioning: Strength and conditioning – Rock Gullickson; Assistant strength and conditioning – Adam Bailey

=== Roster ===
2005 New Orleans Saints roster
Quarterbacks (QB): 4 Todd Bouman; 2 Aaron Brooks; 5 Adrian McPherson; Running backs (RB): 44 Mike Karney FB; 25 Fred McAfee; 32 Antowain Smith; 27 Aaron Stecker; 28 Anthony Thomas; Wide receivers (WR): 81 Az-Zahir Hakim; 19 Devery Henderson; 87 Joe Horn; 83 Donté Stallworth; Tight ends (TE): 89 Lamont Hall; 86 Zach Hilton; 82 Nate Lawrie; 80 Shad Meier	Offensive linemen (OL): 60 Ben Archibald OT; 70 Jammal Brown OT; 72 Wayne Gandy OT; 61 Montrae Holland G; 64 Kendyl Jacox C; 75 Jermane Mayberry G; 67 Jamar Nesbit G; 63 Chad Setterstrom G; Defensive linemen (DL): 92 Tony Bryant DE; 94 Charles Grant DE; 93 Darren Howard DE; 77 Rodney Leisle DT; 91 Will Smith DE; 97 Johnathan Sullivan DT; 79 Jimmy Verdon DE; 98 Willie Whitehead DT; 95 Cedric Woodard DT; 66 Brian Young DT	Linebackers (LB): 57 Colby Bockwoldt OLB; 56 Alfred Fincher MLB; 52 Sedrick Hodge OLB; 59 Ronald McKinnon MLB; 51 Terrence Melton OLB; 53 T. J. Slaughter OLB; Defensive backs (DB): 23 Fred Booker CB; 35 Fakhir Brown CB; 29 Josh Bullocks FS; 21 Jason Craft CB; 37 Steve Gleason SS; 34 Mike McKenzie CB; 40 Mel Mitchell SS; 24 Dwight Smith SS; 22 Fred Thomas CB; 33 Joey Thomas CB; Special teams (ST): 17 Mitch Berger P; 3 John Carney K; 47 Kevin Houser LS	Practice squad: 13 Josh Davis WR; 74 Augie Hoffmann G; 45 Keith Joseph RB; 16 Lance Moore WR; 76 Russell Rabe OLB; 46 Nate Schurman FB; 14 Levon Thomas WR; Reserve: 50 James Allen OLB (IR); 20 Jay Bellamy S (IR); 65 LeCharles Bentley C (IR); 85 Ernie Conwell TE (IR); 84 Michael Lewis WR (IR); 15 Chase Lyman WR (IR); 26 Deuce McAllister RB (IR); 88 Nate Poole WR (IR); 78 Jon Stinchcomb OT (IR); 55 Courtney Watson OLB (IR); -- Boo Williams TE (IR); Rookies in italics 53 active, 11 reserve, 7 practice squad

== Preseason ==
Week	Date	Opponent	Result	Record	Game site	Recap
1	August 12	Seattle Seahawks	L 15–34	0–1	Louisiana Superdome	Recap
2	August 18	at New England Patriots	W 37–27	1–1	Gillette Stadium	Recap
3	August 26	Baltimore Ravens	L 6–21	1–2	Louisiana Superdome	Recap
4	September 1	at Oakland Raiders	L 6–13	1–3	McAfee Coliseum	Recap

== Regular season ==
=== Schedule ===
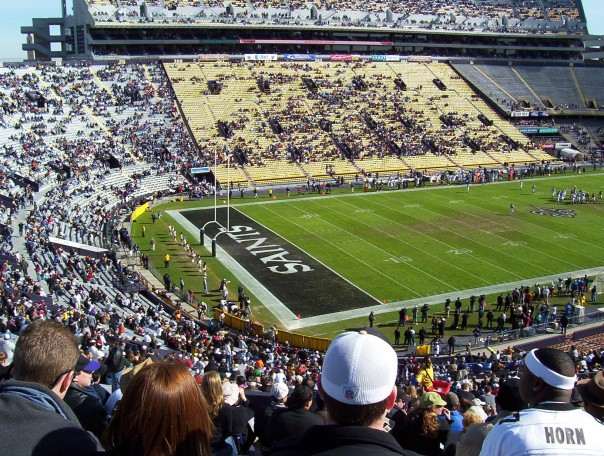
Louisiana State's Tiger Stadium during one of the Saints' home games in 2005

Week	Date	Opponent	Result	Record	Game site	Recap
1	September 11	at Carolina Panthers	W 23–20	1–0	Bank of America Stadium	Recap
2	September 19	New York Giants	L 10–27	1–1	Giants Stadium	Recap
3	September 25	at Minnesota Vikings	L 16–33	1–2	Hubert H. Humphrey Metrodome	Recap
4	October 2	Buffalo Bills	W 19–7	2–2	Alamodome	Recap
5	October 9	at Green Bay Packers	L 3–52	2–3	Lambeau Field	Recap
6	October 16	Atlanta Falcons	L 31–34	2–4	Alamodome	Recap
7	October 23	at St. Louis Rams	L 17–28	2–5	Edward Jones Dome	Recap
8	October 30	Miami Dolphins	L 6–21	2–6	Tiger Stadium	Recap
9	November 6	Chicago Bears	L 17–20	2–7	Tiger Stadium	Recap
10	Bye					
11	November 20	at New England Patriots	L 17–24	2–8	Gillette Stadium	Recap
12	November 27	at New York Jets	W 21–19	3–8	Giants Stadium	Recap
13	December 4	Tampa Bay Buccaneers	L 3–10	3–9	Tiger Stadium	Recap
14	December 12	at Atlanta Falcons	L 17–36	3–10	Georgia Dome	Recap
15	December 18	Carolina Panthers	L 10–27	3–11	Tiger Stadium	Recap
16	December 24	Detroit Lions	L 12–13	3–12	Alamodome	Recap
17	January 1	at Tampa Bay Buccaneers	L 13–27	3–13	Raymond James Stadium	Recap

=== Game summaries ===
==== Week 1: at Carolina Panthers ====
Week 1: New Orleans Saints at Carolina Panthers – Game summary

Quarter	1	2	3	4	Total
Saints	7	7	3	6	23
Panthers	7	0	7	6	20

at Bank of America Stadium, Charlotte, North Carolina

- Date: September 11
- Game time: 12:00 p.m. CDT/1:00 p.m. EDT
- Game weather: Sunny, 79 °F (26 °C)
- Game attendance: 72,920
- Referee: Tom White
- TV announcers (FOX): Ron Pitts, Tim Ryan, Pam Oliver
- Recap

Game information

First quarter

- NO – Deuce McAllister 4-yard run (John Carney kick), 5:23. Saints 7–0. Drive: 17 plays, 80 yards, 9:37.
- CAR – Steve Smith Sr. 33-yard pass from Jake Delhomme (John Kasay kick), 0:37. Tied 7–7. Drive: 11 plays, 93 yards, 4:46.

Second quarter

- NO – Deuce McAllister 2-yard run (John Carney kick), 4:37. Saints 14–7. Drive: 11 plays, 40 yards, 5:46.

Third quarter

- NO – John Carney 29-yard field goal, 4:31. Saints 17–7. Drive: 7 plays, 17 yards, 3:26.
- CAR – Stephen Davis 1-yard run (John Kasay kick), 0:21. Saints 17–14. Drive: 12 plays, 63 yards, 4:10.

Fourth quarter

- NO – John Carney 48-yard field goal, 11:56. Saints 20–14. Drive: 9 plays, 38 yards, 3:25.
- CAR – John Kasay 39-yard field goal, 6:17. Saints 20–17. Drive: 14 plays, 73 yards, 5:39.
- CAR – John Kasay 46-yard field goal, 1:04. Tied 20–20. Drive: 9 plays, 41 yards, 1:55.
- NO – John Carney 47-yard field goal, 0:03. Saints 23–20. Drive: 8 plays, 44 yards, 1:01.

Top passers

- NO – Aaron Brooks – 18/24, 192 yards
- CAR – Jake Delhomme – 19/31, 212 yards, TD, 2 INT

Top rushers

- NO – Deuce McAllister – 26 rushes, 64 yards, 2 TD
- CAR – Stephen Davis – 13 rushes, 81 yards, TD

Top receivers

- NO – Ernie Conwell – 6 receptions, 71 yards
- CAR – Steve Smith Sr. – 8 receptions, 138 yards, TD

==== Week 2: vs. New York Giants ====
Week 2: New York Giants at New Orleans Saints – Game summary

Quarter	1	2	3	4	Total
Giants	14	7	3	3	27
Saints	0	10	0	0	10

at Giants Stadium, East Rutherford, New Jersey

- Date: September 19
- Game time: 7:30 p.m. EDT
- Game weather: Partly cloudy, 77 °F (25 °C)
- Game attendance: 68,031
- Referee: Ed Hochuli
- TV announcers (ABC): Mike Patrick, Paul Maguire, Joe Theismann, Suzy Kolber
- Recap

Game information

First quarter

- NYG – Brandon Jacobs 1-yard run (Jay Feely kick), 13:25. Giants 7–0. Drive: 4 plays, 10 yards, 1:28.
- NYG – Tiki Barber 6-yard pass from Eli Manning (Jay Feely kick), 4:13. Giants 14–0. Drive: 13 plays, 86 yards, 5:55.

Second quarter

- NO – Joe Horn 21-yard pass from Aaron Brooks (John Carney kick), 14:11. Giants 14–7. Drive: 11 plays, 76 yards, 5:02.
- NYG – Tiki Barber 12-yard run (Jay Feely kick), 1:54. Giants 21–7. Drive: 6 plays, 36 yards, 1:33.
- NO – John Carney 21-yard field goal, 0:05. Giants 21–10. Drive: 9 plays, 24 yards, 1:10.

Third quarter

- NYG – Jay Feely 39-yard field goal, 7:48. Giants 24–10. Drive: 6 plays, 15 yards, 2:36.

Fourth quarter

- NYG – Jay Feely 30-yard field goal, 6:37. Giants 27–10. Drive: 16 plays, 74 yards, 6:47.

Top passers

- NYG – Eli Manning – 13/24, 165 yards, TD
- NO – Aaron Brooks – 27/45, 375 yards, TD, 3 INT

Top rushers

- NYG – Tiki Barber – 22 rushes, 83 yards, TD
- NO – Deuce McAllister – 15 rushes, 47 yards

Top receivers

- NYG – Plaxico Burress – 5 receptions, 64 yards
- NO – Joe Horn – 9 receptions, 143 yards, TD

Despite being played at Giants Stadium, this was officially a home game for the Saints as the Louisiana Superdome was being used as an emergency shelter in the aftermath of Hurricane Katrina.

The Saints out gained the Giants, finishing the game with 422 yards of total offense compared to New York's 257. However, the Saints' offense also committed six turnovers that resulted in 17 points for the Giants.

==== Week 3: at Minnesota Vikings ====
Week 3: New Orleans Saints at Minnesota Vikings – Game summary

Quarter	1	2	3	4	Total
Saints	0	6	3	7	16
Vikings	17	7	0	9	33

at Hubert H. Humphrey Metrodome, Minneapolis, Minnesota

- Date: September 25
- Game time: 12:00 p.m. CDT
- Game weather: None (played indoors)
- Game attendance: 63,952
- Referee: Pete Morelli
- TV announcers (Fox): Ron Pitts and Tim Ryan

==== Week 4: vs. Buffalo Bills ====
Week 4: Buffalo Bills at New Orleans Saints – Game summary

Quarter	1	2	3	4	Total
Bills	7	0	0	0	7
Saints	0	13	0	6	19

at Alamodome, San Antonio, Texas

- Date: October 2
- Game time: 12:00 p.m. CDT
- Game weather: None (played indoors)
- Game attendance: 58,688
- Referee: Bill Vinovich
- TV announcers (CBS): Don Criqui, Rich Gannon

==== Week 5: at Green Bay Packers ====
Week 5: New Orleans Saints at Green Bay Packers – Game summary

Quarter	1	2	3	4	Total
Saints	3	0	0	0	3
Packers	14	21	10	7	52

at Lambeau Field, Green Bay, Wisconsin

- Date: October 9
- Game time: 12:00 p.m. CDT
- Game weather: Partly cloudy, 52 °F (11 °C)
- Game attendance: 70,580
- Referee: Tony Corrente
- TV announcers (Fox): Kenny Albert, Brian Baldinger, and Drew Smith

==== Week 6: vs. Atlanta Falcons ====
Week 6: Atlanta Falcons at New Orleans Saints – Game summary

Quarter	1	2	3	4	Total
Falcons	3	14	0	17	34
Saints	7	3	7	14	31

at Alamodome, San Antonio, Texas

- Date: October 16
- Game time: 12:00 p.m. CDT
- Game weather: None (played indoors)
- Game attendance: 65,562
- Referee: Bill Carollo

==== Week 7: at St. Louis Rams ====
Week 7: New Orleans Saints at St. Louis Rams – Game summary

Quarter	1	2	3	4	Total
Saints	14	0	0	3	17
Rams	0	7	0	21	28

at Edward Jones Dome, St. Louis, Missouri

- Date: October 23
- Game time: 12:00 p.m. CDT
- Game weather: None (played indoors)
- Game attendance: 64,586
- Referee: Mike Carey

==== Week 8: vs. Miami Dolphins ====
Week 8: Miami Dolphins at New Orleans Saints – Game summary

Quarter	1	2	3	4	Total
Dolphins	3	6	2	10	21
Saints	3	0	3	0	6

at Tiger Stadium, Baton Rouge, Louisiana

- Date: October 30
- Game time: 3:05 p.m. CDT
- Game weather: Mostly sunny, 76 °F (24 °C)
- Game attendance: 61,643
- Referee: Tom White
- TV announcers (CBS): Gus Johnson, Steve Tasker

==== Week 9: vs. Chicago Bears ====
Week 9: Chicago Bears at New Orleans Saints – Game summary

Quarter	1	2	3	4	Total
Bears	7	3	7	3	20
Saints	3	7	0	7	17

at Tiger Stadium, Baton Rouge, Louisiana

- Date: November 6
- Game time: 3:05 p.m. CST
- Game weather: Cloudy, 85 °F (29 °C)
- Game attendance: 32,637
- Referee: Bill Leavy
- TV announcers (Fox): Kenny Albert and Brian Baldinger

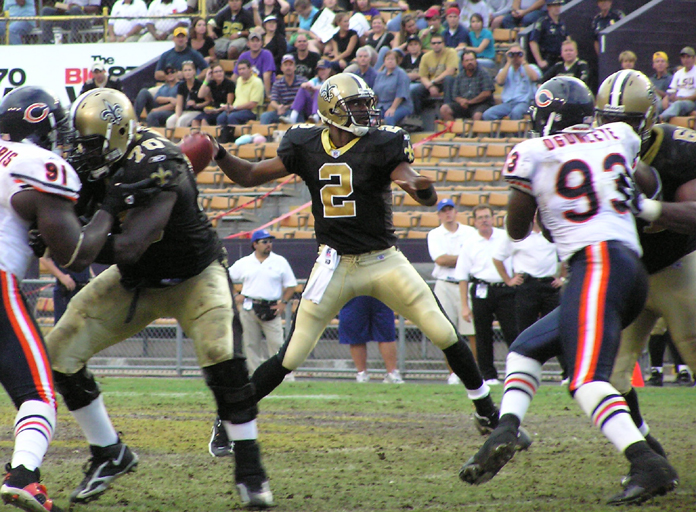
Quarterback Aaron Brooks against the Chicago Bears

==== Week 11: at New England Patriots ====
Week 11: New Orleans Saints at New England Patriots – Game summary

Quarter	1	2	3	4	Total
Saints	0	7	0	10	17
Patriots	7	7	7	3	24

at Gillette Stadium, Foxborough, Massachusetts

- Date: November 20
- Game time: 12:00 p.m. CST/1:00 p.m. EST
- Game weather: Sunny, 51 °F (11 °C)
- Game attendance: 68,756
- Referee: Gerry Austin
- TV announcers (Fox): Ron Pitts, Tim Ryan, and Butch Stearns

==== Week 12: at New York Jets ====
Week 12: New Orleans Saints at New York Jets – Game summary

Quarter	1	2	3	4	Total
Saints	0	14	0	7	21
Jets	3	6	7	3	19

at Giants Stadium, East Rutherford, New Jersey

- Date: November 27
- Game time: 7:30 p.m. CST/8:30 p.m. EST
- Game weather: Partly cloudy, 49 °F (9 °C)
- Game attendance: 77,152
- Referee: Terry McAulay
- TV announcers (ESPN): Mike Patrick, Joe Theismann, and Suzy Kolber

==== Week 13: vs. Tampa Bay Buccaneers ====
Week 13: Tampa Bay Buccaneers at New Orleans Saints – Game summary

Quarter	1	2	3	4	Total
Buccaneers	0	7	0	3	10
Saints	0	3	0	0	3

at Tiger Stadium, Baton Rouge, Louisiana

- Date: December 4
- Game time: 12:00 p.m. CST
- Game weather: Partly cloudy, 74 °F (23 °C)
- Game attendance: 34,411
- Referee: Pete Morelli

==== Week 14: at Atlanta Falcons ====
Week 14: New Orleans Saints at Atlanta Falcons – Game summary

Quarter	1	2	3	4	Total
Saints	3	14	0	0	17
Falcons	7	14	9	6	36

at Georgia Dome, Atlanta, Georgia

- Date: December 12
- Game time: 8:00 p.m. CST/9:00 p.m. EST
- Game weather: None (played indoors)
- Game attendance: 70,083
- Referee: Ron Winter
- TV announcers (ABC): Al Michaels, John Madden, Michele Tafoya, and Sam Ryan

==== Week 15: vs. Carolina Panthers ====
Week 15: Carolina Panthers at New Orleans Saints – Game summary

Quarter	1	2	3	4	Total
Panthers	7	10	7	3	27
Saints	7	0	0	3	10

at Tiger Stadium, Baton Rouge, Louisiana

- Date: December 18
- Game time: 12:00 p.m. CST
- Game weather: Partly cloudy, 55 °F (13 °C)
- Game attendance: 32,551
- Referee: Tony Corrente

==== Week 16: vs. Detroit Lions ====
Week 16: Detroit Lions at New Orleans Saints – Game summary

Quarter	1	2	3	4	Total
Lions	0	7	0	6	13
Saints	0	3	6	3	12

at Alamodome, San Antonio, Texas

- Date: December 24
- Game time: 12:00 p.m. CST
- Game weather: None (played indoors)
- Game attendance: 63,747
- Referee: Larry Nemmers

==== Week 17: at Tampa Bay Buccaneers ====
Week 17: New Orleans Saints at Tampa Bay Buccaneers – Game summary

Quarter	1	2	3	4	Total
Saints	0	10	0	3	13
Buccaneers	7	10	0	10	27

at Raymond James Stadium, Tampa Bay, Florida

- Date: January 1, 2006
- Game time: 12:00 p.m. CST/1:00 p.m. EST
- Game weather: Cloudy, 74 °F (23 °C)
- Game attendance: 65,379
- Referee: Jeff Triplette
- TV announcers (FOX): Kenny Albert, Brian Baldinger, Chip Carter

=== Standings ===
NFC South
	W	L	T	PCT	DIV	CONF	PF	PA	STK
^{(3)} Tampa Bay Buccaneers	11	5	0	.688	5–1	9–3	300	274	W2
^{(5)} Carolina Panthers	11	5	0	.688	4–2	8–4	391	259	W1
Atlanta Falcons	8	8	0	.500	2–4	5–7	351	341	L3
New Orleans Saints	3	13	0	.188	1–5	1–11	235	398	L5

== See also ==
- Effect of Hurricane Katrina on the New Orleans Saints
