= 2001 New Orleans Saints season =

NFL team season

- Head coach: Jim Haslett
- Offensive coordinator: Mike McCarthy
- Defensive coordinator: Ron Zook
- Home stadium: Louisiana Superdome

Results
- Record: 7–9
- Division place: 3rd NFC West
- Playoffs: Did not qualify
- Pro Bowlers: 3: WR Joe Horn; DT La'Roi Glover; SS Sammy Knight

The 2001 season was the New Orleans Saints' 35th in the National Football League (NFL), their 26th playing home games at the Louisiana Superdome, and second under head coach Jim Haslett. The Saints failed to improve on their 10–6 record and NFC West division championship from 2000 and finished 7–9, thus missing the playoffs for the eighth time in the past nine seasons.

The Saints were outscored 160–52 in their final four games, including losses of 40–10 and 38–0 in their last two games, against the Washington Redskins and the San Francisco 49ers.

== Bottlegate 2 incident ==
One of the Saints most infamous games that year occurred on December 17, 2001, a day after the Cleveland Browns Bottlegate. During the game against the St. Louis Rams, with 9:39 left in the fourth quarter, a defensive pass interference call was made against Saints player, Kevin Mathis, who was covering Rams receiver Torry Holt in the end zone during a pass. As a result, Saints fans in the Superdome became angry and started throwing beer bottles, cups, ice and paper onto the field. In the end, 13 fans were arrested.

== Offseason ==
=== NFL draft ===
2001 New Orleans Saints draft
Round	Pick	Player	Position	College	Notes
1	23	Deuce McAllister *	Running back	Mississippi	
3	70	Sedrick Hodge	Linebacker	North Carolina	
3	81	Kenny Smith	Defensive tackle	Alabama	
4	115	Moran Norris	Fullback	Kansas	
5	153	Onomo Ojo	Wide receiver	UC Davis	
6	185	Mitch White	Offensive tackle	Oregon State	
7	221	Ennis Davis	Defensive tackle	USC	
Made roster * Made at least one Pro Bowl during career

== Personnel ==
=== Staff ===
2001 New Orleans Saints staff
Front office: Owner – Tom Benson; General manager of football operations – Randy Mueller; Assistant general manager of football operations – Charles Bailey; Director of football administration – Mickey Loomis; Director of player personnel – Rick Mueller; College Scouting Coordinator – Rick Thompson; Head coaches: Head coach – Jim Haslett; Assistant head coach/secondary – Rick Venturi; Offensive coaches: Offensive coordinator – Mike McCarthy; Quarterbacks – Frank Cignetti, Jr.; Running backs – Dave Atkins; Wide receivers – Hubbard Alexander; Tight ends – Bob Palcic; Offensive line – Jack Henry; Offensive assistant/quality control – Jim Hostler	Defensive coaches: Defensive coordinator – Ron Zook; Defensive line – Sam Clancy; Linebackers – Winston Moss; Secondary/special teams Assistant – Joe Baker; Defensive assistant/quality control – Mike Woodford; Special teams coaches: Special teams – Al Everest; Strength and conditioning: Strength and conditioning – Rock Gullickson; Assistant strength and conditioning – Evan Marcus

=== Roster ===
2001 New Orleans Saints roster
Quarterbacks (QB): 18 Jeff Blake; 2 Aaron Brooks; 12 Jake Delhomme; Running backs (RB): 27 James Fenderson; 25 Fred McAfee; 26 Deuce McAllister KR; 33 Moran Norris FB; 44 Terrelle Smith FB; 34 Ricky Williams; Wide receivers (WR): 87 Joe Horn; 88 Willie Jackson; 84 Michael Lewis; 89 Wane McGarity PR; 86 Onome Ojo WR; 80 Robert Wilson; Tight ends (TE): 81 Lamont Hall; 83 Johnny Mitchell; 82 Boo Williams	Offensive linemen (OL): 69 Tom Ackerman C/G; 62 Jerry Fontenot C; 65 Chris Naeole G; 70 Marcus Price T; 76 Tutan Reyes G/T; 74 Scott Sanderson T; 78 Daryl Terrell G/T; 68 Kyle Turley T; 63 Wally Williams G; Defensive linemen (DL): 92 Martin Chase DT; 97 La'Roi Glover DT; 93 Darren Howard DE; 94 Joe Johnson DE; 90 Kenny Smith DT; 98 Willie Whitehead DE	Linebackers (LB): 56 Charlie Clemons MLB; 52 Sedrick Hodge OLB; 57 Curtis Holden OLB; 58 Jonathan Jackson MLB; 59 Keith Mitchell OLB; 54 Darrin Smith OLB; Defensive backs (DB): 20 Jay Bellamy FS; 41 Tim Carter CB; 37 Steve Gleason SS; 36 Michael Hawthorne CB; 21 Steve Israel CB; 29 Sammy Knight SS; 31 Richard Newsome FS; 28 Chris Oldham CB; 22 Fred Thomas CB; 24 Fred Weary CB; 42 Jerry Wilson CB/S; Special teams (ST): 3 John Carney K; 4 Toby Gowin P; 47 Kevin Houser LS	Practice squad: 96 Jermaine Miles DE; 30 Dee Moronkola CB; 11 Jim Robinson WR; 39 Trayvon Waller S; 79 Mitch White T; Reserve: 50 Phil Clarke LB (IR); 85 Cam Cleeland TE (IR); -- Albert Connell WR (Susp.); 99 Norman Hand DT (IR); 53 Roger Knight LB (IR); 23 Kevin Mathis CB (IR); 77 Willie Roaf T (IR); 53 active, 7 inactive, 5 practice squad Rookies in italics

== Regular season ==
=== Schedule ===
Week	Date	Opponent	Result	Record	Venue	Attendance
1	September 9	at Buffalo Bills	**W** 24–6	1–0	Ralph Wilson Stadium	71,447
2 (Note: The Saints were originally scheduled to host the San Francisco 49ers during Week 2 of the original NFL schedule (September 16) at Louisiana Superdome. However, due to the September 11 attacks, the game was rescheduled to Week 17.)	Bye					
3	September 30	at New York Giants	**L** 13–21	1–1	Giants Stadium	78,451
4	October 7	Minnesota Vikings	**W** 28–15	2–1	Louisiana Superdome	70,020
5	October 14	at **Carolina Panthers**	**W** 27–25	3–1	Ericcson Stadium	72,049
6	October 21	**Atlanta Falcons**	**L** 13–20	3–2	Louisiana Superdome	70,020
7	October 28	at **St. Louis Rams**	**W** 34–31	4–2	Trans World Dome	66,189
8	November 4	New York Jets	**L** 9–16	4–3	Louisiana Superdome	70,020
9	November 11	at **San Francisco 49ers**	**L** 27–28	4–4	3Com Park	68,063
10	November 18	Indianapolis Colts	**W** 34–20	5–4	Louisiana Superdome	70,020
11	November 25	at New England Patriots	**L** 17–34	5–5	Foxboro Stadium	60,292
12	December 2	**Carolina Panthers**	**W** 27–23	6–5	Louisiana Superdome	70,020
13	December 9	at **Atlanta Falcons**	**W** 28–10	7–5	Georgia Dome	68,826
14	December 17	**St. Louis Rams**	**L** 21–34	7–6	Louisiana Superdome	70,332
15	December 23	at Tampa Bay Buccaneers	**L** 21–48	7–7	Raymond James Stadium	65,526
16	December 30	Washington Redskins	**L** 10–40	7–8	Louisiana Superdome	70,020
17	January 6	**San Francisco 49ers**	**L** 0–38	7–9	Louisiana Superdome	70,020
Note: Intra-division opponents are in **bold** text.

=== Standings ===
NFC West
	W	L	T	PCT	PF	PA	STK
^{(1)} St. Louis Rams	14	2	0	.875	503	273	W6
^{(5)} San Francisco 49ers	12	4	0	.750	409	282	W1
New Orleans Saints	7	9	0	.438	333	409	L4
Atlanta Falcons	7	9	0	.438	291	377	L2
Carolina Panthers	1	15	0	.063	253	410	L15
