= Terrelle Smith =

American football player (born 1978)

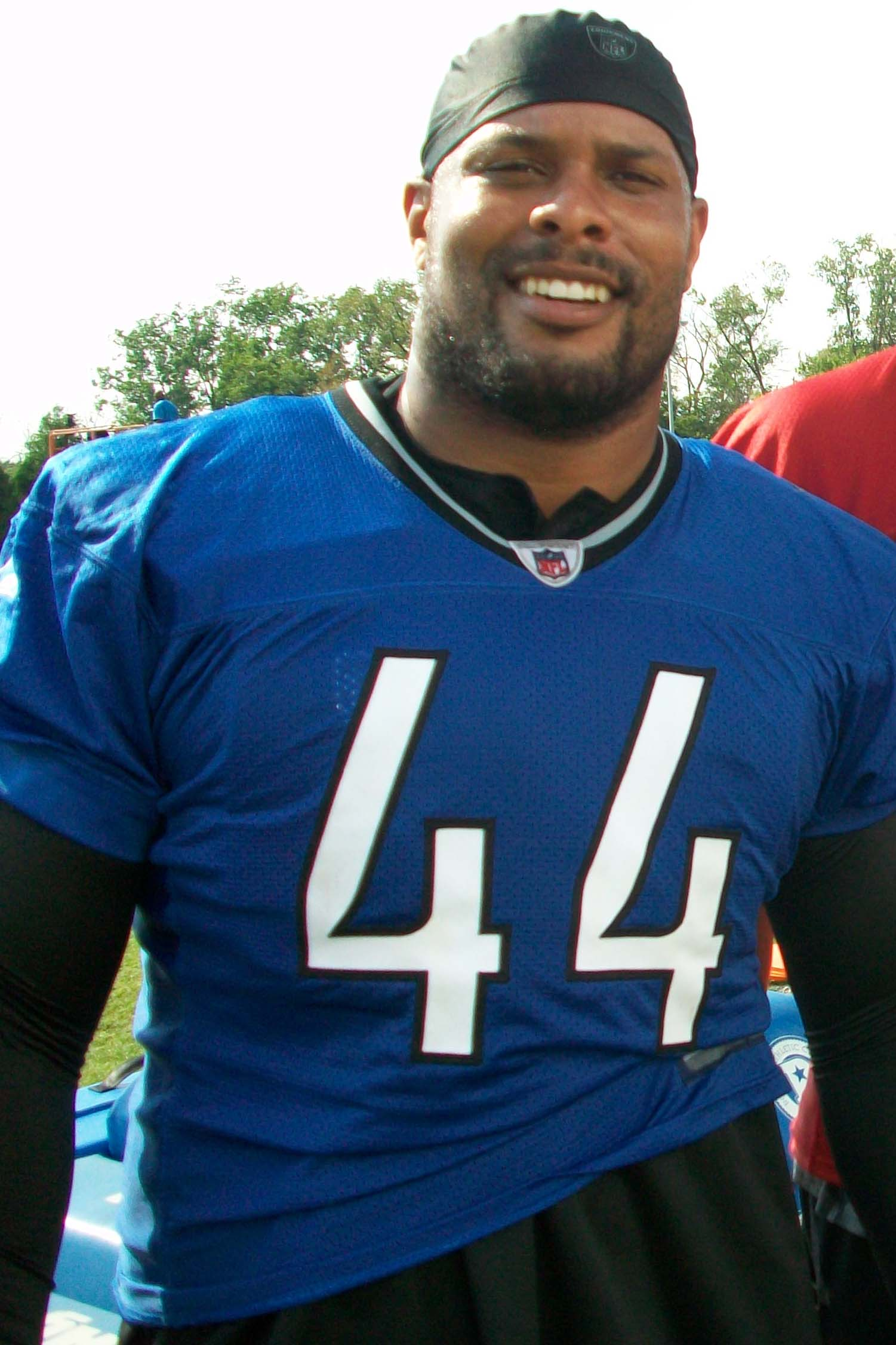
- Smith with the Detroit Lions in 2009

No. 44, 42, 45
- Position: Fullback

Personal information
- Born: March 12, 1978 (age 48); West Covina, California, U.S.
- Listed height: 6 ft 0 in (1.83 m)
- Listed weight: 246 lb (112 kg)

Career information
- High school: Moreno Valley (CA) Canyon Springs
- College: Arizona State
- NFL draft: 2000: 4th round, 96th overall pick

Career history
- New Orleans Saints (2000–2003); Cleveland Browns (2004–2006); Arizona Cardinals (2007–2008); Detroit Lions (2009)

Career NFL statistics
- Rushing attempts: 58
- Rushing yards: 185
- Receptions: 69
- Receiving yards: 361
- Receiving touchdowns: 3
- Stats at Pro Football Reference

Terrelle Vernon Smith (born March 12, 1978) is an American former professional football player who was a fullback in the National Football League (NFL). He played college football for the Arizona State Sun Devils and was selected by the New Orleans Saints in the fourth round of the 2000 NFL draft. Smith has also played for the Cleveland Browns, Arizona Cardinals and Detroit Lions. Smith's brother, Safety Da'Mon Cromartie-Smith, is a free agent.

== College career ==
At Arizona State, Smith served as a blocking back for J.R. Redmond after moving to fullback from the linebacker position. He had twenty-two carries for 129 yards (5.7 yards-per-carry average) with one touchdown, and added eleven receptions for 95 yards.

== Professional career ==
Pre-draft measurables
| Height | Weight | Arm length | Hand span | 40-yard dash | 10-yard split | 20-yard split | 20-yard shuttle | Three-cone drill | Vertical jump | Broad jump | Bench press |
|---|---|---|---|---|---|---|---|---|---|---|---|
| 6 ft 0 in (1.83 m) | 249 lb (113 kg) | 31 1/8 in (0.79 m) | 10 in (0.25 m) | 5.01 s | 1.66 s | 2.84 s | 4.85 s | 8.38 s | 32.5 in (0.83 m) | 9 ft 1 in (2.77 m) | 19 reps |
All values from NFL Combine

=== New Orleans Saints ===
Smith was selected in the fourth round with the 96th overall pick in the 2000 NFL draft by the New Orleans Saints. He signed a four-year, $1.7 million contract with the Saints. As a rookie, he appeared in fourteen games, including nine starts. He assumed the starting fullback role after being drafted and became one of the top blocking fullbacks in the league. He posted twenty-nine rushes for 131 yards and twelve receptions for 65 yards. He played all sixteen regular season games for the Saints during the 2002 season for the first time in his career, and helped bolster Deuce McAllister's rushing totals in 2003 thanks to his blocking.

=== Cleveland Browns ===
Smith was signed by the Cleveland Browns to a three-year $3.2 million contract as an unrestricted free agent on March 11, 2004, and played in all sixteen games of the 2004 season, including nine starts. He blocked for Lee Suggs' career-high 744-yard season. Smith went on to play in all sixteen games of the 2005 season (starting fifteen) and helped Reuben Droughns achieve the Browns' first thousand-yard season since the mid-1980s. On March 14, 2007, the Browns announced the release of Smith.

=== Arizona Cardinals ===
On March 23, 2007, he signed a two-year $1.8 million deal with the Cardinals. In 2007, he started 10 of 16 games and recorded the most receiving yards since his rookie season in 2000. In 2008, he was again the starting fullback and his role increased during the Cardinals' Super Bowl run, throwing key blocks during the playoffs. When asked about his role, Smith replied, "I'm a role player and my role is to lead the way and let my back run through the hole. It's not a statistics position . . . but in the end, if you can't block, you can't play the position."

=== Detroit Lions ===
Smith was an unrestricted free agent after the 2008 season and signed with the Detroit Lions on April 16, 2009. He was waived on December 17.

== NFL career statistics ==
Legend
| **Bold** | Career high |

=== Regular season ===
| Year | Team | Games | | Rushing | | | | | Receiving | | | | |
| Year | Team | GP | GS | Att | Yds | Avg | Lng | TD | Rec | Yds | Avg | Lng | TD |
|---|---|---|---|---|---|---|---|---|---|---|---|---|---|
| 2000 | NOR | 14 | 9 | **29** | **131** | **4.5** | **16** | 0 | **12** | **65** | 5.4 | 10 | 0 |
| 2001 | NOR | 14 | 9 | 5 | 8 | 1.6 | 6 | 0 | 4 | 30 | 7.5 | 12 | **2** |
| 2002 | NOR | **16** | 8 | 5 | 11 | 2.2 | 5 | 0 | 9 | 30 | 3.3 | 10 | 0 |
| 2003 | NOR | 15 | 10 | 0 | 0 | 0.0 | 0 | 0 | 6 | 28 | 4.7 | 8 | 0 |
| 2004 | CLE | **16** | 9 | 4 | 9 | 2.3 | 4 | 0 | 7 | 39 | 5.6 | 16 | 0 |
| 2005 | CLE | **16** | **15** | 6 | 9 | 1.5 | 4 | 0 | **12** | 58 | 4.8 | 9 | 1 |
| 2006 | CLE | **16** | 8 | 8 | 14 | 1.8 | 3 | 0 | 8 | 21 | 2.6 | 7 | 0 |
| 2007 | ARI | **16** | 10 | 1 | 3 | 3.0 | 3 | 0 | 7 | 59 | 8.4 | 16 | 0 |
| 2008 | ARI | 15 | 6 | 0 | 0 | 0.0 | 0 | 0 | 2 | 24 | **12.0** | **18** | 0 |
| 2009 | DET | 8 | 0 | 0 | 0 | 0.0 | 0 | 0 | 2 | 7 | 3.5 | 4 | 0 |
| | | 146 | 84 | 58 | 185 | 3.2 | 16 | 0 | 69 | 361 | 5.2 | 18 | 3 |

=== Playoffs ===
| Year | Team | Games | | Rushing | | | | | Receiving | | | | |
| Year | Team | GP | GS | Att | Yds | Avg | Lng | TD | Rec | Yds | Avg | Lng | TD |
|---|---|---|---|---|---|---|---|---|---|---|---|---|---|
| 2008 | ARI | **4** | **2** | **1** | 0 | 0.0 | 0 | 0 | **1** | **4** | **4.0** | **4** | 0 |
| | | 4 | 2 | 1 | 0 | 0.0 | 0 | 0 | 1 | 4 | 4.0 | 4 | 0 |
