= James Fenderson =

American football player (born 1976)

No. 27, 48, 30
- Position: Running back

Personal information
- Born: October 24, 1976 (age 50); Long Beach, California

Career information
- High school: Mililani (Mililani, Hawaii)
- College: Hawaii
- NFL draft: 2001: undrafted

Career history
- New Orleans Saints (2001–2003); Atlanta Falcons (2004)*
- * Offseason or practice squad member only

Career NFL statistics
- Rushing yards: 79
- Rushing average: 4.6
- Receptions-yards: 7-43
- Touchdowns: 1
- Total tackles: 13
- Stats at Pro Football Reference

James Edward Fenderson Jr. (born October 24, 1976) is an American former professional football player who was a running back in the National Football League (NFL). He played college football for the Hawaii Warriors after transferring from Long Beach City College. An undrafted free agent, Fenderson played for the New Orleans Saints of the National Football League from 2001 to 2003.

== Early life and college career ==
Born in Long Beach, California, Fenderson attended Mililani High School in Mililani, Hawaii. Fenderson lettered in football, basketball, and track at Mililani High and graduated in 1995.

Returning to California, Fenderson began his college football career on the junior college level playing at safety at Long Beach City College in 1996 and 1997. In 1999, Fenderson transferred to the University of Hawaiʻi at Mānoa, where he walked on to the Hawaii Warriors. He played at running back in 1999 and 2000 under June Jones. In 1999, Fenderson played on 10 games primarily on special teams. He had 12 special teams tackles and two carries for 22 yards during a season where Hawaii went 9–4 and won the Oahu Bowl. During that season, Fenderson slept in his truck or teammates' dorm room floors while working part time to pay for his living expenses.

Being awarded a scholarship, Fenderson had a breakout senior season in 2000, leading the Warriors in rushing with 113 carries for 651 yards and seven touchdowns on the ground. He also had seven receptions for 30 yards and a touchdown. However, Hawaii went only 3–9 in 2000.

== Professional career ==
After going undrafted in the 2001 NFL draft, Fenderson signed as a free agent with the New Orleans Saints on April 26, 2001. He was waived on September 7 before being re-signed to the practice squad. On December 13, the Saints promoted Fenderson to the active roster. Fenderson played in the final four games of the season on special teams and made three special teams tackles.

In 2002, Fenderson played in 16 games with one start, usually on special teams and as the backup to starting running back Deuce McAllister. Fenderson had his first NFL carry on September 15, an 11-yard run against the Green Bay Packers. Fenderson finished the season with 13 carries for 65 yards and a touchdown, six receptions for 38 yards, two kickoff returns for 43 yards, and five tackles.

Fenderson played nine games off the bench in 2003, this time with four carries for 14 yards, one reception for 5 yards, and six tackles. Following a foot injury, Fenderson was placed on injured reserve.

On March 22, 2004, Fenderson signed with the Atlanta Falcons. Following the preseason, he was released from the team on September 6.
