= Darren Howard =

American football player (born 1976)

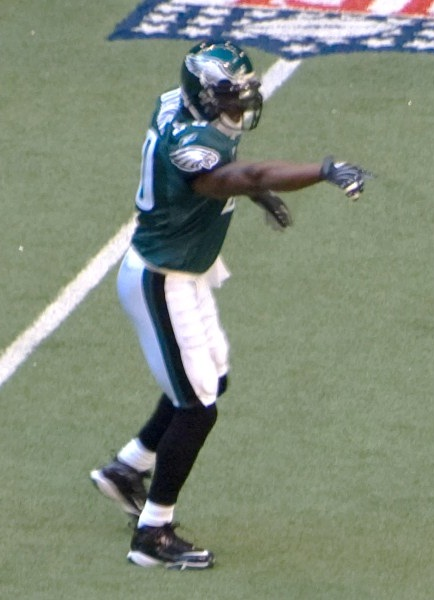
- Howard with the Philadelphia Eagles in 2007

No. 93, 90
- Position: Defensive end

Personal information
- Born: November 19, 1976 (age 49); St. Petersburg, Florida, U.S.
- Listed height: 6 ft 3 in (1.91 m)
- Listed weight: 260 lb (118 kg)

Career information
- High school: Boca Ciega (Gulfport, Florida)
- College: Kansas State
- NFL draft: 2000: 2nd round, 33rd overall pick

Career history
- New Orleans Saints (2000–2005); Philadelphia Eagles (2006–2009)

Awards and highlights
- PFWA All-Rookie Team (2000); Third-team All-American (1999); 2× First-team All-Big 12 (1998, 1999); Second-team All-Big 12 (1997)

Career NFL statistics
- Total tackles: 352
- Sacks: 67
- Forced fumbles: 18
- Fumble recoveries: 10
- Interceptions: 3
- Stats at Pro Football Reference

Darren M. Howard (born November 19, 1976) is an American former professional football player who was a defensive end in the National Football League (NFL). He played college football for the Kansas State Wildcats and was selected by the New Orleans Saints in the second round of the 2000 NFL draft.

Howard also played for the Philadelphia Eagles.

== Early life ==
Howard attended Boca Ciega High School in Gulfport, Florida and was a letterman in football and basketball. In football, he was an All-City, All-County, and an All-SunCoast selection. In basketball, he helped lead his team to the 1994 Florida State Championship.

== College career ==
Howard played college football for the Kansas State Wildcats.

== Professional career ==
=== 2000–2005: New Orleans Saints ===
Howard was selected 33rd overall by the New Orleans Saints in the second round of the 2000 NFL draft. From 2000-2005, he played defensive end for the Saints. In his rookie season he posted an impressive 11 sacks and an interception.

=== 2006–2009: Philadelphia Eagles ===
On March 13, 2006, he joined the Philadelphia Eagles through free agency, by signing a six-year deal. In 2008, Howard led the Eagles in sacks (10.5), most of which came from the defensive tackle position in passing downs. He was released on March 18, 2010.

=== NFL statistics ===
Year	Team	Games	Combined tackles	Tackles	Assisted tackles	Sacks	Forced fumbles	Fumble recoveries
2000	NO	16	51	36	15	11.0	1	2
2001	NO	16	53	35	18	6.0	3	0
2002	NO	16	47	34	13	8.0	3	0
2003	NO	8	29	27	2	5.0	0	1
2004	NO	13	46	36	10	11.0	4	3
2005	NO	12	33	24	9	3.5	2	2
2006	PHI	16	35	22	13	5.0	2	1
2007	PHI	16	8	5	3	1.0	0	0
2008	PHI	16	26	21	5	10.0	1	1
2009	PHI	16	24	21	3	6.5	2	0
Career		145	352	261	91	67.0	18	10
