= Charles Grant (defensive end) =

American football player (born 1978)

No. 94
- Position: Defensive end

Personal information
- Born: September 3, 1978 (age 48); Colquitt, Georgia, U.S.
- Listed height: 6 ft 3 in (1.91 m)
- Listed weight: 285 lb (129 kg)

Career information
- High school: Miller County (Colquitt)
- College: Georgia
- NFL draft: 2002: 1st round, 25th overall pick

Career history
- New Orleans Saints (2002–2009); Miami Dolphins (2010)*; Omaha Nighthawks (2010); Chicago Bears (2010)
- * Offseason or practice squad member only

Awards and highlights
- Super Bowl champion (XLIV); Second-team All-SEC (2001)

Career NFL statistics
- Total tackles: 430
- Sacks: 47
- Forced fumbles: 17
- Fumble recoveries: 5
- Interceptions: 1
- Defensive touchdowns: 1
- Stats at Pro Football Reference

Charles Gabriel Grant (born September 3, 1978) is an American former professional football player who was a defensive end in the National Football League (NFL). He was selected by the New Orleans Saints in the first round of the 2002 NFL draft. He played college football for the Georgia Bulldogs.

Grant was also a member of the Miami Dolphins, Omaha Nighthawks and Chicago Bears.

== Early life ==
Grant played for Miller County High School in Colquitt, Georgia, in 1998, where he was both an offensive and defensive player. He later played both offense and defense at Hargrave Military Academy in 1998. Was a Parade Magazine 1997 All-American. He tied Herschel Walker's state single-season touchdown record with 45 in 1997 and added 3,472 all-purpose yards. Totaled 101 touchdowns in his three-year career at Miller County (Ga.) HS.

== College career ==
Grant was a three-year letterman and two-year starter at the University of Georgia. He ended career with 136 tackles, 27 tackles-for-loss and 15 sacks. His sack total ranks sixth on the school's all-time list. He totaled 63 tackles and six sacks as a junior in 2001. As a freshman, he recorded 33 tackles and seven sacks, while also seeing duty in offensive backfield, rushing for 79 yards and three touchdowns at fullback. Majored in arts and sciences.

== Professional career ==
Pre-draft measurables
Height	Weight	Arm length	Hand span	20-yard shuttle	Three-cone drill	Vertical jump	Broad jump	Bench press
6 ft 3 in (1.91 m)	282 lb (128 kg)	34 in (0.86 m)	9 1/2 in (0.24 m)	4.39 s	7.69 s	31.0 in (0.79 m)	9 ft 10 in (3.00 m)	24 reps
All values from NFL Combine

=== New Orleans Saints ===
Grant was selected by the Saints with the 25th pick overall in the 2002 NFL draft. The Saints acquired the pick that was used to draft Grant through a trade with the Miami Dolphins that sent Ricky Williams to Miami. Grant's seven sacks in 2002 were the fourth-highest total for a Saints rookie, and he recorded 20.5 sacks from 2003 to 2004. He was the second of two first-round picks (25th overall) for New Orleans in 2002, following wide receiver Donte' Stallworth (13th overall). He finished second with seven sacks for minus-40 yards, 36 tackles (32 solo), two passes defensed, four forced fumbles and one fumble recovery. Appeared in 16 games and started six at LDE. Finished tied for 20th in the NFC with seven sack total. Grant got a six-year extension with the Saints on July 27, 2002. After showing glimpses of his vast potential as a rookie, Grant came through with a big season and started all 16 games in 2003. He led the team with 10 sacks and three forced fumbles, and led the defensive line with 53 tackles (39 solo). He started all 16 contests for the second-straight season in 2004 and paced the defensive line with 113 tackles (69 solo) while posting a career-high 10.5 sacks. He also posted his first career interception. In 2005, he appeared in all 16 contests, starting 14 games at RDE, recording 62 tackles (44 solo), 2.5 sacks, two passes defensed and a fumble recovery. He bounced back from a relatively subpar season in 2006 with 6 sacks and 64 tackles (49 solo) in 16 games. He also collected 3 forced fumbles with 2 recoveries and 6 passes defensed. 2007 was Grant's worst season as a pro statistically, as he appeared in 14 of 16 games and compiled only 2.5 sacks to go along with 48 tackles (39 solo). He also chipped in with 2 passes defensed. Grant underwent surgery on a torn ligament in his left ankle the 2007-2008 offseason. Grant apparently injured his ankle on October 28, 2007, but was able to return after missing two games. The severity of the injury was known by the Saints, but never discussed with the media, and Grant admitted that he was not as sharp after the injury. On December 2, 2008, he received a four-game suspension for use of a diuretic, which can be used a masking agent for steroid use. It is believed that the diuretic was found in a weight-loss supplement that he had been taking. Charles Grant was due to be suspended for the first 4 games of the Saints' 2009 season, but the league has delayed suspension pending the outcome of a filed litigation by Kevin Williams and Pat Williams of the Minnesota Vikings, who were also accused for using the same diuretic. After starting at left defensive end throughout the regular season, he went on injured reserve for the playoffs with a torn triceps. (He nevertheless received a Super Bowl ring in recognition of his role in the Saints' championship season.) Grant was released by the Saints on March 5, 2010.

=== Miami Dolphins ===
After he left the Saints, Grant briefly appeared on the roster of the Omaha Nighthawks of the United Football League, but he did not actually join the team once it appeared that he could continue with an NFL career. Grant signed a two-year contract with the Miami Dolphins on July 28, 2010. The Dolphins cut Grant on September 5, 2010.

=== Omaha Nighthawks ===
Grant signed with the Omaha Nighthawks of the United Football League on September 21, 2010.

=== Chicago Bears ===
Grant signed with the Chicago Bears of the National Football League on October 5, 2010. He was released on October 19.

== NFL career statistics ==
Legend
	Led the league
**Bold**	Career high

=== Regular season ===
Year	Team	Games		Tackles					Interceptions					Fumbles			
Year	Team	GP	GS	Cmb	Solo	Ast	Sck	TFL	Int	Yds	TD	Lng	PD	FF	FR	Yds	TD
2002	NOR	**16**	6	37	30	7	7.0	10	0	0	0	0	4	**4**	1	**34**	**1**
2003	NOR	**16**	**16**	61	48	13	10.0	11	0	0	0	0	**7**	**4**	0	0	0
2004	NOR	**16**	**16**	**80**	**66**	14	**10.5**	**19**	**1**	**8**	0	**8**	**7**	3	1	0	0
2005	NOR	**16**	14	62	44	**18**	2.5	5	0	0	0	0	2	1	1	23	0
2006	NOR	**16**	**16**	65	50	15	6.0	6	0	0	0	0	5	3	**2**	0	0
2007	NOR	14	14	48	39	9	2.5	5	0	0	0	0	2	1	0	0	0
2008	NOR	8	8	33	27	6	3.0	4	0	0	0	0	2	0	0	0	0
2009	NOR	**16**	**16**	44	31	13	5.5	6	0	0	0	0	2	1	0	0	0
		118	106	430	335	95	47.0	66	1	8	0	8	31	17	5	57	1

=== Playoffs ===
Year	Team	Games		Tackles					Interceptions					Fumbles			
Year	Team	GP	GS	Cmb	Solo	Ast	Sck	TFL	Int	Yds	TD	Lng	PD	FF	FR	Yds	TD
2006	NOR	**2**	**2**	**5**	**4**	**1**	0.0	**1**	0	0	0	0	0	0	0	0	0
		2	2	5	4	1	0.0	1	0	0	0	0	0	0	0	0	0

== Legal troubles ==
Grant was indicted on a charge of involuntary manslaughter stemming from a February 2008 altercation at a nightclub in which a pregnant woman was shot to death outside a Blakely, Georgia nightclub. Korynda Reed, 23, and her unborn fetus died after being taken to the Southeast Alabama Medical Center in Dothan after the fight early in the morning of February 3, 2008. Grant has said that he was neither an instigator nor a participant in the fight. Grant was arraigned on August 15, 2008. The criminal case was resolved in May 2010 when Grant pleaded guilty to a charge of public affray, he was assessed a $1,000 fine and a year's probation, and ordered to pay $20,000 for the cost of the investigation by the sheriff's office; the more serious involuntary murder charge was dismissed. Grant still faced a civil suit by the family of the victim.
