= Kenny Smith (American football) =

American football player (born 1977)

No. 90
- Position: Defensive tackle

Personal information
- Born: September 8, 1977 (age 49); Meridian, Mississippi, U.S.
- Listed height: 6 ft 4 in (1.93 m)
- Listed weight: 303 lb (137 kg)

Career information
- High school: Meridian
- College: Alabama
- NFL draft: 2001: 3rd round, 81st overall pick

Career history
- New Orleans Saints (2001–2004); Oakland Raiders (2005); Tampa Bay Buccaneers (2007)*; New England Patriots (2007)*;(2008); Kansas City Chiefs (2009)
- * Offseason or practice squad member only

Awards and highlights
- Second-team All-SEC (1999)

Career NFL statistics
- Total tackles: 72
- Sacks: 4.5
- Fumble recoveries: 2
- Pass deflections: 2
- Stats at Pro Football Reference

Kenny Smith (born September 8, 1977) is an American former professional football player who was a defensive tackle in the National Football League (NFL). He was selected by the New Orleans Saints in the third round of the 2001 NFL draft. He played college football for the Alabama Crimson Tide.

Smith was also a member of the Oakland Raiders, Tampa Bay Buccaneers, New England Patriots, and Kansas City Chiefs.

== Professional career ==
Pre-draft measurables
Height	Weight	40-yard dash	10-yard split	20-yard split	20-yard shuttle	Three-cone drill	Vertical jump
6 ft 4 in (1.93 m)	299 lb (136 kg)	5.24 s	1.79 s	3.01 s	4.80 s	8.00 s	30.0 in (0.76 m)
All values from NFL Combine

=== New Orleans Saints ===
Smith was selected in the third round of the 2001 NFL draft by the New Orleans Saints. He appeared in six games as a rookie in 2001, recording eight tackles. He played in nine games in 2002, starting one while posting 19 tackles and 3.5 sacks on the season. He had a career-high 42 tackles in 15 games (nine starts) in 2003, while recording one sack. He spent 2004 on injured reserve.

=== Oakland Raiders ===
Smith signed with the Oakland Raiders as an unrestricted free agent on March 31, 2005, but was placed on injured reserve and was released on November 2, 2005.

=== Tampa Bay Buccaneers ===
After spending 2006 out of football, Smith signed with the Tampa Bay Buccaneers on March 7, 2007. The team released him on April 30, 2007.

=== New England Patriots ===
Smith signed with the Patriots on June 8, 2007. He was released on August 22, 2007, and re-signed with the Patriots on April 22, 2008. Before the 2008 season he was placed on injured reserve and missed the entire season. He was released on June 4, 2009.

=== Kansas City Chiefs ===
Smith was signed by the Chiefs on October 21, 2009, and waived on December 8, 2009.

== NFL career statistics ==
Legend
**Bold**	Career high

Year	Team	Games		Tackles					Interceptions					Fumbles			
Year	Team	GP	GS	Cmb	Solo	Ast	Sck	TFL	Int	Yds	TD	Lng	PD	FF	FR	Yds	TD
2001	NO	6	0	8	7	1	0.0	0	0	0	0	0	0	0	0	0	0
2002	NO	9	1	19	16	3	**3.5**	**4**	0	0	0	0	**1**	0	**1**	0	0
2003	NO	**15**	**9**	**42**	**32**	**10**	1.0	2	0	0	0	0	**1**	0	**1**	0	0
2009	KC	6	0	3	3	0	0.0	0	0	0	0	0	0	0	0	0	0
		36	10	72	58	14	4.5	6	0	0	0	0	2	0	2	0	0

== Personal ==
Smith's son, J'Mar, played quarterback at Louisiana Tech and was named Conference USA's 2019 Football Offensive Player of the Year. On May 5, 2020, J'Mar signed as an undrafted free agent with the New England Patriots.
