= Toby Gowin =

American football player (born 1975)

No. 4
- Position: Punter

Personal information
- Born: March 30, 1975 (age 51); Jacksonville, Texas, U.S.
- Listed height: 5 ft 10 in (1.78 m)
- Listed weight: 167 lb (76 kg)

Career information
- High school: Jacksonville
- College: North Texas
- NFL draft: 1997: undrafted

Career history
- Dallas Cowboys (1997–1999); New Orleans Saints (2000–2002); Dallas Cowboys (2003); New York Jets (2004); Atlanta Falcons (2005)*; Jacksonville Jaguars (2006)*
- * Offseason or practice squad member only

Awards and highlights
- Third-team All-American (1996); All-Big West (1996)

Career NFL statistics
- Punts: 629
- Punt yards: 25,932
- Longest punt: 72
- Stats at Pro Football Reference

Toby Lee Gowin (born March 30, 1975) is an American former professional football player who was a punter in the National Football League (NFL) for the Dallas Cowboys, New Orleans Saints and New York Jets. He played college football for the North Texas Mean Green.

== Early life ==
Gowin attended Jacksonville High School. As a senior, he converted 5-of-8 field goals and 30-of-32 extra points, while averaging 38.5 yards per punt. He received All-District, All-East Texas and All-State honors as a kicker.

He accepted a football scholarship from the University of North Texas, where he was a four-year starter while handling the punting and kickoff duties.

As a sophomore, he received Academic All-SLC honors with a 36.1 yards punting average. As a junior, he ranked 19th in the nation with a 42.1 yard average on 78 punts.

As a senior, he registered 89 punts (school record) for 3,946 yards (school record), ranking 15th in the nation with a 44.3 yards average. He made 27 punts of 50-plus yards and his 92-yard punt against Vanderbilt University set the mark for the longest in school history. He received All-Big West and third-team All-American honors. He was the first Eagle to earn a major college All-American nomination since NFL Hall of Famer Joe Greene in 1969.

In 2003, he was inducted into the University of North Texas Athletic Hall of Fame.

== Professional career ==
=== Dallas Cowboys (first stint) ===
Gowin was signed as an undrafted free agent by the Dallas Cowboys after the 1997 NFL draft on April 24, to compete for the position left by John Jett. He made the team because of his leg strength and ability to both punt and handle kickoffs. He struggled with a 41.8 yards gross average, although it was the third highest average in franchise history for a rookie. He posted 86 punts (franchise rookie record) and 12 touchbacks on kickoffs. He set a franchise record by averaging 55.3 yards a punt on six punts (332 yards) against the Chicago Bears, which included a 72-yard punt which was the second-longest in the NFC for the season. He downed 5 of 6 punts inside the 20-yard line in the sixth game against the Washington Redskins. He also had a 35.4-yard net average, while landing 26 punts inside the 20-yard line.

In 1998, he improved all of his stats, averaging 43.4 yards per punt (tied for seventh in the NFC) and setting a team record with 31 punts inside the 20-yard line. He also had 17 touchbacks on kickoffs. Had had 4 touchbacks on kickoffs against the Denver Broncos. He averaged 46.5 yards on seven punts against the New Orleans Saints, including dropping 3 inside the 20-yard line.

In 1999, he was second in the NFC and seventh in the NFL with a 43.2 yards average on 81 punts. He made at least one punt of 50-plus yards in 14 of 17 contests. He had 12 touchbacks on 71 kickoffs. He downed 5 punts inside the 20-yard line in the fourth game against the Philadelphia Eagles. He averaged a season-high 53.3 yards on 4 punts in the sixth game against the Washington Redskins, receiving NFC Special Teams Player of the Week.

=== New Orleans Saints ===
On April 6, 2000, he was signed as a restricted free agent by the New Orleans Saints, after the Cowboys did not match the Saints three-year offer. He registered 74 punts for 3,043 yards (41.1-yard avg.), with 22 downed inside the 20- yard line. He tied for fourth on the team with 11 special teams tackles. He had 7 punts for 340 yards (48.6-yard avg.) with a long of 58 yards against the Detroit Lions. He placed four of seven punts inside the 20-yard line against the Philadelphia Eagles. He hit 6 punts in the NFC Wild Card Game against the St. Louis Rams.

In 2001, he posted 76 punts for 3,180 yards (41.8-yard avg.), while dropping 25 inside the 20-yard line. He had 8 punts for 348 yards (43.5 avg.), with two punts inside the 20-yard line and a long of 57 yards in the fourth game against the Carolina Panthers. He downed 4 punts inside the 20-yard line against the New York Jets.

In 2002, he finished sixth in the NFC with a 41.9-yards gross average and a 36.9 net average. He had 3 punts for 147 yards (49.0-yard avg.) with a long of 52 yards against the Pittsburgh Steelers. He punted eight times for 372 yards (46.5-yardavg.) with one punt downed inside the 20-yard line in the ninth game against the Carolina Panthers.

=== Dallas Cowboys (second stint) ===
On March 3, 2003, Gowin signed with the Dallas Cowboys. He injured his thigh in training camp, which affected his play, ranking 28th in the league with a gross average of 39 yards and 16th with a net average of 34.9 yards. He was sixth in the NFC with 25 punts inside the 20-yard line. He was waived on March 10, 2004. He hit a season-long 59-yard punt and averaged 43.5 yards on 4 punts in the eighth game against the Washington Redskins. He downed 5 of 8 punts inside the 20-yard line against the Buffalo Bills.

=== New York Jets ===
On March 31, 2004, he was signed by the New York Jets to replace Dan Stryzinski. He wasn't re-signed at the end of the season.

=== Atlanta Falcons ===
On March 8, 2005, he signed as a free agent with the Atlanta Falcons. On August 26, he was released after being beaten out by Michael Koenen.

=== Jacksonville Jaguars ===
On May 22, 2006, he was signed by the Jacksonville Jaguars to compete with Chris Hanson. He was released on August 14. He finished his career with 629 punts for 25,932 yards (41.2-yard avg.), 190 punts downed inside the 20-yard line, 63 touchbacks on 593 kickoffs, 12 onsides kicks with 5 recoveries and his longest punt was a 72-yarder.

== Career statistics ==
Legend
**Bold**	Career high

=== Regular season ===
Year	Team	GP	Punting				
Year	Team	GP	Punts	Yards	Avg	Lng	Blk
1997	DAL	**16**	86	3,592	41.8	**72**	0
1998	DAL	**16**	77	3,342	**43.4**	65	**1**
1999	DAL	**16**	81	3,500	43.2	64	0
2000	NOR	**16**	74	3,043	41.1	58	0
2001	NOR	**16**	76	3,180	41.8	52	0
2002	NOR	15	61	2,553	41.9	59	0
2003	DAL	**16**	**94**	**3,665**	39.0	59	0
2004	NYJ	**16**	80	3,057	38.2	58	0
Career		127	629	25,932	41.2	72	1
