= Fred Thomas (cornerback) =

American football player (born 1973)

No. 22
- Position: Cornerback

Personal information
- Born: September 11, 1973 (age 53); Bruce, Mississippi, U.S.
- Listed height: 5 ft 9 in (1.75 m)
- Listed weight: 185 lb (84 kg)

Career information
- College: Northwest Mississippi (1992); Mississippi Valley State (1993); Ole Miss (1994); UT Martin (1995)
- NFL draft: 1996: 2nd round, 47th overall pick

Career history
- Seattle Seahawks (1996–1999); New Orleans Saints (2000–2007)

Career NFL statistics
- Total tackles: 523
- Sacks: 5
- Forced fumbles: 9
- Fumble recoveries: 7
- Interceptions: 13
- Touchdowns: 1
- Stats at Pro Football Reference

Frederick L. Thomas (born September 11, 1973) is an American former professional football player who was a cornerback in the National Football League (NFL). He was selected by the Seattle Seahawks in the second round of the 1996 NFL draft. He played college football for the UT Martin Skyhawks.

Thomas also played for the New Orleans Saints.

== College career ==
Thomas originally played college football for Northwest Mississippi Community College during the 1992–1993 seasons. He then transferred to Ole Miss, again transferred to the University of Tennessee at Martin, and again transferred to the Mississippi Valley State.

== Professional career ==
=== Seattle Seahawks ===
Thomas played for the Seattle Seahawks from 1996 to 1999.

=== New Orleans Saints ===
Thomas signed with the New Orleans Saints before the 2000 season. He played for them until 2007. He finished his Saints career with 13 interceptions and 5 sacks. His best seasons came in 2002 and 2003. In 2002, he recorded 1 Sack, 5 INT, 14 PD, and 91 tackles. In 2003, he recorded 1 Sack, 4 INT, 22 PD, and 85 Tackles.

== NFL career statistics ==
Legend
**Bold**	Career high

=== Regular season ===
Year	Team	Games		Tackles				Interceptions				Fumbles			
Year	Team	GP	GS	Comb	Solo	Ast	Sck	Int	Yds	TD	Lng	FF	FR	Yds	TD
1996	SEA	15	0	5	4	1	0.0	0	0	0	0	0	0	0	0
1997	SEA	16	3	28	24	4	0.0	0	0	0	0	0	0	0	0
1998	SEA	15	2	39	32	7	0.0	0	0	0	0	0	1	0	0
1999	SEA	1	0	0	0	0	0.0	0	0	0	0	0	0	0	0
2000	NOR	11	0	23	23	0	0.0	0	0	0	0	1	0	0	0
2001	NOR	16	16	68	55	13	0.0	1	0	0	0	0	0	0	0
2002	NOR	15	14	83	71	12	1.0	**5**	**80**	0	**43**	**2**	1	0	0
2003	NOR	16	14	**85**	**74**	11	1.0	4	47	0	20	**2**	1	0	0
2004	NOR	15	7	48	46	2	0.0	0	0	0	0	0	**2**	0	0
2005	NOR	16	11	80	61	**19**	**3.0**	2	4	0	4	0	**2**	0	0
2006	NOR	13	13	57	50	7	0.0	1	9	0	9	**2**	0	0	0
2007	NOR	7	0	7	7	0	0.0	0	0	0	0	**2**	0	0	0
		156	80	523	447	76	5.0	13	140	0	43	9	7	0	0

=== Playoffs ===
Year	Team	Games		Tackles				Interceptions				Fumbles			
Year	Team	GP	GS	Comb	Solo	Ast	Sck	Int	Yds	TD	Lng	FF	FR	Yds	TD
2000	NOR	2	1	**8**	**6**	**2**	0.0	0	0	0	0	0	0	0	0
2006	NOR	2	2	5	4	1	0.0	0	0	0	0	0	0	0	0
		4	3	13	10	3	0.0	0	0	0	0	0	0	0	0
