= Sedrick Hodge =

American football player (born 1978)

No. 52
- Position: Linebacker

Personal information
- Born: September 13, 1978 (age 48); Fayetteville, Georgia, U.S.
- Listed height: 6 ft 4 in (1.93 m)
- Listed weight: 246 lb (112 kg)

Career information
- High school: The Westminster Schools (Atlanta, Georgia)
- College: North Carolina
- NFL draft: 2001: 3rd round, 70th overall pick

Career history
- New Orleans Saints (2001–2005); Miami Dolphins (2006)*
- * Offseason or practice squad member only

Career NFL statistics
- Tackles: 211
- Sacks: 1
- Passes defended: 11
- Stats at Pro Football Reference

Sedrick Hodge (born September 13, 1978) is an American former professional football player who was a linebacker in the National Football League (NFL) for the New Orleans Saints from 2001 to 2005. He was selected in the third round of the 2001 NFL Draft. He was signed by the Miami Dolphins before the 2006 season but was cut right before the season began. Before his NFL career, Sedrick was a standout linebacker at The Westminster Schools in Atlanta and played college football at the University of North Carolina at Chapel Hill.

Pre-draft measurables
Height	Weight	Arm length	Hand span	40-yard dash	10-yard split	20-yard split	20-yard shuttle	Vertical jump	Broad jump	Bench press
6 ft 3 3/4 in (1.92 m)	244 lb (111 kg)	31 1/2 in (0.80 m)	9 in (0.23 m)	4.47 s	1.58 s	2.59 s	4.09 s	32.0 in (0.81 m)	10 ft 0 in (3.05 m)	21 reps
All values from NFL Combine

== NFL career statistics ==
Legend
**Bold**	Career high

Year	Team	Games		Tackles					Interceptions					Fumbles			
Year	Team	GP	GS	Cmb	Solo	Ast	Sck	TFL	Int	Yds	TD	Lng	PD	FF	FR	Yds	TD
2001	NOR	**16**	1	22	19	3	0.0	1	0	0	0	0	1	0	0	0	0
2002	NOR	**16**	**15**	**76**	**59**	**17**	0.0	**3**	0	0	0	0	**4**	0	**1**	0	0
2003	NOR	9	9	37	32	5	**1.0**	1	0	0	0	0	3	0	0	0	0
2004	NOR	9	6	25	18	7	0.0	1	0	0	0	0	2	0	0	0	0
2005	NOR	13	12	51	36	15	0.0	2	0	0	0	0	1	0	0	0	0
Career		63	43	211	164	47	1.0	8	0	0	0	0	11	0	1	0	0
