= Fred McAfee =

American football player (born 1968)

No. 25, 35, 26, 30
- Position: Running back

Personal information
- Born: June 20, 1968 (age 58); Philadelphia, Mississippi, U.S.
- Listed height: 5 ft 10 in (1.78 m)
- Listed weight: 197 lb (89 kg)

Career information
- High school: Philadelphia (MS)
- College: Mississippi College
- NFL draft: 1991: 6th round, 154th overall pick

Career history
- New Orleans Saints (1991–1993); Arizona Cardinals (1994); Pittsburgh Steelers (1994–1998); Kansas City Chiefs (1999)*; Tampa Bay Buccaneers (1999); New Orleans Saints (2000–2006)
- * Offseason or practice squad member only

Awards and highlights
- First-team All-Pro (2002); Pro Bowl (2002); New Orleans Saints Hall of Fame

Career NFL statistics
- Rushing yards: 1,273
- Rushing average: 4.2
- Rushing touchdowns: 8
- Receptions: 35
- Receiving yards: 211
- Return yards: 2,412
- Stats at Pro Football Reference

Fred Lee McAfee (born June 20, 1968) is an American former professional football player who was a running back in the National Football League (NFL) He played for the New Orleans Saints, Arizona Cardinals, Pittsburgh Steelers and Tampa Bay Buccaneers.

== Early life ==
McAfee attended Philadelphia High School in Mississippi and was a student and a letterman in football & track. In football, he won All-District honors. In track, he was a two-time state champion in the pole vault. McAfee graduated high school in 1986.

Fred is a first cousin to legendary running back Marcus Dupree, and was the Philadelphia High School Football team's ball boy during Dupree's renowned years. A person featured in the ESPN "30 for 30" series about Marcus Dupree says that a young McAfee would give away or sell Dupree's torn game jerseys.

McAfee graduated with a degree in mass communication from Mississippi College in Clinton, Mississippi and played for the Choctaws football team in Division II. He set school records for rushing yards, attempts and rushing touchdowns. He led the Choctaws to the 1989 Gulf South Conference football champion, which was later vacated as punishment for recruiting violations, and earned All-American (D-II) honors.

== Professional career ==
McAfee was selected by the Saints in the 1991 NFL draft. He is the first player in Saints franchise history to be on the roster for three (1991, 2000, 2006) of the team's division titles. The 1991 season was his most prolific, offensively, as he rushed for a career-high 109 times for 494 yards and two touchdowns.

During the 1994 season, McAfee played for the Arizona Cardinals for seven games, then was released. On November 9, 1994, McAfee signed a contract with the Pittsburgh Steelers, who he would play for until the 1999 season, where he signed with the Kansas City Chiefs. While he was with the Steelers, he played in Super Bowl XXX, which the Steelers lost to the Dallas Cowboys 27–17.

However, less than a month after signing with the Chiefs, he was released. On December 28, 1999, McAfee signed with the Tampa Bay Buccaneers. During the 1999 season, McAfee played in only one game, and in October 2000, McAfee signed with the team that drafted him back in 1991, the New Orleans Saints. Throughout his second stint with the Saints, McAfee re-signed and declared free agency numerous times with the Saints. He was elected to go to the Pro Bowl in 2002 for his special team efforts. He was also known around the team for his tremendous work ethic, being a leader on and off the football field, and bringing a camaraderie to the locker room. During his second stint with the Saints, for 6 seasons, McAfee had only seven attempts for 117 yards. On August 28, 2006, McAfee was cut by the New Orleans Saints, thus making him a free agent eligible to sign with any NFL team. McAfee was re-signed by the Saints on November 21, 2006. On December 27, McAfee was waived by the Saints. Two days later, he was re-signed by the Saints and scored a touchdown on December 31, 2006, against the Carolina Panthers. This was McAfee's first NFL touchdown since October 26, 1998, which was on a blocked punt and his first rushing/offensive touchdown since September 10, 1995,

A few weeks later, on January 10, 2007, McAfee was placed on the Injured Reserve list by the Saints, reportedly to make roster room for newly signed place kicker Billy Cundiff. On May 25, 2007, the Saints announced they would hire him as director of player programs.

=== Career statistics ===
Rushing statistics

Year	Team	Games	Carries	Yards	Yards per carry	Longest carry	Touchdowns	First downs	Fumbles	Fumbles lost
1991	NO	9	109	494	4.5	34	2	23	0	0
1992	NO	14	39	114	2.9	19	1	8	0	0
1993	NO	15	51	160	3.1	27	1	7	1	1
1994	ARI	7	2	-5	-2.5	2	1	1	1	0
1994	PIT	6	16	56	3.5	13	1	5	0	0
1995	PIT	16	39	156	4.0	22	1	11	0	0
1996	PIT	14	7	17	2.4	5	0	0	0	0
1997	PIT	14	13	41	3.2	9	0	1	1	1
1998	PIT	14	18	111	6.2	14	0	5	0	0
2000	NO	12	2	37	18.5	40	0	1	0	0
2001	NO	16	1	2	2.0	2	0	0	0	0
2002	NO	11	1	11	11.0	11	0	1	0	0
2003	NO	14	1	13	13.0	13	0	1	0	0
2004	NO	11	2	54	27.0	53	0	1	0	0
2006	NO	4	3	12	4.0	6	1	1	0	0
Career		193	304	1,273	4.2	53	8	66	3	2

Receiving statistics

Year	Team	Games	Receptions	Yards	Yards per Reception	Longest Reception	Touchdowns	First Downs	Fumbles	Fumbles Lost
1991	NO	9	1	8	8.0	8	0	0	0	0
1992	NO	14	1	16	16.0	16	0	1	0	0
1993	NO	15	1	3	3.0	3	0	0	0	0
1994	ARI	7	1	4	4.0	4	0	0	0	0
1995	PIT	16	15	88	5.9	18	0	2	0	0
1996	PIT	14	5	21	4.2	9	0	1	0	0
1997	PIT	14	2	44	22.0	30	0	2	0	0
1998	PIT	14	9	27	3.0	11	0	1	0	0
Career		193	35	211	6.0	30	0	7	0	0

Kickoff return statistics

Year	Team	Games	Attempts	Yards	Touchdowns	Fair Catches	Longest Return
1991	NO	9	1	14	0	0	14
1992	NO	14	19	393	0	0	38
1993	NO	15	28	580	0	0	55
1994	ARI	7	7	113	0	0	29
1995	PIT	16	5	56	0	0	25
1998	PIT	14	1	10	0	0	25
2000	NO	12	10	251	0	0	52
2001	NO	16	6	144	0	0	34
2002	NO	11	2	69	0	0	51
2003	NO	14	9	140	0	0	23
2004	NO	11	8	137	0	0	26
2005	NO	16	22	485	0	0	34
2006	NO	4	1	20	0	0	20
Career		159	119	2,412	0	0	55
