= Willie Whitehead =

American gridiron football player (born 1973)

No. 95, 92, 98
- Position: Defensive end

Personal information
- Born: January 26, 1973 (age 53); Tuskegee, Alabama, U.S.
- Listed height: 6 ft 3 in (1.91 m)
- Listed weight: 300 lb (136 kg)

Career information
- College: Auburn
- NFL draft: 1995: undrafted

Career history
- San Franci sco 49ers (1995)*; Baltimore Stallions (1995); Hamilton Tiger-Cats (1997–1998); Detroit Lions (1998)*; Frankfurt Galaxy (1999); New Orleans Saints (1999–2006)
- * Offseason or practice squad member only

Awards and highlights
- Second-team All-SEC (1992)

Career NFL statistics
- Tackles: 216
- Sacks: 24.5
- Fumble recoveries: 3
- Stats at Pro Football Reference

Willie Whitehead Jr. (born January 26, 1973) is a former professional American and Canadian football defensive end who played for the New Orleans Saints of the National Football League (NFL). He walked-on to play college football with Auburn before winning a scholarship. He graduated with a Communications degree in 1994, garnering 65 tackles and five sacks his senior season.

== Professional career ==
Whitehead began his pro career signing as an undrafted free agent with the San Francisco 49ers for the 1995 season. After being cut by the 49ers, he split time between the CFL's Baltimore Stallions active roster and the 49ers practice squad. The following season, he played with the CFL's Montreal Alouettes and then in 1997 he led the Hamilton Tiger-Cats in sacks and added 44 tackles. After his strong showing in the CFL, Whitehead spent the 1998 training camp with the Detroit Lions before having a brief stint with the Frankfurt Galaxy of NFL Europe. In 1999, Whitehead found his place on a permanent NFL roster, earning a starting position with the New Orleans Saints, with whom he remained for the last eight seasons of his NFL career. He ended with the eighteenth most sacks amongst Saints players with 24.5 sacks. On June 15, 2007, the Saints released him.

== NFL career statistics ==
Legend
**Bold**	Career high

=== Regular season ===
Year	Team	Games		Tackles				Interceptions				Fumbles			
Year	Team	GP	GS	Comb	Solo	Ast	Sck	Int	Yds	TD	Lng	FF	FR	Yds	TD
1999	NOR	16	3	36	30	6	**7.0**	0	0	0	0	0	0	0	0
2000	NOR	16	2	27	17	10	5.5	0	0	0	0	**1**	0	0	0
2001	NOR	14	0	21	18	3	2.0	0	0	0	0	0	0	0	0
2002	NOR	12	10	34	24	10	3.0	0	0	0	0	0	**1**	0	0
2003	NOR	11	10	**40**	**33**	7	5.5	0	0	0	0	**1**	**1**	0	0
2004	NOR	8	0	10	6	4	0.0	0	0	0	0	0	0	0	0
2005	NOR	16	15	35	24	**11**	0.5	0	0	0	0	0	**1**	0	0
2006	NOR	12	3	13	9	4	1.0	0	0	0	0	0	0	0	0
		105	43	216	161	55	24.5	0	0	0	0	2	3	0	0

=== Playoffs ===
Year	Team	Games		Tackles				Interceptions				Fumbles			
Year	Team	GP	GS	Comb	Solo	Ast	Sck	Int	Yds	TD	Lng	FF	FR	Yds	TD
2000	NOR	2	0	**5**	**4**	**1**	**1.0**	0	0	0	0	**1**	0	0	0
2006	NOR	2	0	1	1	0	0.0	0	0	0	0	0	0	0	0
		4	0	6	5	1	1.0	0	0	0	0	1	0	0	0

== Personal ==
Whitehead and his father, Willie Whitehead Sr. are both members of Phi Beta Sigma fraternity.

Whitehead along with Ira Newble appeared together on an episode of The Real Housewives of Atlanta where they were dates at an auction.
