= Michael Hawthorne =

American football player (born 1977)

No. 36, 27
- Position: Cornerback

Personal information
- Born: January 26, 1977 (age 49); Sarasota, Florida, U.S.
- Listed height: 6 ft 3 in (1.91 m)
- Listed weight: 205 lb (93 kg)

Career information
- High school: Booker (Sarasota)
- College: Purdue
- NFL draft: 2000: 6th round, 195th overall pick

Career history
- New Orleans Saints (2000–2003); Green Bay Packers (2003–2004); St. Louis Rams (2005); Tampa Bay Storm (2010–2011)

Career NFL statistics
- Tackles: 177
- Interceptions: 4
- Passes defended: 17
- Stats at Pro Football Reference
- Stats at ArenaFan.com

Michael Seneca Hawthorne (born January 26, 1977) is an American former professional football player who was a cornerback in the National Football League (NFL). He played college football for the Purdue Boilermakers and was selected in the sixth round of the 2000 NFL draft. In the NFL, he played for the New Orleans Saints, Green Bay Packers, and St. Louis Rams.

== NFL career statistics ==
Legend
**Bold**	Career high

=== Regular season ===
Year	Team	Games		Tackles					Interceptions					Fumbles			
Year	Team	GP	GS	Cmb	Solo	Ast	Sck	TFL	Int	Yds	TD	Lng	PD	FF	FR	Yds	TD
2000	NOR	11	1	12	11	1	0.0	0	0	0	0	0	1	0	1	0	0
2001	NOR	11	2	22	19	3	0.0	0	0	0	0	0	0	0	0	0	0
2002	NOR	6	4	35	26	9	0.0	**1**	1	0	0	0	3	0	0	0	0
2003	GNB	14	2	32	25	7	**1.0**	**1**	**2**	8	0	8	5	0	0	0	0
2004	GNB	16	5	**51**	**38**	**13**	0.0	0	0	0	0	0	**7**	**2**	**2**	**34**	**1**
2005	STL	5	5	25	19	6	0.0	0	1	**24**	0	**24**	1	0	1	0	0
Career		63	19	177	138	39	1.0	2	4	32	0	24	17	2	4	34	1

=== Postseason ===
Year	Team	Games		Tackles					Interceptions					Fumbles			
Year	Team	GP	GS	Cmb	Solo	Ast	Sck	TFL	Int	Yds	TD	Lng	PD	FF	FR	Yds	TD
2000	NOR	2	1	3	2	**1**	0.0	0	0	0	0	0	0	0	0	0	0
2003	GNB	2	0	**4**	**4**	0	0.0	0	0	0	0	0	0	0	0	0	0
2004	GNB	1	0	3	3	0	**1.0**	0	0	0	0	0	**1**	0	0	0	0
Career		5	1	10	9	1	1.0	0	0	0	0	0	1	0	0	0	0
