= James Allen (linebacker) =

American football player (born 1979)

No. 50
- Position: Linebacker

Personal information
- Born: November 11, 1979 (age 46); Portland, Oregon, U.S.
- Listed height: 6 ft 2 in (1.88 m)
- Listed weight: 245 lb (111 kg)

Career information
- High school: Jefferson (Portland)
- College: Oregon State
- NFL draft: 2002: 3rd round, 82nd overall pick

Career history
- New Orleans Saints (2002–2006)

Career NFL statistics
- Tackles: 94
- Interceptions: 1
- Passes defended: 3
- Stats at Pro Football Reference

James Deshaune Allen (born November 11, 1979) is an American former professional football player who was a linebacker for the New Orleans Saints of the National Football League (NFL).

== Early life ==
Allen was born and raised in Portland, Oregon. He attended Jefferson High School in Portland where he excelled in football. He also was a very skilled saxophone player.

== College career ==
Allen chose to enroll at Oregon State University where he played linebacker under coach Dennis Erickson from 1997 to 2001. He was an integral member of the 2000 Beaver team that beat Notre Dame 41–9 in the 2001 Fiesta Bowl and finished 4th in the final AP poll.

== Professional career ==
Pre-draft measurables
Height	Weight	Arm length	Hand span	40-yard dash	10-yard split	20-yard split	20-yard shuttle	Three-cone drill	Vertical jump	Broad jump	Bench press
6 ft 2 5/8 in (1.90 m)	240 lb (109 kg)	33 in (0.84 m)	9 in (0.23 m)	4.65 s	1.66 s	2.72 s	4.21 s	7.59 s	38.0 in (0.97 m)	10 ft 6 in (3.20 m)	24 reps
All values from NFL Combine=

Allen was selected in the 3rd round (82nd overall) in the 2002 NFL draft by the New Orleans Saints. He played linebacker for the Saints from 2002 to 2006.

== NFL career statistics ==
Legend
**Bold**	Career high

Year	Team	Games		Tackles					Interceptions					Fumbles			
Year	Team	GP	GS	Cmb	Solo	Ast	Sck	TFL	Int	Yds	TD	Lng	PD	FF	FR	Yds	TD
2002	NOR	14	73121	741823	1321317	31232	3936.0	0	**131232**	0	**1**	0	**1**	1	1	48	2
2003	NOR	15	1	19	18	1	0.0	0	0	0	0	0	**1**	1	0	0	0
2004	NOR	**16**	**10**	**51**	**35**	**16**	0.0	0	0	0	0	0	**1**	**2**	**2**	**1**	0
2005	NOR	3	0	5	4	1	0.0	0	0	0	0	0	0	0	0	0000	0
Career		48	12	94	74	20	0.0	0	1	0	1	0	3	4	3	1	0
