= Michael Lewis (wide receiver) =

American football player and executive (born 1971)

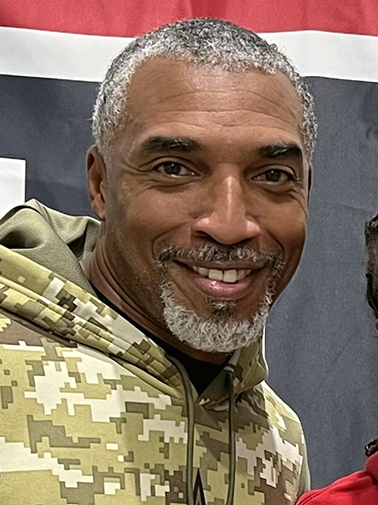
- Lewis in 2021

New Orleans Saints
- Title: Team ambassador

Personal information
- Born: November 14, 1971 (age 54); New Orleans, Louisiana, U.S.
- Listed height: 5 ft 8 in (1.73 m)
- Listed weight: 173 lb (78 kg)

Career information
- High school: Grace King (Metairie, Louisiana)
- College: None
- NFL draft: 2000: undrafted

Career history

Playing
- Louisiana Bayou Beast (1998); New Orleans Thunder (1999); Louisiana Bayou Beast (1999); New Jersey Red Dogs (2000); Philadelphia Eagles (2000)*; New Orleans Saints (2001–2006); → Rhein Fire (2001); San Francisco 49ers (2007); New Orleans VooDoo (2009)*
- * Offseason or practice squad member only

Operations
- New Orleans Saints (2009-present) Team ambassador

Awards and highlights
- First-team All-Pro (2002); Pro Bowl (2002); NFL kickoff return yards leader (2002); NFL punt return yards leader (2002); New Orleans Saints Hall of Fame; NFL records: Most combined kickoff and punt return yards in a season: 2,432 (2002); Most combined kickoff and punt returns in a season: 114 (2002; Tied with B.J Sams, 2004)

Career NFL statistics
- Receptions: 28
- Receiving yards: 553
- Receiving touchdown: 1
- Return yards: 7,807
- Return touchdowns: 4
- Stats at Pro Football Reference
- Stats at ArenaFan.com

Michael Lee Lewis (born November 14, 1971) is an American former professional football player who is the team ambassador of the New Orleans Saints of the National Football League (NFL). He played as a wide receiver and return specialist, earning first-team All-Pro honors and a Pro Bowl selection as a returner in 2002.

Lewis did not play college football, and was signed by the Louisiana Bayou Beast in 1998. He was also a member of the New Orleans Thunder, New Jersey Red Dogs, Philadelphia Eagles, New Orleans Saints, San Francisco 49ers and New Orleans VooDoo.

== Early life ==
Lewis graduated from Grace King High School in Metairie, Louisiana in 1990. Despite being a promising athlete, Lewis only played football during his freshman year before quitting to help his family with their rough financial situation by getting a job. He became a father during his senior year of high school and chose to focus on supporting his newborn child instead of playing football or going to college.

== Professional career ==
=== Early career ===
Prior to his pro football career, Lewis was a Budweiser beer truck driver (thus, the nickname "Beer Man") whose truck route was a short distance from the Mercedes-Benz Superdome. In his early 20's, a friend introduced Lewis to an amateur flag football league that was having open tryouts. After seeing extreme success in flag football, Lewis decided to pursue his dream of playing pro football and waded through the various semi-professional football leagues, pro indoor leagues, and the Arena Football League, amassing impressive stats that resulted in him getting invites to various NFL training camps.

=== Philadelphia Eagles ===
Lewis was signed by the Philadelphia Eagles during the preseason in 2000. He was cut before the regular season began.

=== New Orleans Saints ===
Lewis returned to his hometown to deliver beer locally. However, the New Orleans Saints signed Lewis at the end of the 2000 NFL regular season. The Saints sent Lewis to play for the Rhein Fire of NFL Europe in 2001.

Lewis was the Saints' feature return specialist from 2002 until September 19, 2005, during a game against the New York Giants at the Meadowlands, when he injured his MCL and was put on injured reserve for the rest of the season. Lewis returned to play for the Saints on October 29, 2006, during a home game against the Baltimore Ravens.

In 2002, Lewis set an NFL record for combined kick-punt return yardage with 2,432 yards total (1,807 kickoff, 625 punt), leading the league in punt return yards, kickoff return yards, and all-purpose yards. He is currently the Saints' all-time career leader in punt returns (142) and punt return yardage (1,482).

On December 21, 2003, he also played a role in the River City Relay as one of the receivers that would lateral a touchdown in a last second attempt to win the game against the Jacksonville Jaguars (in which the Saints lost). The River City Relay won an ESPY, NFL play of the year, and an ESPN.com internet poll.

In April 2006 Lewis returned to the Saints after recovering from a knee injury.

The Saints released Lewis on June 15, 2007. The local New Orleans newspaper, the Times-Picayune, titled the news, "There's a Tear in My Beer".

=== San Francisco 49ers ===
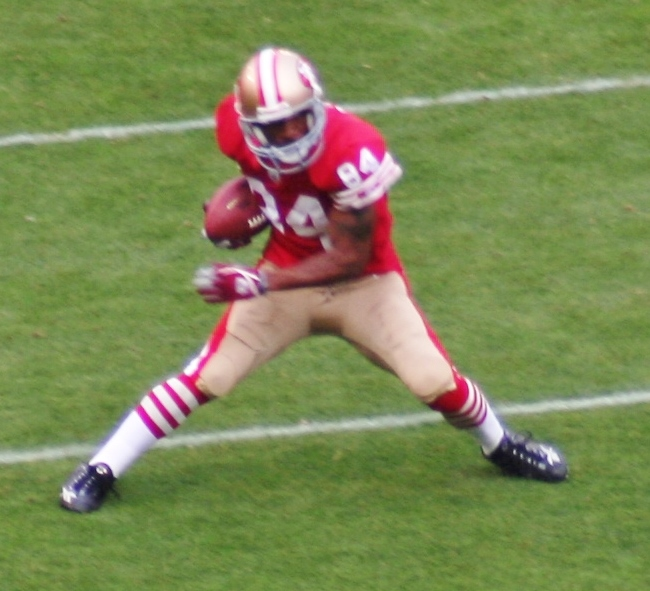
Lewis with the 49ers in 2007

On September 25, 2007, the San Francisco 49ers signed Lewis to take over punt return duties. The incumbent punt returner, Brandon Williams, was released.

=== New Orleans VooDoo ===
Lewis signed a contract with the New Orleans VooDoo on October 10, 2008. Team officials were preparing to make the announcement the following week, but the owner (Tom Benson, also the owner of the New Orleans Saints) decided to terminate operations on October 13, 2008.

=== Post-retirement ===
Lewis subsequently took a position as a "Team Ambassador" for the Saints. Though no longer an active player, Lewis was awarded a Super Bowl ring after the Saints won Super Bowl XLIV in recognition of his continuing role with the team. Lewis was selected for the Saints Hall of Fame in 2015. In 2019, it was announced that biopic about Michael Lewis's life was being produced under the name "The Beer Man" with Aldis Hodge attached to the lead role.

== NFL career statistics ==
Receiving Stats

Year	Team	GP	Rec	Yds	Avg	Lng	TD	FD	Fum	Lost
2002	NO	16	8	200	25.0	59	0	4	1	1
2003	NO	13	12	226	18.8	39	1	10	0	0
2004	NO	14	8	127	15.9	30	0	7	0	0
Total		43	28	553	19.8	59	1	21	1	1

Returning Stats

Year	Team	GP	PR	Yds	TD	FC	Lng	KR	Yds	TD	FC	Lng
2001	NO	8	14	81	0	0	32	32	762	0	0	68
2002	NO	16	44	625	1	6	83	70	1,807	2	0	97
2003	NO	13	30	275	0	10	27	45	1,068	0	0	53
2004	NO	14	34	382	0	11	53	51	1,215	1	0	96
2005	NO	2	4	8	0	0	5	8	137	0	0	20
2006	NO	10	16	111	0	10	26	37	914	0	0	51
2007	SF	13	44	336	0	4	51	5	86	0	0	24
Total		76	186	1,818	1	41	83	248	5,989	3	0	97

=== Awards and honors ===
- New Orleans Saints Hall of Fame (2015)
- 2011 American Football Association Semi Pro Hall of Fame
- 2004 NFC Special Teams Player of the Week (Week 16)
- 2002 NFL Pro Bowl
- Associated Press First-team All-Pro
- 2002 NFC Special Teams Player of the Week (Week 6)
- NFL Alumni Special Teams Player of the Year
- Sports Illustrated All-Pro
- College & Pro Football Newsweekly First-team All-Pro
- Pro Football Weekly All-NFL and All-NFC
- Football Digest First-team All-Pro
- The Sporting News All-Pro
- 2000 AFL All-Rookie Team
- 1998 PIFL All-Star First-team
