= 2002 All-Pro Team =

Official list of the best NFL players in 2002

The 2002 All-Pro Team comprises the National Football League players that were named to the Associated Press, Pro Football Writers Association, and The Sporting News All-Pro Teams in 2002. Both first and second teams are listed for the AP team. These are the three teams that are included in Total Football II: The Official Encyclopedia of the National Football League. In 2002 the Pro Football Writers Association and Pro Football Weekly combined their All-pro teams, a practice with continues through 2008. In 2001 the AP did not have a separate “fullback” position. Also, in 2001, the AP returned to choosing two inside linebackers, rather than one.

== Teams ==
Offense
Position	First team	Second team
Quarterback	Rich Gannon, Oakland Raiders (AP, PFWA, TSN)	Brett Favre, Green Bay Packers (AP-2)
Running back	Ricky Williams, Miami Dolphins (AP, PFWA, TSN); Priest Holmes, Kansas City Chiefs (AP, PFWA, TSN)	LaDainian Tomlinson, San Diego Chargers (AP-2); Fred Beasley, San Francisco 49ers (AP-2)
Wide receiver	Terrell Owens, San Francisco 49ers (AP, PFWA, TSN); Marvin Harrison, Indianapolis Colts (AP, PFWA, TSN)	Hines Ward, Pittsburgh Steelers (AP-2); Eric Moulds, Buffalo Bills (AP-2t); Jerry Rice, Oakland Raiders (AP-2t)
Tight end	Jeremy Shockey, New York Giants (AP); Tony Gonzalez, Kansas City Chiefs (PFWA, TSN)	Tony Gonzalez, Kansas City Chiefs (AP-2)
Tackle	Jonathan Ogden, Baltimore Ravens (AP, PFWA, TSN); Lincoln Kennedy, Oakland Raiders (AP); Tra Thomas, Philadelphia Eagles (TSN); Walter Jones, Seattle Seahawks (PFWA)	Tra Thomas, Philadelphia Eagles (AP-2); Willie Roaf, Kansas City Chiefs (AP-2)
Guard	Alan Faneca, Pittsburgh Steelers (AP, PFWA, TSN); Will Shields, Kansas City Chiefs (AP, PFWA, TSN)	Ruben Brown, Buffalo Bills (AP-2); Jermane Mayberry, Philadelphia Eagles (AP-2)
Center	Barret Robbins, Oakland Raiders (AP); Kevin Mawae, New York Jets (PFWA, TSN)	Kevin Mawae, New York Jets (AP-2)

Special teams
Position	First team	Second team
Kicker	Adam Vinatieri, New England Patriots (AP, PFWA); David Akers, Philadelphia Eagles (TSN)	David Akers, Philadelphia Eagles (AP-2)
Punter	Todd Sauerbrun, Carolina Panthers (AP, PFWA, TSN)	Chris Hanson, Jacksonville Jaguars (AP-2)
Kick Returner	Michael Lewis, New Orleans Saints (AP, PFWA, TSN)	Dante Hall, Kansas City Chiefs (AP-2)
Punt Returner	Santana Moss, New York Jets (PFWA, TSN)	
Special Teams	Fred McAfee, New Orleans Saints (PFWA)	

Defense
Position	First team	Second team
Defensive end	Simeon Rice, Tampa Bay Buccaneers (AP, PFWA, TSN); Jason Taylor, Miami Dolphins (AP, PFWA, TSN)	Hugh Douglas, Philadelphia Eagles (AP-2); Michael Strahan, New York Giants (AP-2)
Defensive tackle	Kris Jenkins, Carolina Panthers (AP); Warren Sapp, Tampa Bay Buccaneers (AP, PFWA, TSN); La'Roi Glover, Dallas Cowboys (PFWA, TSN)	Chris Hovan, Minnesota Vikings (AP-2); La’Roi Glover, Dallas Cowboys (AP-2)
Inside linebacker	Zach Thomas, Miami Dolphins (AP); Brian Urlacher, Chicago Bears (AP, PFWA, TSN)	Donnie Edwards, San Diego Chargers (AP-2); Keith Brooking, Atlanta Falcons (AP-2)
Outside linebacker	Joey Porter, Pittsburgh Steelers (AP, PFWA, TSN); Derrick Brooks, Tampa Bay Buccaneers (AP, PFWA, TSN)	Julian Peterson, San Francisco 49ers (AP-2); Keith Bulluck, Tennessee Titans (AP-2)
Cornerback	Patrick Surtain, Miami Dolphins (AP, PFWA, TSN); Troy Vincent, Philadelphia Eagles (AP); Bobby Taylor, Philadelphia Eagles (PFWA); Aaron Glenn, Houston Texans (TSN)	Rondé Barber, Tampa Bay Buccaneers (AP-2); Bobby Taylor, Philadelphia Eagles (AP-2)
Safety	Rod Woodson, Oakland Raiders (AP, PFWA); Brian Dawkins, Philadelphia Eagles (AP, PFWA, TSN); Darren Sharper, Green Bay Packers (TSN)	Darren Sharper, Green Bay Packers (AP-2); John Lynch, Tampa Bay Buccaneers (AP-2)

== Key ==
- AP = Associated Press first-team All-Pro
- AP-2 = Associated Press second-team All-Pro
- AP-2t = Tied for second-team All-Pro in the AP vote
- PFWA = Pro Football Writers Association All-NFL
- TSN = The Sporting News All-Pro
