= Chase Lyman =

American football player (born 1982)

No. 15
- Position: Wide receiver

Personal information
- Born: September 4, 1982 (age 44); Mountain View, California, U.S.
- Listed height: 6 ft 4 in (1.93 m)
- Listed weight: 210 lb (95 kg)

Career information
- High school: Saint Francis (Mountain View, California)
- College: California (2000–2004)
- NFL draft: 2005: 4th round, 118th overall pick

Career history
- New Orleans Saints (2005–2006)

Chase Lyman (born September 4, 1982) is an American former professional football wide receiver.

Lyman was raised in Los Altos Hills, CA and is the son of former NFL player Brad Lyman. He attended Saint Francis High School in Mountain View, California where he played football, basketball, and ran track. The San Jose Mercury News named Lyman their Male Athlete of the Year in 2000. The San Jose Sports Hall of Fame awarded him their Outstanding Male High School Athlete of the Year in 2000.

Despite his success in high school athletics, Lyman received only one scholarship offer, to the University of California. Lyman became a key component of the Cal offense. In his junior year, he was a main target for Cal quarterback Aaron Rodgers. Initially wearing #81, he later switched to #15. He graduated with a degree in American Studies in 2004.

Pre-draft measurables
Height	Weight	Arm length	Hand span	40-yard dash	10-yard split	20-yard split	Vertical jump	Broad jump
6 ft 2 5/8 in (1.90 m)	217 lb (98 kg)	31 3/4 in (0.81 m)	9 7/8 in (0.25 m)	4.54 s	1.60 s	2.65 s	36.5 in (0.93 m)	9 ft 7 in (2.92 m)
All values from NFL Combine/Pro Day

Lyman was drafted by the New Orleans Saints in the fourth round of the 2005 NFL draft.
