= Dave Atkins (American football) =

American football player and coach (born 1949)

No. 29, 28, 26
- Position: Running back

Personal information
- Born: May 18, 1949 (age 77); Victoria, Texas, U.S.
- Listed height: 6 ft 1 in (1.85 m)
- Listed weight: 205 lb (93 kg)

Career information
- College: UTEP
- NFL draft: 1973: 8th round, 201st overall pick

Career history

Playing
- San Francisco 49ers (1973–1974); San Diego Chargers (1975)

Coaching
- UTEP (1979–1980) Running backs coach; San Diego State (1981–1985) Running backs coach; Philadelphia Eagles (1986–1990) Running backs coach; Philadelphia Eagles (1991) Special Teams coordinator; Philadelphia Eagles (1992) Tight Ends coach; New England Patriots (1993) Running backs coach; Arizona Cardinals (1994–1995) Offensive Coordinator; New Orleans Saints (1996) Running backs coach; Minnesota Vikings (1997–1999) Tight Ends coach; New Orleans Saints (2000–2004) Running backs coach; Cleveland Browns (2005–2006) Running backs coach; Los Angeles Wildcats (2020) Running backs coach

Career NFL statistics
- Rushing attempts: 5
- Rushing yards: 23
- Rushing TDs: 1
- Stats at Pro Football Reference
- Coaching profile at Pro Football Reference

Dave Atkins (born May 18, 1949) is an American football coach and former running back. Atkins was the 19th pick in the 8th round of the 1973 NFL draft. He joined the San Francisco 49ers for the 1973 and 1974 seasons before moving to the San Diego Chargers for the 1975 season.

== Coaching career ==
After Atkins finished his pro playing career, he moved into coaching. He had spells as offensive coordinator for the Arizona Cardinals and was the senior offensive assistant coach for the Cleveland Browns for two seasons, 2005 - 2007.

A longtime assistant coach, usually coaching running backs, he had various success coaching skill position players and coordinating offenses. 1986 RB Keith Byars ran for 577 yards with 1 touchdown. In 1987, Byars and FB Anthony Toney would combine to run for 899 yards with 8 touchdowns. In 1988, the same duo would combine for 1,019 yards and 10 touchdowns on the ground. In 1989, the tandem of Byars & Toney would be even better running for 1,034 yards and 8 touchdowns. In 1990, RB/FB Heath Sherman took over for Byars and his combination with Toney ran for 1,137 yards and 2 touchdowns. In 1992, Atkins took over the tight ends and helped Pat Beach into a solid run blocker as the team helped Herschel Walker and Heath Sherman run for a combined 1,653 yards.

Dave Atkins would join the New England Patriots for the 1993 NFL season. He would help guide Leonard Russell to 1,088 yards with 7 touchdowns.

The next year, Atkins would go to the Arizona Cardinals as their offensive coordinator. Despite some struggles in 1994, quarterbacks Steve Beuerlein and Jay Schroeder combined to throw for 3,055 yards with 9 touchdowns. FB Larry Centers had 647 yards receiving. The offense improved in 1995 with quarterback Dave Krieg throwing for 3,554 yards and 16 touchdowns. RB Garrison Hearst also ran for 1,070 yards with 1 touchdown and 3 players: Larry Centers, Rob Moore, and Frank Sanders finished with over 880 yards receiving.

Atkins would go to the New Orleans Saints for a single season in 1996. RB Mario Bates and FB Ray Zellars would combine to run for 1,059 yards with 8 touchdowns despite the team going 3–13 on the year.

Returning to the New Orleans Saints in 2000, Atkins would be instrumental in the development of Ricky Williams in 2000 & 2001 (1,000 yards and 8 touchdowns then 1,245 yards and 6 touchdowns) and Deuce McAllister in 2002-2004 (4,103 yards and 30 touchdowns on the ground over that 3-year span).

Before retiring, Atkins would coach with the Cleveland Browns in 2005 and 2006. He would guide Reuben Droughns to 1,232 yards and 2 touchdowns in 2005 and 758 yards and 4 touchdowns in 2006.

In 2019, he became running backs coach for the Los Angeles Wildcats of the XFL.
