= Kendyl Jacox =

American football player (born 1975)

No. 64
- Positions: Guard, center

Personal information
- Born: June 10, 1975 (age 51); Dallas, Texas, U.S.
- Listed height: 6 ft 2 in (1.88 m)
- Listed weight: 325 lb (147 kg)

Career information
- High school: David W. Carter (Dallas)
- College: Kansas State
- NFL draft: 1998: undrafted

Career history
- San Diego Chargers (1998–2001); New Orleans Saints (2002–2005); Miami Dolphins (2006)

Awards and highlights
- First-team All-Big 12 (1997)

Career NFL statistics
- Games played: 130
- Games started: 93
- Fumble recoveries: 3
- Stats at Pro Football Reference

Kendyl LeMarc Jacox (born June 10, 1975) is an American former professional football player who was an offensive guard in the National Football League (NFL). He played college football for the Kansas State Wildcats.

Jacox appeared in 58 games for the San Diego Chargers between 1998 and 2001, including 30 starts. After signing with the New Orleans Saints in 2002, Jacox appeared in 56 games - starting all but one - between 2002 and 2005.

After a rash of injuries at the right guard position during training camp and preseason, the Miami Dolphins signed Jacox as a free agent on September 3, 2006.
