= Curtis Holden =

American football player (born 1979)

No. 57
- Position: Linebacker

Personal information
- Born: March 17, 1979 (age 47); San Francisco, California, U.S.
- Listed height: 6 ft 2 in (1.88 m)
- Listed weight: 232 lb (105 kg)

Career information
- High school: J. Eugene McAteer (San Francisco, California)
- College: CCSF (1997–1998); Washington State (1999–2000)
- NFL draft: 2001: undrafted

Career history
- New Orleans Saints (2001–2003)

Career NFL statistics
- Tackles: 7
- Stats at Pro Football Reference

Curtis Holden (born March 17, 1979) is an American former professional football linebacker. He played college football for the City College of San Francisco Rams and Washington State Cougars. After college, he played one season in the National Football League (NFL) for the New Orleans Saints. He appeared in 12 games.
