= Mel Mitchell =

American football player (born 1979)

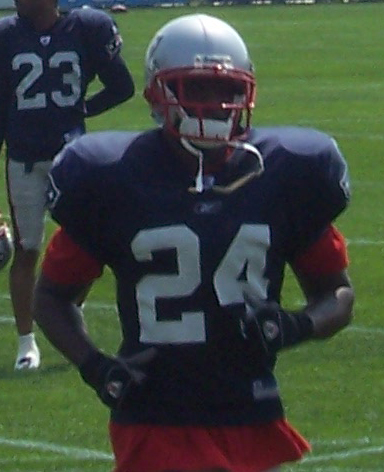

No. 40, 24
- Position: Safety

Personal information
- Born: February 10, 1979 (age 47); Rockledge, Florida, U.S.
- Listed height: 6 ft 1 in (1.85 m)
- Listed weight: 225 lb (102 kg)

Career information
- High school: Rockledge
- College: Western Kentucky
- NFL draft: 2002: 5th round, 150th overall pick

Career history
- New Orleans Saints (2002–2005); New England Patriots (2006–2007)

Career NFL statistics
- Total tackles: 57
- Stats at Pro Football Reference

Mel Mitchell III (born February 10, 1979) is an American former professional football player who was a safety in the National Football League (NFL). He played college football for the Western Kentucky Hilltoppers and was selected by the New Orleans Saints in the fifth round of the 2002 NFL draft.

Mitchell also played for the New England Patriots.

== College career ==
At Western Kentucky University, Mitchell started all 36 games and totaling 288 tackles, seven interceptions, 1.5 sacks, 21 passes defensed, and returned 20 kickoffs. He majored in physical education.
