= Deuce McAllister =

American football player (born 1978)

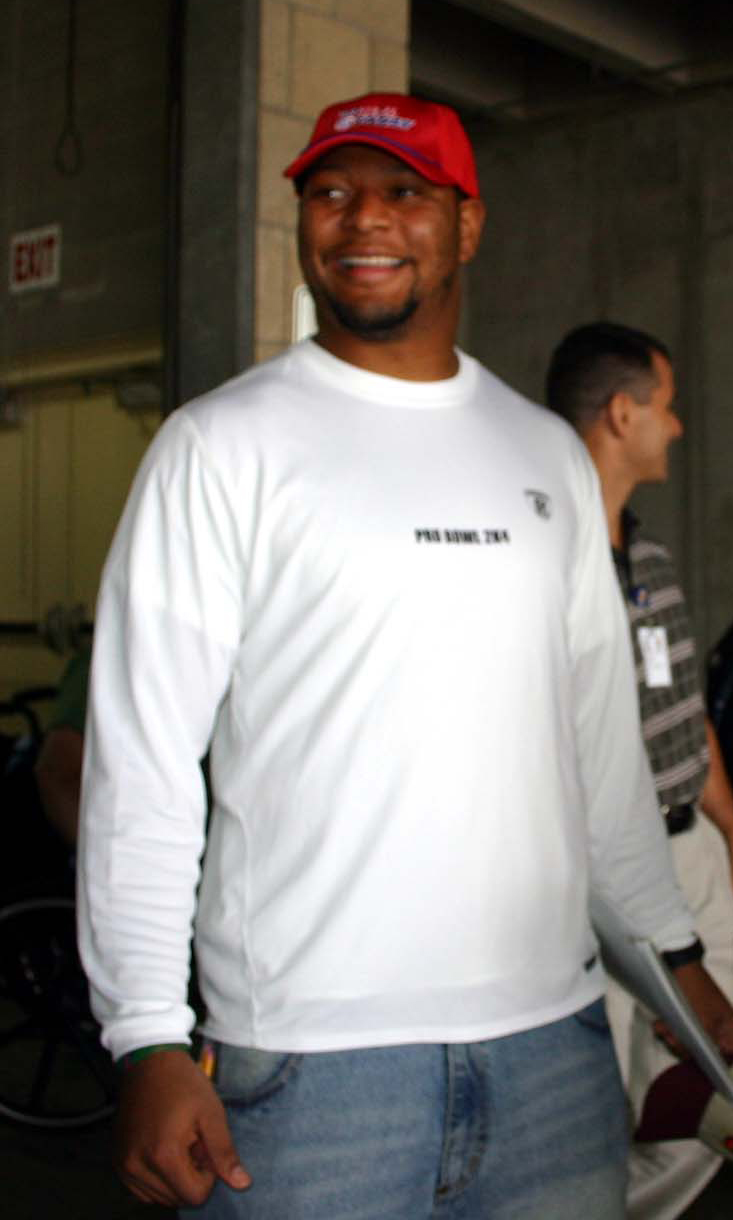
- McAllister in 2005

No. 26
- Position: Running back

Personal information
- Born: December 27, 1978 (age 47); Lena, Mississippi, U.S.
- Listed height: 6 ft 1 in (1.85 m)
- Listed weight: 232 lb (105 kg)

Career information
- High school: Morton (Morton, Mississippi)
- College: Ole Miss (1997–2000)
- NFL draft: 2001: 1st round, 23rd overall pick

Career history
- New Orleans Saints (2001–2009)

Awards and highlights
- Super Bowl champion (XLIV); 2× Pro Bowl (2002, 2003); New Orleans Saints Hall of Fame; 2× First-team All-SEC (1999, 2000); Second-team All-SEC (1998)

Career NFL statistics
- Rushing attempts: 1,429
- Rushing yards: 6,096
- Rushing touchdowns: 49
- Receptions: 234
- Receiving yards: 1,720
- Receiving touchdowns: 5
- Stats at Pro Football Reference

Dulymus Jenod "Deuce" McAllister (born December 27, 1978) is an American former professional football player who was a running back for eight seasons with the New Orleans Saints in the National Football League (NFL). He played college football for the Ole Miss Rebels and was selected by the Saints in the first round of the 2001 NFL draft. McAllister was selected to two Pro Bowls in his career.

McAllister is currently a color commentator for the Saints on radio flagship WWL (AM), having taken over from Hokie Gajan in June 2016, as well as for college football games on SEC Network. He also serves as an athletic consultant for St. Martin's Episcopal School.

== College career ==
McAllister played college football for the University of Mississippi (Ole Miss). He had a record-breaking career for the Rebels. McAllister is the only player in the history of Ole Miss to record three seasons with at least 1,000 all-purpose yards. He finished his college career with Ole Miss records for carries (616), yards (3,060), rushing touchdowns (36), total touchdowns (41) points (246) and 100-yard games (13).

== Professional career ==
Pre-draft measurables
Height	Weight	Arm length	Hand span	40-yard dash	10-yard split	20-yard split	Vertical jump	Bench press
6 ft 1 1/8 in (1.86 m)	222 lb (101 kg)	31 1/2 in (0.80 m)	9 1/8 in (0.23 m)	4.41 s	1.50 s	2.52 s	37 1/2 in (0.95 m)	20 reps
All values from NFL Combine

McAllister was selected by the Saints in the first round (23rd overall) of the 2001 NFL draft. He became the starting running back after Ricky Williams was traded in 2002. He went on to rush for over 1,000 yards in three straight seasons (a first in Saints' history). As of 2005, he ranks first in team record books with 5,586 rushing yards and 44 touchdowns and is first with 22 100-yard games, including a franchise-record nine straight contests in 2003. The Saints were 14-8 when he rushed for 100 yards in a single game, and McAllister has added 212 receptions for 1,577 yards and four touchdowns.

McAllister threw a touchdown pass on December 9, 2001, vs. the Atlanta Falcons. In 2003, he finished second in the NFC in rushing and fourth in the league with a career-high 1,641 yards on 351 carries which is second in club history (RB George Rogers, 1,674 yards, 1981). Including the 516 yards on a career-high 69 receptions, McAllister posted 2,157 yards that season to set a club record and rank second in the NFC. All of these accomplishments were an encore to 2002, when in his first year as a starter he led the conference with 1,388 rushing yards, scored 16 touchdowns and was voted to the Pro Bowl.

McAllister was placed on injured reserve on October 10, 2005, after suffering a torn anterior cruciate ligament in his right knee, and returned to the roster for the 2006 season. While Deuce remained the starter, he shared time in the backfield for the first time in his career with the Saints' first-round draft pick Reggie Bush. In his first-ever play-off start (January 16, 2007) McAllister rushed for 143 yards on 21 carries with one touchdown and had 4 catches for 20 yards and another touchdown as New Orleans defeated Philadelphia, 27–24 to earn its first-ever NFC Championship Game appearance in the team's 40-year history.

On September 24, 2007, during a game against the Tennessee Titans, McAllister tore his ACL in his left knee. The injury resulted in McAllister being placed on injured reserve, thereby missing the remainder of the 2007 season. McAllister returned to action on September 14, 2008, against the Washington Redskins, carrying the ball twice for 10 yards. McAllister scored his first rushing touchdown in a regular season game since December 24, 2006, in the September 28, 2008, game against the San Francisco 49ers.

McAllister set the all-time rushing touchdown record for the New Orleans Saints with a score against the Green Bay Packers on November 24, 2008.

The Saints released McAllister on February 17, 2009, due to salary cap problems.

After sitting out the entire 2009 regular season, McAllister was re-signed by the Saints on January 15, 2010—just one day before their divisional round playoff game against the Arizona Cardinals, to serve as the honorary captain. "Deuce McAllister has always embodied the spirit of the New Orleans Saints and the city of New Orleans," Saints head Coach Sean Payton said in a statement regarding McAllister rejoining the team. "We’re excited to have him back with the team and to have him lead us out on to the field tomorrow." Less than a week later, however, McAllister announced his plan to formally retire from the NFL at the conclusion of the playoffs. Although he did not play, McAllister was on the Saints' roster when they defeated the Colts in Super Bowl XLIV, and was also given a championship ring.

McAllister was one of the players that tested positive for an ingredient found in the weight loss product Star Caps, though he retired well before the matter was officially resolved in April 2011.

== NFL career statistics ==
Year	Team	Games		Rushing					Receiving					Fumbles	
Year	Team	GP	GS	Att	Yds	Avg	Lng	TD	Rec	Yds	Avg	Lng	TD	Fum	Lost
2001	NO	16	4	16	91	5.7	54T	1	15	166	11.1	22T	1	1	0
2002	NO	15	15	325	1,388	4.3	62	13	47	352	7.5	30	3	4	3
2003	NO	16	16	351	1,641	4.7	76T	8	69	516	7.5	39	0	6	4
2004	NO	14	14	269	1,074	4.0	71	9	34	228	6.7	20	0	5	4
2005	NO	5	5	93	335	3.6	26	3	17	117	6.9	22	0	—	—
2006	NO	15	13	244	1,057	4.3	57	10	30	198	6.6	24	0	3	1
2007	NO	3	3	24	92	3.8	15	0	4	15	3.8	7	0	1	1
2008	NO	13	6	107	418	3.9	19	5	18	128	7.1	20	1	—	—
Career		97	76	1,429	6,096	4.3	76	49	234	1,720	7.4	39	5	20	13

== Personal life ==
McAllister runs the Catch 22 Foundation, which is dedicated to under-privileged youth and adolescents in the Gulf South Region. He previously owned Deuce McAllister Nissan, a car dealership in Jackson, Mississippi, which filed for Chapter 11 bankruptcy in 2009. He was sued by Nissan Finance, which alleged that the dealership had defaulted on its payments. McAllister's Louisiana home was auctioned off by the Sheriff's office shortly after.

In 2012, a settlement with Nissan was ordered by a judge, however in January 2013, Nissan again sued claiming McAllister still has not paid the settlement claim.

McAllister filed a civil suit against Razzoo Bar and Patio, a Bourbon Street nightclub, after a Mardi Gras 2004 incident in which he claimed he was assaulted by the club's bouncers. The two sides came to a confidential settlement in 2009.

In March 2017, St. Martin's Episcopal School announced that McAllister joined its athletic department as an athletic consultant.

As of 2010, McAllister lived in Metairie, Louisiana.

On July 19, 2018, New Orleans' Fox affiliates WVUE-TV announced that McAllister would join the station as a Saints analyst in addition to his WWL Radio duties, replacing the retired Jim Henderson. He also owns and operates the Ole Saint restaurant and sports bar chain with locations at 132 Royal Street in the French Quarter of New Orleans and in Boomtown Casino on the Gulf Coast in Biloxi, Mississippi.

McAllister was inducted as an honoris causa initiate into Omicron Delta Kappa at the University of Holy Cross in 2020.
