= Kevin Houser =

American football player (born 1977)

No. 47, 45, 70
- Position: Long snapper

Personal information
- Born: August 23, 1977 (age 49); Westlake, Ohio, U.S.
- Listed height: 6 ft 2 in (1.88 m)
- Listed weight: 252 lb (114 kg)

Career information
- High school: Westlake
- College: Ohio State
- NFL draft: 2000: 7th round, 228th overall pick

Career history
- New Orleans Saints (2000–2008); Seattle Seahawks (2009); Baltimore Ravens (2010)

Career NFL statistics
- Games played: 159
- Total tackles: 22
- Stats at Pro Football Reference

Kevin J. Houser (born August 23, 1977) is an American former professional football player who was a long snapper in the National Football League (NFL). He was selected by the New Orleans Saints in the seventh round of the 2000 NFL draft. He played college football for the Ohio State Buckeyes.

== Early life ==
Houser attended Westlake High School in Westlake, Ohio, where he played football, basketball, and track. In football, he was a tight end, defensive end, and longsnapper, and ended his career with 38 receptions, and 273 tackles.

== College career ==
Houser graduated from Ohio State University with a degree in Finance. During college, he was a four-year letterman for the Ohio State Football team where he played tight end and long snapper. He was the third member of his family to play at Ohio State, following father, Tom (1969–1972), and brother Bob (1993–1996).

== Professional career ==
=== New Orleans Saints ===
Houser was selected by the New Orleans Saints in the seventh round (228th overall) of the 2000 NFL draft. As of June 2009, no current player had been with the Saints longer. He was the starting long-snapper and a contributor on punt coverages.

=== Seattle Seahawks ===
The Seattle Seahawks signed Houser as a free agent on July 23, 2009. He was placed on injured reserve on December 22.

=== Baltimore Ravens ===
On December 29, 2010, Houser was signed by the Baltimore Ravens to immediately replace Morgan Cox, who was placed on injured reserve after their game against the Cleveland Browns on December 26. Houser would take over as the long snapper for the Ravens to take them through their 2010 season.

== Personal life ==
Houser is married to Kristen Houser and they have two children, daughter Julia, and son Michael. Houser and his wife, cofounded the Life's a Snap charity foundation that provides financial assistance and services to establish and maintain programs which benefit children with serious or life-threatening illnesses. According to a June 11, 2013 Washington Post report, Houser is being sued by his former teammate Drew Brees for advising him to invest $160,000 in tax credits that turned out to be bogus. The suit is filed in federal court claims the former long snapper, a licensed securities broker, mishandled Brees' money and failed to disclose his own financial interests in the investments he was promoting. Several other Saints players and coaches have also sued Houser. All extant lawsuits have since been settled out of court.
