= Mickey Loomis =

American football executive (born 1956)

New Orleans Saints
- Title: Executive vice president/general manager

Personal information
- Born: December 1956 (age 69)

Career information
- High school: Willamette (Eugene, Oregon)
- College: Northwest Christian University; University of Oregon (Bachelors); Wichita State University (Masters)

Career history
- Seattle Seahawks (1983–1998); Business manager (1983–1989); Vice president of finance (1990–1991); Executive vice president (1992–1998); New Orleans Saints (2000–present); Director of football administration (2000–2001); General manager (2002–2012); Executive vice president/general manager (2013–present); New Orleans Pelicans (2012–2019) Executive vice president of basketball operations; New Orleans Saints

Awards and highlights
- Super Bowl champion (XLIV); PFWA Executive of the Year (2006)
- Executive profile at Pro Football Reference

Mickey Loomis (born December 1956) is an American professional football executive who is the executive vice president and general manager of the New Orleans Saints of the National Football League (NFL). He was named the 2006 PFWA Executive of the Year. From 2012 to 2019, he was also head of basketball operations for the New Orleans Pelicans of the National Basketball Association (NBA).

Loomis grew up in Eugene, Oregon, and graduated from Willamette High School in 1974, then attended Northwest Christian University in Eugene, where he played basketball. He earned his degree in accounting from the University of Oregon and a master's degree in sports administration from Wichita State University. Before coming to the Saints, Loomis spent 15 years in the Seattle Seahawks organization. Loomis joined the Saints in 2000 and became general manager in 2002. He was with the Saints when they were forced to relocate to Baton Rouge in the wake of Hurricane Katrina, and helped rebuild the team afterward, culminating in its victory in Super Bowl XLIV.

Loomis was one of the Saints officials to be penalized in 2012 in the aftermath of the New Orleans Saints bounty scandal, in which an NFL investigation found that players were paid bonuses from a pool for their on-field performance, including, allegedly, deliberately trying to knock opposing players out of games. A league investigation found that Saints team owner Tom Benson had ordered Loomis to shut the program down, but Loomis failed to do so. As a result, Loomis was suspended for the first 8 games of the 2012 NFL season.

In April 2012, ESPN's Outside the Lines reported allegations that Loomis had an illegal eavesdropping device that allowed him to listen to real-time playcalls of opposing coaches during the 2002–2004 seasons. Loomis denied the allegation, calling the report "absolutely false", and in August 2012, the Louisiana State Police announced that a four-month investigation had found no evidence to corroborate the allegations.

In June 2012, Loomis was named head of basketball operations for the Hornets after Tom Benson bought the team. He served in this capacity from 2012 to 2019.
