= Jack Henry (American football) =

American football player and coach (born 1946)

Biographical details
- Born: March 14, 1946 (age 80); Wilmerding, Pennsylvania

Playing career
- 1967–1968: IUP
- Position: Offensive guard

Coaching career (HC unless noted)
- 1969: Blairsville HS (PA) (assistant)
- 1970: West Virginia (freshman OL)
- 1973: Edinboro (OL)
- 1975–1976: Millersville (OC)
- 1977: Southern Illinois (OL)
- 1978–1979: West Virginia (OL)
- 1980: Appalachian State (OC)
- 1981–1985: Wake Forest (OL)
- 1986–1989: IUP (OC)
- 1990–1991: Pittsburgh Steelers (OL)
- 1993–1995: Pittsburgh (OL)
- 1997–1999: Detroit Lions (OL)
- 2000–2004: New Orleans Saints (OL)
- 2005: New Orleans Saints (AHC/RGC/OL)
- 2006–2008: San Diego Chargers (OL)

John Henry (also known as "Jack Henry") (born March 14, 1946) is an American former football coach. His National Football League (NFL) coaching career began with the Pittsburgh Steelers during Chuck Noll's final two seasons as head coach (1990–91).

== Biography ==
Prior to his NFL career, Henry was a college coach for twenty-one years with stops at West Virginia University, Wake Forest University, and Indiana University of Pennsylvania (IUP), his alma mater. Henry also coached for three years on the high school level. He is a graduate of Chartiers Houston High School in Houston, Pennsylvania and IUP. He holds a master of science degree from West Virginia University.

After Henry's time with the Pittsburgh Steelers, Henry moved on to coach at the University of Pittsburgh (1993–1995) and with the Detroit Lions (1997–1999). While in Detroit, his offensive line helped Barry Sanders to rush for more than 2,000 yards.

Following his time in Detroit, he signed on with Jim Haslett to coach the offensive line for the New Orleans Saints. During his time in New Orleans, the Saints won a playoff game for the first time in the franchise's history and had a 1,000-yard rusher for five consecutive years, which was also a franchise first. He was then named assistant head coach and run game coordinator in his later years with the club.

After a disappointing playoff loss to the Pittsburgh Steelers, the San Diego Chargers organization announced that Henry's contract would not be renewed when it expired in February 2009. During the 2006 season Henry's line cleared the way for LaDainian Tomlinson to lead the NFL in rushing as well as setting a new NFL record for touchdowns with 31.

Henry has retired and settled in Greensburg, Pennsylvania.
