= Lamont Hall =

American football player (born 1974)

No. 49, 81, 89
- Position: Tight end

Personal information
- Born: November 16, 1974 (age 51); Clover, South Carolina, U.S.
- Listed height: 6 ft 4 in (1.93 m)
- Listed weight: 260 lb (118 kg)

Career information
- High school: Clover (SC)
- College: Clemson
- NFL draft: 1998: undrafted

Career history
- Tampa Bay Buccaneers (1998)*; Rhein Fire (1999); Green Bay Packers (1999)*; San Francisco 49ers (1999)*; Green Bay Packers (1999); New Orleans Saints (2000–2002); Atlanta Falcons (2003)*; New Orleans Saints (2004–2005)
- * Offseason or practice squad member only

Awards and highlights
- Second-team All-ACC (1996)

Career NFL statistics
- Receptions: 19
- Receiving yards: 127
- Receiving touchdowns: 2
- Stats at Pro Football Reference

James Lamont Hall (born November 16, 1974) is an American teacher and former professional football player who played tight end for six seasons for the Green Bay Packers and New Orleans Saints.

== Professional career ==
While playing tight end for the Green Bay Packers and the New Orleans Saints, Hall scored a total of 2 touchdowns, with 127 receiving yards, and 19 receptions in his professional career. In 2006, he decided that he had finished his dream as an NFL player, and retired from the NFL to pursue other career interests and focus on his family.

== Personal life ==
After finishing up in the NFL, Hall used his Clemson University teaching diploma, teaching Social Studies for many different grade levels. Hall currently teaches at Flint Hill Middle School in Fort Mill, South Carolina. He coaches at the school and has won many basketball championships.
