= 2004 Carolina Panthers season =

NFL team season

- Owner: Jerry Richardson
- General manager: Marty Hurney
- Head coach: John Fox
- Home stadium: Bank of America Stadium

Results
- Record: 7–9
- Division place: 3rd NFC South
- Playoffs: Did not qualify
- Pro Bowlers: WR Muhsin Muhammad; DE Julius Peppers; LB Mark Fields; LB Dan Morgan

The 2004 Carolina Panthers season was the franchise's 10th season in the National Football League and the 3rd under head coach John Fox. It was also the team's 8th season at Bank of America Stadium. They failed to improve upon their record in 2003, a year when they finished the regular season 11–5 and ultimately fell 29–32 in Super Bowl XXXVIII to the New England Patriots and they finished 7–9. Their collapse to a 1–7 record start was because of key injuries to their starters including wide receiver Steve Smith Sr. through the first eight games. Despite their late-season rally, they failed to make the playoffs. They would suffer another collapse in 2016 to a 6–10 record that year after appearing in Super Bowl 50 the previous season.

== Offseason ==
=== NFL draft ===
2004 Carolina Panthers draft
Round	Pick	Player	Position	College	Notes
1	28	Chris Gamble	Cornerback	Ohio State	
2	62	Keary Colbert	Wide receiver	USC	
3	94	Travelle Wharton	Offensive tackle	South Carolina	
5	163	Drew Carter	Wide receiver	Ohio State	
6	196	Sean Tufts	Linebacker	Colorado	
7	232	Michael Gaines	Tight end	Central Florida	
Made roster

== Personnel ==
2004 Carolina Panthers staff
Front office: Owner/founder – Jerry Richardson; President – Mark Richardson; General manager – Marty Hurney; Head coaches: Head coach – John Fox; Offensive coaches: Offensive coordinator – Dan Henning; Running backs – Jim Skipper; Wide receivers – Richard Williamson; Tight ends – Dave Magazu; Offensive line – Mike Maser; Offensive assistant/quarterbacks – Mike McCoy	Defensive coaches: Defensive coordinator – Mike Trgovac; Defensive line – Sal Sunseri; Linebackers – Ken Flajole; Linebackers – Sam Mills; Secondary – Rod Perry; Defensive assistant/safeties – Mike Gillhamer; Special teams coaches: Assistant head coach/special teams – Scott O'Brien; Special teams assistant – Danny Crossman; Strength and conditioning: Strength and conditioning – Jerry Simmons

== Roster ==
2004 Carolina Panthers roster
Quarterbacks (QB): 17 Jake Delhomme; 9 Rodney Peete; 12 Rod Rutherford; 16 Chris Weinke; Running backs (RB): 36 Brandon Bennett; 49 Casey Cramer FB; 37 Nick Goings; 45 Brad Hoover FB; 22 Jamal Robertson; Wide receivers (WR): 83 Keary Colbert; 88 Karl Hankton; 87 Muhsin Muhammad; 81 Ricky Proehl; 11 Micah Ross; Tight ends (TE): 84 Michael Gaines; 86 Kris Mangum; 82 Mike Seidman	Offensive linemen (OL): 63 Bill Ferrario G; 78 Todd Fordham LT; 69 Jordan Gross LT; 61 Dave Kadela RT; 60 Jeff Mitchell C; 76 Tutan Reyes G; 65 Rich Tylski G; 70 Travelle Wharton G; 71 Matt Willig RT; Defensive linemen (DL): 99 Brentson Buckner DT; 67 Jordan Carstens DT; 91 Omari Jordan DT; 94 Kindal Moorehead DT; 90 Julius Peppers DE; 62 Cleveland Pinkney DT; 97 Kemp Rasmussen DE; 93 Mike Rucker DE; 96 Al Wallace DE	Linebackers (LB): 52 Brian Allen OLB; 50 Vinny Ciurciu MLB; 58 Mark Fields OLB; 55 Dan Morgan MLB; 53 Brandon Short OLB; 57 Sean Tufts OLB; 54 Will Witherspoon OLB; Defensive backs (DB): 28 Colin Branch FS; 23 Curtis Fuller FS; 20 Chris Gamble CB; 27 Artrell Hawkins CB; 34 Eddie Jackson CB; 24 Ricky Manning CB; 30 Mike Minter SS; 21 Dante Wesley CB; Special teams (ST): 4 John Kasay K; 56 Jason Kyle LS; 10 Todd Sauerbrun P	Practice squad: -- Antoine Burns WR; -- Scott Farley S; -- Isaac Hilton DE; 68 Mike Houghton G; -- Adam Johnson TE; -- Derrick Knight RB; -- Nick Maddox RB; -- Rodney Reed DE; Reserve: 98 Jessie Armstead OLB (IR); 79 Doug Brzezinski G (IR); 18 Drew Carter WR (IR); 48 Stephen Davis RB (IR); 26 DeShaun Foster RB (IR); 31 William Hampton CB (IR); 25 Joey Harris RB (IR); 77 Kris Jenkins DT (IR); 72 Bruce Nelson C (IR); 92 Kavika Pittman DE (IR); 39 Damien Richardson FS (IR); 32 Rod Smart RB (IR); 89 Steve Smith WR (IR); 42 Travares Tillman SS (IR); Rookies in italics 53 active, 14 reserve, 8 practice squad

== Schedule ==
=== Regular season ===
Week	Date	Opponent	Result	Record	Venue	Recap
1	September 13	Green Bay Packers	L 14–24	0–1	Bank of America Stadium	Recap
2	September 19	at Kansas City Chiefs	W 28–17	1–1	Arrowhead Stadium	Recap
3	Bye					
4	October 3	Atlanta Falcons	L 10–27	1–2	Bank of America Stadium	Recap
5	October 10	at Denver Broncos	L 17–20	1–3	Invesco Field at Mile High	Recap
6	October 17	at Philadelphia Eagles	L 8–30	1–4	Lincoln Financial Field	Recap
7	October 24	San Diego Chargers	L 6–17	1–5	Bank of America Stadium	Recap
8	October 31	at Seattle Seahawks	L 17–23	1–6	Qwest Field	Recap
9	November 7	Oakland Raiders	L 24–27	1–7	Bank of America Stadium	Recap
10	November 14	at San Francisco 49ers	W 37–27	2–7	Monster Park	Recap
11	November 21	Arizona Cardinals	W 35–10	3–7	Bank of America Stadium	Recap
12	November 28	Tampa Bay Buccaneers	W 21–14	4–7	Bank of America Stadium	Recap
13	December 5	at New Orleans Saints	W 32–21	5–7	Louisiana Superdome	Recap
14	December 12	St. Louis Rams	W 20–7	6–7	Bank of America Stadium	Recap
15	December 18	at Atlanta Falcons	L 31–34 (OT)	6–8	Georgia Dome	Recap
16	December 26	at Tampa Bay Buccaneers	W 37–20	7–8	Raymond James Stadium	Recap
17	January 2	New Orleans Saints	L 18–21	7–9	Bank of America Stadium	Recap

== Standings ==
NFC South
	W	L	T	PCT	DIV	CONF	PF	PA	STK
^{(2)} Atlanta Falcons	11	5	0	.688	4–2	8–4	340	337	L2
New Orleans Saints	8	8	0	.500	3–3	6–6	348	405	W4
Carolina Panthers	7	9	0	.438	3–3	6–6	355	339	L1
Tampa Bay Buccaneers	5	11	0	.313	2–4	4–8	301	304	L4

NFC
#	Team	Division	W	L	T	PCT	DIV	CONF	SOS	SOV	STK
Division leaders
1	Philadelphia Eagles	East	13	3	0	.813	6–0	11–1	.453	.409	L2
2	Atlanta Falcons	South	11	5	0	.688	4–2	8–4	.420	.432	L2
3	Green Bay Packers	North	10	6	0	.625	5–1	9–3	.457	.419	W2
4	Seattle Seahawks	West	9	7	0	.563	3–3	8–4	.445	.368	W2
Wild cards
5 (Note: St. Louis clinched the NFC #5 seed instead of Minnesota or New Orleans based on better conference record (7–5 to Minnesota’s 5–7 to New Orleans’ 6–6).)	St. Louis Rams	West	8	8	0	.500	5–1	7–5	.488	.438	W2
6 (Note: Minnesota clinched the NFC #6 seed instead of New Orleans based on head-to-head victory.)	Minnesota Vikings	North	8	8	0	.500	3–3	5–7	.480	.406	L2
Did not qualify for the postseason
7	New Orleans Saints	South	8	8	0	.500	3–3	6–6	.465	.427	W4
8	Carolina Panthers	South	7	9	0	.438	3–3	6–6	.496	.366	L1
9 (Note: Detroit finished ahead of Arizona and New York Giants based upon head-to-head record (2–0 versus Arizona’s 1–1 and New York Giants’ 0–2). Division tiebreak was initially used to eliminate Dallas and Washington.)	Detroit Lions	North	6	10	0	.375	2–4	5–7	.496	.417	L2
10	Arizona Cardinals	West	6	10	0	.375	2–4	5–7	.461	.417	W1
11 (Note: New York Giants finished ahead of Dallas and Washington in the NFC East based on better head-to-head record (3–1 to Dallas‘ 2–2 to Washington’s 1–3).)	New York Giants	East	6	10	0	.375	3–3	5–7	.516	.417	W1
12 (Note: Dallas finished ahead of Washington in the NFC East based on head-to-head sweep.)	Dallas Cowboys	East	6	10	0	.375	2–4	5–7	.516	.375	L1
13	Washington Redskins	East	6	10	0	.375	1–5	6–6	.477	.333	W1
14 (Note: Tampa Bay finished ahead of Chicago based upon head-to-head victory.)	Tampa Bay Buccaneers	South	5	11	0	.313	2–4	4–8	.477	.413	L4
15	Chicago Bears	North	5	11	0	.313	2–4	4–8	.465	.388	L4
16	San Francisco 49ers	West	2	14	0	.125	2–4	2–10	.488	.375	L3
Tiebreakers (Note: When breaking ties for three or more teams under the NFL's rules, they are first broken within divisions, then comparing only the highest-ranked remaining team from each division.)
