= 2004 Minnesota Vikings season =

NFL team season

- Owner: Red McCombs
- General manager: Rob Brzezinski
- Head coach: Mike Tice
- Home stadium: Hubert H. Humphrey Metrodome

Results
- Record: 8–8
- Division place: 2nd NFC North
- Playoffs: Won Wild Card Playoffs (at Packers) 31–17; Lost Divisional Playoffs (at Eagles) 14–27
- All-Pros: DT Kevin Williams
- Pro Bowlers: QB Daunte Culpepper; C Matt Birk

Uniform
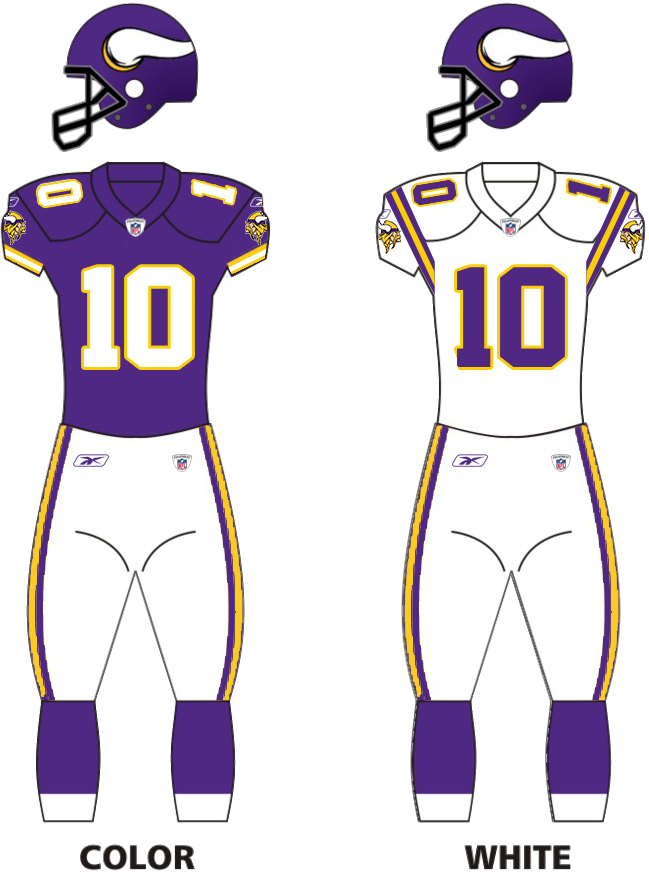

The 2004 season was the Minnesota Vikings' 44th in the National Football League. The Vikings finished the 2004 season going 3–7 over the final 10 weeks, just like they did in 2003; however, they made the playoffs with an overall 8–8 record. Quarterback Daunte Culpepper amassed MVP-level statistics, throwing for 4,717 passing yards (leading the NFL), 39 passing touchdowns (a franchise record) and 5,123 total yards (an NFL record).

In the wildcard round of the playoffs, the Vikings defeated their rival Green Bay Packers 31–17 in their first ever playoff meeting, making them the second team in NFL history to have a .500 record (8–8) in the regular season and win a playoff game (following the St. Louis Rams, who had beaten the Seattle Seahawks the previous day). In the divisional round, the Vikings were defeated 27–14 by the eventual NFC champion Philadelphia Eagles and did not return to the playoffs for four years.

Following the season, Randy Moss was traded to the Oakland Raiders; he returned briefly to the Vikings in 2010.

== Offseason ==
=== 2004 draft ===
2004 Minnesota Vikings Draft
Draft order		Player name	Position	College	Notes
Round	Overall	Player name	Position	College	Notes
1	19	Traded to the Miami Dolphins (Note: The Vikings traded their first-round selection (19th overall) to the Dolphins in exchange for a first- and fourth-round selections (20th and 119th overall).)			
1	20	Kenechi Udeze	Defensive end	USC	From Dolphins
2	48	Dontarrious Thomas	Linebacker	Auburn	From Saints (Note: The Vikings traded their second- and fifth-round selections (50th and 151st overall) to the Saints in exchange for a second-round selection (48th overall).)
2	50	Traded to the New Orleans Saints			
3	82	Traded to the Baltimore Ravens (Note: The Vikings traded their third-round selection (82nd overall) to the Ravens in exchange for a third- and fifth-round selections (88th and 155th overall).)			
3	88	Darrion Scott	Defensive end	Ohio State	From Ravens
4	115	Nat Dorsey	Offensive tackle	Georgia Tech	
4	119	Mewelde Moore	Running back	Tulane	From Dolphins
5	151	Traded to the New Orleans Saints			
5	155	Rod Davis	Linebacker	Southern Miss	From Ravens
6	184	Deandre Eiland	Strong safety	South Carolina	
7	220	Jeff Dugan	Tight end	Maryland	

== Staff ==
2004 Minnesota Vikings staff
Front office: Owner – Red McCombs; President – Gary Woods; Vice president of football operations – Rob Brzezinski; Head coaches: Head coach – Mike Tice; Offensive coaches: Offensive coordinator/quarterbacks – Scott Linehan; Running backs – Dean Dalton; Wide receivers – Charlie Baggett; Tight ends/assistant offensive line – John Tice; Offensive line – Steve Loney; Offensive quality control – Randy Hanson	Defensive coaches: Defensive coordinator/linebackers – Ted Cottrell; Defensive line – Brian Baker; Secondary – Chuck Knox Jr.; Assistant secondary – Kevin Ross; Defensive assistant/assistant linebackers – Pete Bercich; Defensive quality control – Jim Panagos; Special teams coaches: Special teams – Rusty Tillman; Strength and conditioning: Strength and conditioning – Kurtis Shultz; Assistant strength and conditioning – Mark Ellis

== Final roster ==
2004 Minnesota Vikings roster
Quarterbacks (QB): 11 Daunte Culpepper; 12 Gus Frerotte; 13 Shaun Hill; Running backs (RB): 23 Michael Bennett; 30 Mewelde Moore; 29 Larry Ned; 32 Onterrio Smith; 20 Moe Williams; Wide receivers (WR): 81 Nate Burleson; 16 Kelly Campbell; 84 Randy Moss; 87 Marcus Robinson; Tight ends (TE): 44 Sean Berton; 83 Jeff Dugan; 49 Richard Owens; 85 Jermaine Wiggins	Offensive linemen (OL): 78 Matt Birk C; 63 Bill Conaty C; 71 David Dixon G; 65 Nat Dorsey RT; 73 Adam Goldberg RT; 72 Adam Haayer LT; 64 Anthony Herrera G; 76 Chris Liwienski G; 74 Bryant McKinnie LT; 60 Cory Withrow C; Defensive linemen (DL): 99 Chris Hovan DT; 97 Spencer Johnson DT; 51 Lance Johnstone DE; 90 Steve Martin DT; 79 Kenny Mixon DE; 98 Darrion Scott DE; 95 Kenechi Udeze DE; 93 Kevin Williams DT	Linebackers (LB): 55 Chris Claiborne OLB; 50 Rod Davis OLB; 56 E. J. Henderson MLB; 59 Mike Nattiel OLB; 52 Keith Newman OLB; 54 Dontarrious Thomas MLB; Defensive backs (DB): 33 Ralph Brown CB; 21 Corey Chavous SS; 31 Rushen Jones CB; 38 Rhett Nelson CB; 24 Willie Offord SS; 27 Brian Russell FS; 25 Terrance Shaw CB; 29 Brian Williams CB; 26 Antoine Winfield CB; Special teams (ST): 7 Morten Andersen K; 2 Darren Bennett P; 1 José Cortez K; 46 Cullen Loeffler LS	Practice squad: -- Skyler Fulton WR; 18 Ryan Hoag WR; -- Aaron Hosack WR; -- Will Hunter S; 17 Ben Nelson WR; -- Brandon Newton C; -- Shannon Snell G; 34 Butchie Wallace RB; Reserve: 86 Richard Angulo TE (IR); 89 Kenny Clark WR (IR); 8 Aaron Elling K (IR); 15 Blake Elliott WR (IR); 82 Keenan Howry WR (IR); 22 Ken Irvin CB (IR); 40 Jim Kleinsasser TE (IR); 75 Mike Rosenthal RT (IR); 57 Raonall Smith OLB (IR); 91 Grant Wiley MLB (IR); Rookies in italics 53 active, 10 reserve, 8 practice squad

== Preseason ==
=== Schedule ===
Week	Date	Opponent	Result	Record	Venue	Attendance	NFL.com recap
1	August 14	Arizona Cardinals	W 23–6	1–0	Hubert H. Humphrey Metrodome	63,658	Recap
2	August 20	at Atlanta Falcons	L 24–27	1–1	Georgia Dome	70,623	Recap
3	August 27	San Francisco 49ers	W 23–10	2–1	Hubert H. Humphrey Metrodome	63,960	Recap
4	September 2	at Seattle Seahawks	L 21–23	2–2	Qwest Field	50,198	Recap

=== Game summaries ===
==== Week 1: vs. Arizona Cardinals ====
Week 1: Arizona Cardinals at Minnesota Vikings – Game summary

Quarter	1	2	3	4	Total
Cardinals	3	0	3	0	6
Vikings	0	13	7	3	23

at Hubert H. Humphrey Metrodome, Minneapolis, Minnesota

- Date: August 14
- Game time: 7:00 p.m. CDT
- Game weather: None (indoor stadium)
- Game attendance: 63,658
- Referee: Bill Carollo (63)
- Recap, Game Book

Game information

First quarter

- ARI – Neil Rackers 46-yard field goal, 3:58. Cardinals 3–0. Drive: 8 plays, 31 yards, 4:16.

Second quarter

- MIN – Randy Moss 48-yard pass from Daunte Culpepper (Aaron Elling kick), 13:24. Vikings 7–3. Drive: 3 plays, 79 yards, 1:24.
- MIN – Aaron Elling 30-yard field goal, 8:45. Vikings 10–3. Drive: 9 plays, 71 yards, 2:55.
- MIN – Aaron Elling 36-yard field goal, 1:57. Vikings 13–3. Drive: 9 plays, 54 yards, 4:40.

Third quarter

- ARI – Neil Rackers 33-yard field goal, 2:27. Vikings 13–6. Drive: 10 plays, 30 yards, 4:49.
- MIN – Mewelde Moore 39-yard run (Dan Orner kick), 0:51. Vikings 20–6. Drive: 3 plays, 66 yards, 1:36.

Fourth quarter

- MIN – Dan Orner 46-yard field goal, 6:36. Vikings 23–6. Drive: 9 plays, 57 yards, 4:49.

Top passers

- ARI – John Navarre – 6/7, 76 yards
- MIN – Gus Frerotte – 9/18, 136 yards, INT

Top rushers

- ARI – Larry Croom – 8 rushes, 37 yards
- MIN – Mewelde Moore – 3 rushes, 52 yards, TD

Top receivers

- ARI – Fabian Davis – 1 reception, 32 yards
- MIN – Randy Moss – 3 receptions, 61 yards, TD

==== Week 2: at Atlanta Falcons ====
Week 2: Minnesota Vikings at Atlanta Falcons – Game summary

Quarter	1	2	3	4	Total
Vikings	14	3	7	0	24
Falcons	0	13	7	7	27

at Georgia Dome, Atlanta, Georgia

- Date: August 20
- Game time: 7:30 p.m. EST/6:30 p.m. CST
- Game weather: None (indoor stadium)
- Game attendance: 70,623
- Referee: Gerry Austin (34)
- Recap, Game Book

Game information

First quarter

- MIN – Moe Williams 1-yard run (Aaron Elling kick), 13:07. Vikings 7–0. Drive: 4 plays, 30 yards, 1:53.
- MIN – Randy Moss 67-yard pass from Daunte Culpepper (Aaron Elling kick), 7:19. Vikings 14–0. Drive: 6 plays, 94 yards, 3:08.

Second quarter

- MIN – Aaron Elling 47-yard field goal, 12:49. Vikings 17–0. Drive: 4 plays, −2 yards, 1:02.
- ATL – Jay Feely 28-yard field goal, 8:16. Vikings 17–3. Drive: 9 plays, 62 yards, 4:33.
- ATL – Michael Jenkins 47-yard pass from Matt Schaub (Jay Feely kick), 7:21. Vikings 17–10. Drive: 2 plays, 58 yards, 0:55.
- ATL – Jay Feely 34-yard field goal, 0:32. Vikings 17–13. Drive: 11 plays, 53 yards, 5:08.

Third quarter

- MIN – Kelly Campbell 83-yard pass from Gus Frerotte (Aaron Elling kick), 12:38. Vikings 24–13. Drive: 5 plays, 91 yards, 2:22.
- ATL – Stanley Pritchett 1-yard pass from Matt Schaub (Damon Duval kick), 5:57. Vikings 24–20. Drive: 11 plays, 84 yards, 6:41.

Fourth quarter

- ATL – Jimmy Farris 1-yard pass from Matt Schaub (Damon Duval kick), 6:47. Falcons 27–24. Drive: 9 plays, 52 yards, 4:32.

Top passers

- MIN – Gus Frerotte – 6/8, 126 yards, TD
- ATL – Matt Schaub – 16/19, 205 yards, 3 TD

Top rushers

- MIN – Mewelde Moore – 7 rushes, 38 yards
- ATL – Warrick Dunn – 8 rushes, 72 yards

Top receivers

- MIN – Kelly Campbell – 3 receptions, 100 yards, TD
- ATL – Michael Jenkins – 2 receptions, 63 yards, TD

==== Week 3: vs. San Francisco 49ers ====
Week 3: San Francisco 49ers at Minnesota Vikings – Game summary

Quarter	1	2	3	4	Total
49ers	0	0	7	3	10
Vikings	13	3	0	7	23

at Hubert H. Humphrey Metrodome, Minneapolis, Minnesota

- Date: August 27
- Game time: 7:05 p.m. CDT
- Game weather: None (indoor stadium)
- Game attendance: 63,960
- Referee: Pete Morelli (135)
- Recap, Game Book

Game information

First quarter

- MIN – Nate Burleson 17-yard pass from Daunte Culpepper (Aaron Elling kick), 13:00. Vikings 7–0. Drive: 5 plays, 47 yards, 2:00.
- MIN – Kelly Campbell 26-yard pass from Daunte Culpepper (kick failed, wide left), 8:38. Vikings 13–0. Drive: 6 plays, 62 yards, 3:11.

Second quarter

- MIN – Aaron Elling 35-yard field goal, 10:24. Vikings 16–0. Drive: 10 plays, 48 yards, 4:29.

Third quarter

- SF – Jamal Robertson 6-yard run (Todd Peterson kick), 10:00. Vikings 16–7. Drive: 2 plays, 46 yards, 0:34.

Fourth quarter

- SF – Kirk Yliniemi 44-yard field goal, 11:39. Vikings 16–10. Drive: 12 plays, 52 yards, 6:26.
- MIN – Larry Ned 24-yard run (Dan Orner kick), 3:38. Vikings 23–10. Drive: 9 plays, 60 yards, 4:00.

Top passers

- SF – Tim Rattay – 7/10, 51 yards
- MIN – Daunte Culpepper – 20/27, 204 yards, 2 TD

Top rushers

- SF – Jamal Robertson – 5 rushes, 53 yards, TD
- MIN – Michael Bennett – 3 rushes, 52 yards, TD

Top receivers

- SF – Maurice Hicks – 2 receptions, 30 yards
- MIN – Nate Burleson – 5 receptions, 89 yards, TD

==== Week 4: at Seattle Seahawks ====
Week 4: Minnesota Vikings at Seattle Seahawks – Game summary

Quarter	1	2	3	4	Total
Vikings	7	0	14	0	21
Seahawks	0	14	3	6	23

at Qwest Field, Seattle, Washington

- Date: September 2
- Game time: 6:00 p.m. PDT/8:00 p.m. CDT
- Game weather: Partly sunny, 66 °F (19 °C)
- Game attendance: 50,198
- Referee: Mike Carey (94)
- Recap, Game Book

Game information

First quarter

- MIN – Jermaine Wiggins 22-yard pass from Daunte Culpepper (Brett Conway kick), 5:49. Vikings 7–0. Drive: 9 plays, 88 yards, 5:41.

Second quarter

- SEA – Jason Willis 5-yard pass from Trent Dilfer (Josh Brown kick), 2:42. Tied 7–7. Drive: 12 plays, 77 yards, 6:16.
- SEA – Antoine Burns 7-yard pass from Trent Dilfer (Josh Brown kick), 1:15. Seahawks 14–7. Drive: 3 plays, 84 yards, 0:25.

Third quarter

- SEA – Josh Brown 39-yard field goal, 10:36. Seahawks 17–7. Drive: 8 plays, 33 yards, 3:10.
- MIN – Larry Ned 1-yard run (Brett Conway kick), 4:24. Seahawks 17–14. Drive: 14 plays, 67 yards, 6:12.
- MIN – Larry Ned 10-yard pass from Shaun Hill (Brett Conway kick), 0:26. Vikings 21–17. Drive: 6 plays, 52 yards, 2:59.

Fourth quarter

- SEA – Josh Brown 41-yard field goal, 5:21. Vikings 21–20. Drive: 12 plays, 46 yards, 4:24.
- SEA – Josh Brown 28-yard field goal, 0:00. Seahawks 23–21. Drive: 9 plays, 68 yards, 2:57.

Top passers

- MIN – Shaun Hill – 14/18, 137 yards, TD
- SEA – Trent Dilfer – 17/20, 211 yards, 2 TD, INT

Top rushers

- MIN – Larry Ned – 15 rushes, 55 yards, TD
- SEA – Maurice Morris – 10 rushes, 52 yards

Top receivers

- MIN – Mewelde Moore – 2 receptions, 56 yards
- SEA – Antoine Burns – 5 receptions, 96 yards, TD

== Regular season ==
=== Schedule ===
Week	Date	Opponent	Result	Record	Venue	Attendance	NFL.com recap
1	September 12	Dallas Cowboys	W 35–17	1–0	Hubert H. Humphrey Metrodome	64,105	Recap
2	September 20	at Philadelphia Eagles	L 16–27	1–1	Lincoln Financial Field	67,676	Recap
3	September 26	Chicago Bears	W 27–22	2–1	Hubert H. Humphrey Metrodome	64,163	Recap
4	Bye						
5	October 10	at Houston Texans	W 34–28 (OT)	3–1	Reliant Stadium	70,718	Recap
6	October 17	at New Orleans Saints	W 38–31	4–1	Louisiana Superdome	64,900	Recap
7	October 24	Tennessee Titans	W 20–3	5–1	Hubert H. Humphrey Metrodome	64,108	Recap
8	October 31	New York Giants	L 13–34	5–2	Hubert H. Humphrey Metrodome	64,012	Recap
9	November 8	at Indianapolis Colts	L 28–31	5–3	RCA Dome	57,307	Recap
10	November 14	at Green Bay Packers	L 31–34	5–4	Lambeau Field	70,671	Recap
11	November 21	Detroit Lions	W 22–19	6–4	Hubert H. Humphrey Metrodome	64,156	Recap
12	November 28	Jacksonville Jaguars	W 27–16	7–4	Hubert H. Humphrey Metrodome	64,004	Recap
13	December 5	at Chicago Bears	L 14–24	7–5	Soldier Field	62,051	Recap
14	December 12	Seattle Seahawks	L 23–27	7–6	Hubert H. Humphrey Metrodome	64,110	Recap
15	December 19	at Detroit Lions	W 28–27	8–6	Ford Field	62,337	Recap
16	December 24	Green Bay Packers	L 31–34	8–7	Hubert H. Humphrey Metrodome	64,311	Recap
17	January 2	at Washington Redskins	L 18–21	8–8	FedExField	76,876	Recap

=== Game summaries ===
==== Week 1: vs. Dallas Cowboys ====
Week 1: Dallas Cowboys at Minnesota Vikings – Game summary

Quarter	1	2	3	4	Total
Cowboys	3	7	7	0	17
Vikings	0	14	14	7	35

at Hubert H. Humphrey Metrodome, Minneapolis, Minnesota

- Date: September 12
- Game time: 3:15 p.m. CDT
- Game weather: None (indoor stadium)
- Game attendance: 64,105
- Referee: Pete Morelli (135)
- Recap, Game Book

Game information

First quarter

- DAL – Billy Cundiff 27-yard field goal, 11:02. Cowboys 3–0. Drive: 9 plays, 67 yards, 3:58.

Second quarter

- MIN – Onterrio Smith 63-yard pass from Daunte Culpepper (Morten Andersen kick), 11:26. Vikings 7–3. Drive: 3 plays, 72 yards, 1:32.
- MIN – Marcus Robinson 3-yard pass from Daunte Culpepper (Morten Andersen kick), 0:30. Vikings 14–3. Drive: 15 plays, 85 yards, 9:03.
- DAL – Terry Glenn 32-yard pass from Vinny Testaverde (Billy Cundiff kick), 0:05. Vikings 14–10. Drive: 4 plays, 65 yards, 0:25.

Third quarter

- MIN – Randy Moss 3-yard pass from Daunte Culpepper (Morten Andersen kick), 12:25. Vikings 21–10. Drive: 6 plays, 81 yards, 2:35.
- DAL – ReShard Lee 7-yard run (Billy Cundiff kick), 10:36. Vikings 21–17. Drive: 4 plays, 31 yards, 1:49.
- MIN – Randy Moss 1-yard pass from Daunte Culpepper (Morten Andersen kick), 6:01. Vikings 28–17. Drive: 8 plays, 61 yards, 4:35.

Fourth quarter

- MIN – Kelly Campbell 43-yard pass from Daunte Culpepper (Morten Andersen kick), 6:56. Vikings 35–17. Drive: 4 plays, 81 yards, 2:39.

Top passers

- DAL – Vinny Testaverde – 29/50, 355 yards, TD
- MIN – Daunte Culpepper – 17/23, 242 yards, 5 TD

Top rushers

- DAL – ReShard Lee – 5 rushes, 35 yards, TD
- MIN – Onterrio Smith – 15 rushes, 76 yards

Top receivers

- DAL – Antonio Bryant – 8 receptions, 112 yards
- MIN – Onterrio Smith – 1 reception, 63 yards, TD

The Vikings kicked off the season hosting the Bill Parcells coached Dallas Cowboys. After an opening quarter that only saw the Cowboys recording a field goal, Daunte Culpepper caught fire, throwing two-second quarter touchdowns to Onterrio Smith and Marcus Robinson. Vinny Testaverde responded down 14–3, finding Terry Glenn for a 32-yard touchdown as the half expired. Randy Moss found his groove in the third quarter, finding himself on the receiving end of two Daunte Culpepper touchdowns. In the fourth quarter, the Cowboys drove into the red zone down 28–17, but Antoine Winfield forced and recovered a Richie Anderson fumble, which led to Daunte Culpepper's fifth touchdown pass, via a 43-yard pass to Kelly Campbell. Onterrio Smith helped ice the game away, finishing with 76 yards rushing, giving him 139 yards from scrimmage. The Vikings defense did show some holes in the win, allowing 41-year-old Vinny Testaverde to pass for 355 yards, while also allowing 71 yards rushing on the day.

==== Week 2: at Philadelphia Eagles ====
Week 2: Minnesota Vikings at Philadelphia Eagles – Game summary

Quarter	1	2	3	4	Total
Vikings	3	3	3	7	16
Eagles	7	3	7	10	27

at Lincoln Financial Field, Philadelphia, Pennsylvania

- Date: September 20
- Game time: 9:00 p.m. EDT/8:00 p.m. CDT
- Game weather: Clear, 61 °F (16 °C)
- Game attendance: 67,676
- Referee: Bill Carollo (63)
- Recap, Game Book

Game information

First quarter

- MIN – Morten Andersen 42-yard field goal, 11:20. Vikings 3–0. Drive: 8 plays, 50 yards, 3:40.
- PHI – L. J. Smith 11-yard pass from Donovan McNabb (David Akers kick), 5:43. Eagles 7–3. Drive: 11 plays, 72 yards, 5:37.

Second quarter

- MIN – Morten Andersen 19-yard field goal, 12:06. Eagles 7–6. Drive: 14 plays, 65 yards, 8:37.
- PHI – David Akers 37-yard field goal, 6:36. Eagles 10–6. Drive: 11 plays, 53 yards, 5:30.

Third quarter

- PHI – Donovan McNabb 20-yard run (David Akers kick), 11:22. Eagles 17–6. Drive: 5 plays, 43 yards, 3:38.
- MIN – Morten Andersen 39-yard field goal, 4:37. Eagles 17–9. Drive: 12 plays, 59 yards, 6:45.

Fourth quarter

- PHI – Terrell Owens 45-yard pass from Donovan McNabb (David Akers kick), 7:40. Eagles 24–9. Drive: 4 plays, 66 yards, 1:34.
- MIN – Randy Moss 4-yard pass from Daunte Culpepper (Morten Andersen kick), 3:32. Eagles 24–16. Drive: 11 plays, 75 yards, 4:08.
- PHI – David Akers 47-yard field goal, 1:11. Eagles 27–16. Drive: 5 plays, 13 yards, 2:21.

Top passers

- MIN – Daunte Culpepper – 37/47, 343 yards, TD, INT
- PHI – Donovan McNabb – 19/28, 245 yards, 2 TD

Top rushers

- MIN – Daunte Culpepper – 8 rushes, 41 yards
- PHI – Brian Westbrook – 12 rushes, 69 yards

Top receivers

- MIN – Randy Moss – 8 receptions, 69 yards, TD
- PHI – Terrell Owens – 4 receptions, 79 yards, TD

The Vikings traveled to Philadelphia for a Monday night showdown with the NFC favorite Eagles. The Vikings started the game with a Morten Andersen field goal. The Eagles then responded with a strong drive by Brian Westbrook, resulting in an 11-yard touchdown pass from Donovan McNabb to L. J. Smith. The remaining second half resulted in a series of frustrations for the Vikings, twice having a 1st-and-goal within the 2-yard line, only to result in a field goal and a Culpepper fumble. In the second half, the Eagles scored on their opening possession, capped off with a 20-yard touchdown run by Donovan McNabb. Morten Andersen then missed a field goal with the Vikings down 17–9, which the Eagles responded to with a 45-yard touchdown reception by Terrell Owens three plays later. The Vikings finally found the end zone with three minutes remaining on a 4-yard Randy Moss reception to bring the Vikings within 8, only to be countered by a David Akers field goal with 1:15 remaining, putting the game away. The Vikings defense put together a second-straight poor effort, allowing 353 yards of offense. Daunte Culpepper continued his strong start in the loss, throwing for 348 yards, while also being the Vikings leading rusher, finishing with 41 yards.

==== Week 3: vs. Chicago Bears ====
Week 3: Chicago Bears at Minnesota Vikings – Game summary

Quarter	1	2	3	4	Total
Bears	3	3	0	16	22
Vikings	0	10	7	10	27

at Hubert H. Humphrey Metrodome, Minneapolis, Minnesota

- Date: September 26
- Game time: 12:00 p.m. CDT
- Game weather: None (indoor stadium)
- Game attendance: 64,163
- Referee: Mike Carey (94)
- Recap, Game Book

Game information

First quarter

- CHI – Paul Edinger 34-yard field goal, 8:08. Bears 3–0. Drive: 12 plays, 47 yards, 6:52.

Second quarter

- CHI – Paul Edinger 23-yard field goal, 13:41. Bears 6–0. Drive: 4 plays, 2 yards, 1:19.
- MIN – Randy Moss 3-yard pass from Daunte Culpepper (Morten Andersen kick), 8:57. Vikings 7–6. Drive: 8 plays, 83 yards, 4:44.
- MIN – Morten Andersen 42-yard field goal, 5:09. Vikings 10–6. Drive: 6 plays, 20 yards, 2:23.

Third quarter

- MIN – Daunte Culpepper 1-yard run (Morten Andersen kick), 10:58. Vikings 17–6. Drive: 7 plays, 67 yards, 4:02.

Fourth quarter

- CHI – Paul Edinger 32-yard field goal, 14:46. Vikings 17–9. Drive: 7 plays, 34 yards, 3:14.
- MIN – Morten Andersen 24-yard field goal, 11:20. Vikings 20–9. Drive: 7 plays, 68 yards, 3:26.
- CHI – Thomas Jones 1-yard run (pass failed), 6:20. Vikings 20–15. Drive: 9 plays, 79 yards, 5:00.
- MIN – Randy Moss 2-yard pass from Daunte Culpepper (Morten Andersen kick), 5:39. Vikings 27–15. Drive: 4 plays, 67 yards, 0:41.
- CHI – Rex Grossman 6-yard run (Paul Edinger kick), 2:00. Vikings 27–22. Drive: 9 plays, 61 yards, 3:39.

Top passers

- CHI – Rex Grossman – 21/31, 248 yards
- MIN – Daunte Culpepper – 19/30, 360 yards, 2 TD

Top rushers

- CHI – Thomas Jones – 22 rushes, 110 yards, TD
- MIN – Onterrio Smith – 17 rushes, 94 yards

Top receivers

- CHI – Bobby Wade – 4 receptions, 71 yards
- MIN – Randy Moss – 7 receptions, 119 yards

The Vikings returned home in week 3 to face the 1–1 Bears. The Bears scored a field goal on the opening drive, with the game devolving to a slop fest over the next quarter. The Vikings missed a field goal, responded with Lance Johnstone forcing a Rex Grossman fumble, only for Onterrio Smith to fumble on the following play. After falling behind 6–0, the Vikings finally found offensive success, with Culpepper finding Kelly Campbell for 40 yards, followed several plays later with a 3-yard Randy Moss touchdown. The Vikings extended their lead following a long third quarter drive, culminating with a 1-yard Culpepper touchdown run, giving the Vikings a 17–6 lead. After trading field goals, the Bears cut the lead to 20–16 on a Thomas Jones touchdown run. The Vikings again responded, with Culpepper throwing a 63-yard pass to Nate Burleson, setting up a 2-yard touchdown connection to Randy Moss. Rex Grossman led the Bears in their comeback attempt, as he dove for the pylon, and appeared to fumble out of the back of the end zone. A Lovie Smith challenge showed Grossman crossed the plane prior to fumbling, but Grossman tore his ACL on the play, ending his 2004 season. The Bears got the ball with 1:16 left trailing 27–22, but backup quarterback Jonathan Quinn threw three consecutive incompletions, and then be sacked on fourth down by Kevin Williams, sealing the victory for the Vikings. Daunte Culpepper continued to have stellar numbers, throwing for 360 yards, with Randy Moss having 119 yards receiving, and Onterrio Smith having 104 yards receiving, and 94 yards rushing. The defense continued to act as a sieve, with Grossman throwing for 248 yards, and running back Thomas Jones rushing for 110 yards, and adding 71 yards receiving.

==== Week 5: at Houston Texans ====
Week 5: Minnesota Vikings at Houston Texans – Game summary

Quarter	1	2	3	4	OT	Total
Vikings	0	14	7	7	6	34
Texans	0	0	7	21	0	28

at Reliant Stadium, Houston, Texas

- Date: October 10
- Game time: 12:00 p.m. CDT
- Game weather: None (indoor stadium)
- Game attendance: 70,718
- Referee: Ed Hochuli (85)
- Recap, Game Book

Game information

First quarter

- No scoring plays.

Second quarter

- MIN – Randy Moss 1-yard pass from Daunte Culpepper (Morten Andersen kick), 14:11. Vikings 7–0. Drive: 12 plays, 80 yards, 6:40.
- MIN – Nate Burleson 5-yard pass from Daunte Culpepper (Morten Andersen kick), 0:36. Vikings 14–0. Drive: 11 plays, 80 yards, 2:23.

Third quarter

- MIN – Marcus Robinson 10-yard pass from Daunte Culpepper (Morten Andersen kick), 11:50. Vikings 21–0. Drive: 3 plays, 49 yards, 0:46.
- HOU – Andre Johnson 2-yard pass from David Carr (Kris Brown kick), 6:52. Vikings 21–7. Drive: 9 plays, 94 yards, 4:58.

Fourth quarter

- HOU – Domanick Davis 1-yard run (Kris Brown kick), 11:31. Vikings 21–14. Drive: 6 plays, 58 yards, 3:11.
- MIN – Randy Moss 50-yard pass from Daunte Culpepper (Morten Andersen kick), 6:49. Vikings 28–14. Drive: 3 plays, 59 yards, 0:59.
- HOU – Derick Armstrong 11-yard pass from David Carr (Kris Brown kick), 3:11. Vikings 28–21. Drive: 12 plays, 58 yards, 3:38.
- HOU – Andre Johnson 22-yard pass from David Carr (Kris Brown kick), 1:53. Tied 28–28. Drive: 3 plays, 42 yards, 0:28.

Overtime

- MIN – Marcus Robinson 50-yard pass from Daunte Culpepper, 7:05. Vikings 34–28. Drive: 6 plays, 81 yards, 2:30.

Top passers

- MIN – Daunte Culpepper – 36/50, 396 yards, 5 TD
- HOU – David Carr – 27/42, 372 yards, 3 TD

Top rushers

- MIN – Mewelde Moore – 20 rushes, 92 yards
- HOU – Domanick Davis – 14 rushes, 31 yards, TD

Top receivers

- MIN – Marcus Robinson – 9 receptions, 150 yards, 2 TD
- HOU – Andre Johnson – 12 receptions, 170 yards, 2 TD

The Vikings came out of their bye week to face the 2–2 Houston Texans for the first time in franchise history. The Vikings defense appeared fresh, shutting down David Carr and the Texans in the first half, while Daunte Culpepper and the Vikings offense continued humming, with Culpepper finding Nate Burleson and Randy Moss for second quarter touchdowns, giving the Vikings a 14–0 halftime advantage. The Vikings defense continued strongly in the second half, forcing a three-and-out, which the Vikings followed with three Culpepper completions, capped off with a 10-yard Burleson touchdown. David Carr found some success, leading the Texans on two long scoring drives, resulting in touchdowns by Andre Johnson and Dominack Williams. The Vikings seemingly put the game out of reach on a 50-yard touchdown pass from Culpepper to Randy Moss with 6:58 remaining. David Carr continued his career best game, leading two long drives, capping them off with touchdown passes to Derrick Armstrong and David Carr, sandwiching a Vikings three-and-out, forcing overtime. In overtime, the Vikings won the toss, and the teams traded punts. On the Vikings second possession of overtime, Culpepper found Marcus Robinson on a post on 3rd-and-12 from the 50, earning the walk-off win for the Vikings. Culpepper finished with 396 yards passing and five touchdowns, with Mewelde Moore adding 92 yards rushing and 90 yards receiving. The defense ended up allowing David Carr to pass for 372 yards and three touchdowns, with Andre Johnson burning the Vikings for 170 yards receiving on 12 catches. The win did bring the Vikings record to 3–1.

==== Week 6: at New Orleans Saints ====
Week 6: Minnesota Vikings at New Orleans Saints – Game summary

Quarter	1	2	3	4	Total
Vikings	7	14	10	7	38
Saints	0	14	7	10	31

at Louisiana Superdome, New Orleans, Louisiana

- Date: October 17
- Game time: 7:35 p.m. CDT
- Game weather: Mostly cloudy, 76 °F (24 °C)
- Game attendance: 64,900
- Referee: Tony Corrente (99)
- Recap, Game Book

Game information

First quarter

- MIN – Jermaine Wiggins 1-yard pass from Daunte Culpepper (Morten Andersen kick), 7:53. Vikings 7–0. Drive: 8 plays, 67 yards, 3:42.

Second quarter

- MIN – Randy Moss 43-yard pass from Daunte Culpepper (Morten Andersen kick), 14:03. Vikings 14–0. Drive: 3 plays, 38 yards, 1:03.
- NO – Deuce McAllister 2-yard run (John Carney kick), 6:29. Vikings 14–7. Drive: 3 plays, 14 yards, 1:19.
- MIN – Marcus Robinson 16-yard pass from Daunte Culpepper (Morten Andersen kick), 1:53. Vikings 21–7. Drive: 6 plays, 65 yards, 2:31.
- NO – Joe Horn 7-yard pass from Aaron Brooks (John Carney kick), 0:21. Vikings 21–14. Drive: 4 plays, 73 yards, 1:32.

Third quarter

- MIN – Jermaine Wiggins 9-yard pass from Daunte Culpepper (Morten Andersen kick), 10:48. Vikings 28–14. Drive: 7 plays, 66 yards, 2:39.
- NO – Deuce McAllister 1-yard run (John Carney kick), 6:13. Vikings 28–21. Drive: 9 plays, 79 yards, 4:35.
- MIN – Morten Andersen 39-yard field goal, 2:26. Vikings 31–21. Drive: 8 plays, 62 yards, 3:47.

Fourth quarter

- NO – John Carney 45-yard field goal, 13:08. Vikings 31–24. Drive: 10 plays, 54 yards, 4:18.
- MIN – Marcus Robinson 1-yard pass from Daunte Culpepper (Morten Andersen kick), 7:04. Vikings 38–24. Drive: 12 plays, 56 yards, 6:04.
- NO – Aaron Brooks 5-yard run (John Carney kick), 2:51. Vikigns 38–31. Drive: 11 plays, 65 yards, 4:13.

Top passers

- MIN – Daunte Culpepper – 26/37, 425 yards, 5 TD, 2 INT
- NO – Aaron Brooks – 22/38, 249 yards, TD, INT

Top rushers

- MIN – Mewelde Moore – 15 rushes, 109 yards
- NO – Deuce McAllister – 18 rushes, 78 yards, 2 TD

Top receivers

- MIN – Nate Burleson – 6 receptions, 134 yards
- NO – Jerome Pathon – 4 receptions, 92 yards

==== Week 7: vs. Tennessee Titans ====
Week 7: Tennessee Titans at Minnesota Vikings – Game summary

Quarter	1	2	3	4	Total
Titans	3	0	0	0	3
Vikings	3	14	0	3	20

at Hubert H. Humphrey Metrodome, Minneapolis, Minnesota

- Date: October 24
- Game time: 12:00 p.m. CDT
- Game weather: None (indoor stadium)
- Game attendance: 64,108
- Referee: Pete Morelli (135)
- Recap, Game Book

Game information

First quarter

- TEN – Gary Anderson 40-yard field goal, 8:19. Titans 3–0. Drive: 9 plays, 28 yards, 4:38.
- MIN – Morten Andersen 29-yard field goal, 0:38. Tied 3–3. Drive: 13 plays, 66 yards, 7:41.

Second quarter

- MIN – Moe Williams 1-yard run (Morten Andersen kick), 11:34. Vikings 10–3. Drive: 5 plays, 66 yards, 3:09.
- MIN – Marcus Robinson 2-yard pass from Daunte Culpepper (Morten Andersen kick), 0:23. Vikings 17–3. Drive: 10 plays, 50 yards, 4:50.

Third quarter

- No scoring plays.

Fourth quarter

- MIN – Morten Andersen 29-yard field goal, 10:17. Vikings 20–3. Drive: 10 plays, 80 yards, 4:35.

Top passers

- TEN – Billy Volek – 17/36, 190 yards, 3 INT
- MIN – Daunte Culpepper – 24/30, 183 yards, TD

Top rushers

- TEN – Chris Brown – 14 rushes, 55 yards
- MIN – Mewelde Moore – 20 rushes, 138 yards

Top receivers

- TEN – Derrick Mason – 8 receptions, 85 yards
- MIN – Nate Burleson – 6 receptions, 53 yards

The Vikings returned home to host the 2–4 Titans. After a Darren Bennett punt, Steve McNair led the Titans down the field, setting up a Gary Anderson 40-yard field goal. The Vikings immediately responded with an eight-minute drive of their own, resulting in a 29-yard Morten Andersen field goal. Steve McNair was injured on the ensuing drive, and was replaced by Billy Volek. Volek was overwhelmed by the Vikings defense, throwing three interceptions, and getting sacked twice. Moe Williams and Marcus Robinson scored on short touchdowns for the Vikings, and Mewelde Moore added 138 yards rushing to ice a defensive second half. The Vikings defense had their season best performance, holding the Titans to 243 yards in the victory, which improved their record to 4–1.

==== Week 8: vs. New York Giants ====
Week 8: New York Giants at Minnesota Vikings – Game summary

Quarter	1	2	3	4	Total
Giants	10	10	7	7	34
Vikings	0	0	0	13	13

at Hubert H. Humphrey Metrodome, Minneapolis, Minnesota

- Date: October 31
- Game time: 12:00 p.m. CST
- Game weather: None (indoor stadium)
- Game attendance: 64,012
- Referee: Larry Nemmers (20)
- Recap, Game Book

Game information

First quarter

- NYG – Steve Christie 50-yard field goal, 11:16. Giants 3–0. Drive: 4 plays, −10 yards, 1:46.
- NYG – Tiki Barber 2-yard run (Steve Christie kick), 8:15. Giants 10–0. Drive: 4 plays, 60 yards, 2:01.

Second quarter

- NYG – Tiki Barber 5-yard run (Steve Christie kick), 13:20. Giants 17–0. Drive: 5 plays, 36 yards, 1:55.
- NYG – Steve Christie 30-yard field goal, 0:05. Giants 20–0. Drive: 11 plays, 49 yards, 4:01.

Third quarter

- NYG – Mike Cloud 1-yard run (Steve Christie kick), 5:39. Giants 27–0. Drive: 8 plays, 55 yards, 4:09.

Fourth quarter

- NYG – Mike Cloud 2-yard run (Steve Christie kick), 12:08. Giants 34–0. Drive: 7 plays, 51 yards, 3:42.
- MIN – Michael Bennett 10-yard run (Morten Andersen kick), 9:01. Giants 34–7. Drive: 8 plays, 68 yards, 3:07.
- MIN – Nate Burleson 1-yard pass from Daunte Culpepper (pass failed), 2:44. Giants 34–13. Drive: 7 plays, 83 yards, 2:15.

Top passers

- NYG – Kurt Warner – 13/21, 144 yards
- MIN – Daunte Culpepper – 24/41, 231 yards, TD, 2 INT

Top rushers

- NYG – Tiki Barber – 24 rushes, 101 yards, 2 TD
- MIN – Daunte Culpepper – 5 rushes, 32 yards

Top receivers

- NYG – Jeremy Shockey – 3 receptions, 60 yards
- MIN – Marcus Robinson – 4 receptions, 91 yards

==== Week 9: at Indianapolis Colts ====
Week 9: Minnesota Vikings at Indianapolis Colts – Game summary

Quarter	1	2	3	4	Total
Vikings	0	6	8	14	28
Colts	7	7	7	10	31

at RCA Dome, Indianapolis, Indiana

- Date: November 8
- Game time: 9:00 p.m. EST/8:00 p.m. CST
- Game weather: None (indoor stadium)
- Game attendance: 57,307
- Referee: Gerry Austin (34)
- Recap, Game Book

Game information

First quarter

- IND – Reggie Wayne 5-yard pass from Peyton Manning (Mike Vanderjagt kick), 9:09. Colts 7–0. Drive: 8 plays, 51 yards, 3:39.

Second quarter

- IND – Marcus Pollard 10-yard pass from Peyton Manning (Mike Vanderjagt kick), 14:54. Colts 14–0. Drive: 11 plays, 78 yards, 6:31.
- MIN – Morten Andersen 42-yard field goal, 12:43. Colts 14–3. Drive: 4 plays, 6 yards, 2:11.
- MIN – Morten Andersen 23-yard field goal, 0:00. Colts 14–6. Drive: 13 plays, 87 yards, 5:16.

Third quarter

- MIN – Nate Burleson 91-yard punt return (Daunte Culpepper run), 10:49. Tied 14–14.
- IND – Dallas Clark 4-yard pass from Peyton Manning (Mike Vanderjagt kick), 2:07. Colts 21–14. Drive: 7 plays, 87 yards, 3:13.

Fourth quarter

- MIN – Nate Burleson 8-yard pass from Daunte Culpepper (Morten Andersen kick), 11:27. Tied 21–21. Drive: 10 plays, 71 yards, 5:40.
- IND – Marcus Pollard 19-yard pass from Peyton Manning (Mike Vanderjagt kick), 7:24. Colts 28–21. Drive: 7 plays, 65 yards, 4:03.
- MIN – Onterrio Smith 24-yard run (Morten Andersen kick), 2:54. Tied 28–28. Drive: 7 plays, 65 yards, 4:30.
- IND – Mike Vanderjagt 35-yard field goal, 0:02. Colts 31–28. Drive: 9 plays, 55 yards, 2:52.

Top passers

- MIN – Daunte Culpepper – 16/19, 169 yards, TD
- IND – Peyton Manning – 23/29, 268 yards, 4 TD

Top rushers

- MIN – Onterrio Smith – 13 rushes, 80 yards, TD
- IND – Edgerrin James – 26 rushes, 123 yards

Top receivers

- MIN – Jermaine Wiggins – 5 receptions, 63 yards
- IND – Marvin Harrison – 6 receptions, 81 yards

==== Week 10: at Green Bay Packers ====
Week 10: Minnesota Vikings at Green Bay Packers – Game summary

Quarter	1	2	3	4	Total
Vikings	7	3	7	14	31
Packers	7	17	0	10	34

at Lambeau Field, Green Bay, Wisconsin

- Date: November 14
- Game time: 3:15 p.m. CST
- Game weather: Partly cloudy, 46 °F (8 °C)
- Game attendance: 70,671
- Referee: Ron Winter (14)
- Recap, Game Book

Game information

First quarter

- GB – Javon Walker 50-yard pass from Brett Favre (Ryan Longwell kick), 11:08. Packers 7–0. Drive: 8 plays, 73 yards, 3:52.
- MIN – Jermaine Wiggins 13-yard pass from Daunte Culpepper (Morten Andersen kick), 6:25. Tied 7–7. Drive: 9 plays, 71 yards, 4:43.

Second quarter

- GB – Tony Fisher 2-yard pass from Brett Favre (Ryan Longwell kick), 14:09. Packers 14–7. Drive: 9 plays, 65 yards, 3:39.
- MIN – Morten Andersen 21-yard field goal, 8:47. Packers 14–10. Drive: 11 plays, 63 yards, 5:22.
- GB – Bubba Franks 17-yard pass from Brett Favre (Ryan Longwell kick), 7:27. Packers 21–10. Drive: 3 plays, 69 yards, 1:20.
- GB – Ryan Longwell 43-yard field goal, 0:00. Packers 24–10. Drive: 14 plays, 63 yards, 4:32.

Third quarter

- MIN – Nate Burleson 8-yard pass from Daunte Culpepper (Morten Andersen kick), 2:39. Packers 24–17. Drive: 5 plays, 54 yards, 2:14.

Fourth quarter

- GB – William Henderson 6-yard pass from Brett Favre (Ryan Longwell kick), 13:24. Packers 31–17. Drive: 8 plays, 35 yards, 4:15.
- MIN – Onterrio Smith 2-yard pass from Daunte Culpepper (Morten Andersen kick), 2:53. Packers 31–24. Drive: 16 plays, 86 yards, 5:56.
- MIN – Moe Williams 17-yard pass from Daunte Culpepper (Morten Andersen kick), 1:20. Tied 31–31. Drive: 3 plays, 66 yards, 0:58.
- GB – Ryan Longwell 33-yard field goal, 0:00. Packers 34–31. Drive: 5 plays, 39 yards, 1:20.

Top passers

- MIN – Daunte Culpepper – 27/44, 363 yards, 4 TD
- GB – Brett Favre – 20/29, 236 yards, 4 TD

Top rushers

- MIN – Michael Bennett – 5 rushes, 21 yards
- MIN – Onterrio Smith – 5 rushes, 21 yards
- GB – Ahman Green – 21 rushes, 145 yards

Top receivers

- MIN – Nate Burleson – 11 receptions, 141 yards, TD
- GB – Javon Walker – 3 receptions, 74 yards, TD

==== Week 11: vs. Detroit Lions ====
Week 11: Detroit Lions at Minnesota Vikings – Game summary

Quarter	1	2	3	4	Total
Lions	14	3	2	0	19
Vikings	7	0	0	15	22

at Hubert H. Humphrey Metrodome, Minneapolis, Minnesota

- Date: November 21
- Game time: 12:00 p.m. CST
- Game weather: None (indoor stadium)
- Game attendance: 64,156
- Referee: Ed Hochuli (85)
- Recap, Game Book

Game information

First quarter

- DET – Eddie Drummond 92-yard kickoff return (Jason Hanson kick), 14:48. Lions 7–0. Drive: 0 plays, 0 yards, 0:12.
- MIN – Jermaine Wiggins 8-yard pass from Daunte Culpepper (Morten Andersen kick), 13:18. Tied 7–7. Drive: 3 plays, 80 yards, 1:30.
- DET – Stephen Alexander 1-yard pass from Joey Harrington (Jason Hanson kick), 5:53. Lions 14–7. Drive: 14 plays, 60 yards, 7:25.

Second quarter

- DET – Jason Hanson 48-yard field goal, 3:33. Lions 17–7. Drive: 12 plays, 62 yards, 6:27.

Third quarter

- DET – Onterrio Smith tackled in the end zone by Cory Redding for a safety, 9:29. Lions 19–7.

Fourth quarter

- MIN – Nate Burleson 6-yard pass from Daunte Culpepper (Daunte Culpepper–Nate Burleson pass), 14:17. Lions 19–15. Drive: 17 plays, 78 yards, 8:11.
- MIN – Moe Williams 1-yard run (Morten Andersen kick), 5:27. Vikings 22–19. Drive: 13 plays, 62 yards, 6:30.

Top passers

- DET – Joey Harrington – 12/19, 91 yards, TD, INT
- MIN – Daunte Culpepper – 22/32, 233 yards, 2 TD, INT

Top rushers

- DET – Kevin Jones – 19 rushes, 100 yards
- MIN – Daunte Culpepper – 11 rushes, 35 yards

Top receivers

- DET – Stephen Alexander – 4 receptions, 27 yards
- MIN – Kelly Campbell – 1 reception, 61 yards

==== Week 12: vs. Jacksonville Jaguars ====
Week 12: Jacksonville Jaguars at Minnesota Vikings – Game summary

Quarter	1	2	3	4	Total
Jaguars	0	13	0	3	16
Vikings	3	10	7	7	27

at Hubert H. Humphrey Metrodome, Minneapolis, Minnesota

- Date: November 28
- Game time: 12:00 p.m. CDT
- Game weather: None (indoor stadium)
- Game attendance: 64,004
- Referee: Bill Carollo (63)
- Recap, Game Book

Game information

First quarter

- MIN – Morten Andersen 25-yard field goal, 6:32. Vikings 3–0. Drive: 10 plays, 73 yards, 3:56.

Second quarter

- JAX – Brian Jones 26-yard pass from Byron Leftwich (Josh Scobee kick), 13:39. Jaguars 7–3. Drive: 5 plays, 60 yards, 2:38.
- JAX – Josh Scobee 33-yard field goal, 11:23. Jaguars 10–3. Drive: 4 plays, 5 yards, 2:03.
- MIN – Daunte Culpepper 1-yard run (Morten Andersen kick), 6:15. Tied 10–10. Drive: 9 plays, 80 yards, 5:08.
- JAX – Josh Scobee 32-yard field goal, 1:09. Jaguars 13–10. Drive: 10 plays, 46 yards, 5:06.
- MIN – Morten Andersen 33-yard field goal, 0:00. Tied 13–13. Drive: 7 plays, 65 yards, 1:09.

Third quarter

- MIN – Randy Moss 2-yard pass from Daunte Culpepper (Morten Andersen kick), 5:34. Vikings 20–13. Drive: 16 plays, 80 yards, 9:26.

Fourth quarter

- JAX – Josh Scobee 42-yard field goal, 13:28. Vikings 20–16. Drive: 8 plays, 48 yards, 3:56.
- MIN – Kevin Williams 77-yard fumble return (Morten Andersen kick), 1:59. Vikings 27–16.

Top passers

- JAX – Byron Leftwich – 19/34, 235 yards, TD
- MIN – Daunte Culpepper – 19/27, 235 yards, TD, INT

Top rushers

- JAX – Fred Taylor – 22 rushes, 147 yards
- MIN – Onterrio Smith – 20 rushes, 72 yards

Top receivers

- JAX – Jimmy Smith – 4 receptions, 68 yards
- MIN – Jermaine Wiggins – 4 receptions, 55 yards

==== Week 13: at Chicago Bears ====
Week 13: Minnesota Vikings at Chicago Bears – Game summary

Quarter	1	2	3	4	Total
Vikings	7	7	0	0	14
Bears	7	10	0	7	24

at Soldier Field, Chicago, Illinois

- Date: December 5
- Game time: 12:00 p.m. CST
- Game weather: Partly cloudy, 45 °F (7 °C)
- Game attendance: 62,051
- Referee: Tony Corrente (99)
- Recap, Game Book

Game information

First quarter

- CHI – Desmond Clark 6-yard pass from Chad Hutchinson (Paul Edinger kick), 4:47. Bears 7–0. Drive: 9 plays, 37 yards, 4:31.
- MIN – Nate Burleson 4-yard pass from Daunte Culpepper (Morten Andersen kick), 1:19. Tied 7–7. Drive: 7 plays, 72 yards, 3:28.

Second quarter

- CHI – Paul Edinger 53-yard field goal, 11:22. Bears 10–7. Drive: 11 plays, 45 yards, 4:57.
- MIN – Marcus Robinson 40-yard pass from Daunte Culpepper (Morten Andersen kick), 2:23. Vikings 14–10. Drive: 4 plays, 58 yards, 1:33.
- CHI – David Terrell 15-yard pass from Chad Hutchinson (Paul Edinger kick), 0:22. Bears 17–14. Drive: 11 plays, 76 yards, 2:01.

Third quarter

- No scoring plays.

Fourth quarter

- CHI – Jason McKie 5-yard pass from Chad Hutchinson (Paul Edinger kick), 10:23. Bears 24–14. Drive: 13 plays, 72 yards, 6:43.

Top passers

- MIN – Daunte Culpepper – 23/33, 279 yards, 2 TD, 3 INT
- CHI – Chad Hutchinson – 18/30, 213 yards, 3 TD

Top rushers

- MIN – Onterrio Smith – 13 rushes, 79 yards
- CHI – Anthony Thomas – 15 rushes, 55 yards

Top receivers

- MIN – Marcus Robinson – 6 receptions, 90 yards, TD
- CHI – Desmond Clark – 6 receptions, 58 yards, TD

==== Week 14: vs. Seattle Seahawks ====
Week 14: Seattle Seahawks at Minnesota Vikings – Game summary

Quarter	1	2	3	4	Total
Seahawks	7	14	3	3	27
Vikings	10	10	3	0	23

at Hubert H. Humphrey Metrodome, Minneapolis, Minnesota

- Date: December 12
- Game time: 12:00 p.m. CDT
- Game weather: None (indoor stadium)
- Game attendance: 64,110
- Referee: Bill Vinovich (52)
- Recap, Game Book

Game information

First quarter

- MIN – Morten Andersen 48-yard field goal, 10:42. Vikings 3–0. Drive: 8 plays, 45 yards, 4:18.
- MIN – Onterrio Smith 5-yard run (Morten Andersen kick), 3:42. Vikings 10–0. Drive: 6 plays, 72 yards, 3:23.
- SEA – Bobby Engram 35-yard pass from Matt Hasselbeck (Josh Brown kick), 1:12. Vikings 10–7. Drive: 6 plays, 80 yards, 2:30.

Second quarter

- SEA – Shaun Alexander 12-yard pass from Matt Hasselbeck (Josh Brown kick), 12:13. Seahawks 14–10. Drive: 6 plays, 76 yards, 2:29.
- MIN – Morten Andersen 32-yard field goal, 9:48. Seahawks 14–13. Drive: 5 plays, 61 yards, 2:25.
- MIN – Randy Moss 3-yard pass from Daunte Culpepper (Morten Andersen kick), 5:06. Vikings 20–14. Drive: 10 plays, 49 yards, 4:29.
- SEA – Darrell Jackson 19-yard pass from Matt Hasselbeck (Josh Brown kick), 3:05. Seahawks 21–20. Drive: 5 plays, 60 yards, 2:01.

Third quarter

- MIN – Morten Andersen 31-yard field goal, 11:58. Vikings 23–21. Drive: 4 plays, 1 yard, 0:57.
- SEA – Josh Brown 33-yard field goal, 6:42. Seahawks 24–23. Drive: 9 plays, 60 yards, 5:16.

Fourth quarter

- SEA – Josh Brown 28-yard field goal, 3:40. Seahawks 27–23. Drive: 6 plays, 16 yards, 2:49.

Top passers

- SEA – Matt Hasselbeck – 23/34, 334 yards, 3 TD, 2 INT
- MIN – Daunte Culpepper – 21/33, 270 yards, TD

Top rushers

- SEA – Shaun Alexander – 27 rushes, 112 yards
- MIN – Onterrio Smith – 14 rushes, 56 yards, TD

Top receivers

- SEA – Darrell Jackson – 10 receptions, 135 yards, TD
- MIN – Randy Moss – 4 receptions, 104 yards, TD

==== Week 15: at Detroit Lions ====
Week 15: Minnesota Vikings at Detroit Lions – Game summary

Quarter	1	2	3	4	Total
Vikings	7	7	0	0	14
Lions	7	10	0	7	24

at Ford Field, Detroit, Michigan

- Date: December 19
- Game time: 1:00 p.m. EST/12:00 p.m. CST
- Game weather: None (indoor stadium)
- Game attendance: 62,337
- Referee: Bernie Kukar (86)
- Recap, Game Book

Game information

First quarter

- DET – Jason Hanson 32-yard field goal, 8:34. Lions 3–0. Drive: 13 plays, 58 yards, 6:26.
- MIN – Nate Burleson 36-yard pass from Daunte Culpepper (Morten Andersen kick), 1:58. Vikings 7–3. Drive: 12 plays, 85 yards, 6:36.

Second quarter

- MIN – Randy Moss 82-yard pass from Daunte Culpepper (Morten Andersen kick), 9:53. Vikings 14–3. Drive: 3 plays, 68 yards, 1:11.
- DET – Kevin Jones 16-yard run (Jason Hanson kick), 3:21. Vikings 14–10. Drive: 11 plays, 82 yards, 6:32.
- DET – Jason Hanson 23-yard field goal, 0:30. Vikings 14–13. Drive: 8 plays, 66 yards, 1:26.

Third quarter

- No scoring plays.

Fourth quarter

- MIN – Nate Burleson 37-yard pass from Daunte Culpepper (Morten Andersen kick), 8:44. Vikings 21–13. Drive: 8 plays, 68 yards, 3:55.
- DET – Roy Williams 9-yard pass from Joey Harrington (Joey Harrington–Tai Streets pass), 6:11. Tied 21–21. Drive: 6 plays, 82 yards, 2:33.
- MIN – Moe Williams 11-yard run (Morten Andersen kick), 1:37. Vikings 28–21. Drive: 10 plays, 83 yards, 4:34.
- DET – Roy Williams 1-yard pass from Joey Harrington (kick aborted), 0:08. Vikings 28–27. Drive: 9 plays, 80 yards, 1:29.

Top passers

- MIN – Daunte Culpepper – 25/35, 404 yards, 3 TD, INT
- DET – Joey Harrington – 25/44, 361 yards, 2 TD, 2 INT

Top rushers

- MIN – Michael Bennett – 13 rushes, 51 yards
- DET – Kevin Jones – 19 rushes, 79 yards, TD

Top receivers

- MIN – Nate Burleson – 5 receptions, 134 yards, 2 TD
- DET – Az-Zahir Hakim – 4 receptions, 108 yards

==== Week 16: vs. Green Bay Packers ====
Week 16: Green Bay Packers at Minnesota Vikings – Game summary

Quarter	1	2	3	4	Total
Packers	0	17	7	10	34
Vikings	0	21	0	10	31

at Hubert H. Humphrey Metrodome, Minneapolis, Minnesota

- Date: December 24
- Game time: 2:00 p.m. CST
- Game weather: None (indoor stadium)
- Game attendance: 64,311
- Referee: Bill Leavy (127)
- Recap, Game Book

Game information

First quarter

- No scoring plays.

Second quarter

- MIN – Randy Moss 12-yard pass from Daunte Culpepper (Morten Andersen kick), 14:49. Vikings 7–0. Drive: 9 plays, 91 yards, 4:43.
- GB – Ahman Green 1-yard run (Ryan Longwell kick), 6:37. Tied 7–7. Drive: 16 plays, 73 yards, 8:12.
- MIN – Nate Burleson 68-yard pass from Daunte Culpepper (Morten Andersen kick), 6:15. Vikings 14–7. Drive: 1 play, 68 yards, 0:22.
- GB – Bubba Franks 22-yard pass from Brett Favre (Ryan Longwell kick), 1:17. Tied 14–14. Drive: 9 plays, 74 yards, 4:58.
- MIN – Michael Bennett 38-yard pass from Daunte Culpepper (Morten Andersen kick), 0:58. Vikings 21–14. Drive: 1 play, 38 yards, 0:19.
- GB – Ryan Longwell 42-yard field goal, 0:00. Vikings 21–17. Drive: 4 plays, 9 yards, 0:58.

Third quarter

- GB – Javon Walker 9-yard pass from Brett Favre (Ryan Longwell kick), 7:41. Packers 24–21. Drive: 8 plays, 89 yards, 4:18.

Fourth quarter

- MIN – Morten Andersen 29-yard field goal, 14:57. Tied 24–24. Drive: 14 plays, 69 yards, 7:44.
- MIN – Chris Claiborne 15-yard interception return (Morten Andersen kick), 8:18. Vikings 31–24.
- GB – Donald Driver 3-yard pass from Brett Favre (Ryan Longwell kick), 3:34. Tied 31–31. Drive: 13 plays, 80 yards, 4:44.
- GB – Ryan Longwell 29-yard field goal, 0:00. Packers 34–31. Drive: 11 plays, 76 yards, 1:35.

Top passers

- GB – Brett Favre – 30/43, 365 yards, 3 TD, INT
- MIN – Daunte Culpepper – 16/23, 285 yards, 3 TD

Top rushers

- GB – Ahman Green – 19 rushes, 64 yards, TD
- MIN – Michael Bennett – 17 rushes, 92 yards

Top receivers

- GB – Donald Driver – 11 receptions, 162 yards, TD
- MIN – Nate Burleson – 2 receptions, 110 yards, TD

==== Week 17: at Washington Redskins ====
Week 17: Minnesota Vikings at Washington Redskins – Game summary

Quarter	1	2	3	4	Total
Vikings	0	3	7	8	18
Redskins	7	7	0	7	21

at FedExField, Landover, Maryland

- Date: January 2
- Game time: 1:00 p.m. EST/12:00 p.m. CST
- Game weather: Cloudy, 46 °F (8 °C)
- Game attendance: 76,876
- Referee: Bernie Kukar (86)
- Recap, Game Book

Game information

First quarter

- WAS – Chris Cooley 6-yard pass from Patrick Ramsey (Jeff Chandler kick), 10:41. Redskins 7–0. Drive: 8 plays, 32 yards, 4:19.

Second quarter

- MIN – Morten Andersen 23-yard field goal, 11:32. Redskins 7–3. Drive: 14 plays, 67 yards, 7:32.
- WAS – Robert Royal 4-yard pass from Patrick Ramsey (Jeff Chandler kick), 1:17. Redskins 14–3. Drive: 11 plays, 64 yards, 5:55.

Third quarter

- MIN – Randy Moss 28-yard pass from Daunte Culpepper (Morten Andersen kick), 5:41. Redskins 14–10. Drive: 5 plays, 61 yards, 2:49.

Fourth quarter

- WAS – Ladell Betts 1-yard run (Jeff Chandler kick), 10:41. Redskins 21–10. Drive: 5 plays, 71 yards, 2:30.
- MIN – Marcus Robinson 38-yard pass from Daunte Culpepper (Daunte Culpepper–Onterrio Smith pass), 0:02. Redskins 21–18. Drive: 9 plays, 80 yards, 1:56.

Top passers

- MIN – Daunte Culpepper – 27/44, 299 yards, 2 TD
- WAS – Patrick Ramsey – 17/26, 216 yards, 2 TD, INT

Top rushers

- MIN – Daunte Culpepper – 2 rushes, 24 yards
- WAS – Ladell Betts – 26 rushes, 118 yards, TD

Top receivers

- MIN – Randy Moss – 5 receptions, 66 yards, TD
- WAS – James Thrash – 5 receptions, 81 yards

== Standings ==
NFC North
	W	L	T	PCT	DIV	CONF	PF	PA	STK
^{(3)} Green Bay Packers	10	6	0	.625	5–1	9–3	424	380	W2
^{(6)} Minnesota Vikings	8	8	0	.500	3–3	5–7	405	395	L2
Detroit Lions	6	10	0	.375	2–4	5–7	296	350	L1
Chicago Bears	5	11	0	.313	2–4	4–8	231	331	L4

NFC
#	Team	Division	W	L	T	PCT	DIV	CONF	SOS	SOV	STK
Division leaders
1	Philadelphia Eagles	East	13	3	0	.813	6–0	11–1	.453	.409	L2
2	Atlanta Falcons	South	11	5	0	.688	4–2	8–4	.420	.432	L2
3	Green Bay Packers	North	10	6	0	.625	5–1	9–3	.457	.419	W2
4	Seattle Seahawks	West	9	7	0	.563	3–3	8–4	.445	.368	W2
Wild cards
5 (Note: St. Louis clinched the NFC #5 seed instead of Minnesota or New Orleans based on better conference record (7–5 to Minnesota’s 5–7 to New Orleans’ 6–6).)	St. Louis Rams	West	8	8	0	.500	5–1	7–5	.488	.438	W2
6 (Note: Minnesota clinched the NFC #6 seed instead of New Orleans based on head-to-head victory.)	Minnesota Vikings	North	8	8	0	.500	3–3	5–7	.480	.406	L2
Did not qualify for the postseason
7	New Orleans Saints	South	8	8	0	.500	3–3	6–6	.465	.427	W4
8	Carolina Panthers	South	7	9	0	.438	3–3	6–6	.496	.366	L1
9 (Note: Detroit finished ahead of Arizona and New York Giants based upon head-to-head record (2–0 versus Arizona’s 1–1 and New York Giants’ 0–2). Division tiebreak was initially used to eliminate Dallas and Washington.)	Detroit Lions	North	6	10	0	.375	2–4	5–7	.496	.417	L2
10	Arizona Cardinals	West	6	10	0	.375	2–4	5–7	.461	.417	W1
11 (Note: New York Giants finished ahead of Dallas and Washington in the NFC East based on better head-to-head record (3–1 to Dallas‘ 2–2 to Washington’s 1–3).)	New York Giants	East	6	10	0	.375	3–3	5–7	.516	.417	W1
12 (Note: Dallas finished ahead of Washington in the NFC East based on head-to-head sweep.)	Dallas Cowboys	East	6	10	0	.375	2–4	5–7	.516	.375	L1
13	Washington Redskins	East	6	10	0	.375	1–5	6–6	.477	.333	W1
14 (Note: Tampa Bay finished ahead of Chicago based upon head-to-head victory.)	Tampa Bay Buccaneers	South	5	11	0	.313	2–4	4–8	.477	.413	L4
15	Chicago Bears	North	5	11	0	.313	2–4	4–8	.465	.388	L4
16	San Francisco 49ers	West	2	14	0	.125	2–4	2–10	.488	.375	L3
Tiebreakers (Note: When breaking ties for three or more teams under the NFL's rules, they are first broken within divisions, then comparing only the highest-ranked remaining team from each division.)

== Postseason ==
=== Schedule ===
Week	Date	Opponent	Result	Record	Venue	Attendance	NFL.com recap
Wild Card	January 9	at Green Bay Packers	W 31–17	1–0	Lambeau Field	71,075	Recap
Division	January 16	at Philadelphia Eagles	L 14–27	1–1	Lincoln Financial Field	67,722	Recap

=== Game summaries ===
==== NFC Wild Card Round: at Green Bay Packers ====
NFC Wild Card Round: Minnesota Vikings at Green Bay Packers – Game summary

Quarter	1	2	3	4	Total
Vikings	17	7	0	7	31
Packers	3	7	0	7	17

at Lambeau Field, Green Bay, Wisconsin

- Date: January 9
- Game time: 3:35 p.m. CST
- Game weather: Cloudy, 26 °F (−3 °C)
- Game attendance: 71,075
- Referee: Walt Anderson (66)
- Recap, Game Book

Game information

First quarter

- MIN – Moe Williams 68-yard pass from Daunte Culpepper (Morten Andersen kick), 13:20. Vikings 7–0. Drive: 3 plays, 76 yards, 1:40.
- MIN – Randy Moss 20-yard pass from Daunte Culpepper (Morten Andersen kick), 9:50. Vikings 14–0. Drive: 4 plays, 55 yards, 1:55.
- MIN – Morten Andersen 35-yard field goal, 6:06. Vikings 17–0. Drive: 6 plays, 40 yards, 2:38.
- GB – Ryan Longwell 43-yard field goal, 2:42. Vikings 17–3. Drive: 8 plays, 37 yards, 3:24.

Second quarter

- GB – Bubba Franks 4-yard pass from Brett Favre (Ryan Longwell kick), 10:24. Vikings 17–10. Drive: 10 plays, 57 yards, 5:14.
- MIN – Nate Burleson 19-yard pass from Daunte Culpepper (Morten Andersen kick), 6:33. Vikings 24–10. Drive: 2 plays, 28 yards, 0:41.

Third quarter

- No scoring plays.

Fourth quarter

- GB – Najeh Davenport 1-yard run (Ryan Longwell kick), 13:37. Vikings 24–17. Drive: 9 plays, 78 yards, 4:16.
- MIN – Randy Moss 34-yard pass from Daunte Culpepper (Morten Andersen kick), 10:18. Vikings 31–17. Drive: 6 plays, 66 yards, 3:19.

Top passers

- MIN – Daunte Culpepper – 19/29, 284 yards, 4 TD
- GB – Brett Favre – 22/32, 216 yards, TD, 4 INT

Top rushers

- MIN – Daunte Culpepper – 7 rushes, 47 yards
- GB – Ahman Green – 20 rushes, 80 yards

Top receivers

- MIN – Moe Williams – 2 reception, 72 yards, TD
- GB – Donald Driver – 7 receptions, 78 yards

==== NFC Divisional Round: at Philadelphia Eagles ====
NFC Divisional Round: Minnesota Vikings at Philadelphia Eagles – Game summary

Quarter	1	2	3	4	Total
Vikings	0	7	0	7	14
Eagles	7	14	0	6	27

at Lincoln Financial Field, Philadelphia, Pennsylvania

- Date: January 16
- Game time: 1:00 p.m. EDT/12:00 p.m. CDT
- Game weather: Cloudy, 31 °F (−1 °C)
- Game attendance: 67,722
- Referee: Pete Morelli (135)
- Recap, Game Book

Game information

First quarter

- PHI – Freddie Mitchell 2-yard pass from Donovan McNabb (David Akers kick), 6:18. Eagles 7–0. Drive: 7 plays, 53 yards, 4:34.

Second quarter

- PHI – Brian Westbrook 7-yard pass from Donovan McNabb (David Akers kick), 14:16. Eagles 14–0. Drive: 7 plays, 92 yards, 3:57.
- MIN – Daunte Culpepper 7-yard run (Morten Andersen kick), 10:37. Eagles 14–7. Drive: 6 plays, 58 yards, 3:39.
- PHI – Freddie Mitchell fumble recovery in the end zone (David Akers kick), 10:08. Eagles 21–7. Drive: 2 plays, 46 yards, 0:29.

Third quarter

- No scoring plays.

Fourth quarter

- PHI – David Akers 21-yard field goal, 13:20. Eagles 24–7. Drive: 6 plays, 66 yards, 2:24.
- PHI – David Akers 23-yard field goal, 6:39. Eagles 27–7. Drive: 10 plays, 55 yards, 5:36.
- MIN – Marcus Robinson 32-yard pass from Daunte Culpepper (Morten Andersen kick), 1:59. Eagles 27–14. Drive: 12 plays, 80 yards, 4:40.

Top passers

- MIN – Daunte Culpepper – 24/46, 316 yards, TD, 2 INT
- PHI – Donovan McNabb – 21/33, 286 yards, 2 TD

Top rushers

- MIN – Michael Bennett – 8 rushes, 37 yards
- PHI – Brian Westbrook – 12 rushes, 70 yards

Top receivers

- MIN – Marcus Robinson – 5 receptions, 119 yards, TD
- PHI – Freddie Mitchell – 5 receptions, 65 yards, TD

== Statistics ==
=== Team leaders ===
Category	Player(s)	Value
Passing yards	Daunte Culpepper	4,717 *
Passing touchdowns	Daunte Culpepper	39 *
Rushing yards	Onterrio Smith	544
Rushing touchdowns	Moe Williams	3
Receiving yards	Nate Burleson	1,006
Receiving touchdowns	Randy Moss	13
Points	Morten Andersen	99
Kickoff return yards	Kelly Campbell	760
Punt return yards	Nate Burleson	215
Tackles	E. J. Henderson	93
Sacks	Kevin Williams	11.5
Interceptions	Antoine Winfield	3
Forced fumbles	Lance Johnstone	5

- Vikings' single season record.

=== League rankings ===
Category	Total yards	Yards per game	NFL rank (out of 32)
Passing offense	4,516	282.2	2nd
Rushing offense	1,823	113.9	18th
Total offense	6,339	396.2	4th
Passing defense	3,896	243.5	29th
Rushing defense	2,006	125.4	21st
Total defense	5,902	368.9	28th
