= Kenechi Udeze =

American football player and coach (born 1983)

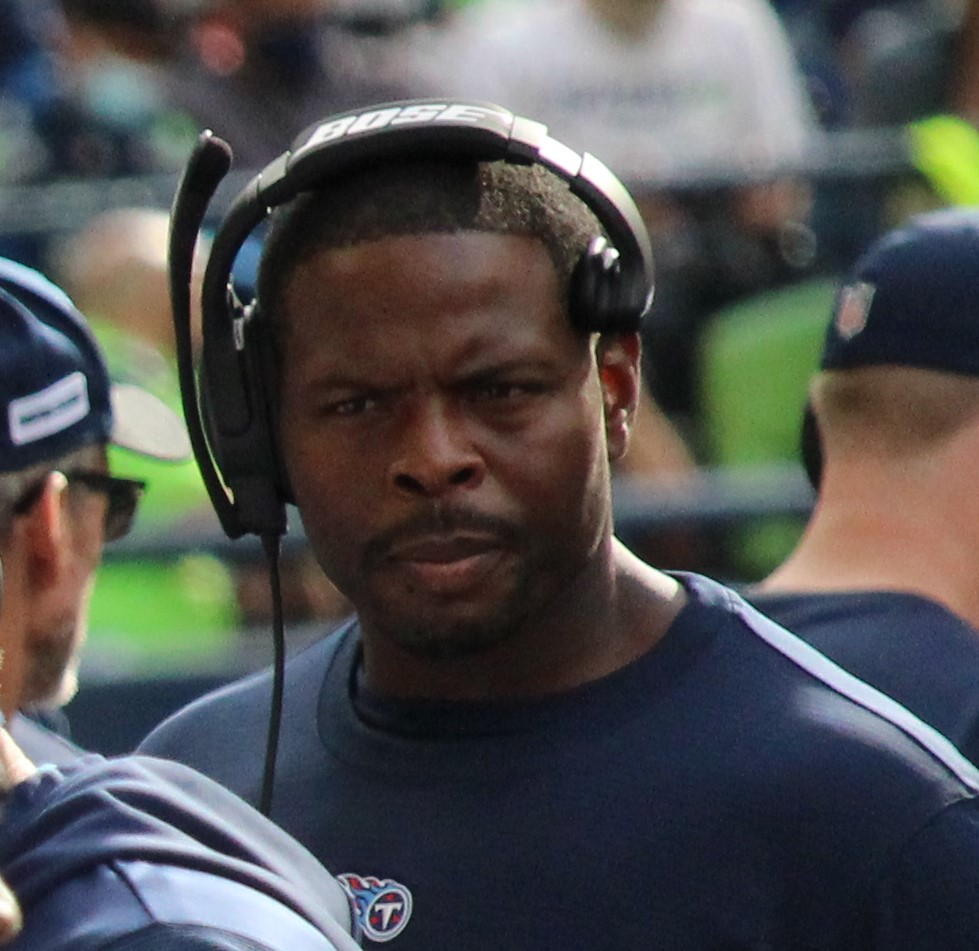
- Udeze with the Tennessee Titans in 2021

Personal information
- Born: March 5, 1983 (age 43); Los Angeles, California, U.S.
- Listed height: 6 ft 3 in (1.91 m)
- Listed weight: 281 lb (127 kg)

Career information
- High school: Verbum Dei (Los Angeles, California)
- College: USC (2001–2003)
- NFL draft: 2004: 1st round, 20th overall pick

Career history

Playing
- Minnesota Vikings (2004–2008)

Coaching
- Washington (2009–2011) Assistant strength and conditioning coach; Seattle Seahawks (2012) Assistant defensive line coach; Minnesota Vikings (2013) Coaching fellowship program; Pittsburgh (2014) Assistant strength and conditioning coach; USC (2015) Assistant strength and conditioning coach; USC (2016–2018) Defensive line coach; LSU (2019) Defensive analyst; Vanderbilt (2020) Linebackers coach; Tennessee Titans (2021–2022) Assistant defensive line coach; Houston (2023) Pass rush specialist; FIU (2024) Assistant coach - outside linebackers; FIU (2025) Defensive line coach

Awards and highlights
- AP national champion (2003); Consensus All-American (2003); First-team All-Pac-10 (2003); Second-team All-Pac-10 (2002); NCAA National Defensive Player of the Year (2003)

Career NFL statistics
- Total tackles: 117
- Sacks: 11
- Forced fumbles: 2
- Fumble recoveries: 3
- Stats at Pro Football Reference

Kenechi Nduka Udeze (/kəˈnɛtʃi uːˈdɛzeɪ/; born March 5, 1983) is an American football coach and former player.

Udeze played in the National Football League (NFL) as a defensive end for four seasons during the early 2000s. He played college football for the University of Southern California (USC), and earned consensus All-American honors. Udeze was selected by the Minnesota Vikings in the first round of the 2004 NFL draft. He was forced to retire in 2008 after he was diagnosed with acute lymphoblastic leukemia.

== Early life ==
Udeze was born in Los Angeles. He attended Verbum Dei High School, a Jesuit-affiliated Roman Catholic school in Los Angeles, where he played high school football for the Verbum Dei Eagles and competed in track as a shot putter (top-throw of 56-7 or 17.34m).

== Playing career ==
=== College ===
While attending the University of Southern California, Udeze played for coach Pete Carroll's USC Trojans football team from 2001 to 2003. He was a three-year starter and helped his team to a 2004 Rose Bowl victory and AP national title as a junior. He finished his college career with 135 tackles (51 of them for a loss), 28 sacks (a school record), 14 forced fumbles, three fumble recoveries, one interception, five pass deflections, and two blocked kicks. As a junior in 2003, he was a first-team All-Pac-10 selection, and was recognized as a consensus first-team All-American.

=== National Football League ===
Pre-draft measurables
Height	Weight	Arm length	Hand span
6 ft 2 7/8 in (1.90 m)	281 lb (127 kg)	33 1/4 in (0.84 m)	10 1/8 in (0.26 m)
All values from NFL Combine

==== Minnesota Vikings ====
Udeze was selected by the Minnesota Vikings in the first round (twentieth overall pick) of the 2004 NFL draft. During his rookie season with the Vikings, he started 15 games and recorded 36 tackles, five sacks, one forced fumble, and one pass deflected. As a second year pro, Udeze was injured in the Vikings third game of the season with cartilage damage in his left knee, which kept him out the rest of the year. Udeze finished the season with three games started, five tackles, and one quarterback sack. In 2006, he was once again the starter at left defensive end, playing 16 games, starting 15 and recorded 29 tackles and no sacks. The following year, he again playing in all 16 games, with 15 starts, and had 47 tackles and five sacks.

==== Illness and retirement ====
On February 11, 2008, it was announced that Udeze was diagnosed by doctors with a form of leukemia: acute lymphoblastic leukemia. KMSP-TV (Ch. 9) also reported that Udeze was at Fairview Southdale Hospital undergoing tests and that he was at the Mayo Clinic in Rochester the week before. Udeze revealed that his acute leukemia is in a state of remission. Udeze received a bone marrow transplant from his brother.

The Vikings placed Udeze on the non-football injury list and eventually injured reserve in July 2008, ending his season. Udeze returned to the Metrodome as an honorary captain for a game against the Green Bay Packers on November 9, 2008, where he said he would return to playing football. "You know what? I'll be back next year," Udeze told the St. Paul Pioneer Press.

Udeze was able to get back into good enough condition to return to the Vikings for 2009 pre-season training, reaching the physical form he was in before his illness. He took 26 snaps during a Vikings mini-camp, but struggled with peripheral neuropathy in his feet, a result of his chemotherapy. The chemotherapy-induced neuropathy caused numbness that kept him from being able to plant firmly and create a burst up the field after the snap. Finding himself unable to move at the level he was accustomed to, Udeze decided to retire, which he announced on July 29, 2009.

== NFL career statistics ==
Legend
**Bold**	Career high

=== Regular season ===
Year	Team	Games		Tackles					Interceptions					Fumbles			
Year	Team	GP	GS	Cmb	Solo	Ast	Sck	TFL	Int	Yds	TD	Lng	PD	FF	FR	Yds	TD
2004	MIN	**16**	**15**	36	25	**11**	**5.0**	6	0	0	0	0	**2**	**1**	**1**	-2	0
2005	MIN	3	2	5	5	0	1.0	1	0	0	0	0	0	0	0	0	0
2006	MIN	**16**	**15**	29	19	10	0.0	7	0	0	0	0	0	0	1	0	0
2007	MIN	**16**	**15**	**47**	**37**	10	**5.0**	**9**	0	0	0	0	1	**1**	**1**	**37**	0
		51	47	117	86	31	11.0	23	0	0	0	0	3	2	3	35	0

=== Playoffs ===
Year	Team	Games		Tackles					Interceptions					Fumbles			
Year	Team	GP	GS	Cmb	Solo	Ast	Sck	TFL	Int	Yds	TD	Lng	PD	FF	FR	Yds	TD
2004	MIN	**2**	0	**4**	**2**	**2**	0.0	**1**	0	0	0	0	0	0	**1**	0	0
		2	0	4	2	2	0.0	1	0	0	0	0	0	0	1	0	0

== Coaching career ==
=== Washington ===
In 2009, Udeze joined University of Washington as their assistant strength and conditioning coach. Udeze was hired by the former USC assistant coach Steve Sarkisian, who had become head coach at Washington. He also worked with the defensive line. He also works heavily with charities that help raise money for cancer research.

=== Seattle Seahawks ===
In 2012, Udeze was hired as an assistant defensive line coach for the Seattle Seahawks.

=== Minnesota Vikings ===
In 2013, Udeze completed the Bill Walsh NFL Minority Coaching Fellowship program with the Minnesota Vikings.

=== Pittsburgh ===
In 2014, Udeze was hired as an assistant strength and conditioning coach at the University of Pittsburgh.

=== USC ===
In 2015, Udeze returned to his alma mater, University of Southern California, to work as an assistant strength and conditioning coach, where he rejoined former Washington coaches Steve Sarkisian and Ivan Lewis. In 2016, he was made defensive line coach.

=== LSU ===
In 2019, Udeze was hired as a Defensive Analyst at Louisiana State University, reuniting with his former defensive line coach at USC Ed Orgeron, who is now the head coach at LSU.

=== Vanderbilt ===
On January 21, 2020, Udeze joined Vanderbilt University as their linebackers coach.

=== Tennessee Titans ===
On January 29, 2021, Udeze was hired by the Tennessee Titans as their assistant defensive line coach under head coach Mike Vrabel.

=== Houston ===
In 2023, Udeze joined the University of Houston staff as a pass rush specialist.

=== FIU ===
In 2024, Udeze joined FIU as an outside linebackers assistant coach.

== Personal life ==
During his illness, Udeze decided to return to USC, where he resumed taking classes. In May 2010, Udeze graduated with a degree in sociology.
