= Dontarrious Thomas =

American football player (born 1980)

No. 54, 55, 56
- Position: Linebacker

Personal information
- Born: September 2, 1980 (age 46); Perry, Georgia, U.S.
- Listed height: 6 ft 2 in (1.88 m)
- Listed weight: 241 lb (109 kg)

Career information
- High school: Perry
- College: Auburn (1999–2003)
- NFL draft: 2004: 2nd round, 48th overall pick

Career history
- Minnesota Vikings (2004–2007); San Francisco 49ers (2008)*; Minnesota Vikings (2008); California Redwoods (2009); San Diego Chargers (2009); Sacramento Mountain Lions (2010–2011)
- * Offseason or practice squad member only

Awards and highlights
- First-team All-SEC (2003); Second-team All-SEC (2001)

Career NFL statistics
- Total tackles: 144
- Sacks: 1.5
- Forced fumbles: 1
- Stats at Pro Football Reference

Dontarrious Dewayne Thomas (born September 2, 1980) is an American former professional football player who was a linebacker in the National Football League (NFL). He played college football for the Auburn Tigers. He was selected by the Minnesota Vikings in the second round of the 2004 NFL draft.

Thomas was also a member of the San Francisco 49ers, California Redwoods, San Diego Chargers, and Sacramento Mountain Lions.

== Early life ==
At Perry High School in Perry, Georgia, Thomas was a three sport standout in football, basketball, and track. In football, he was a Class 2-A-All-State selection, and as a senior, had 6 interceptions, returned an interception for a touchdown, had 78 tackles (50 solo tackles, 28 assisted), and rushed for 278 yards on only 14 carries (19.9 yd. per rush avg.).

== Professional career ==
Pre-draft measurables
Height	Weight	Arm length	Hand span	40-yard dash	10-yard split	20-yard split	20-yard shuttle	Three-cone drill	Vertical jump	Broad jump	Bench press
6 ft 2 1/2 in (1.89 m)	247 lb (112 kg)	32 1/4 in (0.82 m)	9 1/2 in (0.24 m)	4.54 s	1.65 s	2.71 s	4.00 s	7.39 s	38.5 in (0.98 m)	10 ft 9 in (3.28 m)	26 reps
All values from NFL Combine/Pro Day

=== Minnesota Vikings (first stint) ===
Thomas was selected by the Minnesota Vikings in the second round (48th overall) of the 2004 NFL draft. He played four seasons with the Vikings, appearing in 59 games (10 starts) and recording 143 tackles, 1.5 sacks, and a forced fumble.

=== San Francisco 49ers ===
Thomas was originally signed No. 51 upon signing with the 49ers in 2008. When linebacker Brandon Moore was released in August, Thomas switched to Moore's #56 while the newly signed Takeo Spikes took 51.

However, on August 31, 2008, Thomas was released by the 49ers to make room for linebacker Ahmad Brooks.

=== Minnesota Vikings (second stint) ===
Thomas was signed by the Vikings on October 13, 2008, when offensive tackle Drew Radovich was placed on injured reserve. Thomas appeared in four games for the Vikings that season, recording one assisted tackle.

=== California Redwoods ===
Thomas signed with the California Redwoods of the United Football League in 2009 and recorded 35 tackles.

=== San Diego Chargers ===
Thomas was signed by the San Diego Chargers on January 5, 2010, after linebacker James Holt was placed on injured reserve.

=== NFL statistics ===
Year	Team	GP	COMB	TOTAL	AST	SACK	FF	FR	FR YDS	INT	IR YDS	AVG IR	LNG	TD	PD
2004	MIN	16	59	42	17	0.5	1	1	0	0	0	0	0	0	0
2005	MIN	14	48	35	13	0.0	0	0	0	0	0	0	0	0	2
2006	MIN	16	31	20	11	1.0	0	0	0	0	0	0	0	0	0
2007	MIN	13	5	5	0	0.0	0	0	0	0	0	0	0	0	0
2008	MIN	4	1	0	1	0.0	0	1	0	0	0	0	0	0	0
Career		63	144	102	42	1.5	1	2	0	0	0	0	0	0	2
