= 2004 New Orleans Saints season =

NFL team season

- General manager: Mickey Loomis
- Head coach: Jim Haslett
- Home stadium: Louisiana Superdome

Results
- Record: 8–8
- Division place: 2nd NFC South
- Playoffs: Did not qualify
- All-Pros: None
- Pro Bowlers: Mitch Berger (P); Joe Horn (WR)

The 2004 season was the New Orleans Saints' 38th in the National Football League (NFL) and fifth under head coach Jim Haslett. They matched their previous season's output of 8–8, and the team finished the season on a four-game winning streak, which was all the more remarkable because the Saints trailed at some point during every game. This record was equalled by the 2012 Cowboys, but before this season the 1978 Falcons and the 2002 Browns come closest to this record, winning eight games out of fifteen where they trailed at some point.

== Offseason ==
=== NFL draft ===
2004 New Orleans Saints draft
| Round | Pick | Player | Position | College | Notes |
| 1 | 18 | Will Smith * | Defensive end | Ohio State | |
| 2 | 50 | Devery Henderson | Wide receiver | LSU | |
| 2 | 60 | Courtney Watson | Linebacker | Notre Dame | |
| 5 | 139 | Rodney Leisle | Defensive tackle | UCLA | |
| 5 | 156 | Mike Karney | Fullback | Arizona State | |
| 7 | 240 | Colby Bockwoldt | Linebacker | BYU | |
Made roster * Made at least one Pro Bowl during career

== Personnel ==
=== Staff ===
2004 New Orleans Saints staff
| Front office: Owner – Tom Benson; Executive vice president/general manager – Mickey Loomis; Senior football administrator – Russ Ball; Director of player personnel – Rick Mueller; Director of college scouting – Rick Reiprish; College scouting coordinator – Rick Thompson; Head coaches: Head coach – Jim Haslett; Offensive coaches: Offensive coordinator – Mike McCarthy; Quarterbacks – Mike Sheppard; Running backs – Dave Atkins; Wide receivers – Jimmy Robinson; Assistant wide receivers – Danny Langsdorf; Tight ends – Bob Palcic; Offensive line – Jack Henry; Offensive assistant/quality control – Chip Beake | Defensive coaches: Defensive coordinator – Rick Venturi; Defensive line – John Pease; Linebackers – Winston Moss; Secondary – Joe Baker; Secondary/cornerbacks – Greg Brown; Defensive assistant/quality control – Ty Knott; Defensive assistant/special projects – Joe Alley; Special teams coaches: Special teams coordinator – Al Everest; Assistant special teams – Danny Langsdorf; Strength and conditioning: Strength and conditioning – Rock Gullickson; Assistant strength and conditioning – Mark Smith |

=== Roster ===
2004 New Orleans Saints roster
| Quarterbacks (QB): 4 Todd Bouman; 2 Aaron Brooks; Running backs (RB): 44 Mike Karney FB; 25 Fred McAfee; 26 Deuce McAllister; 27 Aaron Stecker; Wide receivers (WR): 88 Talman Gardner; 19 Devery Henderson; 87 Joe Horn; 84 Michael Lewis; 80 Jerome Pathon; 83 Donté Stallworth; Tight ends (TE): 85 Ernie Conwell; 89 Lamont Hall; 81 Zach Hilton; 82 Boo Williams | Offensive linemen (OL): 65 LeCharles Bentley C; 71 Spencer Folau G; 72 Wayne Gandy OT; 61 Montrae Holland G; 64 Kendyl Jacox G; 67 Jamar Nesbit G; 68 Victor Riley OT; 78 Jon Stinchcomb OT; Defensive linemen (DL): 92 Tony Bryant DE; 94 Charles Grant DE; 95 Howard Green DT; 93 Darren Howard DE; 75 Rodney Leisle DT; 91 Will Smith DE; 97 Johnathan Sullivan DT; 98 Willie Whitehead DE; 66 Brian Young DT | Linebackers (LB): 50 James Allen OLB; 57 Colby Bockwoldt OLB; 52 Sedrick Hodge OLB; 53 Roger Knight; 51 Terrence Melton OLB; 56 Orlando Ruff MLB; 54 Darrin Smith OLB; 55 Courtney Watson MLB; Defensive backs (DB): 20 Jay Bellamy SS; 35 Fakhir Brown CB; 21 Jason Craft CB; 37 Steve Gleason SS; 34 Tebucky Jones FS; 43 Mike McKenzie CB; 40 Mel Mitchell FS; 24 Monty Montgomery CB; 22 Fred Thomas CB; Special teams (ST): 17 Mitch Berger P; 3 John Carney K; 47 Kevin Houser LS | Practice squad: 60 Ben Archibald OT; 30 Fred Booker CB; 96 Jeremiah Garrison LB; 74 Augie Hoffmann G; 12 Kliff Kingsbury QB; 15 Brian Poli-Dixon WR; 46 Nate Schurman FB; 63 Chad Setterstrom G; Reserve: 33 Ashley Ambrose CB (IR); 29 Keyuo Craver CB (Susp.); 58 Cie Grant MLB (IR); 59 Derrick Rodgers OLB (IR); 90 Kenny Smith DT (IR); Rookies in italics 53 active, 5 reserve, 8 practice squad |

== Regular season ==
=== Schedule ===
During the 2004 regular season, the Saints' non-divisional conference opponents were primarily from the NFC West, although they also played the Minnesota Vikings from the NFC North, and the Dallas Cowboys from the NFC East. Their non-conference opponents were from the AFC West.

| Week | Date | Opponent | Result | Record | Venue | Attendance |
|---|---|---|---|---|---|---|
| 1 | September 12 | Seattle Seahawks | **L** 7–21 | 0–1 | Louisiana Superdome | 64,900 |
| 2 | September 19 | San Francisco 49ers | **W** 30–27 | 1–1 | Louisiana Superdome | 64,900 |
| 3 | September 26 | at St. Louis Rams | **W** 28–25 (OT) | 2–1 | Edward Jones Dome | 65,856 |
| 4 | October 3 | at Arizona Cardinals | **L** 10–34 | 2–2 | Sun Devil Stadium | 28,109 |
| 5 | October 10 | **Tampa Bay Buccaneers** | **L** 17–20 | 2–3 | Louisiana Superdome | 64,900 |
| 6 | October 17 | Minnesota Vikings | **L** 31–38 | 2–4 | Louisiana Superdome | 64,900 |
| 7 | October 24 | at Oakland Raiders | **W** 31–26 | 3–4 | Network Associates Coliseum | 45,337 |
| 8 | Bye | | | | | |
| 9 | November 7 | at San Diego Chargers | **L** 17–43 | 3–5 | Qualcomm Stadium | 59,662 |
| 10 | November 14 | Kansas City Chiefs | **W** 27–20 | 4–5 | Louisiana Superdome | 64,900 |
| 11 | November 21 | Denver Broncos | **L** 13–34 | 4–6 | Louisiana Superdome | 64,900 |
| 12 | November 28 | at **Atlanta Falcons** | **L** 21–24 | 4–7 | Georgia Dome | 70,521 |
| 13 | December 5 | **Carolina Panthers** | **L** 21–32 | 4–8 | Louisiana Superdome | 58,878 |
| 14 | December 12 | at Dallas Cowboys | **W** 27–13 | 5–8 | Texas Stadium | 64,056 |
| 15 | December 19 | at **Tampa Bay Buccaneers** | **W** 21–17 | 6–8 | Raymond James Stadium | 65,075 |
| 16 | December 26 | **Atlanta Falcons** | **W** 26–13 | 7–8 | Louisiana Superdome | 64,900 |
| 17 | January 2 | at **Carolina Panthers** | **W** 21–18 | 8–8 | Bank of America Stadium | 73,302 |
Note: Intra-divisional opponents are in **bold** text.

=== Standings ===
NFC South
| | W | L | T | PCT | DIV | CONF | PF | PA | STK |
|---|---|---|---|---|---|---|---|---|---|
| ^{(2)} Atlanta Falcons | 11 | 5 | 0 | .688 | 4–2 | 8–4 | 340 | 337 | L2 |
| New Orleans Saints | 8 | 8 | 0 | .500 | 3–3 | 6–6 | 348 | 405 | W4 |
| Carolina Panthers | 7 | 9 | 0 | .438 | 3–3 | 6–6 | 355 | 339 | L1 |
| Tampa Bay Buccaneers | 5 | 11 | 0 | .313 | 2–4 | 4–8 | 301 | 304 | L4 |

NFC
| # | Team | Division | W | L | T | PCT | DIV | CONF | SOS | SOV | STK |
|---|---|---|---|---|---|---|---|---|---|---|---|
**Division leaders**
| 1 | Philadelphia Eagles | East | 13 | 3 | 0 | .813 | 6–0 | 11–1 | .453 | .409 | L2 |
| 2 | Atlanta Falcons | South | 11 | 5 | 0 | .688 | 4–2 | 8–4 | .420 | .432 | L2 |
| 3 | Green Bay Packers | North | 10 | 6 | 0 | .625 | 5–1 | 9–3 | .457 | .419 | W2 |
| 4 | Seattle Seahawks | West | 9 | 7 | 0 | .563 | 3–3 | 8–4 | .445 | .368 | W2 |
**Wild cards**
| 5 (Note: St. Louis clinched the NFC #5 seed instead of Minnesota or New Orleans based on better conference record (7–5 to Minnesota’s 5–7 to New Orleans’ 6–6).) | St. Louis Rams | West | 8 | 8 | 0 | .500 | 5–1 | 7–5 | .488 | .438 | W2 |
| 6 (Note: Minnesota clinched the NFC #6 seed instead of New Orleans based on head-to-head victory.) | Minnesota Vikings | North | 8 | 8 | 0 | .500 | 3–3 | 5–7 | .480 | .406 | L2 |
**Did not qualify for the postseason**
| 7 | New Orleans Saints | South | 8 | 8 | 0 | .500 | 3–3 | 6–6 | .465 | .427 | W4 |
| 8 | Carolina Panthers | South | 7 | 9 | 0 | .438 | 3–3 | 6–6 | .496 | .366 | L1 |
| 9 (Note: Detroit finished ahead of Arizona and New York Giants based upon head-to-head record (2–0 versus Arizona’s 1–1 and New York Giants’ 0–2). Division tiebreak was initially used to eliminate Dallas and Washington.) | Detroit Lions | North | 6 | 10 | 0 | .375 | 2–4 | 5–7 | .496 | .417 | L2 |
| 10 | Arizona Cardinals | West | 6 | 10 | 0 | .375 | 2–4 | 5–7 | .461 | .417 | W1 |
| 11 (Note: New York Giants finished ahead of Dallas and Washington in the NFC East based on better head-to-head record (3–1 to Dallas‘ 2–2 to Washington’s 1–3).) | New York Giants | East | 6 | 10 | 0 | .375 | 3–3 | 5–7 | .516 | .417 | W1 |
| 12 (Note: Dallas finished ahead of Washington in the NFC East based on head-to-head sweep.) | Dallas Cowboys | East | 6 | 10 | 0 | .375 | 2–4 | 5–7 | .516 | .375 | L1 |
| 13 | Washington Redskins | East | 6 | 10 | 0 | .375 | 1–5 | 6–6 | .477 | .333 | W1 |
| 14 (Note: Tampa Bay finished ahead of Chicago based upon head-to-head victory.) | Tampa Bay Buccaneers | South | 5 | 11 | 0 | .313 | 2–4 | 4–8 | .477 | .413 | L4 |
| 15 | Chicago Bears | North | 5 | 11 | 0 | .313 | 2–4 | 4–8 | .465 | .388 | L4 |
| 16 | San Francisco 49ers | West | 2 | 14 | 0 | .125 | 2–4 | 2–10 | .488 | .375 | L3 |
**Tiebreakers** (Note: When breaking ties for three or more teams under the NFL's rules, they are first broken within divisions, then comparing only the highest-ranked remaining team from each division.)
