= Sean Tufts =

American football player (born 1982)

No. 57
- Position: Linebacker

Personal information
- Born: March 26, 1982 (age 44); Englewood, Colorado, U.S.
- Listed height: 6 ft 4 in (1.93 m)
- Listed weight: 240 lb (109 kg)

Career information
- High school: Cherry Creek (CO)
- College: Colorado (2000–2003)
- NFL draft: 2004: 6th round, 196th overall pick

Career history
- Carolina Panthers (2004–2006)

Career NFL statistics
- Tackles: 11
- Fumble recoveries: 1
- Stats at Pro Football Reference

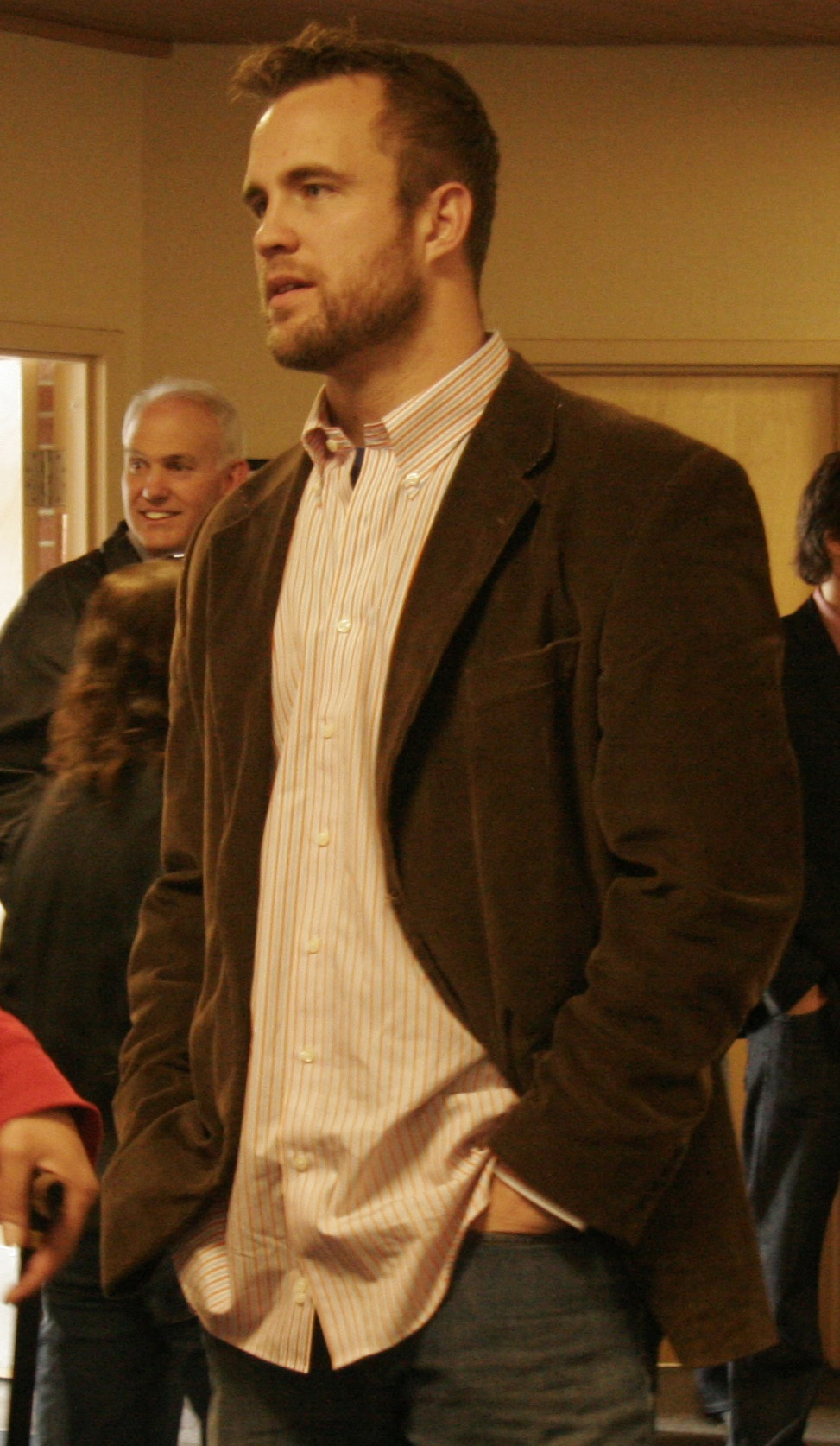
Sean Tufts in 2012

Sean Tufts (born March 26, 1982) is an American former professional football player who was a linebacker for the Carolina Panthers of the National Football League (NFL). He played college football for the Colorado Buffaloes.

== College career ==
At the University of Colorado Boulder, Tufts was the Buffaloes' starting middle linebacker from 2001–2003. Including the 2001 Big 12 Championship season. His senior year, Tufts was voted Captain and was placed on the Butkus Award watch list. He averaged 8 tackles per game and finished the 2003 season with 95 tackles. In 2004, Tufts was selected in the 6th round of the 2004 NFL draft by the Carolina Panthers.

== Professional career ==
Tufts was the 196th pick overall, taken by the Carolina Panthers, in the 2004 NFL draft. He was used sparingly in 2004, playing in the season's final three games. In 2005, he backed up Pro Bowler Dan Morgan and played on special teams. Knee injuries forced Tufts to the sidelines for the 2006 season. Over his career Tufts played in 18 games for the Panthers and totaled 16 career tackles, with one recovered fumble.

== Post-football career ==
After retiring from the NFL in 2006, Tufts returned to the University of Colorado at Boulder to pursue his Master of Business Administration at the university's Leeds School of Business. There, Tufts majored in Energy and Finance, was voted Class President and was the Director of the Net Impact Case Competition. While pursuing his MBA, Tufts joined the Ralphie Handlers, a group responsible for leading Ralphie the Buffalo, the Colorado Buffaloes' mascot onto the field before every Colorado home football game. Tufts was the first and only former CU football player to run Ralphie.

Tufts began has post-football professional career in wind energy as a Development Manager for RES Americas, based in Broomfield, Colorado. He assisted in development of 460MW of wind energy projects in North America. In late 2011, Tufts, along with former Colorado teammate Jeremy Bloom, was selected to Forbes' inaugural "30 Under 30", a list of 30 young entrepreneurs, for his work in the energy sector.

He left RES Americas in 2013 to take a role with General Electric where he served as a Global Key Account Manager for vendors in the utility and oil and gas space. In May 2014, GE acquired the industrial cyber security company, Wurldtech, and recruited Tufts to sell security solutions in the mid-stream, LNG, offshore drilling, mining, and renewable markets.

In 2017, Tufts joined Denver based Optiv, as the Director of OT Security. He also served as ISSA Denver Oil and Gas Special Interest Group coordinator..

In 2025, he joined Claroty as Field CTO. Claroty is a market leader in OT/CPS Cybersecurity. Sean is frequently cited on current hacking attempts on Critical Infrastructure.

- New York Times https://www.nytimes.com/2026/11/02/business/cyberattack-freezers-europe-us-army.html?searchResultPosition=1
- Reuters https://www.reuters.com/legal/government/ai-sharpens-cat-and-mouse-hacking-battle-companies-strengthen-defences-2026-11-05/
- Dark Reading
- Security Magazine
- SANS
- Medium
- Digital Fight Club
- CIO Inc.

Tufts was appointed to president of the Buffs4Life Foundation in June 2018. The foundation focuses on Mental Health for former athletes at the University of Colorado, Boulder. The group has raised over $750K since its formation in 2004. This includes major fundraisers for over 50 former athletes including John Hessler, Chancellor Lee Adams and more. Tufts has been locally and nationally recognized for his work with the foundation including features on 9News, Denver Post, Pac12 Network, ESPN and Fox Sports.

== Personal life ==
Sean grew up in Centennial, Colorado. On June 26, 2010, Tufts married Orly Ripmaster, a former soccer and lacrosse player at Harvard University, in Vail, Colorado.They have two young children and reside on a farm in Boulder County, CO
