= Antoine Burns =

American football player and coach (born 1979)

No. 5
- Position: Wide receiver

Personal information
- Born: October 31, 1979 (age 47)
- Listed height: 6 ft 0 in (1.83 m)
- Listed weight: 195 lb (88 kg)

Career information
- High school: North Division (Milwaukee, Wisconsin)
- College: Minnesota
- NFL draft: 2003: undrafted

Career history
- Cleveland Browns (2003)*; Seattle Seahawks (2003)*; → Amsterdam Admirals (2004); Carolina Panthers (2004)*; Los Angeles Avengers (2006); Green Bay Blizzard (2008); Milwaukee Iron/Mustangs (2009–2011)
- * Offseason or practice squad member only
- Stats at ArenaFan.com

Antoine Burns (born October 31, 1979) is an American former football wide receiver.

== Early life ==
Burns played football at North Division High School in Milwaukee, Wisconsin. He also played basketball and was a member of the track & field team.

== College career ==
Burns began his collegiate career at Rochester Community and Technical College where he was selected as a junior college All-American. He earned a scholarship to the University of Minnesota where he was an All-Big Ten Conference selection in his junior and senior years. Burns finished his collegiate career with 75 receptions for 1,006 yards and seven touchdowns. He also returned 13 kickoffs for 253 yards. As a senior in 2002, Burns led the Golden Gophers with 44 catches for 526 yards and four scores.

== Professional career ==
Antoine Burns signed with the Cleveland Browns following the 2003 NFL draft. After being waived, he was signed to the Seattle Seahawks' practice squad. Seattle allocated Burns to the Amsterdam Admirals of the NFL Europe, but he injured his ankle in the first game of the season. In 2004, he moved to the practice squad of the Carolina Panthers.

In 2006 Burns, an AFL rookie with the Los Angeles Avengers, set a single-season team record for kickoff return yardage. In 10 games he returned 51 kickoffs for 984 yards and two touchdowns. His record broke the team's single-season record of 956 set by Kevin Ingram in 2004. Burns also finished the 2006 season with 19 receptions for 239 yards. In addition, he ran the ball three times for 22 yards and averaged a team-high 124.5 all-purpose yards per game.

Burns played for the Green Bay Blizzard of the af2 in 2008. He joined the af2's Milwaukee Iron in 2009.

== Coaching career ==
Burns served as the Assistant Head Coach and Receivers Coach with the Club Status program at the University of Wisconsin-Milwaukee from 2013 to 2016 (Milwaukee Panthers football). He also has spent time coaching at his alma mater, Milwaukee North Division, and at Milwaukee Vincent High school.

Burns has also as a Director of NFL Alumni Youth Football camps since 2013.
