= Isaac Hilton =

American football player (born 1981)

Isaac Hilton (born February 26, 1981, in Long Beach, California) is a former American football defensive end. He was drafted in the seventh round of the 2004 NFL draft out of Hampton University by the New York Giants, but was cut before the beginning of the season. He then played briefly for the Tampa Bay Buccaneers and the Carolina Panthers, and later played for the Arena Football League (AFL) and the Toronto Argonauts of the Canadian Football League (CFL). In 2009, while playing for the arenafootball2 Wilkes-Barre/Scranton Pioneers, Hilton was arrested and charged with possession of 70 bags of marijuana with the intent to distribute them.

2019 Isaac Hilton is an independent film producer along with his partner Felicia Rivers. They own Geechee One Films together.

At the 2004 NFL Scouting Combine, Hilton urinated on himself while being examined by scouts and coaches.
