= 2004 NFL season =

American football season

Regular season
- Duration: September 9, 2004 – January 2, 2005

Playoffs
- Start date: January 8, 2005
- AFC Champions: New England Patriots
- NFC Champions: Philadelphia Eagles

Super Bowl XXXIX
- Date: February 6, 2005
- Site: ALLTEL Stadium, Jacksonville, Florida
- Champions: New England Patriots

Pro Bowl
- Date: February 13, 2005
- Site: Aloha Stadium

AFC teams: West, North, South, East
NFC teams: West, North, South, East

The 2004 NFL season was the 85th regular season of the National Football League (NFL).

With the New England Patriots as the defending league champions, regular season play was held from September 9, 2004, to January 2, 2005. Hurricanes forced the rescheduling of two Miami Dolphins home games: the game against the Tennessee Titans was moved up one day to Saturday, September 11 to avoid oncoming Hurricane Ivan, while the game versus the Pittsburgh Steelers on Sunday, September 26 was moved back 7½ hours to miss the eye of Hurricane Jeanne.

The playoffs began on January 8, and eventually the New England Patriots repeated as NFL champions when they defeated the Philadelphia Eagles 24–21 in Super Bowl XXXIX at ALLTEL Stadium in Jacksonville, Florida on February 6. It would mark the last time a team won back-to-back Super Bowls until 2023 (that team being the Kansas City Chiefs).

== Transactions ==
- February 24, 2004, The Washington Redskins released Bruce Smith, the NFL's all-time sack leader, saving $6.5 million in salary cap space.

=== Draft ===
The 2004 NFL draft was held from April 24 to 25, 2004, at New York City's Theater at Madison Square Garden. With the first pick, the San Diego Chargers selected quarterback Eli Manning from the University of Mississippi.

== Referee changes ==
Ron Blum returned to line judge (where he officiated Super Bowl XXIV and Super Bowl XXVI), and Bill Vinovich was promoted to take his place as referee.

Midway through the season, Johnny Grier, the NFL's first African-American referee, suffered a leg injury that forced him to retire, and became an officiating supervisor for the NFL the following season. He was permanently replaced by the back judge on his crew, Scott Green, who had previous experience as a referee in NFL Europe.

== Rule changes ==
- Due to several incidents during the previous year, officials are authorized to penalize excessive celebration. The 15-yard unsportsmanlike conduct penalty will be marked off from the spot at the end of the previous play or, after a score, on the ensuing kickoff. If the infraction is ruled flagrant by the officials, the player(s) are ejected.
- Timeouts can be called by head coaches.
- The league's jersey numbering system was modified to allow wide receivers wear numbers 10–19, in addition to 80–89.
- A punt or missed field goal that is untouched by the receiving team is immediately dead once it touches either the end zone or any member of the kicking team in the end zone. Previously, a punt or missed field goal that lands in the end zone before being controlled by the kicking team could be picked up by a member of the receiving team and immediately run the other way.
- Teams will be awarded a third instant replay challenge if their first two are successful. Previously, teams were only limited to two regardless of what occurred during the game.
- The one-bar facemask was outlawed. The few remaining players who still used the one-bar facemask at the time were allowed to continue to use the style for the remainder of their career under a grandfather clause. (Scott Player was the last player to wear the one-bar facemask in 2007).

== 2004 deaths ==
- Pat Tillman former safety for the Arizona Cardinals was killed in a friendly fire incident during the war in Afghanistan.
- Reggie White former defensive end for the Green Bay Packers, Philadelphia Eagles, and Carolina Panthers unexpectedly died on December 26, 2004, just seven days after his 43rd birthday from complications of sleep apnea.

== Notable Retirements ==
- Ricky Williams
- Bruce Smith
- Keith Hamilton
- Ed McCaffrey
- Shannon Sharpe
- Bill Romanowski
- John Randle
- Rod Woodson
- Kevin Donnalley
- Joe Johnson
- Frank Wycheck
- Mo Lewis
- Larry Centers
- Frank Sanders
- Neil O'Donnell
- John Mobley
- Michael Bates
- Sam Garnes
- Adam Meadows
- Dave Szott
- John Jett
- Hunter Goodwin
- Lincoln Kennedy
- Steve Beuerlein
- Jimmy Spencer
- Darren Woodson
- Barret Robbins
- Jamie Nails
- Todd Perry
- Tim Ruddy
- Mark Dixon
- Alex Van Pelt
- Robert Porcher (after week 8)
- Darrell Russell
- Clyde Simmons

== Final regular season standings ==
AFC East
| | W | L | T | PCT | DIV | CONF | PF | PA | STK |
|---|---|---|---|---|---|---|---|---|---|
| ^{(2)} New England Patriots | 14 | 2 | 0 | .875 | 5–1 | 10–2 | 437 | 260 | W2 |
| ^{(5)} New York Jets | 10 | 6 | 0 | .625 | 3–3 | 7–5 | 333 | 261 | L2 |
| Buffalo Bills | 9 | 7 | 0 | .563 | 3–3 | 5–7 | 395 | 284 | L1 |
| Miami Dolphins | 4 | 12 | 0 | .250 | 1–5 | 2–10 | 275 | 354 | L1 |

AFC North
| | W | L | T | PCT | DIV | CONF | PF | PA | STK |
|---|---|---|---|---|---|---|---|---|---|
| ^{(1)} Pittsburgh Steelers | 15 | 1 | 0 | .938 | 5–1 | 11–1 | 372 | 251 | W14 |
| Baltimore Ravens | 9 | 7 | 0 | .563 | 3–3 | 6–6 | 317 | 268 | W1 |
| Cincinnati Bengals | 8 | 8 | 0 | .500 | 2–4 | 4–8 | 374 | 372 | W2 |
| Cleveland Browns | 4 | 12 | 0 | .250 | 2–4 | 3–9 | 276 | 390 | W1 |

AFC South
| | W | L | T | PCT | DIV | CONF | PF | PA | STK |
|---|---|---|---|---|---|---|---|---|---|
| ^{(3)} Indianapolis Colts | 12 | 4 | 0 | .750 | 5–1 | 8–4 | 522 | 351 | L1 |
| Jacksonville Jaguars | 9 | 7 | 0 | .563 | 2–4 | 6–6 | 261 | 280 | W1 |
| Houston Texans | 7 | 9 | 0 | .438 | 4–2 | 6–6 | 309 | 339 | L1 |
| Tennessee Titans | 5 | 11 | 0 | .313 | 1–5 | 3–9 | 344 | 439 | W1 |

AFC West
| | W | L | T | PCT | DIV | CONF | PF | PA | STK |
|---|---|---|---|---|---|---|---|---|---|
| ^{(4)} San Diego Chargers | 12 | 4 | 0 | .750 | 5–1 | 9–3 | 446 | 313 | W1 |
| ^{(6)} Denver Broncos | 10 | 6 | 0 | .625 | 3–3 | 7–5 | 381 | 304 | W2 |
| Kansas City Chiefs | 7 | 9 | 0 | .438 | 3–3 | 6–6 | 483 | 435 | L1 |
| Oakland Raiders | 5 | 11 | 0 | .313 | 1–5 | 3–9 | 320 | 442 | L2 |

NFC East
| | W | L | T | PCT | DIV | CONF | PF | PA | STK |
|---|---|---|---|---|---|---|---|---|---|
| ^{(1)} Philadelphia Eagles | 13 | 3 | 0 | .813 | 6–0 | 11–1 | 386 | 260 | L2 |
| New York Giants | 6 | 10 | 0 | .375 | 3–3 | 5–7 | 303 | 347 | W1 |
| Dallas Cowboys | 6 | 10 | 0 | .375 | 2–4 | 5–7 | 293 | 405 | L1 |
| Washington Redskins | 6 | 10 | 0 | .375 | 1–5 | 6–6 | 240 | 265 | W1 |

NFC North
| | W | L | T | PCT | DIV | CONF | PF | PA | STK |
|---|---|---|---|---|---|---|---|---|---|
| ^{(3)} Green Bay Packers | 10 | 6 | 0 | .625 | 5–1 | 9–3 | 424 | 380 | W2 |
| ^{(6)} Minnesota Vikings | 8 | 8 | 0 | .500 | 3–3 | 5–7 | 405 | 395 | L2 |
| Detroit Lions | 6 | 10 | 0 | .375 | 2–4 | 5–7 | 296 | 350 | L1 |
| Chicago Bears | 5 | 11 | 0 | .313 | 2–4 | 4–8 | 231 | 331 | L4 |

NFC South
| | W | L | T | PCT | DIV | CONF | PF | PA | STK |
|---|---|---|---|---|---|---|---|---|---|
| ^{(2)} Atlanta Falcons | 11 | 5 | 0 | .688 | 4–2 | 8–4 | 340 | 337 | L2 |
| New Orleans Saints | 8 | 8 | 0 | .500 | 3–3 | 6–6 | 348 | 405 | W4 |
| Carolina Panthers | 7 | 9 | 0 | .438 | 3–3 | 6–6 | 355 | 339 | L1 |
| Tampa Bay Buccaneers | 5 | 11 | 0 | .313 | 2–4 | 4–8 | 301 | 304 | L4 |

NFC West
| | W | L | T | PCT | DIV | CONF | PF | PA | STK |
|---|---|---|---|---|---|---|---|---|---|
| ^{(4)} Seattle Seahawks | 9 | 7 | 0 | .563 | 3–3 | 8–4 | 371 | 373 | W2 |
| ^{(5)} St. Louis Rams | 8 | 8 | 0 | .500 | 5–1 | 7–5 | 319 | 392 | W2 |
| Arizona Cardinals | 6 | 10 | 0 | .375 | 2–4 | 5–7 | 284 | 322 | W1 |
| San Francisco 49ers | 2 | 14 | 0 | .125 | 2–4 | 2–10 | 259 | 452 | L3 |

=== Conference standings ===
AFC
| # | Team | Division | W | L | T | PCT | DIV | CONF | SOS | SOV | STK |
|---|---|---|---|---|---|---|---|---|---|---|---|
Division leaders
| 1 | Pittsburgh Steelers | North | 15 | 1 | 0 | .938 | 5–1 | 11–1 | .484 | .479 | W14 |
| 2 | New England Patriots | East | 14 | 2 | 0 | .875 | 5–1 | 10–2 | .492 | .478 | W2 |
| 3 (Note: Indianapolis clinched the AFC #3 seed instead of San Diego based upon head-to-head victory.) | Indianapolis Colts | South | 12 | 4 | 0 | .750 | 5–1 | 8–4 | .500 | .458 | L1 |
| 4 | San Diego Chargers | West | 12 | 4 | 0 | .750 | 5–1 | 9–3 | .477 | .411 | W1 |
Wild cards
| 5 (Note: New York Jets clinched the AFC #5 seed instead of Denver based upon better record against common opponents (New York Jets were 5–0 to Denver’s 3–2 against San Diego, Cincinnati, Houston, and Miami).) | New York Jets | East | 10 | 6 | 0 | .625 | 3–3 | 7–5 | .523 | .406 | L2 |
| 6 | Denver Broncos | West | 10 | 6 | 0 | .625 | 3–3 | 7–5 | .484 | .450 | W2 |
Did not qualify for the postseason
| 7 (Note: Jacksonville and Baltimore finished ahead of Buffalo because they each defeated Buffalo head-to-head.) (Note: Jacksonville finished ahead of Baltimore based upon better record against common opponents (Jacksonville were 3–2 against Baltimore’s 2–3 versus Pittsburgh, Indianapolis, Buffalo and Kansas City).) | Jacksonville Jaguars | South | 9 | 7 | 0 | .563 | 2–4 | 6–6 | .527 | .479 | W1 |
| 8 | Baltimore Ravens | North | 9 | 7 | 0 | .563 | 3–3 | 6–6 | .551 | .472 | W1 |
| 9 | Buffalo Bills | East | 9 | 7 | 0 | .563 | 3–3 | 5–7 | .512 | .382 | L1 |
| 10 | Cincinnati Bengals | North | 8 | 8 | 0 | .500 | 2–4 | 4–8 | .543 | .453 | W2 |
| 11 (Note: Houston finished ahead of Kansas City based upon head-to-head victory.) | Houston Texans | South | 7 | 9 | 0 | .438 | 4–2 | 6–6 | .504 | .402 | L1 |
| 12 | Kansas City Chiefs | West | 7 | 9 | 0 | .438 | 3–3 | 6–6 | .551 | .509 | L1 |
| 13 (Note: Oakland finished ahead of Tennessee based upon head-to-head victory.) | Oakland Raiders | West | 5 | 11 | 0 | .313 | 1–5 | 3–9 | .570 | .450 | L2 |
| 14 | Tennessee Titans | South | 5 | 11 | 0 | .313 | 1–5 | 3–9 | .512 | .463 | W1 |
| 15 (Note: Miami finished ahead of Cleveland based upon head-to-head victory.) | Miami Dolphins | East | 4 | 12 | 0 | .250 | 1–5 | 2–10 | .555 | .438 | L1 |
| 16 | Cleveland Browns | North | 4 | 12 | 0 | .250 | 1–5 | 3–9 | .590 | .469 | W1 |
Tiebreakers (Note: When breaking ties for three or more teams under the NFL's rules, they are first broken within divisions, then comparing only the highest-ranked remaining team from each division.)

NFC
| # | Team | Division | W | L | T | PCT | DIV | CONF | SOS | SOV | STK |
|---|---|---|---|---|---|---|---|---|---|---|---|
Division leaders
| 1 | Philadelphia Eagles | East | 13 | 3 | 0 | .813 | 6–0 | 11–1 | .453 | .409 | L2 |
| 2 | Atlanta Falcons | South | 11 | 5 | 0 | .688 | 4–2 | 8–4 | .420 | .432 | L2 |
| 3 | Green Bay Packers | North | 10 | 6 | 0 | .625 | 5–1 | 9–3 | .457 | .419 | W2 |
| 4 | Seattle Seahawks | West | 9 | 7 | 0 | .563 | 3–3 | 8–4 | .445 | .368 | W2 |
Wild cards
| 5 (Note: St. Louis clinched the NFC #5 seed instead of Minnesota or New Orleans based on better conference record (7–5 to Minnesota’s 5–7 to New Orleans’ 6–6).) | St. Louis Rams | West | 8 | 8 | 0 | .500 | 5–1 | 7–5 | .488 | .438 | W2 |
| 6 (Note: Minnesota clinched the NFC #6 seed instead of New Orleans based on head-to-head victory.) | Minnesota Vikings | North | 8 | 8 | 0 | .500 | 3–3 | 5–7 | .480 | .406 | L2 |
Did not qualify for the postseason
| 7 | New Orleans Saints | South | 8 | 8 | 0 | .500 | 3–3 | 6–6 | .465 | .427 | W4 |
| 8 | Carolina Panthers | South | 7 | 9 | 0 | .438 | 3–3 | 6–6 | .496 | .366 | L1 |
| 9 (Note: Detroit finished ahead of Arizona and New York Giants based upon head-to-head record (2–0 versus Arizona’s 1–1 and New York Giants’ 0–2). Division tiebreak was initially used to eliminate Dallas and Washington.) | Detroit Lions | North | 6 | 10 | 0 | .375 | 2–4 | 5–7 | .496 | .417 | L2 |
| 10 | Arizona Cardinals | West | 6 | 10 | 0 | .375 | 2–4 | 5–7 | .461 | .417 | W1 |
| 11 (Note: New York Giants finished ahead of Dallas and Washington in the NFC East based on better head-to-head record (3–1 to Dallas‘ 2–2 to Washington’s 1–3).) | New York Giants | East | 6 | 10 | 0 | .375 | 3–3 | 5–7 | .516 | .417 | W1 |
| 12 (Note: Dallas finished ahead of Washington in the NFC East based on head-to-head sweep.) | Dallas Cowboys | East | 6 | 10 | 0 | .375 | 2–4 | 5–7 | .516 | .375 | L1 |
| 13 | Washington Redskins | East | 6 | 10 | 0 | .375 | 1–5 | 6–6 | .477 | .333 | W1 |
| 14 (Note: Tampa Bay finished ahead of Chicago based upon head-to-head victory.) | Tampa Bay Buccaneers | South | 5 | 11 | 0 | .313 | 2–4 | 4–8 | .477 | .413 | L4 |
| 15 | Chicago Bears | North | 5 | 11 | 0 | .313 | 2–4 | 4–8 | .465 | .388 | L4 |
| 16 | San Francisco 49ers | West | 2 | 14 | 0 | .125 | 2–4 | 2–10 | .488 | .375 | L3 |
Tiebreakers (Note: When breaking ties for three or more teams under the NFL's rules, they are first broken within divisions, then comparing only the highest-ranked remaining team from each division.)

== Playoffs ==
Within each conference, the four division winners and the top two non-division winners with the best overall regular season records) qualified for the playoffs. The four division winners are seeded 1–4 based on their overall won-lost-tied record, and the wild card teams are seeded 5–6. The NFL does not use a fixed bracket playoff system, and there are no restrictions regarding teams from the same division matching up in any round. In the first round, dubbed the wild-card playoffs or wild-card weekend, the third-seeded division winner hosts the sixth-seed wild card, and the fourth seed hosts the fifth. The 1 and 2 seeds from each conference received a first-round bye. In the second round, the divisional playoffs, the number 1 seed hosts the worst-surviving seed from the first round (seed 4, 5, or 6), while the number 2 seed will play the other team (seed 3, 4, or 5). The two surviving teams from each conference's divisional playoff games met in the respective AFC and NFC Conference Championship games, hosted by the higher seed. Although the Super Bowl, the championship round of the playoffs, is played at a neutral site, the designated home team is based on an annual rotation by conference.

Playoff seeds
| Seed | AFC | NFC |
|---|---|---|
| 1 | Pittsburgh Steelers (North winner) | Philadelphia Eagles (East winner) |
| 2 | New England Patriots (East winner) | Atlanta Falcons (South winner) |
| 3 | Indianapolis Colts (South winner) | Green Bay Packers (North winner) |
| 4 | San Diego Chargers (West winner) | Seattle Seahawks (West winner) |
| 5 | New York Jets (wild card) | St. Louis Rams (wild card) |
| 6 | Denver Broncos (wild card) | Minnesota Vikings (wild card) |

The Miami Dolphins were the first team to be eliminated from the playoff race, having reached a 1–9 record by week 11.

== Bracket ==
Jan 9 – RCA Dome | Jan 16 – Gillette Stadium
6 | Denver | 24
3 | Indianapolis | 3
3 | Indianapolis | 49 | Jan 23 – Heinz Field
2 | New England | 20
AFC
Jan 8 – Qualcomm Stadium | 2 | New England | 41
Jan 15 – Heinz Field
1 | Pittsburgh | 27
5 | NY Jets | 20* | AFC Championship
5 | NY Jets | 17
4 | San Diego | 17 | Feb 6 – Alltel Stadium
1 | Pittsburgh | 20*
Wild-card round
Divisional round
Jan 8 – Qwest Field | A2 | New England | 24
Jan 15 – Georgia Dome
N1 | Philadelphia | 21
5 | St. Louis | 27 | Super Bowl XXXIX
5 | St. Louis | 17
4 | Seattle | 20 | Jan 23 – Lincoln Financial Field
2 | Atlanta | 47
NFC
Jan 9 – Lambeau Field | 2 | Atlanta | 10
Jan 16 – Lincoln Financial Field
1 | Philadelphia | 27
6 | Minnesota | 31 | NFC Championship
6 | Minnesota | 14
3 | Green Bay | 17
1 | Philadelphia | 27

* Indicates OT victory

== Milestones ==
The following teams and players set all-time NFL records during the season:

| Record | Player/team | Date/opponent | Previous record holder |
|---|---|---|---|
| Longest interception return | Ed Reed, Baltimore (106 yards) | November 7, vs Cleveland | Tied by 2 players (103) |
| Most touchdown passes, season | Peyton Manning, Indianapolis (49) | N/A | Dan Marino, Miami, 1984 (48) |
| Highest passer rating, season | Peyton Manning, Indianapolis (121.1) | N/A | Steve Young, San Francisco, 1994 (112.8) |
| Most interception return yards gained, season | Ed Reed, Baltimore (358) | N/A | Charlie McNeil, San Diego, 1961 (349) |
| Most first downs by a team, season | Kansas City (398) | N/A | Miami, 1994 (387) |
| Most consecutive games won | New England (21) | October 24, vs. N.Y. Jets | Chicago, 1933–34 (17) |
| Most passing touchdowns by a team, season | Indianapolis (51) | N/A | Miami, 1984 (49) |

The Colts led the NFL with 522 points scored. The Colts tallied more points in the first half of each of their games of the 2004 NFL season (277 points) than seven other NFL teams managed in the entire season. Despite throwing for 49 touchdown passes, Peyton Manning attempted fewer than 500 passes for the first time in his NFL career. The San Francisco 49ers' record 420 consecutive scoring games that had started in Week 5 of the 1977 season ended in Week 3 of the season.

== Statistical leaders ==
=== Team ===
| Points scored | Indianapolis Colts (522) |
| Total yards gained | Kansas City Chiefs (6,695) |
| Yards rushing | Atlanta Falcons (2,672) |
| Yards passing | Indianapolis Colts (4,623) |
| Fewest points allowed | Pittsburgh Steelers (251) |
| Fewest total yards allowed | Pittsburgh Steelers (4,134) |
| Fewest rushing yards allowed | Pittsburgh Steelers (1,299) |
| Fewest passing yards allowed | Tampa Bay Buccaneers (2,579) |

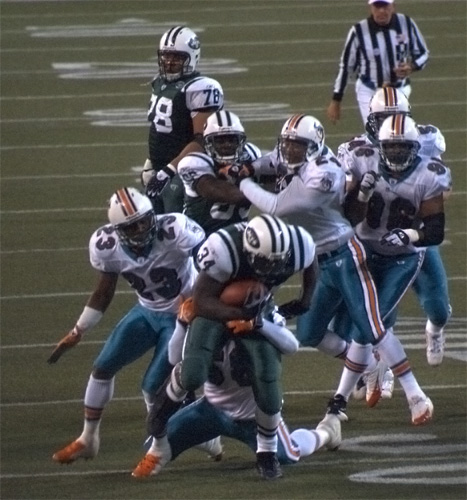
Playoff chasers the New York Jets against Miami in 2004, week 8 MNF

=== Individual ===
| Scoring | Adam Vinatieri, New England (141 points) |
| Touchdowns | Shaun Alexander, Seattle (20 TDs) |
| Most field goals made | Adam Vinatieri, New England (31 FGs) |
| Passing | Daunte Culpepper, Minnesota (4717 yards) |
| Passing Touchdowns | Peyton Manning, Indianapolis (49 TDs) |
| Passer Rating | Peyton Manning, Indianapolis (121.1 rating) |
| Rushing | Curtis Martin, New York Jets (1,697 yards) |
| Rushing Touchdowns | LaDainian Tomlinson, San Diego (17 TDs) |
| Receptions | Tony Gonzalez, Kansas City (102) |
| Receiving yards | Muhsin Muhammad, Carolina (1,405) |
| Punt returns | Eddie Drummond, Detroit (13.2 average yards) |
| Kickoff returns | Willie Ponder, New York Giants (26.9 average yards) |
| Interceptions | Ed Reed, Baltimore (9) |
| Punting | Shane Lechler, Oakland (46.7 average yards) |
| Sacks | Dwight Freeney, Indianapolis (16) |

== Awards ==
| Most Valuable Player | Peyton Manning, quarterback, Indianapolis |
| Coach of the Year | Marty Schottenheimer, San Diego |
| Offensive Player of the Year | Peyton Manning, quarterback, Indianapolis |
| Defensive Player of the Year | Ed Reed, Strong Safety, Baltimore |
| Offensive Rookie of the Year | Ben Roethlisberger, quarterback, Pittsburgh |
| Defensive Rookie of the Year | Jonathan Vilma, linebacker, New York Jets |
| NFL Comeback Player of the Year | Drew Brees, quarterback, San Diego |
| Walter Payton NFL Man of the Year | Warrick Dunn, running back, Atlanta |
| Super Bowl Most Valuable Player | Deion Branch, wide receiver, New England |

== Head coach/front office changes ==
Head coach

| Team | Departing coach | Interim coach | Incoming coach | Reason for leaving | Notes |
|---|---|---|---|---|---|
| Arizona Cardinals | Dave McGinnis | | Dennis Green | Fired | After spending two seasons as an analyst for ESPN, Green was hired as head coach by the Arizona Cardinals on January 7, 2004. |
| Atlanta Falcons | Dan Reeves | Wade Phillips | Jim L. Mora | Fired | Reeves was fired after winning just three of the first thirteen games of the 2003 season, with defensive coordinator Wade Phillips serving as interim coach for the last three games. Mora was previously the 49ers' defensive coordinator from 1999 until 2003. |
| Buffalo Bills | Gregg Williams | | Mike Mularkey | Fired | After three seasons in which the team compiled records of 3–13, 8–8, and 6–10 under his leadership, Williams' contract was allowed to expire after the 2003 season. Mularkey served as the Steelers offensive coordinator for the past three seasons. |
| Chicago Bears | Dick Jauron | | Lovie Smith | Fired | Jauron coached the Bears for five seasons (1999–2003), finishing with a 35–45 regular season record and one playoff appearance. Smith was the defensive coordinator of the St. Louis Rams for three seasons under head coach Mike Martz. While in St. Louis, Smith improved the Rams' defense from giving up a league-worst 29.4 points per game in 2000, to an average of 17.1 points per game in 2001. Upon arriving in Chicago, Smith stated he had three goals: beat the Green Bay Packers, win the NFC North, and win a Super Bowl. |
| New York Giants | Jim Fassel | | Tom Coughlin | Fired | On December 17, 2003, with two games remaining in what became a 4-12 season and knowing that the team was near certain to let him go at its conclusion, Fassel announced he would resign after the season. After being out of football in 2003, former Jacksonville Jaguars head coach Tom Coughlin was hired to replace Fassel as head coach of the Giants in January 2004. |
| Oakland Raiders | Bill Callahan | | Norv Turner | Fired | Callahan was fired by Raiders owner Al Davis on January 1, 2004, after a lackluster 4–12 season. Turner was offensive coordinator for the Miami Dolphins in 2002 and 2003. |
| Washington Redskins | Steve Spurrier | | Joe Gibbs | Resigned | Spurrier resigned on December 30, 2003, choosing to walk away from $15 million still owed to him over the remaining three years of his contract. In January 2004, Gibbs accepted an offer from Redskins owner Daniel Snyder to return to the team. In the eleven years since Gibbs retired as the Redskins head coach, many NFL owners had approached Gibbs hoping to lure him out of his retirement of managing his NASCAR racing team, but to no avail. At his press conference, Gibbs stated that even though he enjoyed NASCAR, he had also missed coaching in the NFL. Gibbs left his racing team in the hands of his eldest son, J. D., while his other son, Coy, joined him as an assistant with the Redskins. |

Front office

| Team | Departing executive | Incoming executive | Reason for leaving | Notes |
|---|---|---|---|---|
| Atlanta Falcons | Dan Reeves | Rich McKay | Fired | On December 12, 2003, McKay and the Buccaneers came to an agreement that would see McKay leave the organization with the freedom to join any team he wanted with no compensation required. On December 15, 2003, McKay became president and general manager of the Falcons. |
| Miami Dolphins | Eddie Jones | Rick Spielman | Retired | Spielman was promoted from senior vice president of football operations after the 2003 season to replace the retiring Jones. |
| Tampa Bay Buccaneers | Rich McKay | Bruce Allen | Mutual agreement | Following the 2003 season, the Tampa Bay Buccaneers gave McKay permission to leave the team as his relationship with Super Bowl XXXVII-winning coach Jon Gruden had deteriorated. The Glazer family hired Raiders senior executive Bruce Allen to replace McKay, as Allen had previously worked with Gruden in Oakland. |

== Stadium changes ==
- Carolina Panthers: Ericsson Stadium was renamed Bank of America Stadium after Bank of America acquired the naming rights.
- Minnesota Vikings: The AstroTurf at the Metrodome was replaced with a new FieldTurf field.
- Oakland Raiders: Network Associates Coliseum was renamed McAfee Coliseum to reflect naming right holder, Network Associates, changing its name to McAfee.
- San Francisco 49ers: Monster Cable acquired the naming rights to Candlestick Park, renaming it merely to "Monster Park" without any qualifier. This eventually results in confusion among fans who erroneously think the name instead refers to Monster.com or Monster Energy.
- Seattle Seahawks: Seahawks Stadium was renamed Qwest Field after telecommunications carrier Qwest acquired the naming rights.

== New uniforms ==
- The Atlanta Falcons switched the primary and alternate jerseys, making the red ones the primary and the black ones the alternate.
- The Baltimore Ravens added black third alternative uniforms.
- The Cincinnati Bengals introduced new uniforms, featuring black jerseys with orange tiger-striped sleeves, white jerseys with black tiger striped sleeves, and orange third alternate uniforms. A new logo featuring an orange "B" with black tiger stripes was also unveiled.
- The Chicago Bears added orange third alternate uniforms.
- The Indianapolis Colts switched from blue face masks and white shoes to gray facemasks and black shoes
- The Jacksonville Jaguars made modification to their white uniforms, changing the teal number with black and gold trim to black numbers with gold and teal trim. Also introduced were new black pants with the Jaguars logo on hip.
- The New York Giants added red third alternate uniforms.
- The San Diego Chargers returned to navy pants with their white jerseys.

== Television ==
This was the seventh year under the league's eight-year broadcast contracts with ABC, CBS, Fox, and ESPN to televise Monday Night Football, the AFC package, the NFC package, and Sunday Night Football, respectively.

At CBS, Jim Nantz and Greg Gumbel swapped roles. Nantz replaced Gumbel as CBS's lead play-by-play announcer while Gumbel took Nantz's hosting duties on The NFL Today. Shannon Sharpe also joined The NFL Today as an analyst, replacing Deion Sanders who was let go due to salary disputes, and returned to playing with the Baltimore Ravens from 2004-2005. Former quarterback Steve Beuerlein joined CBS as a color commentator following his retirement after the 2003 NFL season and worked the #7 broadcast team. As well as Dan Dierdorf doing play by play for the first time since the 1980’s for the Titans Dolphins matchup week 1 with Todd Blackledge as the game was moved to Saturday due to Hurricane Ivan.

ESPN play-by-play announcer Mike Patrick missed the first few broadcasts to recover from heart bypass surgery. Pat Summerall filled in those weeks for Patrick.

Starting this season CBS, Fox, ABC, and ESPN started broadcasting regular season games in High Definition. CBS would do select games weekly, while Fox, ABC, and ESPN broadcast every game weekly.
