= 2018 NFC Championship Game =

NFL conference title game featuring an officiating controversy

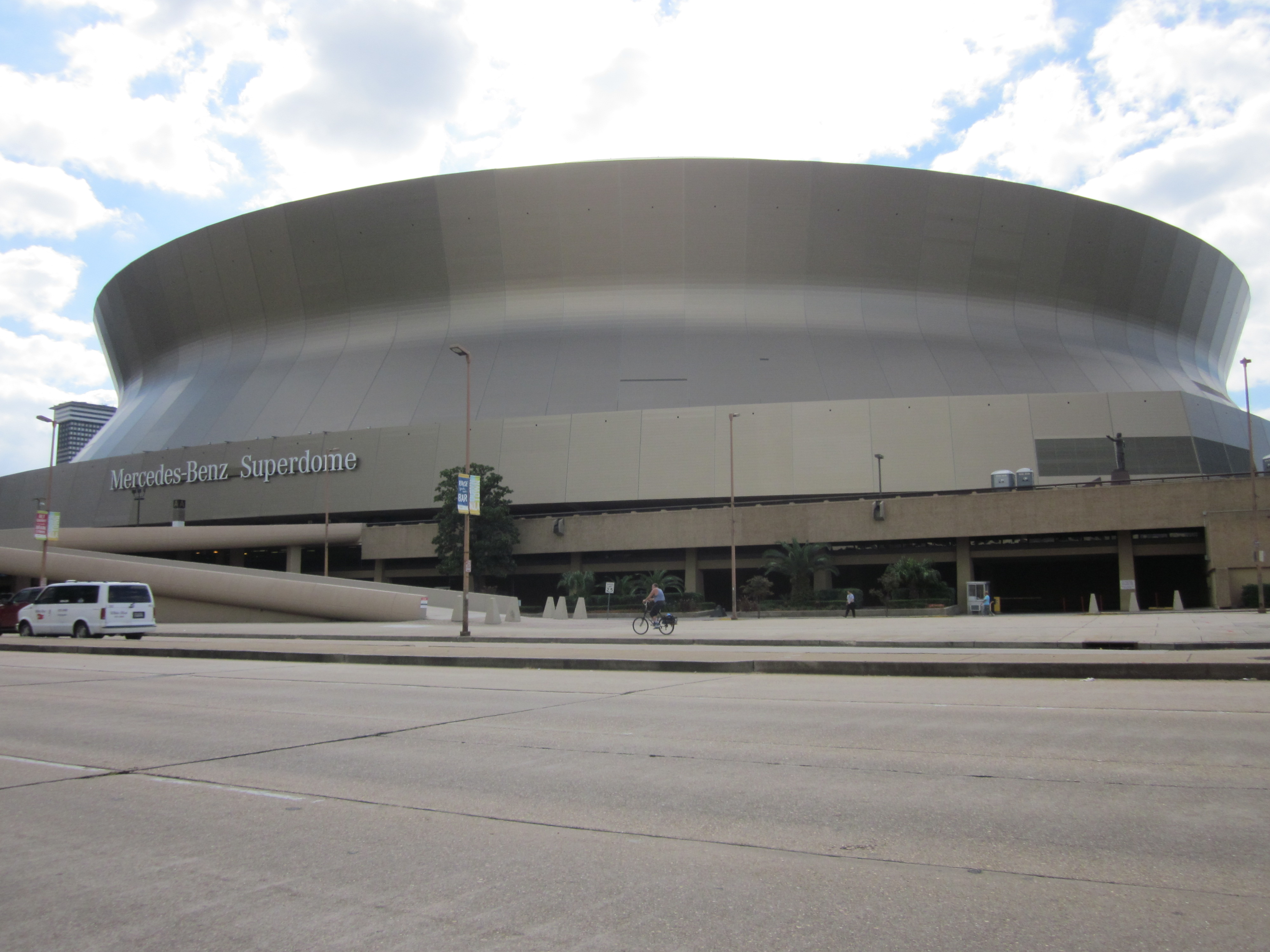
- The Mercedes-Benz Superdome in New Orleans, the site of the game
| Los Angeles Rams (2) (13–3) | New Orleans Saints (1) (13–3) |
|---|---|
| 26 | 23 |
| Head coach: Sean McVay | Head coach: Sean Payton |
| | 1 | 2 | 3 | 4 | OT | Total |
|---|---|---|---|---|---|---|
| LAR | 0 | 10 | 7 | 6 | 3 | 26 |
| NO | 13 | 0 | 7 | 3 | 0 | 23 |
- Date: January 20, 2019
- Stadium: Mercedes-Benz Superdome; New Orleans, Louisiana
- Favorite: Saints by 3
- Referee: Bill Vinovich (52)
- Attendance: 73,028

TV in the United States
- Network: Fox
- Announcers: Joe Buck, Troy Aikman, Erin Andrews, and Chris Myers
- Nielsen ratings: 27.1 (national)
- Market share: 49 (national)

The 2018 National Football Conference (NFC) Championship Game was a National Football League (NFL) game played on January 20, 2019, to determine the NFC champion for the 2018 NFL season. The visiting Los Angeles Rams defeated the New Orleans Saints 26–23 in sudden death overtime to advance to Super Bowl LIII. The outcome, however, was mired in controversy because of a unpenalized pass interference committed by Rams cornerback Nickell Robey-Coleman on Saints wide receiver Tommylee Lewis near the end of regulation, which would be nicknamed the "NOLA No-Call".

The Saints entered the game slightly favored to win, due to being the NFC's top seed, having home field advantage at the Mercedes-Benz Superdome, and previously defeating the Rams in the regular season. Both finished the regular season with a 13–3 record, with the Saints owning the head-to-head tiebreaker from their prior win over the Rams. In a tight contest that was tied at 20 in the fourth quarter, the Saints reached the Rams' 13-yard line with less than two minutes remaining, but the uncalled pass interference caused their drive to stall. Had the penalty been called, the Saints could have run out the clock further and/or scored a go-ahead touchdown to virtually seal their victory. Instead, the Saints settled for a field goal with 1:41 remaining, which the Rams matched on their next possession to force overtime. The Saints took possession first in overtime from winning the coin toss, but an interception from Saints quarterback Drew Brees led to Rams kicker Greg Zuerlein scoring the winning field goal.

The no-call was met with intense backlash, particularly in New Orleans, where Saints fans attempted to have the game replayed and boycotted the Super Bowl. Although both the NFL and Robey-Coleman admitted a penalty should have been called, league commissioner Roger Goodell determined that the no-call was an act of human error by the referees and not enough to reverse the game's outcome. Following the controversy, the NFL instituted a new rule for the 2019 season that would allow coaches to challenge pass interference calls, but reverted the rule the season afterwards.

== Background ==
The Rams were in just their third season back in Southern California after having left Los Angeles after the 1994 season and spending 21 seasons in St. Louis, Missouri. Ahead of the 2016 season, their first back in Los Angeles, the Rams had the first pick of the 2016 NFL Draft and used it on quarterback Jared Goff. Under head coach Jeff Fisher, the Rams lost 11 of their last 12 games in 2016 (with Goff losing the last seven) resulting in Fisher's firing and the hiring of then 30-year old Sean McVay in the offseason, making him the youngest ever NFL coach in the modern era. Under McVay, the Rams experienced a complete turnaround in 2017, finishing 11–5, winning the NFC West for the first time since 2003 and reaching the playoffs for the first time since 2004, with significantly better play from Goff and running back Todd Gurley. In the playoffs, however, they were eliminated at home in the wild card round by the Atlanta Falcons.

The Saints, meanwhile, had more experience at the head coaching and quarterback positions, with 11-time Pro-Bowler Drew Brees in his 13th season as starting quarterback for New Orleans and Sean Payton in his 12th season as head coach. The pair had won a Super Bowl in 2009 (the franchise's first), and had reached the playoffs six times entering the 2018 season, but had not reached the NFC Championship game since winning the Super Bowl. In 2017, the Saints also finished 11–5 and defeated their divisional rival Carolina Panthers in the Wild Card Round before falling to the Minnesota Vikings in the Divisional Round after the Vikings scored a last-second touchdown that would become known as the Minneapolis Miracle. For the 2018 season, this was seen as the last and best chance for the Saints to reach the Super Bowl with Brees and Payton, since Brees would turn 41 by the next Super Bowl and quarterbacks' performances tended to drop at that age.

The 2018 regular season saw both the Saints and the Rams improve upon their 11–5 records to both go 13–3 and their respective divisions for the second year in a row. The Saints and Rams respectively secured the 1 and 2 seeds, ensuring they would get a first-round bye to the NFC Divisional Round. The Rams and Saints met in Week 9, the Rams having started the season an unblemished 8–0 while the Saints began the year 7–1. The Saints pulled out to an 18-point lead by halftime, with Michael Thomas managing 211 receiving yards during the game. The Rams fought hard but Jared Goff soon found himself unable to convert on back to back drives with one critical interception during the third quarter. Infamously during a critical play in the fourth quarter; Michael Thomas imitated Joe Horn's notorious cellphone celebration upon scoring a 72-yard touchdown in a simultaneous effort to taunt the Rams, as New Orleans had ultimately secured the lead and ended the Rams' win streak. The celebration led to Thomas being fined $30,000 for excessive celebration and multiple Rams players expressed their anger with Thomas' on-field antics during the loss. After the game, Sean Payton admitted that he felt good about Rams' cornerback Marcus Peters covering Thomas, saying he "liked that matchup—a lot." Peters responded by telling interviewers:

"Tell Sean Payton to keep talking that shit...We're going to see him soon, you feel me? Because I like what he was saying on the sidelines, too. So tell him to keep talking that shit, and I hope you see me soon. We're going to have a nice little bowl of gumbo together."

With the 45–35 win, the Saints gained the tie-breaker over the Rams with both teams at 8–1 after the game. The Saints lost control of the NFC's top playoff seed after a Week 13 loss at the Cowboys, but regained it for good following the Rams' back to back losses at the Bears in Week 14 and at home against the Eagles in a Week 15 upset. The Rams secured the second seed, one game ahead of the Bears.

In the Divisional Round, the Saints played the sixth-seeded and defending Super Bowl champion Philadelphia Eagles. Although they fell behind 14–0 in the first quarter after Eagles quarterback Nick Foles scored two touchdowns, the Saints scored 20 unanswered points to win the game, with cornerback Marshon Lattimore intercepting Nick Foles in Saints territory on the Eagles' final drive. It was the Saints' first NFC Championship Game appearance since the 2009 season, when the Saints defeated the Minnesota Vikings en route to winning Super Bowl XLIV. The Rams played the fourth-seeded Dallas Cowboys and defeated them by a score of 30–22 as running backs C. J. Anderson and Todd Gurley each rushed for over 100 yards and combined for three touchdowns. It was the Rams' first NFC Championship Game appearance since the 2001 season, when they were based in St. Louis and defeated the Philadelphia Eagles to advance to Super Bowl XXXVI. It was their NFC Championship Game appearance while based in Los Angeles since the 1989 season, when they lost to the eventual Super Bowl champion San Francisco 49ers.

This was the first postseason matchup between the Rams and Saints since the 2000 Wild Card round in which the Saints upset the then-defending champion St. Louis Rams for the victory, back when both teams were division rivals in the NFC West.

The head referee of the game was Bill Vinovich; the Rams had lost the previous eight times when he served as head referee of a game in which they played. Before the game, some Rams fans began an unsuccessful petition to have him replaced with a different referee.

== Game summary ==
The Saints received ball to start the game, and drove 56 yards before a 37-yard Wil Lutz field goal gave them an opening 3–0 lead. On the ensuing drive, Rams quarterback Jared Goff's check-down pass went through the hands of running back Todd Gurley and was intercepted by Saints linebacker Demario Davis at Los Angeles' 17 yard line. However, New Orleans was unable to convert a first down with the great field position, and settled for another field goal to make the score 6–0. The Rams followed with a three-and-out and were forced to punt. This time, the Saints marched 63 yards in eight plays, culminating in a five-yard touchdown pass from Drew Brees to Garrett Griffin immediately following the Saints' drawing the Rams offsides on fourth down to extend the drive. The score gave New Orleans a 13–0 lead with 1:35 to play in the first quarter. In the early stages of the game, the noise in the Superdome appeared to be affecting Jared Goff's ability to hear play calls, so the Rams' covered the ear holes in Goff's helmet with tape to drown out some of the crowd noise.

Five plays into the Rams' ensuing drive, they were forced into another fourth down in their own territory and lined up to punt again, but this time executed a fake punt, with punter Johnny Hekker receiving the long snap and throwing outside to gunner Sam Shields, who evaded a defender to gain a first down. The Rams were able to continue the drive into Saints territory, with kicker Greg Zuerlein converting a 36-yard field goal to make the score 13–3 midway through the second quarter. After two punts by the Saints and one by the Rams, Goff completed four of six passes for 75 yards on the ensuing drive to set up a 6-yard Todd Gurley touchdown run, trimming the lead to 13–10 just before halftime.

The Rams opened the second half with a punt. The Saints then used several short Brees completions on an 81-yard touchdown drive, capped off by Brees' two-yard screen pass to Taysom Hill to stretch the lead to 10 points again. Los Angeles immediately responded with its own 75-yard touchdown drive, with Goff's one-yard completion to Tyler Higbee on third and goal making the score 20–17 in favor of the Saints with just over three minutes remaining in the third quarter. The next three possessions all resulted in punts, with the Rams receiving the ball on their own nine-yard line with just under 11 minutes remaining in the game.

Trailing by three points, the Rams converted a third-and-three from their own 16 with a 39-yard completion from Goff to Gerald Everett. Two plays later, Goff completed a 33-yard pass to Josh Reynolds, bringing the Rams' to New Orleans' seven-yard line. On second-and-goal from the five, Jared Goff scrambled towards the goal line and had his face mask grabbed and turned by Saints linebacker A.J. Klein before going down at the two-yard line, but a face mask foul was not called. Had a foul been called for grasping of the face mask and a penalty assessed, the Rams would have had first-and-goal on the Saints' one-yard line with a great opportunity to potentially take a 24–20 lead. Instead, on third-and-goal from the two-yard line, running back C.J. Anderson was ruled to have been stopped just short of the goal line. On fourth down, Los Angeles elected to kick a field goal to tie the game at 20 with 5:03 remaining.

New Orleans returned the following kickoff to its own-30 yard line. On the third play of the drive, Brees converted a third down with a check-down pass to Alvin Kamara. Then, two plays later, he completed a 43-yard pass to a leaping Ted Ginn Jr. at the Rams' 13-yard line right at the two-minute warning. A Kamara run for no gain followed by an incompletion set up third and 10 with 1:49 remaining, with the score tied 20–20.

=== Controversial play ===
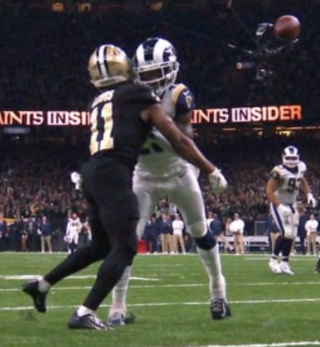
Rams cornerback Nickell Robey-Coleman (white jersey) commits the illegal hit on Saints receiver Tommylee Lewis that was uncalled by the officials

On the third down play, the Saints lined up in shotgun formation, with receiver Tommylee Lewis lined up in the backfield to Brees' right. Just prior to the snap, there appeared to be a bit of confusion in the Rams' secondary, with cornerback Nickell Robey-Coleman lined up on the opposite side of the formation from Lewis, who ended up being his receiver assignment. Upon the snap, Lewis ran a wheel route towards the right sideline, and Brees threw a pass intended for him. Before Lewis could play the ball, Robey-Coleman, who was sprinting to make the play from being out of position, delivered a blind-side hit to Lewis near the 6-yard line, without turning to play the ball (which had not yet arrived), forcefully knocking Lewis to the ground. However, no flag was thrown for what was an apparent pass interference foul. (see Rules 8.5.2(a),(e)) Three officials appeared to have a clear view of the play: down judge Patrick Turner and side judge Gary Cavaletto, who were stationed 25 yards apart on the right sideline in front of the Saints bench, and back judge Todd Prukop, who was positioned in the middle of the field. Joe Buck and Troy Aikman, the announcers on the Fox broadcast, had the following commentary:

Buck: "Quick snap, Brees. Pass is...incomplete, no flag for Tommylee Lewis. Nickell Robey-Coleman delivered a hit, and the two officials talk to each other...crowd's going crazy as there's no flag right on the Saints sideline".
Aikman: "Well, if Nickell Robey-Coleman plays the ball, it's an interception! He's probably going the other way with it. I mean the ball's on the other side of Robey-Coleman and...but that should have been a penalty, and Sean Payton is justifiably upset".

Later, viewers pointed out that in addition to pass interference, the play may have also constituted a hit to the head or neck area of a defenseless receiver, also a foul carrying an automatic first down. (see: Rule 12.2.9(b)) Had either foul been called and the penalty yardage assessed, the Saints would have been granted a first down on the Rams' six yard line with 1:45 left in the game. With the first down, they would likely have executed a series of low-risk running or kneel-down plays to run the clock; with the Rams having one timeout remaining, the Saints would have been able to run the clock to under 20 seconds before attempting a short field goal. This would have left the Rams with under 20 seconds and no timeouts to drive into field goal-range for an unlikely but potential game-tying field goal attempt. According to ESPN, the Saints' win probability was calculated at 98% if pass interference had been called. After the non-call, their win probability dropped to 78%.

Saints head coach Sean Payton was enraged and appealed to the officials for a call, but to no avail. Immediately after the play, Robey-Coleman can be seen on the television broadcast looking side-to-side, likely anticipating a penalty flag. He stated after the game that he got away with a penalty, telling reporters, "Hell yeah, that was a PI. I did my part. Referee made the call. We respect it." Robey-Coleman was also reported as stating that he was intentionally committing a penalty to prevent a touchdown. Lewis, too, was looking for a flag. After the game, he stated "I got up looking for a flag and didn't see one. It was a bad call."

=== Remainder of fourth quarter and overtime ===
With the Saints now facing 4th down and 10 yards to go and unable to run the clock down further, Will Lutz made a 31-yard field goal to take the lead 23–20 with 1:41 remaining. The time saved from the non-call allowed the Rams to put together a quick nine-play drive, including a third-down conversion, with Zuerlein ultimately making a 48-yard field goal with 15 seconds left in regulation to tie the score at 23. The Saints elected to kneel the ball and send the game into overtime.

The Saints won the overtime coin toss and elected to receive the opening kickoff. On the second play of overtime, tight end Dan Arnold did manage to draw a 15-yard pass interference penalty to move the ball to the Saints' 40-yard line. After a six-yard loss on a Mark Ingram run, Brees attempted to target Michael Thomas on second down and 16 but was hit in the face as he released the ball, resulting in an interception by the Rams' John Johnson at the Rams' 46-yard line. Goff completed a 12-yard pass to Higbee on the first play of the ensuing drive, but a near-fumble on the handoff to C.J. Anderson lost three yards on first down. On second and 13 from the Saints' 45, Goff narrowly avoided a sack to find Higbee again for a crucial six-yard gain to the Saints' 39-yard line. Two plays later, Greg Zuerlein kicked a 57-yard game-winning field goal, sending the Rams to the Super Bowl.

=== Media coverage ===
The game received a 27.1 rating and a market share of 49 for television viewing in the US.

== Consequences of the play ==
=== Reactions to the play ===
Saints head coach Sean Payton, who reacted demonstrably to the non-call on the sideline during the game, received a phone call he held directly after the game with the NFL's Senior VP of Officiating, Al Riveron, who admitted the officials had missed the call. He referenced this in his postgame remarks:

"Disappointing way to lose a game...frustrating, you know. Just getting off the phone with the league office. They blew the call. We had a lot of opportunities though, but that call puts it first and ten, we only need three plays, it's a game changing call. That's where it's at".

Five days after the game, the NFL fined Robey-Coleman $26,739 for the play. The fine was an admission the play should have been called a personal foul for an illegal hit on a defenseless receiver. Payton and Saints players, including Brees, receiver Michael Thomas, and tight end Benjamin Watson, grew restless as Goodell was slow to reach out to players who felt like they were owed an explanation, or at least an admission that they had been wronged. Eleven days after the game, Thomas tweeted "He ain't talk to us". The next day, Brees was interviewed on The Dan Patrick Show:

"Do I really want to be in a position talking about this over and over again? No, but I have to stand up and do it because I have to represent my team, represent the Who Dat Nation, and that's my responsibility. It's the commissioner's responsibility to do the same thing, and yet we don't hear a peep for 10 days, and it's because he has to do it now because he's at the Super Bowl and he does his annual press conference".

Thomas was particularly vocal about the loss, expressing his anger at both the officials, and the Rams during his post game interview. Thomas later claimed he sought revenge on the Rams for their upcoming matchup during the 2019 season, boldly claiming the Saints would return to the NFC Championship the following season as well:

"This has been a good city, they always came back from adversity; it's just about the moment, and we couldn't control it, that's the hard part. As far as next year? we're gonna come back, and we're gonna come back with revenge for sure. I saw exactly what you saw, that was pass interference."

Several Rams players and coaches acknowledged the lack of a pass interference call in the lead-up to the Super Bowl, but also referenced other incorrect calls in the game that favored the Saints, particularly the face mask call on Jared Goff near the Saints' goal line. Similar to the pass interference no-call, ruling of a foul on that play could have significantly affected subsequent strategy in the game. Had New Orleans been penalized for grasping Goff's face mask, the Rams would have had a first down and goal-to-go on the New Orleans one-yard line with just over five minutes remaining in the game. The Rams would have had a high likelihood of scoring a touchdown over the next three or four downs, which would have given them a 24–20 lead. Even if the subsequent events transpired in exactly the same way, the Saints would have needed to score a touchdown and could not have simply run down the clock for a field goal like they could have if it was tied. Rams veteran offensive lineman Andrew Whitworth referenced this while speaking on The Rich Eisen Show:

"You see the arguments from some of the Saints' players about the rule about the commissioner restarting the game over or from that point or whatever. My argument to that would be, Rich, is then Jared Goff got a facemask on the second down on the possession before that was not called. That'd be first-and-goal at the 1 down three points. If you look at our odds from the 1 [yard line] this season, that's seven points. So, they'd be down four, and a field goal wouldn't matter. They would have had to score in that situation either way...So, the reality is, where is the last foul that you want to argue? Whether it's blatant or not is not a matter. It's whether it's a foul."

Rams head coach Sean McVay acknowledged the Robey-Coleman no-call while also referencing the missed face mask foul on Goff:

“I’m not going to sit here and say there clearly wasn’t a little bit of contact before that ball actually arrived. But whether he catches it or not, there’s a lot of things that go into that. ... I feel bad for when it occurred in the framework of the game, but I thought Sean [Payton] said it best: There’s a lot of other opportunities, and there’s a lot of things that do dictate and determine the outcome of the game...When you slow it down, clearly you can see some of the things that took place. If you want to do that on every single play, though, there’s a lot of instances. You want to slow some things down with a face mask on Goff, some different things. What we try to do a good job of understanding is that it is an imperfect game.”

In Goodell's annual Super Bowl interview on January 30, he admitted that officials were "human," but they had missed that call. While his answer did little to quell players' frustrations, it certainly did nothing for Saints fans, who effectively boycotted the Super Bowl. The game received a 26.1 television rating in New Orleans, the lowest of any market and by far the lowest ever in New Orleans. The general ratings were also the lowest in a decade, with average viewership at about 98 million and total viewership reported as 149 million.

=== Legal action ===
A group of Saints fans and season ticket holders upset with the controversial non-call and the subsequent outcome of the game filed a lawsuit against the NFL on January 27, 2019. The lawsuit, filed by Tommy Badeaux and Candis Lambert "individually and on behalf of New Orleans Saints Season Ticket Holders, New Orleans Saints National Fan Base a/k/a The Who Dat Nation and any party with interest that has been affected by the outcome," named Roger Goodell and the NFL as defendants. The lawsuit asked the Louisiana Court "to mandate the extraordinary step of ordering a replay of the NFC Championship Game, and for damages to all putative class member Saints fans. The consequences of ordering a replay of the NFC Championship Game or any portion of the game cannot be overstated". Such an order would have been the first in history. The next day, the NFL publicly acknowledged the missed call for the first time. In the same press release, they asked that the lawsuit be thrown out on the grounds that "this kind of dispute implicates no legally cognizable rights". The court denied the plaintiffs request to replay the game days later. There was also petition on Change.org made requesting that Goodell declare a rematch between the Rams and the Saints on January 27, the Sunday before the Super Bowl. A total of 760,512 people signed the petition, but no such action was taken.

The day after the game, Saints owner Gayle Benson released a statement announcing that she was "aggressively" pursuing for the NFL to make policy changes "to ensure no team and fan base is ever put in a similar position again." Notable Louisiana politicians came out in support of Benson, including New Orleans mayor LaToya Cantrell. On January 23, U.S. Representative Cedric Richmond called for Roger Goodell to be invited to testify before the House Judiciary Committee's Subcommittee on the Administrative State, Regulatory Reform, and Antitrust in regards to the result of the game. These calls were echoed by U.S. Senator Bill Cassidy when he delivered a speech before the Senate floor on January 25.

=== Rule change ===
On January 30, 2019, reports began to surface that the NFL was considering a rule change. Goodell said during his Super Bowl interview that the league would re-examine replay rules, specifically those excluding judgment calls from being reviewable. Further reports indicated that the NFL is considering adopting a rule that would allow a limited basis for coaches to challenge judgment calls, or whether or not a penalty had been called. The rule would include a consequence should the call be upheld.

In March 2019, the NFL proposed a rule for a one-year replay expansion trial. Under the proposed rule, penalties and pass interference calls would be reviewable. On March 27, 2019, NFL owners approved a trial rule change that would allow coaches to challenge pass interference call on both the offense and the defense. The measure was approved by vote of 31–1, with the Cincinnati Bengals being the only team vote against it. During the 2019 season, the NFL reviewed 101 pass interference calls and non-calls but only overturned 24. The largely criticized rule change was reverted prior to the 2020 season.

== Aftermath ==
=== Rams' Super Bowl appearance ===
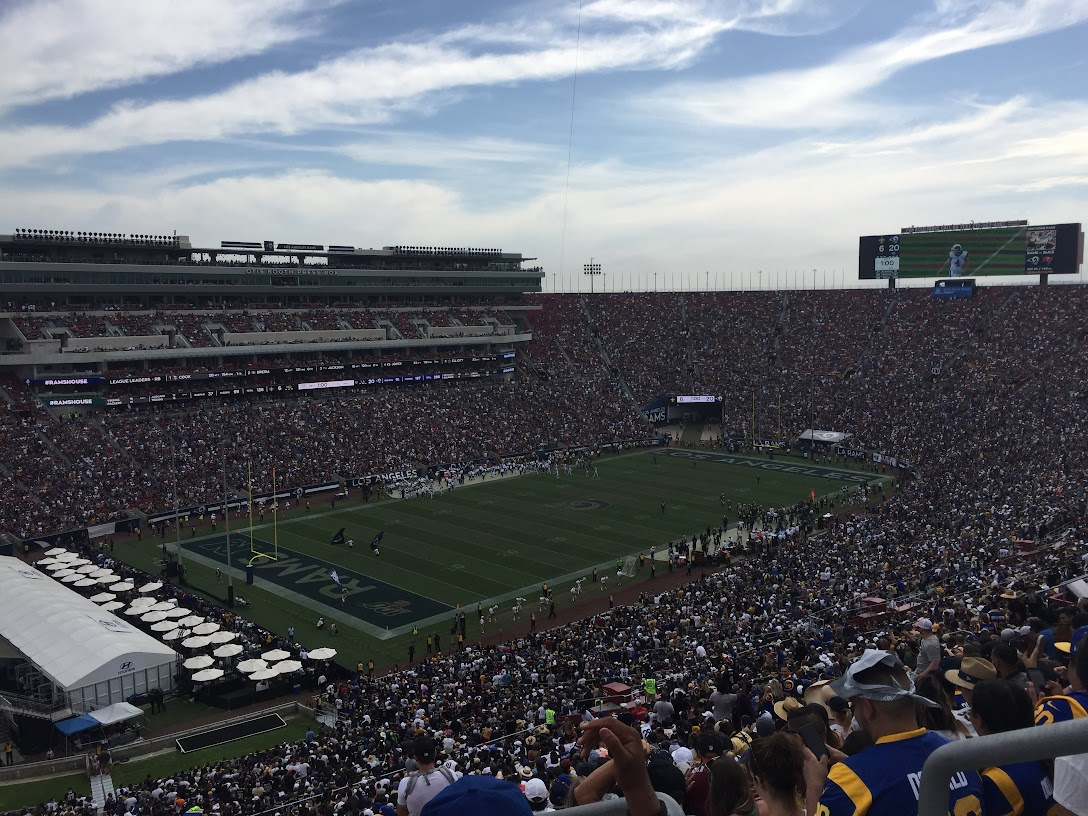
The Saints face off against the Rams during a Week 2 matchup in Los Angeles on September 15, 2019

The win advanced the Rams to Super Bowl LIII against the AFC Champion New England Patriots, the franchise's first Super Bowl since the then-St. Louis Rams advanced to and lost Super Bowl XXXVI after the 2001 season, also against the Patriots. It was the franchise's second Super Bowl appearance as the Los Angeles Rams, the only other appearance coming in a loss to the Pittsburgh Steelers in Super Bowl XIV following the 1979 season. It was also the first Super Bowl appearance for any Los Angeles-based franchise since the then-Los Angeles Raiders defeated the Washington Redskins in Super Bowl XVIII following the 1983 season. In a defensive game at Mercedes-Benz Stadium in Atlanta, the Rams and Patriots entered the fourth quarter tied, 3–3, before the Patriots prevailed by the score of 13–3, in the lowest-scoring Super Bowl in history.

=== Concerns about Todd Gurley's NFC Championship Game performance ===
Aside from the controversial officiating, one topic of note following the NFC Championship Game was the lack of contributions in the game by Todd Gurley. Gurley, the Rams' starting running back for most of the year, had signed a lucrative four-year, $60 million extension in the offseason. He then recorded 1,251 rushing yards, 580 receiving yards, and 21 total touchdowns through the first 14 games of the regular season, his efforts leading to him eventually being named to the Pro Bowl, before he missed the final two games with knee inflammation. In response, the Rams claimed C.J. Anderson off waivers; Anderson started the final two regular season games before both Anderson and Gurley played in the Divisional Round against the Cowboys, with each rushing for over 100 yards. However, in the NFC Championship Game, Gurley recorded just five touches with 13 total scrimmage yards and a rushing touchdown. Many media members suspected he had an injury, but McVay and the Rams insisted that his lack of production was not due to injury but instead to "game flow", with Gurley himself also denying injury and saying simply that his performance was "sorry". Gurley recorded 34 scrimmage yards on 11 touches in the Super Bowl. In March 2019, reports emerged that Gurley had arthritis in his knee, with his trainer confirming his knee had an "arthritic component" later in the offseason. Gurley played the 2019 season for the Rams, but was cut in the offseason after declining production, with three years remaining on his contract. Gurley played one more year for the Falcons in 2020 before eventually retiring from football.

=== 2019 rematch ===
The 2019 season brought about a highly anticipated rematch in Week 2 between the Saints and Rams in Los Angeles; this game also featured a controversial play. With the game tied 3–3 with 6:11 left in the first half, the Rams faced third-and-seven at the Saints' 11 yard line. As quarterback Jared Goff attempted a pass, Trey Hendrickson stripped the ball from his hand and Cameron Jordan returned it 87 yards for a touchdown. However, the officials called it an incomplete pass. After review, the ruling was changed to a fumble. The officials did not credit Jordan with the touchdown, however, stating that the play had already been blown dead, consistent with league rules. The Rams went on to win, 27–9.

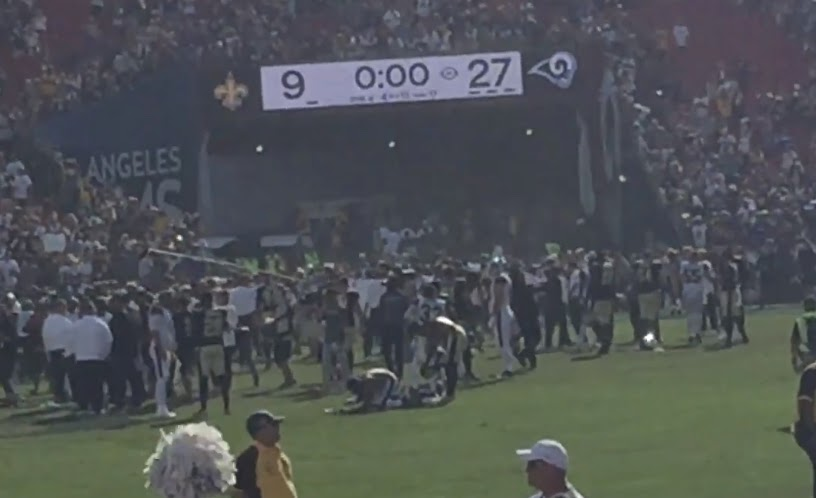
Saints' Receiver Michael Thomas (center) crying at midfield following the loss to the Rams

Saints head coach Sean Payton said after the game that "When we get poor officiating or we get an awful call like that, we can't control that." Cam Jordan directed a jab at the referees, saying, "I didn't even hear the whistle. I grabbed the ball, 15, 20 yards down the field. Allegedly a whistle was blown— clearly, I mean, a whistle was blown. Normally you let the play happen. Any Foot Locker — I mean, referee — usually tells you, you let the play happen, then you go back and review the play."

=== Subsequent events ===
Despite the loss to the Rams during the 2019 regular season, the Saints again finished 13–3 to win the NFC South, while the Rams finished 9–7 and missed the playoffs. This time, the Saints finished in a three-way tie for the best record in the conference and fell to the third seed on tiebreakers, forcing them to play in the wild-card round. During their wild card playoff game, they saw their season end due to another controversial pass interference no-call against the Minnesota Vikings. The Vikings' touchdown pass on the opening drive in overtime from Kirk Cousins to Kyle Rudolph won them the game, 26–20. However, the Saints allege that Rudolph pushed off on Saints cornerback P. J. Williams to gain separation in order to catch the pass, and no foul was called. Had offensive pass interference been called, the Vikings would have faced third and goal from the 14-yard line, and the Saints would have had a chance to force a field goal to stay in the game.

The Saints made the playoffs again in 2020 but were eliminated again at home, this time by the Buccaneers in the Divisional Round, in Drew Brees' last game before his retirement after 20 years in the NFL. Sean Payton retired a year later after missing the playoffs in 2021, though a year after that he announced he was returning to coach the Denver Broncos. The Saints have not qualified for the playoffs since.

The Rams also qualified for the playoffs in 2020, losing to the Packers also in the Divisional Round. That offseason, the Rams and Detroit Lions were involved in a trade that sent Goff to the Lions in exchange for longtime Lions starting quarterback Matthew Stafford. In the first season following the trade, Stafford and McVay helped lead the Rams to a victory over the Bengals in Super Bowl LVI. It was the franchise's second Super Bowl win overall, the first since the then-St. Louis Rams won Super Bowl XXXIV after the 1999 season, and the first NFL Championship for the Los Angeles-based Rams since their pre-Super Bowl NFL Championship in 1951.

After kicking for the Rams for one more season in 2019, Greg Zuerlein signed with the Cowboys as a free agent; he had spent the first eight years of his career with the Rams' organization. Nickell Robey-Coleman also left the Rams in free agency after the 2019 season, signing with the Eagles.

Tommylee Lewis signed with the Lions in free agency following the 2018 season, but did not make the roster. After being signed and released multiple times, he next appeared in five games for the Saints in 2020, and two games for the Dolphins in 2021, recording a single catch each season. He also appeared in the Canadian Football League for the Calgary Stampeders in 2023. As of the 2024 season, the pass interference no-call play remains his only ever receiving target in an NFL postseason game.

== Box score ==
Los Angeles Rams vs. New Orleans Saints – Game summary

| Quarter | 1 | 2 | 3 | 4 | OT | Total |
|---|---|---|---|---|---|---|
| Rams | 0 | 10 | 7 | 6 | 3 | 26 |
| Saints | 13 | 0 | 7 | 3 | 0 | 23 |

at Mercedes-Benz Superdome, New Orleans, Louisiana

- Date: January 20, 2019
- Game time: 2:05 p.m. CST
- Game weather: Played indoors (domed stadium)
- Game attendance: 73,028
- Referee: Bill Vinovich
- TV announcers (Fox): Joe Buck, Troy Aikman
- Recap, Pro Football Reference, Game Book

Scoring summary

| Quarter | Time | Drive | | | Team | Scoring information | Score | |
| Quarter | Time | Plays | Yards | TOP | Team | Scoring information | LAR | NO |
|---|---|---|---|---|---|---|---|---|
| 1 | 10:04 | 11 | 56 | 4:56 | NO | 37-yard field goal by Wil Lutz | 0 | 3 |
| 1 | 7:06 | 4 | 6 | 1:29 | NO | 29-yard field goal by Wil Lutz | 0 | 6 |
| 1 | 1:35 | 8 | 63 | 3:51 | NO | Garrett Griffin 5-yard touchdown reception from Drew Brees, Wil Lutz kick good | 0 | 13 |
| 2 | 9:45 | 14 | 62 | 6:50 | LAR | 36-yard field goal by Greg Zuerlein | 3 | 13 |
| 2 | 0:23 | 7 | 81 | 1:29 | LAR | Todd Gurley 6-yard touchdown run, Greg Zuerlein kick good | 10 | 13 |
| 3 | 8:34 | 12 | 71 | 5:31 | NO | Taysom Hill 2-yard touchdown reception from Drew Brees, Wil Lutz kick good | 10 | 20 |
| 3 | 2:15 | 10 | 70 | 5:28 | LAR | Tyler Higbee 1-yard touchdown reception from Jared Goff, Greg Zuerlein kick good | 17 | 20 |
| 4 | 5:03 | 9 | 90 | 5:52 | LAR | 24-yard field goal by Greg Zuerlein | 20 | 20 |
| 4 | 1:41 | 9 | 57 | 3:22 | NO | 31-yard field goal by Wil Lutz | 20 | 23 |
| 4 | 0:15 | 9 | 45 | 1:26 | LAR | 48-yard field goal by Greg Zuerlein | 23 | 23 |
| OT | 11:43 | 5 | 15 | 2:12 | LAR | 57-yard field goal by Greg Zuerlein | 26 | 23 |
| "TOP" = time of possession. For other American football terms, see Glossary of American football. | | | | | | | 26 | 23 |

== Personnel ==
=== Starting lineups ===
| Los Angeles | Position | Position | New Orleans |
Offense
| Tyler Higbee | TE | WR | Tre'Quan Smith |
| Andrew Whitworth | LT | | Terron Armstead |
| Rodger Saffold | LG | | Andrus Peat |
| John Sullivan | C | | Max Unger |
| Austin Blythe | RG | | Larry Warford |
| Rob Havenstein | RT | | Ryan Ramczyk |
| Gerald Everett | TE | | Garrett Griffin |
| Brandin Cooks | WR | | Michael Thomas |
| Jared Goff | QB | | Drew Brees |
| Robert Woods | WR | | Ted Ginn Jr. |
| Todd Gurley | HB | RB | Mark Ingram II |
Defense
| Michael Brockers | DE | LDE | Cameron Jordan |
| Ndamukong Suh | NT | | Tyeler Davison |
| Aaron Donald | DT | | David Onyemata |
| Dante Fowler | WILL | | Demario Davis |
| Cory Littleton | ILB | RDE | Alex Okafor |
| Mark Barron | ILB | SAM | A. J. Klein |
| Nickell Robey-Coleman | CB | | Marshon Lattimore |
| Marcus Peters | LCB | | Eli Apple |
| Aqib Talib | RCB | S | Vonn Bell |
| Lamarcus Joyner | SS | CB | P. J. Williams |
| John Johnson | SS | FS | Marcus Williams |
Special teams
| Greg Zuerlein | K | | Wil Lutz |
| Johnny Hekker | P | | Thomas Morstead |

=== Officials ===
Officials adapted from official NFL game summary.

- Referee: Bill Vinovich (#52)
- Umpire: Bruce Stritesky (#102)
- Down Judge: Patrick Turner (#13)
- Line Judge: Rusty Baynes (#59)
- Field Judge: Tom Hill (#97)
- Side Judge: Gary Cavaletto (#60)
- Back Judge: Todd Prukop (#30)
- Replay Official: Mike Wimmer (#0)

== See also ==
- Bottlegate
- Fail Mary — another controversial officiating decision from 2012
- Dez Caught It — A 2014 divisional round game with a controversial ending.
- Pass interference
- Rams–Saints rivalry
