= Rams–Saints rivalry =

National Football League rivalry

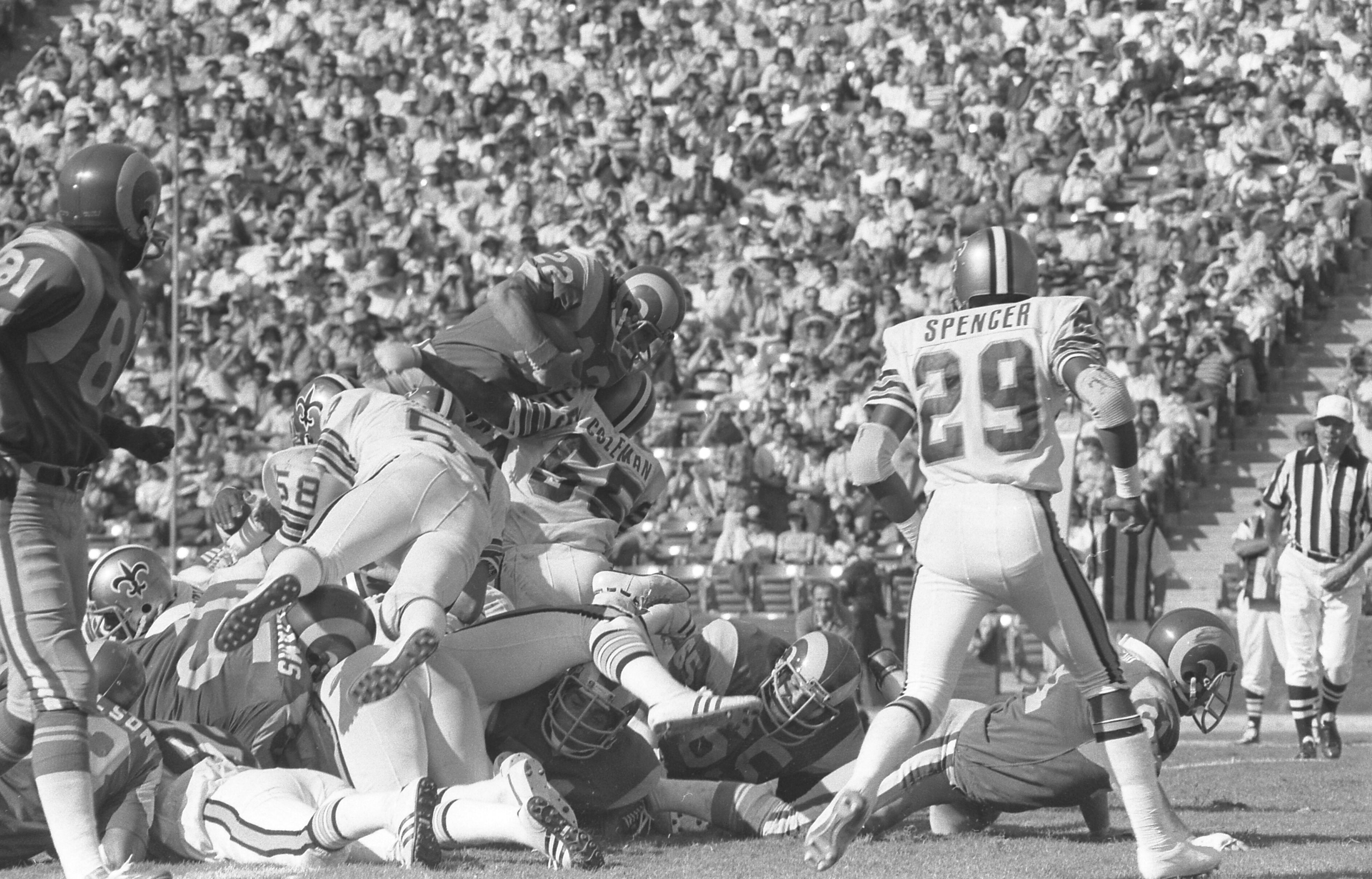
- The Rams and Saints playing in 1975

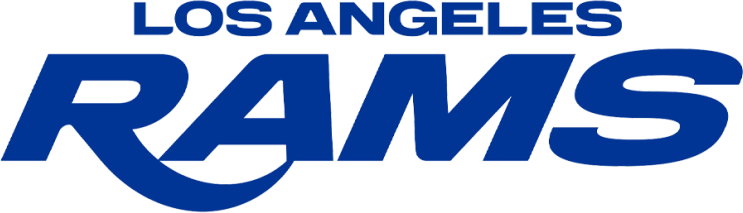
- Los Angeles Rams New Orleans Saints
- First meeting: September 17, 1967; Rams 27, Saints 13
- Latest meeting: November 2, 2025; Rams 34, Saints 10
- Next meeting: TBD (no later than 2028 regular season)

Statistics
- Total meetings: 81
- All-time series: Rams: 46–35
- Regular season series: Rams: 45–34
- Postseason results: Tied: 1–1
- Largest victory: Rams, 43–12 (1999); Saints, 37–6 (1993)
- Longest win streak: Saints, 7 (1990–1993)
- Current win streak: Rams: 3

Post-season history
- 2000 NFC Wild Card: Saints won: 31–28; 2018 NFC Championship: Rams won: 26–23(OT)

The Rams–Saints rivalry is an NFL rivalry between the Los Angeles Rams and New Orleans Saints. Both teams were originally members of the NFC West prior to the 2002 league realignment. The rivalry temporarily grew dormant for multiple years following the divisional realignment until tensions regrew between both teams during the 2010s; most notably involving the controversial 2018 NFC Championship Game. The Rams lead the regular season series 45–34, both teams are tied 1–1 in the postseason.

The Rams first faced off against the Saints' during their inaugural kickoff in 1967. However; during the 1970s, the two teams would develop into fierce divisional rivals as Saints' pro-bowl quarterback Archie Manning often battled against the Rams' notorious Fearsome Foursome defenses. The two teams continued a history of fierce divisional matchups into the 1980s as the Dome Patrol era Saints teams continued to battle with the title-contending Rams led by coach John Robinson.

Because they play in different intraconference divisions, the Saints and Rams are not guaranteed to play each other every season. The two teams will play at least once every three years and at least once every six seasons at each team's home stadium due to the NFL's schedule rotation among its divisions. The two teams will also play each other if they meet in the playoffs or both finish in the same place in their respective divisions the previous year.

== History ==
=== 1960s/1970s ===
The Saints entered the league as an expansion franchise in the NFC West, beginning play in 1967. Their inaugural game took place against the Rams on September 17, 1967 as the Saints scored on the opening kickoff, as rookie wide-receiver John Gilliam ran the ball 94 yards for a touchdown. Despite this, the Rams defense, led by Hall of Fame linemen Deacon Jones and Merlin Olsen, crushed the Saints as they would only manage two field goals. The Rams would go onto win the game 27–13. New Orleans' first coach was former Rams Hall of Fame receiver Tom Fears, who went 0–3 vs. his former team before being fired midway through the 1970 season; ironically, his last game was a 30–17 loss to the Rams at home, a game in which the Saints blew a 14–0 lead.

The Saints would draft future pro-bowl quarterback Archie Manning second-overall in the 1971 NFL draft, quickly becoming one of the few stars on an underwhelming team. Despite Manning's impressive play, the Rams would further torment the Saints, winning 12 of the 18 matchups against New Orleans from 1970 to 1979. Reportedly; Rams' hall-of-fame defensive end Jack Youngblood would often spare Manning from a collision after several seasons as they feared for his safety due to the poor protection from the Saints' offensive linemen. As a result of this, Manning often spoke with much praise for the Rams' defensemen, telling the Los Angeles Times on September 23, 1974, "The Rams front four is the best I ever faced ... I've got to say that Youngblood was nice enough to pick me up every time he knocked my ass off." During several recent interviews, Manning joked that Youngblood's career would not have been as successful without him.

=== 1980s ===
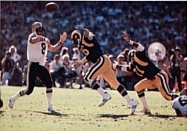
Rams’ defensive end Cody Jones attempts to tackle Archie Manning during a 1980 game at Anaheim Stadium

Entering the 1980s, Manning and the Saints struggled further as they finished the 1980 season with a league-worst 1–15 record. Famously during a Monday Night Football game on November 24, 1980 at the Louisiana Superdome, the Rams blew out the Saints 27–7, continuing the Saints' 12-game loss streak (it reached 14 before a one-point win vs. the New York Jets). Saints broadcaster "Buddy D" Diliberto had jokingly advised Saints fans to attend the game with paper bags over their heads. Shortly afterwards; multiple fans arrived in attendance; adopting the trend, dubbing the team the "Aint's" as a humorous reaction to the team's poor play that season. Despite the poor 1980 campaign from the Saints, both teams would finally emerge as contenders during the decade. The San Francisco 49ers had proven to be a juggernaut of the division under Bill Walsh and Joe Montana. This left the Rams and Saints to fight for 2nd place of the division most often, the Rams stayed as a substantial competitor while the Saints had finally emerged as a contender, led by new coach Jim Mora, and their sturdy Dome Patrol defense. The Rams and Saints had finished in 2nd or 3rd in the NFC west every season from 1982 to 1989, excluding the 1985 campaign which saw the Rams top the 49ers for the division title. During the 1988 season, both teams were tied for second place after a Saints' upset victory over the Rams in Anaheim. The Saints were eager to return to the postseason following their 1987 campaign bringing the franchise to their first playoff appearance, though the strength of the defense had helped their push, the Rams stumbled following the loss to the Saints, but managed to win their final 3 consecutive games, narrowly beating out the Saints for the wild card berth. The 1989 season saw the Rams start out of the gate to a 5–1 start before they faced the Saints at home in Week 7. The Saints shockingly upset the Rams in a 40–21 blowout, the worst loss the Rams would endure that season. Despite the loss, the Rams sought vengeance when they returned to New Orleans for their Week 12 matchup on November 26. The game saw the Saints' defense take hold, as they held the Rams 17-3 going into the third quarter. The Rams' offense quickly prevailed in a potent attack as receiver Flipper Anderson finished the game with 336 yards receiving, while Jim Everett would humiliate the Saints defense, ending the game with 454 passing yards in the overtime victory, records which still stand as of 2023.

=== 1990s ===
The 1990s would not fare too kindly for the Rams, poor ownership under Georgia Frontiere saw the team regress massively after their NFC Championship appearance in 1989, the 1990 season would mark the second time in 12 seasons the Saints had beaten them for the 2nd place position in the division. The Saints had also managed their first sweep of the Rams since 1987, as their once stellar offense had devolved massively. The Saints had now taken control of the series while the Rams struggled largely due to declining fan interest and budgetary issues blamed on Frontiere. The Saints would manage a six game win streak over the Rams during their final four seasons in Los Angeles before relocating to St. Louis in 1995. The Saints' playoff aspirations would also dwindle as they failed to appear in the postseason from 1993 to 1999. Despite the decline in St. Louis, the Rams quickly resurged into contention during the 1999 season under head coach Dick Vermeil and quarterback Kurt Warner. During the Week 12 matchup in St. Louis, the Rams would obliterate the Saints 43–12, eventually sweeping the Saints after being swept by New Orleans the season prior, on their way to win Super Bowl XXXIV.

=== 2000s ===
The decade opened with the Rams riding high on their legendary offense dubbed The Greatest Show on Turf, despite this; their defense had fallen to the worst in the league for the 2000 season. Dick Vermeil had retired, promoting Mike Martz as head coach while the Saints hired Jim Haslett as their new head coach. Despite splitting the season matchups with the Saints, and both finishing with a 10–6 record; the Saints managed to beat out the Rams for the division title based on their divisional record. The Rams were set to face the Saints at the superdome in the 2000 NFC Wild Card game. Despite being heavy favorites to win; the Rams offense had struggled, failing to score in two consecutive quarters. Kurt Warner would turn the ball over four times as the Saints managed to edge past the Rams in the upset victory.

Despite the victory, the Saints would fall to the Vikings in the Divisional round. The Saints never managed to return to the postseason under Haslett as they declined during the middle of the decade, bottoming out during a chaotic 2005 season when they were displaced from their home by Hurricane Katrina and went 3–13. The Rams had also begun a decline as Martz' questionable leadership had begun to tear the team apart following their loss in Super Bowl XXXVI (coincidentally, in the Superdome) the season prior. The NFL had sought to realign the divisions as the introduction of the Houston Texans franchise in 2002 had warranted the creation of eight divisions across the league, relegating the Saints to the newly formed NFC South with fellow rivals the Atlanta Falcons, Carolina Panthers and Tampa Bay Buccaneers. The Rams would make their final postseason appearance in St. Louis following the 2004 season. The Saints had begun a return to form under new head coach Sean Payton and quarterback Drew Brees in 2006, hiring former Rams' assistant coach Joe Vitt in the process. Under Payton, the team managed to win Super Bowl XLIV in 2009. Meanwhile the Rams had sunken to a franchise-low 1–15 record during the 2009 season as they were shuffling coaches and enduring multiple ownership issues following the death of Georgia Frontiere in January 2008.

=== 2010s ===
Entering the new decade, the Rams were deep into a rebuild while the Saints remained a formidable playoff contender under Payton. The Rams; impressed by the Saints' defense, had sought to hire Gregg Williams from New Orleans as their Defensive Coordinator in 2012. Meanwhile; the Saints were under investigation from the league after suspicion had grown over the Saints allegedly bribing players to target opponents in violent hits on-field. Less than a month after his hiring with the Rams, Williams and Payton were implicated in the New Orleans Saints bounty scandal after it was revealed the team had paid multiple defensive players to target opposing teams with the intent of injuring the opposition. As a result, Payton was suspended for the entirety of the 2012 season while Williams was suspended indefinitely and fired by the Rams on January 2, 2013. Despite this; former colleague Jeff Fisher sought to rehire Williams on the Rams prior to the 2014 season. The Rams had grown increasingly dissatisfied with their accommodations in St. Louis as their stadium had grown increasingly outdated and attendance had sunk to new lows, prompting owner Stan Kroenke to return the team to Los Angeles in 2016.

Prior to the 2016 season, the Rams had traded up to draft quarterback Jared Goff first overall. The Saints, holding only five picks in that year's draft; had drafted wide receiver Michael Thomas during the second round of the draft. The Rams returned to Los Angeles for the 2016 season, though Fisher's coaching staff proved unable to steer the team towards much success as they went on to finish 4–12. In the midst of the team's struggles, they endured a brutal loss to the Saints in New Orleans during week 12. Fisher had grown an increasingly strained relationship with his players, including Goff who had seen little time on-field since being drafted. Fisher finally made the decision to start Goff over Case Keenum after a terrible 4-interception game against the New York Giants in London. Spurred by his teammates, Goff managed to score his first touchdown against the Saints in only his third pass. Despite Goff's individual performance; the Saints would blow out the Rams 49–21, tying for the largest victory in the series. Payton reportedly had sought retribution against Williams for their involvement in the Bountygate scandal as multiple players reported he was cheering festively on the Saints' sideline. The Rams fired Jeff Fisher and his staff (including Williams) two weeks later, as they finished 4-12 to a rough return to Los Angeles. During the 2016 offseason, several media outlets reported that the Rams were possibly looking to hire Payton from the Saints as their new head coach. However; Payton declined to accept their offer as he had chosen to remain under his new five-year contract extension as head coach of the Saints, signed a year prior.

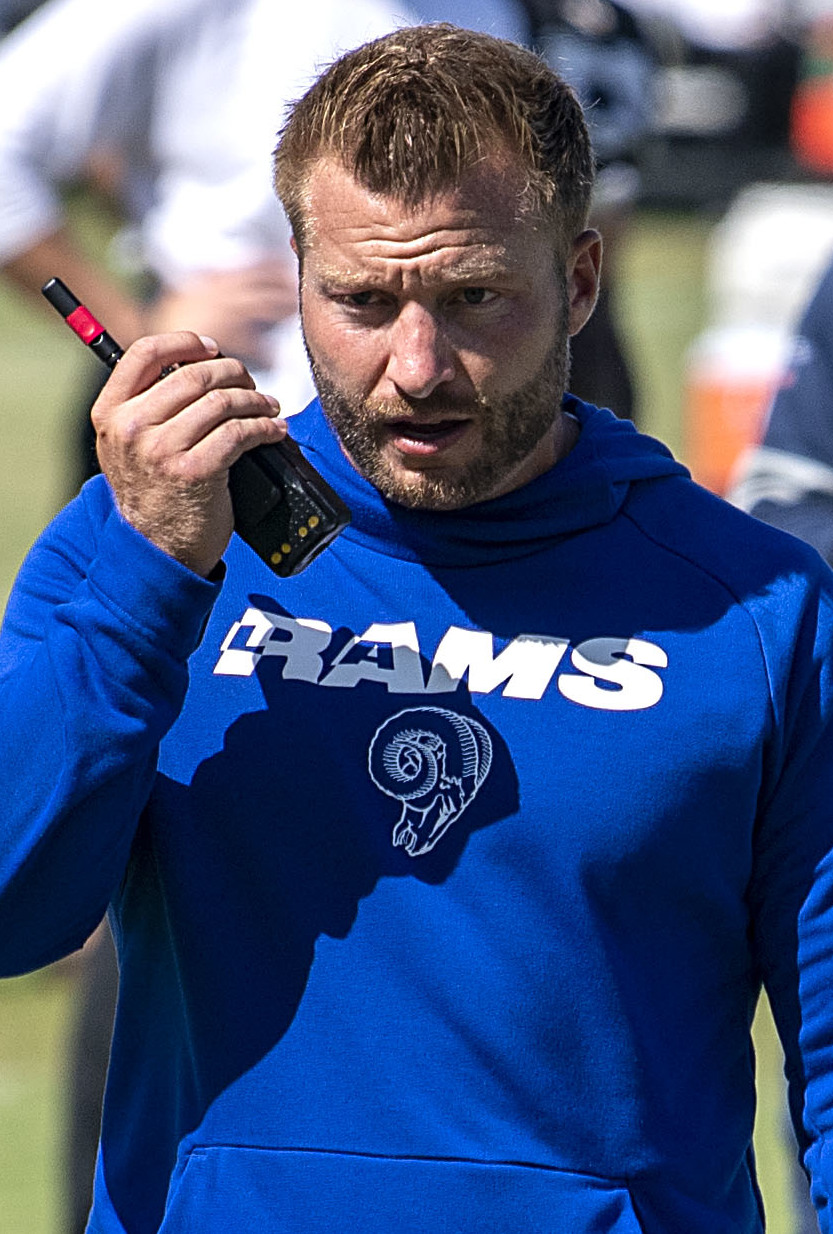
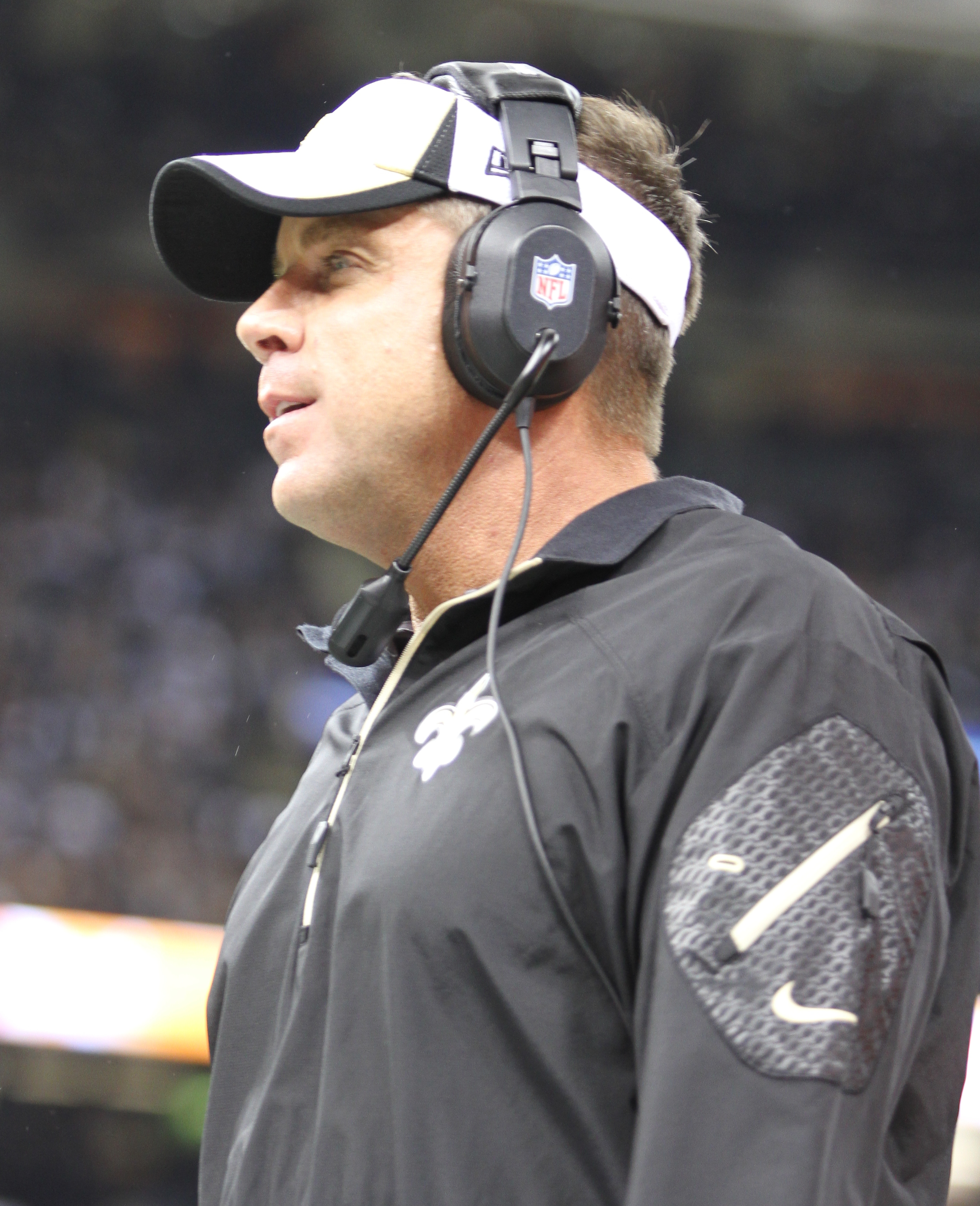
Rams' head coach Sean McVay and the Saints' former coach Sean Payton both rebuilt their teams into regular playoff contenders through the decade.

The Rams subsequently hired former Redskins' offensive coordinator Sean McVay as they continued to rebuild their coaching staff. The two teams met that season during another Week 12 matchup in Los Angeles. Rams' running back Todd Gurley had been in the midst of a potent season in which the Rams' offense lead the league (he would later win the Offensive Player of the Year award). The Saints had seen a near-equally successful campaign with rookie running back Alvin Kamara as the Saints still maintained the fifth best offense in the league that season while the Saints had been on an eight game winstreak. Quarterbacks Drew Brees and Jared Goff had nearly combined for over 600 yards that game. Kamara had emerged as a potent dual-threat back that game as he would manage six receptions and two touchdowns that game. Todd Gurley would not manage as strong of a game as Kamara though he nearly managed 80 yards rushing. The Rams managed to pull ahead in no small part thanks to their thriving offense under receivers Sammy Watkins and Robert Woods as they managed to edge past the Saints 26-20.

==== 2018 season ====
“Tell Sean Payton to keep talking that shit, and I hope you see me soon. We’re going to have a nice little bowl of gumbo together.”

— Marcus Peters, Rams Cornerback

The 2018 season saw both teams launch out of the gate as the two most dominant teams in the league, the Rams started the year with an 8-0 record as they headed into New Orleans for their Week 9 matchup. The season prior; Michael Thomas and newly-acquired Rams' receiver Brandin Cooks began an online feud after the latter signed with the New England Patriots and was later traded to the Rams. The Rams had boasted the best rushing and 2nd best passing offense in the league as Jared Goff and Todd Gurley were in the midst of pro bowl seasons, however; despite their efforts to amount a comeback in the second half; the Saints defense had locked up their offense, leaving them down by two carries. Despite the Rams' best efforts to attempt a comeback; the Saints were firmly in control of the game. Michael Thomas utilized the opportunity to taunt the Rams and Cooks in the form of recreating Joe Horn's famous cellphone celebration after scoring a touchdown in the fourth quarter; enraging the Rams' sideline. Thomas would be fined $30,000 for the gesture as multiple players on the Rams had expressed anger at Thomas and Payton, cornerback Marcus Peters expressed his hatred of the Saints in response to Payton's comments about Peters' play covering Thomas, exclaiming "Tell Sean Payton to keep talking shit, We're gonna meet up and have a nice bowl of Gumbo together later on".

=== 2018 NFC Championship ===
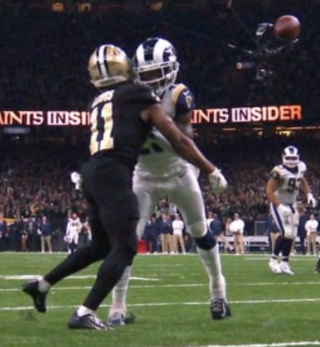
Rams cornerback Nickell Robey-Coleman (white jersey) hits Saints receiver Tommylee Lewis that was uncalled by the officials

The two teams would finish the year with a 13-3 record as they would eventually face one another in the 2018 NFC Championship Game in New Orleans. The Rams struggled out of the gate as the Saints pulled ahead 13-10 by the half, though soon enough; the Rams' defense took hold and began minimizing the lead as the game progressed into the fourth quarter. Michael Thomas in particular had played poorly, catching 7 passes for 36 yards as he battled Peters and Aqib Talib throughout most of the game. On a critical third down play with the game tied 20-20 at the Rams' 13 yard line; Brees would throw a pass to Tommylee Lewis though the pass was incomplete as he was hit by Rams' cornerback Nickell Robey-Coleman. Payton was livid with the call as multiple fans and Saints players had noted the hit was possibly illegal as Coleman's hit came 3 seconds prior to the pass reaching his vicinity. Robey-Coleman would later express confusion after the hit as he was also expecting a penalty flag. Announcers Joe Buck and Troy Aikman were also confused as no flag was thrown by either officials following the hit. The Rams had only one timeout remaining as the Saints would have likely utilized the drive to secure the victory, however; the Saints were forced to settle for a field goal as the Rams later tied the game as it led into overtime. In overtime the Saints managed to win the coin toss as a pass interference call would also set them up on a 2nd and 16, killing their drive for a critically needed touchdown. Upon the snap; Brees was charged by Rams' linebacker Dante Fowler as he had targeted Michael Thomas to save the play, the pass was ultimately intercepted by safety John Johnson who mockingly imitated Thomas' horse-celebration in retaliation. Following the game, a minor scrum broke out between players angry over the call, Marcus Peters allegedly began scouring the locker rooms in search of Sean Payton. In an humorous effort to further troll the Saints in retaliation to Thomas' gesture earlier in the season, Todd Gurley posted a photoshopped picture online depicting himself in a jersey swap with referee Bill Vinovich, mocking the no-call. Payton later addressed reporters during the post-game press conference, furious as he expressed his anger at the call, attacking the Rams and the officiating team, "Disappointing way to lose a game...frustrating, you know. Just getting off the phone with the league office. They blew the call. We had a lot of opportunities though, but that call puts it first and ten, we only need three plays, it's a game changing call. That's where it's at". Thomas was equally enraged, attacking both the Rams and the officiating crew during his postgame interview.

“As Far as next year? we're going back, and we're coming back with revenge for sure. I saw exactly what you saw, that was pass interference”

— Michael Thomas, Saints Receiver

The Rams would advance to Super Bowl LIII though they would fall to the New England Patriots 13-3. Saints fans would sign an online petition and attempt to file a lawsuit against the league for the call, but it would ultimately be dismissed.

During an interview on August 5, 2023; Jared Goff (who had been traded to Detroit prior to the 2021 season) continued to troll the Saints after being asked on his perspective of the no-call, unapologetically claiming the Saints blew their opportunity by throwing an interception once they received the ball in overtime.

=== 2019–present ===
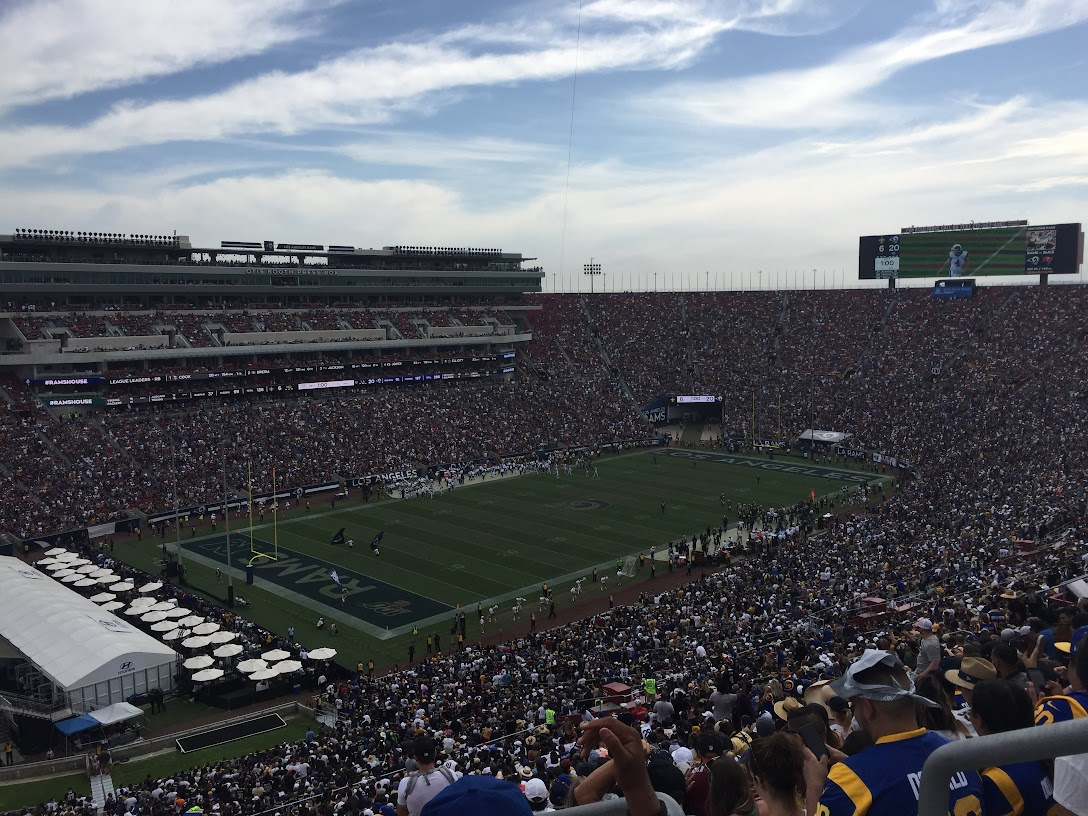
The Saints face off against the Rams during a Week 2 matchup in Los Angeles on September 15, 2019

The 2019 season saw the two teams meet again in Los Angeles, though the Rams' had eagerly anticipated the matchup as the Saints had harbored much anger against them from the season prior. The Week 2 matchup was not without controversy as the game was tied 3–3 with 6:11 remaining in the second quarter. The Rams were at the Saints' 11 yard line. As Goff attempted a pass, Saints' defensive end Trey Hendrickson stripped the ball from his hand, which was recovered by Saints' linebacker Cameron Jordan, who returned it 87 yards for a touchdown. However, an official blew the play dead, meaning that the return and touchdown were negated even though New Orleans was allowed to retain possession. Brees suffered an injury to his hand from Rams' defensive tackle Aaron Donald and was replaced by backup Teddy Bridgewater, who struggled in relief of Brees. The Rams, despite struggling on offense for two and a half quarters, woke up and ran away with a 27–9 victory. Michael Thomas was particularly upset by the victory as he was seen crying on the Saints' sideline following the game. Despite the victory, the Rams struggled mightily as injuries, poor offensive line play, and overall inconsistency contributed to the team finishing 9–7 and missing the postseason. The Saints, despite losing their star quarterback for five starts, managed another 13–3 campaign but fell in an upset loss to the Minnesota Vikings in the first round of the playoffs.

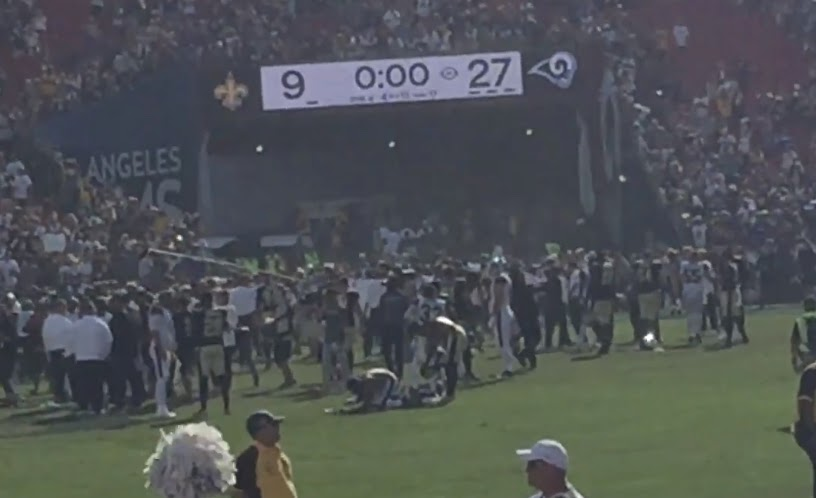
Saints' Receiver Michael Thomas (center) crying at midfield following a Week 2 loss to the Rams on September 15, 2019

Though the two teams did not play each other during the 2021 NFL season, an injury-riddled Saints team, who entered the final week of the season with an 8–8 record, needed a win against their longtime rival Atlanta Falcons and, ironically, a Rams' win against the San Francisco 49ers, to make the 2021-22 NFL playoffs. The Saints took care of their own business in Atlanta to finish the season with a 9–8 record. But the Rams, despite holding a 17-point lead on their longtime rival, could not finish the job, and the 49ers won 27–24 in overtime to clinch a playoff spot and eliminate New Orleans from playoff contention. Had the Rams defeated the 49ers, both the 49ers and Saints would have finished with 9–8 records, but the Saints would have owned the tiebreaker and made the playoffs instead of the 49ers. Instead, the 49ers finished one game better than the Saints, and the Saints ended up being the first team on the outside looking in the playoff picture despite finishing with the same record as the 7th-seeded Philadelphia Eagles, who defeated New Orleans earlier that season and thus owned the tiebreaker for the final playoff spot. The Rams' loss to the 49ers gave the Saints and their fans even more motivation for the following season's game between the two teams. The Rams would go on to win Super Bowl LVI a month later.

The intensity between both teams had lessened in the following years, though many New Orleans fans harbor much animosity towards the Rams to this day. Following Todd Gurley's release from the Rams in 2019, it was reported that the Saints had offered to sign the running back. However; Gurley who grew up a fan of the Atlanta Falcons; rejected the Saints' offer and signed with the Falcons. The two teams were deadlocked in competition during the 2022 offseason following the Rams' victory in Super Bowl LVI, as they were both eager to sign safety Tyrann Mathieu, but he would eventually sign with the Saints despite being persuaded by Rams' cornerback Jalen Ramsey. The two teams met during the 2022 season, with the Saints winning as the Rams were once again plagued with roster injuries.

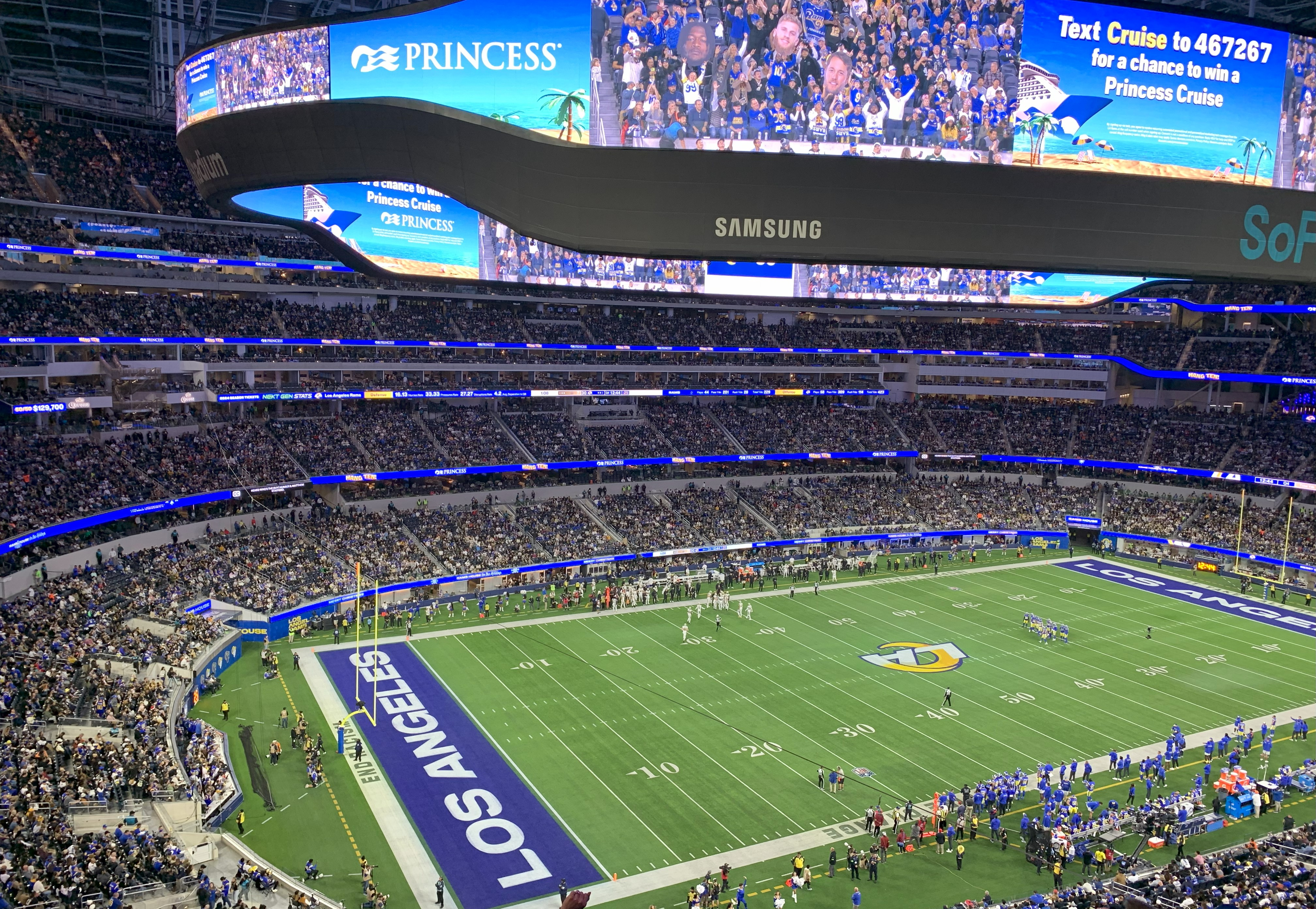
The Rams host the Saints on December 21, 2023

The two teams met again in 2023 at SoFi Stadium, marking the Saints' first regular season appearance in the Rams' new stadium. Both teams entered the matchup with identical 7–7 records. A win for either team in this game would have had strong playoff implications as the Rams held tiebreaker over fellow division-rival Seattle Seahawks, as the Saints did not share the same advantage over Tampa Bay who led the NFC South. The Rams won the game by a final score of 30–22, critically damaging the Saints' playoff hopes; despite finishing with a 9–8 record, New Orleans missed the playoffs due to losing tiebreakers against the Buccaneers for the division title and the Green Bay Packers for the third wild card spot. The Rams finished with a 10–7 record and the second wild card, but were narrowly defeated by the Detroit Lions in the wild card round.

== Connections between the teams ==
Name	Position(s)	Rams' tenure	Saints' tenure
Jim Haslett	Defensive Coordinator/Head Coach	2006–2008	1995–1996, 2000–2005
Wade Phillips	Defensive Coordinator	2017–2019	1981–1985
Brandin Cooks	Wide Receiver	2018–2019	2014–2016
Henry Ellard	Wide Receiver/Wide Receivers Coach	1983–1993 (as player); 2001-2008 (as WR coach)	2012–2014
Gregg Williams	Defensive Coordinator	2012, 2014–2016	2009–2011
Marc Bulger	Quarterback	2000–2009	2000
Jared Cook	Tight End	2013–2015	2019–2020
Ethan Westbrooks	Defensive End	2014–2018	2021
Joe Vitt	Linebackers Coach/Defensive Coordinator	1992–1994, 2004–2005	2006–2016

== Season-by-season results ==
Los Angeles/St. Louis Rams vs. New Orleans Saints season-by-season results
1960s–1970s (Rams, 16–6)

Season	Season Series	at Los Angeles Rams	at New Orleans Saints	Overall series	Notes
1967	Rams 1–0	—N/a	Rams; 27-13	Rams; 1–0	Saints join the league as an expansion franchise. In their first regular season game, John Gilliam returns opening kickoff 94 yards for a touchdown.
1969	Rams 1–0	Rams; 36–17	—N/a	Rams; 2–0	
1970	Rams 2–0	Rams; 34–16	Rams; 30–17	Rams; 4–0	Saints placed in NFC West with Rams, 49ers and Falcons following AFL-NFL merger, and will remain until 2002.
1971	Tie 1–1	Rams; 45–28	Saints; 24–20	Rams; 5–1	In his first NFL game, Archie Manning scores the game-winning touchdown on the final play at New Orleans. Saints' first win vs. Rams. Considered the hottest game in NFL history.
1972	Tie 1–1	Rams; 34–14	Saints; 19–16	Rams; 6–2	
1973	Rams 2–0	Rams; 29–7	Rams; 24–13	Rams; 8–2	
1974	Tie 1–1	Rams; 24–0	Saints; 20–7	Rams; 9–3	
1975	Rams 2–0	Rams; 38–14	Rams; 14–7	Rams; 11–3	First matchup in the Louisiana Superdome.
1976	Rams 2–0	Rams; 16–10	Rams; 33–14	Rams; 13–3	
1977	Tie 1–1	Rams; 14–7	Saints; 27–26	Rams; 14–4	Rams win nine straight home meetings (1969–1977).
1978	Tie 1–1	Saints; 10–3	Rams; 26–20	Rams; 15–5	Saints’ win handed the Rams their first loss of the season after a 7–0 start.
1979	Tie 1–1	Rams; 35–17	Saints; 29–14	Rams; 16–6	Rams lose Super Bowl XIV to the Pittsburgh Steelers. The game at Los Angeles is the Rams' last home game in the Coliseum until 2016.

1980s (Rams, 10–8)

Season	Season Series	at Los Angeles Rams	at New Orleans Saints	Overall series	Notes
1980	Rams 2–0	Rams; 45–31	Rams; 27–7	Rams; 18–6	Saints' infamous 1–15 season, fans wear paper bags to the game against the Rams on November 24, 1980, in New Orleans. First series matchup at Anaheim Stadium. The game in New Orleans was the last for Saints head coach Dick Nolan before he was fired.
1981	Saints 2–0	Saints; 21–13	Saints; 23–17	Rams; 18–8	Saints' first sweep of the series.
1982	No games			Rams; 18–8	
1983	Rams 2–0	Rams; 30–27	Rams; 26–24	Rams; 20–8	Both 1982 matcwere hups canceled due to a player strike. Rams clinch a playoff berth and eliminate Saints in regular-season finale at New Orleans.
1984	Rams 2–0	Rams; 34–21	Rams; 28–10	Rams; 22–8	
1985	Tie 1–1	Rams; 28–10	Saints; 29–3	Rams; 23–9	Rams win the NFC West for the first time since 1979, but lost the NFC Championship to the Chicago Bears. The game at New Orleans is the first for Saints interim coach Wade Phillips.
1986	Tie 1–1	Rams; 26–13	Saints; 6–0	Rams; 24–10	
1987	Saints 2–0	Saints; 31–14	Saints; 37–10	Rams; 24–12	Game at New Orleans played with replacement players during the 1987 NFL Players' Strike. Saints enjoy first winning season and first playoff berth in 21st season.
1988	Tie 1–1	Saints; 14–10	Rams; 12–10	Rams; 25–14	Both teams finished 10–6, though the Rams knocked the Saints out of the playoffs due to a better division record.
1989	Tie 1–1	Saints; 41–20	Rams; 20–17(OT)	Rams; 26–15	Flipper Anderson sets NFL single-game receiving yardage record (336) at New Orleans. Rams lose in NFC Championship to the San Francisco 49ers.

1990s (Saints, 12–8)

Season	Season Series	at Los Angeles/St. Louis Rams	at New Orleans Saints	Overall series	Notes
1990	Saints 2–0	Saints; 24–20	Saints; 20–17	Rams; 26–17	
1991	Saints 2–0	Saints; 24–17	Saints; 24–7	Rams; 26–18	Saints win NFC West for the first time in franchise history.
1992	Saints 2–0	Saints; 34–14	Saints; 13–10	Rams; 26–20	
1993	Tie 1–1	Saints; 37–6	Rams; 23–20	Rams; 27–21	Saints win eight straight meetings (1989–1993).
1994	Saints 2–0	Saints; 31–15	Saints; 37–34	Rams; 27–23	Saints win eight straight road meetings (1987–1994). Final series matchup in Los Angeles until 2016. As of the 2026 season, this is the last time the Saints have defeated the Rams in Los Angeles.
1995	Tie 1–1	Rams; 17–13	Saints; 19–10	Rams; 28–24	Rams' first game in St. Louis played at Busch Stadium. Saints' first game in Busch since losing to Cardinals in 1987.
1996	Rams 2–0	Rams; 14–13	Rams; 26–10	Rams; 30–24	The Rams' first sweep since 1985.
1997	Rams 2–0	Rams; 38–24	Rams; 34–27	Rams; 32–24	
1998	Saints 2–0	Saints; 24–17	Saints; 24–3	Rams; 32–26	
1999	Rams 2–0	Rams; 43–12	Rams; 30–14	Rams; 34–26	Rams win Super Bowl XXXIV.

2000s (Saints, 5–4)

Season	Results	Location	Overall series	Notes
2000	Saints; 31–24	Trans World Dome	Rams; 35–27	
2000	Rams; 26–21	Louisiana Superdome	Rams; 35–27	
2000 Playoffs	Saints; 31–28	Louisiana Superdome	Rams; 35–28	NFC Wild Card Round. First playoff meeting between the two teams. After leading 31-13 in the fourth quarter, the Rams scored two late touchdowns to cut the lead to three points. The Saints recovered a muffed punt late to seal the win. Saints win their first playoff game in franchise history.
2001	Saints; 34–31	Trans World Dome	Rams; 36–29	Saints’ win handed the Rams their first loss of the season after a 6–0 start.
2001	Rams; 34–21	Louisiana Superdome	Rams; 36–29	Final matchup before division realignment moves the Saints to the NFC South. Rams lose Super Bowl XXXVI.
2004	Saints; 28–25(OT)	Louisiana Superdome	Rams; 36–30	
2005	Rams; 28–17	Edward Jones Dome	Rams; 37–30	
2007	Rams; 37–29	Louisiana Superdome	Rams; 38–30	First start in the series for Drew Brees.
2009	Saints; 28–23	Edward Jones Dome	Rams; 38–31	Saints win Super Bowl XLIV

2010s (Rams, 5–3)

Season	Results	Location	Overall series	Notes
2010	Saints; 31–13	Mercedes-Benz Superdome	Rams; 38–32	
2011	Rams; 31–21	Edward Jones Dome	Rams; 39–32	Rams win despite finishing season 2–14 while Saints finished 13–3.
2013	Rams; 27–16	Edward Jones Dome	Rams; 40–32	Final matchup in St. Louis.
2016	Saints; 49–21	Mercedes-Benz Superdome	Rams; 40–33	Rams return to Los Angeles. First starts in the series for Jared Goff and Aaron Donald.
2017	Rams; 26–20	Los Angeles Memorial Coliseum	Rams; 41–33	First matchup in Los Angeles since 1994.
2018	Saints; 45–35	Mercedes-Benz Superdome	Rams; 41–34	Saints’ win handed the Rams their first loss of the season after an 8–0 start. Both teams finished with 13–3 records, but the Saints secured home-field advantage throughout the NFC playoffs thanks to their head-to-head victory over the Rams.
2018 playoffs	Rams; 26–23(OT)	Mercedes-Benz Superdome	Rams; 42–34	NFC Championship, a controversial no-call occurs, known as the "NOLA No-Call". Rams lose Super Bowl LIII.
2019	Rams; 27–9	Los Angeles Memorial Coliseum	Rams; 43–34	Last start in the series for Drew Brees and Jared Goff.

2020s (Rams, 3–1)

Season	Results	Location	Overall series	Notes
2022	Saints; 27–20	Mercedes-Benz Superdome	Rams; 43–35	First start in the series for Matthew Stafford.
2023	Rams; 30–22	SoFi Stadium	Rams; 44–35	First matchup at SoFi Stadium in Inglewood, CA. Last start in the series for Aaron Donald.
2024	Rams; 21–14	Caesars Superdome	Rams; 45–35	
2025	Rams; 34–10	SoFi Stadium	Rams; 46–35	

Summary of Results

Season	Season series	at Los Angeles/St. Louis Rams	at New Orleans Saints	Notes
Regular season	Rams 45–34	Rams 25–16	Rams 20–18	Rams lead the series in Los Angeles 18–11; Rams won the series in St. Louis 7–5
Postseason	Tie 1–1	no games	Tie 1–1	NFC Wild Card: 2000; NFC Championship: 2018
Regular and postseason	Rams 46–35	Rams 25–16	Rams 21–19	
