= Pass interference =

Gridiron football foul

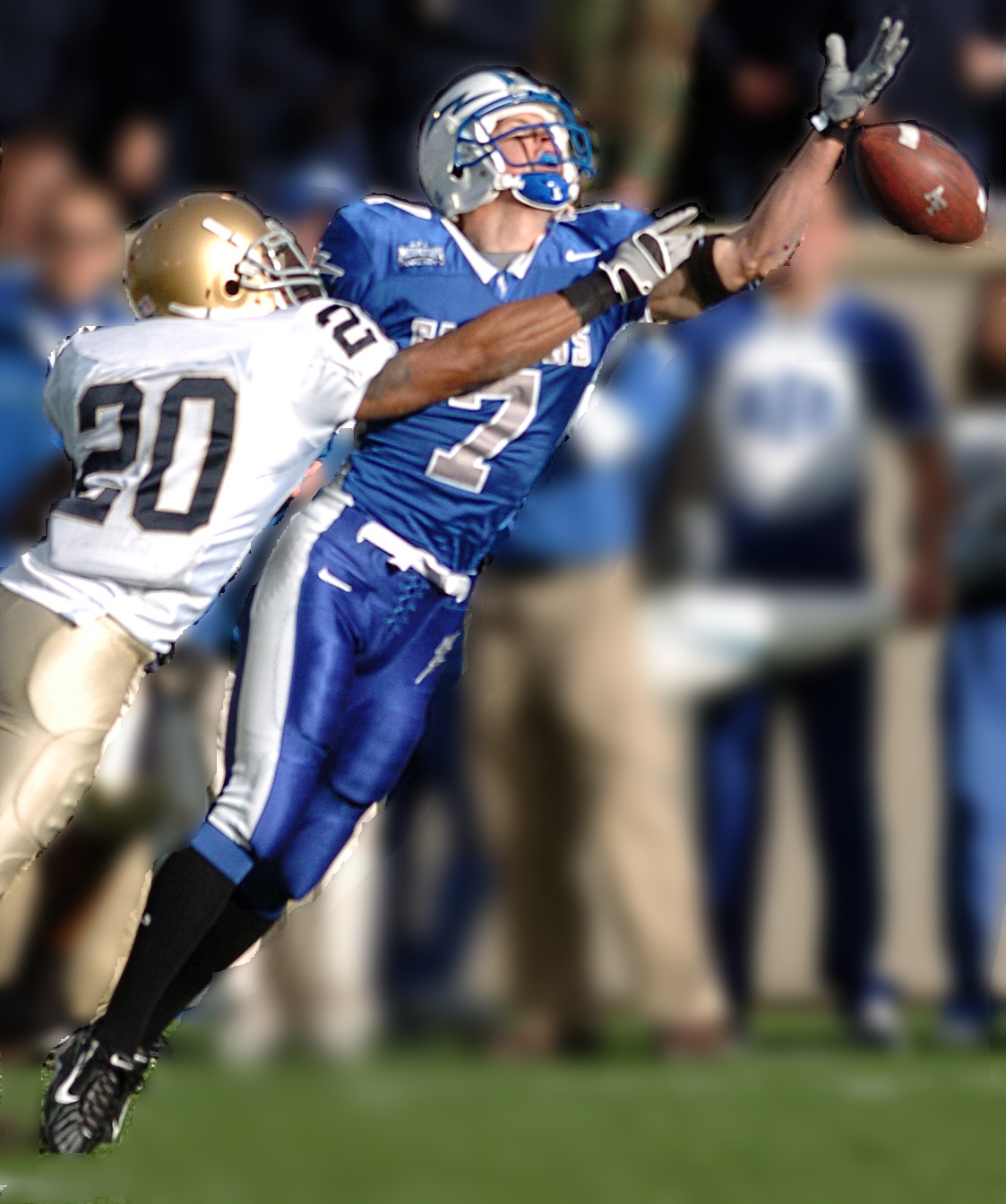
A defensive pass interference called on a Notre Dame defender (left), who has his arm around the chest of an Air Force receiver (right). The defender also has his hand on the arm of the receiver.

In American and Canadian football, pass interference (PI) is a foul that occurs when a player interferes with an eligible receiver's ability to make a fair attempt to catch a forward pass. Pass interference may include tripping, pushing, pulling, or cutting in front of the receiver, covering the receiver's face, or pulling on the receiver's hands or arms. It does not include catching or batting the ball before it reaches the receiver. Once the ball touches any defensive player or eligible offensive receiver, the above rules no longer apply and the defender may tackle the receiver or attempt to prevent them from gaining control of the ball. Once a forward pass is in the air it is a loose ball and thus any eligible receiver – all defensive players are eligible receivers – may try to catch it. When a defensive player catches a forward pass it is an interception and their team gains possession of the ball. Some actions that are defined as pass interference may be overlooked if the defender is attempting to catch or bat the ball rather than focusing on the receiver.

Players on the offense may also commit pass interference if they perform one of the above actions to prevent a defender from catching or making a play on the ball. The most common forms of offensive pass interference are when a receiver "pushes off" a defensive player to create separation, or a "pick play" in which a receiver deliberately obstructs the path of a defender who is covering another receiver. It is also offensive pass interference for a player to block more than one yard beyond the line of scrimmage before a pass is thrown, or to block a defender in the vicinity of the intended receiver when the pass is in the air.

== Variations ==
Rules for pass interference differ between American and Canadian football:

- Pass interference rules in American high school and college football clearly cover only forward passes that travel beyond the neutral zone. In the National Football League (NFL), the rule is that "there can be no pass interference at or behind the line of scrimmage". In Canadian football, pass interference rules are applied throughout the field of play. This leads to differences in the application of the rule on screen passes in which the intended receiver is behind the line of scrimmage:
  - A defender who makes contact with an intended receiver behind the line of scrimmage cannot be called for pass interference at any level of American football, although he may still be guilty of a different foul. The NFL is specific about which foul can be called in that situation, stating that "defensive actions [behind the line of scrimmage] such as tackling a receiver can still result in a 5-yard penalty for defensive holding, if accepted." In the same situation in Canadian football, the defender can be called for pass interference if his contact is deemed illegal.
  - Offensive pass interference cannot be called behind the line of scrimmage in American football. In Canadian football, although the pass interference rule applies, offensive players are explicitly allowed to interfere with a defender attempting to intercept a screen pass (within certain limitations).

In the NFL, the defender may make continuous contact with the receiver within the first five yards of the line of scrimmage. Anything after that is penalized as illegal contact. Pass interference is called if the defensive player contacts the offensive player while he is trying to catch the pass, unless the defender has turned his head to face the oncoming pass and is attempting to intercept it. Accidental, glancing contact is not penalized.

In high school and college, the defender may make contact with the receiver as long as the receiver is in front of the defender. These provisions end when the pass is in the air.

In the NFL, when a team presents a punt formation and before the ball is kicked, acts that normally constitute pass interference against the end man on the line of scrimmage or against an eligible receiver behind the line of scrimmage, who is aligned or in motion more than one yard outside the end man on the line, are not considered pass interference.

== Penalties ==
In the NFL and the Canadian Football League (CFL) the penalty for defensive pass interference is an automatic first down at the spot of the foul. If the foul occurs in the end zone, the ball is placed at the one-yard line (or half the distance to the goal if the line of scrimmage was inside the two-yard line). In U.S. college football and amateur Canadian football, the penalty is an automatic first down at the spot of the foul, up to a maximum of 15 yards from the previous spot. In U.S. high school rules the penalty for both offensive and defensive pass interference is 15 yards from the previous spot with the down replayed. Prior to 2013, the penalty for defensive pass interference also included an automatic first down while the penalty for offensive pass interference included a loss of down. In the NFL and CFL, the penalty for an offensive pass interference is 10 yards from the previous spot. In amateur Canadian football, the penalty is 15 yards.

In certain situations a defensive player deliberately commits pass interference against an intended receiver who would surely make a huge gain or score a touchdown were he to catch the ball. This is especially true in NCAA and amateur Canadian football, where the penalty for pass interference that occurs more than 15 yards upfield is less severe than under professional rules. In U.S. high school, if the covering official deems the interference intentional rather than incidental, 15 additional yards may be assessed (although this is seldom called).

== Controversy ==
The pass interference call is very subjective. It enforces fair play, allowing both receiver and defender equal opportunity to get the ball, but it creates a problem of degree of how much contact is allowed, especially for the defender.

In the NFL and NCAA , the impact of pass interference calls first dates back in the late 1970s – early 1980s when the Mel Blount rule was enforced. In modern times, football has shifted to be more offense oriented to keep the game appealing. The outcomes of several important games have been affected, such as the 2018 NFC Championship when Rams DB Nickell Robey-Coleman hit Tommylee Lewis of the Saints on a pass from Drew Brees. The no-call sent waves from fans across social media outlets. The call was made due to Brees's pass being non-catchable. The Rams went on to win that game to advance to Super Bowl LIII before falling to the Patriots. In the aftermath of the game the NFL considered experimenting with challenges of pass interference.

In Super Bowl LVII down the final stretch of the Chiefs game-winning drive, Eagles cornerback James Bradberry was flagged for pass interference on Chiefs receiver JuJu Smith-Schuster, allowing the Chiefs to milk down the clock and score a go-ahead field goal with minimal time on the clock for the Eagles, allowing the Chiefs to capture their 3rd Super Bowl in 4 seasons. The flag triggered mixed reactions from sports outlets and fans. But many analysts said this was the correct call. Eagles's DB Bradberry admitted that he tugged on the jersey of Smith Schuster.

== See also ==
- Blocking
