= 2000–01 NFL playoffs =

American football tournament

- Dates: December 30, 2000 – January 28, 2001
- Season: 2000
- Teams: 12
- Games played: 11
- Super Bowl XXXV site: Raymond James Stadium; Tampa, Florida
- Defending champions: St. Louis Rams
- Champion: Baltimore Ravens (1st title)
- Runner-up: New York Giants
- Conference runners-up: Minnesota Vikings; Oakland Raiders
NFL playoffs
| ← 1999–2000 | 2001–02 → |

The National Football League playoffs for the 2000 season began on December 30, 2000. The postseason tournament concluded with the Baltimore Ravens defeating the New York Giants in Super Bowl XXXV, 34–7, on January 28, 2001, at Raymond James Stadium in Tampa, Florida.

This was the final season in which the playoffs began in December. The following year, the league pushed the start of the season forward one week (to the weekend after Labor Day), which effectively pushed the start of the playoffs one week later (into January).

== Participants ==
Within each conference, the three division winners and the three non-division winners with the best overall regular season records qualified for the playoffs. The three division winners were seeded 1–3 based on the overall won-lost-tied record, and the three wild card teams were seeded 4–6. The NFL did not use a fixed bracket playoff system, and there were no restrictions regarding teams from the same division matching up in any round. In the first round, dubbed the wild-card playoffs or wild-card weekend, the third-seeded division winner hosted the sixth seed wild card, and the fourth seed hosted the fifth. The 1 and 2 seeds from each conference received a first-round bye. In the second round, the divisional playoffs, the number 1 seed hosted the worst-remaining seed from the first round (seed 4, 5, or 6), while the number 2 seed played the other team (seed 3, 4, or 5). The two winning teams from each conference's divisional playoff games then meet in the respective AFC and NFC Conference Championship games, hosted by the higher seed. Although the Super Bowl, the championship round of the playoffs, was played at a neutral site, the designated home team was based on an annual rotation by conference.

Playoff seeds
| Seed | AFC | NFC |
|---|---|---|
| 1 | Tennessee Titans (Central winner) | New York Giants (East winner) |
| 2 | Oakland Raiders (West winner) | Minnesota Vikings (Central winner) |
| 3 | Miami Dolphins (East winner) | New Orleans Saints (West winner) |
| 4 | Baltimore Ravens (wild card) | Philadelphia Eagles (wild card) |
| 5 | Denver Broncos (wild card) | Tampa Bay Buccaneers (wild card) |
| 6 | Indianapolis Colts (wild card) | St. Louis Rams (wild card) |

== Bracket ==
Dec 31 – PSINet Stadium | Jan 7 – Adelphia Coliseum
5 | Denver | 3
4 | Baltimore | 24
4 | Baltimore | 21 | Jan 14 – Network Associates Coliseum
1 | Tennessee | 10
AFC
Dec 30 – Pro Player Stadium | 4 | Baltimore | 16
Jan 6 – Network Associates Coliseum
2 | Oakland | 3
6 | Indianapolis | 17 | AFC Championship
3 | Miami | 0
3 | Miami | 23* | Jan 28 – Raymond James Stadium
2 | Oakland | 27
Wild-card round
Divisional round
Dec 30 – Louisiana Superdome | A4 | Baltimore | 34
Jan 6 – Hubert H. Humphrey Metrodome
N1 | NY Giants | 7
6 | St. Louis | 28 | Super Bowl XXXV
3 | New Orleans | 16
3 | New Orleans | 31 | Jan 14 – Giants Stadium
2 | Minnesota | 34
NFC
Dec 31 – Veterans Stadium | 2 | Minnesota | 0
Jan 7 – Giants Stadium
1 | NY Giants | 41
5 | Tampa Bay | 3 | NFC Championship
4 | Philadelphia | 10
4 | Philadelphia | 21
1 | NY Giants | 20

* Indicates overtime victory

== Schedule ==
This was the last time that all playoff games during the first three rounds were played at 12:30 p.m. and 4:00 p.m. EST. The following season, the NFL scheduled prime time playoff games for the first two rounds in an attempt to attract more television viewers.

In the United States, ABC broadcast the first two Wild Card playoff games. Fox then televised the rest of the NFC games. CBS broadcast the rest of the AFC playoff games and Super Bowl XXXV (their first Super Bowl broadcast since Super Bowl XXVI at the end of the 1991–92 playoffs).

| Round | Away team | Score | Home team | Date | Kickoff (ET / UTC−5) | TV |
|---|---|---|---|---|---|---|
| Wild-card round | Indianapolis Colts | 17–23 (OT) | Miami Dolphins | December 30, 2000 | 12:30 p.m. | ABC |
| Wild-card round | St. Louis Rams | 28–31 | New Orleans Saints | December 30, 2000 | 4:00 p.m. | ABC |
| Wild-card round | Denver Broncos | 3–21 | Baltimore Ravens | December 31, 2000 | 12:30 p.m. | CBS |
| Wild-card round | Tampa Bay Buccaneers | 3–21 | Philadelphia Eagles | December 31, 2000 | 4:00 p.m. | Fox |
| Divisional round | New Orleans Saints | 16–34 | Minnesota Vikings | January 6, 2001 | 12:30 p.m. | Fox |
| Divisional round | Miami Dolphins | 0–27 | Oakland Raiders | January 6, 2001 | 4:00 p.m. | CBS |
| Divisional round | Baltimore Ravens | 24–10 | Tennessee Titans | January 7, 2001 | 12:30 p.m. | CBS |
| Divisional round | Philadelphia Eagles | 10–20 | New York Giants | January 7, 2001 | 4:00 p.m. | Fox |
| Conference championships | Minnesota Vikings | 0–41 | New York Giants | January 14, 2001 | 12:30 p.m. | Fox |
| Conference championships | Baltimore Ravens | 16–3 | Oakland Raiders | January 14, 2001 | 4:00 p.m. | CBS |
| Super Bowl XXXV Raymond James Stadium Tampa, Florida | Baltimore Ravens | 34–7 | New York Giants | February 5, 2001 | 6:00 p.m. | CBS |

== Wild-card round ==
=== Saturday, December 30, 2000 ===
==== AFC: Miami Dolphins 23, Indianapolis Colts 17 (OT) ====
Indianapolis Colts vs. Miami Dolphins – Game summary

| Quarter | 1 | 2 | 3 | 4 | OT | Total |
|---|---|---|---|---|---|---|
| Colts | 3 | 11 | 0 | 3 | 0 | 17 |
| Dolphins | 0 | 0 | 7 | 10 | 6 | 23 |

at Pro Player Stadium, Miami, Florida

- Game time: 12:30 p.m. EST
- Game weather: 61 °F (16 °C), clear
- Game attendance: 73,193
- Referee: Jeff Triplette
- TV announcers (ABC): Mike Patrick (play-by-play), Joe Theismann, Paul Maguire (color commentators), and Solomon Wilcots (sideline reporter)

Game information

First quarter

- IND – Mike Vanderjagt 32-yard field goal, 7:49. Colts 3–0. Drive: 7 plays, 47 yards, 2:59.

Second quarter

- IND – Mike Vanderjagt 26-yard field goal, 9:33. Colts 6–0. Drive: 7 plays, 17 yards, 2:25.
- IND – Jerome Pathon 17-yard pass from Peyton Manning (Peyton Manning pass to Ken Dilger), 7:47. Colts 14–0. Drive: 2 plays, 18 yards, 0:47.

Third quarter

- MIA – Lamar Smith 2-yard run (Olindo Mare kick), 8:09. Colts 14–7. Drive: 11 plays, 70 yards, 6:51.

Fourth quarter

- MIA – Olindo Mare 38-yard field goal, 10:23. Colts 14–10. Drive: 9 plays, 53 yards, 5:02.
- IND – Mike Vanderjagt 50-yard field goal, 4:55. Colts 17–10. Drive: 9 plays, 45 yards, 5:28.
- MIA – Jed Weaver 9-yard pass from Jay Fiedler (Olindo Mare kick), 0:34. Tied 17–17. Drive: 14 plays, 80 yards, 4:21.

Overtime

- MIA – Lamar Smith 17-yard run, 3:34. Dolphins 23–17. Drive: 11 plays, 61 yards, 5:42.

Top passers

- IND – Peyton Manning – 17/32, 194 yards, TD
- MIA – Jay Fiedler – 19/34, 185 yards, TD, 3 INT

Top rushers

- IND – Edgerrin James – 21 rushes, 107 yards
- MIA – Lamar Smith – 40 rushes, 209 yards, 2 TD

Top receivers

- IND – Jerome Pathon – 5 receptions, 69 yards, TD
- MIA – O. J. McDuffie – 4 receptions, 57 yards

The Dolphins overcame three first half turnovers as running back Lamar Smith set a playoff record with 40 carries for 209 yards, including the game-winning 17-yard touchdown run in overtime. He also caught 3 passes for 18 yards.

After the Dolphins threw an incomplete pass on 4th and 6 from the Colts 39-yard line, Colts quarterback Peyton Manning's 25-yard completion to tight end Jerome Pathon set up the first score of the game on a 32-yard field goal by kicker Mike Vanderjagt. Miami threatened to score late in the first quarter, but quarterback Jay Fiedler's pass in the end zone was intercepted by Indianapolis safety Chad Cota. On the next play, running back Edgerrin James broke off a 34-yard run, but the drive stalled and the Colts had to punt. After that, Colts defensive end Chad Bratzke gave his team another great scoring opportunity when he intercepted Fiedler's screen pass at the Dolphins 25-yard line. But Indianapolis failed to reach the end zone and had to settle for another field goal from Vanderjagt. On Miami's ensuing drive, they committed their third consecutive turnover when Cota picked off another pass and returned it 23 yards to the Dolphins 18-yard line. This time, the Colts made it into the end zone with Manning's 17-yard touchdown pass to Pathon with 7:47 left in the second quarter. He followed it up with a successful two-point conversion pass to tight end Ken Dilger. Miami responded with a drive to the Colts 20-yard line, only to have Olindo Mare miss a 38-yard field goal attempt with 31 seconds left in the half. Despite their sluggish start, Indianapolis had complete control of the game by the end of the first half, leading 14–0. Meanwhile, Fiedler completed only five of 14 passes for 42 yards.

But Fiedler improved in the second half, completing 14 of 20 passes for 143 yards and rushing for 43 yards. The Dolphins took the opening kickoff and marched 70 yards in 11 plays. Smith carried the ball 7 times for 42 yards on the drive and finished it off with a 2-yard touchdown run to cut the lead in half. In the fourth quarter, an 11-yard run by Fiedler and a 19-yard run by Smith set up a 38-yard field goal from Mare, making the score 14–10. But Manning led the Colts back, completing a 13-yard pass to Marcus Pollard, a 38-yard pass to Marvin Harrison, and an 18-yard pass to Pathon. Then a 16-yard run by James moved the ball into Dolphins territory, and Vanderjagt finished the drive with a 50-yard field goal to give the Colts a 17–10 lead. Miami responded with a 14-play, 80-yard scoring drive. With 34 seconds left in regulation, Fiedler's 9-yard touchdown pass to Jed Weaver sent the game into overtime.

The Dolphins won the toss in overtime, but after a holding penalty they were forced to punt, and the Colts advanced into Miami territory. Faced with third down and 12 from the Dolphins 42-yard line, Manning completed an 11-yard pass to Marvin Harrison. The Dolphins were offside on the play, but the Colts elected to decline the penalty and attempt a 49-yard field goal to win the game. However, Vanderjagt's kick was wide right. The Dolphins then marched 61 yards in 11 plays, ending with Smith's game-winning touchdown.

Manning threw for 197 yards and a touchdown. James rushed for 107 yards and caught three passes for 33.

To date, this is the Dolphins' most recent playoff victory and they now have the longest playoff win drought in the league.

This was the second postseason meeting between the Colts and Dolphins. Miami won the only previous meeting while the Colts were in Baltimore.

Previous playoff games
Miami leads 1–0 in all-time playoff games

1971

Baltimore Colts 0 @ Miami Dolphins 21

1971 AFC Championship Game

==== NFC: New Orleans Saints 31, St. Louis Rams 28 ====
St. Louis Rams vs. New Orleans Saints – Game summary

| Quarter | 1 | 2 | 3 | 4 | Total |
|---|---|---|---|---|---|
| Rams | 7 | 0 | 0 | 21 | 28 |
| Saints | 0 | 10 | 7 | 14 | 31 |

at Louisiana Superdome, New Orleans, Louisiana

- Game time: 4:00 p.m. EST/3:00 p.m. CST
- Game weather: Played indoors, domed stadium
- Game attendance: 64,900
- Referee: Gerald Austin
- TV announcers (ABC): Al Michaels (play-by-play), Dan Fouts, Dennis Miller (color commentators), Melissa Stark, and Eric Dickerson (sideline reporters)

Game information

First quarter

- STL – Isaac Bruce 17-yard pass from Kurt Warner (Jeff Wilkins kick), 5:58. Rams 7–0. Drive: 11 plays, 68 yards, 6:55.

Second quarter

- NO – Robert Wilson 12-yard pass from Aaron Brooks (Doug Brien kick), 14:56. Tied 7–7. Drive: 11 plays, 70 yards, 6:02.
- NO – Doug Brien 33-yard field goal, 1:30. Saints 10–7. Drive: 4 plays, 5 yards, 0:51.

Third quarter

- NO – Willie Jackson 10-yard pass from Aaron Brooks (Doug Brien kick), 8:40. Saints 17–7. Drive: 7 plays, 45 yards, 3:23.

Fourth quarter

- NO – Willie Jackson 49-yard pass from Aaron Brooks (Doug Brien kick), 13:22. Saints 24–7. Drive: 5 plays, 74 yards, 2:55.
- NO – Willie Jackson 16-yard pass from Aaron Brooks (Doug Brien kick), 11:57. Saints 31–7. Drive: 1 play, 16 yards, 0:05.
- STL – Ricky Proehl 17-yard pass from Kurt Warner (Jeff Wilkins kick), 9:36. Saints 31–14. Drive: 4 plays, 80 yards, 2:21.
- STL – Marshall Faulk 25-yard pass from Kurt Warner (Jeff Wilkins kick), 3:52. Saints 31–21. Drive: 3 plays, 62 yards, 0:48.
- STL – Kurt Warner 5-yard run (Jeff Wilkins kick), 2:36. Saints 31–28. Drive: 5 plays, 47 yards, 1:07.

Top passers

- STL – Kurt Warner – 24/40, 365 yards, 3 TD, 3 INT
- NO – Aaron Brooks – 16/29, 266 yards, 4 TD, INT

Top rushers

- STL – Marshall Faulk – 14 rushes, 24 yards
- NO – Terry Allen – 16 rushes, 21 yards

Top receivers

- STL – Isaac Bruce – 7 receptions, 127 yards, TD
- NO – Willie Jackson – 6 receptions, 142 yards, 3 TD

The Saints, who were 3–13 the previous year, won their first playoff game in their 34-year history with quarterback Aaron Brooks' 266 passing yards and four touchdowns, holding off the defending champion Rams, who scored three touchdowns in the final quarter. Rams quarterback Kurt Warner committed four turnovers (three interceptions and a fumble), while running back Marshall Faulk, who shredded the Saints with 220 rushing yards during their encounter in the regular season, was held to a season-low 24 yards on the ground.

St. Louis scored on their opening drive, marching 68 yards in 11 plays to take a 7–0 lead with Warner's 17-yard touchdown pass to Isaac Bruce. But New Orleans then scored 31 unanswered points, beginning with an 11-play, 70-yard drive that ended with Brooks' 12-yard touchdown pass to Robert Wilson on their opening drive. They appeared to suffer a setback when Brooks' 50-yard completion to Willie Jackson on their next drive was nullified by Devin Bush's interception a few plays later. But after several punts, Sammy Knight's 52-yard interception return to the Rams 20-yard line set up kicker Doug Brien's 33-yard field goal to give the Saints a 10–7 lead at halftime.

Early in the third quarter, Chris Oldham's interception gave New Orleans the ball at the Rams 45-yard line, setting up Brooks' 10-yard touchdown pass to Jackson that increased their lead to 17–7. Early in the fourth quarter, the Saints drove 74 yards in five plays and scored with Brooks' 49-yard touchdown pass to Jackson. Then on the Rams ensuing drive, defensive end Willie Whitehead forced a fumble while sacking Warner that defensive tackle La'Roi Glover recovered on the Rams 16-yard line, and Brooks threw a 16-yard touchdown pass to Jackson on the next play, giving the Saints a 31–7 lead with 11:57 remaining.

But St. Louis stormed back, as Warner completed two passes to Faulk for 55 yards before throwing a 17-yard touchdown pass to Ricky Proehl, cutting the deficit to 31–13 after the two-point conversion failed. With 6:28 left in the game, St. Louis had the ball inside the New Orleans 10-yard line but Knight recorded his second interception to halt the drive. However, the Saints were forced to punt and the Rams marched 62 yards on just three plays to score on Faulk's 25-yard touchdown reception to make it 31–20 with 3:52 left. Rams cornerback Dré Bly recovered the ensuing onside kick. Two plays later on third down and 6, Warner completed a 38-yard pass to Az-Zahir Hakim at the Saints 5-yard line before he took the ball into the end zone himself with a 5-yard touchdown run. Faulk's reception on the two-point conversion made it 31–28 with 2:36 left. St. Louis failed to recover their second onside kick attempt but forced New Orleans to punt. However, the punt was muffed by Hakim, and the Saints' Brian Milne recovered the ball to seal the victory.

Jackson caught six passes for 142 yards and three touchdowns, tying a playoff record set by Jerry Rice in Super Bowl XXIX. Warner finished the game with 365 passing yards and three touchdowns, but was intercepted three times. Bruce caught seven passes for 127 yards and a touchdown, while Faulk added seven catches for 99 yards and a touchdown.

The Monday Night Football crew returned to the Superdome a year later to cover a regular season game between these teams, which the Rams won 34–21. It was their last game as division rivals, as the Saints moved to the NFC South in 2002.

This was the first postseason meeting between the Rams and Saints.

=== Sunday, December 31, 2000 ===
==== AFC: Baltimore Ravens 21, Denver Broncos 3 ====
Denver Broncos vs. Baltimore Ravens – Game summary

| Quarter | 1 | 2 | 3 | 4 | Total |
|---|---|---|---|---|---|
| Broncos | 0 | 3 | 0 | 0 | 3 |
| Ravens | 0 | 14 | 7 | 0 | 21 |

at PSINet Stadium, Baltimore, Maryland

- Game time: 12:30 p.m. EST
- Game weather: 37 °F (3 °C), clear, windy
- Game attendance: 69,638
- Referee: Larry Nemmers
- TV announcers (CBS): Greg Gumbel (play-by-play), Phil Simms (color commentator), and Armen Keteyian (sideline reporter)

Game information

First quarter

- No scoring plays.

Second quarter

- BAL – Jamal Lewis 1-yard run (Matt Stover Kick), 11:43. Ravens 7–0. Drive: 10 plays, 75 yards, 5:51.
- DEN – Jason Elam 31-yard field goal, 4:31. Ravens 7–3. Drive: 12 plays, 68 yards, 7:12.
- BAL – Shannon Sharpe 58-yard pass from Trent Dilfer (Matt Stover kick), 4:06. Ravens 14–3. Drive: 1 play, 58 yards, 0:25.

Third quarter

- BAL – Jamal Lewis 27-yard run (Matt Stover kick), 3:19. Ravens 21–3. Drive: 2 plays, 28 yards, 0:42.

Fourth quarter

- No scoring plays.

Top passers

- DEN – Gus Frerotte – 13/28, 124 yards, INT
- BAL – Trent Dilfer – 9/14, 130 yards, TD

Top rushers

- DEN – Mike Anderson – 15 rushes, 40 yards
- BAL – Jamal Lewis – 30 rushes, 110 yards, 2 TD

Top receivers

- DEN – Ed McCaffrey – 8 receptions, 75 yards
- BAL – Qadry Ismail – 4 receptions, 35 yards

The Ravens defense held the Broncos' offense to only 177 total yards, 42 rushing yards, nine first downs, and three points. Baltimore also recorded five sacks and held running back and Rookie of the Year Mike Anderson, who rushed for nearly 1,500 yards during the season, to 40 yards on 15 carries.

Baltimore got an early scoring chance when Ray Lewis intercepted a pass from Denver quarterback Gus Frerotte on the Broncos 39-yard line. But the team could only get to the 34 and ended up punting. After several punts, Baltimore drove 75 yards in 10 plays, including a 20-yard run by Jamal Lewis, to go up 7–0 on Lewis' 1-yard touchdown run on the last play of the first quarter.

Denver responded as Frerotte completed four passes for 59 yards on a 68-yard drive that ended with a 31-yard field goal from Jason Elam with 4:31 remaining in the first half to cut the lead to 7–3. But on the Ravens' next drive, Trent Dilfer threw a pass that was bobbled by Lewis, deflected by cornerback Terrell Buckley, and ended up in the arms of tight end Shannon Sharpe, who took it 58 yards for a touchdown.

In the third quarter, Ravens receiver Jermaine Lewis returned a punt 17 yards to the Broncos 28-yard line, setting up the final score of the game, a 27-yard touchdown run by Jamal Lewis. He finished the game with 110 rushing yards, one reception for 15 yards, and two touchdowns.

This was the first time the Broncos were prevented from scoring a touchdown in 28 postseason games over a span of three decades.

This was the first postseason meeting between the Broncos and Ravens.

==== NFC: Philadelphia Eagles 21, Tampa Bay Buccaneers 3 ====
Tampa Bay Buccaneers vs. Philadelphia Eagles – Game summary

| Quarter | 1 | 2 | 3 | 4 | Total |
|---|---|---|---|---|---|
| Buccaneers | 0 | 3 | 0 | 0 | 3 |
| Eagles | 0 | 14 | 0 | 7 | 21 |

at Veterans Stadium, Philadelphia, Pennsylvania

- Game time: 4:00 p.m. EST
- Game weather: 35 °F (2 °C), cloudy
- Game attendance: 65,813
- Referee: Mike Carey
- TV announcers (Fox): Pat Summerall (play-by-play), John Madden (color commentator), and D. J. Johnson (sideline reporter)

Game information

First quarter

- No scoring plays.

Second quarter

- TB – Martín Gramática 29-yard field goal, 10:16. Buccaneers 3–0. Drive: 8 plays, 58 yards, 3:49.
- PHI – Donovan McNabb 5-yard run (David Akers kick), 3:21. Eagles 7–3. Drive: 4 plays, 15 yards, 0:59.
- PHI – Na Brown 5-yard pass from Donovan McNabb (David Akers kick), 0:12. Eagles 14–3. Drive: 8 plays, 69 yards, 1:31.

Third quarter

- No scoring plays.

Fourth quarter

- PHI – Jeff Thomason 2-yard pass from Donovan McNabb (David Akers kick), 14:13. Eagles 21–3. Drive: 9 plays, 57 yards, 5:20.

Top passers

- TB – Shaun King – 17/31, 171 yards
- PHI – Donovan McNabb – 24/33, 161 yards, 2 TD, INT

Top rushers

- TB – Mike Alstott – 7 rushes, 42 yards
- PHI – Chris Warren – 22 rushes, 85 yards

Top receivers

- TB – Keyshawn Johnson – 6 receptions, 106 yards
- PHI – Charles Johnson – 5 receptions, 47 yards

The Eagles defense held the Bucs to only 199 total yards and 11 first downs.

After the first six drives of the game ended in punts, Buccaneers fullback Mike Alstott rushed for 18 yards and caught a pass for eight yards as the team drove 58 yards in eight plays to score on Martín Gramática's 29-yard field goal early in the second quarter. But late in the quarter, Eagles defensive end Hugh Douglas forced Tampa Bay quarterback Shaun King to fumble, and the ball was recovered by linebacker Mike Mamula at the Buccaneers 15-yard line, setting up Philadelphia quarterback Donovan McNabb's 5-yard touchdown run. Tampa Bay punted on their next possession and the Eagles marched 69 yards on eight plays to take a 14–3 lead on Na Brown's 5-yard touchdown reception with 12 seconds left in the half.

The Eagles opening drive of the second half consumed over eight minutes. It ended with no points because of a missed field goal attempt by David Akers, but the team got the ball back with good field position after receiving Mark Royals' 27-yard punt on their own 43-yard line. Philadelphia then drove 57 yards in eight plays to go up 21–3 on the third play of the fourth quarter with McNabb's 2-yard touchdown pass to Jeff Thomason. Meanwhile, Tampa Bay's final two drives of the game both resulted in turnovers on downs.

This was the second postseason meeting between the Buccaneers and Eagles. Tampa Bay won the only prior meeting.

Previous playoff games
Tampa Bay leads 1–0 in all-time playoff games

1979

Philadelphia Eagles 17 @ Tampa Bay Buccaneers 24

1979 NFC Divisional playoffs

== Divisional round ==
=== Saturday, January 6, 2001 ===
==== NFC: Minnesota Vikings 34, New Orleans Saints 16 ====
New Orleans Saints vs. Minnesota Vikings – Game summary

| Quarter | 1 | 2 | 3 | 4 | Total |
|---|---|---|---|---|---|
| Saints | 3 | 0 | 7 | 6 | 16 |
| Vikings | 10 | 7 | 10 | 7 | 34 |

at Hubert H. Humphrey Metrodome, Minneapolis, Minnesota

- Game time: 12:30 p.m. EST/11:30 a.m. CST
- Game weather: Played indoors, domed stadium
- Game attendance: 63,881
- Referee: Walt Coleman
- TV announcers (Fox): Dick Stockton (play-by-play), Matt Millen (color commentator), and Pam Oliver (sideline reporter)

Game information

First quarter

- MIN – Randy Moss 53-yard pass from Daunte Culpepper (Gary Anderson kick), 11:57. Vikings 7–0. Drive: 3 plays, 64 yards, 1:20.
- NO – Doug Brien 33-yard field goal, 7:46. Vikings 7–3. Drive: 10 plays, 65 yards, 4:11.
- MIN – Gary Anderson 24-yard field goal, 1:36. Vikings 10–3. Drive: 12 plays, 67 yards, 6:10.

Second quarter

- MIN – Cris Carter 17-yard pass from Daunte Culpepper (Gary Anderson kick), 1:29. Vikings 17–3. Drive: 7 plays, 73 yards, 3:40.

Third quarter

- MIN – Randy Moss 68-yard pass from Daunte Culpepper (Gary Anderson kick), 13:33. Vikings 24–3. Drive: 3 plays, 77 yards, 1:27.
- NO – Dave Stachelski 2-yard pass from Aaron Brooks (Doug Brien kick), 9:33. Vikings 24–10. Drive: 8 plays, 83 yards, 4:00.
- MIN – Gary Anderson 44-yard field goal, 4:31. Vikings 27–10. Drive: 10 plays, 50 yards, 5:02.

Fourth quarter

- MIN – Robert Smith 2-yard run (Gary Anderson kick), 10:46. Vikings 34–10. Drive: 8 plays, 29 yards, 4:32.
- NO – Willie Jackson 48-yard pass from Aaron Brooks (pass failed), 2:19. Vikings 34–16. Drive: 3 plays, 66 yards, 0:58.

Top passers

- NO – Aaron Brooks – 30/48, 295 yards, 2 TD, 2 INT
- MIN – Daunte Culpepper – 17/31, 302 yards, 3 TD

Top rushers

- NO – Aaron Brooks – 5 rushes, 29 yards
- MIN – Robert Smith – 25 rushes, 74 yards, TD

Top receivers

- NO – Willie Jackson – 9 receptions, 125 yards, TD
- MIN – Randy Moss – 2 receptions, 121 yards, 2 TD

Quarterback Daunte Culpepper led the Vikings to victory with 305 passing yards and three touchdowns, without being sacked or throwing any interceptions.

Culpepper threw a 53-yard touchdown pass to wide receiver Randy Moss on the game's third play from scrimmage. New Orleans responded by driving 65 yards in 10 plays, boosted by a 40-yard pass interference penalty against cornerback Wasswa Serwanga. Doug Brien finished the drive with a 33-yard field goal to make the score 7–3. Minnesota then ran off a 10-play, 65-yard drive of their own, the longest gain a 34-yard completion from Culpepper to Cris Carter. With less than two minutes left in the first quarter, Gary Anderson finished it with a 24-yard field goal that put the Vikings up 10–3.

The scoring pace slowed down in the second quarter, as the first five possessions ended in punts. With time running out in the half, Culpepper ripped off a 30-yard gain on a QB scramble, and then threw a 17-yard touchdown pass to Carter on the next play, giving the team a 17–3 lead going into halftime. Then on the 3rd play of the 3rd quarter, they went up 24–3 on Culpepper's 68-yard touchdown pass to Moss.

The Saints responded with quarterback Aaron Brooks completing 7 consecutive passes for 85 yards, the last a 2-yard touchdown pass to rookie tight end Dave Stachelski, his first career NFL touchdown. But the Vikings scored again on their next drive, moving the ball 50 yards (25 of them on a carry by Robert Smith) and taking a 27–10 lead on Anderson's 44-yard field goal. Then on the second to last play of the quarter, Robert Tate's interception of a Brooks pass gave the Vikings a first down on the Saints 29-yard line, and they went on to clinch the game with Smith's 2-yard touchdown run. After that, all the Saints could muster was a meaningless 48-yard touchdown pass from Brooks to receiver Willie Jackson with 2:28 left on the clock.

The 35-year-old Carter had the best postseason performance of his career, catching eight passes for a career-high 120 yards and a touchdown, while Moss recorded 121 yards and two touchdowns on just two receptions. Jackson caught nine passes for 124 yards and a touchdown in the final postseason game of his career. Smith rushed for 74 yards and a touchdown, while also catching 2 passes for 25. Brooks completed 30 of 48 passes for 295 yards and two touchdowns, but was sacked and intercepted twice. Saints running back Chad Morton tied a playoff record with 13 receptions for 106 yards.

This was the second postseason meeting between the Saints and Vikings. Minnesota won the only prior meeting.

Previous playoff games
Minnesota leads 1–0 in all-time playoff games

1987

Minnesota Vikings 44 @ New Orleans Saints 10

1987 NFC Wild Card playoffs

==== AFC: Oakland Raiders 27, Miami Dolphins 0 ====
Miami Dolphins vs. Oakland Raiders – Game summary

| Quarter | 1 | 2 | 3 | 4 | Total |
|---|---|---|---|---|---|
| Dolphins | 0 | 0 | 0 | 0 | 0 |
| Raiders | 10 | 10 | 7 | 0 | 27 |

at Network Associates Coliseum, Oakland, California

- Game time: 4:00 p.m. EST/1:00 p.m. PST
- Game weather: 59 °F (15 °C), clear
- Game attendance: 61,998
- Referee: Phil Luckett
- TV announcers (CBS): Greg Gumbel (play-by-play), Phil Simms (color commentator), and Armen Keteyian (sideline reporter)

Game information

First quarter

- OAK – Tory James 90-yard interception return (Sebastian Janikowski kick), 11:36. Raiders 7–0.
- OAK – Sebastian Janikowski 36-yard field goal, 4:52. Raiders 10–0. Drive: 8 plays, 46 yards, 4:44.

Second quarter

- OAK – Sebastian Janikowski 33-yard field goal, 8:36. Raiders 13–0. Drive: 12 plays, 78 yards, 7:15.
- OAK – James Jett 6-yard pass from Rich Gannon (Sebastian Janikowski kick), 1:53. Raiders 20–0. Drive: 9 plays, 43 yards, 4:14.

Third quarter

- OAK – Tyrone Wheatley 2-yard run (Sebastian Janikowski kick), 5:56. Raiders 27–0. Drive: 12 plays, 54 yards, 6:50.

Fourth quarter

- No scoring plays

Top passers

- MIA – Jay Fiedler – 18/37, 176 yards, 3 INT
- OAK – Rich Gannon – 12/18, 143 yards, TD

Top rushers

- MIA – Autry Denson – 3 rushes, 12 yards
- OAK – Tyrone Wheatley – 19 rushes, 56 yards, TD

Top receivers

- MIA – O. J. McDuffie – 3 receptions, 43 yards
- OAK – Terry Kirby – 2 receptions, 35 yards

The Raiders scored 20 points in the first half, recorded 140 rushing yards, and forced four turnovers to shut out the Dolphins in their first home playoff game in Oakland since 1980 (having moved back from Los Angeles six years earlier). In the first quarter, Miami threatened to score first with a drive to Oakland's 17-yard line, but Tory James intercepted quarterback Jay Fiedler's pass and returned it 90 yards for a touchdown. After a Dolphins punt, Oakland drove 41 yards in 10 plays to score on Sebastian Janikowski's 36-yard field goal. The next time they got the ball, Oakland advanced 78 yards, featuring a 32-yard completion from Rich Gannon to running back Terry Kirby, and scored on Jankikowski's 33-yard field goal to go up 13–0 early in the second quarter.

Later on in the game, Tory James forced a fumble from Lamar Smith that was recovered by Raiders cornerback Charles Woodson on the Miami 43-yard line. This led to Gannon's 6-yard touchdown pass to James Jett, giving the Raiders a 20–0 lead going into halftime.

The Dolphins had to punt after three plays on the opening possession of the second half, and Darrien Gordon returned Matt Turk's 39-yard kick 24 yards to the Oakland 46-yard line. The Raiders then drove 54 yards in 12 plays to make the score 27–0 on Tyrone Wheatley's 2-yard touchdown run. The next time Miami had the ball, they turned it over on downs at the Raiders 37. In the fourth quarter, Oakland finished off the Dolphins by intercepting Fiedler twice, one by James and the other by Eric Allen.

Gannon completed 12 of 18 passes for 141 yards and a touchdown, while also rushing for 31 yards. Miami running back Autry Denson had 5 kickoff returns for 116 yards.

This was the fourth postseason meeting between the Dolphins and Raiders. Oakland won two of the previous three meetings.

Previous playoff games
Oakland leads 2–1 in all-time playoff games

1970

Miami Dolphins 14 @ Oakland Raiders 21

1970 AFC Divisional playoffs

1973

Oakland Raiders 10 @ Miami Dolphins 27

1973 AFC Championship Game

1974

Miami Dolphins 26 @ Oakland Raiders 28

1974 AFC Divisional playoffs

=== Sunday, January 7, 2001 ===
==== AFC: Baltimore Ravens 24, Tennessee Titans 10 ====
Baltimore Ravens vs. Tennessee Titans – Game summary

| Quarter | 1 | 2 | 3 | 4 | Total |
|---|---|---|---|---|---|
| Ravens | 0 | 7 | 3 | 14 | 24 |
| Titans | 7 | 0 | 3 | 0 | 10 |

at Adelphia Coliseum, Nashville, Tennessee

- Game time: 12:30 p.m. EST/11:30 a.m. CST
- Game weather: 55 °F (13 °C), cloudy
- Game attendance: 68,527
- Referee: Bernie Kukar
- TV announcers (CBS): Dick Enberg (play-by-play), Dan Dierdorf (color commentator), and Bonnie Bernstein (sideline reporter)

Game information

First quarter

- TEN – Eddie George 2-yard run (Al Del Greco Kick), 7:43. Titans 7–0. Drive: 11 plays, 68 yards, 7:17.

Second quarter

- BAL – Jamal Lewis 1-yard run (Matt Stover Kick), 9:46. Tied 7–7. Drive: 4 plays, 57 yards, 1:36.

Third quarter

- TEN – Al Del Greco 21-yard field goal, 8:14. Titans 10–7. Drive: 8 plays, 24 yards, 4:23.
- BAL – Matt Stover 38-yard field goal, 3:05. Tied 10–10. Drive: 6 plays, 25 yards, 2:34.

Fourth quarter

- BAL – Anthony Mitchell 90-yard blocked field goal return (Matt Stover kick), 12:12. Ravens 17–10.
- BAL – Ray Lewis 50-yard interception return (Matt Stover kick), 6:41. Ravens 24–10.

Top passers

- BAL – Trent Dilfer – 5/16, 117 yards
- TEN – Steve McNair – 24/46, 176 yards, INT

Top rushers

- BAL – Jamal Lewis – 17 rushes, 47 yards, TD
- TEN – Eddie George – 27 rushes, 91 yards, TD

Top receivers

- BAL – Qadry Ismail – 3 receptions, 53 yards
- TEN – Eddie George – 8 receptions, 52 yards

Even though they had only 134 yards of total offense and six first downs, with quarterback Trent Dilfer completing just five of 16 passes, the Ravens broke a 10–10 tie in the fourth quarter with Anthony Mitchell's 90-yard blocked field goal touchdown return and Ray Lewis' 50-yard interception touchdown return.

The Titans scored first on the game's opening drive after marching 68 yards in 11 plays to reach the end zone on running back Eddie George's 2-yard touchdown run. But Baltimore tied the game early in the second quarter after Dilfer's 56-yard pass to Shannon Sharpe set up running back Jamal Lewis' 1-yard touchdown run. Tennessee kicker Al Del Greco attempted two field goals before halftime, but his 45-yard try was blocked and he missed a 31-yard attempt.

The teams then traded field goals in the third quarter, with Tennessee getting their field goal following a blocked punt. Early in the fourth quarter, Del Greco's field goal attempt was blocked, Mitchell caught the ball, and ran 90 yards to the end zone to give the Ravens a 17–10 lead. The Titans reached midfield with 6:55 remaining, but Steve McNair’s pass ricocheted off of Eddie George's hands, then into the hands of Ray Lewis for the interception, who then returned it 50 yards for a touchdown to seal the victory for Baltimore.

This was the first postseason meeting between the Ravens and Titans.

==== NFC: New York Giants 20, Philadelphia Eagles 10 ====
Philadelphia Eagles vs. New York Giants – Game summary

| Quarter | 1 | 2 | 3 | 4 | Total |
|---|---|---|---|---|---|
| Eagles | 0 | 3 | 0 | 7 | 10 |
| Giants | 7 | 10 | 0 | 3 | 20 |

at Giants Stadium, East Rutherford, New Jersey

- Game time: 4:00 p.m. EST
- Game weather: 42 °F (6 °C), cloudy
- Game attendance: 78,765
- Referee: Ed Hochuli
- TV announcers (Fox): Pat Summerall (play-by-play), John Madden (color commentator), and D. J. Johnson (sideline reporter)

Game information

First quarter

- NYG – Ron Dixon 97-yard kickoff return (Brad Daluiso kick), 14:43. Giants 7–0.

Second quarter

- NYG – Brad Daluiso 37-yard field goal, 14:55. Giants 10–0. Drive: 6 plays, 14 yards, 2:19.
- NYG – Jason Sehorn 32-yard interception return (Brad Daluiso kick), 1:40. Giants 17–0.
- PHI – David Akers 28-yard field goal, 0:26. Giants 17–3. Drive: 7 plays, 40 yards, 1:14.

Third quarter

- No scoring plays.

Fourth quarter

- NYG – Brad Daluiso 25-yard field goal, 8:41. Giants 20–3. Drive: 13 plays, 88 yards, 8:11.
- PHI – Torrance Small 10-yard pass from Donovan McNabb (David Akers kick), 1:56. Giants 20–10 Drive: 3 plays, 8 yards, 0:25.

Top passers

- PHI – Donovan McNabb – 20/41, 181 yards, TD, INT
- NYG – Kerry Collins – 12/19, 125 yards

Top rushers

- PHI – Brian Mitchell – 3 rushes, 18 yards
- NYG – Ron Dayne – 17 rushes, 53 yards

Top receivers

- PHI – Charles Johnson – 5 receptions, 53 yards
- NYG – Pete Mitchell – 2 receptions, 47 yards

The Eagles never recovered after the Giants' Ron Dixon returned the opening kickoff 97 yards for a touchdown. For the rest of the game, they gained only 186 yards and scored 10 points, despite forcing three turnovers. New York also recorded six sacks.

Philadelphia failed to get a first down on their first three possessions. Then on the Eagles fourth drive, Torrance Small fumbled while being tackled by Shaun Williams, and Dave Thomas recovered the loose ball for New York on the Eagles 34-yard line to set up Brad Daluiso's 37-yard field goal.

Late in the second quarter, Eagles quarterback Donovan McNabb lost a fumble while being sacked by Michael Strahan, which New York lineman Cedric Jones recovered on the Philadelphia 15. Two players later, the Eagles got the ball back when Damon Moore forced and recovered a fumble from running back Tiki Barber. But the ensuing drive lasted barely a minute before cornerback Jason Sehorn made a diving interception from McNabb, then got back up and returned it 32 yards for a touchdown to increase the Giants lead to 17–0. The Eagles finally caught a break when Brian Mitchell returned the following kickoff 34 yards to midfield, after which McNabb's 21-yard completion to receiver Charles Johnson set up David Akers' 28-yard field goal before halftime, making the score 17–3.

In the third quarter the Eagles drove 75 yards to the New York 12-yard line, only to have Akers miss a 30-yard field goal attempt. After a few punts, New York drove 88 yards in 13 plays, including a 33-yard completion from Kerry Collins to tight end Pete Mitchell. Brad Daluiso finished the drive with a 25-yard field goal that gave New York a 20–3 lead on the last play of the quarter.

Late in the fourth quarter the Eagles blocked a Giants punt. New York receiver Amani Toomer recovered it, but then fumbled the ball, and Luther Broughton recovered it for the Eagles on the Giants 8-yard line. Philadelphia then scored with McNabb's 10-yard touchdown pass to Small, making the score 20–10, but their subsequent onside kick failed and the Giants held the ball for the rest of the game.

Strahan finished the game with 4 tackles, 2 sacks, and a forced fumble.

This was the second postseason meeting between the Eagles and Giants. New York won the only prior meeting.

Previous playoff games
New York leads 1–0 in all-time playoff games

1981

New York Giants 27 @ Philadelphia Eagles 21

1981 NFC Wild Card playoffs

== Conference championships ==
=== Sunday, January 14, 2001 ===
==== NFC: New York Giants 41, Minnesota Vikings 0 ====
Minnesota Vikings vs. New York Giants – Game summary

| Quarter | 1 | 2 | 3 | 4 | Total |
|---|---|---|---|---|---|
| Vikings | 0 | 0 | 0 | 0 | 0 |
| Giants | 14 | 20 | 7 | 0 | 41 |

at Giants Stadium, East Rutherford, New Jersey

- Game time: 12:30 p.m. EST
- Game weather: 40 °F (4 °C), cloudy
- Game attendance: 79,310
- Referee: Tony Corrente
- TV announcers (Fox): Pat Summerall (play-by-play), John Madden (color commentator), D. J. Johnson, and Pam Oliver (sideline reporters)

Game information

First quarter

- NYG – Ike Hilliard 46-yard pass from Kerry Collins (Brad Daluiso kick), 13:03. Giants 7–0. Drive: 4 plays, 74 yards, 1:57.
- NYG – Greg Comella 18-yard pass from Kerry Collins (Brad Daluiso kick), 12:47. Giants 14–0. Drive: 1 play, 18 yards, 0:06.

Second quarter

- NYG – Brad Daluiso 21-yard field goal, 14:56. Giants 17–0. Drive: 6 plays, 37 yards, 3:10.
- NYG – Joe Jurevicius 8-yard pass from Kerry Collins (Brad Daluiso kick), 10:24. Giants 24–0. Drive: 5 plays, 71 yards, 2:42.
- NYG – Brad Daluiso 22-yard field goal, 5:22. Giants 27–0. Drive: 10 plays, 62 yards, 3:27.
- NYG – Ike Hilliard 7-yard pass from Kerry Collins (Brad Daluiso kick), 0:12. Giants 34–0. Drive: 10 plays, 77 yards, 3:19.

Third quarter

- NYG – Amani Toomer 7-yard pass from Kerry Collins (Brad Daluiso kick), 12:06. Giants 41–0. Drive: 5 plays, 29 yards, 2:35.

Fourth quarter

- No scoring plays.

Top passers

- MIN – Daunte Culpepper – 13/28, 78 yards, 3 INT
- NYG – Kerry Collins – 28/39, 381 yards, 5 TD, 2 INT

Top rushers

- MIN – Robert Smith – 7 rushes, 44 yards
- NYG – Tiki Barber – 12 rushes, 69 yards

Top receivers

- MIN – Cris Carter – 3 receptions, 24 yards
- NYG – Ike Hilliard – 10 receptions, 155 yards, 2 TD

Quarterback Kerry Collins led the Giants to victory by throwing for 381 yards and five touchdowns in the most lopsided contest in NFC Championship Game history and the second-most lopsided conference title game ever (after the 1990 AFC Championship Game). As of the 2021 season, this game is tied for the most lopsided NFL playoff game from the 2000 playoffs to the present with the New York Jets' 41–0 win over Indianapolis in the 2002 playoffs. The Giants shut out the Vikings by limiting them to only 114 offensive yards, sacking quarterback Daunte Culpepper four times, and forcing five turnovers, and handing the Vikings their first shutout and worst loss in their postseason history. New York wide receiver Ike Hilliard had 10 receptions for 155 yards and two touchdowns. The Minnesota sports community sometimes refers to this as "41–doughnut" after a post-game comment from Randy Moss: "I was just talking to Daunte, and 41-to-doughnut, I think that's the worst defeat I've ever been in my life." Culpepper completed only 13 of 28 passes for 78 yards, with three interceptions, while Moss caught only two passes for 18 yards.

Minnesota got off to a bad start and never recovered. After the opening kickoff, Collins led the Giants 74 yards in just four plays, throwing a 46-yard touchdown pass to Hilliard to give them a 7–0 lead less than two minutes into the game. Then Giants safety Lyle West recovered a fumble from kick returner Moe Williams on the Vikings 18-yard line and Collins capitalized with an 18-yard touchdown pass to fullback Greg Comella on the next play, giving New York a 14–0 lead before the Vikings offense had even stepped onto the field. Minnesota eventually got a chance to score when cornerback Robert Tate intercepted a pass from Collins and returned it to the Giants 37-yard line. But Culpepper soon returned the favor with a pass that was intercepted in the end zone by Emmanuel McDaniel. Collins threw another interception on New York's following drive, this one to Don Morgan on the Vikings 12-yard line. However, Minnesota could not advance the ball, and Mitch Berger's 26-yard punt gave the Giants great field position on the Minnesota 41-yard line. Collins then threw a 22-yard pass to Amani Toomer that set up a Brad Daluiso field goal on the first play of the second quarter.

The next time New York got the ball, Collins' 43-yard completion to Ron Dixon set up an 8-yard touchdown pass to receiver Joe Jurevicius, making the score 24–0. Then after a punt, New York drove 62 yards and scored another Daluiso field goal, aided by a 21-yard run from Tiki Barber, and a 21-yard pass interference penalty against cornerback Wasswa Serwanga. On the last drive of the half, Hilliard caught four passes for 59 yards on a 77-yard drive that ended with his 7-yard touchdown reception with 12 seconds left.

By the time the first half ended, New York had scored 34 points (more than they had scored in any of their regular-season games) and gained 386 yards, while holding the Vikings to 45 yards.

In the third quarter, Culpepper lost a fumble while being sacked by safety Shaun Williams, and Cornelius Griffin recovered the ball on the Vikings 29, setting up Toomer's 7-yard touchdown reception to close out the scoring. New York's defense dominated the Vikings for the rest of the game, not allowing them to get beyond the Giants' 40-yard line. They also intercepted Culpepper twice, one by Sam Garnes and the other by Jason Sehorn.

By starting this game, Collins became the sixth quarterback to start in the conference championship for two different franchises joining Craig Morton, Ron Jaworski, Doug Williams, Jay Schroeder and Joe Montana. They were later joined by Kurt Warner, Brett Favre, Peyton Manning and Tom Brady. Collins had previously started the 1996 NFC Championship Game for the Carolina Panthers.

This game was the final time the Giants won a playoff game at Giants Stadium. It was also their last playoff win at home until they defeated the Atlanta Falcons during the Wild Card round during the 2011–12 NFL playoffs.

This was the third postseason meeting between the Vikings and Giants. Both teams split their first two meetings.

Previous playoff games
Tied 1–1 in all-time playoff games

1993

Minnesota Vikings 10 @ New York Giants 17

1993 NFC Wild Card playoffs

1997

Minnesota Vikings 23 @ New York Giants 22

1997 NFC Wild Card playoffs

==== AFC: Baltimore Ravens 16, Oakland Raiders 3 ====
Baltimore Ravens vs. Oakland Raiders – Game summary

| Quarter | 1 | 2 | 3 | 4 | Total |
|---|---|---|---|---|---|
| Ravens | 0 | 10 | 3 | 3 | 16 |
| Raiders | 0 | 0 | 3 | 0 | 3 |

at Network Associates Coliseum, Oakland, California

- Game time: 4:00 p.m. EST/1:00 p.m. PST
- Game weather: 55 °F (13 °C), clear
- Game attendance: 62,784
- Referee: Bill Carollo
- TV announcers (CBS): Greg Gumbel (play-by-play), Phil Simms (color commentator), Armen Keteyian, and Bonnie Bernstein (sideline reporters)

Game information

First quarter

- No scoring plays.

Second quarter

- BAL – Shannon Sharpe 96-yard pass from Trent Dilfer (Matt Stover Kick), 11:08. Ravens 7–0. Drive: 3 plays, 88 yards, 1:27.
- BAL – Matt Stover 31-yard field goal, 8:19. Ravens 10–0. Drive: 4 plays, 7 yards, 1:53.

Third quarter

- OAK – Sebastian Janikowski 24-yard field, 10:07. Ravens 10–3. Drive: 9 plays, 33 yards, 3:34.
- BAL – Matt Stover 28-yard field goal, 5:08. Ravens 13–3. Drive: 9 plays, 51 yards, 4:59.

Fourth quarter

- BAL – Matt Stover 21-yard field goal, 7:28. Ravens 16–3. Drive: 7 plays, 3 yards, 4:04.

Top passers

- BAL – Trent Dilfer – 9/18, 190 yards, TD, INT
- OAK – Bobby Hoying – 8/16, 107 yards, 2 INT

Top rushers

- BAL – Jamal Lewis – 29 rushes, 79 yards
- OAK – Bobby Hoying – 3 rushes, 13 yards

Top receivers

- BAL – Shannon Sharpe – 1 reception, 96 yards, TD
- OAK – Tim Brown – 5 receptions, 48 yards

The Ravens forced four interceptions and held the Raiders offense to only 191 total yards, 17 rushing yards, and three points. Ravens kicker Matt Stover also made three field goals. Meanwhile, Raiders quarterback Rich Gannon was knocked out of the game by a ferocious hit from Baltimore defensive tackle Tony Siragusa. He returned briefly in the second half, but was ineffective and was replaced by Bobby Hoying.

Late in the first quarter, the Ravens had a great scoring opportunity when cornerback Robert Bailey intercepted a pass from Gannon at the Raiders 19-yard line. But Baltimore could only gain one yard with their next three plays and then Stover hit the right upright on a 36-yard field goal attempt. Oakland was forced to punt on their ensuing possession, and Shane Lechler's 56-yard kick pinned the Ravens deep in their own territory. A few plays later, facing third down and 18 from their 4-yard line, Baltimore tight end Shannon Sharpe caught a short pass and ran 96 yards for a touchdown.

Gannon was knocked out of the game on the Raiders next drive and replaced by Hoying. Ravens cornerback Duane Starks subsequently intercepted Hoying's first pass of the game and returned it nine yards to the Oakland 20-yard line, setting up Stover's 31-yard field goal to give his team a 10–0 halftime lead.

In the third quarter, Oakland safety Johnnie Harris intercepted a pass from Trent Dilfer and returned it to the Ravens 39-yard line. The Raiders then drove to a first down on the Ravens 2-yard line, aided by two penalties against Baltimore for 27 yards. But they could not penetrate the end zone. First Tyrone Wheatley was dropped for a 1-yard loss. Then Gannon was sacked on second down by Jamie Sharper. On third down, Gannon's pass was incomplete and the Raiders had to settle for Sebastian Janikowski's field goal to cut the score to 10–3; those were the only Raiders points of the game. Ravens receiver Jermaine Lewis returned the ensuing kickoff 29 yards to the 38-yard line. Then Dilfer completed a 13-yard pass to Brandon Stokley and a 24-yard pass to tight end Ben Coates on a 51-yard drive that ended with another field goal by Stover. In the fourth quarter, Ray Lewis recovered a fumble from Gannon on the Raiders 6-yard line, setting up Stover's third field goal to close out the scoring. With 4:30 left in the game, Raiders receiver Andre Rison caught a 5-yard touchdown pass, but was penalized for pass interference before making the catch and the score was called back. One play later, faced with third and goal from the 12-yard line, Hoying threw a pass that was intercepted by Sharper.

This was the first postseason meeting between the Ravens and Raiders.

== Super Bowl XXXV: Baltimore Ravens 34, New York Giants 7 ==
Super Bowl XXXV – Baltimore Ravens vs. New York Giants – Game summary

| Quarter | 1 | 2 | 3 | 4 | Total |
|---|---|---|---|---|---|
| Ravens (AFC) | 7 | 3 | 14 | 10 | 34 |
| Giants (NFC) | 0 | 0 | 7 | 0 | 7 |

at Raymond James Stadium, Tampa, Florida

- Date: January 28, 2001
- Game attendance: 71,921
- Referee: Gerald Austin
- TV announcers (CBS): Greg Gumbel (play-by-play) and Phil Simms (color commentator)

This was the first Super Bowl meeting between the Ravens and Giants.
