= Sony Michel =

American football player (born 1995)

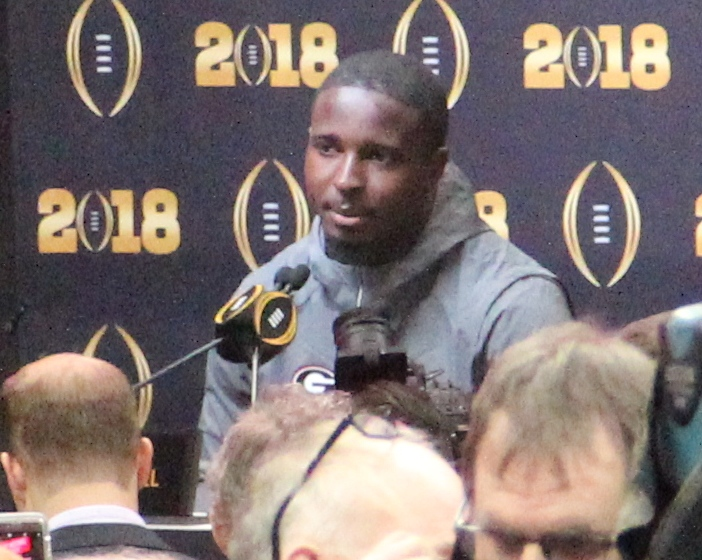
- Michel with the Georgia Bulldogs in 2018

No. 26, 25, 20
- Position: Running back

Personal information
- Born: February 17, 1995 (age 31); Hollywood, Florida, U.S.
- Listed height: 5 ft 11 in (1.80 m)
- Listed weight: 215 lb (98 kg)

Career information
- High school: Heritage (Plantation, Florida)
- College: Georgia (2014–2017)
- NFL draft: 2018: 1st round, 31st overall pick

Career history
- New England Patriots (2018–2020); Los Angeles Rams (2021); Miami Dolphins (2022)*; Los Angeles Chargers (2022); Los Angeles Rams (2023)*
- * Offseason or practice squad member only

Awards and highlights
- 2× Super Bowl champion (LIII, LVI)

Career NFL statistics
- Rushing yards: 3,243
- Rushing average: 4.2
- Rushing touchdowns: 18
- Receptions: 56
- Receiving yards: 439
- Receiving touchdowns: 2
- Stats at Pro Football Reference

Sony Michel (born February 17, 1995) is an American former professional football running back who played in the National Football League (NFL) for five seasons. He played college football for the Georgia Bulldogs and was selected by the New England Patriots in the first round of the 2018 NFL draft. During his first season with the Patriots, he was a member of the team that won Super Bowl LIII and scored the game's only touchdown. After two more years with the Patriots, Michel spent the 2021 season with Los Angeles Rams, winning Super Bowl LVI, and his final season with the Los Angeles Chargers.

== Early life ==
Michel's parents emigrated from Haiti. Michel attended American Heritage School in Plantation, Florida, where he was the starting running back for the American Heritage Patriots, beginning in his eighth-grade year there. As an eighth grader, he was named the Sun Sentinel 3A-2A-2B-1A-1B Player of the Year after rushing for 1,825 yards and 20 touchdowns, including a 281-yard performance against North Broward Prep. As a senior, Michel rushed for 1,833 yards and 24 touchdowns. Over three years playing on varsity, he rushed for 4,758 yards and 63 touchdowns. He was rated by Rivals.com as a five-star recruit and was ranked as the third-best running back and 13th-best player overall. Michel committed to the University of Georgia on April 26, 2013, to play college football.

Michel also competed in track and field at American Heritage; as a sophomore in 2011, he earned first-place finishes in both the 100-meter dash (10.99s) and 200-meter dash (21.91s) at the FHSAA 2A District Meet. He posted a personal-best time of 10.64w in the 100-meter dash at the 3rd Annual Miramar Invitational, where he placed first.

== College career ==
As a true freshman at Georgia in 2014, Michel played in eight games and made one start. He missed five games due to a fractured shoulder blade. He rushed for 410 yards on 64 carries with five rushing touchdowns. Michel entered 2015 as a backup to Nick Chubb, but earned extensive playing time. After Chubb was injured in a game against the Tennessee Volunteers, Michel took over as the starter and ran for 145 yards. In the 2016 season, Michel totaled 840 rushing yards and four rushing touchdowns to go along with 22 receptions for 149 receiving yards and a receiving touchdown.

In 2017, with true freshman Jake Fromm starting at quarterback for the Bulldogs, the team relied heavily on its senior running backs, Chubb and Michel, to carry the load. Despite remaining second in the depth chart behind Chubb, and receiving only two-thirds as many carries as Chubb, Michel had a breakout year, finishing with 1,227 rushing yards (156 carries), only 118 yards fewer than Chubb's 1,345 (223 carries). In a blowout game against Vanderbilt on October 7, Michel rushed for 150 yards and a score on only 12 carries. Three weeks later, in an October 28 rout of Florida, Michel rushed for 137 yards on only 6 carries, scoring twice on runs of 74 yards and 45 yards.

Michel's biggest game of the year came on New Year's Day against Oklahoma in the Rose Bowl, Georgia's first-ever College Football Playoff game. Carrying the ball only 11 times, Michel ran for 181 yards and three touchdowns, including a walk-off 27-yard rushing touchdown from the "Wild Dawg" formation (direct snap to Michel) to end the game in double overtime. He also added four receptions for 41 yards and a fourth touchdown. For his performance, Michel was named Rose Bowl Offensive MVP.

Chubb and Michel's 326 combined rushing yards in the Rose Bowl gave them a combined 8,259 career rushing yards, surpassing Eric Dickerson and Craig James' NCAA Division I Football Bowl Subdivision record of 8,192.

== Professional career ==
Pre-draft measurables
Height	Weight	Arm length	Hand span	Wingspan	40-yard dash	10-yard split	20-yard split	20-yard shuttle	Bench press
5 ft 10 5/8 in (1.79 m)	214 lb (97 kg)	31 1/4 in (0.79 m)	9 1/8 in (0.23 m)	6 ft 1 5/8 in (1.87 m)	4.54 s	1.56 s	2.62 s	4.21 s	22 reps
All values from NFL Combine

=== New England Patriots ===
==== 2018 season ====
Michel was selected by the New England Patriots in the first round of the 2018 NFL draft with the 31st overall pick. He was the third running back to be selected that year. In addition, he was the third of six Georgia Bulldogs to be selected that year. Michel and Isaiah Wynn were the first pair of college teammates selected by the same team in the first round since Auburn players Jason Campbell and Carlos Rogers were taken in the 2005 NFL draft by the Washington Redskins.

Michel suffered a knee injury in training camp causing him to miss the entire preseason and the season-opener against the Houston Texans. He made his NFL debut in Week 2 against the Jacksonville Jaguars. He rushed 10 times for 34 yards and had a six-yard reception in the 31–20 road loss. Two weeks later against the Miami Dolphins, he had a breakout game with 26 carries for 112 yards and a touchdown in the 38–7 victory. Michel became the first rookie to top 100 rushing yards in a game for the Patriots since Brandon Bolden in 2012. In the next game against the Indianapolis Colts, Michel rushed for 98 yards and a touchdown as the Patriots won 38–24. In the next game against the Kansas City Chiefs, he rushed for 106 yards and two touchdowns in a narrow 43–40 victory on Sunday Night Football. In the process, Michel became the first New England rookie to score on the ground twice in a game since Laurence Maroney in 2006. During a Week 12 27–13 road victory over the New York Jets, he ran for a career-high 133 yards and a touchdown, the most rushing yards by a Patriot rookie since Brandon Bolden ran for 137 yards in 2012. This game was his third time breaking the century mark, making him the first Patriots rookie since Robert Edwards did so in 1998. In a Week 16 victory against the Buffalo Bills, Michel had 18 carries for 116 yards and a touchdown.

Michel finished his rookie year with 931 rushing yards and six touchdowns along with seven receptions for 50 yards. The Patriots finished atop the AFC East with an 11–5 record and earned the No. 2 seed for the American Football Conference (AFC) Playoffs, including a first-round bye. In the Divisional Round against the Los Angeles Chargers, Michel had 24 carries for 129 yards and three touchdowns in a 41–28 victory. During the AFC Championship against the Chiefs, he ran for 113 yards and two touchdowns on 29 carries in the 37–31 overtime road victory. Michel broke the NFL record for most playoff rushing touchdowns for a rookie, scoring five between the divisional and conference championship games. On February 3, 2019, he scored the only touchdown of Super Bowl LIII against the Los Angeles Rams, carrying 18 times for a game-leading 94 yards. The go-ahead touchdown occurred in the middle of the fourth quarter in the 13–3 victory. Michel was the leading rusher in the game and extended his rookie postseason rushing record to six touchdowns in three games; he scored six touchdowns in 13 regular-season games. Only Hall of Fame running back Terrell Davis has rushed for more touchdowns in a single postseason than Michel; Davis scored eight touchdowns in four games in the 1997 postseason. Michel is the first player since Davis with more than four rushing touchdowns in one postseason.

==== 2019 season ====
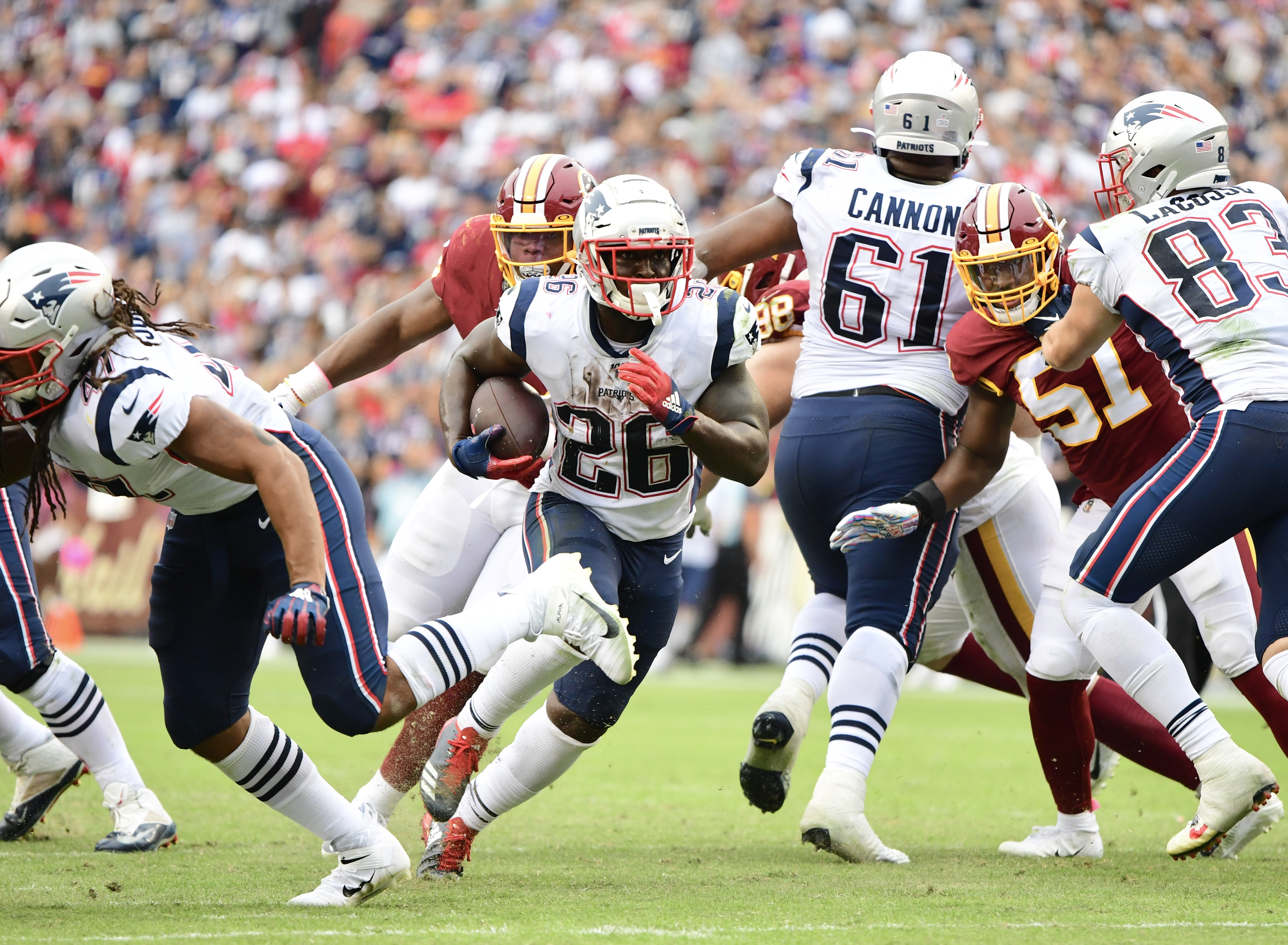
Michel in a game against the Washington Redskins

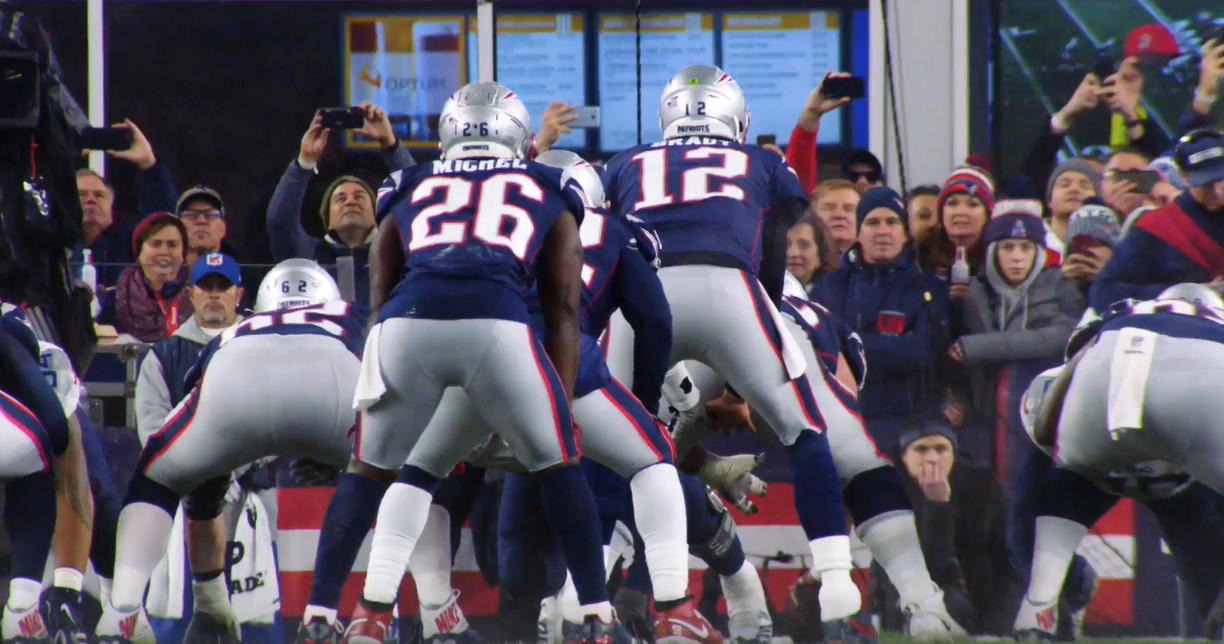
Michel alongside Tom Brady in the AFC wild card game against the Tennessee Titans

During Week 2 against the Dolphins, Michel rushed 21 times for 83 yards and his first rushing touchdown of the season in the 43–0 shutout road victory. Three weeks later against the Washington Redskins, he rushed 16 times for 91 yards and a touchdown and caught three passes for 32 yards in the 33–7 road victory. Two weeks later against the Jets, Michel rushed 19 times for 42 yards and three touchdowns in the 33–0 shutout road victory.

Overall, Michel finished the 2019 season with 247 carries for 912 rushing yards and seven touchdowns along with 12 receptions for 94 yards.

==== 2020 season ====
Michel was placed on the active/physically unable to perform list at the start of training camp on August 2, 2020. He was activated from the list on August 26. In Week 3, Michel recorded 140 scrimmage yards (117 rushing, 23 receiving) in the 36–20 victory over the Las Vegas Raiders. He was placed on injured reserve on October 5, 2020, with a quadriceps injury. He was placed on the reserve/COVID-19 list by the Patriots on October 17, 2020, and removed from the list back to injured reserve on October 31. He was activated off of injured reserve on November 21, 2020. Despite being activated, Michel had limited playing time after second year running back Damien Harris played well when Michel was out and took over as the starting running back. However, Michel got more playing time after an injury to Harris. In Week 17 against the Jets, Michel carried the ball 16 times for 76 yards, and caught three passes for 60 yards and his first career receiving touchdown during the 28–14 win. Overall, Michel finished the 2020 season with 449 rushing yards and one touchdown, along with seven receptions for 114 yards and one touchdown.

=== Los Angeles Rams (first stint) ===
Michel was traded to the Rams on August 25, 2021, in exchange for a fifth and sixth-round pick in the 2022 NFL draft. In Week 13, against the Jaguars, he had 24 carries for 121 rushing yards and one rushing touchdown in the 37–7 victory. In Week 16, against the Minnesota Vikings, he had 27 carries for 131 rushing yards and a rushing touchdown in the 30–23 victory. He finished the 2021 season with 208 carries for 845 rushing yards and four rushing touchdowns to go along with 21 receptions for 128 receiving yards and one receiving touchdown. Michel won his second Super Bowl title when the Rams defeated the Cincinnati Bengals in Super Bowl LVI. In the Super Bowl, Michel had two carries for two yards.

=== Miami Dolphins ===
On May 10, 2022, Michel signed with the Dolphins. He was released on August 29, 2022.

=== Los Angeles Chargers ===
On August 31, 2022, Michel signed with the Chargers. He was released on December 31, 2022.

=== Los Angeles Rams (second stint) ===
On June 20, 2023, Michel signed with the Rams.

Michel announced his retirement on July 29, 2023. According to Rams head coach Sean McVay, Michel said his body was telling him it was time to retire.

== Career statistics ==
=== NFL ===
Legend
	Won the Super Bowl
**Bold**	Career high

==== Regular season ====
Year	Team	Games		Rushing					Receiving					Fumbles	
Year	Team	GP	GS	Att	Yds	Avg	Lng	TD	Rec	Yds	Avg	Lng	TD	Fum	Lost
2018	NE	13	8	209	**931**	4.5	34	6	7	50	7.1	13	0	1	**1**
2019	NE	16	14	**247**	912	3.7	26	**7**	12	94	7.8	19	0	**2**	**1**
2020	NE	9	6	79	449	**5.7**	**48**	1	7	114	**16.3**	**31**	**1**	0	0
2021	LAR	17	7	208	845	4.1	39	4	**21**	**128**	6.1	24	**1**	1	**1**
2022	LAC	10	0	36	106	2.9	12	0	9	53	5.9	9	0	0	0
Career		65	35	779	3,243	4.2	48	18	56	439	7.8	31	2	4	3

==== Postseason ====
Year	Team	Games		Rushing					Receiving					Fumbles	
Year	Team	GP	GS	Att	Yds	Avg	Lng	TD	Rec	Yds	Avg	Lng	TD	Fum	Lost
2018	NE	3	2	**71**	**336**	**4.7**	**40**	**6**	1	**9**	**9.0**	**9**	0	0	0
2019	NE	1	0	14	61	4.4	25	0	2	**9**	4.5	7	0	0	0
2021	LAR	3	1	24	78	3.3	35	0	**3**	−8	−2.7	0	0	0	0
Career		7	3	109	475	4.4	40	6	6	10	1.7	9	0	0	0

=== College ===
Season	Team	GP	Rushing					Receiving				
Season	Team	GP	Att	Yds	Avg	Lng	TD	Rec	Yds	Avg	Lng	TD
2014	Georgia	8	64	410	6.4	75	5	7	106	15.1	33	1
2015	Georgia	13	219	1,136	5.3	66	8	26	270	10.4	48	3
2016	Georgia	12	152	840	5.5	42	4	22	149	6.8	33	1
2017	Georgia	14	156	1,227	7.9	55	16	9	96	10.7	11	1
Career		47	590	3,613	6.1	75	33	64	621	9.7	48	6

== Personal life ==
Michel's older brother, Marken Michel, is a wide receiver for the Calgary Stampeders of the Canadian Football League, and was the 2017 West Division Most Outstanding Rookie with them.

Michel is a Christian. Michel has said, “Without Jesus Christ, our Lord, and Savior, there is none of this. We get all this glory, but the glory is not for us, it’s for Him. We do this for Him. That’s kind of my purpose. So really, none of this matters to me.”
