= Dee Ford =

American football player (born 1991)

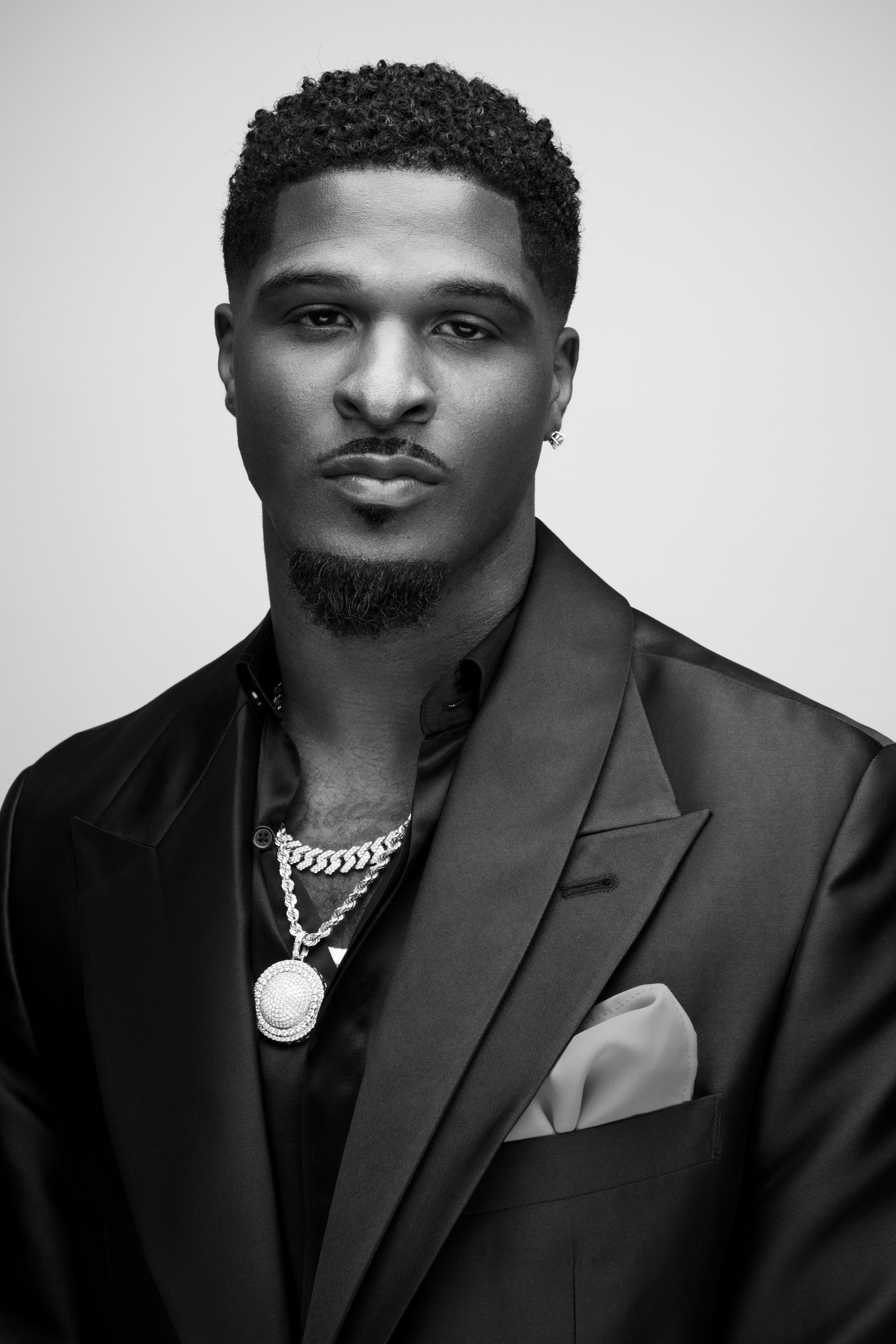
- Ford in 2025

No. 55
- Position: Linebacker

Personal information
- Born: March 19, 1991 (age 35); Odenville, Alabama, U.S.
- Listed height: 6 ft 2 in (1.88 m)
- Listed weight: 252 lb (114 kg)

Career information
- High school: St. Clair County (Odenville)
- College: Auburn (2009–2013)
- NFL draft: 2014: 1st round, 23rd overall pick

Career history
- Kansas City Chiefs (2014–2018); San Francisco 49ers (2019–2021)

Awards and highlights
- Pro Bowl (2018); NFL forced fumbles co-leader (2018); BCS national champion (2010); First-team All-SEC (2013)

Career NFL statistics
- Total tackles: 159
- Sacks: 40.0
- Forced fumbles: 12
- Pass deflections: 7
- Stats at Pro Football Reference

Donald “Dee” Ford (born March 19, 1991) is an American former professional football player who was a linebacker in the National Football League (NFL). He played college football for the Auburn Tigers and was selected by the Kansas City Chiefs in the first round of the 2014 NFL draft.

== Early life ==
Ford attended St. Clair County High School in Odenville, Alabama. While there, he played high school football. As a senior, Ford recorded 90 tackles, including 38 tackles for loss and 18 sacks, intercepted a pass, and broke up three while being named to the Class 4A All-State team by the Alabama Sports Writers Association. As a junior, he posted 87 total tackles with 16 tackles for a loss and 12 sacks.

Considered a three-star recruit by Rivals.com, he was ranked as the 62nd best outside linebacker prospect in the nation.

== College career ==
Ford attended Auburn University from 2009 to 2013. During his career, he had 19.5 sacks. As a senior in 2013, he was an All-Southeastern Conference (SEC) selection.

== Professional career ==
=== Pre-draft ===
On January 25, 2014, Ford attended the Reese's Senior Bowl and had an impressive performance after recording two combined tackles, two tackles for a loss, a pass deflection, and sacked Virginia Tech's Logan Thomas twice to help the South defeat the North 20–10. His Senior Bowl performance helped him raise his draft stock. NFL draft experts and analysts projected Ford to be a first or second round. He received an invitation to the NFL Combine, but did not perform any physical drills after doctors recommended him sit out after issues stemming from a back injury he suffered in 2011. On March 4, 2014, Ford participated at Auburn's pro day and was able to complete all of the combine and positional drills for team representatives and scouts. All 32 NFL teams had representatives present at Auburn's pro day to scout Ford, Greg Robinson, and ten other prospects. He was ranked the second best defensive end prospect in the draft by NFLDraftScout.com and Sports Illustrated and was ranked the third best defensive end by NFL analyst Mike Mayock.

Pre-draft measurables
Height	Weight	Arm length	Hand span	40-yard dash	10-yard split	20-yard split	20-yard shuttle	Three-cone drill	Vertical jump	Broad jump	Bench press
6 ft 2 1/8 in (1.88 m)	252 lb (114 kg)	32 7/8 in (0.84 m)	10 1/4 in (0.26 m)	4.59 s	1.67 s	2.69 s	4.73 s	7.07 s	35.5 in (0.90 m)	10 ft 4 in (3.15 m)	29 reps
All values from Auburn's Pro Day

=== Kansas City Chiefs ===
==== 2014 ====
The Kansas City Chiefs selected Ford in the first round (23rd overall) of the 2014 NFL draft.

Ford competed with Dezman Moses, Frank Zombo, and Josh Mauga throughout training camp for a job as the backup linebacker. Head coach Andy Reid named him the backup right outside linebacker to Tamba Hali to begin the regular season.

Ford made his NFL debut during the 10–26 season-opening loss to the Tennessee Titans. Two weeks later, he recorded his first NFL tackle and deflected a pass during a 34–15 victory over the Miami Dolphins. During Week 8, Ford made a season-high three combined tackles and was credited a half a sack making it the first of his career during a 34–7 victory over the St. Louis Rams. Ford joined a highly-touted linebacking corps as a rookie, that consisted of Justin Houston, Derrick Johnson, and Hali. With Houston and Hali already staples in the defense, Ford received no starts in 16 game appearances and was limited to only seven combined tackles and 1.5 sacks.

==== 2015 season ====
Ford returned to his role as the backup outside linebacker in 2015, behind key veteran Hali and Houston. Ford missed Weeks 11–12 after suffering a back injury. During Week 13, Ford earned his first NFL start against the Oakland Raiders after Houston suffered a knee injury that caused him to miss the rest of the season. Ford finished the 34–20 victory over the Raiders with a solo tackle. In the next game against the San Diego Chargers, he made a season-high seven solo tackles, defended a pass, and sacked quarterback Philip Rivers thrice in a 10–3 victory. Ford made his first career solo sack and marked a career-high with his three-sack performance.

Ford finished his second professional season with 23 combined tackles (21 solo), two pass deflections, and four sacks in 14 games and five starts.

==== 2016 season ====
Ford began the 2016 season as the starting right outside linebacker, in place of Houston, who was recovering from surgery in February to repair a torn ACL.

Ford started in the season-opener against the San Diego Chargers and recorded four solo tackles and a sack on Philip Rivers during the 33–27 overtime victory. During Week 6, Ford made five combined tackles and sacked Oakland Raiders quarterback Derek Carr twice in a 26–10 road victory. He did not record a sack in the next game against the New Orleans Saints and only recorded one tackle total on a down effort/ However, the Chiefs still won 27–21. The following week against the Indianapolis Colts, Ford collected five combined tackles and was credited with a career-high 3.5 sacks on quarterback Andrew Luck during a 30–14 victory. During Week 9, he had his second consecutive game with multiple sacks after he sacked quarterback Blake Bortles twice during a 19–14 victory over the Jacksonville Jaguars. In the next game, Ford collected three combined tackles, deflected a pass, and recorded a sack on Cam Newton, as the Chiefs defeated the Carolina Panthers by a score 20–17. This was his third consecutive game with a sack. Through Ford's first nine games of his 2016 season, he was tied with Lorenzo Alexander as the NFL's sack leader. Although Houston returned to his starting left outside linebacker role in Week 11, Ford was able to start at right outside linebacker from Weeks 14–16 ahead of Hali.

Ford finished his third season with 38 combined tackles (25 solo), a career-high ten sacks, and two pass deflections in 15 games and 14 starts.

==== 2017 season ====
On May 1, 2017, the Chiefs exercised the fifth-year option on Ford's rookie contract that pays him $8.71 million in 2018.

Ford was set to begin his fourth season as the backup left outside linebacker to Hali, until Hali was placed on the physically unable to perform list with an unspecified injury and was set to miss the first six games.

Ford started in the season-opener against the New England Patriots and made four solo tackles in the 42–27 road victory. The following week, he earned two solo tackles and sacked quarterback Carson Wentz in a 27–20 victory over the Philadelphia Eagles. Ford was unable to play in Weeks 4–5 after sustaining a back injury. On October 15, 2017, he collected four combined tackles and a sack on Ben Roethlisberger, as the Chiefs were defeated by the Pittsburgh Steelers by a score 13–19. Ford was placed on injured reserve on December 7, 2017.

==== 2018 season ====
During Week 8, Ford sacked Case Keenum thrice in a 30–23 win over the Denver Broncos, earning him AFC Defensive Player of the Week. Overall for the month of October, Ford recorded 13 tackles, four sacks, and three forced fumbles, earning himself American Football Conference (AFC) Defensive Player of the Month.

In the final minutes of the 4th quarter of the 2018 AFC Championship Game against the New England Patriots, Ford was called for an offsides penalty that reversed a Charvarius Ward interception that would have likely sealed the game for the Chiefs, as the Patriots would go on to win 37–31 in overtime and advance to Super Bowl LIII where they would defeat the Los Angeles Rams.

On March 2, 2019, the Chiefs placed the franchise tag on Ford.

=== San Francisco 49ers ===
==== 2019 season ====
On March 12, 2019, the Chiefs agreed to a trade that would send Ford to the San Francisco 49ers in exchange for a second-round pick in the 2020 NFL draft, which the Chiefs later used to select Willie Gay. Ford would sign a five-year contract worth $87.5 million after the trade was officially completed on March 13, 2019.

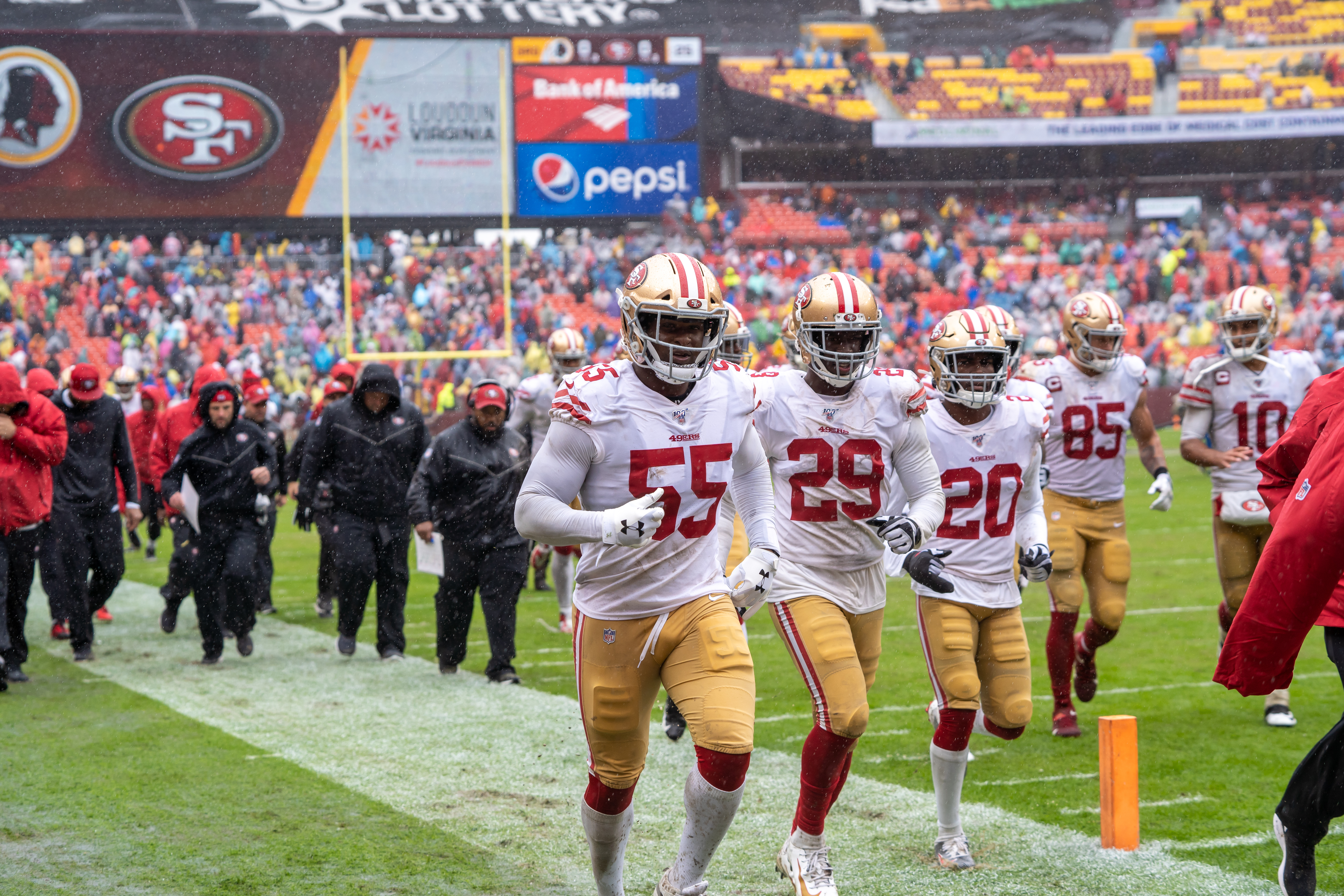
Ford (center) with the San Francisco 49ers in 2019

Ford made his 49ers debut in the season-opener against the Tampa Bay Buccaneers, sacking Jameis Winston once in the 31–17 road victory. During Week 6 against the Los Angeles Rams, Ford sacked Jared Goff 1.5 times in the 20–7 road victory.

Ford finished his first season with the 49ers tallying 14 tackles and 6.5 sacks in 11 games and two starts. In the playoffs, he helped the 49ers defeat the Minnesota Vikings and Green Bay Packers to advance to Super Bowl LIV where they would lose to Ford’s former team, the Kansas City Chiefs. Ford recorded two tackles in the Super Bowl.

==== 2020 season ====
On October 3, 2020, Ford was placed on injured reserve with a neck and back injury. He only played in one game on the season.

==== 2021 season ====
On November 6, 2021, Ford was placed on injured reserve. He played in six games in the 2021 season. He totaled three sacks and one forced fumble. He was released on July 27, 2022.

== Career statistics ==
=== NFL ===
Legend
	Led the league
**Bold**	Career high

==== Regular season ====
Year	Team	Games		Tackles				Interceptions						Fumbles			
Year	Team	GP	GS	Cmb	Solo	Ast	Sck	Int	Yds	Avg	Lng	TD	PD	FF	FR	Yds	TD
2014	KC	**16**	0	8	4	4	1.5	0	0	0.0	0	0	1	0	0	0	0
2015	KC	14	5	23	21	2	4.0	0	0	0.0	0	0	**2**	0	0	0	0
2016	KC	15	14	38	25	**13**	10.0	0	0	0.0	0	0	**2**	1	0	0	0
2017	KC	6	6	13	11	2	2.0	0	0	0.0	0	0	1	1	0	0	0
2018	KC	**16**	**16**	**55**	**42**	**13**	**13.0**	0	0	0.0	0	0	0	**7**	0	0	0
2019	SF	11	2	14	10	4	6.5	0	0	0.0	0	0	1	2	0	0	0
2020	SF	1	0	3	1	2	0.0	0	0	0.0	0	0	0	0	0	0	0
2021	SF	6	0	5	3	2	3.0	0	0	0.0	0	0	0	1	0	0	0
Career		85	43	159	117	42	40.0	0	0	0.0	0	0	7	12	0	0	0

==== Postseason ====
Year	Team	Games		Tackles				Interceptions						Fumbles			
Year	Team	GP	GS	Cmb	Solo	Ast	Sck	Int	Yds	Avg	Lng	TD	PD	FF	FR	Yds	TD
2015	KC	2	1	**6**	**6**	0	0.0	0	0	0.0	0	0	0	0	0	0	0
2016	KC	1	1	3	1	**2**	0.5	0	0	0	0	0	0	0	0	0	0
2017	KC	0	0	Did not play due to injury													
2018	KC	2	**2**	4	4	0	**1.0**	0	0	0.0	0	0	0	**1**	0	0	0
2019	SF	**3**	0	4	3	1	**1.0**	0	0	0.0	0	0	0	0	0	0	0
2021	SF	0	0	Did not play due to injury													
Career		8	4	17	14	3	2.5	0	0	0.0	0	0	0	1	0	0	0

=== College ===
Season	Team	Games		Defense					
Season	Team	GP	GS	Tckl	TfL	Sck	QBH	PD	FF
2009	Auburn	13	0	12	2.5	1.0	7	1	0
2010	Auburn	13	1	11	2	2.0	4	0	0
2011	Auburn	3	0	7	2	1.0	4	0	0
2012	Auburn	—	7	34	6.5	6.0	8	1	1
2013	Auburn	13	11	29	14.5	10.5	17	1	2
Career		42	19	93	27.5	20.5	40	3	3

== Personal life ==
Ford is one of three children, born to his parents James and Debbie Ford. His parents married as teenagers, and have been together for three decades. He has a brother and a sister. Debbie worked two jobs, both as a licensed practical nurse, in order to pay the bills when the children were younger.

In addition to playing football, Ford is known for his exceptional piano playing abilities.
