= Charvarius Ward =

American football player (born 1996)

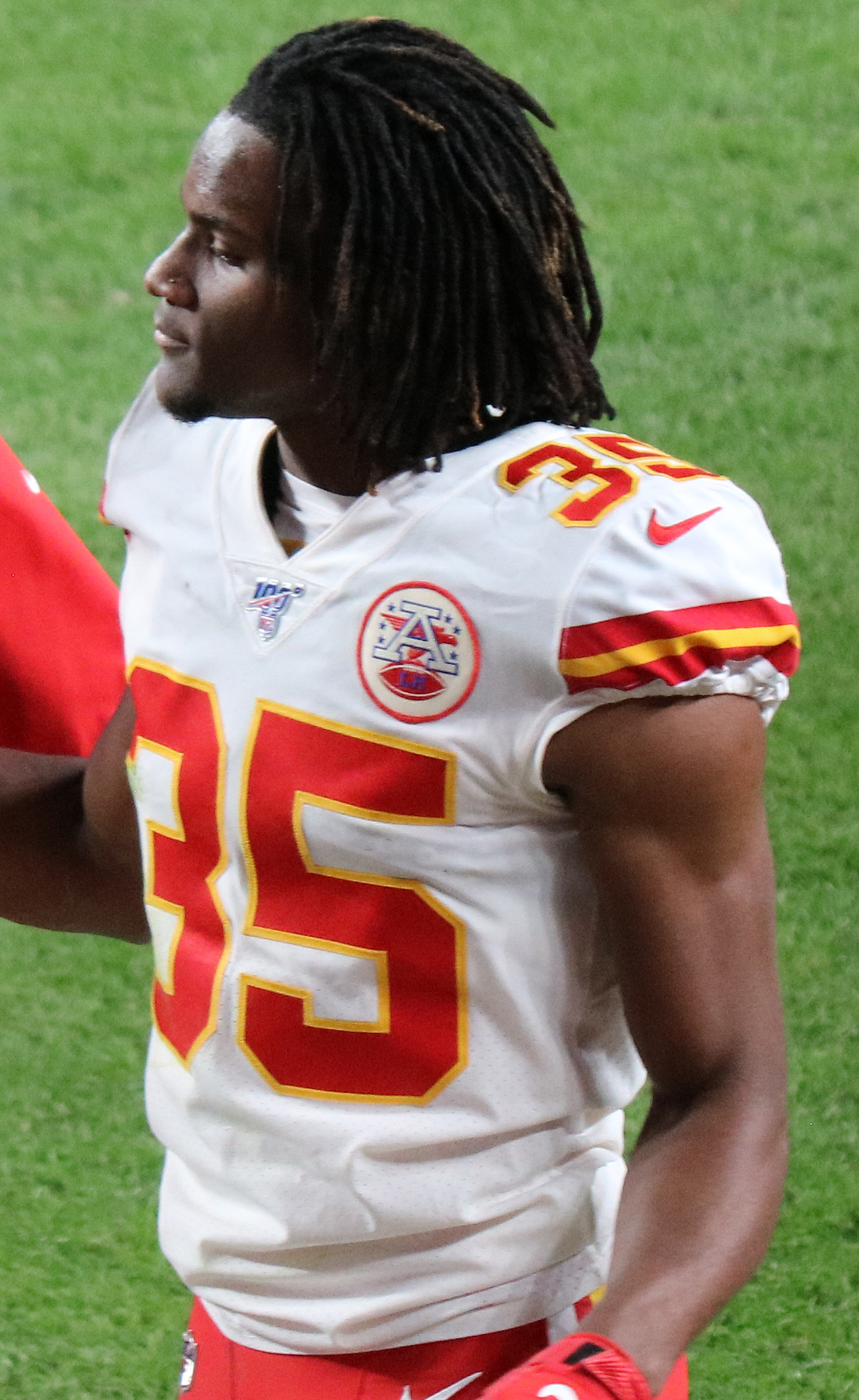
- Ward with the Kansas City Chiefs in 2019

No. 7 – Indianapolis Colts
- Position: Cornerback
- Roster status: Active

Personal information
- Born: May 16, 1996 (age 30); McComb, Mississippi, U.S.
- Listed height: 6 ft 1 in (1.85 m)
- Listed weight: 196 lb (89 kg)

Career information
- High school: McComb
- College: Hinds CC (2014–2015); Middle Tennessee (2016–2017)
- NFL draft: 2018: undrafted

Career history
- Dallas Cowboys (2018)*; Kansas City Chiefs (2018–2021); San Francisco 49ers (2022–2024); Indianapolis Colts (2025–present)
- * Offseason or practice squad member only

Awards and highlights
- Super Bowl champion (LIV); Second-team All-Pro (2023); Pro Bowl (2023)

Career NFL statistics as of Week 10, 2026
- Total tackles: 490
- Pass deflections: 85
- Interceptions: 10
- Sacks: 1.0
- Forced fumbles: 3
- Fumble recoveries: 2
- Stats at Pro Football Reference

Charvarius Ward (born May 16, 1996) is an American professional football cornerback for the Indianapolis Colts of the National Football League (NFL). He played college football for the Middle Tennessee Blue Raiders, and signed with the Dallas Cowboys as an undrafted free agent in 2018. Ward has also played for the Kansas City Chiefs, with whom he won Super Bowl LIV, and the San Francisco 49ers.

== Early life and college ==
Ward attended McComb High School. As a senior, he tallied 48 tackles, one interception and received All-region honors.

He enrolled at Hinds Community College. As a freshman, he collected 32 tackles, 3 interceptions, 5 passes defended and one forced fumble. As a sophomore, he recorded 32 tackles, one interception, 2 passes defended and one blocked kick.

He transferred to Middle Tennessee State University for his junior season, appearing in 12 games with 2 starts, while making 26 tackles, 2 interceptions, 5 passes defended, one quarterback hurry and one fumble recovery. As a senior, he played in 13 games with 8 starts, posting 48 tackles (sixth on the team), 3 tackles for loss, one sack and led the team with 14 passes defended.

== Professional career ==
=== Pre-draft ===
Ward did not receive an invitation to attend the NFL Combine. On January 20, 2018, Ward played the NFLPA Collegiate Bowl. On March 12, 2018, Ward attended Middle Tennessee State's pro day and performed all of the combine and positional drills. He had a stellar performance at his pro day which greatly elevated his draft stock. At the conclusion of the pre-draft process, Ward was ranked as the 46th best cornerback prospect in the 2018 NFL draft by DraftScout.com.

Pre-draft measurables
Height	Weight	Arm length	Hand span	Wingspan	40-yard dash	10-yard split	20-yard split	20-yard shuttle	Three-cone drill	Vertical jump	Broad jump	Bench press
6 ft 0 5/8 in (1.84 m)	198 lb (90 kg)	32 1/4 in (0.82 m)	10 1/8 in (0.26 m)	6 ft 5 1/2 in (1.97 m)	4.44 s	1.71 s	2.62 s	4.56 s	7.52 s	31 in (0.79 m)	11 ft 0 in (3.35 m)	12 reps
All values from Middle Tennessee State Pro Day

=== Dallas Cowboys ===
On April 30, 2018, the Dallas Cowboys signed Ward to a three–year, $1.71 million contract as an undrafted free agent that includes a signing bonus of $5,000.

Throughout training camp, Ward competed to be the fifth cornerback on the active roster against Marquez White, Duke Thomas, and Donovan Olumba.

=== Kansas City Chiefs ===
==== 2018 ====
On August 30, 2018, the Kansas City Chiefs traded offensive guard Parker Ehinger to the Cowboys in exchange for Ward to provide needed depth for their offensive line. Head coach Andy Reid named Ward a backup cornerback and listed him as the fifth cornerback on the depth chart to begin the season, behind Steven Nelson, Kendall Fuller, Orlando Scandrick, and Tremon Smith. He was inactive as a healthy scratch for the first three games (Weeks 1–3) while he learned the playbook and acclimated himself to the pro game. By Week 4, he had surpassed Tremon Smith on the depth chart as the fourth cornerback.

On October 1, 2018, Ward made his professional regular season debut and recorded three combined tackles (two solo) during a 27–23 victory at the Denver Broncos. On December 23, 2018, Ward earned his first career start after Kendall Fuller was placed on injured reserve and underwent surgery on his wrist. He recorded eight combined tackles (seven solo) and deflected a pass as the Chiefs lost 38–31 at the Seattle Seahawks in Week 16. The following week, he collected a season-high nine solo tackles and set a season-high with two pass deflections as the Chiefs routed the Oakland Raiders 35–3 in Week 17. He finished his rookie season with 30 combined tackles (26 solo) and three pass deflections in 13 games and two starts.

The Kansas City Chiefs finished the 2018 NFL season first in the AFC West with a 12–4 record and earned a first round bye. On January 12, 2019, Ward started in his first career playoff game and recorded four combined tackles (two solo) and had a team-high four pass deflections during a 31–13 win against the Indianapolis Colts in the American Football Conference (AFC) Divisional Round. On January 20, 2019, he made seven combined tackles (four solo) in the Chiefs' 37–31 loss against the New England Patriots in the AFC Championship. With 54 seconds remaining, Ward caught what would have been the game-ending interception to send the Chiefs to Super Bowl LIII, but the play did not stand due to an offside penalty by defensive end Dee Ford.

==== 2019 ====
On January 24, 2019, the Chiefs announced Steve Spagnuolo as their new defensive coordinator, following the decision to fire Bob Sutton. Throughout training camp, Ward competed to be the No. 1 starting cornerback against Kendall Fuller, Bashaud Breeland, and Morris Claiborne. Head coach Andy Reid named him the No. 1 starting cornerback to begin the season and paired him with Bashaud Breeland.

On September 15, 2019, Ward made four combined tackles (three solo), two pass deflections, and made his first career interception on a pass attempt by Derek Carr to wide receiver Ryan Grant during a 28–10 win at the Oakland Raiders. On October 13, 2019, Ward collected a season-high eight combined tackles (seven solo), made one pass deflection, and had a highlight reel one-handed interception while covering DeAndre Hopkins on a pass by Deshaun Watson during a 24-31 loss against the Houston Texans. In Week 11, he made two combined tackles (one solo) and set a season-high with three pass deflections during a 24–17 victory at the Los Angeles Chargers. On December 1, 2019, he recorded two solo tackles and scored two points on an extra points conversion when an extra points field goal attempt by Daniel Carlson was blocked by Tanoh Kpassagnon and then recovered by Ward for two points at the end of the fourth quarter of a 40–9 win against the Oakland Raiders. He finished the season with a total of 74 combined tackles (56 solo), ten passes defended, two interceptions, and a forced fumble.

The Kansas City Chiefs finished the 2019 NFL season a top the AFC West with a 12–4 record to clinch a first-round bye. On January 12, 2020, he recorded four combined tackles (three solo) and broke up a pass as the Chiefs defeated the Houston Texans 51–31 in the Divisional Round. The following week, the Chiefs defeated the Tennessee Titans 35–24 in the AFC Championship Game to advance to the Super Bowl. On February 2, 2020, Ward started in Super Bowl LIV, making four combined tackles (three solo) and a pass deflection as the Chiefs defeated the San Francisco 49ers 31–20. He earned the first and, thus far, only Super Bowl ring of his career.

==== 2020 ====
He entered training camp as the de facto No. 1 starting cornerback after Bashaud Breeland was suspended for the first four games. Head coach Andy Reid named Ward and Rashad Fenton the starting cornerbacks to begin the season.

On September 10, 2020, Ward started in the Kansas City Chiefs' home-opener against the Houston Texans and made one solo tackle before exiting in the second quarter of the 34–20 victory due to an injury. He was inactive for a 23–20 victory at the Los Angeles Chargers in Week 2 due to a fractured hand. On October 25, 2020, Ward collected a season-high nine combined tackles (seven solo) and had his first career sack on Drew Lock for a nine–yard loss during the 43–16 win at the Denver Broncos. He was inactive as a healthy scratch during a 21–38 loss to the Los Angeles Chargers in Week 17 as head coach Andy Reid chose to rest his starters in preparation for the playoffs. He finished with 51 combined tackles (38 solo), one sack, and six passes defended in 14 games and 13 starts. Pro Football Focus had Ward finish the season with an overall grade of 64.3.

The Kansas City Chiefs finished the 2020 NFL season first in the AFC West with a 14–2 record, clinching a first-round bye. The Chiefs defeated the Cleveland Browns 22–17 in the AFC Wild-Card Game. On January 24, 2021, Ward started in the AFC Championship Game and made seven combined tackles (six solo) and a pass deflection during a 38–24 win against the Buffalo Bills. On February 7, 2021, Ward started in Super Bowl LV and produced five combined tackles (three solo) as the Chiefs lost 31–9 to the Tampa Bay Buccaneers.

==== 2021 ====
On March 17, 2021, the Kansas City Chiefs placed a second-round restricted free agent tender on Ward. On June 10, 2021, the Chiefs signed Ward to his tender for a one–year, $3.38 million contract. He returned as the No. 1 starting cornerback and was paired with L'Jarius Sneed.

He sustained a strained hamstring and was inactive for four games (Weeks 3–6). In Week 11, Ward made seven combined tackles (five solo), a season-high three pass deflections, and intercepted a pass thrown by Dak Prescott to wide receiver CeeDee Lamb during a 19–9 win against the Dallas Cowboys. In Week 15, he collected a career-high ten combined tackles (seven solo) and had two pass deflections during a 34–28 overtime victory at the Los Angeles Chargers. On December 20, 2021, he was placed on the Reserve/COVID-19 list. On December 23, 2021, the Chiefs removed him from the COVID-19/reserve list and added him to their active roster. The following week, he made three solo tackles, a pass deflection, and intercepted an overthrown pass by Ben Roethlisberger intended for RayRay McCloud as the Chiefs defeated the Pittsburgh Steelers 36–10 in Week 16. He finished the season with 67 combined tackles (48 solo), two interceptions, and 10 pass defenses in 13 games and 12 starts. He received an overall grade of 71.2 from Pro Football Focus in 2021.

The Kansas City Chiefs ended the 2021 NFL season first in the AFC West with a 12–4 record to clinch a playoff berth. On January 16, 2022, he made six combined tackles (five solo) and a pass deflection during a 42–21 win against the Pittsburgh Steelers in the AFC Wild-Card Game. They defeated the Buffalo Bills in a closely contested 42–36 overtime victory in the Divisional Round. On January 30, 2022, Ward started in the AFC Championship Game, recording five combined tackles (four solo) and one pass deflection as the Chiefs lost in overtime 27–24 against the Cincinnati Bengals.

=== San Francisco 49ers ===
==== 2022 ====
On March 14, 2022, the San Francisco 49ers signed Ward to a three–year, $40.50 million contract that includes $26.62 million guaranteed, $18.06 million guaranteed upon signing, and a signing bonus of $12.02 million.

He entered training camp slated as the de facto No. 1 starting cornerback following the departure of Jason Verrett. Head coach Kyle Shanahan named him the No. 1 starting cornerback to begin the season and paired him with Emmanuel Moseley.

On September 18, 2022, Ward made eight combined tackles (four solo), one pass deflection, and intercepted a pass by running back DeeJay Dallas to wide receiver D. K. Metcalf during a 27–7 victory against the Seattle Seahawks. In Week 5, he recorded four combined tackles (three solo) and a career-high four pass deflections during a 37–15 win at the Carolina Panthers. In Week 11, Ward collected a season-high ten combined tackles (nine solo) during a 38–10 win at the Arizona Cardinals. On December 15, 2022, he made six solo tackles, two pass deflections, and returned his first career fumble recovery for 40–yards to set up a Christian McCaffrey touchdown during a 21–13 win at the Seattle Seahawks to secure the NFC West for the 49ers. He started in all 17 games for the first time in his career and had a career-high 87 combined tackles (59 solo), a career-high 11 pass deflections, a forced fumble, one fumble recovery, and one interception.

==== 2023 ====
On February 9, 2023, the San Francisco 49ers hired Steve Wilks to be their new defensive coordinator after DeMeco Ryans accepted the head coaching position with the Houston Texans. Head coach Kyle Shanahan named Ward the No. 1 starting cornerback to begin the season and paired him with Deommodore Lenoir.

On September 10, 2023, Ward started in the San Francisco 49ers' season-opener at the Pittsburgh Steelers and made three combined tackles (two solo), a pass deflection, and intercepted a pass by Kenny Pickett to wide receiver Diontae Johnson during a 30–7 victory. The following week, he collected a season-high ten combined tackles (eight solo) and broke up a pass during a 30–23 win at the Los Angeles Rams. In Week 13, Ward made five combined tackles (four solo) and set a season-high with four pass deflections during a 42–19 win at the Philadelphia Eagles. On December 17, 2023, Ward made three combined tackles (two solo), two pass deflections, a career-high two interceptions, and returned one for his first career touchdown during a 45–29 win at the Arizona Cardinals. He scored his first career pick-six during the first quarter after intercepting a pass by Kyler Murray to tight end Trey McBride and returned it 66–yards for his first career touchdown. On December 31, 2023, he had four combined tackles (three solo), a pass deflection, and set a new career-high with his sixth interception of the season on a pass by Sam Howell to wide receiver Terry McLaurin during a 27–10 win at the Washington Commanders. He started all 17 games for the second consecutive year and finished the season with a total of 72 combined tackles (56 solo), a career-high 23 pass deflections, and a career-high five interceptions. His six interceptions to led the league in 2023. He earned Pro Bowl honors for the first time in his career. He received an overall grade of 84.7 from Pro Football Focus, which ranked fifth among all cornerbacks.

The San Francisco 49ers finished the 2023 NFL season atop the NFC West with a 12–5 record. They defeated the Green Bay Packers 24–21 in the Divisional Round and went on to also defeat the Detroit Lions 34–31 in the NFC Championship Game. On February 11, 2024, Ward started in Super Bowl LVIII and made four combined tackles (three solo) in the 49ers' 25–22 overtime loss to his former team, the Kansas City Chiefs.

==== 2024 ====
On February 14, 2024, the 49ers fired defensive coordinator Steve Wilks and promoted Nick Sorensen to defensive coordinator in his place. Ward and Deommodore Lenoir returned as the starting cornerbacks to begin the season.

In Week 3, he racked up a season-high nine combined tackles (six solo) during a 24–27 loss at the Los Angeles Rams. He was inactive during the 49ers' 36–24 victory over the Seattle Seahawks on Thursday Night Football due to a knee injury. He was inactive for three games (Weeks 10–12) due to a personal matter. He was also inactive during a 34–40 loss against the Detroit Lions in Week 17 due to a personal matter. He finished the 2024 NFL season with 54 combined tackles (38 solo) and seven passes defended in 12 games and 12 starts. He received an overall grade of 76.6 from Pro Football Focus.

Following the 2024 season, Ward had decided to move on from San Francisco, attributing his decision to the sudden passing of his newborn daughter during the season.

=== Indianapolis Colts ===
==== 2025 ====
On March 13, 2025, the Indianapolis Colts signed Ward to a three–year, $54 million contract that includes $35 million guaranteed, $27 million guaranteed upon signing, and also includes an initial signing bonus of $20 million. This deal will keep him under contract throughout 2027 and with incentives has a maximum value of $60 million. In pregame warmups ahead of the Colts' Week 6 game against the Arizona Cardinals, Ward collided with teammate Drew Ogletree during pre-game warmups and suffered a concussion. He was placed on injured reserve on October 18. Ward was activated on November 22, ahead of the team's Week 12 matchup against the Kansas City Chiefs. He was placed back on injured reserve on December 10, after suffering his third concussion of the season.

== NFL career statistics ==
Legend
	Won the Super Bowl
	Led the league
**Bold**	Career high

=== Regular season ===
Year	Team	Games		Tackles				Interceptions						Fumbles			
Year	Team	GP	GS	Cmb	Solo	Ast	Sck	PD	Int	Yds	Avg	Lng	TD	FF	FR	Yds	TD
2018	KC	13	2	30	26	4	0.0	3	0	0	0.0	0	0	0	0	0	0
2019	KC	16	16	74	56	18	0.0	10	2	10	10.0	10	0	**1**	0	0	0
2020	KC	14	13	51	38	13	**1.0**	6	0	0	0.0	0	0	0	0	0	0
2021	KC	13	12	67	48	19	0.0	10	2	0	0.0	0	0	0	0	0	0
2022	SF	17	17	**87**	**59**	**38**	0.0	11	1	9	9.0	9	0	**1**	**1**	**40**	0
2023	SF	17	17	72	56	16	0.0	**23**	**5**	**91**	**18.2**	**66T**	**1**	**1**	0	0	0
2024	SF	12	12	54	38	16	0.0	7	0	0	0.0	0	0	0	0	0	0
2025	IND	7	7	25	17	8	0.0	7	0	0	0.0	0	0	0	**1**	0	0
2026	IND	10	10	30	18	12	0.0	8	0	0	0.0	0	0	0	0	0	0
Career		118	105	490	356	134	1.0	85	10	110	11.0	66T	1	3	2	40	0

=== Postseason ===
Year	Team	Games		Tackles				Interceptions			
Year	Team	GP	GS	Cmb	Solo	Ast	Sck	PD	Int	Yds	TD
2018	KC	2	1	11	6	**5**	—	**4**	—	—	—
2019	KC	3	3	9	7	2	—	1	—	—	—
2020	KC	3	3	**18**	**15**	3	—	1	—	—	—
2021	KC	3	3	16	12	4	—	3	—	—	—
2022	SF	3	3	13	12	1	—	3	—	—	—
2023	SF	3	3	10	8	2	—	1	—	—	—
Career		17	16	77	60	17	—	13	—	—	—

== Personal life ==
Ward prefers to go by his childhood nickname "Mooney", bestowed upon him by his mother. The origin of the name is not known by Ward or his mother. "Everybody in my family has got a nickname," he said. "Nobody gets called by their real name. It’s just a Mississippi thing, I guess."

Ward has had two children with his girlfriend, Monique Cook: Amani Joy (born November 7, 2022) and Charvarius Jr. (born on December 28, 2024). Amani was born prematurely and was diagnosed with Down syndrome, and had also dealt with heart issues throughout her life. She died at the age of 1, on October 28, 2024. Prior to Amani's surgery, Ward converted to Islam.
