= Louisburg High School (Kansas) =

Location
- 202 Aquatic Drive; Louisburg, Kansas 66053; United States
- Coordinates: 38.619603°N 94.666487°W

Information
- School type: Public, High School
- School board: Board website
- School district: Louisburg USD 416
- CEEB code: 171840
- Principal: Amy VanRheen
- Teaching staff: 38.45 (FTE)
- Grades: 9 to 12
- Gender: coed
- Enrollment: 540 (2023–2024)
- Student to teacher ratio: 14.04
- Campus type: Rural
- Colors: Purple; White
- Mascot: Wildcat
- Website: School Website

Louisburg High School is a public secondary school in Louisburg, Kansas, United States. It is the sole high school operated by Louisburg USD 416 school district. It serves students of grades 9 to 12 in the community of Louisburg and nearby rural areas.

== Extracurricular activities ==
The school colors are purple and white and the school mascot is the Wildcat.

=== Athletics ===
The Wildcats are classified as a 4A school, the third-largest classification in Kansas according to the Kansas State High School Activities Association. LHS competes In the Frontier League. In 2010, the Louisburg High School football team was undefeated and won the state championship. The boys track and field team won the 4A state championship in 2011 and 2021.

=== State championships ===
State Championships
Season	Sport	Number of Championships	Year
Fall	Football	1	2010
Spring	Golf, Boys	1	1977
Spring	Track & Field, Boys	2	2011, 2021
Total		4	

=== Marching Wildcat Band ===
The Louisburg High School Marching Wildcat Band has participated in many events, including the 2018 Rose Parade on New Year's Day in Pasadena, California.

== Notable alumni ==
- Class of 2012 - Garrett Griffin, former Air Force Academy tight end, played professionally for two National Football League teams
- Doug Shane, Kansas State Senator

== See also ==
- List of high schools in Kansas
- List of unified school districts in Kansas
