= Garrett Griffin =

American football player (born 1994)

No. 45, 86
- Position: Tight end

Personal information
- Born: March 4, 1994 (age 32); Louisburg, Kansas, U.S.
- Listed height: 6 ft 4 in (1.93 m)
- Listed weight: 246 lb (112 kg)

Career information
- High school: Louisburg
- College: Air Force (2012–2015)
- NFL draft: 2016: undrafted

Career history
- New Orleans Saints (2016–2021); Detroit Lions (2022)

Career NFL statistics
- Receptions: 5
- Receiving yards: 43
- Stats at Pro Football Reference

Garrett Griffin (born March 4, 1994) is an American former professional football player who was a tight end in the National Football League (NFL). He played college football for the Air Force Falcons.

== Early life ==
Raised in Louisburg, Kansas, Garrett attended Louisburg High School in Kansas. Garrett was a two-time state champion in the javelin and was a member of the 2010 4A Kansas state champion football team. He was coached by his father, Gary.

== College career ==
Garrett played college football at Air Force from 2012 to 2015 and finished his career with 41 catches for 678 yards and 8 touchdowns.

== Professional career ==
=== New Orleans Saints ===
Griffin was signed by the New Orleans Saints as an undrafted free agent on June 6, 2016. He was waived by the Saints on September 3, 2016, and was signed to the practice squad the next day. After spending the entire season on the practice squad, Griffin signed a reserve/future contract with the Saints on January 2, 2017.

On September 2, 2017, Griffin was waived by the Saints and was signed to the practice squad the next day. He was promoted to the active roster on December 2, 2017. He appeared in three games during December, making one catch for four yards. He was placed on injured reserve on January 3, 2018, with a foot injury.

On September 1, 2018, Griffin was waived by the Saints and was signed to the practice squad the next day. He was promoted to the active roster on January 12, 2019. Eight days later, he had his first career touchdown reception in the NFC Championship Game against the Los Angeles Rams.

Griffin was placed on injured reserve on August 26, 2019, with an ankle injury.

On September 5, 2020, Griffin waived by the Saints and signed to the practice squad the next day. He was elevated to the active roster on October 3 and October 12 for the team's weeks 4 and 5 games against the Detroit Lions and Los Angeles Chargers, and reverted to the practice squad after each game. He was signed to the active roster on November 21, 2020. On December 19, 2020, the Saints waived Griffin and re-signed him to their practice squad three days later. He was elevated again on January 2, 2021, for the week 17 game against the Carolina Panthers, and reverted to the practice squad again following the game. On January 18, 2021, Griffin signed a reserve/futures contract with the Saints.

On December 18, 2021, Griffin was placed on injured reserve.

=== Detroit Lions ===
On March 28, 2022, Griffin signed with the Detroit Lions. He was released on August 15, 2022. He was re-signed to the practice squad on August 31.
