= Keith Kirkwood =

American football player (born 1994)

Profile
- Position: Wide receiver

Personal information
- Born: December 26, 1994 (age 31); Neptune Township, New Jersey, U.S.
- Listed height: 6 ft 3 in (1.91 m)
- Listed weight: 210 lb (95 kg)

Career information
- High school: Neptune
- College: Hawaii (2013); Temple (2014–2017)
- NFL draft: 2018: undrafted

Career history
- New Orleans Saints (2018–2019); Carolina Panthers (2020–2021); New Orleans Saints (2022–2023); Baltimore Ravens (2024–2025)*
- * Offseason or practice squad member only

Career NFL statistics as of 2024
- Receptions: 24
- Receiving yards: 294
- Receiving touchdowns: 3
- Stats at Pro Football Reference

Keith Kirkwood (born December 26, 1994) is an American professional football wide receiver. He played college football for the Hawaii Rainbow Warriors and Temple Owls.

== Early life ==
Kirkwood was born and raised in Neptune Township, New Jersey. Kirkwood played both basketball and football at Neptune High School.

== College career ==
Kirkwood attended and played for Temple University after transferring from the University of Hawaii.

== Professional career ==
Pre-draft measurables
Height	Weight	Arm length	Hand span	40-yard dash	10-yard split	20-yard split	20-yard shuttle	Three-cone drill	Vertical jump	Broad jump
6 ft 2 1/2 in (1.89 m)	221 lb (100 kg)	33 3/4 in (0.86 m)	9 1/2 in (0.24 m)	4.45 s	1.63 s	2.66 s	4.43 s	6.94 s	35 in (0.89 m)	10 ft 5 in (3.18 m)
All values from Temple’s Pro Day

=== New Orleans Saints (first stint) ===
On May 1, 2018, the New Orleans Saints signed Kirkwood as an undrafted free agent to a three-year, $1.72 million contract that includes $42,000 guaranteed and a signing bonus of $17,000.

Throughout training camp, Kirkwood competed for a roster spot as a backup wide receiver against Austin Carr, Tommylee Lewis, Brandon Coleman, Josh Huff, Travin Dural, and Eldridge Massington. On September 1, 2018, the Saints waived Kirkwood as part of their final roster cuts, but signed him to their practice squad the following day after clearing waivers.

On November 10, 2018, the Saints promoted Kirkwood from their practice squad to their active roster after newly acquired free agent Dez Bryant tore his Achilles tendon during practice. The Saints placed multiple wide receivers on injured reserve after sustaining injuries, including Ted Ginn Jr., Tommylee Lewis, Travin Dural, and Cameron Meredith. Kirkwood became the fourth wide receiver on the depth chart upon joining the active roster, behind Michael Thomas, Tre'Quan Smith, and Austin Carr.

On November 11, 2018, Kirkwood made his professional regular season debut and caught two passes for 45 yards and made one tackle on special teams during a 51–14 victory at the Cincinnati Bengals in Week 10.

On September 17, 2019, Kirkwood was placed on injured reserve with a hamstring injury. He was designated for return from injured reserve on November 13, 2019, and began practicing with the team again. However, he was not activated by the end of the three-week practice window on December 4, 2019, and remained on injured reserve for the rest of the season.

=== Carolina Panthers ===
On April 1, 2020, Kirkwood signed with the Carolina Panthers, reuniting him with former Temple head coach Matt Rhule and former college teammates Robby Anderson, P. J. Walker, and Colin Thompson. Kirkwood was placed on injured reserve on September 7, due to a shoulder injury. He was designated for return from injured reserve on September 30, and began practicing with the team again. Kirkwood was activated on October 17, but re-injured his left clavicle in the next game and was placed back on injured reserve on October 20.

On February 22, 2021, Kirkwood signed a one-year contract extension with the Panthers. He was waived on August 31, and re-signed to the team's practice squad the next day. Ahead of the Week 8 game against the Atlanta Falcons, Kirkwood was promoted to the active roster.

On June 6, 2022, Kirkwood re-signed with the Panthers. He was released by Carolina on August 30.

=== New Orleans Saints (second stint) ===
On September 28, 2022, Kirkwood was signed to the Saints' practice squad. On October 15, Kirkwood was promoted to the team's active roster. He was released on October 29 and re-signed to the practice squad. Kirkwood was promoted on January 4, 2023. Kirkwood re-signed with the Saints on February 17.

=== Baltimore Ravens ===
On June 28, 2024, Kirkwood signed with the Baltimore Ravens. He was released by Baltimore during final roster cuts on August 27. Kirkwood re-signed with Baltimore on a practice squad pact the following day. He was elevated for the Ravens' season finale against the Pittsburgh Steelers. However, Kirkwood did not appear during the Steelers game, or in any games during the season. On February 19, 2025, Kirkwood re-signed with the Ravens.

On August 26, 2025, Kirkwood was released by the Ravens as part of final roster cuts and re-signed to the practice squad the next day.

== NFL career statistics ==
Legend
**Bold**	Career best

=== Regular season ===
Year	Team	Games		Receiving					Fumbles	
Year	Team	GP	GS	Rec	Yds	Avg	Lng	TD	Fum	Lost
2018	NO	8	1	**13**	**209**	**16.1**	**42**	**2**	0	0
2019	NO	1	0	0	0	0.0	0	0	0	0
2020	CAR	1	0	1	13	13.0	13	0	0	0
2021	CAR	3	0	3	17	5.7	7	0	0	0
2022	NO	5	1	2	18	9.0	14	0	0	0
2023	NO	**13**	**4**	5	37	7.4	13	1	0	0
Career		31	6	24	294	12.3	42	3	0	0

=== Postseason ===
Year	Team	Games		Receiving					Fumbles	
Year	Team	GP	GS	Rec	Yds	Avg	Lng	TD	Fum	Lost
2018	NO	**1**	**1**	**2**	**8**	**4.0**	**6**	**1**	**0**	**0**
Career		1	1	2	8	4.0	6	1	0	0
