= 2018 New Orleans Saints season =

NFL team season

- Owner: Gayle Benson
- General manager: Mickey Loomis
- Head coach: Sean Payton
- Offensive coordinator: Pete Carmichael Jr.
- Defensive coordinator: Dennis Allen
- Home stadium: Mercedes-Benz Superdome

Results
- Record: 13–3
- Division place: 1st NFC South
- Playoffs: Won Divisional Playoffs (vs. Eagles) 20–14; Lost NFC Championship (vs. Rams) 23–26 (OT)
- All-Pros: 5: WR Michael Thomas (1st team); QB Drew Brees (2nd team); LT Terron Armstead (2nd team); RT Ryan Ramczyk (2nd team); DE Cameron Jordan (2nd team)
- Pro Bowlers: 8: QB Drew Brees; RB Alvin Kamara; WR Michael Thomas; T Terron Armstead; G Andrus Peat; G Larry Warford; C Max Unger; DE Cameron Jordan

Uniform
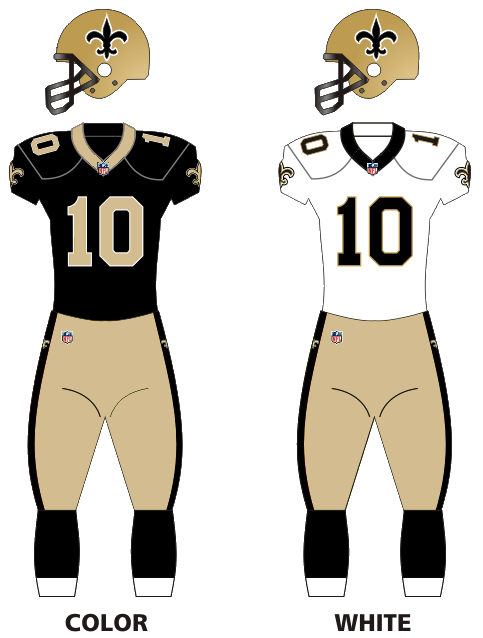

The 2018 season was the New Orleans Saints' 52nd in the National Football League (NFL), their 43rd at the Mercedes-Benz Superdome and their 12th under head coach Sean Payton.

This season was the first since 1984 without owner Tom Benson, who died in March. In Week 11, the Saints defeated the Philadelphia Eagles to reach their first nine-game winning streak since their Super Bowl winning season in 2009, ensuring they clinched their second consecutive winning season for the first time since 2010–2011. They swept their division rivals, the Atlanta Falcons, after a 31–17 victory on Thanksgiving night for the first time since 2015 while extending their second longest winning streak in franchise history to 10 games, which came to an end when the Saints lost to the Dallas Cowboys 13–10, on November 29. On December 9, the Saints clinched their second straight NFC South division championship when they defeated the Tampa Bay Buccaneers, their first back-to-back division titles in franchise history. On December 17, after beating the Carolina Panthers, the Saints improved on their 11–5 record from 2017. After a Week 16 win over the Pittsburgh Steelers, the Saints clinched home field advantage throughout the playoffs for the first time since 2009. The Saints finished the season with a 13–3 record, tied for the most wins in a season in franchise history.

In the playoffs, the Saints defeated the defending Super Bowl champion Philadelphia Eagles 20–14 in the Divisional Round. However, the Saints' season came to an end in a 26–23 overtime loss to the Los Angeles Rams in the NFC Championship Game in controversial fashion, which ended their hopes of returning to the Super Bowl for the first time since Super Bowl XLIV. Additionally, it marked the first time since 1992 that the Saints lost a postseason game at home.

== Draft ==
2018 New Orleans Saints Draft
Round	Selection	Player	Position	College
1	14	Marcus Davenport	DE	UTSA
3	91	Tre'Quan Smith	WR	UCF
4	127	Rick Leonard	OT	FSU
5	164	Natrell Jamerson	S	Wisconsin
6	189	Kamrin Moore	CB	Boston College
6	201	Boston Scott	RB	Louisiana Tech
7	245	Will Clapp	C	LSU

Notes

- The Saints traded their 2018 first-round selection (27th overall), along with their 2019 first-round selection to the Green Bay Packers in exchange for the 14th overall selection.
- The Saints received a 2018 sixth-round selection (189th overall) from the Arizona Cardinals in exchange for running back Adrian Peterson.

== Staff ==
2018 New Orleans Saints staff
Front office: Owner – Gayle Benson; President – Dennis Lauscha; Executive vice president/general manager – Mickey Loomis; Asst general manager/college scouting director – Jeff Ireland; Vice president of football administration – Khai Harley; Director of operations – James Nagaoka; Director of pro scouting – Terry Fontenot; Head coaches: Head coach – Sean Payton; Assistant head coach/tight ends – Dan Campbell; Assistant to the head coach – Kevin Petry; Offensive coaches: Offensive coordinator – Pete Carmichael; Quarterbacks – Joe Lombardi; Running backs – Joel Thomas; Wide receivers – Ronald Curry; Offensive line – Dan Roushar; Assistant offensive line – Brendan Nugent; Senior offensive assistant – Curtis Johnson; Offensive assistant – Joe Brady	Defensive coaches: Defensive coordinator – Dennis Allen; Defensive line – Ryan Nielsen; Linebackers – Mike Nolan; Secondary – Aaron Glenn; Senior defensive assistant – Peter Giunta; Defensive assistant/linebackers – Michael Hodges; Defensive assistant – Leigh Torrence; Pass rush specialist – Brian Young; Special teams coaches: Special teams coordinator – Bradford Banta; Special teams coach – Mike Westhoff; Assistant special teams – Kevin O'Dea; Coaching assistant – Deuce Schwartz; Strength and conditioning: Head strength and conditioning – Dan Dalrymple; Assistant strength and conditioning – Charles Byrd; Assistant strength and conditioning – Rob Wenning

== Final roster ==
2018 New Orleans Saints roster
Quarterbacks (QB): 9 Drew Brees; 5 Teddy Bridgewater; 7 Taysom Hill; Running backs (RB): 22 Mark Ingram; 41 Alvin Kamara; 42 Zach Line FB; 27 Dwayne Washington; Wide receivers (WR): 80 Austin Carr; 15 Simmie Cobbs; 19 Ted Ginn Jr.; 18 Keith Kirkwood; 11 Tommylee Lewis; 10 Tre'Quan Smith; 13 Michael Thomas; Tight ends (TE): 85 Dan Arnold; 89 Josh Hill; 82 Ben Watson	Offensive linemen (OL): 72 Terron Armstead T; 74 Jermon Bushrod T; 64 Will Clapp G; 78 Cornelius Lucas T; 77 Derek Newton T; 75 Andrus Peat G; 71 Ryan Ramczyk T; 63 Cameron Tom C; 60 Max Unger C; 67 Larry Warford G; Defensive linemen (DL): 92 Marcus Davenport DE; 95 Tyeler Davison DT; 91 Trey Hendrickson DE; 94 Cameron Jordan DE; 57 Alex Okafor DE; 93 David Onyemata DT; 98 Sheldon Rankins DT; 76 Taylor Stallworth DT	Linebackers (LB): 47 Alex Anzalone MLB; 59 Vince Biegel OLB; 56 Demario Davis OLB; 53 A. J. Klein OLB; 52 Craig Robertson OLB; 51 Manti Te'o MLB; Defensive backs (DB): 25 Eli Apple CB; 31 Chris Banjo FS; 24 Vonn Bell SS; 29 Kurt Coleman SS; 20 Ken Crawley CB; 34 Justin Hardee CB; 23 Marshon Lattimore CB; 43 Marcus Williams FS; 26 P. J. Williams CB; Special teams (ST): 3 Wil Lutz K; 6 Thomas Morstead P; 49 Zach Wood LS	Practice squad: 16 J. T. Barrett QB; 28 Christian Campbell CB; 48 J. T. Gray SS; 45 Garrett Griffin TE; 69 Alex Jenkins DE ^{Int'l}; 99 Tomasi Laulile DT; 37 Arthur Maulet CB; 44 Darnell Sankey OLB; 66 Isaiah Williams G; 79 Nate Wozniak T; 17 Shane Wynn WR; Reserve: 90 Jay Bromley DT (IR); 88 Dez Bryant WR (IR); 14 Travin Dural WR (IR); 84 Michael Hoomanawanui TE (IR); 46 Rickey Jefferson SS (IR); 36 Daniel Lasco RB (PUP); 61 Josh LeRibeus G (IR); 81 Cameron Meredith WR (IR); 65 Michael Ola T (IR); 21 Patrick Robinson CB (IR); Rookies in italics 53 active, 10 reserve, 11 practice squad

== Preseason ==
Week	Date	Opponent	Result	Record	Game site	NFL.com recap
1	August 9	at Jacksonville Jaguars	W 24–20	1–0	TIAA Bank Field	Recap
2	August 17	Arizona Cardinals	L 15–20	1–1	Mercedes-Benz Superdome	Recap
3	August 25	at Los Angeles Chargers	W 36–7	2–1	StubHub Center	Recap
4	August 30	Los Angeles Rams	W 28–0	3–1	Mercedes-Benz Superdome	Recap

== Regular season ==
=== Schedule ===
The Saints' 2018 schedule was released on April 19.

Week	Date	Opponent	Result	Record	Game site	NFL.com recap
1	September 9	**Tampa Bay Buccaneers**	**L** 40–48	0–1	Mercedes-Benz Superdome	Recap
2	September 16	Cleveland Browns	**W** 21–18	1–1	Mercedes-Benz Superdome	Recap
3	September 23	at **Atlanta Falcons**	**W** 43–37 (OT)	2–1	Mercedes-Benz Stadium	Recap
4	September 30	at New York Giants	**W** 33–18	3–1	MetLife Stadium	Recap
5	October 8	Washington Redskins	**W** 43–19	4–1	Mercedes-Benz Superdome	Recap
6	Bye					
7	October 21	at Baltimore Ravens	**W** 24–23	5–1	M&T Bank Stadium	Recap
8	October 28	at Minnesota Vikings	**W** 30–20	6–1	U.S. Bank Stadium	Recap
9	November 4	Los Angeles Rams	**W** 45–35	7–1	Mercedes-Benz Superdome	Recap
10	November 11	at Cincinnati Bengals	**W** 51–14	8–1	Paul Brown Stadium	Recap
11	November 18	Philadelphia Eagles	**W** 48–7	9–1	Mercedes-Benz Superdome	Recap
12	November 22	**Atlanta Falcons**	**W** 31–17	10–1	Mercedes-Benz Superdome	Recap
13	November 29	at Dallas Cowboys	**L** 10–13	10–2	AT&T Stadium	Recap
14	December 9	at **Tampa Bay Buccaneers**	**W** 28–14	11–2	Raymond James Stadium	Recap
15	December 17	at **Carolina Panthers**	**W** 12–9	12–2	Bank of America Stadium	Recap
16	December 23	Pittsburgh Steelers	**W** 31–28	13–2	Mercedes-Benz Superdome	Recap
17	December 30	**Carolina Panthers**	**L** 14–33	13–3	Mercedes-Benz Superdome	Recap

Note: Intra-division opponents are in bold text.

=== Game summaries ===
==== Week 1: vs. Tampa Bay Buccaneers ====
Week One: Tampa Bay Buccaneers at New Orleans Saints – Game summary

Quarter	1	2	3	4	Total
**Buccaneers**	14	17	10	7	**48**
Saints	10	14	0	16	**40**

at Mercedes-Benz Superdome, New Orleans, Louisiana

- Date: September 9
- Game time: 12:00 p.m. CDT
- Game weather: Played indoors (dome stadium)
- Game attendance: 73,038
- Referee: John Parry
- TV announcers (Fox): Chris Myers, Daryl Johnston and Laura Okmin
- Recap, Gamebook

Game information

First quarter

- NO – Alvin Kamara 5-yard run (Lutz kick) Saints 7-0 **Drive 6 plays, 71 yards, 3:19.**
- TB – DeSean Jackson 58-yard pass from Ryan Fitzpatrick (Catanzaro kick) Tied 7–7 **Drive 4 plays, 58 yards, 2:00.**
- NO – Wil Lutz 36-yard field goal Saints 10-7 **Drive 11 plays, 58 yards, 5:16.**
- TB – Ryan Fitzpatrick 3-yard run (Catanzaro kick) Buccaneers 14-10 **Drive 6 plays, 75 yards, 2:27.**

Second quarter

- NO – Ted Ginn 28-yard pass from Drew Brees (Lutz kick) Saints 17-14 **Drive 4 plays, 74 yards, 2:04.**
- TB – Chandler Catanzaro 33-yard field goal Tied 17-17 **Drive 8 plays, 60 yards, 3:42.**
- TB – Chris Godwin 9-yard pass from Ryan Fitzpatrick (Catanzaro kick) Buccaneers 24-17 **Drive 10 plays, 78 yards, 5:00.**
- TB – Justin Evans 34-yard fumble return (Catanzaro kick) Buccaneers 31-17
- NO – Michael Thomas 6-yard pass from Drew Brees (Lutz kick) Buccaneers 31-24 **Drive 9 plays, 75 yards, 3:32.**

Third quarter

- TB – Chandler Catanzaro 36-yard field goal Buccaneers 34-24 **Drive 9 plays, 57 yards, 3:36.**
- TB – Mike Evans 50-yard pass from Ryan Fitzpatrick (Catanzaro kick) Buccaneers 41-24 **Drive 4 plays, 74 yards, 2:10.**

Fourth quarter

- TB – DeSean Jackson 36-yard pass from Ryan Fitzpatrick (Catanzaro kick) Buccaneers 48-24 **Drive 6 plays, 65 yards, 3:07.**
- NO – Alvin Kamara 1-yard run (Kamara run) Buccaneers 48-32 **Drive 10 plays, 75 yards, 3:25.**
- NO – Alvin Kamara 7-yard pass from Drew Brees (Ginn pass from Brees) Buccaneers 48-40 **Drive 5 plays, 66 yards, 1:21.**

Top passers

- TB – Ryan Fitzpatrick – 21/28, 417 yards, 4 TD, 0 INT
- NO – Drew Brees – 37/45, 439 yards, 3 TD, 0 INT

Top rushers

- TB – Peyton Barber – 19 carries, 69 yards
- NO – Alvin Kamara – 9 carries, 29 yards, 2 TD

Top receivers

- TB – Mike Evans – 7 receptions, 147 yards, 1 TD
- NO – Michael Thomas – 16 receptions, 180 yards, 1 TD

With their second straight loss to the Buccaneers, the Saints started their season off with 0-1.

==== Week 2: vs. Cleveland Browns ====
Week Two: Cleveland Browns at New Orleans Saints – Game summary

Quarter	1	2	3	4	Total
Browns	3	3	6	6	**18**
**Saints**	3	0	0	18	**21**

at Mercedes-Benz Superdome, New Orleans, Louisiana

- Date: September 16
- Game time: 12:00 pm. CDT
- Game weather: Played indoors (dome stadium)
- Game attendance: 73,086
- Referee: Ronald Torbert
- TV announcers (Fox): Chris Myers, Daryl Johnston and Laura Okmin
- Recap, Gamebook

Game information

**First quarter**

- CLE – Zane Gonzalez 39-yard field goal, 8:29. Browns 3–0. **Drive: 6 plays, 25 yards, 3:02.**
- NO – Wil Lutz 31-yard field goal, 2:47. Tied 3–3. **Drive: 11 plays, 63 yards, 5:42.**

**Second quarter**

- CLE – Zane Gonzalez 39-yard field goal, 1:55. Browns 6–3. **Drive: 7 plays, 45 yards, 2:21.**

**Third quarter**

- CLE – Carlos Hyde 1-yard run (PAT no good), 6:43. Browns 12–3. **Drive: 12 plays, 79 yards, 6:27.**

**Fourth quarter**

- NO – Michael Thomas 2-yard pass from Drew Brees (Wil Lutz kick), 8:41. Browns 12–10. **Drive: 9 plays, 66 yards, 5:35.**
- NO – Michael Thomas 5-yard pass from Drew Brees (Alvin Kamara run for two-point conversion), 2:40. Saints 18–12. **Drive: 4 plays, 18 yards, 2:17.**
- CLE – Antonio Callaway 47-yard pass from Tyrod Taylor (PAT no good), 1:16. Tied 18–18. **Drive: 6 plays, 75 yards, 1:24.**
- NO – Wil Lutz 44-yard field goal, 0:21. Saints 21–18. **Drive: 6 plays, 49 yards, 0:55.**

**Top passers**

- CLE – Tyrod Taylor – 22/30, 246 yards, TD, INT
- NO – Drew Brees – 28/35, 243 yards, 2 TD

**Top rushers**

- CLE – Carlos Hyde – 16 carries, 43 yards, TD
- NO – Alvin Kamara – 13 carries, 46 yards

**Top receivers**

- CLE – Antonio Callaway – 3 receptions, 81 yards, TD
- NO – Michael Thomas – 12 receptions, 89 yards, 2 TD

With the win against the Browns, they improved to 1-1.

==== Week 3: at Atlanta Falcons ====
Week Three: New Orleans Saints at Atlanta Falcons – Game summary

Quarter	1	2	3	4	OT	Total
**Saints**	7	9	7	14	6	**43**
Falcons	7	7	7	16	0	**37**

at Mercedes-Benz Stadium, Atlanta, Georgia

- Date: September 23
- Game time: 1:00 p.m. EDT/12:00 pm. CDT
- Game weather: Played indoors (retractable roof closed)
- Game attendance: 74,457
- Referee: Walt Anderson
- TV announcers (Fox): Sam Rosen, Cris Carter and Sara Walsh
- Recap, Gamebook

Game information

**First quarter**

- NO – Ted Ginn Jr. 4-yard pass from Drew Brees (Wil Lutz kick), 11:45. Saints 7–0. **Drive: 6 plays, 75 yards, 3:15.**
- ATL – Calvin Ridley 18-yard pass from Matt Ryan (Matt Bryant kick), 2:45. Tied 7–7. **Drive: 12 plays, 81 yards, 6:06.**

**Second quarter**

- NO – Wil Lutz 49-yard field goal, 9:37. Saints 10–7. **Drive: 6 plays, 31 yards, 2:21.**
- NO – Wil Lutz 21-yard field goal, 3:06. Saints 13–7. **Drive: 8 plays, 70 yards, 4:46.**
- ATL – Calvin Ridley 75-yard pass from Matt Ryan (Matt Bryant kick), 2:12. Falcons 14–13. **Drive: 2 plays, 75 yards, 0:54.**
- NO – Wil Lutz 45-yard field goal, 0:06. Saints 16–14. **Drive: 3 plays, 31 yards, 0:34.**

**Third quarter**

- ATL – Calvin Ridley 9-yard pass from Matt Ryan (Matt Bryant kick), 12:00. Falcons 21–16. **Drive: 6 plays, 75 yards, 3:00.**

**Fourth quarter**

- NO – Cameron Meredith 11-yard pass from Drew Brees (Wil Lutz kick), 6:07. Saints 23–21. **Drive: 4 plays, 16 yards, 2:29.**
- ATL – Tevin Coleman 5-yard pass from Matt Ryan (Matt Ryan-Austin Hooper pass), 14:11. Falcons 29–23. **Drive: 12 plays, 82 yards, 6:56.**
- NO – Zach Line 1-yard pass from Drew Brees (Wil Lutz kick), 9:59. Saints 30–29. **Drive: 8 plays, 75 yards, 4:12.**
- ATL – Mohamed Sanu 5-yard pass from Matt Ryan (Matt Ryan-Mohamed Sanu pass), 6:56. Falcons 37–30. **Drive: 5 plays, 75 yards, 3:01.**
- NO – Drew Brees 7-yard run (Wil Lutz kick), 1:15. Tied 37–37. **Drive: 11 plays, 81 yards, 5:43.**

**Overtime**

- NO – Drew Brees 1-yard run, 2:55. Saints 43–37. **Drive: 15 plays, 80 yards, 7:05.**

**Top passers**

- NO – Drew Brees – 39/49, 396 yards, 3 TD
- ATL – Matt Ryan – 26/35, 374 yards, 5 TD

**Top rushers**

- NO – Alvin Kamara – 16 carries, 66 yards
- ATL – Tevin Coleman – 15 carries, 33 yards

**Top receivers**

- NO – Alvin Kamara – 15 receptions, 124 yards
- ATL – Calvin Ridley – 7 receptions, 146 yards, 3 TD

In this game, both teams tied in the 4th quarter, resulting in a Saints victory against the Falcons in overtime. They improved to 2-1.

==== Week 4: at New York Giants ====
Week Four: New Orleans Saints at New York Giants – Game summary

Quarter	1	2	3	4	Total
**Saints**	0	12	7	14	**33**
Giants	7	0	3	8	**18**

at MetLife Stadium, East Rutherford, New Jersey

- Date: September 30
- Game time: 4:25 pm. EDT/3:25 pm. CDT
- Game weather: 71 °F (22 °C), partly cloudy
- Game attendance: 78,213
- Referee: Pete Morelli
- TV announcers (CBS): Jim Nantz, Tony Romo and Tracy Wolfson
- Recap, Gamebook

Game information

**First quarter**

- NYG – Sterling Shepard 2-yard TD pass from Eli Manning. (Aldrick Rosas kick), 8:42. Giants 7–0. **Drive: 10 plays, 75 yards, 4:59.**

**Second quarter**

- NO – Wil Lutz – 42-yard field goal, 14:55. Giants 7–3. **Drive: 15 plays, 51 yards, 8:29.**
- NO – Wil Lutz – 34 yard field goal, 7:18. Giants 7–6 **Drive: 9 plays, 69 yards, 3:31.**
- NO – Wil Lutz – 37 yard field goal, 3:36. Saints 9–7 **Drive: 4 plays, -8 yards, 0:57.**
- NO – Wil Lutz – 26 yard field goal, 0:11. Saints 12–7 **Drive: 7 plays, 40 yards, 2:21.**

**Third quarter**

- NO – Alvin Kamara – 9-yard TD run. (Wil Lutz kick), 7:16. Saints 19–7. **Drive: 7 plays, 80 yards, 3:17.**
- NYG – Aldrick Rosas – 33 yard field goal, 2:02. Saints 19–10. **Drive: 10 plays, 75 yards, 5:14.**

**Fourth quarter**

- NO – Alvin Kamara – 4 yard TD run. (Wil Lutz kick), 6:47. Saints 26–10. **Drive: 14 plays, 74 yards, 6:39.**
- NYG – Saquon Barkley – 1 yard TD run. (Eli Manning pass to Sterling Shepard for two-point conversion), 3:44. Saints 26–18. **Drive: 10 plays, 75 yards, 3:03.**
- NO – Alvin Kamara – 49 yard TD run. (Wil Lutz kick), 2:06. Saints 33–18. **Drive: 6 plays, 97 yards, 1:38.**

**Top passers**

- NO – Drew Brees – 18/32, 217 yards
- NYG – Eli Manning – 31/41, 255 yards, 1 TD

**Top rushers**

- NO – Alvin Kamara – 19 rushes, 134 yards, 3 TD
- NYG – Saquon Barkley – 10 rushes, 44 yards, 1 TD

**Top receivers**

- NO – Josh Hill – 3 receptions, 63 yards
- NYG – Sterling Shepard – 10 receptions, 77 yards, 1 TD

The Saints played at the Giants for the first time since 2016. In the 1st quarter, they trailed by 7, but for the remainder of the game, they were able to make a comeback against them. Therefore, they won this game and brought their record to 3-1.

==== Week 5: vs. Washington Redskins ====
Week Five: Washington Redskins at New Orleans Saints – Game summary

Quarter	1	2	3	4	Total
Redskins	3	10	0	6	**19**
**Saints**	6	20	14	3	**43**

at Mercedes-Benz Superdome, New Orleans, Louisiana

- Date: October 8
- Game time: 7:15 pm. CDT
- Game weather: Played indoors (dome stadium)
- Game attendance: 73,028
- Referee: Carl Cheffers
- TV announcers (ESPN/WDSU): Joe Tessitore, Jason Witten, Booger McFarland and Lisa Salters
- Recap, Gamebook

Game information

**First quarter**

- NO – Mark Ingram II 2-yard run (kick failed), 10:41. Saints 6–0. **Drive: 6 plays, 64 yards, 3:13.**
- WAS – Dustin Hopkins 37-yard field goal, 2:37. Saints 6–3. **Drive: 15 plays, 56 yards, 8:04.**

**Second quarter**

- NO – Josh Hill 1-yard pass from Drew Brees (Wil Lutz kick), 10:38. Saints 13–3. **Drive: 13 plays, 75 yards, 6:59.**
- WAS – Dustin Hopkins 53-yard field goal, 8:36. Saints 13–6. **Drive: 6 plays, 40 yards, 2:02.**
- NO – Mark Ingram II 1-yard run (Wil Lutz kick), 3:43. Saints 20–6. **Drive: 10 plays, 75 yards, 4:53.**
- NO – Tre'Quan Smith 62-yard pass from Drew Brees (run failed), 2:36. Saints 26–6. **Drive: 1 plays, 62 yards, 0:10.**
- WAS – Alex Smith 4-yard run (Dustin Hopkins kick), 0:26. Saints 26–13. **Drive: 3 plays, 16 yards, 0:56.**

**Third quarter**

- NO – Tre'Quan Smith 35-yard pass from Drew Brees (Wil Lutz kick), 12:23. Saints 33–13. **Drive: 5 plays, 74 yards, 2:37.**
- NO – Taysom Hill 1-yard run (Wil Lutz kick), 6:43. Saints 40–13. **Drive: 2 plays, 4 yards, 1:00.**

**Fourth quarter**

- NO – Wil Lutz 44-yard field goal, 14:10. Saints 43–13. **Drive: 6 plays, 22 yards, 3:09.**
- WAS – Kapri Bibbs 1-yard run (pass failed), 10:25. Saints 43–19. **Drive: 7 plays, 75 yards, 3:42.**

**Top passers**

- WAS – Alex Smith – 23/39, 275 yards, 1 INT
- NO – Drew Brees – 26/29, 363 yards, 3 TD

**Top rushers**

- WAS – Chris Thompson – 8 carries, 17 yards
- NO – Mark Ingram II – 16 carries, 53 yards, 2 TD

**Top receivers**

- WAS – Chris Thompson – 6 receptions, 45 yards
- NO – Cameron Meredith – 5 receptions, 71 yards

This game was one year removed from last season, where the Saints overcame a 15-point deficit against the Redskins at home with three minutes remaining. This time, the Saints dominated the entire game. This game marked Drew Brees passing Brett Favre and Peyton Manning on most passing yards. The win improved the Saints to 4-1.

==== Week 7: at Baltimore Ravens ====
Week Seven: New Orleans Saints at Baltimore Ravens – Game summary

Quarter	1	2	3	4	Total
**Saints**	0	7	0	17	**24**
Ravens	0	10	7	6	**23**

at M&T Bank Stadium, Baltimore, Maryland

- Date: October 21
- Game time: 4:05 pm. EDT/3:05 pm. CDT
- Game weather: 54 °F (12 °C), partly sunny
- Game attendance: 70,639
- Referee: John Parry
- TV announcers (Fox): Chris Myers, Daryl Johnston and Laura Okmin
- Recap, Gamebook

Game information

First quarter

- No scoring plays.

Second quarter

- BAL – Justin Tucker 31-yard field goal, 6:04. Ravens 3–0. **Drive: 17 plays, 63 yards, 7:23.**
- NO – Benjamin Watson 1-yard pass from Drew Brees (Wil Lutz kick), 1:53. Saints 7–3. **Drive: 8 plays, 75 yards, 4:11.**
- BAL – Lamar Jackson 1-yard run (Justin Tucker kick), 0:04. Ravens 10–7. **Drive: 6 plays, 75 yards, 1:49.**

Third quarter

- BAL – Mark Andrews 8-yard pass from Joe Flacco (Justin Tucker kick), 3:30. Ravens 17–7. **Drive: 10 plays, 61 yards, 4:02.**

Fourth quarter

- NO – Alvin Kamara 2-yard run (Wil Lutz kick), 12:32. Ravens 17–14. **Drive: 12 plays, 75 yards, 5:58.**
- NO – Michael Thomas 5-yard pass from Drew Brees (Wil Lutz kick), 4:58. Saints 21–17. **Drive: 12 plays, 56 yards, 6:18.**
- NO – Wil Lutz 39-yard field goal, 2:07. Saints 24–17. **Drive: 7 plays, 43 yards, 1:12.**
- BAL – John Brown 14-yard pass from Joe Flacco (kick failed), 0:24. Saints 24–23. **Drive: 6 plays, 81 yards, 1:43.**

**Top passers**

- NO – Drew Brees – 22/30, 212 yards, 2 TD
- BAL – Joe Flacco – 23/39, 279 yards, 2 TD

**Top rushers**

- NO – Alvin Kamara – 17 carries, 64 yards, 1 TD
- BAL – Alex Collins – 11 carries, 38 yards

**Top receivers**

- NO – Michael Thomas – 7 receptions, 69 yards, 1 TD
- BAL – John Brown – 7 receptions, 134 yards, 1 TD

Drew Brees would throw his 500th touchdown pass against Baltimore and becoming the third quarterback in modern NFL history to defeat all 32 teams playing in the 2018 season – after Peyton Manning and Brett Favre. In doing so, he improved his record against the Ravens to 1-4. This also marked the Saints' one point victory over the Ravens, since Justin Tucker missed the extra point which was a nod to John Carney's missed PAT in a 2003 matchup against the Jacksonville Jaguars.

==== Week 8: at Minnesota Vikings ====
Week Eight: New Orleans Saints at Minnesota Vikings – Game summary

Quarter	1	2	3	4	Total
**Saints**	7	10	10	3	**30**
Vikings	7	6	0	7	**20**

at U.S. Bank Stadium, Minneapolis, Minnesota

- Date: October 28
- Game time: 7:20 pm. CDT
- Game weather: Played indoors (dome stadium)
- Game attendance: 66,801
- Referee: Craig Wrolstad
- TV announcers (NBC): Al Michaels, Cris Collinsworth, Michele Tafoya and Terry McAulay
- Recap, Gamebook

Game information

**First quarter**

- NO – Alvin Kamara 3-yard pass from Drew Brees (Wil Lutz kick), 10:33. Saints 7–0. **Drive: 8 plays, 81 yards, 4:27.**
- MIN – Stefon Diggs 1-yard pass from Kirk Cousins (Dan Bailey kick), 3:16. Tied 7–7. **Drive: 13 plays, 91 yards, 7:17.**

**Second quarter**

- MIN – Latavius Murray 1-yard run (kick failed, wide left), 11:57. Vikings 13–7. **Drive: 7 plays, 80 yards, 4:05.**
- NO – Wil Lutz 52-yard field goal, 7:27. Vikings 13–10. **Drive: 8 plays, 33 yards, 4:30.**
- NO – Alvin Kamara 1-yard run (Wil Lutz kick), 0:30. Saints 17–13. **Drive: 2 plays, 18 yards, 0:27.**

**Third quarter**

- NO – Wil Lutz 42-yard field goal, 8:19. Saints 20–13. **Drive: 9 plays, 21 yards, 4:09.**
- NO – P. J. Williams 45-yard interception return (Wil Lutz kick), 5:58. Saints 27–13.

**Fourth quarter**

- NO – Wil Lutz 42-yard field goal, 9:35. Saints 30–13. **Drive: 15 plays, 60 yards, 8:15.**
- MIN – Adam Thielen 1-yard pass from Kirk Cousins (Dan Bailey kick), 4:26. Saints 30–20. **Drive: 13 plays, 75 yards, 5:09.**

**Top passers**

- NO – Drew Brees – 18/23, 120 yards, TD, INT
- MIN – Kirk Cousins – 31/41, 359 yards, 2 TD, INT

**Top rushers**

- NO – Mark Ingram II – 13 rushes, 63 yards
- MIN – Latavius Murray – 13 rushes, 56 yards, TD

**Top receivers**

- NO – Michael Thomas – 5 receptions, 81 yards
- MIN – Stefon Diggs – 10 receptions, 119 yards, TD

The Saints travelled to Minnesota for the first time since the 2017 Divisional round; during which safety Marcus Williams missed a tackle on the game's final play that allowed a 61-yard game-winning touchdown reception by Stefon Diggs. In this divisional round rematch, despite a good offensive showing from Kirk Cousins and Stefon Diggs, and Drew Brees who was held to just 120 passing yards, New Orleans still won the game 30-20 to go to 6-1 and avenge their aforementioned playoff loss.

==== Week 9: vs. Los Angeles Rams ====
Week Nine: Los Angeles Rams at New Orleans Saints – Game summary

Quarter	1	2	3	4	Total
Rams	7	10	10	8	**35**
**Saints**	14	21	0	10	**45**

at Mercedes-Benz Superdome, New Orleans, Louisiana

- Date: November 4
- Game time: 3:25 pm. CST
- Game weather: Played indoors (dome stadium)
- Game attendance: 73,086
- Referee: Bill Vinovich
- TV announcers (Fox): Joe Buck, Troy Aikman and Erin Andrews
- Preview, Gamebook

Game information

**First quarter**

- NO – Alvin Kamara 11-yard run (Wil Lutz kick), 9:25. Saints 7–0. **Drive: 10 plays, 75 yards, 5:35.**
- LAR – Todd Gurley 8-yard run (Greg Zuerlein kick), 6:04. Tied 7–7. **Drive: 6 plays, 71 yards, 3:21.**
- NO – Alvin Kamara 16-yard pass from Drew Brees (Wil Lutz kick), 1:40. Saints 14–7. **Drive: 8 plays, 75 yards, 4:24.**

**Second quarter**

- LAR – Brandin Cooks 4-yard pass from Jared Goff (Greg Zuerlein kick), 14:12. Tied 14–14. **Drive: 6 plays, 75 yards, 2:28.**
- NO – Tre'Quan Smith 4-yard pass from Drew Brees (Wil Lutz kick), 7:35. Saints 21–14. **Drive: 10 plays, 87 yards, 5:31.**
- NO – Benjamin Watson 13-yard pass from Drew Brees (Wil Lutz kick), 1:06. Saints 28–14. **Drive: 6 plays, 59 yards, 2:24.**
- NO – Alvin Kamara 1-yard run (Wil Lutz kick), 0:26. Saints 35–14. **Drive: 6 plays, 34 yards, 0:33.**
- LAR – Greg Zuerlein 56-yard field goal, 0:00. Saints 35–17. **Drive: 5 plays, 37 yards, 0:26.**

**Third quarter**

- LAR – Malcolm Brown 18-yard pass from Jared Goff (Greg Zuerlein kick), 9:38. Saints 35–24. **Drive: 11 plays, 77 yards, 5:22.**
- LAR – Greg Zuerlein 34-yard field goal, 1:30. Saints 35–27. **Drive: 9 plays, 68 yards, 3:56.**

**Fourth quarter**

- LAR – Cooper Kupp 41-yard pass from Jared Goff (Jared Goff-Gerald Everett pass), 9:48. Tied 35–35. **Drive: 6 plays, 83 yards, 3:39.**
- NO – Wil Lutz 54-yard field goal, 6:23. Saints 38–35. **Drive: 9 plays, 40 yards, 3:23.**
- NO – Michael Thomas 72-yard pass from Drew Brees (Wil Lutz kick), 3:52. Saints 45–35. **Drive: 3 plays, 75 yards, 0:58.**

**Top passers**

- LAR – Jared Goff – 28/40, 391 yards, 3 TD, 1 INT
- NO – Drew Brees – 25/36, 346 yards, 4 TD

**Top rushers**

- LAR – Todd Gurley – 13 carries, 68 yards, 1 TD
- NO – Alvin Kamara – 19 carries, 82 yards, 2 TD

**Top receivers**

- LAR – Brandin Cooks – 6 receptions, 114 yards, 1 TD
- NO – Michael Thomas – 12 receptions, 211 yards, 1 TD

With the victory, the Saints extended their winning streak to 7 games (Starting from week 2) and ended Rams 8-game win streak. Star wide receiver Michael Thomas, after scoring on his 12th reception, paid homage to former Saints wide receiver Joe Horn; while simultaneously taunting former teammate Brandin Cooks and the Rams by pulling out a cell phone from underneath the goalpost pretending to imitate making a phone call. This celebration drew a 15-yard unsportsmanlike conduct penalty, enraging the Rams sideline. This was also the final victory over the Rams, who eventually beat them in the playoffs and one season after that.

==== Week 10: at Cincinnati Bengals ====
Week Ten: New Orleans Saints at Cincinnati Bengals – Game summary

Quarter	1	2	3	4	Total
**Saints**	7	28	10	6	**51**
Bengals	7	0	0	7	**14**

at Paul Brown Stadium, Cincinnati, Ohio

- Date: November 11
- Game time: 12:00 pm. CST/1:00 pm. EST
- Game weather: 39 °F (4 °C), mostly sunny
- Game attendance: 52,492
- Referee: Tony Corrente
- TV announcers (Fox): Kevin Burkhardt, Charles Davis and Pam Oliver
- Recap, Gamebook

Game information

First quarter

- NO – Michael Thomas 7-yard pass from Drew Brees (Wil Lutz kick), 6:30. Saints 7–0. **Drive: 15 plays, 75 yards, 8:30.**
- CIN – John Ross 2-yard pass from Andy Dalton (Randy Bullock kick), 1:56. Tied 7–7. **Drive: 8 plays, 75 yards, 4:34.**

Second quarter

- NO – Mark Ingram II 28-yard pass from Drew Brees (Wil Lutz kick), 13:33. Saints 14–7. **Drive: 6 plays, 75 yards, 3:23.**
- NO – Alvin Kamara 4-yard run (Wil Lutz kick), 5:34. Saints 21–7. **Drive: 9 plays, 90 yards, 4:54.**
- NO – Alvin Kamara 1-yard run (Wil Lutz kick), 1:22. Saints 28–7. **Drive: 9 plays, 60 yards, 2:40.**
- NO – Michael Thomas 17-yard pass from Drew Brees (Wil Lutz kick), 0:02. Saints 35–7. **Drive: 1 plays, 17 yards, 0:06.**

Third quarter

- NO – Wil Lutz 29-yard field goal, 9:04. Saints 38–7. **Drive: 8 plays, 61 yards, 4:08.**
- NO – Drew Brees 1-yard run (Wil Lutz kick), 2:25. Saints 45–7. **Drive: 8 plays, 62 yards, 3:56.**

Fourth quarter

- NO – Wil Lutz 42-yard field goal, 10:41. Saints 48–7. **Drive: 9 plays, 35 yards, 5:52.**
- NO – Wil Lutz 41-yard field goal, 7:17. Saints 51–7. **Drive: 4 plays, 4 yards, 1:35.**
- CIN – Jeff Driskel 27-yard run (Randy Bullock kick), 4:42. Saints 51–14. **Drive: 6 plays, 75 yards, 2:35.**

**Top passers**

- NO – Drew Brees – 22/25, 265 yards, 3 TD
- CIN – Andy Dalton – 12/20, 153 yards, TD, 2 INT

**Top rushers**

- NO – Mark Ingram II – 13 carries, 104 yards
- CIN – Joe Mixon – 11 carries, 61 yards

**Top receivers**

- NO – Michael Thomas – 8 receptions, 70 yards, 2 TD
- CIN – Tyler Boyd – 3 receptions, 65 yards

After losing the newly acquired Dez Bryant for the year with an Achilles' tear in practice, several players, including Michael Thomas, and running backs Mark Ingram II and Alvin Kamara paid tribute by throwing up Bryant's signature 'X' celebration each time they scored. Safety Marcus Williams returned a long interception to end the first half with the Saints leading 35-7. New Orleans would eventually stun the Bengals in a 51-14 victory and their streak continued, going 8-1. It was also the first time since the 2010 season in which the Saints defeated the Bengals.

==== Week 11: vs. Philadelphia Eagles ====
Week Eleven: Philadelphia Eagles at New Orleans Saints – Game summary

Quarter	1	2	3	4	Total
Eagles	0	7	0	0	**7**
**Saints**	10	14	14	10	**48**

at Mercedes-Benz Superdome, New Orleans, Louisiana

- Date: November 18
- Game time: 3:25 pm. CST
- Game weather: Played indoors (dome stadium)
- Game attendance: 73,042
- Referee: Carl Cheffers
- TV announcers (Fox): Joe Buck, Troy Aikman and Erin Andrews
- Recap, Gamebook

Game information

**First quarter**

- NO – Wil Lutz 38-yard field goal, 9:10. Saints 3–0. **Drive: 8 plays, 57 yards, 4:14.**
- NO – Austin Carr 3-yard pass from Drew Brees (Wil Lutz kick), 3:12. Saints 10–0. **Drive: 11 plays, 86 yards, 4:52.**

**Second quarter**

- NO – Mark Ingram II 14-yard rush (Wil Lutz kick), 12:07. Saints 17–0. **Drive: 10 plays, 84 yards, 5:32.**
- PHI – Josh Adams 28-yard rush (Jake Elliott kick), 8:42. Saints 17–7. **Drive: 6 plays, 75 yards, 3:25.**
- NO – Tre'Quan Smith 15-yard pass from Drew Brees (Wil Lutz kick), 0:39. Saints 24–7. **Drive: 7 plays, 84 yards, 2:40.**

**Third quarter**

- NO – Michael Thomas 23-yard pass from Drew Brees (Wil Lutz kick), 11:20. Saints 31–7. **Drive: 6 plays, 70 yards, 3:40.**
- NO – Mark Ingram II 1-yard rush (Wil Lutz kick), 5:34. Saints 38–7. **Drive: 7 plays, 41 yards, 4:22.**

**Fourth quarter**

- NO – Alvin Kamara 37-yard pass from Drew Brees (Wil Lutz kick), 13:15. Saints 45–7. **Drive: 7 plays, 87 yards, 3:18.**
- NO – Wil Lutz 19-yard field goal, 6:46. Saints 48–7. **Drive: 8 plays, 33 yards, 5:02.**

**Top passers**

- PHI – Carson Wentz - 19/33, 156 yards, 3 INT
- NO – Drew Brees - 22/30, 363 yards, 4 TD

**Top rushers**

- PHI – Josh Adams - 7 rushes, 53 yards, 1 TD
- NO – Mark Ingram II - 16 rushes, 103 yards, 2 TD

**Top receivers**

- PHI – Golden Tate - 5 receptions, 48 yards
- NO – Tre'Quan Smith - 10 receptions, 157 yards, 1 TD

After head coach Sean Payton lost a golf bet to Eagles head coach Doug Pederson, the Saints, despite being the home team, wore their white color rush uniforms. It was the first time the Saints used the uniforms at home. They were able to beat the Eagles by 41 points, despite Philadelphia being the defending Super Bowl champions from last season. This brought the Saints record to 9-1.

==== Week 12: vs. Atlanta Falcons ====
NFL on Thanksgiving Day

Week Twelve: Atlanta Falcons at New Orleans Saints – Game summary

Quarter	1	2	3	4	Total
Falcons	3	0	7	7	**17**
**Saints**	7	10	7	7	**31**

at Mercedes-Benz Superdome, New Orleans, Louisiana

- Date: November 22
- Game time: 7:20 pm. CST
- Game weather: Played indoors (dome stadium)
- Game attendance: 73,017
- Referee: John Hussey
- TV announcers (NBC): Mike Tirico, Tony Dungy, Rodney Harrison, Michele Tafoya and Terry McAulay
- Recap, Gamebook

Game information

First quarter

- NO – Tommylee Lewis 28-yard pass from Drew Brees (Wil Lutz kick), 11:11. Saints 7–0. **Drive: 7 plays, 75 yards, 3:49.**
- ATL – Matt Bryant 32-yard field goal, 2:35. Saints 7–3. **Drive: 8 plays, 25 yards, 3:03.**

Second quarter

- NO – Wil Lutz 22-yard field goal, 9:09. Saints 10–3. **Drive: 15 plays, 81 yards, 8:26.**
- NO – Austin Carr 12-yard pass from Drew Brees (Wil Lutz kick), 3:20. Saints 17–3. **Drive: 7 plays, 42 yards, 4:10.**

Third quarter

- NO – Dan Arnold 25-yard pass from Drew Brees (Wil Lutz kick), 5:59. Saints 24–3. **Drive: 6 plays, 70 yards, 3:18.**
- ATL – Calvin Ridley 2-yard pass from Matt Ryan (Matt Bryant kick), 0:22. Saints 24–10. **Drive: 13 plays, 79 yards, 5:37.**

Fourth quarter

- NO – Keith Kirkwood 5-yard pass from Drew Brees (Wil Lutz kick), 9:27. Saints 31–10. **Drive: 5 plays, 22 yards, 3:00.**
- ATL – Tevin Coleman 4-yard pass from Matt Ryan (Matt Bryant kick), 1:51. Saints 31–17. **Drive: 7 plays, 59 yards, 1:48.**

**Top passers**

- ATL – Matt Ryan – 35/47, 377 yards, 2 TD, INT
- NO – Drew Brees – 15/22, 171 yards, 4 TD, INT

**Top rushers**

- ATL – Matt Ryan – 2 carries, 16 yards
- NO – Alvin Kamara – 14 carries, 89 yards

**Top receivers**

- ATL – Julio Jones – 11 receptions, 147 yards
- NO – Dan Arnold – 4 receptions, 48 yards, TD

The Saints were able to beat the Falcons 31-17 on a Thanksgiving Game. This not only improved their record to 10-1, it also marked the first season since 2015 to sweep the Falcons.

==== Week 13: at Dallas Cowboys ====
Week Thirteen: New Orleans Saints at Dallas Cowboys – Game summary

Quarter	1	2	3	4	Total
Saints	0	0	10	0	**10**
**Cowboys**	10	3	0	0	**13**

at AT&T Stadium, Arlington, Texas

- Date: November 29
- Game time: 7:20 pm. CST
- Game weather: 70 °F (21 °C), clear – retractable roof open
- Game attendance: 93,004
- Referee: Walt Anderson
- TV announcers (Fox/NFLN): Joe Buck, Troy Aikman, Erin Andrews and Kristina Pink
- Recap, Gamebook

Game information

First quarter

- DAL – Brett Maher 26-yard field goal, 9:27. Cowboys 3–0. **Drive: 12 plays, 67 yards, 5:36.**
- DAL – Ezekiel Elliott 16-yard pass from Dak Prescott (Brett Maher kick), 0:57. Cowboys 10–0. **Drive: 8 plays, 85 yards, 4:10.**

Second quarter

- DAL – Brett Maher 46-yard field goal, 0:55. Cowboys 13–0. **Drive: 16 plays, 70 yards, 9:09.**

Third quarter

- NO – Wil Lutz 33-yard field goal, 10:03. Cowboys 13–3. **Drive: 10 plays, 60 yards, 5:00.**
- NO – Keith Kirkwood 30-yard pass from Drew Brees (Wil Lutz kick), 1:08. Cowboys 13–10. **Drive: 10 plays, 88 yards, 4:39.**

Fourth quarter

- No scoring plays.

**Top passers**

- NO – Drew Brees – 18/28, 127 yards, TD, INT
- DAL – Dak Prescott – 24/28, 248 yards, TD

**Top rushers**

- NO – Alvin Kamara – 11 carries, 36 yards
- DAL – Ezekiel Elliott – 23 carries, 76 yards

**Top receivers**

- NO – Michael Thomas – 5 receptions, 40 yards
- DAL – Michael Gallup – 5 receptions, 76 yards

Michael Thomas recorded his 90th catch of the season, joining Odell Beckham Jr. as the only players in NFL history to record at least 90 receptions in their first three seasons. However, Drew Brees would lose the game for the Saints by throwing an interception to Jourdan Lewis, thus snapping the Saints' 10-game win streak and dropping them to 10–2.

==== Week 14: at Tampa Bay Buccaneers ====
Week Fourteen: New Orleans Saints at Tampa Bay Buccaneers – Game summary

Quarter	1	2	3	4	Total
**Saints**	0	3	8	17	**28**
Buccaneers	7	7	0	0	**14**

at Raymond James Stadium, Tampa, Florida

- Date: December 9
- Game time: 12:00 pm. CST/1:00 pm. EST
- Game weather: 71 °F (22 °C), cloudy
- Game attendance: 53,495
- Referee: Jerome Boger
- TV announcers (Fox): Kenny Albert, Ronde Barber and Sara Walsh
- Recap, Gamebook

Game information

First quarter

- TB – Cameron Brate 11-yard pass from Jameis Winston (Cairo Santos kick), 12:19. Buccaneers 7–0. **Drive: 7 plays, 75 yards, 2:41.**

Second quarter

- NO – Wil Lutz 30-yard field goal, 7:06. Buccaneers 7–3. **Drive: 9 plays, 52 yards, 4:11.**
- TB – Cameron Brate 1-yard pass from Jameis Winston (Cairo Santos kick), 0:26. Buccaneers 14–3. **Drive: 6 plays, 39 yards, 1:56.**

Third quarter

- NO – Zach Line 1-yard pass from Drew Brees (Alvin Kamara rush), 4:43. Buccaneers 14–11. **Drive: 5 plays, 30 yards, 2:35.**

Fourth quarter

- NO – Drew Brees 1-yard rush (Wil Lutz kick), 11:46. Saints 18–14. **Drive: 10 plays, 51 yards, 5:35.**
- NO – Mark Ingram II 17-yard rush (Wil Lutz kick), 7:26. Saints 25–14. **Drive: 7 plays, 53 yards, 3:08.**
- NO – Wil Lutz 36-yard field goal, 1:12. Saints 28–14. **Drive: 11 plays, 41 yards, 4:20.**

**Top passers**

- NO – Drew Brees – 24/31, 201 yards, 1 TD, 1 INT
- TB – Jameis Winston – 18/38, 213 yards, 2 TD, 1 INT

**Top rushers**

- NO – Mark Ingram II – 13 carries, 52 yards, 1 TD
- TB – Jameis Winston – 5 carries, 47 yards

**Top receivers**

- NO – Michael Thomas – 11 receptions, 98 yards
- TB – Mike Evans – 4 receptions, 86 yards

The New Orleans Saints trailed the Tampa Bay Buccaneers 14-3 halfway through the 3rd quarter when Taysom Hill sparked a rally by blocking a punt and setting up New Orleans inside Tampa Bay territory. The Saints would go on to win in a comeback 28-14 and clinching a playoff berth in the process. Their record improves to 11-2 with the victory over the Buccaneers. This would be the first of 5 straight victories over the Buccaneers.

==== Week 15: at Carolina Panthers ====
Week Fifteen: New Orleans Saints at Carolina Panthers – Game summary

Quarter	1	2	3	4	Total
**Saints**	3	3	0	6	**12**
Panthers	7	0	0	2	**9**

at Bank of America Stadium, Charlotte, North Carolina

- Date: December 17
- Game time: 7:15 pm. CST/8:15 pm. EST
- Game weather: 48 °F (9 °C), clear skies
- Game attendance: 74,188
- Referee: Tony Corrente
- TV announcers (ESPN): Joe Tessitore, Jason Witten, Booger McFarland and Lisa Salters
- Recap, Gamebook

Game information

**First quarter**

- CAR – Chris Manhertz 50-yard pass from Christian McCaffrey (Chandler Catanzaro kick), 4:02. Panthers 7–0. **Drive: 7 plays, 90 yards, 3:24.**
- NO – Wil Lutz 46-yard field goal, 2:20. Panthers 7–3. **Drive: 5 plays, 23 yards, 1:46.**

**Second quarter**

- NO – Wil Lutz 24-yard field goal, 10:00. Panthers 7–6. **Drive: 12 plays, 69 yards, 5:50.**

**Third quarter**

- No scoring plays.

**Fourth quarter**

- NO – Alvin Kamara 16-yard rush (pass failed), 12:12. Saints 12–7. **Drive: 11 plays, 84 yards, 6:13.**
- CAR – Donte Jackson New Orleans two-point conversion attempt interception return: 2 points Carolina. Saints 12–9.

**Top passers**

- NO – Drew Brees – 23/35, 203 yards, INT
- CAR – Cam Newton – 16/29, 131 yards, INT

**Top rushers**

- NO – Alvin Kamara – 14 carries, 67 yards, TD
- CAR – Christian McCaffrey – 15 carries, 53 yards

**Top receivers**

- NO – Michael Thomas – 7 receptions, 49 yards
- CAR – Christian McCaffrey – 8 receptions, 67 yards

The Saints travel to Bank of America Stadium to play against the Panthers. During the punt, Thomas Morstead was tripped up by the defender, prompting the Saints to get a free first down from the Roughing the Kicker penalty. The Saints win by 3 points and improve their record to 12-2.

==== Week 16: vs. Pittsburgh Steelers ====
Week Sixteen: Pittsburgh Steelers at New Orleans Saints – Game summary

Quarter	1	2	3	4	Total
Steelers	3	11	14	0	**28**
**Saints**	7	10	7	7	**31**

at Mercedes-Benz Superdome, New Orleans, Louisiana

- Date: December 23
- Game time: 3:25 pm. CST
- Game weather: Played indoors (dome stadium)
- Game attendance: 73,086
- Referee: Craig Wrolstad
- TV announcers (CBS): Jim Nantz, Tony Romo and Tracy Wolfson
- Recap, Gamebook

Game information

**First quarter**

- PIT – Chris Boswell 49-yard field goal, 5:32. Steelers 3–0. **Drive: 9 plays, 29 yards, 4:46.**
- NO – Mark Ingram II 1-yard rush (Wil Lutz kick), 2:57. Saints 7–3. **Drive: 6 plays, 75 yards, 2:35.**

**Second quarter**

- PIT – Chris Boswell 30-yard field goal, 14:05. Saints 7–6. **Drive: 9 plays, 78 yards, 3:52.**
- NO – Alvin Kamara 8-yard rush (Wil Lutz kick), 10:22. Saints 14–6. **Drive: 8 plays, 75 yards, 3:43.**
- PIT – Jaylen Samuels 3-yard pass from Ben Roethlisberger (Ben Roethlisberger-Eli Rogers pass), 0:40. Tied 14–14. **Drive: 15 plays, 97 yards, 6:04.**
- NO – Wil Lutz 43-yard field goal, 0:02. Saints 17–14. **Drive: 4 plays, 50 yards, 0:38.**

**Third quarter**

- NO – Alvin Kamara 1-yard rush (Wil Lutz kick), 9:13. Saints 24–14. **Drive: 11 plays, 75 yards, 5:47.**
- PIT – Antonio Brown 3-yard pass from Ben Roethlisberger (Chris Boswell kick), 4:48. Saints 24–21. **Drive: 9 plays, 75 yards, 4:25.**
- PIT – Antonio Brown 20-yard pass from Ben Roethlisberger (Chris Boswell kick), 1:02. Steelers 28–24. **Drive: 4 plays, 66 yards, 1:36.**

**Fourth quarter**

- NO – Michael Thomas 2-yard pass from Drew Brees (Wil Lutz kick), 1:25. Saints 31–28. **Drive: 10 plays, 46 yards, 2:41.**

**Top passers**

- PIT – Ben Roethlisberger – 33/50, 380 yards, 3 TD
- NO – Drew Brees – 27/39, 326 yards, 1 TD

**Top rushers**

- PIT – Jaylen Samuels – 12 carries, 53 yards
- NO – Mark Ingram II – 11 carries, 35 yards, 1 TD

**Top receivers**

- PIT – Antonio Brown – 14 receptions, 185 yards, 2 TD
- NO – Michael Thomas – 11 receptions, 109 yards, 1 TD

With the win, the Saints clinched home field advantage throughout the NFC playoffs. Mark Ingram II recorded his 50th touchdown, surpassing Deuce McAllister for the Saints franchise record for rushing touchdowns. The Saints were the only NFC South team to defeat all four of their AFC North opponents in 2018. They improve to 13-2 in the process.

==== Week 17: vs. Carolina Panthers ====
Week Seventeen: Carolina Panthers at New Orleans Saints – Game summary

Quarter	1	2	3	4	Total
**Panthers**	13	10	7	3	**33**
Saints	0	0	0	14	**14**

at Mercedes-Benz Superdome, New Orleans, Louisiana

- Date: December 30
- Game time: 12:00 pm. CST
- Game weather: Played indoors (dome stadium)
- Game attendance: 73,028
- Referee: Bill Vinovich
- TV announcers (Fox): Kenny Albert, Ronde Barber and Kristina Pink
- Recap, Gamebook

Game information

First quarter

- CAR – Kyle Allen 1-yard rush (Chandler Catanzaro kick), 10:04. Panthers 7–0. **Drive: 11 plays, 75 yards, 4:56.**
- CAR – Cameron Artis-Payne 15-yard rush (kick failed), 2:07. Panthers 13–0. **Drive: 9 plays, 89 yards, 4:51.**

Second quarter

- CAR – Ian Thomas 8-yard pass from Kyle Allen (Chandler Catanzaro kick), 2:00. Panthers 20–0. **Drive: 16 plays, 90 yards, 7:45.**
- CAR – Chandler Catanzaro 22-yard field goal, 0:00. Panthers 23–0. **Drive: 7 plays, 66 yards, 1:28.**

Third quarter

- CAR – Curtis Samuel 53-yard pass from Kyle Allen (Chandler Catanzaro kick), 3:46. Panthers 30–0. **Drive: 5 plays, 75 yards, 2:34.**

Fourth quarter

- NO – Tre'Quan Smith 9-yard pass from Teddy Bridgewater (Wil Lutz kick), 13:28. Panthers 30–7. **Drive: 9 plays, 75 yards, 5:18.**
- CAR – Chandler Catanzaro 51-yard field goal, 8:17. Panthers 33–7. **Drive: 9 plays, 42 yards, 5:11.**
- NO – Taysom Hill 9-yard rush (Wil Lutz kick), 3:47. Panthers 33–14. **Drive: 4 plays, 57 yards, 1:23.**

**Top passers**

- CAR – Kyle Allen – 16/27, 228 yards, 2 TD
- NO – Teddy Bridgewater – 14/22, 118 yards, 1 TD, 1 INT

**Top rushers**

- CAR – Cameron Artis-Payne – 16 carries, 56 yards
- NO – Dwayne Washington – 11 carries, 108 yards

**Top receivers**

- CAR – D. J. Moore – 4 receptions, 81 yards
- NO – Tre'Quan Smith – 3 receptions, 30 yards

Teddy Bridgewater started in this game. With the loss, the Saints finish the season 13-3. With the first-round bye, the Saints secured their spot in the playoffs.

=== Standings ===
==== Division ====
NFC South
	W	L	T	PCT	DIV	CONF	PF	PA	STK
^{(1)} New Orleans Saints	13	3	0	.813	4–2	9–3	504	353	L1
Atlanta Falcons	7	9	0	.438	4–2	7–5	414	423	W3
Carolina Panthers	7	9	0	.438	2–4	5–7	376	382	W1
Tampa Bay Buccaneers	5	11	0	.313	2–4	4–8	396	464	L4

==== Conference ====
NFC
#	Team	Division	W	L	T	PCT	DIV	CONF	SOS	SOV	STK
**Division leaders**
1 (Note: New Orleans finished ahead of LA Rams based on head-to-head victory, claiming the No. 1 seed.)	New Orleans Saints	South	13	3	0	.813	4–2	9–3	.482	.488	L1
2	Los Angeles Rams	West	13	3	0	.813	6–0	9–3	.480	.428	W2
3	Chicago Bears	North	12	4	0	.750	5–1	10–2	.430	.419	W4
4	Dallas Cowboys	East	10	6	0	.625	5–1	9–3	.488	.444	W2
**Wild Cards**
5	Seattle Seahawks	West	10	6	0	.625	3–3	8–4	.484	.400	W2
6	Philadelphia Eagles	East	9	7	0	.563	4–2	6–6	.518	.486	W3
**Did not qualify for the postseason**
7	Minnesota Vikings	North	8	7	1	.531	3–2–1	6–5–1	.504	.355	L1
8 (Note: Atlanta finished ahead of Washington based on head-to-head victory. Atlanta finished ahead of Carolina based on head-to-head sweep. Washington finished ahead of Carolina based on head-to-head victory.)	Atlanta Falcons	South	7	9	0	.438	4–2	7–5	.482	.348	W3
9	Washington Redskins	East	7	9	0	.438	2–4	6–6	.486	.371	L2
10	Carolina Panthers	South	7	9	0	.438	2–4	5–7	.508	.518	W1
11	Green Bay Packers	North	6	9	1	.406	1–4–1	3–8–1	.488	.417	L1
12	Detroit Lions	North	6	10	0	.375	2–4	4–8	.504	.427	W1
13 (Note: NY Giants finished ahead of Tampa Bay based on head-to-head victory.)	New York Giants	East	5	11	0	.313	1–5	4–8	.527	.487	L3
14	Tampa Bay Buccaneers	South	5	11	0	.313	2–4	4–8	.523	.506	L4
15	San Francisco 49ers	West	4	12	0	.250	1–5	2–10	.504	.406	L2
16	Arizona Cardinals	West	3	13	0	.188	2–4	3–9	.527	.302	L4
**Tiebreakers** (Note: When breaking ties for three or more teams under the NFL's rules, they are first broken within divisions, then comparing only the highest-ranked remaining team from each division.)

=== Single player milestone ===
Late in the first half of the Week 5, Monday Night game against the Washington Redskins, Quarterback Drew Brees surpassed Brett Favre (71,838) and Peyton Manning (71,940) for the most career passing yards. Brees surpassed Favre on a 2-yard touchdown pass to tight end Josh Hill, and later he surpassed Manning with a 62-yard touchdown pass to rookie wide receiver Tre'Quan Smith, giving him the NFL's All-Time Career pass yardage record. Brees also threw his 500th touchdown pass against the Baltimore Ravens, with a 1-yard touchdown pass to tight end Benjamin Watson.

== Postseason ==
Playoff round	Date	Opponent (seed)	Result	Record	Game site	NFL.com recap
Wild Card	First-round bye					
Divisional	January 13, 2019	Philadelphia Eagles (6)	W 20–14	1–0	Mercedes-Benz Superdome	Recap
NFC Championship	January 20, 2019	Los Angeles Rams (2)	L 23–26 (OT)	1–1	Mercedes-Benz Superdome	Recap

=== NFC Divisional Playoffs: vs. (6) Philadelphia Eagles ===
NFC Divisional Playoffs: (6) Philadelphia Eagles at (1) New Orleans Saints – Game summary

Quarter	1	2	3	4	Total
Eagles	14	0	0	0	14
Saints	0	10	7	3	20

at Mercedes-Benz Superdome, New Orleans, Louisiana

- Date: January 13, 2019
- Game time: 3:40 p.m. CST
- Game weather: Played indoors (dome stadium)
- Game attendance: 73,027
- Referee: Carl Cheffers
- TV announcers (Fox): Kevin Burkhardt, Charles Davis, Pam Oliver and Peter Schrager
- Recap, Gamebook

Game information

First quarter

- PHI – Jordan Matthews 37-yard pass from Nick Foles (Jake Elliott kick), 10:41. Eagles 7–0. Drive: 7 plays, 76 yards, 4:05.
- PHI – Nick Foles 1-yard rush (Jake Elliott kick), 4:37. Eagles 14–0. Drive: 10 plays, 75 yards, 5:14.

Second quarter

- NO – Keith Kirkwood 2-yard pass from Drew Brees (Wil Lutz kick), 7:23. Eagles 14–7. Drive: 12 plays, 79 yards, 6:12.
- NO – Wil Lutz 45-yard field goal, 0:06. Eagles 14–10. Drive: 7 plays, 67 yards, 1:12.

Third quarter

- NO – Michael Thomas 2-yard pass from Drew Brees (Wil Lutz kick), 1:40. Saints 17–14. Drive: 18 plays, 92 yards, 11:29.

Fourth quarter

- NO – Wil Lutz 39-yard field goal, 10:28. Saints 20–14. Drive: 8 plays, 62 yards, 3:31.

Top passers

- PHI – Nick Foles – 18/31, 201 yards, TD, 2 INT
- NO – Drew Brees – 28/38, 301 yards, 2 TD, INT

Top rushers

- PHI – Wendell Smallwood – 10 carries, 33 yards
- NO – Alvin Kamara – 16 carries, 71 yards

Top receivers

- PHI – Alshon Jeffery – 5 receptions, 63 yards
- NO – Michael Thomas – 12 receptions, 171 yards, TD

The Saints host the Philadelphia Eagles in the playoffs for the first time since the 2006 season, the first since the 2013 season to play the Eagles under Nick Foles. The Saints initially trailed by 14 points but made a comeback in the end. Marshon Lattimore stuns the Eagles with an interception to secure the Saints' victory and advance to the NFC Championship. Their record improves to 14-3.

=== NFC Championship: vs. (2) Los Angeles Rams ===
NFC Championship: (2) Los Angeles Rams at (1) New Orleans Saints – Game summary

Quarter	1	2	3	4	OT	Total
Rams	0	10	7	6	3	26
Saints	13	0	7	3	0	23

at Mercedes-Benz Superdome, New Orleans, Louisiana

- Date: January 20, 2019
- Game time: 2:05 pm. CST
- Game weather: Played indoors (dome stadium)
- Game attendance: 73,028
- Referee: Bill Vinovich
- TV announcers (Fox): Joe Buck, Troy Aikman, Erin Andrews and Chris Myers
- Recap, Gamebook

Game information

First quarter

- NO – Wil Lutz 37-yard field goal, 10:04. Saints 3–0. Drive: 11 plays, 56 yards, 4:56.
- NO – Wil Lutz 29-yard field goal, 7:06. Saints 6–0. Drive: 4 plays, 6 yards, 1:29.
- NO – Garrett Griffin 5-yard pass from Drew Brees (Wil Lutz kick), 1:35. Saints 13–0. Drive: 8 plays, 68 yards, 3:51.

Second quarter

- LAR – Greg Zuerlein 36-yard field goal, 9:45. Saints 13–3. Drive: 14 plays, 57 yards, 6:50.
- LAR – Todd Gurley 6-yard run (Greg Zuerlein kick), 0:23. Saints 13–10. Drive: 7 plays, 81 yards, 1:29.

Third quarter

- NO – Taysom Hill 2-yard pass from Drew Brees (Wil Lutz kick), 8:34. Saints 20–10. Drive: 12 plays, 71 yards, 5:31.
- LAR – Tyler Higbee 1-yard pass from Jared Goff (Greg Zuerlein kick), 3:06. Saints 20–17. Drive: 10 plays, 75 yards, 5:28.

Fourth quarter

- LAR – Greg Zuerlein 24-yard field goal, 5:03. Tied 20–20. Drive: 9 plays, 85 yards, 5:52.
- NO – Wil Lutz 31-yard field goal, 1:41. Saints 23–20. Drive: 9 plays, 57 yards, 3:22.
- LAR – Greg Zuerlein 48-yard field goal, 0:15. Tied 23–23. Drive: 9 plays, 45 yards, 1:26.

Overtime

- LAR - Greg Zuerlein 57-yard field goal, 11:47. Rams 26–23. Drive: 5 plays, 15 yards, 2:12.

Top passers

- LAR – Jared Goff – 25/40, 297 yards, TD, INT
- NO – Drew Brees – 26/40, 249 yards, 2 TD, INT

Top rushers

- LAR – C. J. Anderson – 16 rushes, 44 yards
- NO – Mark Ingram II – 9 rushes, 31 yards

Top receivers

- LAR – Brandin Cooks – 7 receptions, 107 yards
- NO – Alvin Kamara – 11 receptions, 96 yards

Coming off with the Divisional Round victory over the Eagles, the Saints remain in the Superdome to host the Los Angeles Rams. It was the first time since January 24, 2010, the Saints host the NFC Championship in their home field.

The game was marred with controversy after the referees missed a pass interference call of Nickell Robey-Coleman's hit on Tommylee Lewis on 3rd-and-10 with 1:45 remaining in the 4th quarter. The NFL admitted to missing the call soon after the game was over, but did not apologize for the situation until a week and a half later. The fallout from the missed call was a factor in the NFL's decision to expand instant replay, making pass interference (including non-calls) reviewable.

With the controversial loss in overtime, the Saints finish their season 14-4.
