= Frostproof, Florida =

- City
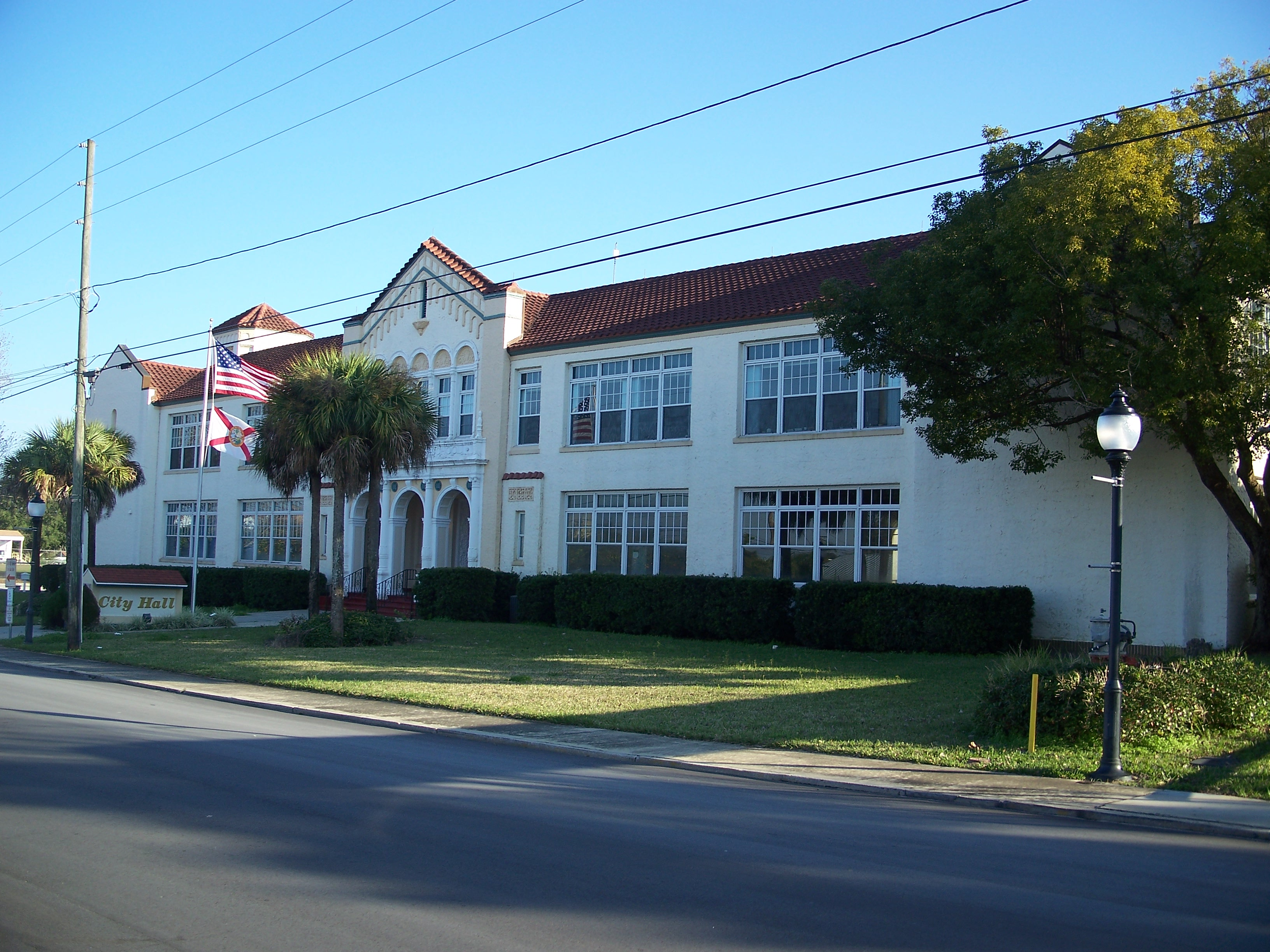
- Frostproof Middle-Senior High School

- Seal
- Motto: "The Friendly City"
- Location in Polk County and the state of Florida
- Coordinates: 27°44′57″N 81°31′31″W
- Country: United States of America
- State: Florida
- County: Polk
- Settled (Fort Clinch): January 1850–June 1850
- Settled (Keystone City): c. 1880s
- Settled (Frostproof): 1892
- Community (Lakemont): 1898–1906
- Community (Frostproof): 1906
- Incorporated (Town of Frostproof): June 18, 1918
- Incorporated (City of Frostproof): November 11, 1960

Government
  - Type: Council-Manager
  - Mayor: Michael "Mike" Hutto
  - Vice Mayor: Leslie Brewer
  - Council Members: Adam W. Greenway, Austin Gravley, and Tashana True
  - City Manager and City Clerk: Nicole McDowell
  - City Attorney: Anthony Sabatini

Area
  - Total: 19.34 sq mi (50.08 km^{2})
  - Land: 10.79 sq mi (27.94 km^{2})
  - Water: 8.55 sq mi (22.14 km^{2})
- Elevation: 82 ft (25 m)

Population (2020)
  - Total: 2,877
  - Density: 266.7/sq mi (102.97/km^{2})
- Time zone: UTC-5 (Eastern (EST))
  - Summer (DST): UTC-4 (EDT)
- ZIP code: 33843
- Area code: 863
- FIPS code: 12-24900
- GNIS feature ID: 2403667
- Website: cityoffrostproof.com

Frostproof is a city in Polk County, Florida, United States. The city is located in southern Polk County on the Lake Wales Ridge. It is part of the Lakeland–Winter Haven Metropolitan Statistical Area. The population was 2,877 at the 2020 census.

== History ==
The settlement in the area now known as Frostproof was established in 1850. This settlement, like many in Central Florida at the time, was set up as a fort and was called Fort Clinch. The fort was named after the local Lake Clinch which was, in turn, named after the Seminole War commander Duncan Lamont Clinch.

The Fort Clinch settlement started in January 1850, but was abandoned by June 1850. But by the 1880s, Frostproof began to see its first permanent settlers as homesteaders were attracted to the abundant hunting in the area which included much deer and turkey, as well as fishing.

The name was a marketing ploy to convince potential landowners that the community has never had, and never would have, a frost that could destroy the large citrus-driven economy. But ironically, a frost during the Great Freeze winter of 1894 and 1895 killed most of the citrus in Frostproof. Prior to being named Frostproof, it was briefly named Keystone City. However, after being confused regularly with Keystone Heights, a city in North Florida, Frostproof was coined.

This happened when W. H. Overocker applied for its first post office in 1892, with the name "Keystone City". But postal authorities disallowed it because there was already a Keystone Heights in Florida. Joseph Washington (J.W.) Carson, whose family were one of the first settlers in the community in 1886, suggested "Frostproof" as a substitute, but Overocker and many residents chose "Lakemont" instead.

J.W. Carson volunteered to deliver the application to the post office in Fort Meade, and on his way there, he scratched out the name "Lakemont" and wrote "Frostproof", which was approved. When Carson and many residents found out Overocker changed the community's name, they briefly got it switched back to the Lakemont name, from 1898 to 1906. But in 1906, Overocker, to his surprise, was appointed the postmaster, and he renamed it Frostproof again. The early post office was located on the corner of Wall Street and Carson Avenue.

After many delays, Frostproof first received rail service in 1912. Frostproof's Historic Train Depot no longer has passenger trains or freight arriving or departing; however, it is open for tours.

The Town of Frostproof was incorporated as a municipality on June 18, 1918, and was approved by the Florida Legislature the following year. It officially became the City of Frostproof on November 11, 1960. Its historic downtown district runs east and west between Lake Clinch and Lake Reedy on Wall Street.

== Geography ==
Frostproof is located between two lakes: Lake Clinch and Lake Reedy. According to the United States Census Bureau, the city has a total area of 2.5 square miles (6.5 km^{2}), all land. Frostproof is located within the Central Florida Highlands area of the Atlantic coastal plain with a terrain consisting of flatland interspersed with gently rolling hills.

== Climate ==
Frostproof is located in the humid subtropical climate zone, as designated by (Köppen climate classification: Cfa). In spite of the city's name, Frostproof experiences at least one night of sub-freezing temperatures during 65% of its winters.

== Demographics ==
Historical population
Census	Pop.	Note	%±
1930	1,406		—
1940	1,704		21.2%
1950	2,329		36.7%
1960	2,664		14.4%
1970	2,814		5.6%
1980	2,995		6.4%
1990	2,808		−6.2%
2000	2,975		5.9%
2010	2,992		0.6%
2020	2,877		−3.8%
U.S. Decennial Census

=== Racial and ethnic composition ===
Frostproof racial composition (Hispanics excluded from racial categories) (NH = Non-Hispanic)
Race	Pop 2010	Pop 2020	% 2010	% 2020
White (NH)	2,220	1,942	74.20%	67.50%
Black or African American (NH)	121	149	4.04%	5.18%
Native American or Alaska Native (NH)	13	18	0.43%	0.63%
Asian (NH)	7	13	0.23%	0.45%
Pacific Islander or Native Hawaiian (NH)	0	1	0.00%	0.03%
Some other race (NH)	0	6	0.00%	0.21%
Two or more races/Multiracial (NH)	27	106	0.90%	3.68%
Hispanic or Latino (any race)	604	642	20.19%	22.31%
Total	2,992	2,877		

=== 2020 census ===
As of the 2020 census, Frostproof had a population of 2,877. The median age was 45.4 years. 20.6% of residents were under the age of 18 and 24.9% of residents were 65 years of age or older. For every 100 females there were 96.4 males, and for every 100 females age 18 and over there were 93.3 males age 18 and over.

92.0% of residents lived in urban areas, while 8.0% lived in rural areas.

There were 1,229 households in Frostproof, of which 28.6% had children under the age of 18 living in them. Of all households, 42.4% were married-couple households, 20.7% were households with a male householder and no spouse or partner present, and 29.9% were households with a female householder and no spouse or partner present. About 29.0% of all households were made up of individuals and 15.0% had someone living alone who was 65 years of age or older.

There were 1,625 housing units, of which 24.4% were vacant. The homeowner vacancy rate was 2.6% and the rental vacancy rate was 16.9%.

According to the 2020 American Community Survey 5-year estimates, there were 833 families residing in the city.

=== 2010 census ===
As of the 2010 United States census, there were 2,992 people, 1,181 households, and 892 families residing in the city.

=== 2000 census ===
As of the census of 2000, there were 2,975 people, 1,119 households, and 792 families residing in the city. The population density was 1,196.8 inhabitants per square mile (462.1/km^{2}). There were 1,504 housing units at an average density of 605.0 per square mile (233.6/km^{2}). The racial makeup of the city was 78.22% White, 3.90% African American, 0.84% Native American, 0.07% Asian, 0.07% Pacific Islander, 14.35% from other races, and 2.55% from two or more races. Hispanic or Latino residents of any race were 21.65% of the population.

In 2000, there were 1,119 households, out of which 29.7% had children under the age of 18 living with them, 52.0% were married couples living together, 13.8% had a female householder with no husband present, and 29.2% were non-families. 24.4% of all households were made up of individuals, and 14.8% had someone living alone who was 65 years of age or older. The average household size was 2.66 and the average family size was 3.11.

In 2000, in the city, 26.7% of the population was under the age of 18, 11.2% was from 18 to 24, 23.6% from 25 to 44, 20.5% from 45 to 64, and 18.1% was 65 years of age or older. The median age was 35 years. For every 100 females, there were 101.7 males. For every 100 females age 18 and over, there were 98.5 males.

In 2000, the median income for a household in the city was $30,412, and the median income for a family was $33,707. Males had a median income of $27,234 versus $18,273 for females. The per capita income for the city was $15,396. About 14.7% of families and 16.8% of the population were below the poverty line, including 21.1% of those under age 18 and 9.0% of those age 65 or over.

== Notable people ==
- Adam W. Greenway, former president of Southwestern Baptist Theological Seminary in Fort Worth, Texas
- Ben Hill Griffin Jr., founder of the citrus empire, politician, and member of the Forbes 400 in 1989
- Alvin Harper, former NFL American football wide receiver
- Travis Henry, former NFL American football running back
- Nickell Robey, NFL American football cornerback for the Los Angeles Rams

== Business ==
Frostproof is home to the Latt Maxcy Corporation and Ben Hill Griffin, Inc., both members of the agricultural cooperative Florida's Natural. Frostproof is also home to the Historic Ramon Theater built in 1925. The theater is still in operation and hosts live music and entertainment as well as murder mystery events. The Historic Atlantic Coast Line Train Depot, built in 1912, has been renovated and is "Polk County's Newest Old Attraction." Art and Culture plays a significant role in Frostproof.

== Media ==
- The city has a weekly newspaper, the Frostproof News.
- The Ledger, based in Lakeland, is the most popular daily newspaper.
- While there are no television stations located in Frostproof, broadcast signals from Tampa Bay and Orlando area television stations are available.
- Most cable and satellite providers offer Tampa Bay and Orlando area stations. Starlink is available in the rural areas of Frostproof.
- Attractions and places of local interest may be found by visiting the “Visit Frostproof” website created by a local tourism ambassador.

== Transportation ==
- SR 17 – The Scenic Highway, leading north to Lake Wales
- US 27 – A four-lane divided highway running north–south just west of town, also leading northward to Lake Wales, and southward to Sebring.
- US 98 – Running west from US 27, this road leads to Ft. Meade and eventually to Bartow and Lakeland. Southbound, it is co-signed with US 27.

Frostproof serves as the terminus of a branch of the short-line Florida Midland Railroad, which operates on the former Atlantic Coast Line Railroad's Haines City Branch. The CSX Auburndale Subdivision, which was originally the Seaboard Air Line Railroad subsidiary Florida Western and Northern Railroad had a station in nearby West Frostproof.

== Education ==
The public schools in Frostproof are operated by the Polk County School Board. There are two schools in Frostproof: Frostproof Middle-Senior High School, and Frostproof Ben Hill Griffin Elementary School. The high school in Frostproof has won the state football championship four times—in 1974, 1992, 1999, and 2025 —and the state softball championship once, in 2006.
