= Frostproof Middle-Senior High School =

Location
- 1000 N Palm Ave; Frostproof, Florida 33843; United States; 27.7609°N 81.5333°W

Information
- Type: Public school
- School district: Polk County Public Schools
- Principal: Alexander McLuckey
- Teaching staff: 58.00 (FTE)
- Grades: 6–12
- Enrollment: 1,082 (2023–2024)
- Student to teacher ratio: 18.66
- Campus: Rural
- Colors: Red Blue white
- Athletics: Florida High School Athletic Association
- Mascot: Bulldog
- Website: https://frostproofms.polkschoolsfl.com/

Frostproof Middle-High School or FMSHS is a combined middle school/high school located in Frostproof, Florida, serving the city of Frostproof and nearby areas.

== Notable alumni ==
- Alvin Harper, former NFL player
- Travis Henry, former NFL player
- Nickell Robey-Coleman, former NFL player

== See also ==
- Polk County, Florida
