= Alvin Harper =

American football player (born 1967)

No. 80, 82, 1
- Position: Wide receiver

Personal information
- Born: July 6, 1967 (age 59); Lake Wales, Florida, U.S.
- Listed height: 6 ft 3 in (1.91 m)
- Listed weight: 210 lb (95 kg)

Career information
- High school: Frostproof (Frostproof, Florida)
- College: Tennessee
- NFL draft: 1991: 1st round, 12th overall pick

Career history
- Dallas Cowboys (1991–1994); Tampa Bay Buccaneers (1995–1996); Washington Redskins (1997); New Orleans Saints (1997); Dallas Cowboys (1999); Memphis Maniax (2001)

Awards and highlights
- 2× Super Bowl champion (XXVII, XXVIII); Second-team All-SEC (1990)

Career NFL statistics
- Receptions: 191
- Receiving yards: 3,473
- Receiving touchdowns: 21
- Stats at Pro Football Reference

Alvin Craig Harper (born July 6, 1967) is an American former professional football player who was a wide receiver in the National Football League (NFL) for the Dallas Cowboys, Tampa Bay Buccaneers, Washington Redskins and New Orleans Saints. He played college football for the Tennessee Volunteers. Harper was selected by the Dallas Cowboys in the first round of the 1991 NFL draft. He played in Dallas for four years as the Cowboys won Super Bowl XXVII and Super Bowl XXVIII, both against the Buffalo Bills.

== Early life ==
Harper attended Frostproof High School, where he was an outstanding football player, earning USA Today high school All-American honors as a senior in 1986.

He also excelled in track and field; at one time he held the Florida High School high jump record, and also won two state Class A high jumping titles. As a basketball player he averaged 23 points and 10 rebounds per game.

== College career ==
Harper accepted a football scholarship from the University of Tennessee. As a freshman, he appeared in 12 games as a backup wide receiver, making 15 receptions for 247 yards and one touchdown. He had a 45-yard touchdown reception in the second game against Colorado State University.

As a sophomore, he was named a starter at wide receiver. He appeared in 11 games, posting 37 receptions for 487 yards and 5 touchdowns. In his first start in the fifth game against Washington State University, he set a school single-game record with 12 receptions.

As a junior, he appeared in 11 games, tallying 13 receptions for 246 yards and 2 touchdowns.

As a senior, he earned All-Southeastern Conference Freshman First-team honors in 1987, and All-Southeastern Conference first-team honors in 1990. He was also the MVP of the 1991 Hula Bowl, and finished his NCAA football career with 103 receptions for 1,547 yards and 16 touchdowns.

He continued to excel in track and field, capturing the 1989 Southeastern Conference indoor high jump championship with a jump of 7 ft 2½in. He also anchored the University of Tennessee 4x100 and 4x400 meter relays.

== Professional career ==
=== Dallas Cowboys ===
In the 1991 NFL draft, the Dallas Cowboys sought a receiving partner for starter Michael Irvin and selected Harper in the first round (12th overall). As a rookie, he caught 20 passes for 326 yards and one touchdown, helping Dallas finish 11–5, its first winning season since 1985. He missed the seventh game against the Cincinnati Bengals with a neck injury.

In 1992, he rushed once for 15 yards and caught 35 passes for 562 yards and four touchdowns. He also recorded an interception at Denver Broncos when he, as an extra defender, picked off a Hail Mary by Tommy Maddox at the end of the first half. He probably had the signature play of his career during the NFC Championship against the San Francisco 49ers, catching a slant route for 70 yards, setting up the Cowboys on the 10-yard line and sealing the win. He also caught a 45-yard touchdown from quarterback Troy Aikman during the 52–17 victory over the Buffalo Bills in Super Bowl XXVII, after which he dunked the ball over the goal post crossbar.

=== Tampa Bay Buccaneers ===
On March 8, 1995, Harper signed a lucrative free agent contract with the Tampa Bay Buccaneers based on his big play ability and championship experience. Though he had a career-high 46 receptions for 633 yards and 2 touchdowns in his first season in Tampa, he was not able to live up to his free agent billing. He missed the first 3 games of the season because of a left sprained medial collateral ligament and a sprained left ankle he suffered in the first preseason game against the New York Jets. He clinched a 14–6 win in the fourth game against the Washington Redskins with a touchdown reception in the final 6 minutes. His best game came against the Cincinnati Bengals with 6 receptions for 117 yards and no touchdowns.

In 1996, he appeared in 12 games with 7 starts, registering 19 receptions for 289 yards and one touchdown. His top receiving game came in the third game against the Denver Broncos, making 2 receptions for 77 yards and one touchdown. He had 4 receptions for 41 yards and no touchdowns in the fifth game against the Detroit Lions. Harper was replaced with Robb Thomas in the second half of the sixth game against the Minnesota Vikings and would lose his job as the starter at wide receiver. He would start once more in the season finale against the Chicago Bears, in place of an injured Thomas.

On June 10, 1997, he was released before the start of the season. During his two years in Tampa he was slowed by injuries and played in only 25 games, where he caught 65 passes for 922 yards and three touchdowns.

=== Washington Redskins ===
On June 11, 1997, the Washington Redskins signed him, gambling that he could flourish again after being reunited with head coach Norv Turner, who had been his offensive coordinator in Dallas. Harper was a reserve player in 12 games, in which he caught only 2 receptions for 65 yards in the fourth game against the Jacksonville Jaguars. On December 1, he was released after he complained about his playing time, following the Redskins 23–20 loss to the St. Louis Rams.

=== New Orleans Saints ===
On December 2, 1997, he was claimed off waiver by the New Orleans Saints. He was declared inactive in the last 3 games of the season. He was released on July 24, 1998.

=== Dallas Cowboys ===
On October 14, 1999, he was signed by the Dallas Cowboys, to provide depth after Michael Irvin suffered a career-ending neck injury in the fourth game against the Philadelphia Eagles. His jersey number 80 was used by Ernie Mills, so he chose to wear number 82. He appeared in 2 games as a reserve player and did not register any statistics. He was released on December 7.

Harper finished his eight NFL seasons with 191 receptions for 3,473 yards and 21 touchdowns. He also rushed once for 15 yards, completed a pass for 46 yards, and recorded one interception on defense.

=== Memphis Maniax (XFL) ===
In 2001, he was signed by the Memphis Maniax of the XFL, reuniting with head coach Kippy Brown, who was his wide receivers coach with the University of Tennessee. Harper was a backup wide receiver and only posted one reception for 8 yards.

=== NFL statistics ===
Year	Team	Games		Receiving					Fumbles	
Year	Team	GP	GS	Rec	Yds	Avg	Lng	TDs	Fum	Lost
1991	DAL	15	5	20	326	16.3	39	1	0	0
1992	DAL	16	13	35	562	16.1	52	4	1	1
1993	DAL	16	15	36	777	21.6	80	5	1	1
1994	DAL	16	14	33	821	24.9	90	8	2	2
1995	TB	13	12	46	633	13.8	49	2	0	0
1996	TB	12	7	19	289	15.2	40	1	1	1
1997	WSH	12	0	2	65	32.5	52	0	0	0
1999	DAL	2	0	0	0	0	0	0	0	0
Career		100	66	191	3,473	18.2	90	21	5	5

== Personal life ==
In 2004, he was a volunteer wide receivers coach at Howard University. In 2005, he served an NFL coaching internship as the Rhein Fire wide receivers assistant coach in NFL Europe.

Harper now resides in Winter Haven, Florida.
