= Lake Clinch =

Freshwater lake near Frostproof, Florida

Coordinates: 27.74310°N 81.54885°W

- Location within Florida
- Location: Polk County, Florida
- Type: Natural freshwater lake
- Basin countries: United States
- Max. length: 2.03 mi (3.27 km)
- Max. width: 1.46 mi (2.35 km)
- Surface area: 1,219 acres (493 ha)
- Average depth: 16.0 ft (4.9 m)
- Max. depth: 55.0 ft (16.8 m)
- Water volume: 691,750,076 US gal (2.61855889×10^{9} L; 576,002,431 imp gal)
- Surface elevation: 102 ft (31 m)
- Settlements: Frostproof, Florida

Lake Clinch is a natural freshwater lake on the west side of Frostproof, Florida. Residences surround much of the lake, which has a public beach area and a public boat ramp on the southwest side of Frostproof. The city of Frostproof has a public park on its eastern shore.
