= Nickell Robey-Coleman =

American football player (born 1992)

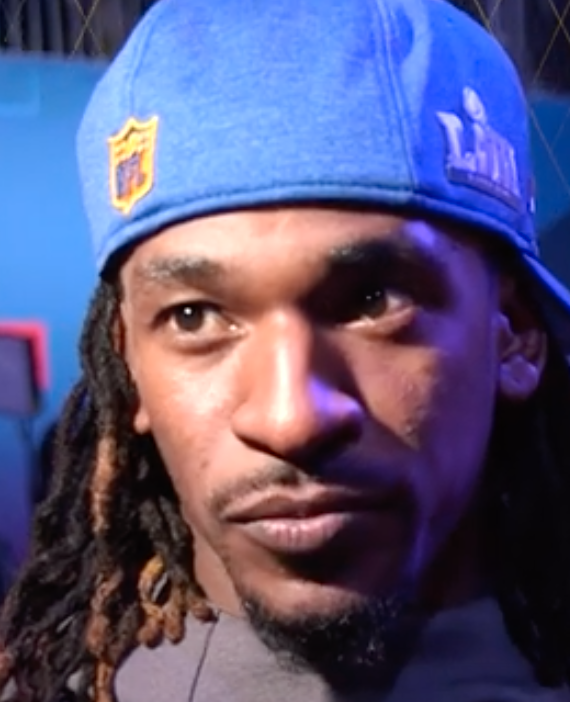
- Robey-Coleman in 2019

No. 37, 21, 23, 31, 1
- Position: Cornerback

Personal information
- Born: January 17, 1992 (age 34); Frostproof, Florida, U.S.
- Listed height: 5 ft 8 in (1.73 m)
- Listed weight: 180 lb (82 kg)

Career information
- High school: Frostproof
- College: USC (2010–2012)
- NFL draft: 2013: undrafted

Career history
- Buffalo Bills (2013–2016); Los Angeles Rams (2017–2019); Philadelphia Eagles (2020); Detroit Lions (2021); Las Vegas Raiders (2022)

Awards and highlights
- First-team All-Pac-12 (2011); Second-team All-Pac-12 (2012)

Career NFL statistics
- Total tackles: 338
- Sacks: 5.0
- Forced fumbles: 6
- Fumble recoveries: 6
- Pass deflections: 49
- Interceptions: 6
- Defensive touchdowns: 3
- Stats at Pro Football Reference

Nickell Robey-Coleman (born January 17, 1992) is an American former professional football player who was a cornerback in the National Football League (NFL). He was signed by the Buffalo Bills as an undrafted free agent in 2013 after playing college football for the USC Trojans. Robey-Coleman has also played for the Los Angeles Rams, Philadelphia Eagles, Detroit Lions and Las Vegas Raiders.

== Early life ==
A native of Frostproof, Florida, Robey-Coleman attended Frostproof Middle-Senior High School, where he played quarterback, wide receiver, defensive back, and return specialist for the Bulldogs football team. During his senior year, in 2009, he had 764 yards on 88 carries (8.9 avg.) with nine touchdowns and caught 17 passes for 232 yards (13.7 avg.) with six touchdowns on offense. He had 73 tackles, two interceptions, and two forced fumbles on defense and averaged 17.1 yards on eight punt returns and 34.7 yards on seven kickoff returns. Robey-Coleman was ranked as a four-star recruit and the ninth best cornerback coming out of high school by the Rivals.com recruiting service. He chose USC over West Virginia, Tennessee, and Clemson, among other schools.

In addition to playing high school football, he was on Frostproof's baseball and track teams.

== College career ==
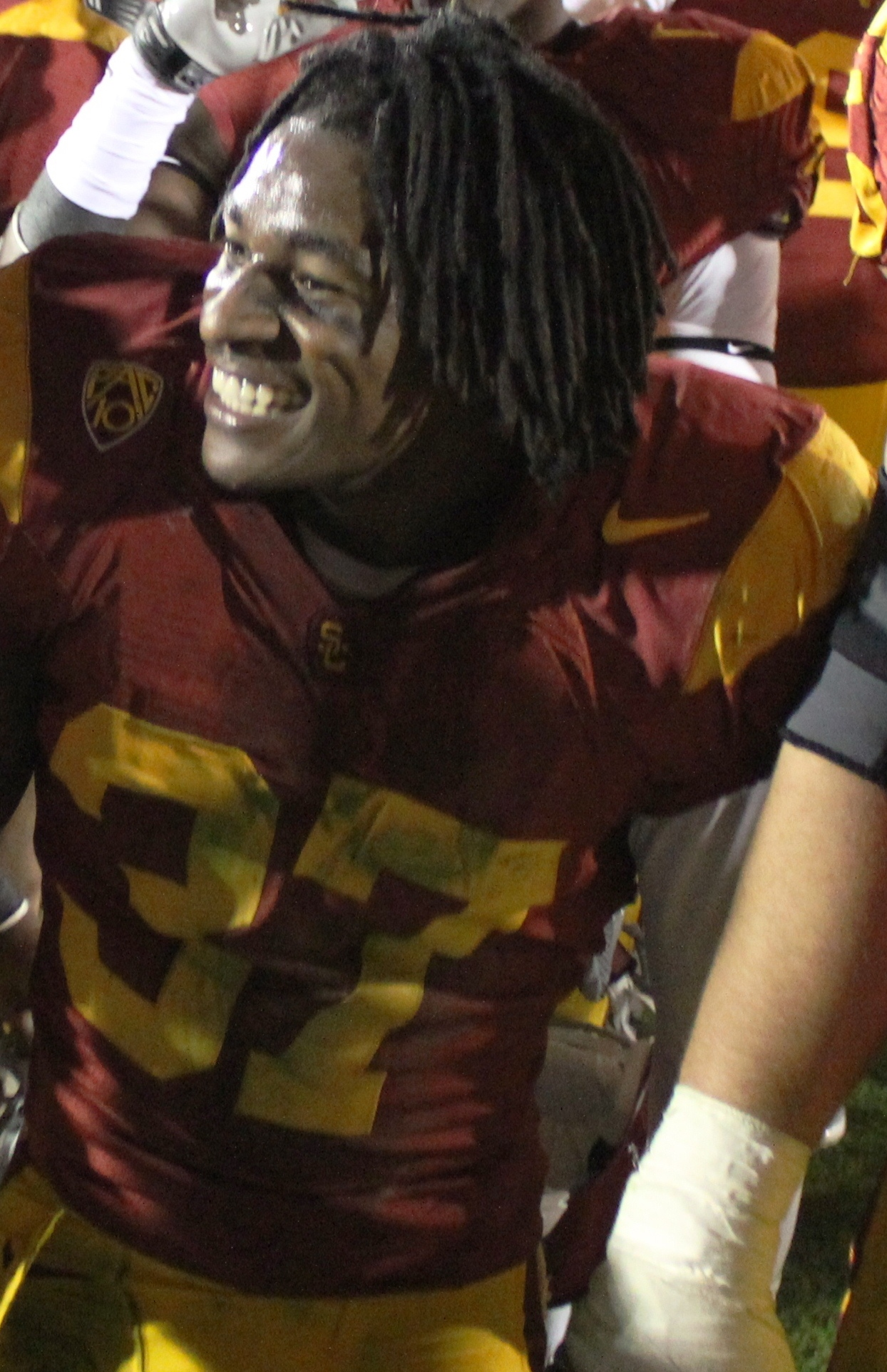
Robey-Coleman while at USC in 2010

After graduating high school, Robey-Coleman attended and played college football for the USC Trojans.

As a freshman, Robey-Coleman started all of the 2010 season when he became a cornerback after playing wide receiver in high school. He was named to the 2010 Collegefootballnews.com Freshman All-American honorable mention list, All-Pac-10 honorable mention, and Phil Steele's All-Pac-10 fourth team in recognition of his freshman season.

Robey-Coleman put together a solid sophomore season in 2011. He started in all 12 games, posting a record of 63 tackles (including 5.5 for losses and 2 sacks), a team-high nine deflections, and two interceptions (with one a touchdown). He made 12 punt returns for 132 yards total. He was a first-team All-Pac-12 selection and was named to the 2011 CollegeFootballNews.com Sophomore All-American second-team.

In his final season with the Trojans in 2012, Robey-Coleman would once again put together a solid season. He was a Jim Thorpe Award candidate and returned punts and kicks for the Trojans. He was a second-team All-Pac-12 selection.

Robey-Coleman decided to forgo his senior season and entered the 2013 NFL draft.

== Professional career ==
Pre-draft measurables
Height	Weight	Arm length	Hand span	40-yard dash	10-yard split	20-yard split	20-yard shuttle	Three-cone drill	Vertical jump	Broad jump	Bench press
5 ft 7 1/4 in (1.71 m)	169 lb (77 kg)	29 3/4 in (0.76 m)	9 1/8 in (0.23 m)	4.53 s	1.57 s	2.48 s	4.09 s	6.74 s	37 1/2 in (0.95 m)	10 ft 7 in (3.23 m)	10 reps
All values from 2013 NFL Combine

=== Buffalo Bills ===
Robey-Coleman was signed by the Buffalo Bills as an undrafted free agent following the conclusion of the 2013 NFL draft. In a Week 7 matchup against the Miami Dolphins, Robey-Coleman recorded his first interception, returning it 19 yards for a touchdown. In the 2013 season, he recorded 39 tackles, three sacks, six stuffs, one forced fumble, and one interception.

In his second season in the NFL, Robey-Coleman recorded 46 tackles, one sack, one stuff, and one pass defensed.

On August 9, 2015, Robey-Coleman signed a two-year contract extension with the Bills. In the 2015 season, he recorded 46 tackles, one sack, and four passes defensed.

In Week 2 of the 2016 season, Robey-Coleman had a 36-yard fumble return for a touchdown against the New York Jets. In Week 5, against the Los Angeles Rams, he had a 41-yard pick six. In the 2016 season, Robey-Coleman recorded 35 tackles, two run stuffs, two interceptions, and seven passes defensed.

On March 6, 2017, Robey-Coleman was released by the Bills.

=== Los Angeles Rams ===
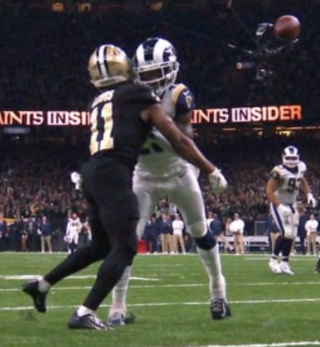
The moment Nickell Robey Coleman committed an uncalled defensive pass interference penalty on Tommylee Lewis

On April 7, 2017, Robey-Coleman was signed by the Los Angeles Rams. In Week 3, he recorded an interception against the San Francisco 49ers that led to running back Todd Gurley to score his first touchdown of the game in the Rams 41–39 win. In Week 6 against the Jacksonville Jaguars, he recorded his second interception off a tipped ball by tight end Marcedes Lewis in a 27–17 win. He played in 15 games with four starts as the Rams' primary slot corner and nickelback, recording a career-high 49 tackles, nine passes defensed, two interceptions, and one forced fumble.

On March 13, 2018, Robey-Coleman signed a three-year contract extension with the Rams. In the 2018 regular season, he had 37 total tackles, four passes defended, and one interception in 16 appearances with one start. In the NFC Championship on January 20, 2019, against the New Orleans Saints, Robey-Coleman was involved in a controversial moment late in the game when he collided with Saints receiver Tommylee Lewis helmet-to-helmet. The hit would have been pass interference or a personal foul, but neither came about. The Rams went on to win 26–23 in overtime, sending them to Super Bowl LIII. Following the game, Robey-Coleman admitted that he thought he should have been called for defensive pass interference or a personal foul. On January 25, 2019, Robey-Coleman was fined $26,739 for the hit on Lewis. During the Super Bowl, Robey-Coleman made a helmet-to-helmet hit on Rex Burkhead, which resulted in a personal foul. The entire game turned out to be a defensive struggle as the Rams eventually were defeated, 13–3. He had two tackles and one pass defended in the game. On February 10, 2019, Robey-Coleman was again fined $26,739.

In the 2019 season, Robey-Coleman finished with 36 total tackles, seven passes defended, and two forced fumbles in 16 games, of which he started three.

On March 17, 2020, the Rams declined the option on Robey-Coleman's contract, making him an unrestricted free agent.

=== Philadelphia Eagles ===
On March 31, 2020, Robey-Coleman signed a one-year contract with the Philadelphia Eagles. He was placed on the reserve/COVID-19 list by the team on January 3, 2021, and activated on January 20. He finished the 2020 season with 44 total tackles, one pass defended, one forced fumble, and one fumble recovery in 15 games, of which he started seven.

=== Detroit Lions ===
On August 9, 2021, Robey-Coleman signed with the Detroit Lions. He was released on August 31, 2021, and re-signed to the practice squad the next day. He appeared in one game, Week 14 against the Denver Broncos, for the Lions in the 2021 season.

=== Las Vegas Raiders ===
On September 13, 2022, Robey-Coleman signed with the Las Vegas Raiders' practice squad. He appeared in two games for the Raiders in the 2022 season.

=== NFL career statistics ===
Regular season
Year	Team	Games		Tackles				Fumbles				Interceptions					
Year	Team	GP	GS	Comb	Total	Ast	Sck	FF	FR	Yds	TD	PD	INT	Yds	Avg	Lng	TD
2013	BUF	16	2	39	30	9	3.0	1	1	0	0	10	1	19	19.0	19T	1
2014	BUF	16	7	48	38	10	1.0	—	2	2	0	7	—	—	0.0	—	—
2015	BUF	16	3	46	39	7	1.0	—	—	—	—	4	—	—	0.0	—	—
2016	BUF	16	3	35	32	3	0.0	1	1	36	1	7	2	44	22.0	41T	1
2017	LAR	15	4	49	39	10	0.0	1	1	0	0	9	2	56	28.0	31	0
2018	LAR	16	1	37	25	12	0.0	—	—	—	—	4	1	0	0.0	0	0
2019	LAR	16	3	35	31	4	0.0	2	0	12	0	7	—	—	0.0	—	—
2020	PHI	15	7	44	37	7	0.0	1	1	0	0	1	0	0	0.0	0	0
2021	DET	1	0	4	3	1	0.0	0	0	0	0	0	—	—	0.0	—	—
2022	LV	2	0	0	0	0	0.0	0	0	0	0	0	—	—	0.0	—	—
Career		129	30	338	272	62	5.0	6	6	50	1	49	6	119	19.8	41	2

Postseason
Year	Team	Games		Tackles				Fumbles				Interceptions					
Year	Team	GP	GS	Comb	Total	Ast	Sck	FF	FR	Yds	TD	PD	INT	Yds	Avg	Lng	TD
2017	LAR	1	0	3	3	0	0.0	—	—	—	—	1	—	—	0.0	—	—
2018	LAR	3	1	5	4	1	0.0	—	—	—	—	3	—	—	0.0	—	—
Career		4	1	8	7	1	0.0	0	0	0	0	4	0	0	—	0	0

== Personal life ==
In February 2010, two weeks after he signed with the Trojans, his mother, Maxine, died, aged 44. Before leaving for school that morning, he checked on her because she had recently been hospitalized, and found her on her bedroom floor. After calling paramedics, he performed CPR on her but she was to succumb later at the hospital from heart failure.

In the spring of 2014, Robey started attending transferable classes at Warner University in Florida. In 2015, he returned to USC, taking three classes, then took three more after his 2017 season with the Rams. In 2019, he finished coursework for his degree in policy, planning and development, with an emphasis in real estate development, fulfilling the promise he had made to his mother to finish college. Before the 2016 season, he added the name of his mother to his own.

In November 2018, Robey-Coleman's son Nickell Jr. died after he was born prematurely and suffered from lung complications.

Robey-Coleman, in 2019, revealed in an exchange with Neil deGrasse Tyson, that he had doubts "all his life" about the Earth being round.
