= Cameron Meredith =

American football player (born 1992)

No. 81, 1, 19
- Position: Wide receiver

Personal information
- Born: September 21, 1992 (age 34); Westchester, Illinois, U.S.
- Listed height: 6 ft 3 in (1.91 m)
- Listed weight: 207 lb (94 kg)

Career information
- High school: St. Joseph (Westchester)
- College: Illinois State
- NFL draft: 2015: undrafted

Career history
- Chicago Bears (2015–2017); New Orleans Saints (2018); New England Patriots (2019); Winnipeg Blue Bombers (2021)*
- * Offseason or practice squad member only

Career NFL statistics
- Receptions: 86
- Receiving yards: 1,122
- Receiving touchdowns: 5
- Stats at Pro Football Reference

Cameron Meredith (born September 21, 1992) is an American former professional football player who was a wide receiver in the National Football League (NFL). He played college football for the Illinois State Redbirds and was signed by the Chicago Bears as an undrafted free agent in 2015. Meredith also played for the New Orleans Saints and New England Patriots. After showing potential as a solid starting wide receiver at the beginning of his tenure with the Bears, his career was derailed by a series of injuries (an ACL tear, an MCL strain, and a partially torn meniscus).

== Early life ==
Meredith was a three-year letter winner in football, playing at quarterback for St. Joseph High School (Westchester, Illinois). His parents are Lonnie and Tonjua Meredith.

== College career ==
Meredith attended and played college football for Illinois State. He redshirted his first season and then spent the 2011 and 2012 seasons as a backup quarterback. In 2013, he transitioned to wide receiver and led the team in receptions in both 2013 and 2014. In 2014, he led the team with 66 receptions for 1,061 yards receiving, with nine touchdowns in 15 games. Being a redshirt senior with no eligibility remaining, he entered the 2015 NFL draft, but he was not invited to the NFL Combine. He impressed scouts at the Northwestern University pro day enough to earn several free agent offers.

== Professional career ==
=== Chicago Bears ===
During the 2015 NFL draft, Meredith was the victim of a prank call, a person pretending to be New England Patriots head coach Bill Belichick stating that the team would be taking him with the 97th overall pick; instead, the Patriots took defensive end Geneo Grissom and Meredith went undrafted.

Meredith signed with the Chicago Bears as an undrafted free agent.

==== 2015 season ====
On September 20, 2015, Meredith recorded his first NFL reception against the Arizona Cardinals. On October 11, Meredith caught a season-high four receptions for a season-high 52 yards against the Kansas City Chiefs. At the end of the 2015 season, Meredith finished with 11 receptions for 120 yards.

==== 2016 season ====
Meredith began his second season as the Bears' fifth wide receiver on their depth chart behind Alshon Jeffery, Kevin White, Eddie Royal, and Joshua Bellamy.

On September 25, 2016, he made his season debut against the Dallas Cowboys and finished with two receptions for 24 receiving yards. On October 9, 2016, Meredith received his first career start in place of Kevin White against the Indianapolis Colts and caught nine passes for 130 receiving yards and a touchdown. He caught his first career touchdown reception on a 14-yard pass from Brian Hoyer and fumbled twice, while losing one in the fourth quarter, costing the Bears the game. The following game, he caught eleven passes for 113 receiving yards during a 17–16 loss to the Jacksonville Jaguars, his second consecutive career 100-yard game. In Week 10, Meredith caught a season-long 50 yard touchdown reception during a 36–10 loss over the Tampa Bay Buccaneers.

On December 18, he caught nine passes for 104 receiving yards during a 30–27 loss to the Green Bay Packers. The following week, Meredith caught nine passes for a season-high 135 receiving yards and a touchdown against the Washington Redskins. It marked his fourth game of the season with over 100 yards receiving. In the Bears' 38–10 season finale loss to the Minnesota Vikings, Meredith threw his first career touchdown pass on a two-yard pass to quarterback Matt Barkley. He threw the pass to a wide open Barkley after receiving a handoff from running back Jeremy Langford, who, in turn, received it on a direct-snap.

Meredith finished the 2016 season with 66 catches for 888 yards and four touchdowns.

==== 2017 season ====
Meredith was the top wide receiver on the Bears' depth chart heading into the 2017 NFL season. He suffered a severe knee injury during the Bears' third preseason game against the Tennessee Titans. Further medical review revealed that Meredith tore his ACL and also suffered "other damage" to his knee that would force him to miss the entire 2017 season. He was placed on injured reserve on September 2, 2017.

On March 12, 2018, the Bears assigned an original round tender on Meredith worth $1.907 million.

=== New Orleans Saints ===
On April 6, 2018, the New Orleans Saints signed Meredith to a two-year offer sheet worth $9.6 million with $5.4 million in guarantees, giving the Bears five days to match the contract. On April 11, the Bears declined to match the offer sheet, officially making Meredith a member of the Saints. He was placed on injured reserve on November 8, with a knee injury. In six games with the Saints, Meredith recorded nine receptions for 114 yards and one touchdown.

On July 29, 2019, he was released by the Saints.

=== New England Patriots ===
On August 2, 2019, Meredith signed a two-year contract with the New England Patriots. He was put on the physically unable to perform (PUP) list on August 31. On October 1, Meredith was released from the PUP list.

=== Winnipeg Blue Bombers ===
On July 1, 2021, Meredith signed with the Winnipeg Blue Bombers of the Canadian Football League (CFL) after spending the 2020 season out of football.

On April 8, 2022, Meredith announced his retirement from professional football on Twitter.

=== Statistics ===
Year	Team	Rec	Yards	Avg	Lng	TD
2015	Chicago Bears	11	120	10.9	22	0
2016	Chicago Bears	66	888	13.5	50T	4
2018	New Orleans Saints	9	114	13.5	46	1
Total		86	1,122	13.0	50T	5
