= Tre'Quan Smith =

American football player (born 1996)

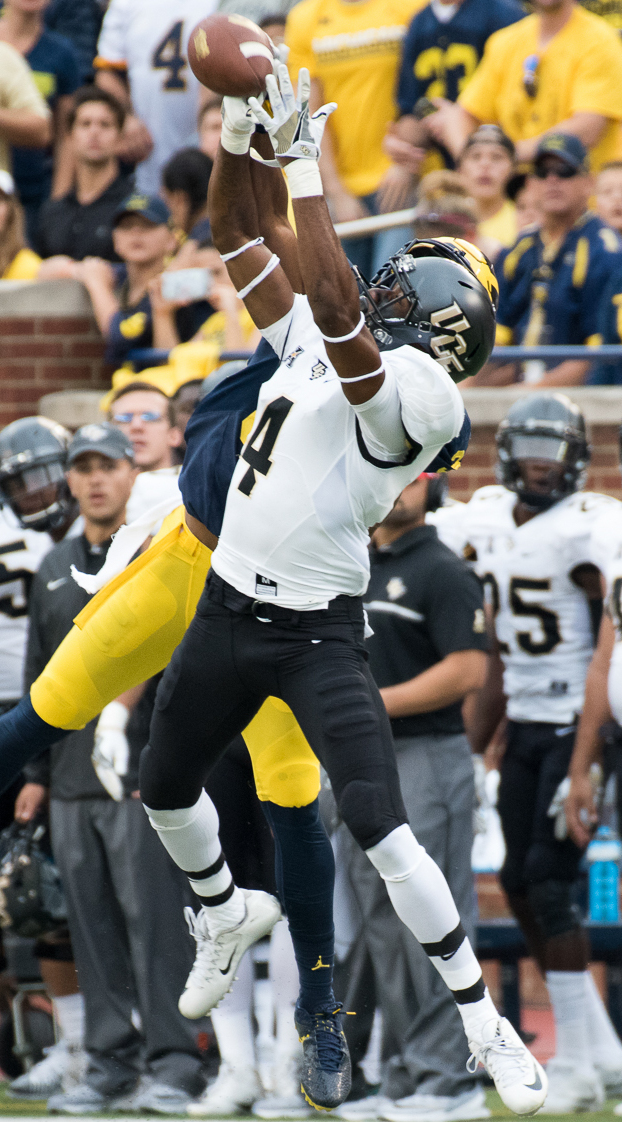
- Smith with the UCF Knights in 2016

No. 10, 81
- Position: Wide receiver

Personal information
- Born: January 7, 1996 (age 30); Delray Beach, Florida, U.S.
- Listed height: 6 ft 2 in (1.88 m)
- Listed weight: 210 lb (95 kg)

Career information
- High school: Village Academy (Delray Beach)
- College: UCF (2014–2017)
- NFL draft: 2018: 3rd round, 91st overall pick

Career history
- New Orleans Saints (2018–2023); Denver Broncos (2023); Detroit Lions (2024)

Awards and highlights
- Colley Matrix national champion (2017); Second-team All-AAC (2017); AAC Rookie Player of the Year (2015)

Career NFL statistics
- Receptions: 131
- Receiving yards: 1,764
- Receiving touchdowns: 18
- Stats at Pro Football Reference

Tre'Quan Smith (born January 7, 1996) is an American former professional football player who was a wide receiver in the National Football League (NFL). He played college football for the UCF Knights and was selected by the New Orleans Saints in the third round of the 2018 NFL draft. Smith has also played for the Denver Broncos and Detroit Lions.

== Early life ==
Smith attended Village Academy High School in Delray Beach, Florida. He did not start playing football until his freshman year in high school. Smith committed to the University of Central Florida (UCF) to play college football.

== College career ==
Smith attended and played at UCF from 2014 to 2017. During his collegiate career, Smith had 168 receptions for 2,748 yards and 22 touchdowns. After his junior season, he entered the 2018 NFL draft. Smith played in the 2018 Senior Bowl.

== Professional career ==
=== Pre-draft ===
On January 6, 2018, Smith released a statement through his Twitter account announcing his decision to forgo his remaining eligibility and declare for the 2018 NFL draft. Four days later, it was announced that Smith had accepted his invitation to play in the Senior Bowl. Although he was a redshirt junior, Smith was eligible to play since he had already graduated. Smith had a solid week of practice during the Senior Bowl and was able to maintain his draft stock. On January 27, 2018, Smith caught five receptions for 83 yards and scored on a 14-yard touchdown pass by quarterback Mike White to help the North defeat the South 45–16.

External videos
- Senior Bowl: Tre'Quan Smith's 42-yard play
- Senior Bowl: Tre'Quan Smith's 14-yard TD

Smith attended the NFL Scouting Combine in Indianapolis and completed all of the combine and positional drills. He earned the third best broad jump and 14th best time in the 40-yard dash of all players who participated. On March 29, 2018, he participated in Central Florida's pro day, but opted to stand on his combined numbers and only performed positional drills. Smith attended private workouts with the Tampa Bay Buccaneers and New York Giants. After the pre-draft process, Smith was projected to be a third or fourth round pick by NFL draft experts and scouts. He was ranked as the 10th best wide receiver in the draft by Scouts Inc. and was ranked the 11th best wide receiver by DraftScout.com.

External videos
- Tre'Quan Smith's NFL Combine Workout
- NFL Draft Profile: Tre'Quan Smith

Pre-draft measurables
Height	Weight	Arm length	Hand span	Wingspan	40-yard dash	10-yard split	20-yard split	20-yard shuttle	Three-cone drill	Vertical jump	Broad jump	Bench press
6 ft 1 3/4 in (1.87 m)	203 lb (92 kg)	33 3/8 in (0.85 m)	9 1/2 in (0.24 m)	6 ft 8 3/8 in (2.04 m)	4.49 s	1.56 s	2.65 s	4.50 s	6.97 s	37.5 in (0.95 m)	10 ft 10 in (3.30 m)	12 reps
All values from NFL Combine

External videos
- Saints draft Tre'Quan Smith 91st overall

=== New Orleans Saints ===
==== 2018 ====
The New Orleans Saints selected Smith in the third round (91st overall) in the 2018 NFL draft. He was the tenth wide receiver drafted in 2018. On May 21, 2018, the Saints signed Smith to a four-year, $3.42 million contract that includes a signing bonus of $817,024.

Smith made his NFL debut in the season opener against the Buccaneers. He did not record any receptions as the Saints lost 48–40. In the next game against the Cleveland Browns, Smith recorded his first NFL reception, which went for 18 yards during the 21–18 victory. Three weeks later on Monday Night Football against the Washington Redskins, Smith caught a 62-yard touchdown from Drew Brees, helping Brees surpass Peyton Manning for the most career passing yards in NFL history. The touchdown was part of a three-reception, 111-yard, two-touchdown performance for Smith. During a Week 11 48–7 victory over the reigning Super Bowl champion Philadelphia Eagles, he recorded ten receptions for 152 yards and a touchdown.

Smith finished his rookie year with 28 receptions for 427 yards and five touchdowns in 15 games and seven starts. The Saints finished with the #1-seed in the NFC with a 13–3 record and received a first-round postseason bye. In the postseason, Smith had two receptions for 25 yards and a five-yard rush.

==== 2019–2022 ====
During the season-opener against the Houston Texans, Smith caught two passes for 26 yards and a touchdown in the narrow 30–28 victory. Battling an ankle injury for much of the season, Smith finished his second professional season with 18 receptions for 234 yards and five touchdowns.

During Week 4 of the 2020 season against the Detroit Lions, Smith caught four passes for 54 yards and his first two touchdowns of the season in the 35–29 victory. He was placed on injured reserve on December 24, 2020. In the 2020 regular season, Smith finished with 34 receptions for 448 yards and four touchdowns in 14 games and 10 starts. On January 16, 2021, Smith was activated off of injured reserve ahead of the Divisional Round matchup against the Buccaneers. In the 30–20 loss, Smith recorded three catches for 85 yards and two touchdowns, including a 56-yard touchdown reception on a Jameis Winston trick play.

On September 10, 2021, Smith was placed on injured reserve. He was activated on October 25. In the 2021 season, Smith appeared in 11 games and started six. He finished with 32 receptions for 377 yards and three touchdowns.

On March 30, 2022, Smith re-signed with the Saints on a two-year, $6 million contract. He finished the 2022 season with 19 receptions for 278 yards and a touchdown through 15 games and six starts.

On September 9, 2023, Smith was placed on injured reserve. He was released on September 26.

=== Denver Broncos ===
On October 3, 2023, Smith was signed to the practice squad of the Denver Broncos . He played in only one game and recorded no statistics. Smith's contract expired when the team's season ended January 7, 2024.

=== Detroit Lions ===
On February 7, 2024, Smith signed a reserve/future contract with the Detroit Lions. He was placed on injured reserve on August 20.

== Career statistics ==
=== NFL ===
Regular season statistics
Year	Team	Games		Receiving					Rushing					Fumbles	
Year	Team	GP	GS	Rec	Yds	Avg	Lng	TD	Att	Yds	Avg	Lng	TD	Fum	Lost
2018	NO	15	7	28	427	15.3	62T	5	0	0	0.0	0	0	0	0
2019	NO	11	6	18	234	13.1	32	5	0	0	0.0	0	0	0	0
2020	NO	14	10	34	448	13.2	31	4	1	3	3.0	3	0	1	0
2021	NO	11	6	32	377	11.8	34	3	0	0	0.0	0	0	1	0
2022	NO	15	6	19	278	14.6	48	1	0	0	0.0	0	0	0	0
2023	NO	0	0	Did not play due to injury											
2023	DEN	1	0	0	0	0.0	0	0	0	0	0	0	0	0	0
Total		67	35	131	1,764	13.5	62T	18	1	3	3.0	3	0	2	0

Postseason statistics
Year	Team	Games		Receiving					Rushing					Fumbles	
Year	Team	GP	GS	Rec	Yds	Avg	Lng	TD	Att	Yds	Avg	Lng	TD	Fum	Lost
2018	NO	2	1	2	25	12.5	15	0	1	5	5.0	5	0	0	0
2019	NO	1	0	0	0	0.0	0	0	0	0	0.0	0	0	0	0
2020	NO	1	1	3	85	28.3	56	2	0	0	0.0	0	0	0	0
Total		4	2	5	110	22.0	56	2	1	5	5.0	5	0	0	0

=== College ===
Season	Team	GP	Receiving			
Season	Team	GP	Rec	Yds	Avg	TD
2015	UCF	12	52	724	13.9	4
2016	UCF	12	57	853	15.0	5
2017	UCF	13	59	1,171	19.8	13
Career		37	168	2,748	16.4	22
