= Tommylee Lewis =

American football player (born 1992)

Profile
- Position: Wide receiver

Personal information
- Born: October 24, 1992 (age 34); Palm Beach, Florida, U.S.
- Listed height: 5 ft 7 in (1.70 m)
- Listed weight: 174 lb (79 kg)

Career information
- High school: William T. Dwyer (Palm Beach)
- College: Northern Illinois (2011–2015)
- NFL draft: 2016: undrafted

Career history
- New Orleans Saints (2016–2018); Detroit Lions (2019)*; New Orleans Saints (2020)*; Carolina Panthers (2020)*; New Orleans Saints (2020); Miami Dolphins (2021); Calgary Stampeders (2023)
- * Offseason or practice squad member only

Awards and highlights
- First-team All-MAC (2013)

Career NFL statistics
- Receptions: 22
- Receiving yards: 264
- Receiving touchdowns: 2
- Return yards: 1,088
- Stats at Pro Football Reference

Tommylee Lewis (born October 24, 1992) is an American former professional football player who was a wide receiver and return specialist in the National Football League (NFL) and Canadian Football League (CFL). He played college football for the Northern Illinois Huskies and signed with the New Orleans Saints as an undrafted free agent in 2016. Lewis was also a member of the Detroit Lions, Carolina Panthers, Miami Dolphins, and Calgary Stampeders.

== Early life ==
Lewis began high school at Inlet Grove High School before transferring to Palm Beach Lakes Community High School. At Palm Beach Lakes, he ran into trouble off the field and struggled with academic eligibility. Lewis later transferred to William T. Dwyer High School at the insistence of former youth football teammate Curt Maggitt. At Dwyer, he was teammates with Nick O'Leary and Jacoby Brissett.

== College career ==
Lewis played college football for the Northern Illinois Huskies, the only Football Bowl Subdivision program to take interest in him. As a junior in 2013, he was named to the All-Mid-American Conference First Team and an honorable mention All-American by Sports Illustrated. In 2014, Lewis missed all but two games due to lower body injuries and was granted a medical redshirt. As a senior, he missed four games due to injury. In 48 games, Lewis caught 11 touchdown passes, had four kick return touchdowns, ran for three touchdowns and passed for one.

== Professional career ==
Pre-draft measurables
| Height | Weight | Arm length | Hand span | 40-yard dash | 10-yard split | 20-yard split | 20-yard shuttle | Three-cone drill | Vertical jump | Broad jump | Bench press |
|---|---|---|---|---|---|---|---|---|---|---|---|
| 5 ft 6 3/8 in (1.69 m) | 170 lb (77 kg) | 29 3/8 in (0.75 m) | 8 1/8 in (0.21 m) | 4.48 s | 1.58 s | 2.63 s | 4.22 s | 7.13 s | 34.0 in (0.86 m) | 10 ft 0 in (3.05 m) | 11 reps |
All values from Pro Day

=== New Orleans Saints ===
After not being selected in the 2016 NFL draft, the New Orleans Saints signed Lewis on May 2, 2016, on a recommendation from Pro Football Hall of Fame coach Bill Parcells, who was a friend of Lewis' high school coach. After impressing during training camp and the preseason as both a receiver and returner, Lewis made the Saints 53-man roster. He played in 12 games with one start, recording seven catches for 76 yards along with 312 total return yards.

Lewis recorded his first touchdown on December 7, 2017, against the Atlanta Falcons. In the 2017 season, Lewis had 10 receptions for 116 yards and a touchdown.

On September 19, 2018, Lewis was placed on injured reserve after suffering a knee injury on a punt return in Week 2 against the Cleveland Browns. He was activated off injured reserve on November 21, and scored his second career touchdown, also against the Atlanta Falcons.

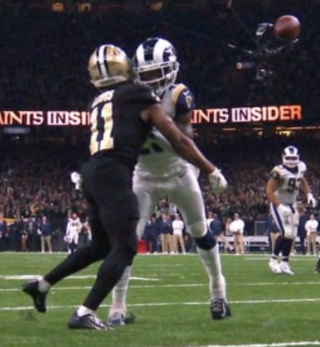
The moment Lewis was hit by Nickell Robey-Coleman

On January 20, 2019, in the final minutes of the NFC Championship Game against the Los Angeles Rams, Lewis was involved in a controversial moment with Rams cornerback Nickell Robey-Coleman. Robey-Coleman made a helmet-to-helmet hit on Lewis which would have been called for pass interference or a personal foul, but neither came about. It would have set the Saints up with a short field goal opportunity and a chance to run out the clock. However, the officials missed the call. The Saints would go on to lose the game in overtime 26–23. Later on, the league admitted that they blew the call and Robey-Coleman confessed to committing the penalty either way.

=== Detroit Lions ===
On March 19, 2019, Lewis signed with the Detroit Lions. He was released during final roster cuts on August 30.

=== New Orleans Saints (second stint) ===
On January 27, 2020, Lewis signed a reserve/future contract with the Saints. He was waived on August 2.

=== Carolina Panthers ===
On August 16, 2020, Lewis signed with the Carolina Panthers. He was waived/injured on September 2, and subsequently reverted to the team's injured reserve list the next day. Lewis was waived with an injury settlement on September 4.

=== New Orleans Saints (third stint) ===
On October 8, 2020, Lewis was signed to the Saints' practice squad. He was promoted to the active roster on October 31. He was waived on November 2 and re-signed to the practice squad two days later. Lewis was elevated to the active roster on December 5 and 12 for the team's weeks 13 and 14 games against the Atlanta Falcons and Philadelphia Eagles, and was reverted to the practice squad after each game. He was signed to the active roster on December 19, and waived on December 24. On December 30, Lewis re-signed with the Saints' practice squad. Three days later, he was elevated again for the Week 17 game against the Carolina Panthers, but was reverted to the practice squad again following the game. His practice squad contract with the team expired after the season on January 25. (Note: The Saints erroneously announced Lewis' release from the practice squad on January 16, 2021. The NFL's transactions wire on that day listed Austin Carr as the wide receiver released from the team instead. Lewis' practice squad contract instead expired on January 25.)

On July 30, 2021, Lewis signed a one-year deal with the Saints. He was waived on August 21.

=== Miami Dolphins ===
On December 13, 2021, Lewis was signed to the Miami Dolphins practice squad. He was promoted to the active roster on December 24.

=== Calgary Stampeders ===
On January 23, 2023, Lewis signed with the Calgary Stampeders of the Canadian Football League (CFL). He was released on April 2, 2024.
