= Austin Carr (American football) =

American football player (born 1993)

No. 80
- Position: Wide receiver

Personal information
- Born: December 25, 1993 (age 32); Santa Monica, California, U.S.
- Listed height: 6 ft 1 in (1.85 m)
- Listed weight: 200 lb (91 kg)

Career information
- High school: Benicia (Benicia, California)
- College: Northwestern
- NFL draft: 2017: undrafted

Career history
- New England Patriots (2017)*; New Orleans Saints (2017–2020)
- * Offseason or practice squad member only

Awards and highlights
- Second-team All-American (2016); Big Ten Receiver of the Year (2016); First-team All-Big Ten (2016)

Career NFL statistics
- Receptions: 13
- Receiving yards: 133
- Receiving touchdowns: 3
- Stats at Pro Football Reference

Austin Durant Mozée Carr (born December 25, 1993) is an American former professional football player who was a wide receiver in the National Football League (NFL). He played college football for the Northwestern Wildcats. He played in the NFL for the New England Patriots and New Orleans Saints.

== College career ==
A former walk-on at Northwestern University, Carr earned a scholarship and became a starter in his junior year. In his senior year in 2016, Carr led the Big Ten Conference in receptions, receiving yards, and receiving touchdowns. Following the 2016 season, Carr was named the Richter–Howard Receiver of the Year and was named First-team All-Big Ten by the coaches and media. Carr was a team captain for Northwestern in 2016.

=== College statistics ===
Year	Team	Games		Receiving			
Year	Team	GP	GS	Rec	Yards	Avg	TD
2012	Northwestern	Redshirt (redshirt)					
2013	Northwestern	1	0	0	0	0.0	0
2014	Northwestern	12	0	7	100	14.3	0
2015	Northwestern	11	11	16	302	18.9	2
2016	Northwestern	13	13	90	1,247	13.9	12
Career		37	24	113	1,649	14.6	14

== Professional career ==
Pre-draft measurables
Height	Weight	40-yard dash	10-yard split	20-yard split	20-yard shuttle	Three-cone drill	Vertical jump	Broad jump	Bench press
6 ft 0 in (1.83 m)	202 lb (92 kg)	4.62 s	1.60 s	2.62 s	4.07 s	6.70 s	33 1/2 in (0.85 m)	9 ft 8 in (2.95 m)	16 reps
All values from Northwestern’s Pro Day.

=== New England Patriots ===
On April 30, 2017, the New England Patriots signed Carr as an undrafted free agent to a three-year, $1.67 million contract that includes a signing bonus of $7,000. Carr shined in the preseason, recording 14 catches for 153 yards and two touchdowns in the four games. Despite a strong training camp and preseason, Carr was waived by the Patriots on September 2.

=== New Orleans Saints ===
On September 3, 2017, Carr was claimed off waivers by the New Orleans Saints. He was active for two games during his rookie season but did not catch any passes.

In 2018, Carr played in 14 games, recording nine catches for 97 yards and two touchdowns.

On November 22, 2019, Carr was placed on injured reserve.

On May 7, 2020, Carr re-signed with the Saints. He was waived on September 5, and signed to the practice squad two days later. Carr was elevated to the active roster on October 12, October 24, October 31, and November 28 for the team's weeks 5, 7, 8, and 12 games against the Los Angeles Chargers, Carolina Panthers, Chicago Bears, and Denver Broncos, and reverted to the practice squad after each game. He was signed to the active roster on December 24. Carr was waived by the Saints on January 11, 2021, and re-signed to the practice squad two days later. He was released on January 16. (Note: The Saints erroneously announced Tommylee Lewis' release from the practice squad on January 16, 2021. The NFL's transactions wire on that day listed Carr as the wide receiver released from the team instead. Lewis' practice squad contract instead expired on January 25.)

== Personal life ==
Carr is a Christian. Carr is married to Erica Carr. They have three sons together.

In November 2015, after registering with Be The Match two and a half years earlier, Carr was contacted that he may be a potential match to donate peripheral blood stem cells. Through a five-hour procedure, he was able to donate his stem cells via a blood transfusion, which ultimately saved the life of the recipient, a retired locomotive engineer for the Union-Pacific railroad who had non-Hodgkin’s lymphoma.
