= 2018 NFL season =

American football season

Regular season
- Duration: September 6, 2018 – December 30, 2018

Playoffs
- Start date: January 5, 2019
- AFC Champions: New England Patriots
- NFC Champions: Los Angeles Rams

Super Bowl LIII
- Date: February 3, 2019
- Site: Mercedes-Benz Stadium, Atlanta, Georgia
- Champions: New England Patriots

Pro Bowl
- Date: January 27, 2019
- Site: Camping World Stadium, Orlando, Florida

AFC teams: West, North, South, East
NFC teams: West, North, South, East

The 2018 NFL season was the 99th season of the National Football League (NFL) and the 53rd of the Super Bowl era. The season began on September 6, 2018, with the NFL Kickoff Game with the defending Super Bowl LII champion Philadelphia Eagles defeating the Atlanta Falcons. The season concluded with Super Bowl LIII, the league's championship game, on February 3, 2019, at Mercedes-Benz Stadium in Atlanta, Georgia, in which the New England Patriots defeated the Los Angeles Rams 13–3 for their sixth Super Bowl championship and their third title in five years.

== Player movement ==
The 2018 NFL League year and trading period began on March 14. On March 9, clubs were allowed to exercise options for 2018 on players who have option clauses in their contracts, submit qualifying offers to their pending restricted free agents and submit a Minimum Salary Tender to retain exclusive negotiating rights to their players with expiring 2017 contracts and who have fewer than three accrued seasons of free agent credit. Teams were required to be under the salary cap using the "Top-51" definition (in which the 51 highest paid-players on the team's payroll must have a combined salary cap hit below the actual cap). On March 12, clubs were allowed to contact and enter into contract negotiations with the agents of players who were set to become unrestricted free agents.

This season's salary cap increased to $177.2 million per team, up from $167 million in 2017.

=== Free agency ===
Over 550 players were eligible for some form of free agency during the free agency period. Notable players to change teams include:

- Quarterbacks Sam Bradford (Minnesota to Arizona), Kirk Cousins (Washington to Minnesota), Case Keenum (Minnesota to Denver), and A. J. McCarron (Cincinnati to Buffalo).
- Running backs Isaiah Crowell (Cleveland to New York Jets), Carlos Hyde (San Francisco to Cleveland), Frank Gore (Indianapolis to Miami), Dion Lewis (New England to Tennessee), Jerick McKinnon (Minnesota to San Francisco), and Adrian Peterson (Arizona to Washington)
- Wide receivers Danny Amendola (New England to Miami), Allen Hurns (Jacksonville to Dallas), Jordy Nelson (Green Bay to Oakland), Allen Robinson (Jacksonville to Chicago), and Sammy Watkins (Los Angeles Rams to Kansas City)
- Tight ends Jimmy Graham (Seattle to Green Bay), Austin Seferian-Jenkins (New York Jets to Jacksonville), and Marcedes Lewis (Jacksonville to Green Bay)
- Offensive linemen Cameron Fleming (New England to Dallas), Andrew Norwell (Carolina to Jacksonville), Mike Pouncey (Miami to Los Angeles Chargers), Justin Pugh (New York Giants to Arizona), Weston Richburg (New York Giants to San Francisco), Nate Solder (New England to New York Giants), Josh Sitton (Chicago to Miami), and Travis Swanson (Detroit to New York Jets)
- Defensive linemen Adrian Clayborn (Atlanta to New England), Vinny Curry (Philadelphia to Tampa Bay), Sheldon Richardson (Seattle to Minnesota), Ndamukong Suh (Miami to Los Angeles Rams), Star Lotulelei (Carolina to Buffalo), and Muhammad Wilkerson (New York Jets to Green Bay)
- Linebackers Demario Davis (New York Jets to New Orleans), Trent Murphy (Washington to Buffalo), Tahir Whitehead (Detroit to Oakland), and Avery Williamson (Tennessee to New York Jets)
- Defensive backs Malcolm Butler (New England to Tennessee), Morgan Burnett (Green Bay to Pittsburgh), T. J. Carrie (Oakland to Cleveland), Ross Cockrell (New York Giants to Carolina), E. J. Gaines (Buffalo to Cleveland), Marcus Gilchrist (Houston to Oakland), Trumaine Johnson (Los Angeles Rams to New York Jets), Tyrann Mathieu (Arizona to Houston), Rashaan Melvin (Indianapolis to Oakland), Eric Reid (San Francisco To Carolina), Patrick Robinson (Philadelphia to New Orleans), and Richard Sherman (Seattle to San Francisco)
- Kicker Sebastian Janikowski (Oakland to Seattle)
- Punter Marquette King (Oakland to Denver)

=== Trades ===
The following notable trades were made during the 2018 league year:

- March 14: Miami traded WR Jarvis Landry to Cleveland for a 2018 fourth round selection (123rd overall) and a 2019 seventh round selection.
- March 14: Buffalo traded QB Tyrod Taylor to Cleveland for a 2018 third round selection (65th overall).
- March 14: Buffalo traded T Cordy Glenn, a 2018 first round selection (21st overall), and a 2018 fifth round selection (158th overall) to Cincinnati for a 2018 first round selection (12th overall) and a 2018 sixth round selection (187th overall).
- March 14: Green Bay traded CB Damarious Randall, a 2018 fourth round selection (114th overall), and a 2018 fifth round selection (150th overall) to Cleveland for QB DeShone Kizer, a 2018 fourth round selection (101st overall), and a 2018 fifth round selection (138th overall)
- March 14: Cleveland traded DT Danny Shelton and a 2018 fifth round selection (159th overall) to New England for a 2019 third round selection.
- March 14: Kansas City traded QB Alex Smith to Washington in exchange for CB Kendall Fuller and a 2018 third round selection (78th overall).
- March 14: Kansas City traded CB Marcus Peters and a 2018 sixth round draft selection (196th overall) to the Los Angeles Rams in exchange for a 2018 fourth round selection (124th overall) and a 2019 second round selection.
- March 14: Denver traded CB Aqib Talib to the Los Angeles Rams in exchange for a 2018 fifth round selection (160th overall).
- March 14: The Los Angeles Rams traded LB Alec Ogletree and a 2019 seventh round draft selection to the New York Giants in exchange for a 2018 fourth round selection (135th overall) and a 2018 sixth round selection (176th overall).
- March 14: The Los Angeles Rams traded DE Robert Quinn and a 2018 sixth round selection to Miami in exchange for a 2018 fourth round selection and a 2018 sixth round selection.
- March 14: Seattle traded DE Michael Bennett and a 2018 seventh round selection to Philadelphia for WR Marcus Johnson and a 2018 fifth round selection.
- March 14: Philadelphia traded WR Torrey Smith to Carolina for CB Daryl Worley.
- March 18: Oakland traded WR Cordarrelle Patterson and a 2018 sixth round selection (210th overall) to New England for a 2018 fifth round selection (159th overall).
- March 22: The New York Giants traded DE Jason Pierre-Paul and their 2018 fourth round selection (102nd overall) to Tampa Bay in exchange for a 2018 third round selection (69th overall) and a 2018 fourth round selection (108th overall).
- March 29: Washington traded S Su'a Cravens, a 2018 fourth round selection (113th overall), and a 2018 fifth round selection (149th overall) to Denver in exchange for a 2018 fourth round selection (109th overall), two 2018 fifth round selections (142nd and 163rd overall), and a conditional 2020 selection.
- April 3: New England traded WR Brandin Cooks and a 2018 fourth round selection (136th overall) to the Los Angeles Rams for a 2018 first round selection (23rd overall) and a 2018 sixth round selection (198th overall).
- April 26: Pittsburgh traded WR Martavis Bryant to Oakland for a 2018 third round selection (79th overall).
- August 29: The New York Jets traded QB Teddy Bridgewater and a 2019 sixth-round selection to New Orleans for a 2019 third round selection.
- September 1: Oakland traded DE/OLB Khalil Mack, a 2020 second round selection, and a conditional 2020 fifth (eventually a seventh) round selection to Chicago in exchange for a 2019 first round selection, a 2020 first round selection, a 2020 third round selection, and a 2019 sixth round selection.
- September 17: Cleveland traded WR Josh Gordon and a conditional 2019 seventh round selection to New England in exchange for a 2019 fifth round selection.
- October 19: Cleveland traded RB Carlos Hyde to Jacksonville in exchange for a fifth round pick in the 2019 NFL Draft.
- October 23: Oakland traded WR Amari Cooper to Dallas in exchange for a 2019 first round selection.
- October 30: Denver traded WR Demaryius Thomas and a 2019 seventh round selection to Houston for a 2019 fourth round selection and a 2019 seventh round selection.
- October 30: Detroit traded WR Golden Tate to Philadelphia for a 2019 third round selection.
- October 30: Jacksonville traded DE Dante Fowler to the Los Angeles Rams for a 2019 third round selection and a 2020 fifth round selection.
- October 30: Green Bay traded S Ha Ha Clinton-Dix to Washington for a 2019 fourth round selection and RB Ty Montgomery to Baltimore for a 2020 seventh round selection.

=== Retirements ===
- S Kam Chancellor: Four-time Pro Bowler, two-time second-team All-Pro, and Super Bowl XLVIII champion. Played for Seattle during his entire eight-year career.
- CB Antonio Cromartie: Four-time Pro Bowler and one-time first-team All-Pro. Played for the San Diego Chargers, New York Jets, Arizona, and Indianapolis during his 11-year career.
- DE Elvis Dumervil: Five-time Pro Bowler and two-time first-team All-Pro. Played for the Denver, Baltimore, and San Francisco during his 12-year career.
- DE Dwight Freeney: Seven-time Pro Bowler, four-time All-Pro (three first-team, one second-team), and Super Bowl XLI champion. Played for Indianapolis, the San Diego Chargers, Arizona, Atlanta, Seattle, and Detroit during his 16-year career.
- LB James Harrison: Five-time Pro Bowler, four-time All-Pro (two first-team, two second-team), two-time Super Bowl champion (XL and XLIII), and 2008 Defensive Player of the Year. Played for Pittsburgh, Cincinnati, and New England during his 15-year career.
- WR Devin Hester: Four-time Pro Bowler and four-time All-Pro (three first-team, one second-team) as a return specialist. Played for Chicago, Atlanta, Baltimore, and Seattle during his 11-year career.
- G Richie Incognito: Four-time Pro Bowler. Played for the St. Louis Rams, Buffalo, and Miami during his 12-year career. Incognito came out of retirement to sign with Oakland in 2019.
- RB Chris Johnson: Three-time Pro Bowler, one-time first-team All-Pro, and 2009 Offensive Player of the Year. Played for Tennessee, the New York Jets, and Arizona during his 10-year career.
- C Nick Mangold: Seven-time Pro Bowler and three-time All-Pro (two first-team, one second-team). Played for the New York Jets during his entire 11-year career.
- RB DeMarco Murray: Three-time Pro Bowler, one-time first-team All-Pro, and 2014 NFL Offensive Player of the Year Played for Dallas, Philadelphia, and Tennessee during his seven-year career.
- CB Darrelle Revis: Seven-time Pro Bowler, four-time first-team All-Pro, and Super Bowl XLIX champion. Played for the New York Jets, Tampa Bay, New England, and Kansas City during his 11-year career.
- OT Joe Thomas: Ten-time Pro Bowler and nine-time All-Pro (seven first-team, two second-team). Played for Cleveland during his entire 11-year career.
- TE Jason Witten: Eleven-time Pro Bowler, four-time All-Pro (two first-team, two second-team), and 2012 Walter Payton Man of the Year. Played for Dallas during his entire 15-year career. However he came out of retirement for the 2019 NFL season, returning to Dallas.

==== Other retirements ====
- Jared Abbrederis
- Rodney Adams
- Martellus Bennett
- Joe Berger*
- Da'Quan Bowers
- Armonty Bryant
- Brent Celek
- Emmett Cleary
- Victor Cruz
- Eric Decker
- C. J. Fiedorowicz
- Matt Forte
- James Hanna
- David Harris
- Gabe Ikard
- Fred Jackson
- Vincent Jackson
- Thad Lewis
- Ryan Lindley
- Luke McCown
- Kellen Moore
- Carson Palmer
- Paul Posluszny
- Connor Shaw
- Devon Still
- Zach Strief
- Cedric Thornton
- Aaron Williams
- Eric Wood
- Danny Woodhead

=== Draft ===
The 2018 NFL draft was held from April 26 to 28 at AT&T Stadium in Arlington, Texas. This was the first draft to take place in an NFL stadium, and the first to be held in Texas. The Cleveland Browns selected Baker Mayfield with the first overall pick.

== Officiating changes ==
=== Offseason ===
The following officials were hired:

- Land Clark (Field Judge)
- Matt Edwards (Side Judge)
- Chad Hill (Side Judge)
- Anthony Jeffries (Field Judge)
- Tony Josselyn (Back Judge)
- Brian Matoren (Replay Official)
- Mark Stewart (Line Judge)
- Don Willard (Field Judge)

Four referees retired during the 2018 off-season, the most to do so since records on the statistics have been kept.

- Ed Hochuli: At the time of his retirement, Hochuli was the league's longest-tenured referee, having served with the league for 28 seasons, 26 as a head referee. He was succeeded by his son, Shawn Hochuli.
- Terry McAulay: McAulay spent 20 seasons as an official, 17 as a head referee, and officiated three Super Bowls. McAulay will work as a rules analyst for NBC's Sunday Night Football. Shawn Smith, an umpire since 2015, was promoted to replace McAulay.
- Gene Steratore: Steratore spent 15 seasons as an official and was the referee of Super Bowl LII. Steratore was involved in the controversial ruling known as the Calvin Johnson rule, as well as the infamous use of an index card during a game between the Oakland Raiders and Dallas Cowboys. He was one of two officials who also covered NCAA Division I basketball games. Steratore accepted an offer from CBS to fill its rules analyst position, which had been vacant since 2015. Umpire Clay Martin was promoted to referee to replace Steratore.
- Jeff Triplette: Triplette had spent 22 years as an official with the NFL, 19 as a head referee. Alex Kemp replaced Triplette.

Other officials retiring:

- Jim Howey (Down Judge)
- Ed Walker (Down Judge)
- Ron Marinucci (Line Judge)
- Buddy Horton (Field Judge)
- Jon Lucivansky (Field Judge)
- Laird Hayes (Side Judge)

=== In-season ===
Down judge Hugo Cruz was fired for performance-related issues culminating with a missed false start during a Week 6 game between the Los Angeles Chargers and Cleveland Browns. It was the first time in the Super Bowl era that an official was dismissed in-season.

== Rule changes ==
The following playing rule changes have been approved by the Competition Committee for the 2018 season:

- Make permanent the current rule that changes the spot of the ball after a touchback on a kickoff to the 25-yard line. Prior to 2017, the ball was placed at the 20-yard line.
- Update the standards for a "catch" to have:
  - Two feet down or any body part other than the hands
  - Control of the ball
  - Make a "football move" such as making a 3rd step, reaching/extending to the line to gain, tucking the ball away, warding off defensive players, or have the ability to perform such an act.
  The rule for receivers who were going to the ground during the catch process has been deleted. This is in response to several issues regarding the "going to the ground" rule, especially catches by Dallas Cowboys WR Dez Bryant in the 2014 NFL playoffs and one by Pittsburgh Steelers TE Jesse James in 2017 that were overturned due to this rule.
- Allow a designated member of the officiating department (for 2018, senior vice president of officiating Al Riveron, vice president officiating evaluation and development Wayne Mackie, and vice president of instant replay and administration Russel Yurk) to instruct game officials to disqualify any player who commits a flagrant non-football act on the field for a foul called on the field. This is in response to a situation where New England Patriots tight end Rob Gronkowski intentionally inflicted a late hit on Buffalo Bills defensive back Tre'Davious White causing a concussion to White. Gronkowski was not ejected for the foul on the field, but did receive a one-game suspension after the NFL's review of the play.
- Illegally batting a ball on a scrimmage down will incur a loss of down in addition to the previous 10-yard penalty.
- In overtime, when a team is ahead by 3 points, a down will run to its conclusion and all applicable points will score, even if there is a loss of possession. Previously, the offense of the trailing team could not legally score if they lost and regained possession and reached the opponent's end zone all on the same play. The rule remains that if there is a double change of possession on a play with one team in the lead, it is the last play of the game.
- If a team scores a touchdown on the final play of regulation which either gives them the victory or leaves them three or more points behind, no extra-point conversion try will be needed.
- A ball carrier may slide either head first or feet first to be considered giving himself up on the play, and he is afforded all protections previously provided to a runner sliding feet first.

The following bylaws and resolutions were passed:

- Make permanent the liberalization of workout rules for draft prospects.
- For a one-year trial period, liberalize the rules for re-signing a player on waivers.
- Players on injured reserve can be traded.
- Players with injuries deemed major can be placed directly on injured reserve without clearing waivers.
- The 10-day postseason waiver claiming period has been reduced to 1 day.
- Players can be activated from injured reserve after eight games instead of eight weeks.
- Teams have seven business days to complete an injury settlement instead of five.
- Players in certain reserve list categories cannot be reinstated after a team's week 13 game. This restriction was previously applied to the last 30 days of the regular season.
- Clarify roster procedures for players with military obligations.
- For a one-year trial period, teams may contact a player who has been publicly announced to be released before the NFL lists the transaction on a Player Personnel Notice.

The following changes to the kickoff rules were approved at the NFL Spring Owners' Meeting on May 23, 2018:

- Players are required to line up for the kickoff as follows:
  - Five players on the kicking team must be on either side of the kicker
  - At least two players on each side must be lined up outside of the numbers and at least two additional players on each side must be lined up between the numbers and the hashmarks
  - Players on the kicking team (excluding the kicker) may only line up within 1 yard of the kickoff spot (the previous limit was 5 yards)
  - The receiving team must have eight players in a 15-yard "set-up zone" (measured from the receiving team's side of the restraining line 10 yards from the kickoff spot)
- No wedge blocks. Players would only be able to do a double-team block within the "set-up zone".
- Blocking is prohibited inside the restraining zone (10 yards from the kickoff spot) until the ball touches the ground or is touched in the field of play.
- Once a kickoff lands in the end zone, it would become an automatic touchback. Players will no longer have to "kneel" in the end zone to stop the play.
- Any player(s) being disqualified are subject to replay review.
- It is now a foul (15 yards) for players to lower their helmet to initiate and make contact with an opposing player. The fouling player risks disqualification if:
  - Player lowers his helmet to establish a linear body posture prior to initiating or making contact with the helmet
  - Player delivering the blow had an unobstructed path to his opponent
  - Contact was clearly avoidable (player delivering the blow had other options)

The chain crew was reduced by one member; the "X" marker, usually unseen on television but used to mark the start of an offensive drive, was eliminated.

In response to the recent National Anthem protests in the league the past two seasons, any player or staff member who is on the field during the performance of "The Star-Spangled Banner" must stand for the duration of the performance. Such players and staff members are not required to be on the field at that time and may wait in the locker room as an alternative. The NFL will not directly fine offending players or staff members for defying the rule, instead fining the teams, who will in turn have power to fine the players or staff members at their own discretion. The National Football League Players Association filed a grievance with the league over the policy on July 11.

== 2018 deaths ==
The following people associated with the NFL (or AFL) died in 2018.

=== Members of the Pro Football Hall of Fame ===
Tommy McDonald
A 1998 inductee of the Pro Football Hall of Fame, McDonald played 12 seasons in the NFL, the majority of them with the Philadelphia Eagles, where he had the majority of his success. The six-time Pro Bowler and four-time All-Pro (first or second team) led the league in both receiving yards and receiving touchdowns in 1961 and was the last non-kicking position player to play without a facemask. He died September 24 at the age of 84.
Jim Taylor
The nine-year veteran of the Green Bay Packers was the first member of the team's 1961–1968 dynasty to be inducted into the Hall as a 1976 inductee. The fullback, who played from 1958 through the first World Championship, appeared in five Pro Bowls, was named first or second team All-Pro six times, and led the league in both rushing touchdowns and yards in 1962, leading the latter category in 1961 as well. He finished his career on the inaugural roster of the New Orleans Saints. He died October 13, aged 83.

=== Team owners ===
- Paul Allen: Allen owned the Seattle Seahawks from 1996 until his death on October 15, at the age of 65. Allen left no wife or children, and his estate is believed to be in control of his sister, Jody Allen. Allen was also the owner of the NBA's Portland Trail Blazers, and part owner of MLS's Seattle Sounders FC.
- Tom Benson: Benson owned the New Orleans Saints from 1985 until his death on March 15, at the age of 90. His wife Gayle Benson inherited the team.
- Bob McNair: McNair died November 23 at the age of 81. He had owned the Houston Texans from the time of its establishment in 2002 until his death. His wife Janice McNair and his son Cal McNair took over as owners, and the government of Harris County, Texas' minority stake in the team precludes any incoming owner from relocating the team.
- Alex Spanos: Spanos owned the Chargers from 1984 until his death; he had had senile dementia since 2008 and was not directly involved in the team's relocation from San Diego back to Los Angeles, which was largely orchestrated by his son Dean Spanos, who will head the family consortium that inherits the team. Spanos died October 9, aged 95.

=== Others ===
- Ben Agajanian
- Grady Alderman
- Willie Brown
- Billy Cannon
- Dwight Clark
- Lindon Crow
- Bennie Cunningham
- Keith Fahnhorst
- Bill Fralic
- Jim Garrett
- Chris Gedney
- Tom Heckert Jr.
- Wes Hopkins
- Wayne Huizenga
- David Humm
- Edwin Jackson
- Ron Johnson
- Billy Kinard
- Chuck Knox
- Vince Manuwai
- Dick Modzelewski
- Jeremy Nunley
- Jack Patera
- Gabriel Rivera
- Isiah Robertson
- Tim Rossovich
- Rod Rust
- Kona Schwenke
- Ed Schultz
- Clyde Scott
- Tony Sparano
- George Taliaferro
- Frank Varrichione
- Manch Wheeler
- Leon "Big Van Vader" White

== Preseason ==
Training camps for the 2018 season were held in late July through August. Teams started training camp no earlier than 15 days before the team's first scheduled preseason game.

The Pro Football Hall of Fame Game, in which the Baltimore Ravens defeated the Chicago Bears 17–16, was played on August 2; and was televised nationally by NBC. The Ravens, who made their first Hall of Fame Game appearance, were represented in the 2018 Hall of Fame class by former linebacker Ray Lewis, while the Bears were represented by former linebacker Brian Urlacher.

== Regular season ==
The 2018 regular season's 256 games were played over a 17-week schedule that began on September 6. Each of the league's 32 teams played a 16-game schedule, with one bye week for each team. The regular season concluded with a full slate of 16 games on December 30, all of which were intra-division matchups, as it had been since 2010.

=== Scheduling formula ===
Under the NFL's current scheduling formula, each team plays the other three teams in its own division twice. In addition, a team plays against all four teams in one other division from each conference. The final two games on a team's schedule are against the two remaining teams in the same conference that finished in the same position in their respective divisions (e.g., the team that finished fourth in its division will play all three other teams in the conference that also finished fourth). The division pairings for 2018 were as follows:

Intra-conference
AFC East vs AFC South
AFC West vs AFC North
NFC East vs NFC South
NFC West vs NFC North

Inter-conference
AFC East vs NFC North
AFC North vs NFC South
AFC South vs NFC East
AFC West vs NFC West

The entire season schedule was released on April 19. Highlights of the 2018 season included:

- NFL Kickoff Game: The season began with the Kickoff Game on September 6, with Atlanta at defending Super Bowl LII champion Philadelphia; Philadelphia won, 18–12.
- NFL International Series:
  - NFL London Games: Three games were played in London in 2018. All games were played at Wembley Stadium. The first game featured Seattle at Oakland, on October 14; this game was originally scheduled to be played at Tottenham Hotspur Stadium, but was relocated to Wembley when it was determined that the construction at Tottenham would not be finished in time. The two games originally slated to take place at Wembley were Tennessee at the Los Angeles Chargers on October 21 and Philadelphia at Jacksonville on October 28. This was the first time the London games were played on three consecutive weeks, a move the league has taken to try to streamline their London operations. Seattle, Los Angeles, and Philadelphia won these games.
  - NFL Mexico Game: One game, Kansas City at the Los Angeles Rams on November 19, was scheduled to take place at Estadio Azteca in Mexico City. However, due to poor field conditions resulting from recent concerts and soccer games at the facility, as well as a "difficult rainy season", the NFL announced on November 13 that the game would be moved back to the Rams' home stadium, the Los Angeles Memorial Coliseum. Although attempts were made to re-sod the field, it failed an inspection by NFL officials. The Rams would beat the Chiefs 54–51, marking the highest-scoring game in Monday Night Football history.
- Thanksgiving Day: As has been the case since 2006, three games were played on November 22: Chicago at Detroit and Washington at Dallas in the traditional afternoon doubleheader, and Atlanta at New Orleans in the primetime game. Chicago, Dallas, and New Orleans won these contests.
- Christmas Eve game: Christmas Eve, December 24, fell on a Monday in 2018. As was the case in 2007, a Monday Night Football game was scheduled between two western teams, the Denver at Oakland, with Oakland winning. This marked the teams' record 18th matchup on MNF.

=== Scheduling changes ===
When the entire season schedule was released on April 19, the league announced flexible scheduling for Saturday games in weeks 15 and 16. The final times of these games were announced on October 24:

- Week 7: The Cincinnati–Kansas City game was flexed from 1:00 p.m. ET on CBS to the 8:20 p.m. EDT slot on NBC, replacing the originally-scheduled Los Angeles Rams–San Francisco game, which was moved to 4:25 p.m. ET on CBS. This is the earliest NBC flex game since it took over the Sunday Night package in 2006.
- Week 10: The Miami–Green Bay game was moved from 1:00 p.m. ET to 4:25 p.m. ET on CBS. Additionally, the Arizona–Kansas City game, originally scheduled at 1:00 p.m. ET on Fox, was cross-flexed to CBS, in the same time slot.
- Week 11: The Minnesota–Chicago game was flexed from 1:00 p.m. ET on Fox to 8:20 p.m. ET on NBC, replacing the originally scheduled Pittsburgh–Jacksonville game which was moved to 1:00 p.m. ET on CBS. Additionally, the Philadelphia–New Orleans game was moved from 1:00 p.m. ET to 4:25 p.m. ET on Fox.
- Week 12: The Miami–Indianapolis game was moved from 1:00 p.m. ET to 4:25 p.m. ET on CBS.
- Week 13: The Los Angeles Chargers–Pittsburgh game originally scheduled for 1:00 p.m. ET on CBS was flexed to 8:20 p.m. ET on NBC, replacing the originally scheduled San Francisco–Seattle game which was moved to 4:25 p.m. ET on Fox.
- Week 14: The Los Angeles Rams–Chicago game originally scheduled for 1:00 p.m. ET on Fox was flexed to 8:20 p.m. ET on NBC, replacing the originally scheduled Pittsburgh–Oakland game which was moved to 4:25 p.m. ET on Fox.
- Week 15: The Houston–New York Jets started at 4:30 p.m., while the Cleveland–Denver game started at 8:20 p.m. EST, both games broadcast by NFL Network. And the Washington–Jacksonville game originally scheduled at 1:00 p.m. ET on Fox was cross-flexed to CBS, in the same time slot.
- Week 16: Two games were moved to Saturday, December 22 on NFL Network: the Washington–Tennessee game started at 4:30 p.m. EST, while the Baltimore–Los Angeles Chargers game started at 8:20 p.m. EST. This marked the first time that games were rescheduled to a different day (excluding games rescheduled due to severe weather) under a new deal with NFL Network this season. In addition, the New York Giants–Indianapolis game originally scheduled at 1:00 p.m. ET on Fox was cross-flexed to CBS, in the same time slot.
- Week 17: The Indianapolis–Tennessee game originally scheduled for 1:00 p.m. ET on CBS, was selected as the final 8:20 p.m. NBC Sunday Night Football game of the season, which decided the final AFC wild card spot. Also, the Cincinnati–Pittsburgh, Cleveland–Baltimore, Oakland–Kansas City, Philadelphia–Washington, and Chicago–Minnesota games were moved from 1:00 p.m. ET to 4:25 p.m. ET. with no change in network assignment.

== Regular season standings ==
=== Division ===
AFC East
| | W | L | T | PCT | DIV | CONF | PF | PA | STK |
|---|---|---|---|---|---|---|---|---|---|
| ^{(2)} New England Patriots | 11 | 5 | 0 | .688 | 5–1 | 8–4 | 436 | 325 | W2 |
| Miami Dolphins | 7 | 9 | 0 | .438 | 4–2 | 6–6 | 319 | 433 | L3 |
| Buffalo Bills | 6 | 10 | 0 | .375 | 2–4 | 4–8 | 269 | 374 | W1 |
| New York Jets | 4 | 12 | 0 | .250 | 1–5 | 3–9 | 333 | 441 | L3 |

AFC North
| | W | L | T | PCT | DIV | CONF | PF | PA | STK |
|---|---|---|---|---|---|---|---|---|---|
| ^{(4)} Baltimore Ravens | 10 | 6 | 0 | .625 | 3–3 | 8–4 | 389 | 287 | W3 |
| Pittsburgh Steelers | 9 | 6 | 1 | .594 | 4–1–1 | 6–5–1 | 428 | 360 | W1 |
| Cleveland Browns | 7 | 8 | 1 | .469 | 3–2–1 | 5–6–1 | 359 | 392 | L1 |
| Cincinnati Bengals | 6 | 10 | 0 | .375 | 1–5 | 4–8 | 368 | 455 | L2 |

AFC South
| | W | L | T | PCT | DIV | CONF | PF | PA | STK |
|---|---|---|---|---|---|---|---|---|---|
| ^{(3)} Houston Texans | 11 | 5 | 0 | .688 | 4–2 | 9–3 | 402 | 316 | W1 |
| ^{(6)} Indianapolis Colts | 10 | 6 | 0 | .625 | 4–2 | 7–5 | 433 | 344 | W4 |
| Tennessee Titans | 9 | 7 | 0 | .563 | 3–3 | 5–7 | 310 | 303 | L1 |
| Jacksonville Jaguars | 5 | 11 | 0 | .313 | 1–5 | 4–8 | 245 | 316 | L1 |

AFC West
| | W | L | T | PCT | DIV | CONF | PF | PA | STK |
|---|---|---|---|---|---|---|---|---|---|
| ^{(1)} Kansas City Chiefs | 12 | 4 | 0 | .750 | 5–1 | 10–2 | 565 | 421 | W1 |
| ^{(5)} Los Angeles Chargers | 12 | 4 | 0 | .750 | 4–2 | 9–3 | 428 | 329 | W1 |
| Denver Broncos | 6 | 10 | 0 | .375 | 2–4 | 4–8 | 329 | 349 | L4 |
| Oakland Raiders | 4 | 12 | 0 | .250 | 1–5 | 3–9 | 290 | 467 | L1 |

NFC East
| | W | L | T | PCT | DIV | CONF | PF | PA | STK |
|---|---|---|---|---|---|---|---|---|---|
| ^{(4)} Dallas Cowboys | 10 | 6 | 0 | .625 | 5–1 | 9–3 | 339 | 324 | W2 |
| ^{(6)} Philadelphia Eagles | 9 | 7 | 0 | .563 | 4–2 | 6–6 | 367 | 348 | W3 |
| Washington Redskins | 7 | 9 | 0 | .438 | 2–4 | 6–6 | 281 | 359 | L2 |
| New York Giants | 5 | 11 | 0 | .313 | 1–5 | 4–8 | 369 | 412 | L3 |

NFC North
| | W | L | T | PCT | DIV | CONF | PF | PA | STK |
|---|---|---|---|---|---|---|---|---|---|
| ^{(3)} Chicago Bears | 12 | 4 | 0 | .750 | 5–1 | 10–2 | 421 | 283 | W4 |
| Minnesota Vikings | 8 | 7 | 1 | .531 | 3–2–1 | 6–5–1 | 360 | 341 | L1 |
| Green Bay Packers | 6 | 9 | 1 | .406 | 1–4–1 | 3–8–1 | 376 | 400 | L1 |
| Detroit Lions | 6 | 10 | 0 | .375 | 2–4 | 4–8 | 324 | 360 | W1 |

NFC South
| | W | L | T | PCT | DIV | CONF | PF | PA | STK |
|---|---|---|---|---|---|---|---|---|---|
| ^{(1)} New Orleans Saints | 13 | 3 | 0 | .813 | 4–2 | 9–3 | 504 | 353 | L1 |
| Atlanta Falcons | 7 | 9 | 0 | .438 | 4–2 | 7–5 | 414 | 423 | W3 |
| Carolina Panthers | 7 | 9 | 0 | .438 | 2–4 | 5–7 | 376 | 382 | W1 |
| Tampa Bay Buccaneers | 5 | 11 | 0 | .313 | 2–4 | 4–8 | 396 | 464 | L4 |

NFC West
| | W | L | T | PCT | DIV | CONF | PF | PA | STK |
|---|---|---|---|---|---|---|---|---|---|
| ^{(2)} Los Angeles Rams | 13 | 3 | 0 | .813 | 6–0 | 9–3 | 527 | 384 | W2 |
| ^{(5)} Seattle Seahawks | 10 | 6 | 0 | .625 | 3–3 | 8–4 | 428 | 347 | W2 |
| San Francisco 49ers | 4 | 12 | 0 | .250 | 1–5 | 2–10 | 342 | 435 | L2 |
| Arizona Cardinals | 3 | 13 | 0 | .188 | 2–4 | 3–9 | 225 | 425 | L4 |

=== Conference ===
AFC
| # | Team | Division | W | L | T | PCT | DIV | CONF | SOS | SOV | STK |
|---|---|---|---|---|---|---|---|---|---|---|---|
Division leaders
| 1 (Note: Kansas City finished ahead of LA Chargers in the AFC West based on division record, claiming the No. 1 seed.) | Kansas City Chiefs | West | 12 | 4 | 0 | .750 | 5–1 | 10–2 | .480 | .401 | W1 |
| 2 (Note: New England claimed the No. 2 seed over Houston based on head-to-head victory.) | New England Patriots | East | 11 | 5 | 0 | .688 | 5–1 | 8–4 | .482 | .494 | W2 |
| 3 | Houston Texans | South | 11 | 5 | 0 | .688 | 4–2 | 9–3 | .471 | .435 | W1 |
| 4 | Baltimore Ravens | North | 10 | 6 | 0 | .625 | 3–3 | 8–4 | .496 | .450 | W3 |
Wild Cards
| 5 | Los Angeles Chargers | West | 12 | 4 | 0 | .750 | 4–2 | 9–3 | .477 | .422 | W1 |
| 6 | Indianapolis Colts | South | 10 | 6 | 0 | .625 | 4–2 | 7–5 | .465 | .456 | W4 |
Did not qualify for the postseason
| 7 | Pittsburgh Steelers | North | 9 | 6 | 1 | .594 | 4–1–1 | 6–5–1 | .504 | .448 | W1 |
| 8 | Tennessee Titans | South | 9 | 7 | 0 | .563 | 3–3 | 5–7 | .520 | .465 | L1 |
| 9 | Cleveland Browns | North | 7 | 8 | 1 | .469 | 3–2–1 | 5–6–1 | .516 | .411 | L1 |
| 10 | Miami Dolphins | East | 7 | 9 | 0 | .438 | 4–2 | 6–6 | .469 | .446 | L3 |
| 11 (Note: Denver finished ahead of Cincinnati and Buffalo based on strength of victory. Cincinnati finished ahead of Buffalo based on record vs. common opponents. Cincinnati's cumulative record against Baltimore, Indianapolis, the Los Angeles Chargers and Miami was 3–2, compared to Buffalo's 1–4 cumulative record against the same four teams.) | Denver Broncos | West | 6 | 10 | 0 | .375 | 2–4 | 4–8 | .523 | .464 | L4 |
| 12 | Cincinnati Bengals | North | 6 | 10 | 0 | .375 | 1–5 | 4–8 | .535 | .448 | L2 |
| 13 | Buffalo Bills | East | 6 | 10 | 0 | .375 | 2–4 | 4–8 | .523 | .411 | W1 |
| 14 | Jacksonville Jaguars | South | 5 | 11 | 0 | .313 | 1–5 | 4–8 | .549 | .463 | L1 |
| 15 (Note: NY Jets finished ahead of Oakland based on strength of victory.) | New York Jets | East | 4 | 12 | 0 | .250 | 1–5 | 3–9 | .506 | .438 | L3 |
| 16 | Oakland Raiders | West | 4 | 12 | 0 | .250 | 1–5 | 3–9 | .547 | .406 | L1 |
Tiebreakers (Note: When breaking ties for three or more teams under the NFL's rules, they are first broken within divisions, then comparing only the highest ranked remaining team from each division.)

NFC
| # | Team | Division | W | L | T | PCT | DIV | CONF | SOS | SOV | STK |
|---|---|---|---|---|---|---|---|---|---|---|---|
Division leaders
| 1 (Note: New Orleans finished ahead of LA Rams based on head-to-head victory, claiming the No. 1 seed.) | New Orleans Saints | South | 13 | 3 | 0 | .813 | 4–2 | 9–3 | .482 | .488 | L1 |
| 2 | Los Angeles Rams | West | 13 | 3 | 0 | .813 | 6–0 | 9–3 | .480 | .428 | W2 |
| 3 | Chicago Bears | North | 12 | 4 | 0 | .750 | 5–1 | 10–2 | .430 | .419 | W4 |
| 4 | Dallas Cowboys | East | 10 | 6 | 0 | .625 | 5–1 | 9–3 | .488 | .444 | W2 |
Wild Cards
| 5 | Seattle Seahawks | West | 10 | 6 | 0 | .625 | 3–3 | 8–4 | .484 | .400 | W2 |
| 6 | Philadelphia Eagles | East | 9 | 7 | 0 | .563 | 4–2 | 6–6 | .518 | .486 | W3 |
Did not qualify for the postseason
| 7 | Minnesota Vikings | North | 8 | 7 | 1 | .531 | 3–2–1 | 6–5–1 | .504 | .355 | L1 |
| 8 (Note: Atlanta finished ahead of Washington based on head-to-head victory. Atlanta finished ahead of Carolina based on head-to-head sweep. Washington finished ahead of Carolina based on head-to-head victory.) | Atlanta Falcons | South | 7 | 9 | 0 | .438 | 4–2 | 7–5 | .482 | .348 | W3 |
| 9 | Washington Redskins | East | 7 | 9 | 0 | .438 | 2–4 | 6–6 | .486 | .371 | L2 |
| 10 | Carolina Panthers | South | 7 | 9 | 0 | .438 | 2–4 | 5–7 | .508 | .518 | W1 |
| 11 | Green Bay Packers | North | 6 | 9 | 1 | .406 | 1–4–1 | 3–8–1 | .488 | .417 | L1 |
| 12 | Detroit Lions | North | 6 | 10 | 0 | .375 | 2–4 | 4–8 | .504 | .427 | W1 |
| 13 (Note: NY Giants finished ahead of Tampa Bay based on head-to-head victory.) | New York Giants | East | 5 | 11 | 0 | .313 | 1–5 | 4–8 | .527 | .487 | L3 |
| 14 | Tampa Bay Buccaneers | South | 5 | 11 | 0 | .313 | 2–4 | 4–8 | .523 | .506 | L4 |
| 15 | San Francisco 49ers | West | 4 | 12 | 0 | .250 | 1–5 | 2–10 | .504 | .406 | L2 |
| 16 | Arizona Cardinals | West | 3 | 13 | 0 | .188 | 2–4 | 3–9 | .527 | .302 | L4 |
Tiebreakers (Note: When breaking ties for three or more teams under the NFL's rules, they are first broken within divisions, then comparing only the highest-ranked remaining team from each division.)

== Postseason ==
The 2018 playoffs began on the weekend of January 5–6, 2019, with the Wild Card Playoff round. The four winners of those playoff games visited the top two seeds in each conference in the Divisional round games the weekend of January 12–13. The winners of those games advanced to the Conference Championship games on January 20. (In the event that both Los Angeles teams had advanced to their respective conference championships with both teams as the home team, one of the two games would have been postponed to the evening of January 21.) The 2019 Pro Bowl was held at Camping World Stadium in Orlando, Florida on January 27. Super Bowl LIII was held on February 3 at Mercedes-Benz Stadium in Atlanta.

=== Bracket ===
Jan 6 – M&T Bank Stadium | Jan 13 – Gillette Stadium
5 | LA Chargers | 23
5 | LA Chargers | 28
4 | Baltimore | 17 | Jan 20 – Arrowhead Stadium
2 | New England | 41
AFC
Jan 5 – NRG Stadium | 2 | New England | 37*
Jan 12 – Arrowhead Stadium
1 | Kansas City | 31
6 | Indianapolis | 21 | AFC Championship
6 | Indianapolis | 13
3 | Houston | 7 | Feb 3 – Mercedes-Benz Stadium
1 | Kansas City | 31
Wild-card round
Divisional round
Jan 5 – AT&T Stadium | A2 | New England | 13
Jan 12 – Los Angeles Memorial Coliseum
N2 | LA Rams | 3
5 | Seattle | 22 | Super Bowl LIII
4 | Dallas | 22
4 | Dallas | 24 | Jan 20 – Mercedes-Benz Superdome
2 | LA Rams | 30
NFC
Jan 6 – Soldier Field | 2 | LA Rams | 26*
Jan 13 – Mercedes-Benz Superdome
1 | New Orleans | 23
6 | Philadelphia | 16 | NFC Championship
6 | Philadelphia | 14
3 | Chicago | 15
1 | New Orleans | 20

* Indicates overtime victory

== Records, milestones, and notable statistics ==
Week 1

- Adrian Peterson became the ninth player to rush for 100 touchdowns in a career.

Week 2

- Frank Gore passed Curtis Martin to move up to fourth on the all-time rushing yards list with 14,103 career rushing yards.
- Patrick Mahomes became the youngest quarterback to throw six touchdown passes in a game, at age 22 years and 364 days.

Week 3

- Ryan Fitzpatrick became the first quarterback in NFL history to throw for at least 400 yards in three consecutive games.
- The Minnesota Vikings tied the record for fewest rushing attempts in a game with six. The record was previously set by the 1933 Chicago Cardinals and tied by the 2004 New England Patriots and 2006 Arizona Cardinals.

Week 4

- Adam Vinatieri kicked his 566th career field goal, breaking the record for most field goals in a career previously held by Morten Andersen.

Week 5

- Tom Brady threw his 500th career touchdown pass, becoming the third quarterback in NFL history to do so (joining Brett Favre and Peyton Manning) and becoming the first to do so playing on one team.
- Tom Brady threw a touchdown pass to a 71st different receiver, breaking an NFL record previously held by Vinny Testaverde.
- Drew Brees became the NFL's all-time leading passer with 71,941 passing yards, surpassing Brett Favre and Peyton Manning in the process.

Week 6

- Tom Brady became the first quarterback in NFL history to reach 200 regular season wins.

Week 7

- Drew Brees became the third quarterback in NFL history to defeat all 32 teams, joining Brett Favre and Peyton Manning. He also became the fourth quarterback to throw 500 career touchdown passes, joining Favre, Manning, and Tom Brady.

Week 8

- Adam Vinatieri set the record for career points scored, with 2,550, breaking a record previously held by Morten Andersen.
- Adam Thielen tied Calvin Johnson's record for eight consecutive 100-yard receiving games.

Week 10

- Julio Jones became the fastest player in NFL history to reach 10,000 receiving yards, doing so in 104 games. Jones broke the record previously held by Calvin Johnson, who took 115 games.
- Larry Fitzgerald passed Terrell Owens to move to second on the all-time receiving yards list with 15,952 career receiving yards.

Week 11

- The Kansas City Chiefs scored 51 points in a 54–51 loss to the Los Angeles Rams, the most points ever scored by a losing team in NFL history. The 105-point aggregate total is also the third highest in NFL history.
- The Philadelphia Eagles 41-point loss to the New Orleans Saints is the largest margin of defeat by a defending Super Bowl champion in NFL history since the inception of the game in 1966.

Week 12

- The Houston Texans won their eighth straight game following an 0–3 start, becoming the first team in NFL history to do so.
- Philip Rivers completed 25 consecutive passes to start a game, breaking the record of 22 consecutive completions to start a game previously held by Mark Brunell. This streak also tied Ryan Tannehill's record of 25 consecutive passes at any point in a game.
- Philip Rivers completed 28 out of 29 passes (96.6%), breaking the record for highest completion percentage in a game (minimum 20 attempts). The previous record was held by Kurt Warner who completed 92.3% of his passes.

Week 14

- Derrick Henry became the second player in NFL history to record a 99-yard rushing touchdown, joining Hall of Famer Tony Dorsett who achieved this in 1982.

Week 15

- Tom Brady became the fourth quarterback to reach 70,000 career passing yards.

Week 16

- The New England Patriots won at least ten games for the 16th straight season, tying a record set by the 1983–98 San Francisco 49ers.
- The Patriots clinched the AFC East for the tenth consecutive season (extending an NFL record for most consecutive years winning any division) and their tenth straight playoff berth, breaking the record of nine straight playoff berths previously held by the Dallas Cowboys (1975–83) and Indianapolis Colts (2002–10).
- Zach Ertz set a new NFL record for the most catches in a single season by a tight end with 113, breaking a record previously held by Jason Witten.
- Chris Jones recorded a sack in his 11th consecutive game this season, marking a new NFL record.

Week 17

- George Kittle had 1,377 receiving yards on the season, breaking the record for most receiving yards by a tight end previously held by Travis Kelce.
- Baker Mayfield threw his 27th touchdown pass of the season breaking the record for most touchdown passes by a rookie quarterback, previously shared by Peyton Manning and Russell Wilson.
- Nick Foles completed 25 consecutive passes, tying a record held by Ryan Tannehill and Philip Rivers.

Divisional round

- James White tied the all-time single-game playoff receptions record with 15. This record was previously set by Darren Sproles.
- Julian Edelman caught his 94th post-season reception, moving him past Reggie Wayne for second place all-time, behind only Jerry Rice.

Super Bowl

- The Patriots defeated the Rams, 13–3, setting a new record for fewest total points (16) scored in a Super Bowl, This record was previously held by Super Bowl VII, in which the Dolphins defeated the Redskins, 14–7 (21 points).
- Tom Brady became the first player to win six Super Bowls, surpassing Charles Haley's record of five.

== Regular season statistical leaders ==
Individual
| Scoring leader | Kaʻimi Fairbairn, Houston (150) |
| Most field goals made | Kaʻimi Fairbairn, Houston (37 FGs) |
| Touchdowns | Todd Gurley, Los Angeles Rams (21 TDs) |
| Rushing | Ezekiel Elliott, Dallas (1,434 yards) |
| Passing yards | Ben Roethlisberger, Pittsburgh (5,129 yards) |
| Passing touchdowns | Patrick Mahomes, Kansas City (50 TDs) |
| Passer rating | Drew Brees, New Orleans (115.7 rating) |
| Pass receptions | Michael Thomas, New Orleans (125 catches) |
| Pass receiving yards | Julio Jones, Atlanta (1,677 yards) |
| Combined tackles | Shaquille Leonard, Indianapolis (163 tackles) |
| Interceptions | Kyle Fuller, Chicago, Xavien Howard, Miami and Damontae Kazee, Atlanta (7) |
| Punting | Andy Lee, Arizona (4,568 yards, 48.6 average yards) |
| Sacks | Aaron Donald, Los Angeles Rams (20.5) |

== Awards ==
=== Individual season awards ===
The 8th NFL Honors, saluting the best players and plays from 2018 season, was held on February 2, 2019, at the Fox Theatre in Atlanta, Georgia.

| Award | Winner | Position | Team |
|---|---|---|---|
| AP Most Valuable Player | Patrick Mahomes | QB | Kansas City Chiefs |
| AP Offensive Player of the Year | Patrick Mahomes | QB | Kansas City Chiefs |
| AP Defensive Player of the Year | Aaron Donald | DT | Los Angeles Rams |
| AP Coach of the Year | Matt Nagy | HC | Chicago Bears |
| AP Assistant Coach of the Year | Vic Fangio | DC | Chicago Bears |
| AP Offensive Rookie of the Year | Saquon Barkley | RB | New York Giants |
| AP Defensive Rookie of the Year | Shaquille Leonard | LB | Indianapolis Colts |
| AP Comeback Player of the Year | Andrew Luck | QB | Indianapolis Colts |
| Pepsi Rookie of the Year | Saquon Barkley | RB | New York Giants |
| Walter Payton NFL Man of the Year | Chris Long | DE | Philadelphia Eagles |
| PFWA NFL Executive of the Year | Chris Ballard | GM | Indianapolis Colts |
| Super Bowl Most Valuable Player | Julian Edelman | WR | New England Patriots |

=== All-Pro team ===
The following players were named First Team All-Pro by the Associated Press:

Offense
| Quarterback | Patrick Mahomes (Kansas City) |
| Running back | Todd Gurley (Los Angeles Rams) |
| Flex | Tyreek Hill (Kansas City) |
| Wide receiver | Michael Thomas (New Orleans); DeAndre Hopkins (Houston) |
| Tight end | Travis Kelce (Kansas City) |
| Left tackle | David Bakhtiari (Green Bay) |
| Left guard | Quenton Nelson (Indianapolis) |
| Center | Jason Kelce (Philadelphia) |
| Right guard | Zack Martin (Dallas) |
| Right tackle | Mitchell Schwartz (Kansas City) |

Defense
| Edge rusher | J. J. Watt (Houston); Khalil Mack (Chicago) |
| Interior lineman | Aaron Donald (Los Angeles Rams); Fletcher Cox (Philadelphia) |
| Linebacker | Luke Kuechly (Carolina); Bobby Wagner (Seattle); Shaquille Leonard (Indianapolis) |
| Cornerback | Kyle Fuller (Chicago); Stephon Gilmore (New England) |
| Safety | Eddie Jackson (Chicago); Derwin James (Los Angeles Chargers) |

Special teams
| Placekicker | Justin Tucker (Baltimore) |
| Punter | Michael Dickson (Seattle) |
| Kick returner | Andre Roberts (New York Jets) |
| Special teams | Adrian Phillips (Los Angeles Chargers) |

=== Players of the week/month ===
The following were named the top performers during the 2018 season:

| Week/ Month | Offensive | | Defensive | | Special Teams | |
| Week/ Month | AFC | NFC | AFC | NFC | AFC | NFC |
|---|---|---|---|---|---|---|
| 1 | Patrick Mahomes QB (Chiefs) | Ryan Fitzpatrick QB (Buccaneers) | T. J. Watt OLB (Steelers) | Harrison Smith FS (Vikings) | Jakeem Grant WR-KR (Dolphins) | Greg Zuerlein K (Rams) |
| 2 | Patrick Mahomes QB (Chiefs) | Ryan Fitzpatrick QB (Buccaneers) | Shaquille Leonard OLB (Colts) | Danny Trevathan ILB (Bears) | Dane Cruikshank SS (Titans) | Robbie Gould K (49ers) |
| 3 | Ben Roethlisberger QB (Steelers) | Drew Brees QB (Saints) | Matt Milano OLB (Bills) | Efe Obada DE (Panthers) | Justin Tucker K (Ravens) | Blake Countess SS (Rams) |
| 4 | Marcus Mariota QB (Titans) | Jared Goff QB (Rams) | Jadeveon Clowney OLB (Texans) | Demario Davis ILB (Saints) | Dwayne Harris WR-KR (Raiders) | Brett Maher K (Cowboys) |
| Sept. | Patrick Mahomes QB (Chiefs) | Jared Goff QB (Rams) | J. J. Watt DE (Texans) | Khalil Mack OLB (Bears) | Justin Tucker K (Ravens) | Wil Lutz K (Saints) |
| 5 | Isaiah Crowell RB (Jets) | Drew Brees QB (Saints) | T. J. Watt OLB (Steelers) | Chandler Jones DE (Cardinals) | Denzel Ward CB (Browns) | Graham Gano K (Panthers) |
| 6 | Albert Wilson WR (Dolphins) | Todd Gurley RB (Rams) | Za'Darius Smith OLB (Ravens) | Frank Clark DE (Seahawks) | Jason Myers K (Jets) | Mason Crosby K (Packers) |
| 7 | Emmanuel Sanders WR (Broncos) | Cam Newton QB (Panthers) | Mike Mitchell FS (Colts) | Aaron Donald DT (Rams) | Dont'a Hightower OLB (Patriots) | Giorgio Tavecchio K (Falcons) |
| 8 | James Conner RB (Steelers) | Adrian Peterson RB (Redskins) | Dee Ford OLB (Chiefs) | P. J. Williams CB (Saints) | Adam Vinatieri K (Colts) | Michael Dickson P (Seahawks) |
| Oct. | James Conner RB (Steelers) | Todd Gurley RB (Rams) | Dee Ford OLB (Chiefs) | Aaron Donald DT (Rams) | Stephen Gostkowski K (Patriots) | Graham Gano K (Panthers) |
| 9 | Kareem Hunt RB (Chiefs) | Michael Thomas WR (Saints) | Desmond King CB (Chargers) | Danielle Hunter DE (Vikings) | Matt Haack P (Dolphins) | Bradley Pinion P (49ers) |
| 10 | Ben Roethlisberger QB (Steelers) | Mitchell Trubisky QB (Bears) | Wesley Woodyard ILB (Titans) | Leighton Vander Esch MLB (Cowboys) | Stephen Hauschka K (Bills) | Tress Way P (Redskins) |
| 11 | Andrew Luck QB (Colts) | Saquon Barkley RB (Giants) | Von Miller OLB (Broncos) | Samson Ebukam OLB (Rams) | Daniel Carlson K (Raiders) | Cody Parkey K (Bears) |
| 12 | Philip Rivers QB (Chargers) | Amari Cooper WR (Cowboys) | J. J. Watt DE (Texans) | Eddie Jackson S (Bears) | Cyrus Jones CB-PR (Ravens) | Sebastian Janikowski K (Seahawks) |
| Nov. | Andrew Luck QB (Colts) | Drew Brees QB (Saints) | Chris Jones DE (Chiefs) | Eddie Jackson S (Bears) | Justin Tucker K (Ravens) | Michael Dickson P (Seahawks) |
| 13 | Phillip Lindsay RB (Broncos) | Todd Gurley RB (Rams) | Xavien Howard CB (Dolphins) | Bobby Wagner LB (Seahawks) | Desmond King CB-KR (Chargers) | Aldrick Rosas K (Giants) |
| 14 | Derrick Henry RB (Titans) | Amari Cooper WR (Cowboys) | Denico Autry DE (Colts) | Darius Slay CB (Lions) | Michael Badgley K (Chargers) | Taysom Hill QB-KR (Saints) |
| 15 | Mike Williams WR (Chargers) | Dalvin Cook RB (Vikings) | Joe Haden CB (Steelers) | Grady Jarrett DT (Falcons) | Kaʻimi Fairbairn K (Texans) | Robbie Gould K (49ers) |
| 16 | Baker Mayfield QB (Browns) | Nick Foles QB (Eagles) | Patrick Onwuasor LB (Ravens) | Aaron Donald DT (Rams) | Dwayne Harris WR-KR (Raiders) | Brett Maher K (Cowboys) |
| 17 | Josh Allen QB (Bills) | Blake Jarwin TE (Cowboys) | Shaquille Leonard OLB (Colts) | Fletcher Cox DT (Eagles) | Justin Tucker K (Ravens) | Matt Prater K (Lions) |
| Dec. | Derrick Henry RB (Titans) | Chris Carson RB (Seahawks) | Shaquille Leonard OLB (Colts) | Aaron Donald DT (Rams) | Kaʻimi Fairbarn K (Texans) | Robbie Gould K (49ers) |

| Week | FedEx Air Player of the Week | FedEx Ground Player of the Week | Pepsi Rookie of the Week |
|---|---|---|---|
| 1 | Ryan Fitzpatrick (Buccaneers) | James Conner (Steelers) | Denzel Ward CB (Browns) |
| 2 | Patrick Mahomes (Chiefs) | Matt Breida (49ers) | Shaquille Leonard OLB (Colts) |
| 3 | Drew Brees (Saints) | Adrian Peterson (Redskins) | Baker Mayfield QB (Browns) |
| 4 | Mitchell Trubisky (Bears) | Alvin Kamara (Saints) | Nick Chubb RB (Browns) |
| 5 | Drew Brees (Saints) | Isaiah Crowell (Jets) | Denzel Ward CB (Browns) |
| 6 | Aaron Rodgers (Packers) | Todd Gurley (Rams) | Saquon Barkley RB (Giants) |
| 7 | Patrick Mahomes (Chiefs) | Kerryon Johnson (Lions) | Baker Mayfield QB (Browns) |
| 8 | Patrick Mahomes (Chiefs) | James Conner (Steelers) | Shaquille Leonard OLB (Colts) |
| 9 | Drew Brees (Saints) | Kareem Hunt (Chiefs) | Baker Mayfield QB (Browns) |
| 10 | Mitchell Trubisky (Bears) | Nick Chubb (Browns) | Nick Chubb RB (Browns) |
| 11 | Drew Brees (Saints) | Saquon Barkley (Giants) | Tre'Quan Smith WR (Saints) |
| 12 | Andrew Luck (Colts) | Christian McCaffrey (Panthers) | Baker Mayfield QB (Browns) |
| 13 | Philip Rivers (Chargers) | Phillip Lindsay (Broncos) | Phillip Lindsay RB (Broncos) |
| 14 | Dak Prescott (Cowboys) | Derrick Henry (Titans) | Baker Mayfield QB (Browns) |
| 15 | Philip Rivers (Chargers) | Derrick Henry (Titans) | Jaylen Samuels RB (Steelers) |
| 16 | Nick Foles (Eagles) | C. J. Anderson (Rams) | Baker Mayfield QB (Browns) |
| 17 | Dak Prescott (Cowboys) | Jordan Howard (Bears) | Baker Mayfield QB (Browns) |

| Month | Rookie of the Month | |
| Month | Offensive | Defensive |
|---|---|---|
| Sept. | Calvin Ridley WR (Falcons) | Shaquille Leonard OLB (Colts) |
| Oct. | Quenton Nelson G (Colts) | Bradley Chubb OLB (Broncos) |
| Nov. | Baker Mayfield QB (Browns) | Leighton Vander Esch OLB (Cowboys) |
| Dec. | Lamar Jackson QB (Ravens) | Tremaine Edmunds MLB (Bills) |

== Head coaching and front office personnel changes ==
=== Head coaches ===
==== Off-season ====
| Team | 2017 head coach | 2017 interim | 2018 replacement | Reason for leaving | Notes |
|---|---|---|---|---|---|
| Arizona Cardinals | Bruce Arians | | Steve Wilks | Retired | Arians retired from coaching following the 2017 season, finishing the season with a record of 8–8 (.500) and a cumulative record of 49–30–1 (.619) with two playoff appearances. Wilks was hired on January 22, after serving as a defensive coach for the Chicago Bears, San Diego Chargers, and Carolina Panthers since 2006. Wilks's only previous head coaching experience was at Savannah State in 1999. |
| Chicago Bears | John Fox | | Matt Nagy | Fired | Fox was fired after the final game of the 2017 season, finishing the season with a record of 5–11 (.313) and a cumulative record of 14–34 (.292) with no playoff appearances. Nagy spent the past five seasons as an offensive assistant with the Kansas City Chiefs, the last two as offensive coordinator; the Bears hired Nagy on January 8 and this will be his first NFL head coaching job. |
| Detroit Lions | Jim Caldwell | | Matt Patricia | Fired | Caldwell was fired after the final game of the 2017 season, finishing the season with a record of 9–7 (.563) and a cumulative record of 36–28 (.563) with two playoff appearances, but having never won a playoff game as head coach of the Lions. Patricia was hired on February 5, the day after losing Super Bowl LII as the New England Patriots defensive coordinator. He had spent his entire NFL career with the Patriots, starting in 2004 as an offensive assistant before working his way up to defensive coordinator in 2012, winning 3 Super Bowls. This will be his first head coaching job. |
| Indianapolis Colts | Chuck Pagano | | Frank Reich | Fired | Pagano was fired after the final game of the 2017 season, finishing the season with a record of 4–12 (.250), his first losing season as Colts' head coach, and a cumulative record of 53–43 (.552) with three playoff appearances. On February 6, the Colts announced that they had planned to hire New England Patriots offensive coordinator Josh McDaniels as the team's next head coach, however, McDaniels informed the Colts that he had changed his mind and was returning to the Patriots. The Colts then hired Philadelphia Eagles offensive coordinator Frank Reich, who was previously a Colts' assistant from 2008 to 2011. This will be Reich's first head coaching job. |
| New York Giants | Ben McAdoo | Steve Spagnuolo | Pat Shurmur | Fired | McAdoo became the Giants' head coach in 2016, leading the Giants to a 13–15 (.464) record over parts of two seasons with one playoff appearance. After accruing a 2–10 (.167) record and benching starter Eli Manning during the season, he was fired on December 4, 2017, and replaced in the interim by defensive coordinator Steve Spagnuolo. Shurmur was announced as the Giants' new head coach on January 22. He had previously served as the head coach of the Cleveland Browns from 2011 to 2012, compiling a record of 9–23 (.281), and an offensive coach for the Philadelphia Eagles and Minnesota Vikings since 2013. |
| Oakland Raiders | Jack Del Rio | | Jon Gruden | Fired | Del Rio was fired after the 2017 season, finishing the season with a record of 6–10 (.375) and a cumulative record of 25–23 (.521) with one playoff appearance. Gruden, who previously coached the Raiders from 1998 to 2001 and won a Super Bowl with the Tampa Bay Buccaneers in 2002, confirmed on-air on January 6, that he would be returning to the team as coach. He had spent the previous nine seasons as an on-air analyst for Monday Night Football. |
| Tennessee Titans | Mike Mularkey | | Mike Vrabel | Mutual decision | Mularkey and the Titans agreed to part ways after they "couldn't come to an agreement over the future," two days after the Titans' playoff loss to the Patriots. Mularkey had a cumulative record of 20–21 (.488) with one playoff appearance in parts of three seasons with the Titans and guided Tennessee to back-to-back 9–7 (.563) records in his two years as the team's full-time head coach. Vrabel spent the past three seasons as a defensive assistant with the Houston Texans, the last as defensive coordinator; the Titans hired Vrabel on January 20 and this will be his first NFL head coaching job. |

==== In-season ====
| Team | Departing coach | Reason for leaving | Interim replacement | Notes |
|---|---|---|---|---|
| Cleveland Browns | Hue Jackson | Fired | Gregg Williams | Jackson was fired on October 29, accumulating a 2–5–1 (.313) record during the 2018 season and a 3–36–1 (.088) record for his 2.5-season tenure with the Browns. His dismissal follows a power struggle with offensive coordinator Todd Haley (who was fired at the same time) and the team's 25th consecutive loss away from home; Jackson failed to win a single road game during his tenure and lost every game in 2017. Williams, the team's defensive coordinator, was previously the head coach of the Buffalo Bills from 2001 to 2003, with a record of 17–31 (.354). Jackson currently serves as the Special Assistant to the Head Coach for the Cincinnati Bengals. |
| Green Bay Packers | Mike McCarthy | Fired | Joe Philbin | McCarthy was fired on December 2, shortly after the Packers loss to the Arizona Cardinals. McCarthy leaves with a record of 135–85–2 (.613) with nine playoff appearances and one Super Bowl championship. Philbin, the team's offensive coordinator, was previously the head coach of the Miami Dolphins from 2012 to 2015, with a record of 24–28 (.462). |

=== Front office personnel ===
==== Off-season ====
| Team | Position | 2017 office holder | 2017 interim | 2018 replacement | Reason for leaving | Notes |
|---|---|---|---|---|---|---|
| Cleveland Browns | VP/GM | Sashi Brown | John Dorsey | | Fired | Brown was fired on December 7, 2017. He had been the team's attorney since 2013 and de facto general manager since 2016. Dorsey was named the new general manager hours later. |
| Green Bay Packers | GM | Ted Thompson | | Brian Gutekunst | Reassigned | Thompson, who had been the team's general manager since 2005, became the team's senior advisor to football operations. Brian Gutekunst, who had been the team's director of player personnel since 2016, was promoted to become the team's new general manager on January 7. |
| Houston Texans | GM | Rick Smith | | Brian Gaine | Medical leave | Smith announced that he would take a leave of absence to care for his wife, who is battling breast cancer. He will remain Executive Vice President of Football Operations. Former Buffalo Bills' vice president of player personnel, Brian Gaine, was named the new general manager on January 13, 2018. Previously, Gaine was Texans' director of pro personnel and then director of player personnel from 2014 to 2016. |
| New York Giants | GM | Jerry Reese | Kevin Abrams | Dave Gettleman | Fired | Having been in the organization since 1994, Reese was the Giants' general manager since 2007, leading them to two Super Bowl championships and several years of success. He was fired on December 4 along with head coach Ben McAdoo. He was replaced in the interim by assistant general manager Kevin Abrams. Dave Gettleman, previously general manager of the Carolina Panthers and a 14-year veteran of the Giants' front office (from 1999 to 2012), was hired on December 28, 2017. |
| Buffalo Bills | President | Russ Brandon | | Kim Pegula | Resigned | Brandon resigned his position on May 1, 2018. A newspaper report claimed that Brandon was the subject of an internal investigation regarding his personal conduct and workplace behavior, which neither the Bills nor Brandon mentioned in separate statements regarding his departure; Brandon stated he is seeking other opportunities after spending 20 years with the Bills franchise. He was immediately succeeded by co-owner Kim Pegula. |

==== In-season ====
| Team | Position | 2018 office holder | Interim replacement | 2018 Replacement | Reason for leaving | Notes |
|---|---|---|---|---|---|---|
| Oakland Raiders | GM | Reggie McKenzie | Shaun Herock | Mike Mayock | Fired | McKenzie was fired on December 10, 2018, after six-plus seasons as Raiders' GM. Herock, current teams' Director of College Scouting, served as the Raiders' interim General Manager until Oakland hired Mike Mayock on December 31, 2018. |

== Stadiums ==
Two teams, the Carolina Panthers and Oakland Raiders, entered the final year of their lease agreements with their current stadium.

=== Carolina Panthers ===
On December 17, 2017, Jerry Richardson, the Panthers' founding owner, announced he was putting the team up for sale. Richardson had previously indicated the team would be put up for sale after his death, but Richardson was accused of paying hush money to cover up questionable conduct, including racial slurs and sexually suggestive requests of employees, hastening Richardson's decision. The Panthers' lease on Bank of America Stadium expires after the 2018 season, which would allow any incoming owner to relocate the team out of Charlotte, North Carolina, to another market if they so desired, only being liable for the remaining debt from stadium renovation. At an estimated $35 million, the debt payment would be a small expense compared to the relocation fee the NFL charged for the two teams that relocated in 2016 and 2017. The two most likely candidates to buy the team as of May 2018 were David Tepper, a hedge fund manager with a higher net worth and a minority stake in the Pittsburgh Steelers but fewer ties to Charlotte; and Ben Navarro, Founder and CEO of Beemok Capital. Tepper was announced as the new owner on May 16, with the announcement coming in time for the league to vote on his bid at the owners meeting on May 19. The sale closed on July 9 with Richardson-era chief operating officer Tina Becker (who ran the franchise after Richardson stepped away from operations) resigning. Tepper immediately stated the franchise would retain the Carolina Panthers name for the time being, but that a new stadium would likely be necessary; he stated that he hoped to build said stadium in Charlotte but would not guarantee the team remains there, claiming he did not know enough about the situation to guarantee the team stays in the Charlotte area.

=== Oakland Raiders ===
The Raiders, prior to the 2017 season, committed to relocating to Las Vegas, Nevada, once a new stadium was constructed for them in 2020. In 2016, the Raiders signed a three-year extension with the Oakland Coliseum. In order to secure another season in Oakland, California, Coliseum management indicated in September 2017 that the Raiders would need to offer major concessions to compensate for the financial losses the Coliseum incurs by hosting Raiders games.

=== Naming rights agreements ===
==== Arizona Cardinals ====
On September 4, University of Phoenix Stadium, the home field of the Arizona Cardinals, was renamed State Farm Stadium. The naming rights agreement is for 18 years; however, the cost of the deal was not disclosed.

==== Denver Broncos ====
On June 20, the Denver Broncos' home stadium was renamed Broncos Stadium at Mile High. The sporting goods chain Sports Authority had held naming rights to the stadium's field (as "Sports Authority Field at Mile High") but had gone out of business in 2016. The previous signage referring to Sports Authority was removed in March. Just prior to the 2019 season, the naming rights were sold to Empower Retirement, ultimately renaming the stadium to "Empower Field at Mile High".

==== Jacksonville Jaguars ====
On February 16, EverBank Field, the home field of the Jacksonville Jaguars, was renamed TIAA Bank Field, after TIAA's 2017 acquisition of EverBank. The naming rights agreement was for 10 years and $43 million.

== Uniforms ==
=== Color Rush discontinuation ===
The Color Rush program was discontinued, and teams were no longer required to wear the special uniforms for Thursday Night Football. Teams had the option to continue using the existing Nike designs for the program as standard third jerseys.

=== Uniform changes ===
- Chicago Bears: The Bears brought back their orange alternate jerseys that the team wore from 2005 to 2009 and 2011. The team announced that the orange uniforms will be worn twice in 2018, and the team will use the navy blue "Monsters of the Midway" throwbacks for one game.
- Jacksonville Jaguars: On April 19, the Jaguars simplified their uniforms in a similar look they had used before 2013. Gold was also eliminated from their previous jerseys and the gradient black and gold helmet was reverted to an all-black gloss shell.
- Los Angeles Rams: On July 27, the Rams announced that due to overwhelming fan demand the NFL relaxed their alternate uniform policy and has permitted them to use their royal blue and yellow throwbacks as their color jerseys for the next two seasons until they present entirely new ones in 2020. When using their white jerseys, the team will still have to use their current set carried over from St. Louis albeit from slight modifications they made to them in 2017.
- Miami Dolphins: On April 19, the Dolphins simplified their uniform outlines to take after their classic aqua-and-orange look. Dark blue was removed from everything but the logo. For the second straight year, the Dolphins will wear their official throwback jerseys twice in 2018.
- Tennessee Titans: On April 4, the Titans introduced new uniforms. Most prominent among the changes is the helmet, which is changing from the white color the team had used since the 1970s (as the Houston Oilers) to navy blue. The color patterns are also simplified, with a new number typeface inspired both by Greek lettering and the shape of the state of Tennessee.

=== Throwback uniforms ===
- Pittsburgh Steelers: On May 30, the Steelers unveiled a throwback uniform, that was worn in the late 1970s. Team owner Art Rooney II announced that the team will wear the uniforms for one game.
- San Francisco 49ers: On May 23, 49ers unveiled a new all-white throwback uniform, that was worn in 1994, the year the team won its most recent Super Bowl. The team announced that they will be worn for one game.

=== Patches ===
- Green Bay Packers: On April 9, the Packers unveiled a patch to commemorate their 100th season.
- Indianapolis Colts: On April 10, the Colts unveiled a patch to commemorate their 35th season in Indianapolis.
- Los Angeles Chargers: The Chargers added a patch to commemorate the death of team owner Alex Spanos (and his wife Faye, who died in August) before Week 9's game against the Seahawks.
- New Orleans Saints: On August 9, the Saints unveiled a patch to commemorate the death of team owner Tom Benson, featuring Benson in silhouette holding his second line umbrella above his initials.
- Seattle Seahawks: On October 26, the Seahawks unveiled a patch to commemorate the death of team owner Paul Allen, featuring his "PGA" initials below the team's 12th Man flag.

== Media ==
=== Broadcast rights ===
==== Television ====
This was the fifth year under the current broadcast contracts with ESPN/ABC, CBS, Fox, and NBC. This included "cross-flexing" (switching) Sunday afternoon games between CBS and Fox before or during the season (regardless of the conference of the visiting team). NBC continued to air Sunday Night Football, the annual Kickoff game, and the primetime Thanksgiving game. ESPN continued to air Monday Night Football and the Pro Bowl, with the latter being simulcast on ABC. CBS broadcast Super Bowl LIII in English with ESPN Deportes airing the game in Spanish (the First time since 2006 in airing the game).

On January 31, the NFL announced that Fox had acquired the broadcast television rights to the Thursday Night Football package under a five-year deal (aligned with the remainder of the NFL's current broadcast contracts). Fox aired 11 games, in simulcast with NFL Network, with the remaining games in the package airing exclusively on NFL Network to satisfy its carriage contracts (with local broadcasts syndicated broadcast stations in the markets of the teams in each game). CBS and NBC had made bids to renew their previous contracts (CBS had held the rights since 2014, joined by NBC since 2016), but were reluctant to pay a higher rights fee due to the league's ratings downturn.

This was the first season that the league implemented Saturday flexible scheduling for NFL Network's late season Saturday games. Thus, it also marked the first time that games would be rescheduled to a different day (excluding games rescheduled due to severe weather). Under this system, four week 16 games were initially designated as possible matchups to be moved to Saturday. The league would then announce no later than week 8 which two of those four games would be moved and which two would remain on Sunday.

==== Digital ====
The NFL agreed to an extension of its digital rights agreement with Verizon Communications under a 5-year, $2.5 billion deal. Unlike the previous deal, it no longer includes exclusivity for streaming in-market and nationally televised NFL games on mobile devices with screens 7 inches (18 cm) or less in size (such as smartphones), in order to account for changes in viewing habits, but still includes enhanced access to highlights and other digital content for Verizon-owned properties. In addition, Verizon announced that it would no longer make these streams exclusive to Verizon Wireless subscribers, and would leverage its portfolio of media brands (such as Yahoo!, which it acquired in 2017) to distribute them to a larger audience. All of the NFL's current television partners have added mobile streaming rights (which were previously reserved to Verizon) to their existing contracts for the 2018 season, with telecasts becoming available via CBS All Access, the Fox Sports App, the ESPN app, and the NBC Sports app. Under the terms of the agreement, Verizon must give the majority of the advertising revenue to the broadcast partners.

On April 26, 2018, the NFL announced that it had reached a two-year extension of its agreement with Amazon for shared digital rights to the Thursday Night Football games simulcast with Fox, with a 15% increase in rights fees. To fulfill a request that the streams be available freely, the games will also be made available on Twitch, an Amazon-owned streaming service that was originally designed for video game streaming.

==== Radio ====
Both of the NFL's national radio contracts, Westwood One for English language and Entravision for Spanish language, expired after the 2017 season. Westwood One's parent company Cumulus Media filed for bankruptcy in November 2017 and began terminating national broadcast contracts and sports agreements in January 2018, putting any contract extensions on hold. The company emerged from bankruptcy on June 4, 2018.

With the release of the 2018 schedule, NFL.com listed ESPN Deportes Radio (which had shared NFL rights with Entravision in 2017 and had carried Super Bowl LII) as the league's national Spanish-language broadcaster. The national English-language broadcaster was still identified as Westwood One, which Westwood One has also confirmed; no press release has been issued in regard to a contract extension with that network, and it is unknown when the current arrangement was signed or when it will end. Additionally, Westwood One removed Sunday afternoon games from their package, instead focusing on the primetime matchups as well as the postseason. SportsUSA, Compass and ESPN Radio, which also has broadcast select Sunday afternoon NFL games, will continue to do so. Meanwhile, Entravision extended the Sunday night rights for 3 years, through 2021, and gained two Super Bowls, the entire AFC Playoff package, the Thursday Night Opener, and a Thanksgiving Day game as part of their new deal.

=== Personnel changes ===
All four broadcast partners will employ rules analysts for the 2018 season, citing changes in the league's rules that have become too complicated for its broadcast teams to handle. NBC hired Terry McAulay to be their rules analyst for Sunday Night Football. CBS hired Gene Steratore to fill their rules analyst position, a position that had been vacant since CBS released Mike Carey in 2015. ESPN hired Jeff Triplette for Monday Night Football. Fox retained both Mike Pereira and Dean Blandino. Additionally, Pereira assists with Fox's Thursday Night Football Coverage.

ESPN introduced a fully new broadcast team for Monday Night Football. Joe Tessitore replaced Sean McDonough as lead play-by-play man; McDonough will remain with ESPN as a college football announcer. With previous color analyst Jon Gruden returning to coaching, Monday Night Football hired Jason Witten and Booger McFarland as their color commentators; while McFarland offers his commentary from the sidelines, he fills a role similar to the "non-football" player position that Monday Night Football has traditionally relied upon in its past three-person booths (such as Howard Cosell, Dennis Miller and Tony Kornheiser). Lisa Salters, the sideline reporter, carries over from the previous broadcast team. Jeff Triplette will replace Gerald Austin as rules analyst.

Fox initially had planned to hire a new broadcast team for its Thursday Night Football, making an overture to Peyton Manning to serve as color commentator. Since Manning declined the offer, the network announced that it will be placing its existing lead broadcast team of Joe Buck and Troy Aikman on the package, reducing the number of games the duo will call on Sundays (Buck and Aikman will only call the nationally televised "America's Game of the Week" telecasts on Sundays). A version of Fox NFL Sunday will serve as the lead-in to Thursday Night Football, without Curt Menefee or Jimmy Johnson; the show will instead be hosted by panelist Michael Strahan from New York City, displacing Rich Eisen, the studio host for Thursday night pregame since the package's inception in 2006. Strahan will be joined by fellow Fox colleagues Terry Bradshaw and Howie Long.

In previous seasons, Buck did not call any NFL games during late October, working Major League Baseball playoff games instead. For 2018, Fox coordinated its schedule with MLB so that none of its scheduled broadcasts would land on a Thursday (Fox carries the NLCS and the World Series), so Buck will continue to broadcast both sports, crisscrossing the country in seven cities over a 22-day period.

In addition, NBC introduced a new studio team for Football Night in America. Mike Tirico, who was the on-site host and secondary play-by-play announcer in 2017, became the show's studio host from Stamford, Connecticut, while Liam McHugh moved into Tirico's former role. Dan Patrick, who had been the studio host for FNiA since 2008, declined to sign a long-term contract and left NBC.

On radio, Kurt Warner replaced Boomer Esiason as the color commentator for Westwood One's Monday Night Football broadcasts, after Esiason had filled the role for the previous 18 years. Esiason will continue as a studio host for CBS.

In a surprise announcement made two days before its first game, Amazon announced it would provide its own broadcast team for its eleven games, with Hannah Storm and Andrea Kremer serving as the lead broadcast team. The announcement makes Kremer the first-ever female color analyst for an NFL game, the first time a game has been broadcast with no men involved in the broadcast team, and the first time since the 1987 season of ESPN Sunday Night NFL that no former coach or player served on the broadcast team in any capacity. Amazon will offer the standard Fox broadcast team, a British broadcasting team, and a Spanish language feed as alternate audio choices.

Only one game into the pre-season, Indianapolis Colts announcer Bob Lamey, who had been with the team for most of the time since their 1984 relocation from Baltimore, retired suddenly after a complaint of him using a racial slur in the 1980s was revealed. Sideline reporter Matt Taylor was named his de facto replacement for the season.

Greg Papa, after 21 years calling play-by-play for the Oakland Raiders, joined the San Francisco 49ers as their play-by-play announcer; Papa cited an ongoing feud with Raiders owner Mark Davis for his departure. Replacing Papa with the Raiders is Brent Musburger, who came out of retirement from sports announcing to sign a three-year deal with the team that will see him serve as broadcaster through the team's relocation to Las Vegas (Musburger maintains a side business, the Vegas Sports Information Network, in Las Vegas).

=== Primetime game time shifts ===
The kick-off times for all three primetime series were moved up to start 5 to 15 minutes earlier to facilitate local newscasts and SportsCenter to start earlier and cause less disruption to late night television schedules in the Eastern and Central time zones. Thursday and Sunday Night games now kick off at 8:20 p.m. ET, while Monday Night games now kick off at 8:15 p.m. ET.

=== Most watched regular season games ===
After two years of decline, television viewership for the NFL slightly rebounded in 2018, with ratings up 3% as a whole through the first ten weeks of the season, despite a major decline (16%) in other programming on the same networks. The season finished with ratings up 5% compared to 2017.

- DH = doubleheader; SNF = NBC Sunday Night Football

| Rank | Date | Matchup | | | | Network | Viewers (millions) | TV rating | Window | Significance |
|---|---|---|---|---|---|---|---|---|---|---|
| 1 | November 22, 4:30 ET | Washington Redskins | 23 | Dallas Cowboys | 31 | Fox | 30.5 | 12.5 | Thanksgiving | Cowboys–Redskins rivalry |
| 2 | November 22, 12:30 ET | Chicago Bears | 23 | Detroit Lions | 16 | CBS | 26.5 | 12.3 | Thanksgiving | Bears–Lions rivalry |
| 3 | December 9, 4:25 ET | Philadelphia Eagles | 23 | Dallas Cowboys | 29 | Fox | 25.1 | 14.2 | Late DH^{[a]} | Cowboys–Eagles rivalry |
| 4 | December 16, 4:25 ET | New England Patriots | 10 | Pittsburgh Steelers | 17 | CBS | 24.6 | 14.2 | Late DH^{[b]} | Patriots–Steelers Rivalry |
| 5 | December 23, 4:25 ET | Pittsburgh Steelers | 28 | New Orleans Saints | 31 | CBS | 23.9 | 13.4 | Late DH^{[c]} | |
| 6 | November 4, 8:20 ET | Green Bay Packers | 17 | New England Patriots | 31 | NBC | 23.7 | 13.7 | SNF | |
| 7 | November 25, 4:25 ET | Pittsburgh Steelers | 17 | Denver Broncos | 24 | CBS | 23.7 | 13.5 | Late DH^{[d]} | Broncos–Steelers rivalry |
| 8 | September 9, 4:25 ET | Dallas Cowboys | 8 | Carolina Panthers | 16 | Fox | 23.3 | 13.1 | Late DH^{[e]} | |
| 9 | December 2, 4:25 ET | Minnesota Vikings | 10 | New England Patriots | 24 | Fox | 23.2 | 13.5 | Late DH^{[f]} | |
| 10 | September 23, 4:25 ET | Dallas Cowboys | 13 | Seattle Seahawks | 24 | Fox | 22.2 | 12.7 | Late DH^{[g]} | |

*Note – Late DH matchups listed in table are the matchups that were shown to the largest percentage of the market.

1. PHI/DAL was shown in 84% of the markets during the late doubleheader time slot of Fox coverage.
2. NE/PIT was shown in 100% of the markets during the late doubleheader time slot of CBS coverage.
3. PIT/NO was shown in 100% of the markets during the late doubleheader time slot of CBS coverage.
4. PIT/DEN was shown in 87% of the markets during the late doubleheader time slot of CBS coverage.
5. DAL/CAR was shown in 80% of the markets during the late doubleheader time slot of Fox coverage.
6. MIN/NE was shown in 90% of the markets during the late doubleheader time slot of Fox coverage.
7. DAL/SEA was shown in 85% of the markets during the late doubleheader time slot of Fox coverage.
