= Gayle Benson =

American businesswoman and sports team owner (born 1947)

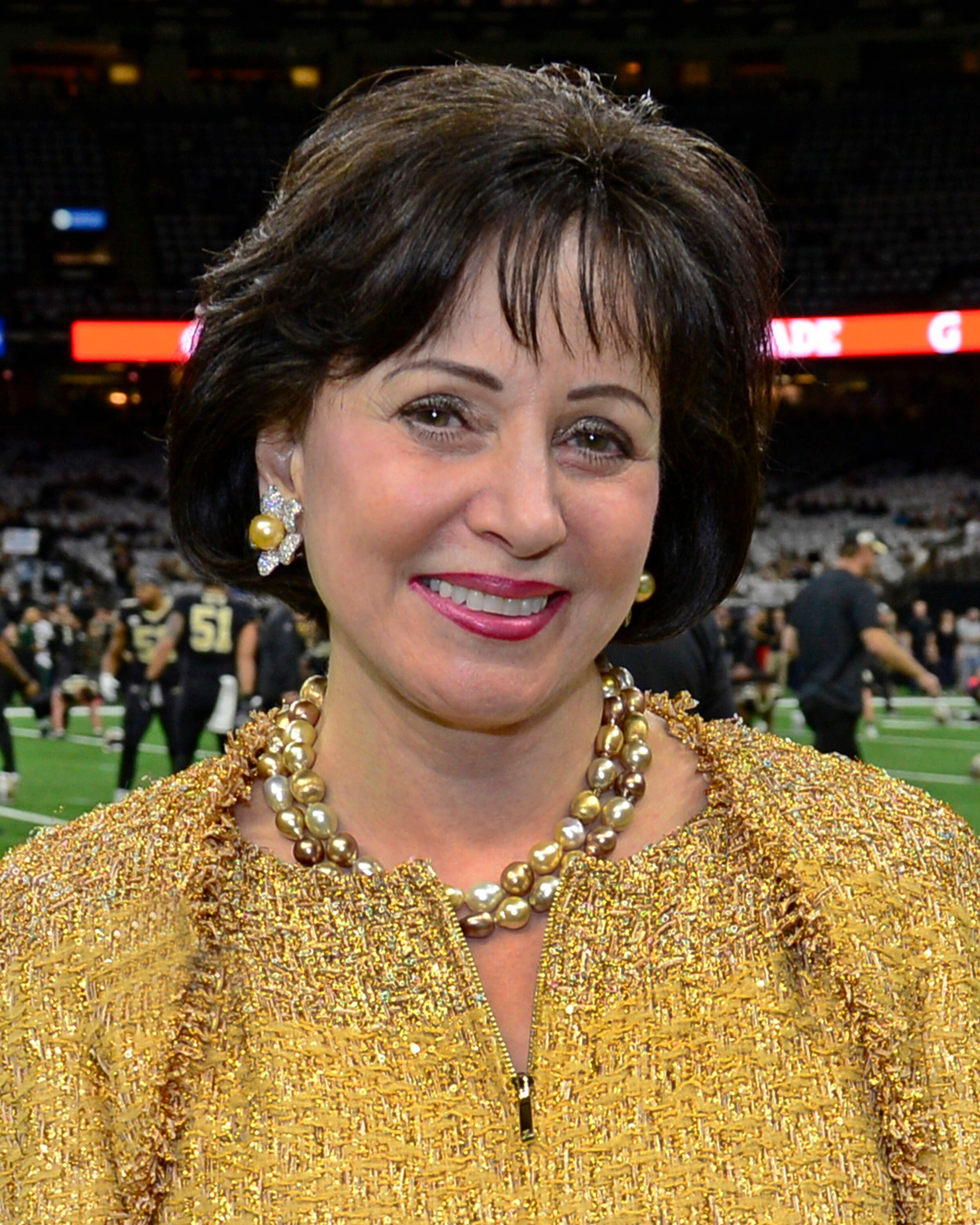
- Benson in 2018
- Born: Gayle Marie LaJaunie; January 26, 1947 (age 79); New Orleans, Louisiana, U.S.
- Occupations: Businesswoman and sports franchise owner
- Known for: Principal owner, New Orleans Saints and New Orleans Pelicans
- Spouse(s): Nace Solomone (m. 1967; div. 1972) Thomas Bird (m. 1977; div. 1987) Tom Benson (m. 2004; died 2018)

Gayle Marie LaJaunie Bird Benson (born January 26, 1947) is an American businesswoman who is the owner of the New Orleans Saints of the National Football League (NFL) and the New Orleans Pelicans of the National Basketball Association (NBA). She became the principal owner of the Saints and Pelicans following the death of her husband, Tom Benson, in 2018.

== Early life ==
The daughter of Francis J. (January 5, 1924 – July 18, 2010), and Marie LaJaunie (née Folse; July 2, 1924 – May 30, 2010), Gayle Marie LaJaunie grew up in Algiers, New Orleans, and attended St. Joseph, St. Anthony and Holy Name of Mary schools before graduating from Martin Behrman High School in 1966.

== Career ==
=== Early career ===
Benson began her career in receptionist and secretarial positions while doing interior design before buying and renovating businesses with her second husband, Thomas "T-Bird" Bird. Following their divorce, Benson continued an interior decorating business called Gayle Bird Interiors, Ltd.

In the first ten years, Gayle and her then-husband Thomas Bird, renovated one hundred properties.

=== New Orleans Saints and New Orleans Pelicans ===
Benson became the owner of both the Saints and Pelicans following the death of her husband Tom.

Benson is one of ten female NFL owners, including Sheila Ford Hamp (Detroit Lions), Kim Pegula (Buffalo Bills), Carol Davis (Oakland Raiders), Denise DeBartolo York (San Francisco 49ers), Amy Adams Strunk (Tennessee Titans), Janice McNair (Houston Texans), Jody Allen (Seattle Seahawks), Dee Haslam (Cleveland Browns), and Carlie Irsay-Gordon (Indianapolis Colts).

Benson and Allen (Portland Trail Blazers) are two of five female owners in the NBA, along with Jeanie Buss (Los Angeles Lakers), Miriam Adelson (Dallas Mavericks) and Ann Walton Kroenke (Denver Nuggets).

Tom Benson had planned on bequeathing the voting stock shares of the New Orleans Saints and New Orleans Pelicans to his daughter Renee Benson, grandson Ryan Benson LeBlanc, and granddaughter Rita Benson LeBlanc.

On December 27, 2014, Tom Benson wrote an e-mail to his daughter and two grandchildren stating he wanted "no further contact with any of you." Gayle Benson was named his heir.

Tom Benson's daughter and grandchildren filed lawsuits challenging his decision to name Gayle his heir, questioning his mental competency.

Tom Benson was determined to be mentally competent and was allowed to change his will to leave ownership of the New Orleans Saints and the New Orleans Pelicans to his wife.

=== Labor complaints ===
Rodney Henry, former personal assistant to Tom Benson, filed a lawsuit accusing the New Orleans Saints and Gayle Benson of racism and violations of federal labor laws. The lawsuit claimed that Gayle Benson had treated him with disrespect because of his race. An NFL arbitrator ruled in favor of Henry and against the Saints on the labor complaint, awarding him overtime pay, a contractual payout for his dismissal, and attorney's fees; however, the same arbitrator ruled against Henry on the claims of racism.

=== Interference in Archdiocese of New Orleans sex abuse scandal ===
According to The New York Times, under Benson's leadership "the Saints and the archdiocese (began) working together to temper the fallout from a flood of sexual abuse accusations made against priests and church employees. The abuse accusations, which span decades, have led to dozens of civil lawsuits and out-of-court settlements, more than 600 claims of abuse in the archdiocese's ongoing bankruptcy case and a handful of criminal convictions, and are part of an international reckoning for the church."

The efforts included "working closely with the archdiocese in attempting to solicit positive media coverage of the church and burnish the image of Archbishop Aymond, even writing talking points for him."

=== Dixie Brewing Company, LLC ===
In July 2017, it was announced that Tom and Gayle Benson had finalized an agreement to buy a majority share of Dixie Brewing Co. The company's brewery plant had been damaged and closed after Hurricane Katrina. On August 7, 2018, Benson announced, with New Orleans Mayor LaToya Cantrell, that Dixie Brewery would open a distribution center at the old MacFrugal's Distribution Center in New Orleans East.

== Thoroughbred racing ==
G M B Racing is the thoroughbred racing stable of Benson, who owned 2016 Kentucky Derby starters Mo Tom and Tom's Ready and owned 2018 contender Lone Sailor. Tom's Ready was a sprinter in mid-2016, winning both the Grade 2 Woody Stephens Stakes at Belmont Park and the Ack Ack Stakes at Churchill Downs.

== Personal life ==
Benson has been married three times. Her first marriage was to Nace Anthony Salomone, on April 8, 1967, which ended in a divorce and annulment in 1972. Her second marriage was to Thomas "T-Bird" Bird, on February 14, 1977, in South Pass, Plaquemines Parish, Louisiana, which ended in a divorce on June 25, 1987.

Gayle's third marriage was to Tom Benson, on October 29, 2004, in San Antonio, Texas. They met at St. Louis Cathedral in New Orleans at a mass. They were married until his death in 2018.

On October 22, 2014, Gayle Benson and her husband commemorated their tenth anniversary by renewing their wedding vows at St. Louis Cathedral.

== Philanthropy ==
While married, Gayle and Tom Benson funded the construction of the Gayle and Tom Benson Stadium at the University of the Incarnate Word in San Antonio, which opened on campus on September 1, 2008.

In January 2012, Benson and her husband were awarded the Pro Ecclesia et Pontifice for their service to Catholic Church by Pope Benedict XVI.

In November 2012, Gayle Benson and her husband, Tom, donated $7.5 million towards the construction of Tulane University's Yulman Stadium. The playing surface is known as Benson Field.

In 2015, the Benson family gave $20 million for cancer care and research.

In February 2019, the Gayle and Tom Benson Charitable Trust donated $5 million to Jesuit High School.

In March 2019, the Gayle and Tom Benson Charitable Trust donated $3.5 million to Second Harvesters Food Bank.

In September 2019, the Gayle and Tom Benson Charitable Trust donated $1 million to the campaign of Children's of Mississippi to build a playground at the University of Mississippi Medical Center.

In December 2023, Ochsner Health System announced it would be constructing a new, standalone children's hospital with a significant donation from Gayle Benson. The 343,000-square-feet facility will be named The Gayle and Tom Benson Ochsner Children's Hospital.

In December 2024, the Catholic Near East Welfare Association awarded Benson with its Faith & Culture award for her philanthropy and contributions to the promotion of human dignity.

== References continued ==
10. White, Jaquetta; Vargas, Ramon Antonio (February 3, 2015). "Tom Benson ups ante in proposal to take Saints, Pelicans out of estranged heirs' trust". theadvocate.com. The New Orleans Advocate. "Benson's lawyers also said for the first time this week that the entirety of the teams do not reside in those trusts. Attorney Paul Cordes said the various trusts contain 95 percent of the shares of Benson Basketball, the holding company for the Pelicans of the NBA. The trusts also contain 60 percent of the shares of Benson Football, the holding company for the NFL's Saints. The remaining shares are held by Tom Benson, who controls all of the voting shares in both companies. Holders of nonvoting shares typically have little or no voice on corporate matters. Such shares are usually granted to individuals who are willing to invest in the company's profitability and success without receiving voting rights in the company's direction."
  - Sayre, Katherine (February 1, 2015). "Lawyers even dispute who owns Saints now - Asset swap on hold -- or a done deal". The Times-Picayune. New Orleans. p. A1. "By last year, Tom Benson owned 40 percent of the Saints, all in voting shares, while the trusts for his heirs owned about 60 percent, all in non-voting shares, Cordes said. For the Pelicans, Benson owned 5 percent, all voting shares, and the trusts for his heirs held 95 percent, all nonvoting shares."
  - Sayre, Katherine (June 16, 2015). "Judge considers Tom Benson trust change jurisdiction". nola.com. The Times-Picayune. "Tom Benson has maintained all of the power over the Saints and Pelicans franchises by owning all of the voting shares and moving only non-voting shares into family trusts. Benson owns 40 percent of the Saints, while his heirs' trusts own 60 percent. The trusts own 95 percent of the Pelicans, with Benson owning only 5 percent -- though his portion constitutes all the Pelicans' voting shares."
  - Sayre, Katherine (June 16, 2015). "Tom Benson family feud: Saints, Pelicans ownership struggle focus of hearing". nola.com. The Times-Picayune. "Benson owns 40 percent of the Saints, while his heirs' trusts own 60 percent. The trusts own 95 percent of the Pelicans, with Benson owning only 5 percent -- though his portion constitutes all the Pelicans' voting shares."
  - Sayre, Katherine (June 17, 2015). "Judge weighs moving trust fight - Lawyer: Holding companies weren't created in La. - Trustee says New Orleans court doesn't have jurisdiction". The Times-Picayune. New Orleans. p. A1. "Schonekas, though, argued a Louisiana court doesn't necessarily have jurisdiction because assets are located in the state. As an example, he argued, if assets in the trusts were replaced with property in Montana, it wouldn't mean a Montana court has jurisdiction over Rosenthal. Meanwhile, he said, Benson was listed as a resident of Texas until he declared himself a Louisiana resident in January, as the litigation was getting underway. Benson's lawyers have said federal court is appropriate because Benson is a Louisiana resident and Rosenthal is a Texas resident, making it a federal case. Meanwhile, they argue, the question over Benson's rights to exchange assets is centered on federal tax law. *** Tom Benson has maintained all of the power over the Saints and Pelicans franchises by owning all of the voting shares and moving only non-voting shares into family trusts. Benson owns 40 percent of the Saints, while his heirs' trusts own 60 percent. The trusts own 95 percent of the Pelicans, with Benson owning only 5 percent — though his portion constitutes all the Pelicans' voting shares."
  - Devine, Dan (May 20, 2016). "In court, Pelicans owner claims family members 'tried to kill' him". sports.yahoo.com. Yahoo! Sports. "Benson wants to remove nonvoting shares of the Saints and Pelicans from their trusts; he's allowed to do that if he replaces them with equally valuable assets, but the 'mostly promissory notes' he has offered thus far are being challenged as an 'insufficient exchange' that would short-change the trustees. The trusts hold 60 percent of the Saints and 95 percent of Pelicans, all of which is non-voting stock, with Benson maintaining sole control of the teams by owning all voting stock."
  - Harper, Zach (September 1, 2016). "Trial for Tom Benson's Saints, Pelicans ownership dispute moved to February". CBS Sports. "The trusts involve include 60 percent of the Saints ownership and 95 percent of the Pelicans ownership. His grandchildren have blocked removal of the ownership shares in exchange for promissory notes because they didn't feel the stipulation of replacement for equal value was good enough."
  - Griffin, Tim (June 17, 2016). "Benson and his heirs reach settlement in contentious ownership battle". mysanantonio.com. San Antonio Express-News. "Earlier, court documents indicated that Benson said in a deposition that he removed his heirs because they tried to kill him. In the documents from the deposition, Benson said about his heirs: "You know, by picking on my wife and when I wasn't feeling very good, they were very hostile." *** The heirs' trust funds hold 95 percent of the Pelicans and 60 percent of the Saints."
  - Sayre, Katherine (June 17, 2016). "Tom Benson settles Saints, Pelicans ownership dispute". nola.com. The Times-Picayune. "The litigation involves only non-controlling stock in the franchises, meaning the shares didn't give the heirs any authority over the teams, only a financial interest. Tom Benson has remained in charge of the teams by owning all of the controlling shares. The heirs' trust funds hold 95 percent of the Pelicans and 60 percent of the Saints."
18. Hiatt, Gabe (January 22, 2015). "Spurned daughter, grandchildren sue Saints owner for writing them out of will". The Washington Post. Washington, D.C..
  - "Report: TX judge freezes large chunk of Benson assets". FOX WVUE. New Orleans. January 22, 2015. "The suit attempts to paint Gayle Benson as a gold digger who is trying to take advantage of the Saints owner's health."
  - Duncan, Jeff (January 23, 2015). "Lawsuit Claims Tom Is Confused, Gayle Is In Over Her Head". The Times-Picayune. New Orleans. p. A1. "The suit portrays Gayle Benson, 67, as a gold-digging opportunist who has taken advantage of her husband's unfit state of health and ostracized family members in grasping for power and riches. *** Meanwhile, a Texas judge ordered a temporary freeze on the money and assets in a trust controlled by Tom Benson, an order requested by his daughter, Renee Benson. The temporary restraining order, signed by Judge Thomas Rickhoff of Bexar County on Wednesday, prevents Benson from withdrawing, transferring or otherwise diminishing the value of the Shirley L. Benson Testamentary Trust. Shirley L. Benson was Benson's first wife. Gayle, Benson's third wife, was preceded by Grace. The 27-page petition reveals a series of incidents Renee, Rita and Ryan claim illustrate Tom Benson's deteriorating mental and physical health. Among them: He has been heavily medicated in the past year and has 'acknowledged on occasions that he does not know his age, where he is, what day of the week it is, nor what the date is.' His mental acuity and memory have declined so much that 'on at least one occasion (he) failed to recognize his daughter, Renee,' and 'failed to remember or commemorate her birthday.' Further, it claims he recently was asked to name the current president of the United States and replied Ronald Reagan, then guessed Harry Truman on his second attempt. His diet has diminished to the point that he rarely consumes full meals and subsists mainly on 'candy, ice cream, sodas and red wine.'"
  - "UPDATE: Judge Orders Tom Benson to Undergo Mental Evaluation". NBC KTVE. El Dorado, Arkansas. January 23, 2015. Archived from the original on September 26, 2018. "The suit attempts to paint Gayle Benson as a gold digger who is trying to take advantage of the Saints owner's health. It asks the court to appoint Renee Benson as executor of Tom Benson's sports and business empire with Rita Leblanc taking a secondary position."
  - "But we do we begin this half hour with a family inheritance battle now gone public". Today Show (Interview). New York City: NBC. January 24, 2015. "But we do we begin this half hour with a family inheritance battle now gone public. At stake is the ownership of both an NFL and an NBA team. This, after the current owner announced his plans to pass the team down to his current wife rather than on to his family as he'd originally planned. NBC's Janet Shamlian has more. *** It's a family feud with ownership of the New Orleans Saints hanging in the balance. *** Family members of eighty-seven-year-old current owner Tom Benson say he is incompetent. The claim coming in a lawsuit filed one day after Benson unexpectedly announced a change in the Saints' future ownership. Now saying the team will go to his third wife, Gayle Benson instead of his family. They released this statement: 'Sadly, the Benson family was forced to take this action in the best interest of Tom Benson and his legacy...and the multitude of Pelicans and Saints fans.' Benson also owns the NBA Pelicans team. The suit portrays sixty-seven-year-old Gayle Benson as a manipulative gold digger, capitalizing on her husband's failing health, claiming she keeps him heavily medicated, away from his family and has been feeding him a bizarre diet of candy, ice cream, sodas and red wine."
  - "Tom Benson deserves better than this squabble". The Daily Advertiser. Lafayette, Louisiana. January 25, 2015. "Gayle Benson, as wife No. 3, is cast in the stereotypical role of gold digger out to alienate the aging father from his children and seize the riches for herself."
  - Grimm, Andy (January 30, 2015). "Prenuptial agreement wouldn't keep Gayle Benson from taking over Saints, Pelicans, expert says". The Times-Picayune. New Orleans. "Renee Benson and her children filed a lawsuit seeking to declare Tom Benson incompetent to make his own decisions, and to put Renee Benson in charge of the family's fortune. Among their arguments painting Gayle Benson as a gold digger who is manipulating the family patriarch, the lawsuit notes, briefly, that when Tom Benson married the former Gayle Marie LaJaunie Bird in 2004, the couple signed the prenuptial agreement."
  - Belson, Ken (March 6, 2015). "Saints' Owner Marches Out of Step With His Heirs' Expectations". The New York Times. New York. "Is Mr. Benson feeble or frail? Is Gayle Benson a gold digger or his protector? Are his daughter and grandchildren spoiled or spurned?"

Sporting positions
Preceded by Tom Benson	New Orleans Saints owner 2018–present	Incumbent
Preceded by Tom Benson	New Orleans Pelicans owner 2018–present	Incumbent
