= Tom Benson =

American businessman and sports team owner (1927–2018)

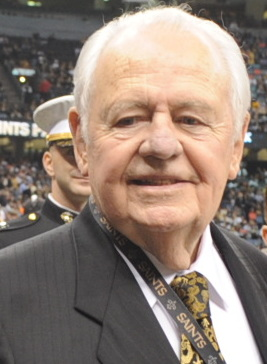
- Benson in 2009
- Born: Thomas Milton Benson Jr. July 12, 1927; New Orleans, Louisiana, U.S.
- Died: March 15, 2018 (aged 90); Jefferson, Louisiana, U.S.
- Education: St. Aloysius, 1944
- Occupations: Businessman and sports franchise owner
- Years active: 1956–2018 (62 years)
- Spouses: Shirley Landry (m. 1945; died 1980) Grace Marie Trudeau (m. 1982; died 2003) Gayle LaJaunie (m. 2004)
- Children: 3

Thomas Milton Benson Jr. (July 12, 1927 – March 15, 2018) was an American businessman, philanthropist and sports franchise owner. He was the owner of several automobile dealerships before buying the New Orleans Saints of the National Football League (NFL) in 1985 and the New Orleans Pelicans of the National Basketball Association (NBA) in 2012.

As a sports team owner, Benson had a Super Bowl victory to his credit, via the Saints winning Super Bowl XLIV (2009).

As of October 2017, he had a net worth of US$2.8 billion according to Forbes.

== Biography ==
=== Early career ===
Benson was born in New Orleans, Louisiana, to Thomas Milton Benson Sr. and Carmen Pintado. After graduating from St. Aloysius now known as Brother Martin in 1944, he went to enlist in the US Navy at the end of World War II in 1945. After the war ended, he went to study accounting at Loyola University New Orleans before dropping out in 1948. He then went to work as a car salesman at Cathey Chevrolet in New Orleans.

In 1956, he moved to San Antonio to try and revive a poorly performing dealership; he was granted a 25 percent interest in the dealership for his efforts. In 1962, he became full owner of Tom Benson Chevrolet. He was the owner of several automobile dealerships in the Greater New Orleans and San Antonio areas. Benson became wealthy by investing profits from his automobile dealerships in local banks. He eventually purchased several small Southern banks and formed Benson Financial, which he sold to Norwest Corporation in 1996.

=== New Orleans Saints ===
Benson purchased the Saints from John Mecom in 1985 after he learned from Governor Edwin W. Edwards that the team was on the verge of being sold to parties interested in moving the team to Jacksonville, Florida. Ownership of the team was officially transferred to him on May 31, 1985, with his intent that the team would stay in New Orleans.

Shortly after acquiring the Saints, Benson gained a reputation as one of the more popular and colorful owners in the league. He hired general manager Jim Finks and head coach Jim Mora, who led the Saints to their first winning season and playoff appearance.

Benson's popularity later declined, however, after numerous attempts to persuade the state of Louisiana to construct a new stadium for the Saints to replace the aging Superdome, suggesting that he might move the team elsewhere if said stadium were not built.

His popularity hit an all-time low in late 2005 after it appeared he was trying to move the team to San Antonio after Hurricane Katrina ravaged New Orleans. (See Saints relocation controversy below for more details.) He later stated that the Saints would return to New Orleans for the 2006 season, which they did. The team's fortunes improved dramatically in the years after their return, including a 31–17 defeat of the Indianapolis Colts on February 7, 2010, to win Super Bowl XLIV, and Benson recovered much of his popularity as well.

On July 18, 2008, the Benson-led Louisiana Media Company consummated their purchase of WVUE-DT, the Fox affiliate for the New Orleans area and by virtue of their affiliation, the major carrier of Saints games as part of the NFL on Fox contract. Since the sale, the station has also become the de facto home of the Saints, including coach's shows and preseason games.

Benson was well known for doing the "Benson Boogie" after Saints home victories. Benson, in New Orleans fashion, would second line dance down the field of the Superdome in the closing minutes of the game while carrying an umbrella decorated in black and gold.

During the Saints' 2001 negotiations with the state of Louisiana, rumors circulated that Benson would seek relocation if his requests—which included renovations to the Superdome, a new practice facility in suburban Metairie, and escalating annual payments from the state to the team—could not be met. The team relocated to San Antonio in 2005 when Hurricane Katrina made the Superdome unavailable, and Benson agreed to schedule negotiations to make the relocation permanent. He dismissed executive vice president Arnie Fielkow when Fielkow protested against the relocation, which prompted criticism. Benson made statements that he had not made a decision to relocate. Benson participated in a meeting with NFL Commissioner Paul Tagliabue and Louisiana governor Kathleen Blanco on October 30, and later that day he got in a physical altercation with reporters. A leaked email from Benson indicated that he feared for his life during the incident. He agreed to a deal to extend the team's lease with the Superdome on November 4. Several investors approached Benson to buy the team and keep it in Louisiana. Benson announced on December 17 that the Saints were staying in San Antonio for the 2006 season, but he retracted this and later announced that they would return to Louisiana.

=== Other ===
In 1992, Benson made a deal to acquire the Charlotte Knights AA minor league baseball team and bring them to New Orleans for the 1993 season, renaming them the "Pelicans" after New Orleans' old minor league team, but the transaction was thwarted when the Denver Zephyrs AAA team relocated to New Orleans to make way for the major league Colorado Rockies (the team became the New Orleans Zephyrs, and was later known as the New Orleans Baby Cakes). At the end of the 2019 season, the team relocated to Wichita, Kansas, where they continue as the Wichita Wind Surge.

In 1998, Benson was granted a license for a team in the Arena Football League, which finally began play in 2004 as the New Orleans VooDoo. He relinquished ownership of the VooDoo on October 13, 2008, during an owners' teleconference. By this point the entire Arena Football League was in grave financial difficulty and shortly afterward filed for bankruptcy reorganization and the 2009 season was never played. A subsequent AFL team with the same name which played in the early 2010s did so without Benson's involvement.

On April 13, 2012, Benson bought the New Orleans Hornets, now known as the New Orleans Pelicans, from the NBA for $338 million.

In 2017, Benson bought a majority stake in the Dixie Brewing Company from Joe and Kendra Bruno, with plans of returning the brewing operation to New Orleans within two years.

== Philanthropy ==
The Benson family established an endowment fund at Central Catholic High School, in San Antonio, Texas, dedicated to the memory of their son Robert Carter Benson, who graduated from the school in 1966. Tom Benson also donated the Benson Memorial Library at Central Catholic. Robert Carter Benson died of cancer in 1985, at the age of 37.

The Benson family are donors to the University of the Incarnate Word (UIW) in San Antonio. The Gayle and Tom Benson Stadium opened on September 1, 2008. The facility is used by the university's football and soccer programs.

Also in San Antonio, Texas, at St. Anthony Catholic School there is a Library named after Benson's son who died of cancer.

On September 23, 2010, Benson donated $8 million to Loyola University New Orleans in what will be called the Benson Jesuit Center.

In January 2012, Benson and his wife were awarded the Pro Ecclesia et Pontifice for their generosity to Catholic Church, the highest papal honor that Catholic laypeople can receive.

In November 2012, Benson and his wife, Gayle, donated $7.5 million towards the construction of Tulane University's Yulman Stadium. The stadium, which opened in 2014, brought the Green Wave back to campus for the first time since the demolition of Tulane Stadium in 1980. The playing surface is known as Benson Field.

In November 2014, Fawcett Stadium at the Pro Football Hall of Fame in Canton, Ohio, was renamed "Tom Benson Hall of Fame Stadium" in recognition of an $11 million donation by Tom Benson.

In 2015 the Benson family gave $20 million for cancer care and research.

== Personal life and death ==
Benson spent his final years in the exclusive Audubon Place neighborhood in New Orleans. His brother, Larry Benson, has also been in sports ownership and owned the San Antonio Riders of the World League.

Benson was married three times. His first wife was Shirley Landry who is deceased. On November 18, 2003, his second wife, Grace Marie Trudeau Benson (born March 1, 1927), died of Parkinson's disease. In October 2004, he married Gayle Marie LaJaunie Bird.

Tom Benson and his first wife Shirley adopted three children: Robert Carter Benson, Renee Benson, and Jeanne Marie Benson. Renee Benson has two adult children, Rita LeBlanc and Ryan LeBlanc. Rita Benson LeBlanc was Saints owner and executive vice president until Tom Benson fired her, her brother Ryan and her mother Renee, and wrote them out of his will. She, along with her mother Renee and brother Ryan LeBlanc, then sued Tom Benson claiming he was incompetent and for control of his companies. Benson's only living child, as of January 2015, is Renee.

All of Benson's property had in fact been put into a family trust whose governing terms, while undisclosed, required him to replace the shares of Saints and Pelicans stock owned by his daughter and grandchildren, with assets of equivalent value. Benson argued he did so by canceling millions of dollars' worth of debt and turning over $500 million in promissory notes due in about 25 years, but trust officials disagreed. The case was settled in 2017.

Benson was hospitalized on February 16, 2018, with the flu. Almost a month later, he died on March 15, 2018, at Ochsner Medical Center in Jefferson, Louisiana, at age 90.

== Awards and honors ==
- Super Bowl XLIV Champion (as owner of the New Orleans Saints)
- 2010 Best Team ESPY Award (as owner of the Saints)
- Gayle and Tom Benson Stadium in San Antonio, Texas (University of the Incarnate Word) named in his (and his wife's) honor
- Football field at Yulman Stadium in New Orleans, Louisiana (Tulane University) named "Benson Field" in his honor
- Tom Benson Hall of Fame Stadium in Canton, Ohio named in his honor
- Statue in Canton, Ohio (in front of his namesake stadium)
- Tom Benson School in Kenner, Louisiana named in his honor

== Asset controversy ==
In January 2015, after Tom Benson announced that he had cut his estranged adopted daughter Renee Benson and her adult children out of his will, he was sued by Renee and Renee's two children, Rita LeBlanc (also known as Rita Benson LeBlanc) and Ryan LeBlanc of Texas. One of Renee, Rita and Ryan's complaints in the lawsuit is "Upon information and belief, under the apparent supervision of Gayle, the diet of Tom Benson has drastically deteriorated, with him rarely consuming full, nutritious meals, but instead, for some reason, subsisting on candy, ice cream, sodas, and red wine." Renee Benson, Rita LeBlanc and Ryan LeBlanc are suing for control of Tom Benson's companies including the NFL's New Orleans Saints and the NBA's Pelicans, claiming he was "incompetent".

Benson released a statement saying that the lawsuit and claims against him by his adoptive daughter and her children were false and meritless. In February 2015, Probate Court Judge Tom Rickhoff named former San Antonio Mayor Phil Hardberger and attorney Art Bayern as co-executors of the testamentary trust of Shirley L. Benson, replacing Benson as trustees of the estate. On June 18, 2015, a judge found him competent.

On February 19, 2016, Judge Rickhoff approved the appointment of Renee Benson, Benson's estranged adopted daughter, as administrator of the $1 billion Shirley Benson Testamentary Trust, which includes the Lone Star Capital Bank in San Antonio, half of five automobile dealerships, part of a large ranch near Johnson City, Texas, a home at Lake Tahoe, Nevada, an airplane, and cash and other real estate holdings.

Benson's attorney said his client, after much wrangling and two weeks of mediation, chose to settle the dispute so as to live his remaining time at peace and to relieve himself of a hefty tax burden required on those assets.

Sporting positions
Preceded by John W. Mecom Jr.	New Orleans Saints owner 1985–2018	Succeeded by Gayle Benson
Preceded by George Shinn	New Orleans Hornets/Pelicans owner 2012–2018	Succeeded by Gayle Benson
