= Rita Benson LeBlanc =

Former Vice Chairman of the Board of the New Orleans Saints

Rita M. LeBlanc
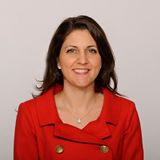
- LeBlanc, March 2010
- Born: January 7, 1977 (age 49); Houma, Louisiana, U.S.
- Education: Texas A&M University (B.S, Agribusiness, 2001)
- Occupation: NFL executive
- Years active: ca. 2002–2015
- Known for: former Vice Chairman of the Board of the New Orleans Saints
- Parent: Russell LeBlanc (father); Renee Benson (mother)
- Website: Rita Benson LeBlanc on X

Rita Mae LeBlanc, also known as Rita Benson LeBlanc (born January 11, 1977), is a former vice chairman of the board of the New Orleans Saints of the National Football League.

== Early life and education ==
LeBlanc is the daughter of Russell LeBlanc and of Renee Benson, the daughter of the late Tom Benson, who owned the New Orleans Saints and the New Orleans Pelicans prior to his death. Rita has a brother, Ryan LeBlanc.

Born in Houma, Louisiana when her family lived in nearby Cut Off, she was raised on a ranch near Johnson City, Texas, where she attended Lyndon B. Johnson High School before receiving a Bachelor of Science degree in agribusiness at Texas A&M University in 2001.

== Career ==
LeBlanc began interning for the Saints and in various league offices while still in high school, and went to work for the Saints after college. In 2003, she took over management of the New Orleans VooDoo, the Arena Football League team also owned by Benson, and was named the indoor league's top executive. (The VooDoo ceased operations in 2008.) In the aftermath of Hurricane Katrina, she began to take on a more public role and greater responsibilities in the management of the Saints.

She chairs the NFL Employee Benefits Committee, and was previously identified as Benson's intended successor as principal owner of the team. LeBlanc is on the Board of Selectors of Jefferson Awards for Public Service.

In 2012, Tom Benson suspended LeBlanc from her jobs on account of her "sense of entitlement."

== Lawsuit against grandfather ==
It was announced on January 21, 2015, by then Saints and Pelicans owner Tom Benson that Leblanc was no longer in consideration for future ownership of either franchise. She then sued him for control of his companies, claiming he was "incompetent." Tom Benson called the lawsuit meritless and false.

== Arrest ==
Rita LeBlanc was arrested for shoving a parking enforcement officer in Charleston, South Carolina. The arrest happened on Monday, June 16, 2025 when a parking enforcement officer was attempting to put a boot on her car. Charged with assault, resisting, hindering, opposing and interfering with an officer/city employee.
