= 1998 New Orleans Saints season =

NFL team season

- Head coach: Mike Ditka
- Home stadium: Louisiana Superdome

Results
- Record: 6–10
- Division place: 3rd NFC West
- Playoffs: Did not qualify
- Pro Bowlers: T Willie Roaf

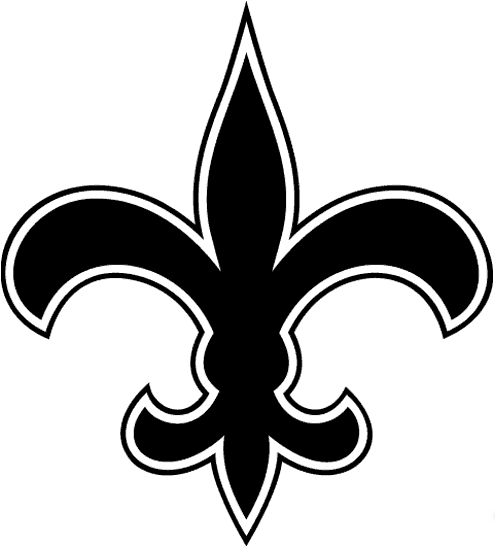
New Orleans Saints' Fleur-de-lis logo from 1967 to 1999.

The 1998 New Orleans Saints season was the team's 32nd as a member of the National Football League (NFL) and second under head coach Mike Ditka.

The Saints failed to qualify for the playoffs for the sixth consecutive season, and after a promising start of 3–0 only equalled their 6–10 record of the previous season. In the process the Saints lost to the 0–7 Carolina Panthers and were to follow this up the following season against the expansion Browns to become the only team since the NFL/AFL merger to lose to the last winless team in successive seasons.

== Offseason ==
=== NFL draft ===
1998 New Orleans Saints draft
Round	Pick	Player	Position	College	Notes
1	7	Kyle Turley *	Offensive tackle	San Diego State	
2	40	Cam Cleeland	Tight end	Washington	
4	97	Fred Weary	Cornerback	Florida	
4	99	Julian Pittman	Defensive end	Florida State	
5	132	Wilmont Perry	Running back	Livingstone	
6	161	Chris Bordano	Linebacker	SMU	
7	204	Andy McCullough	Wide receiver	Tennessee	
7	239	Ron Warner	Defensive end	Kansas	
Made roster * Made at least one Pro Bowl during career

== Personnel ==
=== Staff ===
1998 New Orleans Saints staff
Front office: Owner – Tom Benson; President/general manager/Chief Operating Officer – Bill Kuharich; Vice-president of football operations/Assistant General Manager – Chet Franklin; Director of college scouting – Bruce Lemmerman; Head coaches: Head coach – Mike Ditka; Assistant head coach/Secondary – Rick Venturi; Offensive coaches: Offensive coordinator – Danny Abramowicz; Quarterbacks – Tom Clements; Running backs – Lary Kuharich; Wide receivers – Harold Jackson; Tight ends/offensive line Assistant – Dan Neal; Offensive line – Dick Stanfel; Offensive assistant – Judd Garrett	Defensive coaches: Defensive coordinator – Zaven Yaralian; Defensive line – Walt Corey; Linebackers – Jack Del Rio; Defensive assistant – Ned James; Special teams coaches: Special teams – Bobby April; Strength and conditioning: Strength and conditioning – Mike Woicik; Assistant Strength and Conditioning – Markus Paul

=== Roster ===
1998 New Orleans Saints roster
Quarterbacks (QB): 13 Kerry Collins; 11 Billy Joe Tolliver; 7 Danny Wuerffel; Running backs (RB): 32 Aaron Craver KR; 28 Troy Davis; 33 Wilmont Perry; 36 Lamar Smith; Wide receivers (WR): 89 Brett Bech; 86 Sean Dawkins; 84 Eric Guliford; 88 Andre Hastings PR; 82 Qadry Ismail KR; 19 Alonzo Johnson; 83 Keith Poole; Tight ends (TE): 85 Cam Cleeland; 87 John Farquhar; 81 Scott Slutzker; 47 Josh Wilcox	Offensive linemen (OL): 69 Tom Ackerman C; 76 Keno Hills G/T; 74 Clarence Jones T; 67 Andy McCollum C/G; 65 Chris Naeole G; 77 Willie Roaf T; 68 Kyle Turley G/T; Defensive linemen (DL): 97 La'Roi Glover DT; 70 Uhuru Hamiter DE; 94 Joe Johnson DE; 93 Wayne Martin DT; 75 Julian Pittman DT; 95 Austin Robbins DT; 91 Brady Smith DE; 90 Jared Tomich DE; 98 Ron Warner DE; 79 Troy Wilson DE	Linebackers (LB): 54 Ink Aleaga OLB; 56 Chris Bordano MLB; 55 Mark Fields OLB; 59 Keith Mitchell OLB; 50 Kevin Mitchell MLB; 52 Vinson Smith OLB; Defensive backs (DB): 37 Chad Cota SS; 30 Je'Rod Cherry CB/S; 22 Tyronne Drakeford CB; 23 Chris Hewitt CB/S; 24 Rob Kelly FS; 29 Sammy Knight FS; 20 Earl Little SS; 25 Alex Molden CB; 42 Fred Weary CB; Special teams (ST): 10 Doug Brien K; 46 Kendall Gammon LS; 3 Mark Royals P	Practice squad: 27 Anthony Cobbs S; 9 Jake Delhomme QB; 58 Marc Lillibridge LB; 96 Rob Lurtsema DE (IR); 78 Daryl Terrell G/T; Reserve: 62 Jerry Fontenot C (IR); 12 Billy Joe Hobert QB (IR); 80 Tony Johnson TE (IR); 45 Ron Leshinski TE (Reserve/Military); 63 Troy Ridgley DT (IR); 99 Pio Sagapolutele DT (IR); 5 Heath Shuler QB (IR); 17 Gunnard Twyner WR (IR); 53 active, 9 inactive, 4 practice squad Rookies in italics

== Schedule ==
Week	Date	Opponent	Result	Record	Venue	Attendance
1	September 6	at **St. Louis Rams**	**W** 24–17	1–0	Trans World Dome	56,943
2	September 13	**Carolina Panthers**	**W** 19–14	2–0	Louisiana Superdome	51,915
3	Bye					
4	September 27	at Indianapolis Colts	**W** 19–13 (OT)	3–0	RCA Dome	48,480
5	October 4	New England Patriots	**L** 27–30	3–1	Louisiana Superdome	56,172
6	October 11	**San Francisco 49ers**	**L** 0–31	3–2	Louisiana Superdome	62,811
7	October 18	at **Atlanta Falcons**	**L** 23–31	3–3	Georgia Dome	60,774
8	October 25	Tampa Bay Buccaneers	**W** 9–3	4–3	Louisiana Superdome	52,695
9	November 1	at **Carolina Panthers**	**L** 17–31	4–4	Ericcson Stadium	62,514
10	November 8	at Minnesota Vikings	**L** 24–31	4–5	Hubert H. Humphrey Metrodome	63,779
11	November 15	**St. Louis Rams**	**W** 24–3	5–5	Louisiana Superdome	46,430
12	November 22	at **San Francisco 49ers**	**L** 20–31	5–6	3Com Park	68,429
13	November 29	at Miami Dolphins	**L** 10–30	5–7	Pro Player Stadium	73,216
14	December 6	Dallas Cowboys	**W** 22–3	6–7	Louisiana Superdome	65,065
15	December 13	**Atlanta Falcons**	**L** 17–27	6–8	Louisiana Superdome	61,678
16	December 20	at Arizona Cardinals	**L** 17–19	6–9	Sun Devil Stadium	51,617
17	December 27	Buffalo Bills	**L** 33–45	6–10	Louisiana Superdome	39,707
Note: Intra-division opponents are in **bold** text.

== Standings ==
NFC West
	W	L	T	PCT	PF	PA	STK
^{(2)} Atlanta Falcons	14	2	0	.875	442	289	W9
^{(4)} San Francisco 49ers	12	4	0	.750	479	328	W1
New Orleans Saints	6	10	0	.375	305	359	L3
Carolina Panthers	4	12	0	.250	336	413	W2
St. Louis Rams	4	12	0	.250	285	378	L2
