= 1999 New Orleans Saints season =

NFL team season

- Owner: Tom Benson
- General manager: Bill Kuharich
- Head coach: Mike Ditka
- Offensive coordinator: Danny Abramowicz
- Defensive coordinator: Zaven Yaralian
- Home stadium: Louisiana Superdome

Results
- Record: 3–13
- Division place: 5th NFC West
- Playoffs: Did not qualify
- Pro Bowlers: T Willie Roaf

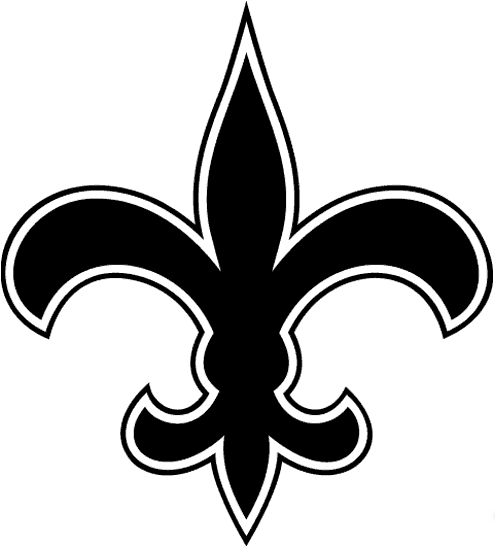
New Orleans Saints' Fleur-de-lis logo from 1967 to 1999.

The 1999 New Orleans Saints season was the Saints' thirty-third season in the National Football League (NFL). This was Mike Ditka's third and final season as the Saints' head coach, as he was fired, along with his entire coaching staff and general manager Bill Kuharich, three days after the conclusion of the season.

This was the final season that the Saints used their primary Fleur-de-lis logo. Beginning the next season, the logo was slightly upgraded into a more 3D-esque design, which the team still uses today.

After finishing the last two seasons at 6–10, the bottom completely fell out in 1999. After they won their opener, the Saints proceeded to lose their next seven games, one of which was to the reactivated Cleveland Browns on a hail mary as time expired. This resulted in the Browns first win since their reactivation. After this the Saints never recovered and ended the season 3–13, tying their worst record since the infamous 1980 1–15 season and the worst record of Coach Ditka's career. The Saints failed to win a road game during the season, the first time since 1975 that they failed to win a game away from the Superdome.

With their loss to the Browns, the Saints became the only team since the NFL/AFL merger in 1970 to lose to the last winless team in successive seasons.

== Offseason ==
=== NFL draft ===
With the only pick in the draft the New Orleans Saints selected running back Ricky Williams out of the University of Texas with the fifth overall pick. The Saints traded all of their draft picks in the 1999 draft in order to move up so they could draft Williams, as well as a first round pick in the 2000 NFL draft that eventually was used by the Washington Redskins to draft LaVar Arrington. The move was heavily criticized by fans and the media, especially after a magazine cover in New Orleans posted a front cover picture of Ditka and Williams, with the latter shown in a wedding dress.

1999 New Orleans Saints draft
Round	Pick	Player	Position	College	Notes
1	5	Ricky Williams *	RB	Texas	from Carolina via Washington
Made roster * Made at least one Pro Bowl during career

== Personnel ==
=== Staff ===
1999 New Orleans Saints staff
Front office: Owner – Tom Benson; President/general manager/chief operating officer – Bill Kuharich; Vice president of football operations/assistant general manager – Charles Bailey; Director of college scouting – Bruce Lemmerman; Head coaches: Head coach – Mike Ditka; Assistant head coach/linebackers – Rick Venturi; Offensive coaches: Offensive coordinator – Danny Abramowicz; Quarterbacks – Tom Clements; Running backs – Lary Kuharich; Wide receivers – Harold Jackson; Tight ends/offensive line assistant – Dan Neal; Offensive line – Bill Meyers; Offensive assistant – Judd Garrett; Offensive assistant/tight ends – Rodney Holman	Defensive coaches: Defensive coordinator – Zaven Yaralian; Defensive line – Walt Corey; Defensive backs – Carlos Mainord; Defensive assistant/pass rush – Rickey Jackson; Defensive assistant/linebackers – Ned James; Special teams coaches: Special teams – Bobby April; Strength and conditioning: Strength and conditioning – Mike Woicik; Assistant strength and conditioning – Markus Paul

=== Roster ===
1999 New Orleans Saints roster
Quarterbacks (QB): 9 Jake Delhomme; 12 Billy Joe Hobert; 11 Billy Joe Tolliver; 7 Danny Wuerffel; Running backs (RB): 32 Aaron Craver FB; 28 Troy Davis KR; 33 Wilmont Perry; 37 Dino Philyaw KR; 40 Marvin Powell FB; 26 Lamar Smith; 34 Ricky Williams; Wide receivers (WR): 81 Lawrence Dawsey; 80 P. J. Franklin; 88 Andre Hastings; 82 Eddie Kennison PR; 83 Keith Poole; Tight ends (TE): 85 Cam Cleeland; 47 Josh Wilcox	Offensive linemen (OL): 69 Tom Ackerman C/G; 62 Jerry Fontenot C; 79 Mike Halapin G; 60 Robert Hunt G; 65 Chris Naeole G; 77 Willie Roaf T; 78 Daryl Terrell T; 68 Kyle Turley T; Defensive linemen (DL): 97 La'Roi Glover DT; 96 Uhuru Hamiter DE/DT; 93 Wayne Martin DE/DT; 64 Robert Newkirk DT; 95 Austin Robbins DT; 91 Brady Smith DE; 98 Willie Whitehead DE/DT; 92 Troy Wilson DE	Linebackers (LB): 56 Chris Bordano MLB; 51 Phil Clarke MLB; 55 Mark Fields OLB; 59 Keith Mitchell OLB; 50 Kevin Mitchell MLB; 58 Joe Tuipala OLB; Defensive backs (DB): 43 Ashley Ambrose CB; 30 Je'Rod Cherry SS; 42 Willie Clay FS; 22 Tyronne Drakeford CB; 36 Corey Harris CB; 44 Rob Kelly FS; 29 Sammy Knight SS; 25 Alex Molden CB; 24 Fred Weary CB; 21 Robert Williams CB; Special teams (ST): 6 Tommy Barnhardt P; 10 Doug Brien K; 86 Kendall Gammon C	Practice squad: 48 Cuncho Brown TE; 67 Tom Schau T; 16 L.C. Stevens WR; Reserve: 54 Ink Aleaga LB (IR); 89 Brett Bech WR (IR); 61 Justin Burroughs C (IR); 87 John Farquhar TE (IR); 23 Chris Hewitt S (IR); 94 Joe Johnson DE (IR); 73 Bryan LaBelle T (IR); -- Marc Lillibridge LB (IR); 84 Scott Slutzker TE (IR); 52 Vinson Smith LB (IR); 53 Donnie Spragan LB (IR); 90 Jared Tomich DE (IR); 63 Wally Williams G (IR); Rookies in italics 53 active, 13 reserve, 3 practice squad

== Regular season ==
=== Schedule ===
Week	Date	Opponent	Result	Record	Venue	Attendance
1	September 12	**Carolina Panthers**	**W** 19–10	1–0	Louisiana Superdome	58,166
2	September 19	at **San Francisco 49ers**	**L** 21–28	1–1	3Com Park	67,685
3	Bye					
4	October 3	at Chicago Bears	**L** 10–14	1–2	Soldier Field	66,944
5	October 10	**Atlanta Falcons**	**L** 17–20	1–3	Louisiana Superdome	57,289
6	October 17	Tennessee Titans	**L** 21–24	1–4	Louisiana Superdome	51,875
7	October 24	at New York Giants	**L** 3–31	1–5	Giants Stadium	77,982
8	October 31	Cleveland Browns	**L** 16–21	1–6	Louisiana Superdome	48,817
9	November 7	Tampa Bay Buccaneers	**L** 16–31	1–7	Louisiana Superdome	47,129
10	November 14	**San Francisco 49ers**	**W** 24–6	2–7	Louisiana Superdome	52,198
11	November 21	at Jacksonville Jaguars	**L** 23–41	2–8	Alltel Stadium	69,772
12	November 28	at **St. Louis Rams**	**L** 12–43	2–9	Trans World Dome	65,864
13	December 5	at **Atlanta Falcons**	**L** 12–35	2–10	Georgia Dome	62,568
14	December 12	**St. Louis Rams**	**L** 14–30	2–11	Louisiana Superdome	46,838
15	December 19	at Baltimore Ravens	**L** 8–31	2–12	PSINet Stadium	67,597
16	December 24	Dallas Cowboys	**W** 31–24	3–12	Louisiana Superdome	47,835
17	January 2, 2000	at **Carolina Panthers**	**L** 13–45	3–13	Ericcson Stadium	56,929
Note: Intra-division opponents are in **bold** text.

=== Game summaries ===
==== Week 1: vs. Carolina Panthers ====
Week 1: Carolina Panthers at New Orleans Saints – Game summary

Quarter	1	2	3	4	Total
Panthers	0	10	0	0	**10**
**Saints**	7	3	9	0	**19**

at Louisiana Superdome, New Orleans, Louisiana

- Date: September 12
- Game time: 12:00 p.m. CDT
- Game weather: None (indoor stadium)
- Game attendance: 58,166
- Referee: Larry Nemmers
- TV announcers (FOX): Ray Bentley, Ron Pitts, Jim Gallagher
- Box score

Game information

**First quarter**

- NO – Tyronne Drakeford 14-yard fumble return (Doug Brien kick), 14:48. Saints 7–0.

**Second quarter**

- NO – Doug Brien 46-yard field goal, 12:52. Saints 10–0. **Drive: 7 plays, 34 yards, 2:59.**
- CAR – Wesley Walls 5-yard pass from Steve Beuerlein (John Kasay kick), 9:22. Saints 10–7. **Drive: 6 plays, 69 yards, 3:30.**
- CAR – John Kasay 52-yard field goal, 1:39. Tied 10–10. **Drive: 5 plays, 13 yards, 0:35.**

**Third quarter**

- NO – Doug Brien 21-yard field goal, 6:14. Saints 13–10. **Drive: 6 plays, 17 yards, 2:13.**
- NO – Keith Poole 67-yard pass from Billy Joe Hobert (pass failed), 5:03. Saints 19–10. **Drive: 2 plays, 68 yards, 0:49.**

**Fourth quarter**

- No scoring plays

**Top passers**

- CAR – Steve Beuerlein – 16/32, 207 yards, TD, INT
- NO – Billy Joe Hobert – 11/22, 132 yards, TD

**Top rushers**

- CAR – Tim Biakabutuka – 8 rushes, 45 yards
- NO – Lamar Smith – 13 rushes, 66 yards

**Top receivers**

- CAR – Muhsin Muhammad – 4 receptions, 64 yards
- NO – Keith Poole – 3 receptions, 89 yards, TD

With the win, the Saints started 1–0 for the second season in a row. However, this would be New Orleans' last win for two months.

==== Week 2: at San Francisco 49ers ====
Week 2: New Orleans Saints at San Francisco 49ers – Game summary

Quarter	1	2	3	4	Total
Saints	0	14	7	0	**21**
**49ers**	7	7	0	14	**28**

at 3Com Park, San Francisco, California

- Date: September 19
- Game time: 3:05 p.m. CDT/1:05 p.m. PDT
- Game weather: Partly cloudy, 70 °F (21.1 °C)
- Game attendance: 67,685
- Referee: Phil Luckett
- TV announcers (FOX): Kenny Albert, Tim Green, Jamie Williams
- Box score

Game information

**First quarter**

- SF – Terrell Owens 5-yard pass from Steve Young (Wade Richey kick), 6:08. 49ers 7–0. **Drive: 6 plays, 39 yards, 2:54.**

**Second quarter**

- NO – Eddie Kennison 2-yard pass from Billy Joe Hobert (Doug Brien kick), 13:29. Tied 7–7. **Drive: 15 plays, 67 yards, 7:39.**
- NO – Keith Poole 58-yard pass from Billy Joe Hobert (Doug Brien kick), 9:54. Saints 14–7. **Drive: 3 plays, 61 yards, 0:57.**
- SF – Tommy Vardell 1-yard run (Wade Richey kick), 5:59. Tied 14–14. **Drive: 7 plays, 71 yards, 3:55.**

**Third quarter**

- NO – Lawrence Dawsey 12-yard pass from Billy Joe Hobert (Doug Brien kick), 9:46. Saints 21–14. **Drive: 11 plays, 79 yards, 5:14.**

**Fourth quarter**

- SF – Terell Owens 4-yard pass from Steve Young (Wade Richey kick), 2:03. Tied 21–21. **Drive: 11 plays, 62 yards, 4:50.**
- SF – Lance Schulters 64-yard interception return (Wade Richey kick), 1:31. 49ers 28–21.

**Top passers**

- NO – Billy Joe Hobert – 20/37, 223 yards, 3 TD, 2 INT
- SF – Steve Young – 23/35, 258 yards, 2 TD, INT

**Top rushers**

- NO – Ricky Williams – 22 rushes, 80 yards
- SF – Charlie Garner – 12 rushes, 72 yards

**Top receivers**

- NO – Keith Poole – 2 receptions, 69 yards, TD
- SF – Charlie Garner – 5 receptions, 88 yards

==== Week 4: at Chicago Bears ====
Week 4: New Orleans Saints at Chicago Bears – Game summary

Quarter	1	2	3	4	Total
Saints	0	7	3	0	**10**
**Bears**	0	0	0	14	**14**

at Soldier Field, Chicago, Illinois

- Date: October 3
- Game time: 12:00 p.m. CDT
- Game weather: Cloudy, 49 °F (9.4 °C)
- Game attendance: 66,944
- Referee: Ron Blum
- TV announcers (FOX): Kenny Albert, Tim Green, Dan Jiggetts
- Box score

Game information

**First quarter**

- No scoring plays

**Second quarter**

- NO – Billy Joe Hobert 2-yard run (Doug Brien kick), 4:32. Saints 7–0. **Drive: 12 plays, 62 yards, 5:25.**

**Third quarter**

- NO – Doug Brien 30-yard field goal, 3:23. Saints 10–0. **Drive: 5 plays, 27 yards, 2:18.**

**Fourth quarter**

- CHI – Curtis Conway 22-yard pass from Shane Matthews (Jeff Jaeger kick), 1:48. Saints 10–7. **Drive: 10 plays, 79 yards, 2:47.**
- CHI – Curtis Conway 6-yard pass from Shane Matthews (Jeff Jaeger kick), 0:07. Bears 14–10. **Drive: 6 plays, 67 yards, 1:01.**

**Top passers**

- NO – Billy Joe Tolliver – 7/15, 102 yards
- CHI – Shane Matthews – 25/39, 224 yards, 2 TD, 2 INT

**Top rushers**

- NO – Ricky Williams – 21 rushes, 84 yards
- CHI – Curtis Enis – 23 rushes, 83 yards

**Top receivers**

- NO – Eddie Kennison – 4 receptions, 55 yards
- CHI – Curtis Conway – 8 receptions, 103 yards, 2 TD

The Saints had a 10–0 lead with just under 2 minutes left to play, but saw the lead quickly fade away. The Bears scored their first points of the game with 1:48 left in the 4th on a 22-yard pass from Shane Matthews to wide receiver Curtis Conway. Chicago would recover the onside kick and go down the field in 61 seconds to win 14–10 after scoring the game-winning touchdown with just 6 seconds left to play.

==== Week 5: vs. Atlanta Falcons ====
Week 5: Atlanta Falcons at New Orleans Saints – Game summary

Quarter	1	2	3	4	Total
**Falcons**	7	0	7	6	**20**
Saints	0	17	0	0	**17**

at Louisiana Superdome, New Orleans, Louisiana

- Date: October 10
- Game time: 12:00 p.m. CDT
- Game weather: None (played indoors)
- Game attendance: 57,289
- Referee: Johnny Grier
- Box score

Game information

**First quarter**

- ATL – Terance Mathis 22-yard pass from Tony Graziani (Morten Andersen kick), 8:17. Falcons 7–0. **Drive: 11 plays, 76 yards, 6:43.**

**Second quarter**

- NO – Doug Brien 42-yard field goal, 13:12. Falcons 7–3. **Drive: 4 plays, -4 yards, 1:38.**
- NO – Eddie Kennison 90-yard pass from Billy Joe Hobert (Doug Brien kick), 9:47. Saints 10–7. **Drive: 1 play, 90 yards, 0:13.**
- NO – Brett Bech 23-yard pass from Billy Joe Tolliver (Doug Brien kick), 0:46. Saints 17–7. **Drive: 9 plays, 81 yards, 1:02.**

**Third quarter**

- ATL – Bob Christian 1-yard run (Morten Andersen kick), 10:59. Saints 17–14. **Drive: 5 plays, 72 yards, 2:18.**

**Fourth quarter**

- ATL – Morten Andersen 36-yard field goal, 14:17. Tied 17–17. **Drive: 9 plays, 13 yards, 3:32.**
- ATL – Morten Andersen 44-yard field goal, 8:29. Falcons 20–17. **Drive: 8 plays, 22 yards, 4:05.**

**Top passers**

- ATL – Tony Graziani – 11/20, 162 yards, TD
- NO – Billy Joe Tolliver – 13/26, 185 yards, TD, 2 INT

**Top rushers**

- ATL – Ken Oxendine – 20 rushes, 57 yards
- NO – Ricky Williams – 19 rushes, 53 yards

**Top receivers**

- ATL – Terance Mathis – 5 receptions, 67 yards, TD
- NO – Eddie Kennison – 4 receptions, 138 yards, TD

==== Week 6: vs. Tennessee Titans ====
Week 6: Tennessee Titans at New Orleans Saints – Game summary

Quarter	1	2	3	4	Total
**Titans**	0	0	7	17	**24**
Saints	3	7	3	8	**21**

at Louisiana Superdome, New Orleans, Louisiana

- Date: October 17
- Game time: 1:00 p.m. CDT
- Game weather: None (indoor stadium)
- Game attendance: 51,875
- Referee: Bernie Kukar
- TV announcers (CBS): Bill Macatee, Beasley Reece, Marcus Allen

==== Week 7: at New York Giants ====
Week 7: New Orleans Saints at New York Giants – Game summary

Quarter	1	2	3	4	Total
Saints	3	0	0	0	**3**
**Giants**	7	17	7	0	**31**

at Giants Stadium, East Rutherford, New Jersey

- Date: October 24
- Game time: 12:00 p.m. CDT/1:00 p.m. EDT
- Game weather: Mostly cloudy, 54 °F (12.2 °C)
- Game attendance: 77,982
- Referee: Phil Luckett
- TV announcers (Fox): Sam Rosen, Bill Maas, and Jim Gallagher

With their 5th straight loss, the Saints fell to 1–5. This would be the last time the Saints started with a 1–5 record until 2025.

==== Week 8: vs. Cleveland Browns ====
Week 8: Cleveland Browns at New Orleans Saints – Game summary

Quarter	1	2	3	4	Total
**Browns**	0	7	7	7	**21**
Saints	7	3	3	3	**16**

at Louisiana Superdome, New Orleans, Louisiana

- Date: October 31
- Game time: 12:00 p.m. CDT
- Game weather: None (indoor stadium)
- Game attendance: 48,817
- Referee: Mike Carey
- TV announcers (CBS): Don Criqui, Steve Tasker, Marcus Allen
- Box score

Game information

**First quarter**

- NO – Keith Poole 5-yard pass from Billy Joe Hobert (Doug Brien kick), 3:59. Saints 7–0. **Drive: 4 plays, 15 yards, 2:08.**

**Second quarter**

- CLE – Marc Edwards 27-yard pass from Tim Couch (Phil Dawson kick), 7:37. Tied 7–7. **Drive: 1 play, 22 yards, 0:06.**
- NO – Doug Brien 49-yard field goal, 0:08. Saints 10–7. **Drive: 9 plays, 42 yards, 0:58.**

**Third quarter**

- CLE – Kevin Johnson 24-yard pass from Tim Couch (Phil Dawson kick), 8:53. Browns 14–10. **Drive: 2 plays, 22 yards, 0:44.**
- NO – Doug Brien 22-yard field goal, 1:15. Browns 14–13. **Drive: 13 plays, 56 yards, 7:38.**

**Fourth quarter**

- NO – Doug Brien 46-yard field goal, 0:21. Saints 16–14. **Drive: 8 plays, 35 yards, 3:20.**
- CLE – Kevin Johnson 56-yard pass from Tim Couch (Phil Dawson kick), 0:00. Browns 21–16. **Drive: 3 plays, 75 yards, 0:21.**

**Top passers**

- CLE – Tim Couch – 11/19, 193 yards, 3 TD
- NO – Billy Joe Tolliver – 9/20, 92 yards, INT

**Top rushers**

- CLE – Karim Abdul-Jabbar – 13 rushes, 39 yards
- NO – Ricky Williams – 40 rushes, 179 yards

**Top receivers**

- CLE – Kevin Johnson – 4 receptions, 96 yards, 2 TD
- NO – Aaron Craver – 2 receptions, 32 yards

For week 8, the 1–5 Saints hosted the 0–7 Browns, who were playing in their first season since 1995 following a relocation controversy that saw the franchise officially being deactivated for three seasons.

The Saints would take a 16–14 lead with 0:21 left in the game. On the final play of the game, Cleveland quarterback Tim Couch heaved a Hail Mary pass into the end zone that was tipped by several New Orleans defenders before being caught by Browns wide receiver Kevin Johnson as the clock struck 0:00, giving Cleveland its first win since December 17, 1995.

The Saints' offense finished the game with 351 yards of total offense and controlled the ball for 40:50, while the Browns' offense only had 243 total yards and a possession time of 19:10. However, New Orleans committed five turnovers, two of which gave Cleveland a short field that resulted in touchdowns for the Browns.

With the loss, the Saints fell to 1–7 and their losing streak was extended to six games. Additionally, the Saints became the first team to lose to the expansion Browns and lost to the last winless team in the NFL, having lost to the 0–7 Carolina Panthers during week 9 of the previous season. This also marked the second time an expansion franchise got its first win over New Orleans, as the Tampa Bay Buccaneers, who started 0–26, got its first win as a franchise by defeating the Saints 33–14 during the 1977 season.

==== Week 9: vs. Tampa Bay Buccaneers ====
Week 9: Tampa Bay Buccaneers at New Orleans Saints – Game summary

Quarter	1	2	3	4	Total
**Buccaneers**	7	10	7	7	**31**
Saints	3	3	0	10	**16**

at Louisiana Superdome, New Orleans, Louisiana

- Date: November 7
- Game time: 3:05 p.m. CST
- Game weather: None (indoor stadium)
- Game attendance: 47,129
- Referee: Ed Hochuli
- TV announcers (FOX): Sam Rosen, Bill Maas

==== Week 10: vs. San Francisco 49ers ====
Week 10: San Francisco 49ers at New Orleans Saints – Game summary

Quarter	1	2	3	4	Total
49ers	3	3	0	0	**6**
**Saints**	7	7	7	3	**24**

at Louisiana Superdome, New Orleans, Louisiana

- Date: November 14
- Game time: 12:00 p.m. CST
- Game weather: None (indoor stadium)
- Game attendance: 52,198
- Referee: Larry Nemmers
- TV announcers (FOX): Kenny Albert, Tim Green

With the win, the Saints improved to 2–7 and snapped a seven game losing streak that had lasted for just over two months.

==== Week 11: at Jacksonville Jaguars ====
Week 11: New Orleans Saints at Jacksonville Jaguars – Game summary

Quarter	1	2	3	4	Total
Saints	7	10	0	6	**23**
**Jaguars**	14	3	14	10	**41**

at Alltel Stadium, Jacksonville, Florida

- Date: November 21
- Game time: 7:20 p.m. CST/8:20 p.m. EST
- Game weather: Clear, 62 °F (16.7 °C)
- Game attendance: 69,772
- Referee: Tom White
- TV announcers (ESPN): Mike Patrick, Joe Theismann, and Solomon Wilcots

==== Week 12: at St. Louis Rams ====
Week 12: New Orleans Saints at St. Louis Rams – Game summary

Quarter	1	2	3	4	Total
Saints	3	9	0	0	**12**
**Rams**	7	8	7	21	**43**

at Trans World Dome, St. Louis, Missouri

- Date: November 28
- Game time: 12:00 p.m. CST
- Game weather: None (indoor stadium)
- Game attendance: 65,864
- Referee: Bill Carollo
- TV announcers (Fox): Sam Rosen, Bill Maas, and Pete Peterson

==== Week 13: at Atlanta Falcons ====
Week 13: New Orleans Saints at Atlanta Falcons – Game summary

Quarter	1	2	3	4	Total
Saints	3	3	0	6	**12**
**Falcons**	7	14	14	0	**35**

at Georgia Dome, Atlanta, Georgia

- Date: December 5
- Game time: 12:00 p.m. CST/1:00 p.m. EST
- Game weather: None (indoor stadium)
- Game attendance: 62,568
- Referee: Ron Winter
- TV announcers (FOX): Curt Menefee, Brian Baldinger

With the loss, the Saints were swept by the Falcons and mathematically eliminated from playoff contention at 2–10.

==== Week 14: vs. St. Louis Rams ====
Week 14: St. Louis Rams at New Orleans Saints – Game summary

Quarter	1	2	3	4	Total
**Rams**	7	17	3	3	**30**
Saints	6	8	0	0	**14**

at Louisiana Superdome, New Orleans, Louisiana

- Date: December 12
- Game time: 12:00 p.m. CST
- Game weather: None (indoor stadium)
- Game attendance: 46,838
- Referee: Bob McElwee
- TV announcers (Fox): Thom Brennaman, Jeff Lageman, and Jim Gallagher

==== Week 15: at Baltimore Ravens ====
Week 15: New Orleans Saints at Baltimore Ravens – Game summary

Quarter	1	2	3	4	Total
Saints	0	0	0	8	**8**
**Ravens**	3	14	0	14	**31**

at PSINet Stadium, Baltimore, Maryland

- Date: December 19
- Game time: 12:00 p.m. CST/1:00 p.m. EST
- Game weather: Sunny, 43 °F (6.1 °C)
- Game attendance: 67,597
- Referee: Dick Hantak
- TV announcers (FOX): Scott Graham, Dave Lapham

==== Week 16: vs. Dallas Cowboys ====
Week 16: Dallas Cowboys at New Orleans Saints – Game summary

Quarter	1	2	3	4	Total
Cowboys	0	7	17	0	**24**
**Saints**	10	0	7	14	**31**

at Louisiana Superdome, New Orleans, Louisiana

- Date: December 24
- Game time: 2:00 p.m. CST
- Game weather: None (indoor stadium)
- Game attendance: 47,835
- Referee: Ed Hochuli
- TV announcers (FOX): Pat Summerall, John Madden, D.J. Johnson

==== Week 17: at Carolina Panthers ====
Week 17: New Orleans Saints at Carolina Panthers – Game summary

Quarter	1	2	3	4	Total
Saints	0	0	0	13	**13**
**Panthers**	10	7	14	14	**45**

at Ericcson Stadium, Charlotte, North Carolina

- Date: January 2, 2000
- Game time: 12:00 p.m. CST/1:00 p.m. EST
- Game weather: Cloudy, 61 °F (16.1 °C)
- Game attendance: 56,929
- Referee: Gerry Austin
- TV announcers (FOX): Curt Menefee, Brian Baldinger

=== Standings ===
NFC West
	W	L	T	PCT	PF	PA	STK
^{(1)} St. Louis Rams	13	3	0	.813	526	242	L1
Carolina Panthers	8	8	0	.500	421	381	W1
Atlanta Falcons	5	11	0	.313	285	380	W2
San Francisco 49ers	4	12	0	.250	295	453	L3
New Orleans Saints	3	13	0	.188	260	434	L1

== Statistics ==
=== Passing ===
Player	G	QB Rat.	Comp.	Att.	Pct.	Yards	Yards/Att.	TD	INT
Billy Joe Hobert	9	68.9	85	159	53.5	970	6.1	6	6
Billy Joe Tolliver	10	58.9	139	268	51.9	1916	7.1	7	16
Jake Delhomme	2	62.4	42	76	55.3	521	6.9	3	5
Danny Wuerffel	4	30.8	22	48	45.8	191	4.0	0	3

=== Rushing ===
Player	G	Att.	Yards	Yards/Att.	TD
Ricky Williams	12	253	884	3.5	2
Lamar Smith	13	60	205	3.4	0
Wilmont Perry	7	48	180	3.8	0
Troy Davis	16	20	32	1.6	0
Aaron Craver	13	17	40	2.4	0

=== Receiving ===
Player	G	Rec	Yards	Yards/Rec	TD
Eddie Kennison	16	61	835	13.7	4
Keith Poole	15	42	796	19.0	6
Andre Hastings	15	40	564	14.1	1
Ricky Williams	12	28	172	6.1	0
Cameron Cleeland	11	26	325	12.5	1
Lamar Smith	13	20	151	7.6	1
Aaron Craver	13	19	154	8.1	0
Lawrence Dawsey	10	16	196	12.3	1
Scott Slutzker	11	11	164	14.9	1
Troy Davis	16	7	53	7.6	0
Josh Wilcox	8	6	61	10.2	0
Brett Bech	8	4	65	16.3	1
Wilmont Perry	7	4	26	6.5	0
Dino Philyaw	13	2	23	11.5	0
P. J. Franklin	3	2	13	6.5	0

=== Kick Returns ===
Player	G	Returns	Yards	Yards/Return	TD
Dino Philyaw	13	53	1165	22.0	0
Troy Davis	16	20	424	21.2	0
Wilmont Perry	7	2	6	3.0	0
Lawrence Dawsey	10	1	20	20.0	0
Brett Bech	8	1	12	12.0	0
Kendall Gammon	16	1	9	9.0	0
Aaron Craver	13	1	3	3.0	0

=== Punt Returns ===
Player	G	Returns	Yards	Yards/Return	TD
Eddie Kennison	16	35	258	7.4	0

=== Punting ===
Player	G	Punts	Yards	Yards/Punt	Punts Blocked
Tommy Barnhardt	16	82	3262	39.8	0

=== Kicking ===
Player	G	Extra points Att.	Extra points Made	Extra Point Pct.	Field goals Att.	Field goals made	Field Goal Pct.	Total points scored
Doug Brien	16	20	21	95	24	29	82.8	92

=== Interceptions ===
Player	G	Int	Yards	TD
Ashley Ambrose	16	6	27	0
Willie Clay	16	3	32	0
Keith Mitchell	16	3	22	0
Fred Weary	16	2	49	0
Mark Fields	14	2	0	0
Rob Kelly	16	1	6	0
Alex Molden	13	1	2	0
Sammy Knight	16	1	0	0

=== Sacks ===
Player	G	Sacks
La'Roi Glover	16	8.5
Willie Whitehead	16	7.0
Brady Smith	16	6.0
Troy Wilson	16	5.5
Wayne Martin	16	4.5
Mark Fields	14	4.0
Keith Mitchell	16	3.5
Jared Tomich	8	3.0
Austin Robbins	14	2.0
Chris Hewitt	12	1.0
