= Sammy Knight =

American football player (born 1975)

No. 29, 24, 26
- Position: Safety

Personal information
- Born: September 10, 1975 (age 51); Fontana, California, U.S.
- Listed height: 6 ft 1 in (1.85 m)
- Listed weight: 215 lb (98 kg)

Career information
- High school: Rubidoux (Riverside, California)
- College: USC (1993–1996)
- NFL draft: 1997: undrafted

Career history

Playing
- New Orleans Saints (1997–2002); Miami Dolphins (2003–2004); Kansas City Chiefs (2005–2006); Jacksonville Jaguars (2007); New York Giants (2008)

Coaching
- USC Trojans (2010–2011) Graduate assistant

Awards and highlights
- Second-team All-Pro (2001); Pro Bowl (2001); PFWA All-Rookie Team (1997); New Orleans Saints Hall of Fame; First-team All-Pac-10 (1996); Second-team All-Pac-10 (1995)

Career NFL statistics
- Tackles: 1,048
- Sacks: 9.0
- Forced fumbles: 12
- Fumble recoveries: 13
- Interceptions: 42
- Defensive touchdowns: 5
- Stats at Pro Football Reference

Sammy Dee Knight Jr. (born September 10, 1975) is an American former professional football player who was a safety in the National Football League (NFL). He played college football for the USC Trojans and was signed by the New Orleans Saints as an undrafted free agent in 1997. Knight was also a member of the Miami Dolphins, Kansas City Chiefs, Jacksonville Jaguars, and New York Giants. He was also an assistant coach for USC.

== Early life ==
Knight graduated from Rubidoux High School in Riverside, California, before attending the University of Southern California. He has three brothers who also played college football: Ryan was a record-setting prep All-American running back (rushing for 501 yards in a game) who then lettered four years (1984–87) at tailback at USC and led the Trojans in rushing in 1985 and 1986 (he is 20th on USC's career rushing list with 1,875 yards), Greg played defensive line at Colorado (1986) and Darryl lettered 3 years (1998–2000) at linebacker at USC. His father, Sam Sr., played on a California state championship basketball team at Riverside (Calif.) Community College in the early 1960s that was coached by Jerry Tarkanian. He is married to Freda Knight, a Hampton University Graduate. They have four daughters named Shianne, Samone, Savannah, and Sasha. Knight also has an older daughter named Aneka.

== Professional career ==
=== New Orleans Saints ===
==== 1997 ====
On April 25, 1997, the New Orleans Saints signed Knight to a one-year, $138,500 contract as an undrafted free agent that included an initial signing bonus of $7,500 after he went undrafted in the 1997 NFL draft.

Throughout training camp, Knight competed to be the starting strong safety against Je'Rod Cherry, Vashone Adams, and rookie Rob Kelly. Head coach Mike Ditka named Knight the backup strong safety to begin the regular season, behind starting strong safety Vashone Adams.

He made his professional regular season debut in the New Orleans Saints' 38–24 season-opening loss at the St. Louis Rams. On September 28, 1997, Knight earned his first career start and recorded 11 combined tackles and made his first career interception during a 14–9 loss at the New York Giants in Week 5. Knight made his first career interception off a pass by Giants' quarterback Dave Brown, that was originally intended for wide receiver Kevin Alexander, and returned it for a 32-yard gain in the third quarter. On September 30, 1997, the New Orleans Saints released Vashone Adams after Knight surpassed him on the depth chart and became the starting strong safety. In Week 14, Knight recorded eight combined tackles and made two interceptions in the Saints' 16–13 win at the Carolina Panthers. Knight made two interceptions off pass attempts by Kerry Collins and Steve Beuerlein during the game. Knight finished his rookie season in 1997 with 84 combined tackles and five interceptions in 16 games and 12 starts.

==== 1998 ====
On February 18, 1998, the New Orleans Saints offered Knight a one–year, $198,000 restricted free agent contract tender to remain with the team. Knight became the starting free safety after Anthony Newman departed in free agency. Head coach Mike Ditka named Knight the starter to begin the season, alongside strong safety Chad Cota. Knight was inactive for two games (Weeks 4–5) due to an injury. On November 8, 1998, Knight made three tackles, two interceptions, and scored his first career touchdown during a 31–24 loss at the Minnesota Vikings in Week 10. Knight intercepted a pass by Vikings' quarterback Brad Johnson and returned in for a 91-yard touchdown in the fourth quarter. In Week 16, he collected a season-high ten combined tackles and returned an interception for a touchdown in the Saints 19–17 loss at the Arizona Cardinals. Knight intercepted a pass by Cardinals' quarterback Jake Plummer, that was intended for wide receiver Frank Sanders, and returned it for a 32-yard touchdown in the first quarter. Knight finished the 1998 NFL season with 75 combined tackles and a career-high six interceptions in 14 games and 14 starts. His six interceptions tied for eighth most in the league in 1998.

==== 1999 ====
On March 23, 1999, the New Orleans Saints signed Knight to a five–year, $10 million contract with a signing bonus of $2 million. Knight was named the starting strong safety and began the season alongside free safety Rob Kelly and cornerbacks Ashley Ambrose and Fred Weary. In Week 6, he collected a season-high ten combined tackles during a 24–21 loss to the Tennessee Titans. He started all 16 games for the first time in his career in 1999 and recorded 101 combined tackles and an interception.

==== 2000 ====
On January 5, 2000, the New Orleans Saints fired head coach Mike Ditka after they finished the 1999 season with a 3–13 record. On February 3, 2000, the New Orleans Saints hired Pittsburgh Steelers' defensive coordinator Jim Haslett as their new head coach. Defensive coordinator Ron Zook retained Knight as the starting strong safety. Knight started alongside starting free safety Darren Perry in 2000.

He started in the New Orleans Saints' season-opener against the Detroit Lions and collected a season-high ten combined tackles and returned an interception for a touchdown in their 14–10 loss. Knight intercepted a pass by Lions quarterback Stoney Case, that was originally intended for tight end David Sloan, and returned it for a 37-yard touchdown in the first quarter. On November 3, 2000, Knight made four combined tackles, forced a fumble, and made his first career sack in the Saints' 20–10 win against the Carolina Panthers in Week 11. Knight had a strip/sack on Panthers' quarterback Steve Beuerlein and it was recovered and returned for a 90-yard touchdown by teammate Keith Mitchell in the third quarter. In Week 16, he recorded seven combined tackles and returned an interception for a touchdown as the Saints defeated the Atlanta Falcons 23–7. Knight intercepted a pass by Falcons'quarterback Doug Johnson and returned it for a 31-yard touchdown in the second quarter. Knight started in all 16 games in 2000 and recorded 100 combined tackles, five interceptions, two sacks, two touchdowns.

The New Orleans Saints finished first in the NFC West with a 10–6 record and earned a playoff berth. On December 30, 2000, Knight started in his first career playoff game and recorded five combined tackles and made two interceptions during the Saints' 31–28 win against the St. Louis Rams in the NFC Wildcard Game. Knight intercepted two pass attempts by Rams' quarterback Kurt Warner. The following week, he made four combined tackles as the Saints lost 34–16 at the Minnesota Vikings in the NFC Divisional Round.

==== 2001 ====
Knight returned as the starting strong safety in 2001 and started alongside free safety Jay Bellamy and cornerbacks Kevin Mathis and Fred Thomas. He started in the New Orleans Saints' season-opener at the Buffalo Bills and recorded three combined tackles, deflected three passes, and made a career-high three interceptions in their 24–6 victory. Knight made three interceptions off pass attempts by Bills' quarterback Rob Johnson. On October 28, 2001, Knight made eight combined tackles, broke up two passes, made a sack, and intercepted two passes by quarterback Kurt Warner during a 34–31 victory at the St. Louis Rams in Week 7. In Week 15, he collected a career-high 17 combined tackles (12 solo) and deflected a pass in the Saints' 43–21 loss at the Tampa Bay Buccaneers. He started in a 16 games in 2001 and recorded 96 combined tackles (78 solo), six pass deflections, four interceptions, and a sack. He was selected to the 2002 Pro Bowl and was voted second-team All-Pro in 2001.

==== 2002 ====
Head coach Jim Haslett retained Knight and Jay Bellamy as the starting safeties in 2002. In Week 3, he collected a season-high 11 combined tackles (ten solo), deflected a pass, and made an interception during a 29–23 win at the Chicago Bears. On December 29, 2002, Knight recorded nine combined tackles, broke up two passes, and made a season-high two interceptions in the Saints' 10–6 loss at the Carolina Panthers in Week 17. Knight intercepted two passes by Panthers' quarterback Rodney Peete. He started in all 16 games in 2002 and recorded a career-high 104 combined tackles (80 solo), deflected 11 passes, made five interceptions, and made two sacks.

==== 2003 ====
On February 27, 2003, Knight opted out the last year of his five-year contract and became an unrestricted free agent. Knight voided the final year after it became possible that the New Orleans Saints were going to release him. Knight was set to receive a salary of $1.92 million in 2003.

=== Miami Dolphins ===
On May 13, 2003, the Miami Dolphins signed Knight to a two-year, $2.38 million contract that includes a signing bonus of $300,000.

Throughout training camp, he competed to be the starting strong safety against Arturo Freeman. Head coach Dave Wannstedt named Knight the starting strong safety to begin the regular season, alongside free safety Brock Marion. In Week 14, he collected a season-high 13 combined tackles (11 solo) during a 12–0 loss at the New England Patriots. Knight started all 16 games in 2003 and recorded 96 combined tackles (64 solo), six pass deflections, and three interceptions.

==== 2004 ====
Head coach Dave Wannstedt retained Knight as the starting strong safety in 2004. He started alongside free safety Antuan Edwards. In Week 8, Knight collected a season-high nine combined tackles (six solo) in the Dolphins' 41–14 loss at the New York Jets. On December 20, 2004, Knight made nine combined tackles, two pass deflections, and two interceptions during a 29–28 win at home against the New England Patriots in Week 15. Knight intercepted two pass attempts by Patriots' quarterback Tom Brady. In Week 17, Knight recorded seven combined tackles and made his first career safety during a 30–23 loss at the Baltimore Ravens. Knight was credited with his first career safety during a fumble by running back Jamal Lewis in the fourth quarter. He started in all 16 games in 2004 and made 98 combined tackles (52 solo), four interceptions, and a safety.

=== Kansas City Chiefs ===
==== 2005 ====
On March 11, 2005, the Kansas City Chiefs signed Knight to a five–year, $11.12 million contract that included a signing bonus of $1.20 million. Knight reunited with former teammates Willie Roaf (Saints) and Patrick Surtain (Dolphins).

Head coach Dick Vermeil named Knight the starting strong safety to begin the regular season, alongside free safety Greg Wesley.

On October 16, 2005, Knight recorded five combined tackles, deflected a pass, and returned a fumble for a touchdown during a 28–21 victory against the Washington Redskins in Week 6. Knight recovered a fumble after teammate Carlos Hall stripped the ball from Redskins' running back Rock Cartwright. In Week 10, he collected a season-high ten combined tackles (seven solo) during a 14–3 loss at the Buffalo Bills. On November 27, 2005, Knight made six solo tackles, a season-high three pass deflections, a sack, and made his first interception as a member of the Chiefs during a 26–16 win against the New England Patriots in Week 12. Knight and Greg Wesley intercepted Patriots' quarterback Tom Brady four times during the game. On December 31, 2005, Kansas City Chiefs' head coach Dick Vermeil announced his decision to retire at the conclusion of the 2005 NFL season. Knight started in all 16 games in 2005 and recorded 89 combined tackles (70 solo), 11 pass deflections, two interceptions, two sacks, and a touchdown.

==== 2006 ====
On January 7, 2006, the Kansas City Chiefs hired Herman Edwards as their new head coach after reaching a trade agreement with his previous team, the New York Jets. Edwards opted to retain Gunther Cunningham as Defensive coordinator. Knight and Greg Wesley returned as the starting safeties in 2006. In Week 13, he collected a season-high ten solo tackles in the Chiefs' 31–28 loss at the Cleveland Browns. He started in all 16 games in 2006 and recorded 83 combined tackles (74 solo), four pass deflections, two sacks, and an interception.

==== 2007 ====
On March 22, 2007, the Kansas City Chiefs cut Knight after he declined to restructure his contract.

=== Jacksonville Jaguars ===
On August 13, 2007, the Jacksonville Jaguars signed Knight to a one–year, $860,000 contract that included an initial signing bonus of $40,000.

Head coach Jack Del Rio named Knight the starting strong safety to start the 2007 season, alongside rookie Reggie Nelson. In Week 6, he collected a season-high 12 solo tackles and made a pass deflection during the Jaguars' 37–17 win against the Houston Texans. On November 25, 2007, Knight made two solo tackles, broke up a pass, and made his last career interception off a pass by J. P. Losman during a 36–14 win against the Buffalo Bills in Week 12. He started in all 16 games in 2007 and recorded 93 combined tackles (79 solo), 11 pass deflections, and four interceptions.

The Jacksonville Jaguars finished second in the AFC South with an 11–5 record and earned a wildcard berth. On January 5, 2008, Knight recorded 13 combined tackles (ten solo) during a 31–29 victory at the Pittsburgh Steelers in the AFC Wildcard Game. The following week, the Jaguars were eliminated from the playoffs after a 31–20 loss at the New England Patriots in the AFC Divisional Round.

=== New York Giants ===
On March 3, 2008, the New York Giants signed Knight to a three-year, $5.15 million contract that includes a signing bonus of $1.25 million. Knight was signed as a replacement for Gibril Wilson who departed during free agency.

Knight entered camp slated as the starting strong safety, but saw competition from Michael Johnson. Head coach Tom Coughlin named Knight the backup strong safety to begin the regular season, behind Michael Johnson. On November 29, 2008, the New York Giants placed Knight on injured reserve due a hip injury. He finished the season with 12 combined tackles (ten solo) in nine games and no starts. On February 9, 2009, the New York Giants released Knight.

== NFL career statistics ==
Legend
**Bold**	Career high

=== Regular season ===
Year	Team	Games		Tackles				Interceptions				Fumbles			
Year	Team	GP	GS	Comb	Solo	Ast	Sck	Int	Yds	TD	Lng	FF	FR	Yds	TD
1997	NOR	16	12	84	67	17	0.0	5	75	0	39	0	1	0	0
1998	NOR	14	13	75	62	13	0.0	**6**	**171**	**2**	**91**	0	2	3	0
1999	NOR	16	16	105	76	29	0.0	1	0	0	0	0	1	0	0
2000	NOR	16	16	101	75	26	**2.0**	5	68	**2**	37	1	0	0	0
2001	NOR	16	16	98	80	18	1.0	**6**	114	0	40	**2**	**5**	0	0
2002	NOR	16	16	**107**	**82**	25	**2.0**	5	36	0	17	**2**	1	0	0
2003	MIA	16	16	98	66	32	0.0	3	98	0	70	**2**	0	0	0
2004	MIA	16	16	100	54	**46**	0.0	4	32	0	32	**2**	1	0	0
2005	KAN	16	16	91	71	20	**2.0**	2	12	0	12	**2**	2	**80**	**1**
2006	KAN	16	16	84	75	9	**2.0**	1	27	0	27	0	0	0	0
2007	JAX	16	15	93	79	14	0.0	4	31	0	15	1	0	0	0
2008	NYG	9	0	12	10	2	0.0	0	0	0	0	0	0	0	0
		183	168	1,048	797	251	9.0	42	664	4	91	12	13	83	1

=== Playoffs ===
Year	Team	Games		Tackles				Interceptions				Fumbles			
Year	Team	GP	GS	Comb	Solo	Ast	Sck	Int	Yds	TD	Lng	FF	FR	Yds	TD
2000	NOR	2	2	9	4	5	0.0	**2**	**56**	0	**52**	0	0	0	0
2006	KAN	1	1	7	6	1	0.0	0	0	0	0	0	0	0	0
2007	JAX	2	2	**20**	**14**	**6**	0.0	0	0	0	0	0	0	0	0
		5	5	36	24	12	0.0	2	56	0	52	0	0	0	0

== Coaching ==
In 2010 and 2011 Knight was part of the USC coaching staff as a graduate assistant primarily working with the safeties.
