= Kevin Mitchell (linebacker) =

American football player (1971–2007)

No. 55, 50
- Position: Linebacker

Personal information
- Born: February 1, 1971; Harrisburg, Pennsylvania, U.S.
- Died: April 30, 2007 (aged 36); Ashburn, Virginia, U.S.
- Listed height: 6 ft 1 in (1.85 m)
- Listed weight: 258 lb (117 kg)

Career information
- High school: Harrisburg (PA)
- College: Syracuse
- NFL draft: 1994: 2nd round, 53rd overall pick

Career history
- San Francisco 49ers (1994–1997); New Orleans Saints (1998–1999); Washington Redskins (2000–2003)

Awards and highlights
- Super Bowl champion (XXIX); 2× Second-team All-East (1990, 1991)

Career NFL statistics
- Tackles: 247
- Interceptions: 2
- Sacks: 6.5
- Stats at Pro Football Reference

Kevin Danyelle Mitchell (January 1, 1971 – April 30, 2007) was an American professional football linebacker in the National Football League (NFL) from Harrisburg, Pennsylvania. He played for the San Francisco 49ers, New Orleans Saints, and Washington Redskins.

== College career ==
Mitchell played college football at Syracuse University as a defensive tackle. He was the Defensive MVP of the 1993 Fiesta Bowl upset of Colorado where Mitchell had eight tackles, including six behind the line of scrimmage.

== Professional career ==
Mitchell was selected in the 1994 NFL draft by the San Francisco 49ers in the second round with the 53rd overall pick. He won Super Bowl XXIX in his rookie season with the 49ers. He played three more seasons with the 49ers. He signed with the New Orleans Saints after the 1997 NFL season. He played with the Saints for two seasons. Mitchell joined the Washington Redskins after the 1999 NFL season and played for them until after the 2003 NFL season.

Mitchell's best season came in 2001 NFL season when he recorded 82 tackles (69 solo), 2 sacks, and one forced fumble in 13 games.

In his career, he recorded 300 tackles (243 solo), 6.5 sacks, two interceptions for seven yards, four forced fumbles, one fumble recovery, and six pass deflections in 144 regular season games.

=== NFL statistics ===
Year	Team	Game	Combined tackles	Tackles	Assisted tackles	Sacks	Forced fumbles	Fumble recoveries	Fumble return yards	Interceptions	Interception return yards	Yards per interception return	Longest interception return	Interceptions returned for touchdown	Passes defended
1994	SF	16	7	6	1	0.0	0	0	0	0	0	0	0	0	0
1995	SF	15	7	4	3	0.0	0	0	0	0	0	0	0	0	1
1996	SF	12	16	15	1	1.0	1	1	0	0	0	0	0	0	1
1997	SF	16	9	4	5	0.0	0	0	0	0	0	0	0	0	0
1998	NO	8	45	23	22	2.5	2	0	0	0	0	0	0	0	1
1999	NO	16	15	14	1	0.0	0	0	0	0	0	0	0	0	1
2000	WSH	16	5	4	1	1.0	0	0	0	1	0	0	0	0	1
2001	WSH	13	81	68	13	2.0	1	0	0	0	0	0	0	0	0
2002	WSH	16	35	26	9	0.0	0	0	0	1	7	7	7	0	1
2003	WSH	16	7	6	1	0.0	0	0	0	0	0	0	0	0	0
Career		144	227	170	57	6.5	4	1	0	2	7	4	7	0	6

== Death ==
On April 30, 2007, Mitchell was found dead in his sleep in Ashburn, Virginia. According to a preliminary autopsy, he died of a massive heart attack.

Friends and family close to Mitchell said the cause of death was related to sleep apnea.
