= Eddie Kennison =

American football player (born 1973)

No. 88, 82, 85, 87, 86
- Position: Wide receiver

Personal information
- Born: January 20, 1973 (age 53); Lake Charles, Louisiana, U.S.
- Listed height: 6 ft 1 in (1.85 m)
- Listed weight: 201 lb (91 kg)

Career information
- High school: Washington-Marion (Lake Charles)
- College: LSU (1993–1995)
- NFL draft: 1996: 1st round, 18th overall pick

Career history
- St. Louis Rams (1996–1998); New Orleans Saints (1999); Chicago Bears (2000); Denver Broncos (2001); Kansas City Chiefs (2001–2007); St. Louis Rams (2008)

Awards and highlights
- PFWA All-Rookie Team (1996); Second-team All-SEC (1995)

Career NFL statistics
- Receptions: 548
- Receiving yards: 8,345
- Receiving touchdowns: 42
- Stats at Pro Football Reference

Eddie Joseph Kennison, III (born January 20, 1973) is an American former professional football player who was a wide receiver in the National Football League (NFL). He played college football for the LSU Tigers and was selected by the St. Louis Rams in the first round of the 1996 NFL draft. Kennison also played for the New Orleans Saints, Chicago Bears, Denver Broncos, and Kansas City Chiefs.

== Early life ==
Kennison attended Washington-Marion High School in Lake Charles, Louisiana, and was a star in both football and track. In football, as a senior, he was a Parade All-American despite playing only six games. He finished his senior year with 27 receptions for 497 yards (18.4 yards per reception avg.). As a junior, he hauled in 59 receptions for 1,205 yards (an average of 20.4 yards per reception) and 23 touchdowns. For his efforts, he was the first person in his school's history to have his number retired.

== College career ==
Kennison was a noted sprinter in college, where he was a six-time All-America selection. He led the LSU Tigers track and field 4x100-meter relay team to the 1994 NCAA Outdoor Championship, and also qualified for the NCAA Championships in the 4x100, 4x200, 4x400 and the 200 meters during his time at LSU.

== Professional career ==
=== Pre-draft ===
At his LSU Pro Day Kennison ran the 40-yard dash in 4.28 seconds and 4.32 seconds. He scored a 12 on the wonderlic test at the 1996 NFL Combine and measured 6-0½ and weighed 191 pounds.

=== First stint with Rams ===
Kennison was selected in the first round with the 18th overall pick by the St. Louis Rams in the 1996 NFL draft, a draft which was remarkably deep in wide receivers. On July 30, 1996, Kennison signed a four-year, $6 million deal with a $2 million signing bonus. His first season with the Rams was excellent, as he finished second to Terry Glenn in yards and receptions for rookies, and led the rookie wide receiver class in touchdowns. It was noted regularly at the time that Kennison and Glenn had outproduced number one overall pick Keyshawn Johnson. He also was selected as an alternate to the Pro Bowl. His 1997 and 1998 seasons with the Rams were far less productive, as he battled nagging injuries in a lackluster Rams offense.

=== New Orleans Saints ===
On February 18, 1999, Kennison was traded to the New Orleans Saints for a second-round draft pick in the 1999 NFL draft. Saints coach Mike Ditka said, "Our goal as coaches is to get Eddie back to the form he displayed as a rookie". In 1999 he led the team in receptions and yards. This Saints team used four different starting quarterbacks over the course of the year as they struggled to a 3–13 record.

=== Chicago Bears ===
On February 22, 2000, the Saints traded Kennison to the Chicago Bears for a fifth-round pick in the 2000 NFL draft. "(Kennison) gives us another speed guy, and that's something you can't have enough of", his new coach said. With the Bears he continued a pattern of unspectacular but reliable production. He finished second on the team to Marcus Robinson in receiving yards, and tied Robinson for the team lead in receptions. His salary for the 2000 season was $1.02 million.

=== Denver Broncos ===
On April 5, 2001, Kennison signed a two-year, $1.8 million deal with the Denver Broncos that included a $500,000 signing bonus. Kennison was on the depth chart behind starters Rod Smith and Ed McCaffrey, but an early-season injury to McCaffrey meant that Kennison was thrust into a starting role. After eight unproductive games, Kennison requested to be released from the team the night before a game in which he was scheduled to start. He stated at the time he had "lost his love for the game". Kennison's decision was reportedly due to his wife's complicated pregnancy and his father's heart attack. As a result, Kennison retired at the age of 28 and was released on November 15, 2001. The loss of Kennison, along with injuries to other Broncos receivers, decimated a once dominant Broncos corps of wide receivers.

=== Kansas City Chiefs ===
Kennison unexpectedly resurfaced less than a month later, signing with the Broncos' arch-rival Kansas City Chiefs on December 3, 2001, to the outrage of Broncos coach Mike Shanahan. Kennison's new contract was for two-years and $4.5 million with $3.2 guaranteed. Kennison would lead the Chiefs in receiving his first game as a starter.

On January 3, 2003, Kennison signed a six-year $9 million contract extension with the Chiefs. As a member of the Chiefs, from 2002 to 2006 Kennison averaged 59 receptions, 961 yards, and 5 touchdown catches during this span.

In 2007, Kennison sustained a severe hamstring injury on the first play of the regular season, and was plagued by the injury for the remainder of the season. He was released the following offseason on February 26, 2008.

=== Later career and retirement ===
Kennison was re-signed by the Rams on September 9, 2008. Kennison was released by the Rams on October 7, then signed again just hours later. He was released again on October 22.

Kennison signed a one-day ceremonial contract with the Chiefs on July 19, 2010, so he could retire as a member of the team.

In 2025, Kennison appeared on an episode of Gordon Ramsay’s Kitchen Nightmares.

== NFL career statistics ==
Year	Team	GP	GS	Rec	Yds	Avg	Lng	TD
1996	STL	15	14	54	924	17.1	77	9
1997	STL	14	9	25	404	16.2	76	0
1998	STL	16	13	17	234	13.8	45	1
1999	NO	16	16	61	835	13.7	90	4
2000	CHI	16	10	55	549	10.0	26	2
2001	DEN	8	8	15	169	11.3	65	1
2001	KC	5	5	16	322	20.1	65	0
2002	KC	16	14	53	906	17.1	64	2
2003	KC	16	16	56	853	15.2	51	5
2004	KC	14	14	62	1,086	17.5	70	8
2005	KC	16	16	68	1,102	16.2	55	5
2006	KC	16	16	53	860	16.2	51	5
2007	KC	8	8	13	101	7.8	18	0
2008	STL	3	1	0	0	0.0	0	0
Total		179	154	548	8,345	15.2	90	42
