= Mike Ditka =

American football player, coach and commentator (1939–2026)

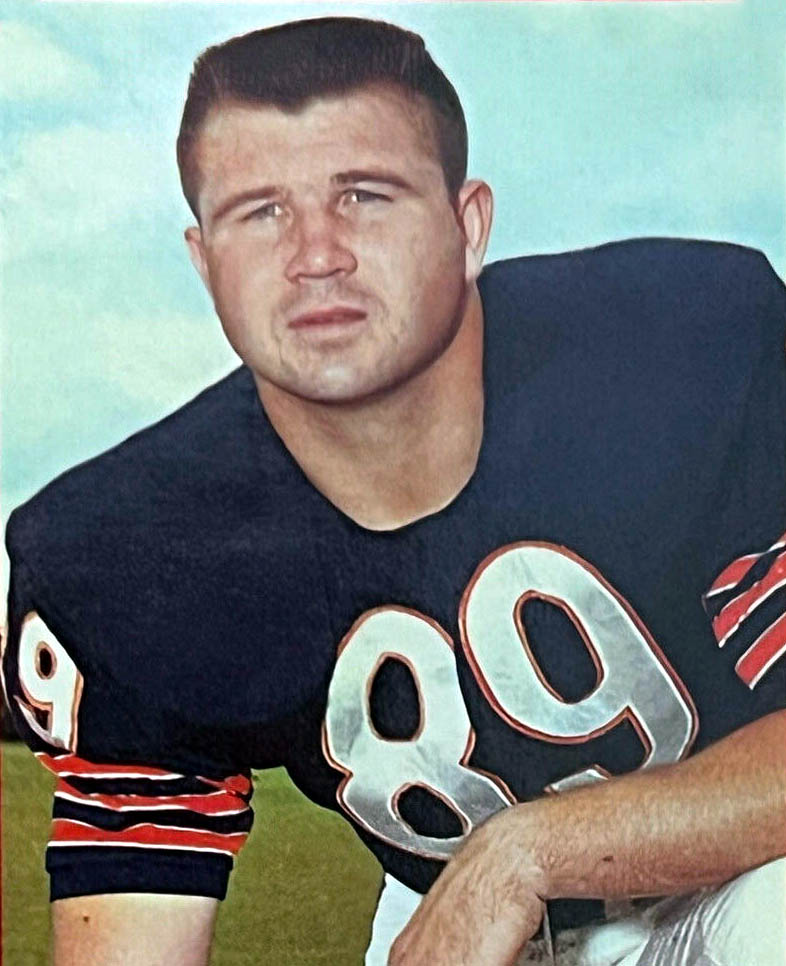
- Ditka with the Chicago Bears c. 1963

No. 89, 98
- Position: Tight end

Personal information
- Born: October 18, 1939; Carnegie, Pennsylvania, U.S.
- Died: October 9, 2026 (aged 86); Chicago, Illinois, U.S.
- Listed height: 6 ft 3 in (1.91 m)
- Listed weight: 228 lb (103 kg)

Career information
- High school: Aliquippa (Aliquippa, Pennsylvania)
- College: Pittsburgh (1958–1960)
- NFL draft: 1961: 1st round, 5th overall pick
- AFL draft: 1961: 1st round, 8th overall pick

Career history

Playing
- Chicago Bears (1961–1966); Philadelphia Eagles (1967–1968); Dallas Cowboys (1969–1972)

Coaching
- Dallas Cowboys (1973–1981) Assistant head coach & special teams coordinator; Chicago Bears (1982–1992) Head coach; New Orleans Saints (1997–1999) Head coach

Awards and highlights
- As a player: Super Bowl champion (VI); NFL champion (1963); NFL Offensive Rookie of the Year (1961); 2× First-team All-Pro (1963, 1964); 3× Second-team All-Pro (1962, 1965, 1966); 5× Pro Bowl (1961–1965); NFL 75th Anniversary All-Time Team; NFL 100th Anniversary All-Time Team; Chicago Bears No. 89 retired; 100 greatest Bears of All-Time; Unanimous All-American (1960); 2× First-team All-Eastern (1959, 1960); Pittsburgh Panthers No. 89 retired; As a coach: 2× Super Bowl champion (XII, XX); 2× AP NFL Coach of the Year (1985, 1988)

Career NFL statistics
- Receptions: 427
- Receiving yards: 5,812
- Receiving touchdowns: 43
- Stats at Pro Football Reference

Head coaching record
- Regular season: 121–95 (.560)
- Postseason: 6–6 (.500)
- Career: 127–101 (.557)
- Coaching profile at Pro Football Reference
- Pro Football Hall of Fame
- College Football Hall of Fame

Michael Keller Ditka (/ˈdɪtkə/ DIT-kə; né Dyczko; October 18, 1939 – October 9, 2026) was an American professional football player, coach, and commentator. During his playing career as a tight end, he was UPI NFL Rookie of Year in 1961, a five-time Pro Bowl selection, and a six-time All-Pro with the Chicago Bears, Philadelphia Eagles, and Dallas Cowboys in the National Football League (NFL); he was inducted into the College Football Hall of Fame in 1986 and the Pro Football Hall of Fame in 1988. Ditka was the first tight end in NFL history to reach 1,000 yards receiving in his rookie season.

Ditka was an NFL champion with the 1963 Bears and a three-time Super Bowl champion, playing on the Cowboys' Super Bowl VI team, winning as an assistant coach for the Cowboys in Super Bowl XII, and coaching the Bears to victory in Super Bowl XX. He has been named to the NFL's 75th- and 100th-Anniversary All-Time Teams.

As a head coach for the Bears from 1982 to 1992, he was twice both the AP and UPI NFL Coach of Year (1985 and 1988). He also was the head coach of the New Orleans Saints from 1997 to 1999.

Ditka and Tom Flores are the only people in NFL history to win a Super Bowl as a player, an assistant coach, and a head coach. Ditka, Flores, Gary Kubiak, and Doug Pederson are also the only people in modern NFL history to win a championship as head coach of a team for which they played previously. Ditka is the only person to participate in both of the last two Chicago Bears' league championships, as a player in 1963 and head coach in 1985.

He was known by the nickname "Iron Mike", which he said came from his being born and raised in a steel town in Pennsylvania.

== Early life ==
Ditka was born Michael Keller Dyczko, on October 18, 1939, in Carnegie, Pennsylvania, near Pittsburgh, the oldest child of Charlotte Keller and Michael Dyczko Sr. He grew up in nearby Aliquippa with siblings Ashton, David, and Mary Ann. His father, a welder, was one of three brothers of a Polish and Ukrainian family in the coal-mining and steel-manufacturing area in Western Pennsylvania. His ancestry on his mother's side was Irish and German. Others in his hometown found it hard to pronounce the name Dyczko, so the family name was changed to Ditka. Ditka attended St. Titus School.

Ditka attended Aliquippa High School, where he was a three-sport star under head coach Press Maravich. While at Aliquippa High School, the team doctor, John L. Miller, took Mike and other players to Pitt football games and encouraged them to play for Pitt. Ditka is quoted as having said, "Doc Miller patched me up many times". Ditka hoped to escape his hometown's manufacturing jobs by attending college with a football scholarship, and he initially planned to become a dentist. He was recruited by three NCAA Division I teams: Notre Dame, Penn State, and Pitt.

== College career ==
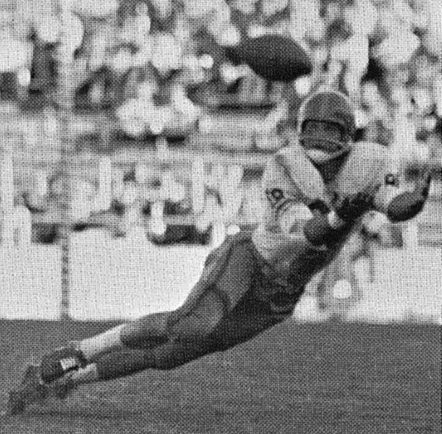
Ditka playing for Pitt in 1960

Ditka played college football for the Pitt Panthers from 1958 until 1960, and was a three-sport athlete, also playing baseball (outfielder) and basketball (forward). He was also an intramural wrestling champion at Pitt and a member of the Sigma Chi fraternity.

He started on the football team all three seasons, leading the team in receiving in each, while also serving as a linebacker, defensive end, and punter. As a sophomore, he led the team with 18 receptions for 252 yards and averaged 42.5 yards per punt. He had one touchdown reception (tied for second on the team).

As a junior, he led the team with 16 receptions for 249 yards and four receiving touchdowns. He also averaged 38.3 yards per punt.

As a senior, he was named a team captain, while leading the team with 11 receptions for 229 yards and two receiving touchdowns. He was a unanimous first-team selection on the College Football All-America Team as a two-way end and finished sixth in Heisman Trophy voting. He finished his college career with 45 catches for 730 yards and seven touchdowns.

In 1986, Ditka was inducted into the College Football Hall of Fame. On September 18, 1997, Pittsburgh retired his No. 89 jersey at halftime of a game against Miami. In 2018, he was inducted as a member of the inaugural 16-person class of the Pittsburgh Athletics Hall of Fame.

== Playing career ==
=== Chicago Bears ===
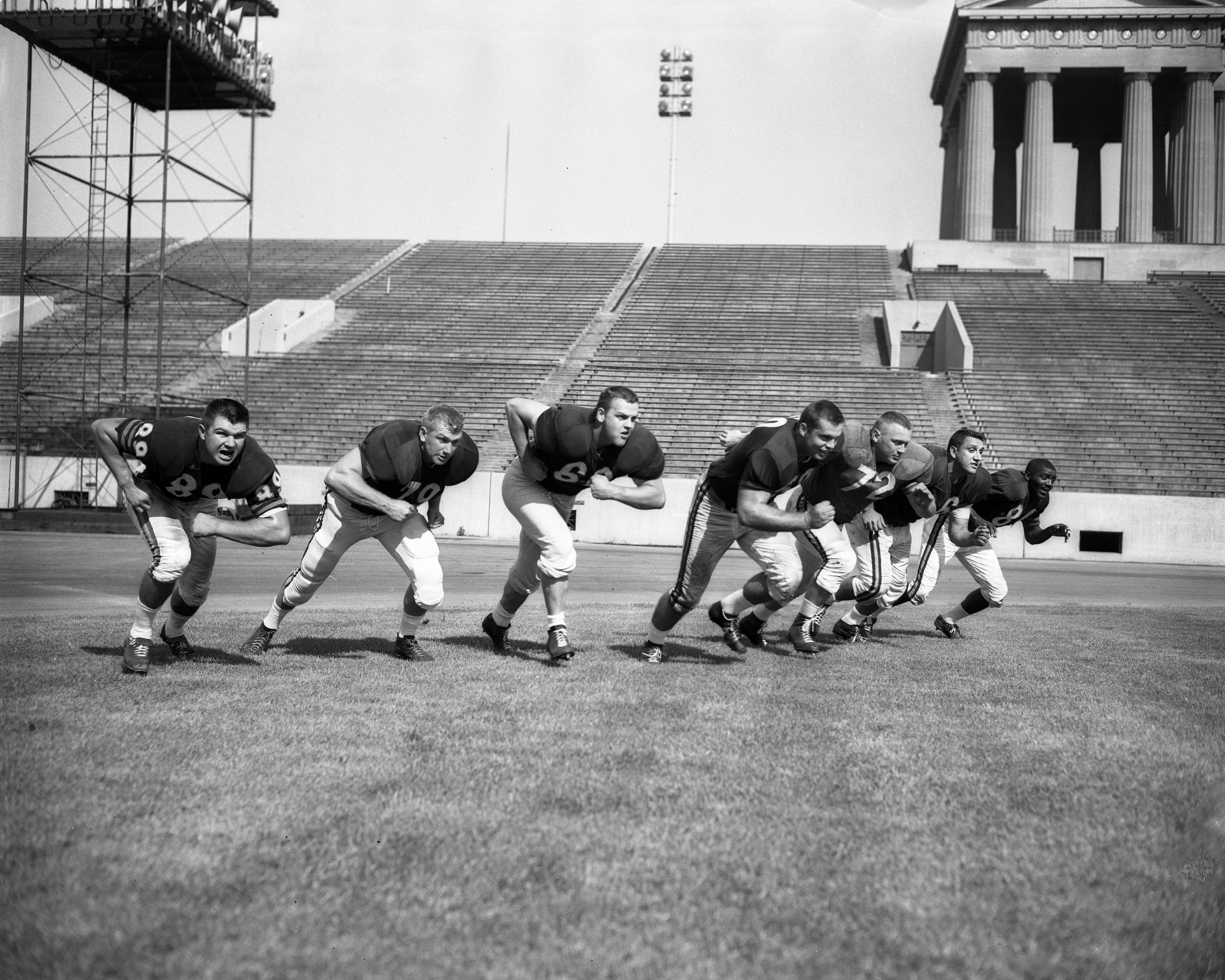
Ditka (far left) with the 1961 Chicago Bears offensive line

Ditka was selected by the Chicago Bears fifth overall in the 1961 NFL draft, while the Houston Oilers drafted him eighth overall in the first round of the 1961 AFL draft. He signed with the Bears and his presence was immediately felt. In his first season, Ditka had 56 receptions, introducing a new dimension to a tight end position that had previously been dedicated to blocking. He also scored 12 receiving touchdowns, which was the most by a Bears rookie. His success earned him Rookie of the Year honors. He continued to play for the Bears for the next five years, earning a Pro Bowl trip each season.

He played on the 1963 NFL championship team. Many of the players from that team, including Ditka, were drafted by assistant coach George Allen, a future Hall of Famer, who was then in charge of the Bears' drafts. During the season, against the Los Angeles Rams, Ditka tied Harlon Hill's franchise record for the most receiving touchdowns in a game with four. Ditka ranks first among tight ends and fourth in Bears history with 4,503 yards, fifth in both receptions (316) and touchdown catches (34).

In 1962, he started all 14 games, making 58 receptions (tied for the team lead) for 904 yards (led the team) and five receiving touchdowns (led the team).

In 1964, he was second on the team with 75 receptions for 897 yards and five touchdowns. The next year, he posted 36 receptions (second on the team), 454 receiving yards (third on the team), and two receiving touchdowns (tied for fourth on the team).

In 1966, he registered 32 receptions (second on the team), 378 yards (third on the team) and two touchdowns (tied for second on the team). Ditka was also noted for decking football fan Felix Carbajal, who had run onto the playing field late in a week 2 31–17 loss to the Rams at the Los Angeles Memorial Coliseum on September 16. He had played out his option that season after not being able to reach a contract agreement with Bears' owner/head coach George Halas.

On February 8, 1967, The New York Times reported that just before the AFL–NFL merger, Ditka had signed a $300,000 contract with a $50,000 signing bonus with the Houston Oilers, the team that owned his AFL draft rights.

=== Philadelphia Eagles ===
On April 26, 1967, Ditka was traded to the Philadelphia Eagles along with a 1968 fourth-round pick (#106-Alan Bush) in exchange for quarterback Jack Concannon. The transaction was intended to fill roster vacancies created by the retirements of Eagles' tight end Pete Retzlaff and Bears' quarterback Rudy Bukich. His Oilers contract was transferred to the Eagles and Ditka was able to keep his $50,000 bonus to avoid any legal conflicts. His time as a Bears player bitterly came to an end with a parting shot in which he stated that Halas "threw nickels around like manhole covers." He wore number 98 in his first season with the Eagles, while only playing in nine games with four starts because of injuries.

=== Dallas Cowboys ===
On January 28, 1969, he was traded to the Dallas Cowboys in exchange for wide receiver Dave McDaniels. Pettis Norman ended up being named the starting tight end, but Ditka was still able to play in 12 games with four starts, while making 17 receptions for 268 yards and three touchdowns.

In 1970, he remained a reserve player behind Norman. He appeared in 14 games, while tallying eight receptions for 98 yards and no touchdowns. The Cowboys reached their first Super Bowl, losing 16–13 against the Baltimore Colts, by way of a field goal scored with five seconds left in regulation time.

In 1971, he was a backup player behind Billy Truax, appearing in 14 games with four starts. He set the franchise record for tight ends with 30 receptions in a season, while also compiling 360 receiving yards, one touchdown, and three kickoff returns for 30 yards. His highlight was a touchdown reception in the Cowboys' 24–3 victory over the Miami Dolphins in Super Bowl VI.

In 1972, he was named the starter at tight end, after Truax was limited by off-season knee surgery. He started all 14 games, posting 17 receptions for 198 yards and one touchdown, while alternating in some passing situations with rookie Jean Fugett.

On March 1, 1973, Ditka announced his retirement as a player, opening the door for him to be named the Cowboys wide receiver assistant coach under head coach Tom Landry. At the time, his 427 receptions were the most by a tight end in NFL history.

=== Hall of Fame and other honors ===
In 1988, his blocking and 427 career receptions for 5,812 yards and 43 touchdowns earned him the honor of being the first tight end inducted into the Pro Football Hall of Fame.

In 1999, he was ranked number 90 on The Sporting News's list of the 100 Greatest Football Players. In 2019, in commemoration of the Bears' 100th season, the Chicago Tribune ranked him the 11th best player in franchise history and he was No. 6 in a list commissioned by the team.

== NFL career statistics ==
Legend
	Won the NFL championship
	Won the Super Bowl
**Bold**	Career high

=== Regular season ===
Year	Team	Games		Receiving					Rushing					Fumbles
Year	Team	GP	GS	Rec	Yds	Avg	Lng	TD	Att	Yds	Avg	Lng	TD	Fum
1961	CHI	14	14	56	**1,076**	**19.2**	**76**	**12**	0	–	–	–	–	2
1962	CHI	14	14	58	904	15.6	69	5	0	–	–	–	–	**4**
1963	CHI	14	14	59	794	13.5	63	8	0	–	–	–	–	0
1964	CHI	14	14	**75**	897	12.0	34	5	0	–	–	–	–	2
1965	CHI	14	14	36	454	12.6	44	2	0	–	–	–	–	1
1966	CHI	14	14	32	378	11.8	30	2	0	–	–	–	–	0
1967	PHI	9	6	26	274	10.5	25	2	0	–	–	–	–	0
1968	PHI	11	6	13	111	8.5	18	2	0	–	–	–	–	0
1969	DAL	12	4	17	268	15.8	51	3	0	–	–	–	–	0
1970	DAL	14	0	8	98	12.3	26	0	0	–	–	–	–	0
1971	DAL	14	4	30	360	12.0	29	1	**2**	**2**	**1.0**	**1.0**	0	0
1972	DAL	14	14	17	198	11.6	26	1	0	–	–	–	–	0
Career		158	118	427	5,812	13.6	76	43	2	2	1.0	1.0	0	9

=== Postseason ===
Year	Team	Games		Receiving					Rushing					Fumbles
Year	Team	GP	GS	Rec	Yds	Avg	Lng	TD	Att	Yds	Avg	Lng	TD	Fum
1963	CHI	1	1	3	38	**12.7**	15	0	0	–	–	–	–	0
1969	DAL	1	0	0	–	–	–	–	0	–	–	–	–	0
1970	DAL	3	0	1	5	5.0	5	0	0	–	–	–	–	0
1971	DAL	3	3	**5**	**51**	10.2	**21**	**1**	**1**	**17**	**17.0**	**17**	0	0
1972	DAL	2	2	2	13	6.5	9	0	0	–	–	–	–	0
Career		10	6	11	107	9.7	21	1	1	17	17.0	17	0	0

== Coaching career ==
After retiring from playing, following the 1972 season, Ditka was immediately hired as an assistant coach by Landry. Ditka spent nine seasons as an assistant coach with the Cowboys. During his tenure, the Cowboys made the playoffs eight times, won six division titles, three NFC championships, and a Super Bowl victory in 1977.

While working with the Cowboys, Ditka sent a letter to George Halas, his former head coach, who was still the owner of the Bears. In the letter, Ditka expressed regret for the acrimonious manner in which his time with the Bears had come to an end and said that he would like to come back to Chicago and be the head coach of the Bears "when he was ready". Meanwhile, the Cowboys continued to win games, although they did not win another Super Bowl while Ditka was there. His last game with the Cowboys was the 1981 NFC Championship Game, where the team fell to the San Francisco 49ers.

=== Chicago Bears ===
After firing previous coach Neill Armstrong following the 1981 season, Halas decided to take Ditka up on his offer from several years earlier, and hired him to become the team's head coach for the 1982 season. Although the Bears had made the playoffs twice in recent seasons, in 1979 under Armstrong and in 1977 his predecessor Jack Pardee, those were the only two winning seasons since Halas's retirement as coach following the 1967 season, so Halas was looking for a coach who would bring the Bears back to prominence. Shortly after his hiring, as recounted by Mike Singletary in 2006, Ditka called a team meeting. In the meeting, he warned the players there would be some changes coming, but if they were all willing to work hard for him and stand with him, Ditka promised a trip to the Super Bowl within three seasons. Specifically, Ditka said, "Give me three years, and if you walk with me, we'll get to the dance."

By his third season in 1984, Ditka led the Bears to the NFC Championship Game, where the Bears were shut out by the eventual Super Bowl champion San Francisco 49ers in San Francisco.

Ditka and the Super Bowl XX winning Bears team visited the White House in 2011

In 1985, Ditka led the Bears to a 15–1 record, and he was named NFL Coach of the Year by the Associated Press following the regular season. Ditka's coaching career hit its pinnacle on January 26, 1986, with a 46–10 win over the New England Patriots in Super Bowl XX at the Louisiana Superdome in New Orleans. Ditka stated that one of his biggest regrets in life was not letting Walter Payton score a touchdown in the Super Bowl, instead opting for Jim McMahon to run it in twice and rookie defensive tackle William "The Refrigerator" Perry to run it in once. Nevertheless, Ditka contended that his reluctance to give Payton the ball was justified on account of the disproportionately heavy coverage the Bears' star running back faced from the Patriots' defense, and insisted that Payton's mere presence on the field was a decisive factor in the Bears' crushing victory notwithstanding personal statistics.

Football commentators widely regard the 1985 Bears defense as one of the best in professional football history. The 1985 Bears defense was masterminded by defensive coordinator Buddy Ryan, with little oversight from Ditka; in fact, Ditka and Ryan had a largely adversarial relationship dating back to Ditka's hiring as Ryan, who was already on the coaching staff when Ditka joined the Bears, felt that he should have been promoted into the head-coaching position. Although the two men continued to work together, the relationship continued to deteriorate. With the Bears trailing by three touchdowns in a late-season Monday night game against the Miami Dolphins, the team's only loss, Ryan finally snapped after Ditka, as he recounted in 2006 for NFL Network, told him that the defensive scheme was not working. The two began throwing punches at each other and had to be separated. Ditka said, at that point, the relationship became unsalvageable. In an unusual gesture, following the Bears' Super Bowl victory, the players carried both Ryan and Ditka off the field. In addition, the 1985 Chicago Bears are one of several teams to consistently challenge the undefeated 1972 Miami Dolphins for the unofficial title of the "Greatest NFL Team of All-Time". The NFL Network series America's Game rated the 1985 Bears as the second-best Super Bowl champion, only behind the 1972 Miami Dolphins.

In 1986, Ryan left Chicago to become the head coach of the Philadelphia Eagles. When asked if he was happy Ryan was gone, Ditka replied he was not happy, but "elated". In 1986, 1987, and 1988, the Bears won the Central Division title and earned three home playoff games. The first of those years saw the Bears finish the regular season with a 14–2 record to tie the eventual Super Bowl champion New York Giants for the best in the entire league. However, the Bears were upset by the Washington Redskins in their first playoff game. The next year, the Bears finished second in the NFC with an 11–4 record, but were again upended by the Washington Redskins en route to that team's second Super Bowl victory of the decade. The Bears finished 12–4 in 1988 and gained homefield advantage. They defeated Ryan's Philadelphia Eagles in the Fog Bowl in their first game, but the team was defeated by the eventual Super Bowl champion San Francisco 49ers in the NFC Championship Game.

Ditka suffered a heart attack during the 1988 season, which he attributed to stress since he was in excellent physical condition and had no significant family history of heart disease. However, despite being expected to miss much of the season, Ditka was on the sidelines as an "advisor" the next week and back in full charge the week after. He led the Bears to a 12–4 record and received his second coach of the year award from the AP.

The Bears started 4–0 in 1989, but a series of last-second losses eventually led to a complete meltdown at the end of the season, as the Bears finished 6–10. The Bears rallied to win a weak Central Division in 1990 and make the playoffs as a wild card in 1991, but were eliminated convincingly in the early rounds by the New York Giants (who went on to win Super Bowl XXV) and the Dallas Cowboys, respectively. After dropping to 5–11 in the 1992 season, the Bears fired Ditka on January 5, 1993. His 106 wins are the second-most in Bears history, behind only Halas's 318 victories.

On December 9, 2013, Ditka's Bears jersey, number 89, was retired in a halftime ceremony during a Monday Night Football game in Chicago as the Chicago Bears hosted the Dallas Cowboys, for whom Ditka also played and worked as an assistant coach under the late Tom Landry. "Thank you, thank you, thank you, and go Bears!" Ditka told the crowd.

=== New Orleans Saints ===
In 1997, after a four-year absence in which he had served as a television analyst, Ditka returned to the NFL to take over as the permanent replacement for Jim Mora with the New Orleans Saints. In Ditka's first season back in the league in 1997, he struggled early, as the Saints lost four of their first five games. They did manage to beat his former team, the Chicago Bears, along the way, and recorded five more wins, but after winning only one game in the division (even being swept by the last-place St. Louis Rams), the Saints finished at 6–10.

Ditka's team played more inconsistently in 1998, as the Saints started out 3–0, but could not keep the momentum going. Still, they were in playoff contention toward the end of the season, and defeated the eventual NFC East champions in the guise of Ditka's other former squad, the Dallas Cowboys, to get to 6–7 with three games to go. They dropped their last three, though, and were eliminated in week 16 on a last-second field goal against the Arizona Cardinals.

Then, in the offseason that followed, Ditka was roundly criticized for the trading of all of the team's 1999 draft picks (plus their first-round draft pick in 2000) to the Washington Redskins to move up in the draft and select Texas running back Ricky Williams (Washington later used the picks to select future All-Pro and Hall of Famer Champ Bailey, Jon Jansen, and LaVar Arrington). The trade was further mocked because of a magazine cover in which Ditka posed with Williams, who was wearing a wedding dress.

The 1999 season proved to be the worst of Ditka's coaching career. After winning the season opener against the Carolina Panthers, the Saints dropped their next seven games, including a loss to the reactivated Cleveland Browns on a hail mary as time expired. This was the Browns' first win after their reactivation. As the season wore on, Ditka's frustrations began showing in the local media. After a late-season practice with the team sitting at 2–7, a grumpy Ditka gave a sixty-second press conference where he was very short tempered and dismissive of what he thought were stupid questions. When one of them made it a point to ask him why he was in such a bad mood, Ditka responded by saying "what do you care?", and then followed up by saying to the reporter "if you were 2–7, you'd be in a bad mood too." Ditka would take one more question before muttering to the reporters, "not very much fun, is it?", then going inside.

The low point of the season came three weeks later in a loss to the Atlanta Falcons, which was the Saints' 10th in 11 weeks. Ditka came into the postgame press conference appearing emotionally exhausted, and said he felt his charges "broke" him. He then said the Saints would be better off hiring someone else to coach the team, claiming he was the "wrong guy" to lead them and that "[he] didn't have it anymore", saying "God puts people in places for reasons, and he probably put me here to be humbled. I deserve it."

After two more losses, Ditka and the Saints faced the 7–7 Dallas Cowboys in their home finale on Christmas Eve. Ditka chose to give the start to Jake Delhomme, his third-string quarterback. In his first NFL start, Delhomme threw for two touchdowns and ran for a third, and Fred Weary took a forced fumble 56 yards for the game-winning score, as the Saints knocked off the Cowboys, 31–24. This proved to be Ditka's final victory as a head coach; after a 45–13 loss to the Carolina Panthers the following week left the Saints with a 3–13 record and their seventh consecutive nonwinning season, Ditka and general manager Bill Kuharich were fired on January 6, 2000.

Over a total of 14 seasons as a head coach, Ditka amassed a regular-season record of 121–95 and a postseason record of 6–6.

== Head coaching record ==
Team	Year	Regular season					Postseason			
Team	Year	Won	Lost	Ties	Win %	Finish	Won	Lost	Win %	Result
CHI	1982	3	6	0	.333	12th in NFC	—	—	—	—
CHI	1983	8	8	0	.500	3rd in NFC Central	—	—	—	—
CHI	1984	10	6	0	.625	1st in NFC Central	1	1	.500	Lost to San Francisco 49ers in NFC Championship Game
CHI	1985	15	1	0	.938	1st in NFC Central	3	0	1.000	Super Bowl XX champions
CHI	1986	14	2	0	.875	1st in NFC Central	0	1	.000	Lost to Washington Redskins in NFC Divisional Game
CHI	1987	11	4	0	.733	1st in NFC Central	0	1	.000	Lost to Washington Redskins in NFC Divisional Game
CHI	1988	12	4	0	.750	1st in NFC Central	1	1	.500	Lost to San Francisco 49ers in NFC Championship Game
CHI	1989	6	10	0	.375	4th in NFC Central	—	—	—	—
CHI	1990	11	5	0	.688	1st in NFC Central	1	1	.500	Lost to New York Giants in NFC Divisional Game
CHI	1991	11	5	0	.688	2nd in NFC Central	0	1	.000	Lost to Dallas Cowboys in NFC Wild Card Game
CHI	1992	5	11	0	.313	4th in NFC Central	—	—	—	—
CHI total		106	62	0	.631		6	6	.500	
NO	1997	6	10	0	.375	4th in NFC West	—	—	—	—
NO	1998	6	10	0	.375	3rd in NFC West	—	—	—	—
NO	1999	3	13	0	.188	5th in NFC West	—	—	—	—
NO total		15	33	0	.313		—	—	—	
Total		121	95	0	.560		6	6	.500	

== Broadcasting career ==
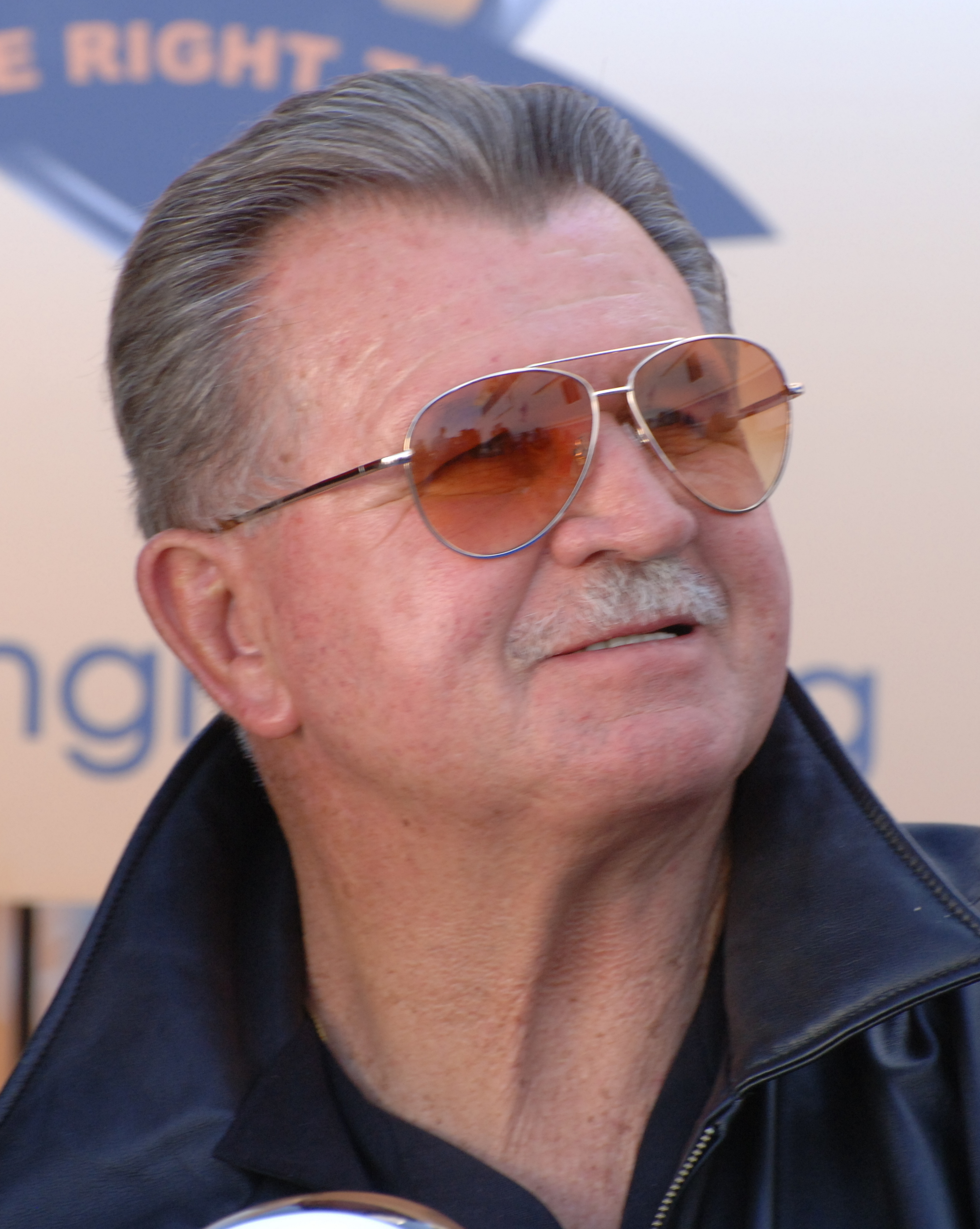
Ditka at the 2008 NFL Experience

Almost immediately after his dismissal from the Bears in 1993, Ditka took a broadcasting job with NBC, working as an analyst on NFL Live and as a color commentator for many other NBC broadcasts. After he was fired by the Saints, Ditka joined CBS Sports, spending the 2000 and 2001 seasons as a studio analyst on The NFL Today. He was a commentator on ESPN's NFL Live, ESPN's Sunday NFL Countdown, and CBS Radio–Westwood One's Monday Night Football pregame show.

Ditka regularly appeared on Chicago radio station ESPN 1000 (WMVP-AM), often broadcasting on Thursday mornings from one of his eponymous restaurants along with ESPN 1000 mid-morning hosts Marc Silverman and Tom Waddle, a former Bears player under Ditka.

Ditka served as color commentator for ESPN's September 10, 2007, broadcast of Monday Night Football, alongside Mike Greenberg and Mike Golic. He replicated this role on the second game of the doubleheader in 2008, as well. Ditka spent several years with ESPN working on Sunday NFL Countdown. In March 2016, ESPN and Ditka announced he would move to SportsCenter for remote-broadcasting analysis, as Ditka disliked the long distance from his home to the studio. This new role allowed him to stay at home, while still maintaining an analyst role with the network.

== Other ventures ==
Ditka wrote or contributed to a number of books including: Ditka: An Autobiography with friend and sports journalist Don Pierson, and The '85 Bears: We Were the Greatest with journalist Rick Telander, and In Life First You Kick Ass: Reflections on the 1985 Bears and Wisdom from Da Coach, again with Telander.

Ditka was also the subject of several books including Ditka: Monster of the Midway by Armen Keteyian and Ditka: The Player, the Coach, the Chicago Bears Legend, a compilation of Chicago Tribune stories written about Ditka throughout the years. He also a plays a large role in books written about the Bears such as Then Ditka Said to Payton and Monsters: The 1985 Chicago Bears and the Wild Heart of Football.

In 1987, following the success of the Chicago Bears' 1985 charity single "The Super Bowl Shuffle", the video's producer Richard E. Meyer created a similar music video starring Ditka, titled "The Grabowski Shuffle." The video, about "working hard to get what you want", was inspired by a comment Ditka had made about his team's reputation: "There are Smiths and there are Grabowskis; we're the Grabowskis."

In 1991, Ditka cooperated with Accolade to produce the computer game Mike Ditka Ultimate Football and the Sega Mega Drive game Mike Ditka Power Football. In 1995, Ditka starred as a football coach in a full-motion video game called Quarterback Attack with Mike Ditka, released for the Sega Saturn, PC, and 3DO.

In 1993, Ditka appeared as himself in the 271st and final episode of the American television sitcom Cheers. Ditka also appeared as himself in the Chicago-set sitcom According to Jim, in the 2002 episode "Cars & Chicks". Ditka also made guest appearances and cameos on several other shows, including L.A. Law, Saturday Night Live, and 3rd Rock from the Sun. In 2005, Ditka had a major role in the comedy Kicking & Screaming, playing himself; he was recruited by Will Ferrell's character to be an assistant little league soccer coach.

Ditka appeared in commercials and ads for over 50 products over the years including the department store Montgomery Ward, Hanes underwear, Coors Beer, Old Navy clothing stores, McDonald's (infamously donning a Green Bay Packers sweater) and Campbell's Soup. He starred in high-profile Super Bowl ads for Frito Lay potato chips (alongside Tom Landry and other NFL legends), Budweiser beer (coaching in the Bud Bowl), Blockbuster Video (during the pregame show), and Cosentino Silestone countertops (with fellow 1985 Bears Jim McMahon and William Perry and former Chicago Bulls star Dennis Rodman).

Ditka infamously performed as a guest conductor for "Take Me Out to the Ballgame" during a Chicago Cubs game at Wrigley Field on July 5, 1998, the first season after the death of Harry Caray, who had previously led the song. Running late because of traffic, Ditka raced to the broadcast booth and shouted through an abbreviated 20-scond rendition of the song with the stadium organist struggling to keep pace. Ditka's rendition often turns up on lists of the worst guest conductors Ditka got a shot at redemption on May 7, 2005, teaming with Ferrell (doing his Caray imitation) to sing during the stretch, while promoting the release of Kicking and Screaming.

Ditka was inducted to the National Polish-American Sports Hall of Fame in 2001.

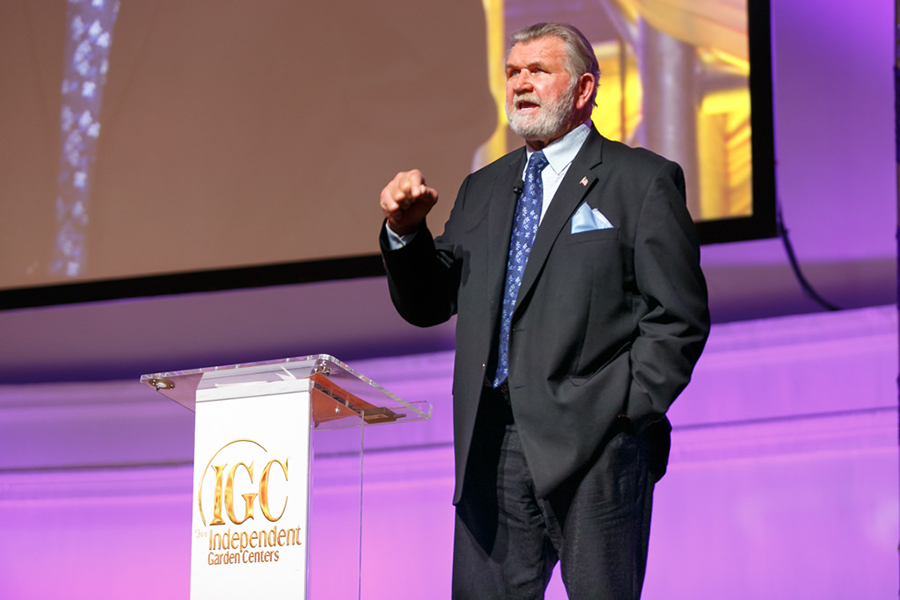
Ditka presenting a keynote speech in Chicago in 2010

Angry at the wealthy NFL for ignoring the players who helped to create the league, Ditka and other former players have attempted to raise funds, in the words of Hall of Famer Joe DeLamielleure, "for guys who made this league and built it on their backs, their knees, their legs and now they're all broken down and they can't even get a decent pension." This would become known as the Gridiron Greats Assistance Fund. Ultimately, however, in December 2007, Ditka folded his "Hall of Fame Assistance Trust Fund" charity amidst revelations that, "in 2005, the group gave out more money to pay celebrities to play golf than the group in its entire three years of operation gave out to injured players", according to Laurie Styron of the American Institute of Philanthropy. During Super Bowl XLIV, Ditka (who was not in the original group) joined other members of the 1985 Chicago Bears in resurrecting "The Super Bowl Shuffle" in a Boost Mobile commercial. In the spring of 2007, Ditka worked alongside X Management and Geneva Hospitality to form Mike Ditka Resorts, currently consisting of two resorts in the Orlando, Florida, area. Ditka owned a chain of restaurants, "Ditka's", which has three locations in Illinois and one in Pittsburgh, Pennsylvania. Ditka discovered singer John Vincent, who has been performing at his Chicago restaurant since 2001. Vincent performs in 20 different voices and sings the U.S. National Anthem regularly for the NFL, NBA, and MLB. Ditka and Vincent also owned a record label together.

Ditka was a co-owner the Chicago Rush, an Arena Football League team. In August 2011, media reports noted that Ditka would be a financial investor for the new Elite Football League of India, a now defunct American style football league which was India's first.

In 2012, Ditka partnered with Terlato Wines to produce his own collection of wines, produced in California. The partnership stemmed from a 20-year friendship between Ditka and Bill Terlato and their shared love of sports and food and wine. The first Mike Ditka Wines were released in fall 2012, including eight labels highlighting his career: "The Player" (2011 Pinot Grigio and 2010 Merlot), "The Coach" (2011 Sauvignon Blanc and 2010 Cabernet Sauvignon), " The Hall of Famer" (2011 Chardonnay and 2011 Pinot Noir), and "The Restaurateur" pair which includes "The Icon" (2010 Cabernet Sauvignon) and "The Champion" (2010 Red Blend)." The same year, Ditka and Camacho Cigars partnered and produced a line of cigars called "The Mike Ditka Kickoff Series". These cigars are named to highlight the milestones of Coach Ditka's football career: "The Player", The Coach", and "The Hall of Famer". All of these cigars are produced in Honduras.

In 2013, Ditka and Vienna Beef partnered to create Ditka Sausages, which are eight inches long and one-third pound in weight. The two types are "Hot Beef Polish Sausage" and "Chicken Sausage with Mozzarella and Sun-Dried Tomatoes".

In 2020, Ditka became the owner of the X League, a women's tackle football league that was originally the Lingerie Football League.

== Personal life ==
Ditka was married to his first wife, Marge, from 1961 to 1973. They had four children together: three sons and one daughter. He married Diane (née Trantham) Ditka in 1977.

During the 1985 season, he was arrested on Interstate 294 near O'Hare International Airport and later convicted of DUI after returning from a game against the San Francisco 49ers.

From 1989 until 1997, Ditka lived in Bannockburn, Illinois. From 1997 until 2001, Ditka lived in an area of New Orleans known as English Turn.

He was a practicing Roman Catholic and a member of the Knights of Columbus.

=== Political views ===
Ditka was known for his vocal conservative views. In July 2004, Ditka, a self-described "ultra-ultra-ultra conservative", was reportedly considering running against the Democratic candidate, state senator Barack Obama, for an open seat in the U.S. Senate for Illinois in the 2004 Senate election. The seat was being vacated by the retiring Peter Fitzgerald, a Republican, and Republican nominee Jack Ryan withdrew from the race amid controversy at the end of June, leaving the Republicans in a bind. Local and national political leaders, from Illinois Republican Party Chair Judy Baar Topinka to National Republican Senatorial Committee Chair George Allen, whose father by the same name was an assistant coach with the Bears in the 1960s when Ditka played, met with Ditka in an effort to persuade him to fill the spot on the ticket. On July 14, however, Ditka announced he would not seek the nomination, citing personal and business considerations. His wife was against the run and he operated a chain of restaurants. Obama went on to defeat the eventual Republican candidate, former U.S. ambassador Alan Keyes, in a landslide in the November 2004 election. Ditka had since regretted not running. He also believed that Obama never would have been elected president if he had run against Obama for Senate in 2004, and claimed that Obama is the worst president in United States history.

In stark contrast to the above-stated positions, Ditka appeared in an ad during the 2010 Illinois gubernatorial election for incumbent Democratic governor Pat Quinn. In the ad, Ditka stated that, "[D]oing the right thing for the people who put you in office is more important than what you can do for yourself in office ... and I think he'll do that. I think he understands that ... and I think he's good people." Quinn, at the time, was locked into a tight race against State Senator Bill Brady, a conservative Republican from Bloomington. Quinn would go on to narrowly defeat Brady. Four years later, in 2014, Ditka appeared in a televised campaign ad for Quinn's Republican challenger, Bruce Rauner, who defeated Quinn in the general election.

In October 2011, Ditka and the 1985 team went to the White House after they did not attend in 1986 due to the Space Shuttle Challenger disaster. He presented President Obama with a Chicago Bears jersey with the number 85 on it with "Obama" on the back of it.

Ditka was a vocal supporter of Donald Trump's election campaign, saying "I support Trump all the way. I really do."

Some of Ditka's comments, most notably regarding former San Francisco 49ers quarterback Colin Kaepernick's national anthem protests, garnered interest due to Ditka's position with ESPN. Under the network's new social media policy (implemented in late 2017 in the wake of Curt Schilling's firing and Jemele Hill's suspension), Ditka was to refrain from making controversial statements, but made a series of remarks in late 2017 that drew widespread criticism. In a September interview with a Dallas-based radio station, Ditka was critical of Kaepernick's protests, saying "I think it's a problem. Anybody who disrespects this country and the flag. If they don't like the country they don't like our flag, get the hell out." In the same interview, Ditka was dismissive of social issues in America, saying "I don't see all the atrocities going on in this country that people say are going on, I see opportunities if people want to look for opportunity – now if they don't want to look for them – then you can find problems with anything, but this is the land of opportunity because you can be anything you want to be if you work. If you don't work, that's a different problem."

In October 2017, during a Bears/Vikings pregame show, Ditka said he did not believe that there was any oppression in America for the last 100 years: "There has been no oppression in the last 100 years that I know of. Now maybe I'm not watching it as carefully as other people." Ditka was criticized for his comments, including by former New York Jets quarterback Joe Namath, who said, "Look up the definition of oppression, and you understand that it's obviously taken place," as well as by Chicago Sun-Times columnists who said Ditka was "not a Chicagoan" and "a white man who is blind to the plight of people of color in this country." The NFL permitted Ditka's comments, but hedged, "Everyone's entitled to an opinion. The league would not express that opinion, by any stretch of the imagination." Ditka quickly clarified his remarks in a release, apologizing to anyone who may have been offended by his comments: "The characterization of the statement that I made does not reflect the context of the question that I was answering and certainly does not reflect my views throughout my lifetime. I have absolutely seen oppression in society in the last 100 years and I am completely intolerant of any discrimination."

=== Health and death ===
In the midst of a successful 1988 season, he suffered a heart attack, but recovered quickly. On November 16, 2012, he suffered a minor stroke at a suburban country club in Chicago. Later in the day, Ditka reported he was feeling "good right now and it's not a big deal."

On November 23, 2018, Ditka was hospitalized in Naples, Florida, after suffering a heart attack while playing golf. In late 2024, Ditka moved back to Chicago, later putting up his Naples home for sale.

Ditka died in Chicago on October 9, 2026 at the age of 86 and 9 days before his 87th birthday. He was suffering from heart disease. His death was announced by his family through Jarrett Payton, son of Walter Payton. In a statement after his death, the Bears said that "[Ditka's] impact on the Chicago Bears organization, over decades as a player, coach, and proud icon and ambassador for our organization, is immeasurable". The Bears will wear a tribute helmet decal and jersey patch for the rest of the 2026 season.

After learning of Ditka's death, President Donald Trump remembered Ditka as a "winner" and "tough cookie". Former president Barack Obama issued a statement, "When I got to Chicago in the summer of 1985, Mike Ditka and the Chicago Bears were king. Coach Ditka set the tone for a team that was punishing, dominant, and fun — and the city loved him for it."

== Legacy ==
Following his death, The New York Times regarded Ditka as "one of [football's] most visible and enduring talking heads". ESPN noted him as a "legendary coach" who led the Bears in "arguably the greatest defense in NFL history". Yahoo called Ditka a pop culture icon for "unapologetically being himself" and credited his personality for making him different from the "slog coaches" often seen in football. Associated Press also called Ditka the "quintessential Chicago Bear" who was an influential player in the sport as he "helped revolutionize the tight end position" and became "NFL’s most recognizable, and imitated, personality". USA Today also noted Ditka as a revolutionary figure in football, saying that he "revolutionized football even before coaching".

The Pro Football Network said that Ditka "made the game of football better". While also regarding his appearance as iconic, The Los Angeles Times also noted his time as a player and coach is what "cemented his name in NFL history". CBS News also called Ditka a "legendary coach", with the BBC referring to him as an "NFL icon".

NFL Commissioner Roger Goodell said that Ditka was an "ambassador for the game" who "epitomized football over so many years" as a player, coach and Hall of Famer.

On October 22, 2026, the Bears paid tribute to Ditka during their Thursday night game against the New England Patriots. The Bears honored Ditka with stadium-wide tributes including commemorative No. 89 patches on player uniforms, pre-game 89:00 clock displays, knit headband giveaways for the first 10,000 fans, and fake mustaches for all fans in attendance.

== See also ==
- Bill Swerski's Superfans
- List of celebrities who own wineries and vineyards
- List of National Football League head coaches with 50 wins
