= Keith Mitchell (American football) =

American football player (1974–2026)

No. 59
- Position: Linebacker

Personal information
- Born: July 24, 1974; Garland, Texas, U.S.
- Died: July 2, 2026 (aged 51); Cancún, Quintana Roo, Mexico
- Listed height: 6 ft 2 in (1.88 m)
- Listed weight: 236 lb (107 kg)

Career information
- High school: Lakeview Centennial (Garland)
- College: Texas A&M
- NFL draft: 1997: undrafted

Career history
- New Orleans Saints (1997–2001); Houston Texans (2002); Jacksonville Jaguars (2003)

Awards and highlights
- Pro Bowl (2000); First-team All-American (1996); Second-team All-SWC (1995)

Career NFL statistics
- Total tackles: 416
- Sacks: 19.5
- Interceptions: 4
- Forced fumbles: 9
- Passes defended: 22
- Defensive touchdowns: 3
- Stats at Pro Football Reference

Carlence Marquis "Keith" Mitchell (July 24, 1974 – July 2, 2026) was an American professional football player who was a linebacker in the National Football League (NFL) for the New Orleans Saints, Houston Texans, and Jacksonville Jaguars between 1997 and 2003. He played college football for the Texas A&M Aggies.

== Early life and college ==
Mitchell attended Lakeview Centennial High School in Garland, Texas, and went on to an outstanding college career at Texas A&M University, where he was part of a star-studded defense known as the "Wrecking Crew".

He was a talented pass rusher who was among the NCAA leaders in quarterback sacks during his junior and senior years. He had 34 career sacks for the Aggies and 18.5 career tackles behind the line of scrimmage. As a senior, Mitchell had 14.5 sacks and 10.5 other tackles for loss. Although constantly double-teamed, he still managed 50 solo tackles as a senior. Mitchell was the defensive MVP of the Aggies' 1995 Alamo Bowl victory over Michigan. He was named to The Sporting News college All-America second-team and to the first-team College Football News All-American team as an outside linebacker in 1996. In 2015, he was inducted into the Texas A&M Athletics Hall of Fame.

== Professional career ==
In spite of his collegiate success, Mitchell was not selected in the NFL draft because of concerns over his lack of bulk and ineffectiveness in coverage. He was signed by the New Orleans Saints and found immediate success with that club, appearing in 79 consecutive games during 5 seasons with the team, and making 60 starts over his final 4 seasons (in which he averaged 93 tackles and 4 sacks). His Saints career was highlighted by a 2000 season where he recorded 6.5 sacks, had 2 defensive touchdown returns, and was named to the Pro Bowl.

His success with the Saints was based largely on the fact that former defensive coordinator Ron Zook played to Mitchell's strengths and employed three down linemen with an outside linebacker (usually Mitchell) lining up as a defensive end. Mitchell's role had been similar as a college player, where he saw most of his success utilizing his great speed as a blitzing outside linebacker.

In 2001, Charlie Clemons replaced Mitchell as the Saints' rush end linebacker, producing a team-leading 13.5 sacks and an interception. Mitchell recorded only two sacks that year. Mitchell asked for his release following the 2001 season, and was signed by the Houston Texans. Mitchell started 7 consecutive games for the Texans in 2002, but his playing time was limited as a result of injuries, and he did not appear in a game after November 17 of that year. He was signed as an unrestricted free agent in March 2003 by the Jacksonville Jaguars and started for the Jags first two games of the 2003 season, his last in the NFL, but was injured and only appeared in one game for the remainder of the season.

=== NFL statistics ===
Year	Team	Games	Combined tackles	Tackles	Assisted tackles	Sacks	Forced fumbles	Fumble recoveries	Fumble return yards	Interceptions	Interception return yards	Yards per Interception Return	Longest interception return	Interceptions returned for touchdown	Passes defended
1997	NO	16	24	20	4	4.0	0	0	0	0	0	0	0	0	0
1998	NO	16	73	46	27	2.5	4	3	0	0	0	0	0	0	0
1999	NO	16	102	74	28	3.5	3	1	0	3	22	7	18	0	13
2000	NO	16	85	59	26	6.5	0	4	0	1	40	40	40	1	5
2001	NO	15	89	61	28	2.0	2	0	0	0	0	0	0	0	2
2002	HOU	11	28	21	7	1.0	1	0	0	0	0	0	0	0	1
2003	JAX	4	7	5	2	0.0	0	0	0	0	0	0	0	0	1
Career		94	408	286	122	19.5	10	8	0	4	62	16	40	1	22

== Career after football ==
After his football career ended, Mitchell became an author, inspirational speaker, yoga instructor, and mindfulness and wellness coach. He was introduced to yoga while recovering from a football caused spinal injury and became a certified master yoga instructor. He authored the book Mindfulness Mastery Playbook: 8 Strategies for Winning The Game of Life.

== Death ==
Mitchell died on July 1, 2026, at the age of 51 in Cancun, Mexico.
