= Keith Poole =

American football player (born 1974)

No. 83, 81
- Position: Wide receiver

Personal information
- Born: June 18, 1974 (age 52); San Jose, California, U.S.
- Listed height: 6 ft 0 in (1.83 m)
- Listed weight: 188 lb (85 kg)

Career information
- High school: Clovis (Clovis, California)
- College: Arizona State
- NFL draft: 1997: 4th round, 116th overall pick

Career history
- New Orleans Saints (1997–2000); Denver Broncos (2001); Tampa Bay Buccaneers (2002)*
- * Offseason or practice squad member only

Awards and highlights
- Second-team All-American (1996); 2× First-team All-Pac-10 (1995, 1996)

Career NFL statistics
- Receptions: 96
- Receiving yards: 1,734
- Receiving touchdowns: 11
- Stats at Pro Football Reference

Keith Robert Strohmaier Poole (born June 18, 1974) is an American former professional football player who was a wide receiver in the National Football League (NFL) for the New Orleans Saints and Denver Broncos from 1997 to 2001. Poole was a stand out receiver at Clovis High School in Clovis, California. He played college football for Arizona State Sun Devils, earning second-team All-American honors in 1996. That season, he and quarterback Jake Plummer helped lead the Sun Devils to the Rose Bowl only to lose to Ohio State 20–17.

Poole was selected by the Saints in the fourth round of the 1997 NFL draft. In his five-year NFL career, Poole caught 96 receptions for 1,734 yards and 11 touchdowns.

In 1998, the Los Angeles Times and CBS News reported that he had pled guilty to misdemeanor battery for attacking a man with a golf club, and had been sentenced to two years of probation. He was fined $4,500, according to the Saints and NFL.
