= Marvin Powell (fullback) =

American football player (born 1976)

No. 40
- Position: Fullback

Personal information
- Born: June 6, 1976 (age 50); Los Angeles, California, U.S.
- Listed height: 6 ft 2 in (1.88 m)
- Listed weight: 235 lb (107 kg)

Career information
- High school: Birmingham (Los Angeles)
- College: USC (1995–1998)
- NFL draft: 1999: undrafted

Career history
- New Orleans Saints (1999–2000); Green Bay Packers (2000)*; Denver Broncos (2001)*
- * Offseason or practice squad member only

Career NFL statistics
- Games played: 9
- Rushing yards: 1
- Tackles: 2
- Stats at Pro Football Reference

Marvin Powell III (born June 6, 1976) is an American former professional football fullback who played in the National Football League (NFL) for the New Orleans Saints, Green Bay Packers and Denver Broncos. He played college football for the USC Trojans.

== Early life ==
Powell was born on June 6, 1976, in Los Angeles, California. He attended Birmingham High School in Los Angeles.

== College career ==
Powell played college football for the USC Trojans from 1995 to 1998. As a fullback, tight end and safety, he had seven receptions for 39 yards and one touchdown.

== Professional career ==
=== New Orleans Saints ===
After going undrafted in the 1999 NFL draft, Powell signed with the New Orleans Saints as an undrafted free agent. On September 5, he was waived and signed to the practice squad. On October 23, Powell was signed to the active roster. He played in nine games, recording one rushing yard and two tackles. On February 11, 2000, Powell signed a futures contract with the team.

=== Green Bay Packers ===
On July 11, 2000, Powell was traded to the Green Bay Packers in exchange for tight end, Lawrence Hart. On August 15, he was waived by the team.

=== Denver Broncos ===
On January 2, 2001, the Denver Broncos signed Powell to a futures contract. On April 5, he was released.

== Personal life ==
Powell's father, Marvin, played in the NFL for the New York Jets and Tampa Bay Buccaneers at tackle.
