= P. J. Franklin =

American football player (born 1977)

No. 80
- Position: Wide receiver

Personal information
- Born: September 28, 1977 (age 49); Independence, Louisiana, U.S.
- Listed height: 5 ft 10 in (1.78 m)
- Listed weight: 180 lb (82 kg)

Career information
- College: Tulane
- NFL draft: 1999: undrafted

Career history
- New Orleans Saints (1999)
- Stats at Pro Football Reference

David L. Franklin Jr. (born September 28, 1977) is an American former professional football player who was a wide receiver for the New Orleans Saints of the National Football League (NFL). He played college football for the Tulane Green Wave.
