= Austin Robbins =

American football player (born 1971)

No. 95, 99
- Position: Defensive tackle

Personal information
- Born: March 1, 1971 (age 55); Washington, D.C., U.S.
- Listed height: 6 ft 6 in (1.98 m)
- Listed weight: 290 lb (132 kg)

Career information
- High school: H.D. Woodson (Washington, D.C.)
- College: North Carolina
- NFL draft: 1994: 4th round, 120th overall pick

Career history
- Los Angeles/Oakland Raiders (1994–1995); New Orleans Saints (1996–1999); Oakland Raiders (2000); Green Bay Packers (2000)

Awards and highlights
- Second-team All-ACC (1993)

Career NFL statistics
- Tackles: 79
- Sacks: 6
- Fumble recoveries: 4
- Stats at Pro Football Reference

Austin Dion Robbins (born March 1, 1971) is a former defensive lineman in the National Football League (NFL) who played for the Los Angeles/Oakland Raiders, New Orleans Saints, and Green Bay Packers. Robbins played collegiate ball for the University of North Carolina at Chapel Hill before being selected by the Raiders in the fourth round of the 1994 NFL draft. He played professional football for 7 seasons and retired in 2000.
