= Julian Pittman =

American football player (born 1975)

No. 75
- Positions: Defensive end, defensive tackle

Personal information
- Born: May 22, 1975 (age 51); Niceville, Florida, U.S.
- Listed height: 6 ft 4 in (1.93 m)
- Listed weight: 286 lb (130 kg)

Career information
- High school: Niceville
- College: Florida State
- NFL draft: 1998: 4th round, 99th overall pick

Career history
- New Orleans Saints (1998)

Career NFL statistics
- Tackles: 2
- Stats at Pro Football Reference

Julian Roosevelt Pittman (born May 22, 1975) is an American former professional football player who was a defensive end in the National Football League. He played college football for the Florida State Seminoles and was selected in the fourth round of the 1998 NFL draft with the 99th overall pick. He played with the New Orleans Saints in 1998.
