= Troy Wilson (defensive lineman) =

American football player (born 1970)

No. 92, 91, 79, 95, 71
- Position: Defensive end

Personal information
- Born: November 22, 1970 (age 55); Topeka, Kansas, U.S.
- Listed height: 6 ft 4 in (1.93 m)
- Listed weight: 257 lb (117 kg)

Career information
- High school: Shawnee Heights (Tecumseh, Kansas)
- College: Pittsburg State
- NFL draft: 1993: 7th round, 194th overall pick

Career history
- San Francisco 49ers (1993–1994); Denver Broncos (1995); Kansas City Chiefs (1996)*; St. Louis Rams (1997)*; San Francisco 49ers (1998)*; New Orleans Saints (1998–1999); Chicago Bears (2000); San Francisco 49ers (2001); Tampa Bay Storm (2002–2003)
- * Offseason or practice squad member only

Awards and highlights
- Super Bowl champion (XXIX); Arena Bowl champion (2003); NCAA Division II national champion (1991)

Career NFL statistics
- Tackles: 73
- Sacks: 15.5
- Forced fumbles: 4
- Stats at Pro Football Reference

Career AFL statistics
- Tackles: 23
- Sacks: 3
- Passes defended: 4
- Stats at ArenaFan.com

Troy Ethan Wilson (born November 22, 1970) is an American former professional football player who was a defensive lineman in the National Football League (NFL). Wilson had a seven-year career playing defensive end for the San Francisco 49ers, Denver Broncos, New Orleans Saints, and Chicago Bears.

Wilson played college football for the Pittsburg State Gorillas from 1989 to 1992, helping them win the 1991 NCAA Division II national championship.

He was selected by the 49ers in the seventh round (194th overall) of the 1993 NFL draft. Wilson was a member of the 49ers Super Bowl championship team in 1994.

Wilson played for the Tampa Bay Storm in the Arena Football League (AFL) in 2002 and 2003. He was a member of the 2003 Arena Bowl championship team.
