= John Farquhar (American football) =

American football player (born 1972)

No. 89, 86, 87
- Position: Tight end

Personal information
- Born: March 22, 1972 (age 54); Stanford, California, U.S.
- Listed height: 6 ft 6 in (1.98 m)
- Listed weight: 278 lb (126 kg)

Career information
- High school: Menlo-Atherton (Atherton, California)
- College: Duke
- NFL draft: 1995: undrafted

Career history
- Denver Broncos (1995)*; Pittsburgh Steelers (1996)*; Tampa Bay Buccaneers (1996); Pittsburgh Steelers (1996); New Orleans Saints (1997–1998)
- * Offseason or practice squad member only

Career NFL statistics
- Receptions: 18
- Receiving yards: 266
- Touchdowns: 1
- Stats at Pro Football Reference

John Farquhar is an American former professional football player who was a tight end for five seasons in the National Football League (NFL) for the Tampa Bay Buccaneers, Pittsburgh Steelers, and New Orleans Saints. He played college football for the Duke Blue Devils.

After his football career,, Farquhar transitioned into a business career. He is now the chief executive officer of HeartFlow Inc., a public healthcare technology company focused on the diagnosis of coronary artery disease.
