= Wilmont Perry =

American football player (born 1975)

No. 33
- Position: Running back

Personal information
- Born: February 25, 1975 (age 51); Franklinton, North Carolina, U.S.
- Listed height: 6 ft 1 in (1.85 m)
- Listed weight: 235 lb (107 kg)

Career information
- High school: Garner (NC)
- College: Livingstone
- NFL draft: 1998: 5th round, 132nd overall pick

Career history
- New Orleans Saints (1998–1999); Carolina Panthers (2000-2001)*; Cape Fear Wildcats (2002–2003); Columbus Destroyers (2004–2005); Fayetteville Guard (2005–2009); Richmond Raiders (2010); Cape Fear Heroes (2011–?)
- * Offseason or practice squad member only

Career NFL statistics
- Rushing att–yards: 78–302
- Receptions–yards: 5–28
- Touchdowns: 0
- Stats at Pro Football Reference
- Stats at ArenaFan.com

Wilmont Darnell Perry (born February 25, 1975) is an American former professional football player.

Perry was selected by the New Orleans Saints in the fifth round of the 1998 NFL draft. He also played running back for two seasons for the Saints in 1998 and 1999. He played college football from 1994 to 1998 at Livingstone College in Salisbury, North Carolina. He was nominated to the Central Intercollegiate Athletic Association All-Conference teams in his junior and senior seasons. Perry also played in the Arena Football League (AFL).
