= Aaron Craver =

American football player (born 1965)

No. 29, 32, 34
- Positions: Running back, kick returner

Personal information
- Born: December 18, 1968 (age 57); Los Angeles, California, U.S.
- Listed height: 5 ft 11 in (1.80 m)
- Listed weight: 215 lb (98 kg)

Career information
- High school: Compton (Compton, California)
- College: Fresno State
- NFL draft: 1991: 3rd round, 60th overall pick

Career history

Playing
- Miami Dolphins (1991–1994); Denver Broncos (1995–1996); San Diego Chargers (1997); New Orleans Saints (1998–1999)

Coaching
- Woodbridge High School (2021–2024) Head coach; University High School (2024–present) Head coach

Career NFL statistics
- Rushing yards: 966
- Rushing average: 4
- Rushing touchdowns: 10
- Stats at Pro Football Reference

Aaron LaRenze Craver (born December 18, 1968) is an American former professional football player who was a running back and kick returner in the National Football League (NFL) for the Miami Dolphins, Denver Broncos, San Diego Chargers, and the New Orleans Saints. He played college football for the Fresno State Bulldogs. The Dolphins selected him in the third round of the 1991 NFL draft. Craver is the only football player to catch a touchdown pass from John Elway and Dan Marino. In 2006, he was inducted into the Fresno County Athletic Hall of Fame. Craver is currently the football coach at University High School in Irvine, California.
