= Rob Kelly (American football) =

American football player (born 1974)

No. 33, 24, 44, 27
- Position: Safety

Personal information
- Born: June 21, 1974 (age 52); Mount Vernon, Ohio, U.S.
- Listed height: 6 ft 2 in (1.88 m)
- Listed weight: 199 lb (90 kg)

Career information
- High school: Newark Catholic (OH)
- College: Ohio State
- NFL draft: 1997: 2nd round, 33rd overall pick

Career history
- New Orleans Saints (1997–2000); New England Patriots (2002)

Career NFL statistics
- Tackles: 101
- Interceptions: 4
- Touchdowns: 1
- Stats at Pro Football Reference

Robert James Kelly III (born June 21, 1974) is an American former professional football player who was a safety for four seasons with the New Orleans Saints in the National Football League (NFL) and one on the injured reserve list for the New England Patriots. He played college football for the Ohio State Buckeyes.

== Career ==
Kelly was selected in the second round of the 1997 NFL draft with the 33rd overall pick. Kelly retired from football in 2002 and age 28, after he sustained an injury during training camp to a nerve between his neck and shoulder.
