= Bill Kuharich =

American football executive

Bill Kuharich is an American professional football executive, specializing in player-personnel (i.e., evaluating and selecting players); he has also held the general manager position. Kuharich is the son of Joe Kuharich, former college and NFL head coach. He attended Middlebury College graduating in 1976 with a degree in History, and received a master's degree in education from St. Lawrence University. He also attended Deerfield Academy and Malvern Preparatory School.

In the mid-1980s, Kuharich was assistant general manager and director of player personnel for the Philadelphia/Baltimore Stars of the United States Football League. The team won the USFL championship two out of the three years the league existed.

Kuharich worked in multiple capacities for the New Orleans Saints, from 1986 to 1999, as: director of player personnel (1986–1993); vice president of football operations (1994–1995); executive vice president and general manager (1996); and, president and general manager and chief operating officer (1997–1999). During his tenure, the team acquired (eventual) Pro Bowl-grade players such as Willie Roaf, Sammy Knight, and La'Roi Glover.

As the Kansas City Chiefs' pro personnel director (2000-2005), Kuharich helped orchestrate the acquisitions of Priest Holmes, Eddie Kennison, Trent Green and (eventual Pro Football Hall of Famer), Willie Roaf. Kuharich was promoted to vice-president of player personnel in 2006; between 2006 and 2008, they acquired standouts like Tamba Hali; Dwayne Bowe; Brandon Flowers; Jamaal Charles, and Brandon Carr. Kuharich was released by the Chiefs on April 29, 2009.

On February 11, 2014, Kuharich was hired by the Cleveland Browns to advise first-time general manager Ray Farmer on player-personnel. Farmer had worked under Kuharich when both were with the Chiefs.

On May 20, 2014, Kuharich was named executive chief of staff by the Cleveland Browns. Kuharich played a pivotal role in the organization's personnel's moves, including the college and pro scouting departments, serving as a key cog in all facets of the Brown' process of evaluating and acquiring talent. He also assisted GM Ray Farmer in key decisions in the team's overall strategic vision as well as decisions involving NFL league matters. He was released along with the rest of Ray Farmer’s staff on January 4, 2016.

In April 2018, Kuharich was named VP/player personnel of the Alliance of American Football (AAF) by Bill Polian. The Spring League kicked off the Inaugural season in February 2019. He remained in that position until the league disbanded in April 2019.
