= Cam Cleeland =

American football player (born 1975)

No. 85, 87, 82
- Position: Tight end

Personal information
- Born: August 15, 1975 (age 51); Sedro-Woolley, Washington, U.S.
- Listed height: 6 ft 5 in (1.96 m)
- Listed weight: 272 lb (123 kg)

Career information
- High school: Sedro-Woolley
- College: Washington
- NFL draft: 1998: 2nd round, 40th overall pick

Career history
- New Orleans Saints (1998–2001); New England Patriots (2002); St. Louis Rams (2003–2005)

Awards and highlights
- First-team All-Pac-10 (1997)

Career NFL statistics
- Receptions: 131
- Receiving yards: 1,478
- Receiving touchdowns: 13
- Stats at Pro Football Reference

Cameron Ross Cleeland (born August 15, 1975) is an American professional football tight end who played in the National Football League (NFL). He was selected by the New Orleans Saints in the second round of the 1998 NFL draft. Cleeland played for the Saints, New England Patriots and St. Louis Rams. He went to the University of Washington.

While a rookie with the Saints, he was struck in the eye by linebacker Andre Royal with a sock filled with coins during a hazing incident. Cleeland nearly lost his eye in addition to suffering a broken eye socket and broken nose. The injury permanently affected his eyesight.
