= Brett Bech =

American football player and coach (born 1971)

No. 87, 19, 89, 84, 7
- Position: Wide receiver

Personal information
- Born: August 20, 1971 (age 55); Slidell, Louisiana, U.S.
- Listed height: 6 ft 1 in (1.85 m)
- Listed weight: 184 lb (83 kg)

Career information
- High school: Slidell
- College: LSU
- NFL draft: 1995: undrafted

Career history

Playing
- Jacksonville Jaguars (1995)*; San Antonio Texans (1995); New Orleans Saints (1996–1999); Las Vegas Outlaws (2001); Indiana Firebirds (2002–2004)
- * Offseason or practice squad member only

Coaching
- New York Jets (2006); Jacksonville Jaguars (2007–2008); Dallas Cowboys (2011–present)

Career NFL statistics
- Receptions: 21
- Receiving yards: 379
- Touchdowns: 4
- Stats at Pro Football Reference

Career AFL statistics
- Receptions: 101
- Receiving yards: 1,363
- Touchdowns: 25
- Stats at ArenaFan.com

Brett Lamar Bech (born August 20, 1971) is an American former professional football player who was a wide receiver in the National Football League (NFL), Arena Football League (AFL) and XFL. He is currently the Director of Strength Training Protocol for OxeFit, formerly the Dallas Cowboys assistant strength and conditioning coach. He played for the New Orleans Saints in the NFL, the Indiana Firebirds in the AFL and the Las Vegas Outlaws of the XFL. He played college football for the LSU Tigers.

== Personal life ==
Bech's nephew, Jack, plays in the NFL for the Las Vegas Raiders. Another nephew, former Princeton wide receiver Tiger, was killed in the 2025 New Orleans truck attack. He and Jack Bech, along with Louis and Cathy Tenedorio ended the player introduction ceremonies at Super Bowl LIX with the ceremonial coin toss.
