= 2000 NFL season =

American football season

Regular season
- Duration: September 3 – December 25, 2000

Playoffs
- Start date: December 30, 2000
- AFC Champions: Baltimore Ravens
- NFC Champions: New York Giants

Super Bowl XXXV
- Date: January 28, 2001
- Site: Raymond James Stadium, Tampa, Florida
- Champions: Baltimore Ravens

Pro Bowl
- Date: February 4, 2001
- Site: Aloha Stadium

AFC teams: West, Central, East
NFC teams: West, Central, East

The 2000 NFL season was the 81st regular season of the National Football League (NFL). The season ended with Super Bowl XXXV when the Baltimore Ravens defeated the New York Giants, 34–7, at Raymond James Stadium in Tampa, Florida.

Week 1 of the season reverted to Labor Day weekend in 2000. It would be the last NFL season to date to start on Labor Day weekend. It would also be the last time until 2015 that CBS televised the late afternoon games in Week 1, because both Week 1 of the NFL season and CBS's coverage of the U.S. Open tennis finals would take place on the same day beginning next season.

== Player movement ==
- July 24: The Carolina Panthers sign defensive end Reggie White.
- July 21: The Baltimore Ravens sign tight end Ben Coates.
- July 24: The San Diego Chargers sign linebacker Steve Tovar.
- July 25: The Carolina Panthers sign defensive end Eric Swann.
- July 26: The Seattle Seahawks sign wide receiver Sean Dawkins.
- July 28: The Chicago Bears sign kicker Michael Husted.

=== Trades ===
- July 11: The Green Bay Packers trade tight end Lawrence Hart to the New Orleans Saints for running back Marvin Powell.
- July 31: The Green Bay Packers trade quarterback Aaron Brooks and tight end Lamont Hall to the New Orleans Saints for linebacker K.D. Williams.

=== Draft ===
The 2000 NFL draft was held from April 15 to 16, 2000, at New York City's Theater at Madison Square Garden. With the first pick, the Cleveland Browns selected defensive end Courtney Brown from Pennsylvania State University. Taken by the New England Patriots with the 199th pick in the sixth round was Michigan quarterback Tom Brady. Tom Brady went on to win 3 NFL MVP awards, a record 7 Super Bowl titles and 5 Super Bowl MVP awards.

== Major rule changes ==
- In order to cut down on group celebrations, unsportsmanlike conduct penalties and fines will be assessed for celebrations by two or more players.
- Anyone wearing an eligible number (1 to 49 or 80 to 89) can play quarterback without having to first report to the referee before a play.
  - This rule change resulted in the increase of trick plays teams can employ on offense.
- The "Bert Emanuel" rule was implemented, stating that when making a catch and falling to the ground, the ball is allowed to touch the ground and still be considered a catch if the player maintains clear control of the ball.

== 2000 deaths ==
=== Pro Football Hall of Fame members ===
Tom Fears
Fears played 9 seasons as an end for the Los Angeles Rams and was inducted into the Hall of Fame in 1970. He was a 3-time NFL champion (1951, 1962, 1965), he was named First-team All-Pro in 1950, and was a member of the 1950s All-Decade Team. He was the first Mexican born player inducted into the Hall of Fame. He died January 4, aged 77
Derrick Thomas
Thomas played 11 seasons for the Kansas City Chiefs. He was a 6-time All-Pro selection (1st team 1990–1992, 2nd team 1993, 1994, 1996) and a 9-time Pro Bowl selection (1989–1997). He was named to the 1990s All-Decade Team. He owns NFL record for sacks in a game with 7, which he achieved in 1990. He was posthumously inducted into the Hall of Fame in 2009. He died February 8 of a pulmonary embolism, aged 33. He is the only player inducted into the Hall of Fame that died while still active in the NFL.
Tom Landry
Landry was the first head coach of the Dallas Cowboys. He won 2 Super Bowls VI and XII. He was inducted into the Hall of Fame in 1990. He died February 12, aged 75.

=== Active personnel ===
- Fred Lane, Indianapolis Colts running back, homicide, died on July 6.
- Eric Turner, Oakland Raiders safety, stomach cancer, died on May 28.

== Notable retirements ==
- Dan Marino
- Steve Young
- Paul Gruber
- Michael Irvin
- Corey Widmer
- Steve Atwater
- Daryl Johnston
- Mark Chmura
- Charles Haley
- Aaron Pierce
- Rae Carruth

== Regular season ==
=== Scheduling formula ===
Inter-conference
AFC East vs NFC Central
AFC Central vs NFC East
AFC West vs NFC West

Highlights of the 2000 season included:

- Thanksgiving: Two games were played on Thursday, November 23, featuring New England at Detroit and Minnesota at Dallas, with Detroit and Minnesota winning.

=== Final regular season standings ===
AFC East
	W	L	T	PCT	PF	PA	STK
^{(3)} Miami Dolphins	11	5	0	.688	323	226	W1
^{(6)} Indianapolis Colts	10	6	0	.625	429	326	W3
New York Jets	9	7	0	.563	321	321	L3
Buffalo Bills	8	8	0	.500	315	350	W1
New England Patriots	5	11	0	.313	276	338	L1

AFC Central
	W	L	T	PCT	PF	PA	STK
^{(1)} Tennessee Titans	13	3	0	.813	346	191	W4
^{(4)} Baltimore Ravens	12	4	0	.750	333	165	W7
Pittsburgh Steelers	9	7	0	.563	321	255	W2
Jacksonville Jaguars	7	9	0	.438	367	327	L2
Cincinnati Bengals	4	12	0	.250	185	359	L1
Cleveland Browns	3	13	0	.188	161	419	L5

AFC West
	W	L	T	PCT	PF	PA	STK
^{(2)} Oakland Raiders	12	4	0	.750	479	299	W1
^{(5)} Denver Broncos	11	5	0	.688	485	369	W1
Kansas City Chiefs	7	9	0	.438	355	354	L1
Seattle Seahawks	6	10	0	.375	320	405	L1
San Diego Chargers	1	15	0	.063	269	440	L4

NFC East
	W	L	T	PCT	PF	PA	STK
^{(1)} New York Giants	12	4	0	.750	328	246	W5
^{(4)} Philadelphia Eagles	11	5	0	.688	351	245	W2
Washington Redskins	8	8	0	.500	281	269	W1
Dallas Cowboys	5	11	0	.313	294	361	L2
Arizona Cardinals	3	13	0	.188	210	443	L7

NFC Central
	W	L	T	PCT	PF	PA	STK
^{(2)} Minnesota Vikings	11	5	0	.688	397	371	L3
^{(5)} Tampa Bay Buccaneers	10	6	0	.625	388	269	L1
Green Bay Packers	9	7	0	.563	353	323	W4
Detroit Lions	9	7	0	.563	307	307	L1
Chicago Bears	5	11	0	.313	216	355	W1

NFC West
	W	L	T	PCT	PF	PA	STK
^{(3)} New Orleans Saints	10	6	0	.625	354	305	L1
^{(6)} St. Louis Rams	10	6	0	.625	540	471	W1
Carolina Panthers	7	9	0	.438	310	310	L1
San Francisco 49ers	6	10	0	.375	388	422	L1
Atlanta Falcons	4	12	0	.250	252	413	W1

=== Tiebreakers ===
- Green Bay finished ahead of Detroit in the NFC Central based on better division record (5–3 to Lions' 3–5).
- New Orleans finished ahead of St. Louis in the NFC West based on better division record (7–1 to Rams' 5–3).
- Tampa Bay was the second NFC Wild Card based on head-to-head victory over St. Louis (1–0).

== Playoffs ==
Dec 31 – PSINet Stadium	Jan 7 – Adelphia Coliseum
5	Denver	3
4	Baltimore	24
4	Baltimore	21	Jan 14 – Network Associates Coliseum
1	Tennessee	10
AFC
Dec 30 – Pro Player Stadium	4	Baltimore	16
Jan 6 – Network Associates Coliseum
2	Oakland	3
6	Indianapolis	17	AFC Championship
3	Miami	0
3	Miami	23*	Jan 28 – Raymond James Stadium
2	Oakland	27
Wild-card round
Divisional round
Dec 30 – Louisiana Superdome	A4	Baltimore	34
Jan 6 – Hubert H. Humphrey Metrodome
N1	NY Giants	7
6	St. Louis	28	Super Bowl XXXV
3	New Orleans	16
3	New Orleans	31	Jan 14 – Giants Stadium
2	Minnesota	34
NFC
Dec 31 – Veterans Stadium	2	Minnesota	0
Jan 7 – Giants Stadium
1	NY Giants	41
5	Tampa Bay	3	NFC Championship
4	Philadelphia	10
4	Philadelphia	21
1	NY Giants	20

* Indicates overtime victory

== Milestones ==
The following teams and players set all-time NFL records during the season:

Record	Player/team	Date/opponent	Previous record holder
Most rushing yards gained, game	Corey Dillon, Cincinnati (278)	October 22, vs. Denver	Walter Payton, Chicago vs. Minnesota, November 20, 1977 (275)
Most pass receptions, game	Terrell Owens, San Francisco (20)	December 17, vs. Chicago	Tom Fears, L.A. Rams vs. Green Bay, December 3, 1950 (18)
Most points, career	Gary Anderson, Minnesota	October 22, vs. Buffalo	George Blanda 1949–1975 (2,002)
Most two-point conversions by a team, game	St. Louis (4)	October 15, vs. Atlanta	Tied by 2 teams (3)
Most yards gained by a team, season	St. Louis (7,075)	N/A	Miami, 1984 (6,936)
Most passing yards gained by a team, season	St. Louis (5,232)	N/A	Miami, 1984 (5,018)

== Statistical leaders ==
=== Team ===
Points scored	St. Louis Rams (540)
Total yards gained	St. Louis Rams (7,075)
Yards rushing	Oakland Raiders (2,470)
Yards passing	St. Louis Rams (5,232)
Fewest points allowed	Baltimore Ravens (165)
Fewest total yards allowed	Tennessee Titans (3,813)
Fewest rushing yards allowed	Baltimore Ravens (970)
Fewest passing yards allowed	Tennessee Titans (2,423)

=== Individual ===
Scoring	Marshall Faulk, St. Louis (160 points)
Touchdowns	Marshall Faulk, St. Louis (26 TDs)
Most field goals made	Matt Stover, Baltimore (35 FGs)
Rushing	Edgerrin James, Indianapolis (1,709 yards)
Passing yards	Peyton Manning, Indianapolis (4,413 yards)
Passing touchdowns	Daunte Culpepper, Minnesota and Peyton Manning, Indianapolis (33 TDs)
Receptions	Marvin Harrison, Indianapolis and Muhsin Muhammad, Carolina (102 catches)
Receiving yards	Torry Holt, St. Louis (1,635)
Receiving touchdowns	Randy Moss, Minnesota (15 touchdowns)
Punt returns	Jermaine Lewis, Baltimore (16.1 average yards)
Kickoff returns	Darrick Vaughn, Atlanta (27.7 average yards)
Interceptions	Darren Sharper, Green Bay (9)
Punting	Darren Bennett, San Diego (46.2 average yards)
Sacks	La'Roi Glover, New Orleans (17)

== Awards ==
Most Valuable Player	Marshall Faulk, running back, St. Louis
Coach of the Year	Jim Haslett, New Orleans
Offensive Player of the Year	Marshall Faulk, running back, St. Louis
Defensive Player of the Year	Ray Lewis, linebacker, Baltimore
Offensive Rookie of the Year	Mike Anderson, running back, Denver
Defensive Rookie of the Year	Brian Urlacher, linebacker, Chicago
NFL Comeback Player of the Year	Joe Johnson, defensive end, New Orleans
Walter Payton NFL Man of the Year	Jim Flanigan, defensive tackle, Chicago and Derrick Brooks, linebacker, Tampa Bay
Super Bowl most valuable player	Ray Lewis, linebacker, Baltimore

== Head coach/front office changes ==
=== Head coach ===
Offseason

- Dallas Cowboys – Dave Campo replaced Chan Gailey, who was fired after the 1999 season.
- Green Bay Packers – Mike Sherman replaced Ray Rhodes, who was fired after the 1999 season.
- Miami Dolphins – Dave Wannstedt replaced Jimmy Johnson, who retired after the 1999 season.
- New England Patriots – Bill Belichick replaced Pete Carroll, who was fired after the 1999 season. Belichick was hired by the New England Patriots shortly after he resigned from the Jets. Bill Parcells and the Jets claimed that Belichick was still under contract to the Jets, and demanded compensation from the Patriots. NFL Commissioner Paul Tagliabue agreed, and the Patriots gave the Jets a first-round draft pick in 2000 in exchange for the right to hire Belichick.
- New Orleans Saints – Jim Haslett replaced Mike Ditka, who was fired after the 1999 season.
- New York Jets – Al Groh replaced Bill Belichick, who replaced Bill Parcells, who retired to become the full-time General Manager after the 1999 season. Defensive coordinator Bill Belichick, the first choice to replace Parcells as head coach, resigned in order to take the Patriots job.
- St. Louis Rams – Mike Martz replaced Dick Vermeil, who retired after winning Super Bowl XXXIV.

In-season

- Cincinnati Bengals – Bruce Coslet resigned three games into the season and was replaced by defensive coordinator Dick LeBeau, who held the job through the 2002 season.
- Arizona Cardinals – Vince Tobin was fired seven games into the season and was replaced by defensive coordinator Dave McGinnis, who held the job through the 2003 season.

=== Front office ===
- Houston Texans – Charley Casserly was hired as the first executive vice president/GM of the expansion Texans on January 19th, 2000. The Texans would play their inaugural season two years later.
- Minnesota Vikings – Head coach Dennis Green took over as de facto general manager after Tim Connolly's resignation on January 24th, 2000.
- New Orleans Saints – Randy Mueller replaced Bill Kuharich, who was fired after the 1999 season.
- St. Louis Rams – Charley Armey replaced former head coach Dick Vermeil, who retired after winning Super Bowl XXXIV.
- Pittsburgh Steelers – Kevin Colbert replaced Tom Donahoe, who was fired after the 1999 season, as de facto general manager.
- New England Patriots – New head coach Bill Belichick replaced Bobby Grier as de facto general manager, as Belichick was given the final say on personnel matters. Grier left the Patriots after the 2000 NFL draft. Belichick split the duties typically held by a general manager on most other NFL teams with player personnel director Scott Pioli.
- San Diego Chargers – Director of player personnel Billy Devaney took the responsibility of player acquisitions after Bobby Beathard's retirement on April 25, 2000.

== Stadium changes ==
- The Cincinnati Bengals moved from Cinergy Field to Paul Brown Stadium, named after team founder Paul Brown
- The Seattle Seahawks began playing at Husky Stadium while the Kingdome was demolished and a new Seahawks stadium built in its place
- Giants Stadium's Astroturf was replaced with natural grass

== Uniform and logo changes ==
- The Baltimore Ravens introduced a new Ravens wordmark logo, a new Ravens shield logo was placed on the sleeve ends, and there was new pants stripping with the "B" logo on hips.
- The Kansas City Chiefs began wearing red pants with their white jerseys for first time since 1988.
- On May 27th 2000 The New England Patriots introduced new uniforms, darkening the shade of their blue from royal to nautical blue. The new white jerseys were worn with blue block numbers and blue pants.
- The New Orleans Saints updated their fleur-de-lis helmet logo to be a bit smaller but with a wider white and black outline. Also introduced was an alternative old gold logo. They also returned to wearing old gold pants with their white jerseys.
- On April 5th 2000 The New York Giants unveiled new uniforms. The blue jerseys were a modernized version of the team's design used in the 1950s. The white jerseys still retained elements of the 1980s design (such as the 1980s' blue collars and nameplates, and missing the 1950s' red sleeve stripes) but with red numbers like the 1950s version. Gray pants were worn with both the blue and white jerseys. The helmet also returned to featuring the lowercase "ny" logo, in addition to the TV numbers moving from the sleeve to the shoulder.
- The San Diego Chargers wore a patch on their uniforms commemorating the teams 40th anniversary, also had brought back their throwback powder blue uniforms for the first time since 1994 for one game.
- On April 13th 2000 The St. Louis Rams introduced new uniforms, darkening the shades of blue and gold to "New Century Blue" and "Millennium Gold". Among other modifications, the curling rams horns on the sleeves were replaced by a new logo featuring charging ram's head, in addition to the TV numbers moving from the sleeve to the shoulder.

== Television ==
This was the third year under the league's eight-year broadcast contracts with ABC, CBS, Fox, and ESPN to televise Monday Night Football, the AFC package, the NFC package, and Sunday Night Football, respectively.

ABC fired Boomer Esiason, reportedly because he and Al Michaels never got along in the MNF booth. ABC decided to go in a radical direction by hiring comedian Dennis Miller, along with Dan Fouts, to join Michaels.

Dick Enberg joined CBS, becoming the #2 play-by-play commentator, alongside Dan Dierdorf, while Verne Lundquist returned to call college football for CBS after week 2. Also, Mike Ditka joined The NFL Today as an analyst. Daryl Johnston joined CBS as a color commentator, with Kevin Harlan starting week 6 replacing Sam Wyche who underwent offseason vocal chord surgery as he called one game in week 2, having Todd Blackledge from The SEC on CBS (Week 1) and Randy Cross (Weeks 3-5) from The NFL Today fill in temporarily. Blackledge would also fill in for Phil Simms (week 2) with Greg Gumbel as Simms underwent an emergency appendectomy.
