= New Orleans Saints all-time roster =

1,436 players have appeared in at least one regular season or postseason game in the National Football League (NFL) for the New Orleans Saints since 1967. This list is accurate through the end of the 2025 NFL season.

== A ==
- Isa Abdul-Quddus
- Johnathan Abram
- Danny Abramowicz
- Dick Absher
- Tom Ackerman
- Michael Adams
- Montravius Adams
- Sam Adams Sr.
- Scott Adams
- Vashone Adams
- Paulson Adebo
- Margene Adkins
- Ink Aleaga
- Kwon Alexander
- Vincent Alexander
- Eric Allen
- James Allen
- Kenderick Allen
- Terry Allen
- Kiko Alonso
- Gerald Alphin
- Ugo Amadi
- Jonathan Amaya
- Ashley Ambrose
- Morten Andersen
- Dick Anderson
- Gary Anderson
- James Anderson
- Jesse Anderson
- Josh Andrews
- Sheldon Andrus
- Stephone Anthony
- Tyrone Anthony
- Alex Anzalone
- Eli Apple
- Ben Archibald
- Alex Armah
- Terron Armstead
- Ray-Ray Armstrong
- Dan Arnold
- Stanley Arnoux
- Adrian Arrington
- K. C. Asiodu
- Bert Askson
- Pete Athas
- Doug Atkins
- Gene Atkins
- Cliff Austin
- Kevin Austin
- Remi Ayodele

== B ==
- Johnson Bademosi
- Edwin Baker
- Kawaan Baker
- Melvin Baker
- Tony Baker
- Marcus Ball
- Chris Banjo
- Gordon Banks
- Kelvin Banks Jr.
- Chris Barclay
- Darian Barnes
- Derrick Barnes
- Tavaris Barnes
- Tommy Barnhardt
- Malcolm Barnwell
- Sam Barrington
- Tom Barrington
- Don Bass
- Mario Bates
- Steve Baumgartner
- Zack Baun
- John Beasley
- Brett Bech
- Carlos Bell
- Mike Bell
- Ronnie Bell
- Vonn Bell
- Jay Bellamy
- Wes Bender
- Caleb Benenoch
- Eno Benjamin
- Guy Benjamin
- Barry Bennett
- Monte Bennett
- Cliff Benson
- LeCharles Bentley
- Mitch Berger
- Ladell Betts
- Dwight Beverly
- Vince Biegel
- Adam Bighill
- Julian Blackmon
- Jeff Blake
- Tom Blanchard
- Dwaine Board
- Colby Bockwoldt
- Jim Boeke
- Ian Book
- Fred Booker
- Chris Bordano
- Ken Bordelon
- Wade Bosarge
- Kirk Botkin
- Todd Bouman
- Lynn Bowden Jr.
- Jerry Boyarsky
- Greg Boyd
- Khristian Boyd
- Greg Boykin
- McKinley Boykin
- Millard Bradford
- Jamaal Branch
- Robert Brannon
- Delvin Breaux
- Drew Brees
- Hoby Brenner
- Bryan Bresee
- Johnny Brewer
- Teddy Bridgewater
- Doug Brien
- Stan Brock
- Jay Bromley
- Josiah Bronson
- Aaron Brooks
- Vernon Broughton
- Willie Broughton
- Alex Brown
- Charles Brown
- Charlie Brown
- Derek Brown
- Fakhir Brown
- Jammal Brown
- Malcom Brown
- Ray Brown
- Robert Brown
- Brandon Browner
- Mark Brunell
- Tony Bryant
- Mike Buck
- Vince Buck
- Jonathan Bullard
- Josh Bullocks
- Brodrick Bunkley
- Don Burchfield
- Terrell Burgess
- Vern Burke
- Jackie Burkett
- Ed Burns
- Bo Burris
- Ken Burrough
- Larry Burton
- Michael Burton
- Rafael Bush
- Reggie Bush
- Jermon Bushrod
- Nate Bussey
- Bill Butler
- Skip Butler
- Israel Byrd
- Jairus Byrd

== C ==
- Travaris Cadet
- Taveze Calhoun
- Marquez Callaway
- Greg Camarillo
- Earl Campbell
- Joe Campbell
- Mark Campbell
- James Campen
- Chris Canty
- Warren Capone
- John Carney
- James Carpenter
- Austin Carr
- Chris Carr
- Derek Carr
- Tom Carr
- Herman Carroll
- Travis Carroll
- Wesley Carroll
- Dale Carter
- David Carter
- Ki-Jana Carter
- Tim Carter
- Jonathan Casillas
- Craig Cassady
- Rich Caster
- Rusty Chambers
- Wes Chandler
- Clarence Chapman
- Gil Chapman
- Jeff Charleston
- Martin Chase
- Je'Rod Cherry
- Henry Childs
- Ron Childs
- Larry Cipa
- Kendrick Clancy
- Will Clapp
- Bruce Clark
- Danny Clark
- Kelvin Clark
- Robert Clark
- Vinnie Clark
- Phil Clarke
- Willie Clay
- Cam Cleeland
- Charlie Clemons
- Bill Cody
- Mike Cofer
- Dan Colchico
- Brandon Coleman
- Don Coleman
- Kurt Coleman
- Jed Collins
- Kerry Collins
- Larry Collins
- Wayne Colman
- Marques Colston
- Chuck Commiskey
- Albert Connell
- Ryan Connelly
- Darion Conner
- Bill Contz
- Ernie Conwell
- Jared Cook
- Toi Cook
- Brandin Cooks
- Larry Coombs
- Josh Cooper
- Richard Cooper
- Terrance Copper
- Lou Cordileone
- Olie Cordill
- Bruce Cortez
- Chad Cota
- Bryan Cox
- Jason Craft
- Mike Crangle
- Aaron Craver
- Keyuo Craver
- Ken Crawley
- Bob Creech
- Chuck Crist
- Sylvester Croom
- Ron Crosby
- Billy Cundiff
- Carl Cunningham
- Gary Cuozzo

== D ==
- Andy Dalton
- Oakley Dalton
- Chase Daniel
- Cameron Dantzler
- Marcus Davenport
- Jason David
- A. J. Davis
- Akeem Davis
- Bob Davis
- Dave Davis
- Demario Davis
- Dick Davis
- Don Davis
- Isaac Davis
- Michael Davis
- Norman Davis
- Ted Davis
- Todd Davis
- Travis Davis
- Troy Davis
- Wyatt Davis
- Tyeler Davison
- Sean Dawkins
- Lawrence Dawsey
- Stacey Dawsey
- Keyunta Dawson
- Brian de la Puente
- Brandon Deaderick
- Joe DeForest
- Jack DeGrenier
- Jack Del Rio
- Jake Delhomme
- Curtis DeLoatch
- Tom Dempsey
- Lee DeRamus
- Jimmy DeRatt
- Glenn Derby
- John Didion
- Fadil Diggs
- Darnell Dinkins
- Brian Dixon
- Ernest Dixon
- Ronnie Dixon
- Conrad Dobler
- Al Dodd
- Jim Dombrowski
- Tom Donovan
- Andy Dorris
- John Douglas
- Marques Douglas
- Bobby Douglass
- Marcus Dowdell
- Andrew Dowell
- Tyronne Drakeford
- Justin Drescher
- Kenny Duckett
- Jon Dumbauld
- Jo-Lonn Dunbar
- Jubilee Dunbar
- Karl Dunbar
- Vaughn Dunbar
- Yasir Durant
- Charlie Durkee
- Bill Dusenbery

== E ==
- Quinn Early
- Nick Easton
- Kyle Eckel
- Kasim Edebali
- Brad Edelman
- Trey Edmunds
- Kelvin Edwards
- Clyde Edwards-Helaire
- Mario Edwards Jr.
- Dannell Ellerbe
- Ted Elliott
- Tony Elliott
- Sedrick Ellis
- Kaden Elliss
- Frank Emanuel
- Tory Epps
- Cameron Erving
- Russell Erxleben
- Larry Estes
- Audric Estime
- Kaleb Eulls
- Chuck Evans
- Heath Evans
- Jahri Evans
- Justin Evans
- Troy Evans
- Jim Everett

== F ==
- Julian Fagan
- Jeff Faine
- Nick Fairley
- Chris Farasopoulos
- Hap Farber
- John Farquhar
- Greg Fassitt
- Jeff Faulkner
- Joe Federspiel
- Happy Feller
- Eric Felton
- James Fenderson
- Gill Fenerty
- James Ferguson
- Paul Fersen
- Ross Fichtner
- Brandon Fields
- DaMarcus Fields
- Jitter Fields
- Mark Fields
- Bill Fifer
- Sharif Finch
- Alfred Fincher
- Mike Fink
- Roger Finnie
- Jim Flanigan, Sr.
- Coby Fleener
- Moise Fokou
- Spencer Folau
- Jerry Fontenot
- Kai Forbath
- Henry Ford
- James Ford
- Jaylan Ford
- Brian Forde
- Luke Fortner
- Isaiah Foskey
- Glenn Foster
- John Fourcade
- Keith Fourcade
- Bennie Fowler
- Bobby Fowler
- Eric Frampton
- Aubrayo Franklin
- P.J. Franklin
- Todd Franz
- Jim Fraser
- Paul Frazier
- Terrence Frederick
- Reggie Freeman
- Jonathan Freeny
- Toni Fritsch
- Taliese Fuaga
- Scott Fujita
- Johnny Fuller
- John Fullington
- Mike Fultz

== G ==
- Hokie Gajan
- Tony Galbreath
- Junior Galette
- Kendall Gammon
- Wayne Gandy
- Jim Garcia
- Max Garcia
- Talman Gardner
- C. J. Gardner-Johnson
- Len Garrett
- Russell Gary
- Randall Gay
- Willie Gay
- Jumpy Geathers
- Ronnie Ghent
- Donnie Gibbs
- Antonio Gibson
- Daren Gilbert
- John Gilliam
- Blake Gillikin
- Mike Gillislee
- John Gilmore
- Ted Ginn Jr.
- Matt Giordano
- Ryan Glasgow
- Steve Gleason
- Aaron Glenn
- Vencie Glenn
- Andrew Glover
- La'Roi Glover
- Davon Godchaux
- Robert Goff
- Dan Goich
- Eugene Goodlow
- Jonathan Goodwin
- Darren Gottschalk
- Toby Gowin
- Ben Graham
- Daniel Graham
- Jimmy Graham
- Shayne Graham
- T. J. Graham
- Martín Gramática
- Carl Granderson
- Hoyle Granger
- Charles Grant
- Cie Grant
- David Gray
- J. T. Gray
- Kevin Gray
- Leon Gray
- Mel Gray
- Art Green
- Howard Green
- Paul Green
- Skyler Green
- T. J. Green
- Victor Green
- Ethan Greenidge
- Donovan Greer
- Jabari Greer
- Ted Gregory
- Bob Gresham
- Garrett Griffin
- DeJuan Groce
- Elois Grooms
- Earl Gros
- Lee Gross
- Jeff Groth
- Ben Grubbs
- Blake Grupe
- Terry Guess
- Eric Guliford
- Obum Gwacham
- Ross Gwinn

== H ==
- Jake Haener
- Az-Zahir Hakim
- Mike Halapin
- Grant Haley
- Korey Hall
- Lamont Hall
- Tom Hall
- Willie Hall
- Andy Hamilton
- Lynell Hamilton
- Woodrow Hamilton
- Uhuru Hamiter
- Saquan Hampton
- Norman Hand
- Jim Hanna
- Brian Hansen
- Chase Hansen
- Parys Haralson
- Justin Hardee
- Greg Harding
- Larry Hardy
- Edd Hargett
- Anthony Hargrove
- Deveron Harper
- Roman Harper
- Billy Harris
- Bryce Harris
- Chris Harris, Jr.
- Corey Harris
- De'Vante Harris
- Erik Harris
- Herbert Harris
- Ike Harris
- Rod Harris
- Will Harris
- Vic Harrison
- Ben Hart
- Jeff Hart
- Tommy Hart
- Garrett Hartley
- Deonte Harty
- George Harvey
- Richard Harvey (born 1945)
- Richard Harvey (born 1966)
- Andre Hastings
- Kevin Haverdink
- Sam Havrilak
- David Hawthorne
- Michael Hawthorne
- Matthew Hayball
- Billie Hayes
- Mercury Hayes
- James Haynes
- Michael Haynes
- Major Hazelton
- Jeff Heath
- Bobby Hebert
- Lou Hedley
- Jack Heflin
- Jimmy Heidel
- Devery Henderson
- Othello Henderson
- Trey Hendrickson
- Ricky Henry
- Kyle Hergel
- Tre Herndon
- Will Herring
- Don Herrmann
- Jimmy Hester
- Ray Hester
- Chris Hewitt
- Craig Heyward
- Akiem Hicks
- Michael Higgins
- Tim Hightower
- Jay Hilgenberg
- Joel Hilgenberg
- John Hill
- Josh Hill
- Lonzell Hill
- Randal Hill
- Taysom Hill
- Dalton Hilliard
- Keno Hills
- Tony Hills
- Zach Hilton
- Glen Ray Hines
- Nyheim Hines
- Terry Hoage
- Bill Hobbs
- Daryl Hobbs
- Billy Joe Hobert
- Zach Hocker
- Milford Hodge
- Sedrick Hodge
- Gerald Hodges
- Tommy Hodson
- Chris Hogan
- Krishawn Hogan
- Curtis Holden
- Sam Holden
- Dallin Holker
- Montrae Holland
- Hugo Hollas
- Stan Holloway
- Jack Holmes
- Jalyn Holmes
- Terrence Holt
- J.P. Holtz
- Michael Hoomanawanui
- Joe Horn
- Derrick Hoskins
- Kevin Houser
- Walt Housman
- Darren Howard
- Gene Howard
- Jordan Howard
- Reggie Howard
- Jordan Howden
- Delles Howell
- Braxton Hoyett
- John Huard
- David A. Hubbard
- Khaleke Hudson
- Nat Hudson
- Albert Huggins
- John Hughes
- Pat Hughes
- Tyrone Hughes
- Evan Hull
- Ramon Humber
- Lil'Jordan Humphrey
- Tory Humphrey
- Kevin Hunt
- Margus Hunt
- Earnest Hunter
- Kendall Hunter
- Bill Hurley
- James Hurst
- Fred Hyatt

== I ==
- Jake Ingram
- Kevin Ingram
- Mark Ingram II
- Ken Irvin
- Qadry Ismail
- Steve Israel
- Chris Ivory

== J ==
- D'Marco Jackson
- Ernie Jackson
- Grady Jackson
- Greg Jackson
- Jermaine Jackson
- Jonathan Jackson
- Rickey Jackson
- Willie Jackson
- Harry Jacobs
- Kendyl Jacox
- Van Jakes
- Phillip James
- Stanley Jean-Baptiste
- Garland Jean-Batiste
- Shemar Jean-Charles
- Haywood Jeffires
- Dameian Jeffries
- Janoris Jenkins
- John Jenkins
- Malcolm Jenkins
- Stanford Jennings
- Paul Jetton
- Alonzo Johnson
- Austin Johnson
- Benny Johnson
- Bobby Johnson
- Brian Johnson
- Carl Johnson
- David Johnson
- Dirk Johnson
- Earl Johnson
- Eric Johnson
- George Johnson
- J.R. Johnson
- Joe Johnson
- John Johnson
- Juwan Johnson
- Lonnie Johnson Jr.
- Nate Johnson
- Tom Johnson
- Tony Johnson
- Trevor Johnson
- Tyrone Johnson
- Undra Johnson
- Vaughan Johnson
- Walter Johnson
- Andrew Jones
- Brian Jones
- Clarence Jones
- Don Jones
- Donta Jones
- Ernest Jones
- Herana-Daze Jones
- Jamal Jones
- Jerry Jones
- J. J. Jones
- Julius Jones
- Kim Jones
- Mike Jones
- Ray Jones
- Reggie Jones
- Seantavius Jones
- Selwyn Jones
- Tebucky Jones
- Tony Jones Jr.
- Velus Jones Jr.
- Buford Jordan
- Cameron Jordan
- Jimmy Jordan
- Keith Joseph
- Tom Jurich

== K ==
- Kevin Kaesviharn
- Alvin Kamara
- Ken Kaplan
- Mike Karney
- John Kasay
- Jim Kearney
- Curtis Keaton
- Senio Kelemete
- Leslie Kelley
- Derrick Kelly II
- Mike Kelly
- Rob Kelly
- Florian Kempf
- Derek Kennard
- Eddie Kennison
- Shiloh Keo
- Lewis Kidd
- Hau'oli Kikaha
- Billy Kilmer
- Elbert Kimbrough
- Ed King
- Mitch King
- Rick Kingrea
- Keith Kirkwood
- A. J. Klein
- Alan Kline
- Greg Knafelc
- Roger Knight
- Sammy Knight
- Shawn Knight
- Kyle Knox
- Joe Kohlbrand
- David Kopay
- Steve Korte
- Jim Kovach
- Tanoh Kpassagnon
- Tommy Kraemer
- Kent Kramer
- Tommy Kramer
- Olin Kreutz
- John Krimm
- Kai Kroeger
- Paul Kruger
- Lucas Krull
- John Kuhn
- Jake Kupp
- Bob Kuziel
- Jason Kyle

== L ==
- Dave Lafary
- Morris LaGrand
- Antwan Lake
- Forrest Lamp
- Jake Lampman
- Jarvis Landry
- Phil LaPorta
- Daniel Lasco
- Marshon Lattimore
- Babe Laufenberg
- James Laurinaitis
- Nate Lawrie
- Odell Lawson
- Bill Leach
- Scott Leach
- Nick Leckey
- Bivian Lee
- Carl Lee
- Mark Lee
- Tyrone Legette
- Brad Leggett
- Earl Leggett
- Matt Lehr
- Rodney Leisle
- Tim Lelito
- Shane Lemieux
- Mike Lemon
- Brian Leonard
- Eku Leota
- Josh LeRibeus
- Derrick Lewis
- Gary Lewis (born 1942)
- Gary Lewis (born 1961)
- Keenan Lewis
- Marvin Lewis
- Michael Lewis
- Reggie Lewis
- Rodney Lewis
- Tommylee Lewis
- John Leypoldt
- Errol Linden
- Dale Lindsey
- Zach Line
- Toni Linhart
- Louis Lipps
- Earl Little
- Cory Littleton
- Andy Livingston
- Greg Loberg
- Mitchell Loewen
- Curtis Lofton
- Obert Logan
- Chip Lohmiller
- Dave Long
- Joe Don Looney
- Tony Lorick
- Erik Lorig
- Cornelius Lucas
- Sean Lumpkin
- Henry Lusk
- Wil Lutz
- Dicky Lyons

== M ==
- Cedric Mack
- Elbert Mack
- Milton Mack
- Brett Maher
- Marcus Mailei
- Chris Manhertz
- Archie Manning
- Justin March
- Ken Marchiol
- Olindo Mare
- Doug Marrone
- Jim Marsalis
- James Marshall
- Chris Martin
- Dee Martin
- Eric Martin
- Jamie Martin
- Wayne Martin
- Rich Martini
- Robert Massey
- Moliki Matavao
- Tyrann Mathieu
- Kevin Mathis
- Reggie Mathis
- Henry Matthews
- Arthur Maulet
- Andy Maurer
- Michael Mauti
- Rich Mauti
- Brett Maxie
- Alvin Maxson
- Jermane Mayberry
- Marcus Maye
- Michael Mayes
- Rueben Mayes
- Fred McAfee
- Chris McAlister
- Deuce McAllister
- Turk McBride
- Chris McCain
- Don McCall
- Bill McClard
- J. J. McCleskey
- Andy McCollum
- Dave McCormick
- Luke McCown
- Erik McCoy
- Larry McCoy
- Matt McCoy
- Fred McCrary
- Bobby McCray
- Earl McCullouch
- Tony McDaniel
- Dexter McDougle
- Wane McGarity
- Ralph McGill
- Mike McGlynn
- Connor McGovern
- Corey McIntyre
- Mike McKenzie
- Ronald McKinnon
- Kool-Aid McKinstry
- Dana McLemore
- Wynton McManis
- Mark McMillian
- Rod McNeill
- Tom McNeill
- Leon McQuay
- Pat McQuistan
- Robert Meachem
- Bub Means
- Taylor Mehlhaff
- Shad Meier
- Terrence Melton
- Cameron Meredith
- Guido Merkens
- Jim Merlo
- Casey Merrill
- Kirk Merritt
- Mark Meseroll
- Darren Mickell
- Rick Middleton
- Steve Mike-Mayer
- Billy Miller
- Jordan Miller
- Junior Miller
- Kendre Miller
- Les Miller
- Mike Miller
- Jordan Mills
- Sam Mills
- Brian Milne
- Jordan Mims
- Lincoln Minor
- Derrell Mitchell
- Kawika Mitchell
- Keith Mitchell
- Kevin Mitchell
- Marvin Mitchell
- Mel Mitchell
- Zaire Mitchell-Paden
- Mike Mohamed
- Alex Molden
- Marv Montgomery
- Monty Montgomery
- Ty Montgomery
- Doug Mooers
- Derland Moore
- Eric Moore
- Jerald Moore
- Jerry Moore
- Lance Moore
- Reynaud Moore
- Sterling Moore
- John Mooring
- Foster Moreau
- Joe Morgan
- Mike Morgan
- Chris Morris
- Don Morrison
- Bobby Morse
- Thomas Morstead
- Chad Morton
- Al-Quadin Muhammad
- Chuck Muncie
- Jerome Murphy
- Kyle Murphy
- Marcus Murphy
- Latavius Murray
- Brad Muster
- PJ Mustipher
- Tom Myers
- DeShone Myles

== N ==
- Chris Naeole
- Rob Nairne
- Devin Neal
- Lorenzo Neal
- Richard Neal
- Derrick Ned
- Jerico Nelson
- Jamar Nesbit
- Elijah Nevett
- Robert Newkirk
- Bob Newland
- Anthony Newman
- Pat Newman
- Billy Newsome
- Richard Newsome
- Derek Newton
- Calvin Nicholson
- Carl Nicks
- Rob Ninkovich
- Jim Ninowski
- Moran Norris
- Craig Novitsky
- Doug Nussmeier
- Vic Nyvall

== O ==
- Ray Ogden
- Alex Okafor
- Michael Ola
- Chris Olave
- Chris Oldham
- Eric Olsen
- Patrick Omameh
- Ken O'Neal
- Steve O'Neal
- David Onyemata
- Toben Opurum
- Anfernee Orji
- Buck Ortega
- Ricky Ortiz
- Jim Otis
- Louis Oubre
- Artie Owens
- Chris Owens
- Joe Owens
- John Owens
- Tinker Owens
- Devine Ozigbo

== P ==
- Shane Pahukoa
- Glenn Pakulak
- Dick Palmer
- Emile Palmer
- Joel Parker
- Steve Parker
- Cody Parkey
- Dave Parks
- David Parry
- Rick Partridge
- Jerome Pathon
- Johnny Patrick
- Lucas Patrick
- David Patten
- Mark Pattison
- Whitney Paul
- Rico Payton
- Andrus Peat
- Scott Pelluer
- Trevor Penning
- Petey Perot
- Brett Perriman
- A. T. Perry
- Darren Perry
- Vernon Perry
- Wilmont Perry
- Adrian Peterson
- Rob Petitti
- Stan Petry
- Dante Pettis
- Jess Phillips
- John Phillips
- Kenny Phillips
- Kim Phillips
- Kyle Phillips
- Dino Philyaw
- Jason Pierre-Paul
- Jim Pietrzak
- Julian Pittman
- Elijah Pitts
- Ray Poage
- Johnnie Poe
- Bob Pollard
- Keith Poole
- Nate Poole
- Tauren Poole
- Chris Port
- Rufus Porter
- Tracy Porter
- Marvin Powell
- Ronald Powell
- Steve Preece
- Adam Prentice
- DeMario Pressley
- Elex Price
- Marcus Price
- Pierson Prioleau
- Joe Profit
- Remi Prudhomme

== R ==
- David Rackley
- Dillon Radunz
- Ryan Ramczyk
- Nate Ramsey
- Steve Ramsey
- Sheldon Rankins
- Walter Rasby
- Rocky Rasley
- Spencer Rattler
- Ricky Ray
- Ken Reaves
- Rusty Rebowe
- Glen Redd
- Kevin Reddick
- Chris Reed
- Jake Reed
- Don Reese
- Justin Reid
- Chris Reis
- Mike Rengel
- Tutan Reyes
- Steve Rhem
- Benny Ricardo
- Floyd Rice
- Asim Richards
- Bobby Richardson
- Jay Richardson
- Mike Richey
- John Ridgeway III
- Preston Riley
- Quincy Riley
- Victor Riley
- Christian Ringo
- Tim Riordan
- Ray Rissmiller
- Malcolm Roach
- Carl Roaches
- Willie Roaf
- Austin Robbins
- Walter Roberts
- Craig Robertson
- Craig Robinson
- Josh Robinson
- Khiry Robinson
- Patrick Robinson
- Virgil Robinson
- William Robinson
- Bradley Roby
- Courtney Roby
- Jeff Rodenberger
- Derrick Rodgers
- Bill Roe
- George Rogers
- Jimmy Rogers
- Shaun Rogers
- Steve Rogers
- Aldrick Rosas
- George Rose
- Scott Ross
- Jim Rourke
- Tom Roussel
- Dave Rowe
- Mark Royals
- Orlando Ruff
- Cesar Ruiz
- Chris Rumph
- KeiVarae Russell
- Barrett Ruud
- Sean Ryan
- Paul Ryczek

== S ==
- Pio Sagapolutele
- Pat Saindon
- Nick Saldiveri
- Bill Sandeman
- Emmanuel Sanders
- Scott Sanderson
- Jamarca Sanford
- Jonas Sanker
- Bill Saul
- Jalen Saunders
- Khalen Saunders
- Josh Savage
- Nicky Savoie
- Greg Scales
- Joe Scarpati
- Roy Schmidt
- Terry Schmidt
- Adam Schreiber
- Randy Schultz
- Kurt Schumacher
- Don Schwartz
- Brian Schweda
- Bobby Scott
- Bryan Scott
- Lindsay Scott
- Malcolm Scott
- Paul Seal
- Nephi Sewell
- Siddeeq Shabazz
- Rashid Shaheed
- Scott Shanle
- Darren Sharper
- Bob Shaw
- Derrick Shepard
- Nathan Shepherd
- William Sherman
- John Shinners
- Jeremy Shockey
- Tyler Shough
- Heath Shuler
- Don Shy
- Trevor Siemian
- Ricky Siglar
- Brian Simmons
- Dave Simmons
- Jerry Simmons
- Michael Simmons
- Mark Simoneau
- Ed Simonini
- Torricelli Simpkins
- Chuck Slaughter
- T. J. Slaughter
- David Sloan
- Scott Slutzker
- Torrance Small
- Joel Smeenge
- Antowain Smith
- Brady Smith
- Cedric Smith
- Darrin Smith
- Dwight Smith
- Irv Smith Sr.
- Kenny Smith
- Lamar Smith
- Royce Smith
- Shaun Smith
- Terrelle Smith
- Tre'Quan Smith
- Vinson Smith
- Will Smith
- Charlie Smyth
- Willie Snead
- Olaniyi Sobomehin
- Daniel Sorensen
- Ronnie Lee South
- Ernest Spears
- Jimmy Spencer
- Mo Spencer
- C. J. Spiller
- Mike Spivey
- Darren Sproles
- Ken Stabler
- Dave Stachelski
- Isaiah Stalbird
- Donté Stallworth
- Taylor Stallworth
- Israel Stanley
- Montavious Stanley
- Scott Stauch
- Equanimeous St. Brown
- Aaron Stecker
- Greg Stemrick
- Howard Stevens
- Jimmy Stewart
- Monty Stickles
- Terry Stieve
- Kenny Stills
- Jon Stinchcomb
- Thomas Stincic
- Fred Stokes
- Jack Stoll
- Mike Stonebreaker
- Steve Stonebreaker
- Omar Stoutmire
- Tommie Stowers
- Mike Strachan
- Eli Strand
- Kentavius Street
- Zach Strief
- Jim Strong
- William Strong
- Nate Stupar
- Jerry Sturm
- Fred Sturt
- Danny Stutsman
- Johnathan Sullivan
- Ty Summers
- Vinnie Sunseri
- Doug Sutherland
- Jon Sutton
- Reggie Sutton
- Damian Swann
- D. J. Swearinger
- Karl Sweetan
- Rod Sweeting
- Pat Swilling
- Clovis Swinney
- Pat Swoopes
- Rich Szaro
- Dave Szymakowski

== T ==
- Don Talbert
- Darryl Tapp
- Brandon Tate
- Alontae Taylor
- Derrick Taylor
- J. T. Taylor
- Jim Taylor
- Keith Taylor
- Mike Taylor
- Roderic Teamer
- Matt Tennant
- Manti Te'o
- Daryl Terrell
- Corey Terry
- Jim Thaxton
- Anthony Thomas
- Curtland Thomas
- David Thomas
- Fred Thomas
- Henry Thomas
- Hollis Thomas
- Joe Thomas
- Joey Thomas
- Michael Thomas
- Pierre Thomas
- Speedy Thomas
- Aundra Thompson
- Bennie Thompson
- Bobby Thompson
- Bryce Thompson
- Dave Thompson
- Don Thorp
- Calvin Throckmorton
- Junior Thurman
- John Tice
- Mike Tilleman
- Faddie Tillman
- Mason Tipton
- Richard Todd
- Alvin Toles
- Billy Joe Tolliver
- Cameron Tom
- Jared Tomich
- Nick Toon
- Leigh Torrence
- Samori Toure
- Darrel Toussaint
- Willie Townes
- Steve Trapilo
- Adam Trautman
- Desmond Trufant
- Jason Trusnik
- Xavier Truss
- Winfred Tubbs
- Willie Tullis
- Kyle Turley
- Renaldo Turnbull
- Floyd Turner
- Landon Turner
- Payton Turner
- Shy Tuttle
- Gunnard Twyner
- Toussaint Tyler

== U ==
- Oli Udoh
- Jeff Uhlenhake
- Max Unger

== V ==
- Kenny Vaccaro
- Marquez Valdes-Scantling
- Skip Vanderbundt
- Jason Vander Laan
- Phil Vandersea
- Nick Vannett
- Devaughn Vele
- Jim Van Wagner
- Jimmy Verdon
- Mike Verstegen
- Kendal Vickers
- Jonathan Vilma
- Lawrence Virgil

== W ==
- Trevin Wade
- Frank Wainright
- Dwight Walker
- Jeff Walker
- Mike Walker
- Tyrunn Walker
- Wesley Walls
- Steve Walsh
- Carl Ward
- Chris Ward
- Phillip Ward
- Larry Warford
- Ron Warner
- Frank Warren
- Pierre Warren
- Dave Washington
- Dwayne Washington
- Mickey Washington
- Anthony Waters
- Mike Waters
- Ben Watson
- Courtney Watson
- John Watson
- Frank Wattelet
- Dave Waymer
- Fred Weary
- Steve Weatherford
- Cephus Weatherspoon
- B. W. Webb
- Ron Weissenhofer
- Claxton Welch
- Treyton Welch
- Joe Wendryhoski
- Pete Werner
- Ethan Westbrooks
- Greg Westbrooks
- Austin Wheatley
- Ernie Wheelwright
- Creston Whitaker
- Corey White
- Kevin White
- Willie Whitehead
- Dave Whitsell
- Fred Whittingham
- Ricky Whittle
- Tom Wickert
- Bob Wicks
- Josh Wilcox
- Jimmy Wilkerson
- Jim Wilks
- Boo Williams
- Brian Williams
- Brooks Williams
- Del Williams
- Jamaal Williams
- James Williams
- Joe Williams
- John Williams
- Jonah Williams
- Jonathan Williams
- Kevin Williams
- Larry Williams
- Marcus Williams
- Melvin Williams
- P. J. Williams
- Ralph Williams
- Richard Williams
- Ricky Williams
- Wally Williams
- Willie Williams
- Donald Willis
- Leonard Willis
- Klaus Wilmsmeyer
- Cedrick Wilson Jr.
- Dave Wilson
- Jerry Wilson
- Kyle Wilson
- Martez Wilson
- Ray Wilson
- Robert Wilson
- Tim Wilson
- Troy Wilson
- Wade Wilson
- Wayne Wilson
- Jeff Winans
- Doug Winslow
- George Winslow
- DeMond Winston
- Dennis Winston
- Easop Winston
- Jameis Winston
- Wimpy Winther
- Scott Woerner
- Ethan Wolf
- Gary Wood
- John Wood
- Zach Wood
- Robert Woods
- Marv Woodson
- Barry Word
- Rejzohn Wright
- Danny Wuerffel
- Doug Wyatt
- DeShawn Wynn
- Renaldo Wynn

== Y ==
- Garo Yepremian
- Isaac Yiadom
- Bob Young
- Brian Young
- Chase Young
- Kevin Young
- Landon Young
- Tyrone Young
- Usama Young
- George Youngblood

== Z ==
- Emanuel Zanders
- Ray Zellars
- Zach Zenner
- Anthony Zettel
- Jabari Zuniga
