= 1967 New Orleans Saints season =

NFL team 1st season

- Owner: John Mecom Jr.
- General manager: Bert Rose
- Head coach: Tom Fears
- Home stadium: Tulane Stadium

Results
- Record: 3–11
- Division place: 4th Capitol
- League place: 15th
- Playoffs: Did not qualify
- All-Pros: Dave Whitsell (2nd team)
- Pro Bowlers: Dave Whitsell
- Team MVP: Dave Whitsell
- Team ROY: Danny Abramowicz

The 1967 New Orleans Saints season was the inaugural season for the franchise. The team went 3–11, finishing in last place in the four-team NFL Eastern Conference Capitol Division.

== Offseason ==
=== Expansion draft ===
The Saints made a splash in the expansion draft by selecting Green Bay Packers running back Paul Hornung. Lombardi was distraught when the Saints selected Hornung in the draft. In later years, Hornung revealed that he spoke to Saints coach Tom Fears prior to the draft. Fears was a former assistant in Green Bay and Fears felt that Hornung would help sell tickets in New Orleans. Several weeks later, the Saints also signed Packers running back Jim Taylor, a native of Baton Rouge and an All-American at LSU. Taylor had felt underpaid and under-appreciated under Lombardi. An examination at the Scripps Clinic in California found the severing of the fifth, sixth, and seventh vertebrae, and damaged nerve roots in the spinal cord of Hornung. It was decided that Hornung would retire and he never played a game for the Saints.

=== NFL draft ===
The Saints committed a colossal blunder by trading the first overall selection to the Baltimore Colts for Gary Cuozzo, the backup quarterback to Johnny Unitas. Cuozzo began the season as the Saints' starter, but lost the job to expansion draftee Billy Kilmer. After the season, Cuozzo was traded to the Minnesota Vikings in early 1968.

Baltimore selected Michigan State All-America defensive end Bubba Smith with the first pick; he became a star for the Colts, starting at left end in Super Bowls III and V.

1967 New Orleans Saints draft
Round	Pick	Player	Position	College	Notes
1	1	–	–	–	Selection traded to Baltimore Colts
1	26	Les Kelley	HB	Alabama	
2	27	Bo Burris	QB-S	Houston	
2	52	John Gilliam *	FL	South Carolina State	
2	53	Dave Rowe	OT	Penn State	
3	54	–	–	–	Selection traded to Baltimore Colts
3	79	Del Williams	C-G	Florida State	
3	80	Ben Hart	SE	Oklahoma	
4	81	Ron Widby *	P	Tennessee	
4	106	Bill Carr	C	Florida	
4	107	Tom Stangle	E	Dayton	
5	108	Don McCall	HB	Southern California	
5	133	John Douglas	DB	Texas Southern	
6	134	George Harvey	G	Kansas	
6	159	Bo Wood	LB	North Carolina	
7	160	Gary Hertzog	G	Willamette	
7	185	Bob McKelvey	FB-LB	Northwestern	
8	186	Sam Harris	TE	Colorado	
8	211	Barry Siler	LB	Albion College	
9	212	Tim Lavens	TE	Idaho	
9	237	Eugene Ross	DB	Oklahoma	
10	238	Charlie Brown	FL-SE	Missouri	
10	263	Roosevelt Robertson	FL	North Carolina College	
11	264	Jim Benson	G	Florida State	
11	288	Bernard Corbin	S	Alabama A&M	
12	289	Ronnie Pack	G	Texas Tech	
12	315	John Robinson	FL	Tennessee A&I	
13	316	Bill Stetz	LB	Boston College	
13	341	Gary Grossnickle	S	Missouri	
14	342	Jim Hester	TE	North Dakota	
14	367	George Stetter	DB	Virginia	
15	368	John Snow	OT	Wake Forest	
15	393	Darrell Johnson	RB	Lamar Tech	
16	394	Marcus Rhoden	FL-SE	Mississippi State	
16	419	Bruce Cortez	DB	Parsons College	
17	420	Danny Abramowicz	SE	Xavier (Ohio)	
17	438	Billy Bob Stewart	FB-LB	Southern Methodist	Selection acquired from Baltimore Colts
17	445	Jimmy Walker	DB-FL	Providence	
Made roster * Made at least one Pro Bowl during career

=== Undrafted free agents ===
1967 undrafted free agents of note
Player	Position	College
Larry Metevia	Center	Grambling State

== Personnel ==
=== Staff ===
1967 New Orleans Saints staff
Front office: President – John Mecom Jr.; Executive Vice-President / general manager – Bert Rose; Director of Player Personnel – Vic Schwenk; Director of Player Relations – George Owen; Director of Promotions and Special Events – Bill Smythe; Director of Public Relations – Donald Smith; Public Relations Assistant – Patricia Cross; Public Relations Consultant – Jim Hall; Business Manager – Carroll Martin; College Scouting –; North Central Area Scout – Dave Smith; Northeastern Area Scout – Ray Masters; South Central Area Scout – Al Tabor; Southeastern Area Scout – Henry Lee Parker; Western Area Scout – Ray Newman; Comptroller – Cyril Nelson; Entertainment Director – Tommy Walker; Ticket Manager – Henry Simoneaux; Head coaches: Head coach – Tom Fears; Offensive coaches: Chief offensive coach – George Dickson; Offensive line coach – Walt Yowarsky; Receiver coach – Bob Shaw	Defensive coaches: Chief defensive coach – Jack Faulkner; Defensive line coach – Ed Khayat; Linebacker coach – J. D. Roberts; Strength and conditioning: Trainer – Fred Peterson; Assistant trainer – Bill Cuthbertson; Equipment manager – Charlie Shepherd; Assistant Equipment Manager – Wallace Brown

=== Roster ===
1967 New Orleans Saints roster
Quarterbacks (QB): 15 Gary Cuozzo; 17 Billy Kilmer; 19 Gary Wood; Running backs (RB): 32 Tom Barrington; 22 Charlie Brown; 36 Don McCall; 33 Randy Schultz; 31 Jim Taylor; 39 Ernie Wheelwright; Wide receivers (WR): 46 Danny Abramowicz; 42 John Gilliam; 86 Tom Hall; 85 Ray Poage; 27 Walter Roberts; Tight ends (TE): 89 Kent Kramer	Offensive linemen (OL): 71 Dick Anderson T; 78 Jerry Jones T; 63 Roy Schmidt G; 58 Eli Strand G; 73 Jerry Sturm T; 54 Joe Wendryhoski C; 61 Del Williams G; Defensive linemen (DL): 81 Doug Atkins DE; 79 Lou Cordileone DT; 72 Earl Leggett DT; 76 Dave Rowe DT; 60 Brian Schweda DE; 74 Mike Tilleman DT	Linebackers (LB): 55 Jackie Burkett OLB; 66 Bill Cody MLB; 35 Ted Davis OLB; 30 Leslie Kelley OLB; 59 Fred Whittingham MLB; Defensive backs (DB): 16 Bo Burris FS; 21 John Douglas CB; 26 Jimmy Heidel SS; 0 Obert Logan FS; 44 George Rose CB; 23 Dave Whitsell CB; 20 George Youngblood SS; Special teams (ST): 10 Charlie Durkee K; 12 Tom McNeill P	Practice squad: -- Tom Carr DE; -- John Erisman WR; 67 George Harvey T; 84 Jim Hester TE; -- Ted Holman CB; -- Doug McFalls S; 45 Jimmy Jordan RB; -- Eugene Ross S; 38 Phil Vandersea LB; Reserve: 83 Vern Burke TE (IR); 47 Bruce Cortez CB (IR); 80 Jim Garcia DE (IR); -- Riley Mattson T (DNR); 71 Dave McCormick T (IR); 24 Elijah Nevett WR (Military); 77 Ray Rissmiller T (IR); -- Bob Scholtz C (DNR); 53 Dave Simmons LB (IR); 37 Steve Stonebreaker LB (IR); Rookies in italics

== Pre-season ==
The Saints played six pre-season games, finishing with a record of 5–1.

Week	Date	Opponent	Result	Record	Venue	Attendance
1	August 2	at Los Angeles Rams	L 7–16	0–1	Anaheim Stadium	26,364
2	August 12	St. Louis Cardinals	W 23–14	1–1	State Fair Stadium	25,500
3	August 19	Pittsburgh Steelers	W 20–17	2–1	Tiger Stadium	35,000
4	August 26	vs. San Francisco 49ers	W 24–10	3–1	Civic Stadium	23,348
5	September 2	vs. Miami Dolphins	W 20–17	4–1	Johnson Hagood Stadium	11,214
6	September 9	Atlanta Falcons	W 27–14	5–1	Tulane Stadium	67,486

== Regular season ==
Things couldn't have looked better for the Saints and their inaugural season. A 5–1 preseason record was followed by a 94-yard kickoff return for a touchdown by rookie John Gilliam to begin the 1967 season against the Los Angeles Rams. (There is a rumor in the annals of New Orleans Saints legends that following this play many fans allegedly heard another fan in Tulane Stadium shout out aloud "This is going to be the greatest football team in history!" – thus jinxing the Saints for their first 20 years of existence). Apparently the Rams were not informed of this declaration as they quickly recovered from the opening blow to win 27–13. The first-ever win for the Saints came in week 8 when wide receiver Flea Roberts scored 3 touchdowns in a 31–24 victory over the Philadelphia Eagles. With additional triumphs over Atlanta and Washington the 3 wins for the year matched the most for an expansion team. Former Green Bay great Jim Taylor led the team with 390 yards rushing and 17th round pick rookie Danny Abramowicz from Xavier College led in receiving with 50 grabs for 721 yards and 6 touchdowns. Defensive back Dave Whitshell led the team as well as the NFL in interceptions with 10 steals—still a New Orleans Saint season record.

=== Schedule ===
Week	Date	Opponent	Result	Record	Venue	Attendance
1	September 17	Los Angeles Rams	**L** 13–27	0–1	Tulane Stadium	80,879
2	September 24	**Washington Redskins**	**L** 10–30	0–2	Tulane Stadium	74,937
3	October 1	Cleveland Browns	**L** 7–42	0–3	Tulane Stadium	77,045
4	October 8	at New York Giants	**L** 21–27	0–4	Yankee Stadium	62,670
5	October 15	at **Dallas Cowboys**	**L** 10–14	0–5	Cotton Bowl	64,128
6	October 22	at San Francisco 49ers	**L** 13–27	0–6	Kezar Stadium	34,285
7	October 29	Pittsburgh Steelers	**L** 10–14	0–7	Tulane Stadium	68,911
8	November 5	**Philadelphia Eagles**	**W** 31–24	1–7	Tulane Stadium	59,596
9	November 12	**Dallas Cowboys**	**L** 10–27	1–8	Tulane Stadium	83,437
10	November 19	at **Philadelphia Eagles**	**L** 21–48	1–9	Franklin Field	60,751
11	November 26	Atlanta Falcons	**W** 27–24	2–9	Tulane Stadium	83,437
12	December 3	at St. Louis Cardinals	**L** 20–31	2–10	Busch Memorial Stadium	41,171
13	December 10	at Baltimore Colts	**L** 10–30	2–11	Memorial Stadium	60,238
14	December 17	at **Washington Redskins**	**W** 30–14	3–11	District of Columbia Stadium	50,486
Note: Intra-division opponents are in **bold** text.

=== Game summaries ===
==== Week 1: vs. Los Angeles Rams ====
Team	1	2	3	4	Total
• Rams	3	10	7	7	27
**Saints**	7	3	3	0	13

- Date: Sunday, September 17
- Location: Tulane Stadium, New Orleans, Louisiana
- Game start: 1:30 p.m. CT
- Game attendance: 80,879
- Game weather: 75 °F (24 °C), relative humidity 66%, wind 7 mph (11 km/h)

Scoring summary
1	NO	John Gilliam 94-yard kickoff return (Charlie Durkee kick)	NO 7–0
1	LA	Bruce Gossett 10-yard field goal	NO 7–3
2	LA	Bruce Gossett 21-yard field goal	NO 7–6
2	NO	Charlie Durkee 44-yard field goal	NO 10–6
2	LA	Roman Gabriel 2-yard rush (Bruce Gossett kick)	LA 13–10
3	NO	Charlie Durkee 25-yard field goal	Tied 13–13
3	LA	Dick Bass 13-yard rush (Bruce Gossett kick)	LA 20–13
4	LA	Les Josephson 15-yard pass from Roman Gabriel (Bruce Gossett kick)	LA 27–13

==== Week 2: vs. Washington Redskins ====
Team	1	2	3	4	Total
• Redskins	6	14	0	10	30
**Saints**	3	7	0	0	10

- Date: Sunday, September 24
- Location: Tulane Stadium, New Orleans, Louisiana
- Game start: 1:30 p.m. CT
- Game attendance: 74,937
- Game weather: 72 °F (22 °C), relative humidity 63%, wind 6 mph (9.7 km/h)

Scoring summary
1	WAS	Ray McDonald 1-yard rush	WAS 6–0
1	NO	Charlie Durkee 27-yard field goal	WAS 6–3
2	NO	Walter Roberts 36-yard pass from Billy Kilmer (Charlie Durkee kick)	NO 10–6
2	WAS	Ray McDonald 36-yard rush (John Love kick)	WAS 13–10
2	WAS	Charley Taylor 40-yard pass from Sonny Jurgensen (John Love kick)	WAS 20–10
4	WAS	Ray McDonald 15-yard rush (John Love kick)	WAS 27–10
4	WAS	John Love 37-yard field goal	WAS 30–10

==== Week 3: vs. Cleveland Browns ====
Team	1	2	3	4	Total
• Browns	7	7	14	14	42
**Saints**	0	7	0	0	7

- Date: Sunday, October 1
- Location: Tulane Stadium, New Orleans, Louisiana
- Game start: 1:30 p.m. CT
- Game attendance: 77,045
- Game weather: 61 °F (16 °C), relative humidity 68%, wind 8 mph (13 km/h)

Scoring summary
1	CLE	Paul Warfield 18-yard pass from Frank Ryan (Lou Groza kick)	CLE 7–0
2	NO	Jim Taylor 2-yard rush (Charlie Durkee kick)	Tied 7–7
2	CLE	Ernie Green 41-yard pass from Frank Ryan (Lou Groza kick)	CLE 14–7
3	CLE	Leroy Kelly 1-yard rush (Lou Groza kick)	CLE 21–7
3	CLE	Ernie Green 2-yard rush (Lou Groza kick)	CLE 28–0
4	CLE	Paul Warfield 49-yard pass from Frank Ryan (Lou Groza kick)	CLE 35–7
4	CLE	Ralph Smith offensive fumble recovery in end zone (Lou Groza kick)	CLE 42–7

==== Week 4: at New York Giants ====
Team	1	2	3	4	Total
Saints	7	7	7	0	21
• **Giants**	7	7	6	7	27

- Date: Sunday, October 8
- Location: Yankee Stadium, New York City, New York
- Game start: 1:30 p.m. ET
- Game attendance: 62,670
- Game weather: 55 °F (13 °C), relative humidity 60%, wind 10 mph (16 km/h)

Scoring summary
1	NY	Ernie Koy 1-yard rush (Les Murdock kick)	NY 7–0
1	NO	Danny Abramowicz 13-yard pass from Gary Cuozzo (Charlie Durkee kick)	Tied 7–7
2	NO	Gary Cuozzo 1-yard rush (Charlie Durkee kick)	NO 14–7
2	NY	Tucker Frederickson 2-yard rush (Les Murdock kick)	Tied 14–14
3	NY	Homer Jones 34-yard pass from Fran Tarkenton	NY 20–14
3	NO	John Gilliam 19-yard pass from Gary Cuozzo (Charlie Durkee kick)	NO 21–20
4	NY	Bobby Crespino 11-yard pass from Fran Tarkenton (Wendell Harris kick)	NY 27–21

==== Week 5: at Dallas Cowboys ====
Team	1	2	3	4	Total
Saints	0	7	3	0	10
• **Cowboys**	7	7	0	0	14

- Date: Sunday, October 15
- Location: Cotton Bowl, Dallas, Texas
- Game start: 1:35 p.m. CT
- Game attendance: 64,128
- Game weather: 72 °F (22 °C), relative humidity 83%, wind 13 mph (21 km/h)

Scoring summary
1	DAL	Don Perkins 2-yard rush (Danny Villanueva kick)	DAL 7–0
2	NO	Dave Whitsell 26-yard interception return (Charlie Durkee kick)	Tied 7–7
2	DAL	Lance Rentzel 20-yard pass from Craig Morton (Danny Villanueva kick)	DAL 14–7
3	NO	Charlie Durkee 47-yard field goal	DAL 14–10

==== Week 6: at San Francisco 49ers ====
Team	1	2	3	4	Total
Saints	0	6	7	0	13
• **49ers**	3	7	7	10	27

- Date: Sunday, October 22
- Location: Kezar Stadium, San Francisco, California
- Game start: 1:00 p.m. PT
- Game attendance: 34,285
- Game weather: 61 °F (16 °C), relative humidity 87%, wind 11 mph (18 km/h)

Scoring summary
1	SF	Tommy Davis 50-yard field goal	SF 3–0
2	NO	Charlie Durkee 39-yard field goal	Tied 3–3
2	NO	Charlie Durkee 34-yard field goal	NO 6–3
2	SF	Bob Windsor 2-yard pass from John Brodie (Tommy Davis kick)	SF 10–6
3	NO	Walter Roberts 47-yard pass from Gary Cuozzo (Charlie Durkee kick)	NO 13–10
3	SF	Dick Witcher 15-yard pass from John Brodie (Tommy Davis kick)	SF 17–13
4	SF	Tommy Davis 39-yard field goal	SF 20–13
4	SF	Ken Willard 2-yard rush (Tommy Davis kick)	SF 27–13

==== Week 7: vs. Pittsburgh Steelers ====
Team	1	2	3	4	Total
• Steelers	0	0	0	14	14
**Saints**	3	7	0	0	10

- Date: Sunday, October 29
- Location: Tulane Stadium, New Orleans, Louisiana
- Game start: 1:30 p.m. CT
- Game attendance: 68,911
- Game weather: 67 °F (19 °C), relative humidity 75%, wind 12 mph (19 km/h)

Scoring summary
1	NO	Charlie Durkee 37-yard field goal	NO 3–0
2	NO	Jim Taylor 2-yard rush (Charlie Durkee kick)	NO 10–0
4	PIT	J.R. Wilburn 5-yard pass from Bill Nelsen (Mike Clark kick)	NO 10–7
4	PIT	Don Shy 33-yard rush (Mike Clark kick)	PIT 14–10

==== Week 8: vs. Philadelphia Eagles ====
Team	1	2	3	4	Total
Eagles	0	10	0	14	24
• **Saints**	7	7	10	7	31

- Date: Sunday, November 5
- Location: Tulane Stadium, New Orleans, Louisiana
- Game start: 1:30 p.m. CT
- Game attendance: 59,596
- Game weather: 50 °F (10 °C), relative humidity 61%, wind 12 mph (19 km/h)

Scoring summary
1	NO	Walter Roberts 91-yard kickoff return (Charlie Durkee kick)	NO 7–0
2	NO	Walter Roberts 27-yard offensive fumble return (Charlie Durkee kick)	NO 14–0
2	PHI	Sam Baker 41-yard field goal	NO 14–3
2	PHI	Jim Kelly 22-yard pass from Norm Snead (Sam Baker kick)	NO 14–10
3	NO	Charlie Durkee 12-yard field goal	NO 17–10
3	NO	Dave Whitsell 41-yard interception return (Charlie Durkee kick)	NO 24–10
4	PHI	Gary Ballman 14-yard pass from Norm Snead (Sam Baker kick)	NO 24–17
4	NO	Walter Roberts 49-yard pass from Gary Cuozzo (Charlie Durkee kick)	NO 31–17
4	PHI	Timmy Brown 33-yard pass from Norm Snead (Sam Baker kick)	NO 31–24

==== Week 9: vs. Dallas Cowboys ====
Team	1	2	3	4	Total
• Cowboys	7	7	10	3	27
**Saints**	7	0	3	0	10

- Date: Sunday, November 12
- Location: Tulane Stadium, New Orleans, Louisiana
- Game start: 1:00 p.m. CT
- Game attendance: 83,437
- Game weather: 65 °F (18 °C), relative humidity 88%, wind 6 mph (9.7 km/h)

Scoring summary
1	NO	Danny Abramowicz 9-yard pass from Gary Cuozzo (Charlie Durkee kick)	NO 7–0
1	DAL	Don Perkins 14-yard rush (Danny Villanueva kick)	Tied 7–7
2	DAL	Dan Reeves 5-yard rush (Danny Villanueva kick)	DAL 14–7
3	NO	Charlie Durkee 11-yard field goal	DAL 14–10
3	DAL	Danny Villanueva 21-yard field goal	DAL 17–10
3	DAL	Frank Clarke 56-yard rush (Danny Villanueva kick)	DAL 24–10
4	DAL	Danny Villanueva 12-yard field goal	DAL 27–10

==== Week 10: at Philadelphia Eagles ====
Team	1	2	3	4	Total
Saints	0	7	0	14	21
• **Eagles**	3	28	10	7	48

- Date: Sunday, November 19
- Location: Franklin Field, Philadelphia, Pennsylvania
- Game start: 1:15 p.m. ET
- Game attendance: 60,751
- Game weather: 44 °F (7 °C), relative humidity 53%, wind 19 mph (31 km/h)

Scoring summary
1	PHI	Sam Baker 21-yard field goal	PHI 3–0
2	PHI	Ben Hawkins 10-yard pass from Norm Snead (Sam Baker kick)	PHI 10–0
2	NO	Danny Abramowicz 22-yard pass from Gary Cuozzo (Charlie Durkee kick)	PHI 10–7
2	PHI	Tom Woodeshick 5-yard rush (Sam Baker kick)	PHI 17–7
2	PHI	Jim Kelly 35-yard pass from Norm Snead (Sam Baker kick)	PHI 24–7
2	PHI	Tom Woodeshick 13-yard pass from Norm Snead (Sam Baker kick)	PHI 31–7
3	PHI	Ben Hawkins 19-yard pass from Norm Snead (Sam Baker kick)	PHI 38–7
3	PHI	Sam Baker 37-yard field goal	PHI 41–7
4	PHI	Izzy Lang 15-yard pass from King Hill (Sam Baker kick)	PHI 48–7
4	NO	Don McCall 11-yard pass from Billy Kilmer (Charlie Durkee kick)	PHI 48–14
4	NO	Danny Abramowicz 1-yard pass from Billy Kilmer (Ted Davis kick)	PHI 48–21

==== Week 11: vs. Atlanta Falcons ====
Team	1	2	3	4	Total
Falcons	0	21	0	3	24
• **Saints**	3	7	7	10	27

- Date: Sunday, November 26
- Location: Tulane Stadium, New Orleans, Louisiana
- Game start: 1:00 p.m. CT
- Game attendance: 83,437
- Game weather: 72 °F (22 °C), relative humidity 84%, wind 10 mph (16 km/h)

Scoring summary
1	NO	Charlie Durkee 34-yard field goal	NO 3–0
2	ATL	Junior Coffey 1-yard rush (Wade Traynham kick)	ATL 7–3
2	ATL	Tommy McDonald 32-yard pass from Perry Lee Dunn (Wade Traynham kick)	ATL 14–3
2	ATL	Billy Martin 5-yard pass from Randy Johnson (Wade Traynham kick)	ATL 21–3
2	NO	Kent Kramer 7-yard pass from Gary Cuozzo (Charlie Durkee kick)	ATL 21–10
3	NO	Randy Schultz 22-yard rush (Charlie Durkee kick)	ATL 21–17
4	NO	Charlie Durkee 32-yard field goal	ATL 21–20
4	ATL	Wade Traynham 26-yard field goal	ATL 24–20
4	NO	Kent Kramer 7-yard pass from Billy Kilmer (Charlie Durkee kick)	NO 27–24

==== Week 12: at St. Louis Cardinals ====
Team	1	2	3	4	Total
Saints	3	3	7	7	20
• **Cardinals**	7	0	10	14	31

- Date: Sunday, December 3
- Location: Busch Memorial Stadium, St. Louis, Missouri
- Game start: 1:00 p.m. CT
- Game attendance: 41,171
- Game weather: 34 °F (1 °C), relative humidity 87%, wind 16 mph (26 km/h), wind chill 24

Scoring summary
1	NO	Charlie Durkee 41-yard field goal	NO 3–0
1	STL	Johnny Roland 54-yard rush (Jim Bakken kick)	STL 7–3
2	NO	Charlie Durkee 16-yard field goal	STL 7–6
3	STL	Jackie Smith 20-yard pass from Jim Hart (Jim Bakken kick)	STL 14–6
3	NO	Billy Kilmer 1-yard rush (Charlie Durkee kick)	STL 14–13
3	STL	Jim Bakken 27-yard field goal	STL 17–13
4	STL	Prentice Gautt 19-yard rush (Jim Bakken kick)	STL 24–13
4	STL	Jackie Smith 76-yard pass from Jim Hart (Jim Bakken)	STL 31–13
4	NO	Charlie Brown 4-yard rush (Charlie Durkee kick)	STL 31–20

==== Week 13: at Baltimore Colts ====
Team	1	2	3	4	Total
Saints	0	0	10	0	10
• **Colts**	7	10	3	10	30

- Date: Sunday, December 10
- Location: Memorial Stadium, Baltimore, Maryland
- Game start: 2:05 p.m. ET
- Game attendance: 60,238
- Game weather: 40 °F (4 °C), relative humidity 78%, wind 14 mph (23 km/h)

Scoring summary
1	BAL	Tony Lorick 1-yard rush (Lou Michaels kick)	BAL 7–0
2	BAL	Lou Michaels 35-yard field goal	BAL 10–0
2	BAL	Tom Matte 2-yard rush (Lou Michaels kick)	BAL 17–0
3	NO	Charlie Durkee 35-yard field goal	BAL 17–3
3	BAL	Lou Michaels 21-yard field goal	BAL 20–3
3	NO	Charlie Brown 5-yard rush (Charlie Durkee kick)	BAL 20–10
4	BAL	Lou Michaels 17-yard field goal	BAL 23–10
4	BAL	Jerry Hill 1-yard rush (Lou Michaels kick)	BAL 30–10

==== Week 14: at Washington Redskins ====
Team	1	2	3	4	Total
• Saints	0	7	9	14	30
**Redskins**	0	0	7	7	14

- Date: Sunday, December 17
- Location: District of Columbia Stadium, Washington, D.C.
- Game start: 1:15 p.m. ET
- Game attendance: 50,486
- Game weather: 36 °F (2 °C), relative humidity 50%, wind 6 mph (9.7 km/h), wind chill 30

Scoring summary
2	NO	Danny Abramowicz 80-yard pass from Billy Kilmer (Charlie Durkee kick)	NO 7–0
3	WAS	Charley Taylor 6-yard pass from Sonny Jurgensen (Bruce Alford kick)	Tied 7–7
3	NO	Safety; John Love tackled in end zone by Dick Anderson	NO 9–7
3	NO	Randy Schultz 1-yard rush (Charlie Durkee kick)	NO 16–7
4	NO	Danny Abramowicz 13-yard pass from Billy Kilmer (Charlie Durkee kick)	NO 23–7
4	WAS	A. D. Whitfield 23-yard pass from Sonny Jurgensen (Bruce Alford kick)	NO 23–14
4	NO	Don McCall 49-yard rush (Charlie Durkee kick)	NO 30–14

=== Standings ===
NFL Capitol
	W	L	T	PCT	DIV	CONF	PF	PA	STK
Dallas Cowboys	9	5	0	.643	4–2	8–2	342	268	L1
Philadelphia Eagles	6	7	1	.462	3–2–1	5–4–1	351	409	W1
Washington Redskins	5	6	3	.455	2–3–1	4–5–1	347	353	L1
New Orleans Saints	3	11	0	.214	2–4	2–8	233	379	W1

Note: Tie games were not officially counted in the standings until 1972.
