= 1968 New Orleans Saints season =

NFL team season

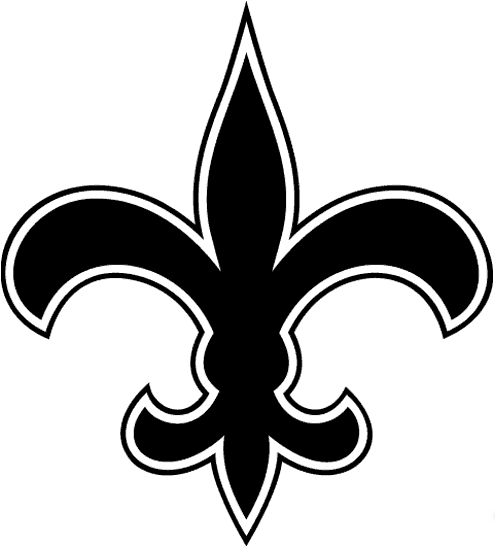
- Owner: John W. Mecom Jr.
- General manager: Vic Schwenk
- Head coach: Tom Fears
- Home stadium: Tulane Stadium

Results
- Record: 4–9–1
- Division place: 3rd Century
- Playoffs: Did not qualify
- Pro Bowlers: None

The 1968 New Orleans Saints season was the team's second as a member of the National Football League (NFL). They improved on their previous season's output of 3–11, winning four games. The team failed to qualify for the playoffs for the second consecutive season, and finished third in the Century Division of the NFL Eastern Conference.

== Offseason ==
=== NFL draft ===
1968 New Orleans Saints draft
Round	Pick	Player	Position	College	Notes
1	7	Kevin Hardy	Defensive tackle	Notre Dame	
3	59	Dave Szymakowski	Wide receiver	West Texas State	
4	85	Willie Crittendon	Defensive tackle	Tulsa	
4	103	Dan Sartin	Defensive tackle	Ole Miss	
5	115	Ronnie Lee South	Quarterback	Arkansas	
7	169	Ray Phillips	Guard	Michigan	
7	175	Gene Howard	Defensive back	Langston	
8	195	Dick Swatland	Guard	Notre Dame	
9	223	Joe Blake	Tackle	Tulsa	
10	254	Doug Robinson	Defensive back	Iowa State	
11	276	Bennie Blocker	Running back	South Carolina State	
12	303	John Beck	Defensive back	San Diego State	
13	331	K.O. Trepanier	Defensive end	Montana State	
14	359	Herb Covington	Running back	Memphis State	
15	384	Wilmer Cooks	Running back	Colorado	
16	411	Elie Ghattas	Guard	Ball State	
17	439	James Ferguson	Center	USC	
Made roster

=== Undrafted free agents ===
1968 undrafted free agents of note
Player	Position	College
Tim Montgomery	Defensive back	Penn State

== Personnel ==
=== Staff ===
1968 New Orleans Saints staff
Front office: President – John W. Mecom, Jr.; General Manager – Vic Schwenk; Head coaches: Head Coach – Tom Fears; Offensive coaches: Chief Offensive – George Dickson; Receivers – Bob Shaw; Offensive Line – Brad Ecklund; Offensive Line – Walt Yowarsky	Defensive coaches: Chief Defensive – Jack Faulkner; Defensive Line – Ed Khayat; Linebackers – J. D. Roberts

=== Roster ===
1968 New Orleans Saints roster
Quarterbacks (QB): 17 Billy Kilmer; 14 Karl Sweetan; 11 Ronnie Lee South P; Running backs (RB): 38 Tony Baker; 32 Tom Barrington; 22 Charlie Brown; 34 Tony Lorick; 36 Don McCall; 33 Randy Schultz; 39 Ernie Wheelwright; Wide receivers (WR): 46 Danny Abramowicz; 42 John Gilliam; 83 Dave Parks; 85 Ray Poage; 88 Dave Szymakowski; Tight ends (TE): 84 Jim Hester; 85 Monty Stickles	Offensive linemen (OL): 77 Jim Boeke T; 56 Jim Ferguson C; 62 Ross Gwinn G; 78 Jerry Jones T; 50 Jake Kupp G; 63 Roy Schmidt G; 73 Jerry Sturm T; 54 Joe Wendryhoski C; 61 Del Williams G; Defensive linemen (DL): 81 Doug Atkins DE; 65 Tom Carr DE; 79 Lou Cordileone DT; 72 Earl Leggett DT; 76 Dave Rowe DT; 60 Brian Schweda DE; 74 Mike Tilleman DT/DE	Linebackers (LB): 82 Johnny Brewer OLB; 66 Bill Cody MLB; 35 Ted Davis OLB; 30 Leslie Kelley OLB; 37 Steve Stonebreaker OLB; 59 Fred Whittingham MLB; Defensive backs (DB): 16 Bo Burris SS; 21 John Douglas CB; 28 Ross Fichtner FS; 29 Gene Howard CB; 45 Elbert Kimbrough SS; 24 Elijah Nevett CB; 23 Dave Whitsell CB; 20 George Youngblood SS; Special teams (ST): 10 Charlie Durkee K; 12 Tom McNeill P	Practice squad: 25 Al Dodd CB; -- Bob McKelvey LB; Reserve: 86 Dan Colchico DE (IR); Rookies in italics

== Schedule ==
Week	Date	Opponent	Result	Record	Venue	Attendance
1	September 15	**Cleveland Browns**	**L** 10–24	0–1	Tulane Stadium	74,215
2	September 22	Washington Redskins	**W** 37–17	1–1	Tulane Stadium	65,941
3	September 29	**St. Louis Cardinals**	**L** 20–21	1–2	Tulane Stadium	79,021
4	October 6	at New York Giants	**L** 21–38	1–3	Yankee Stadium	60,967
5	October 13	Minnesota Vikings	**W** 20–17	2–3	Tulane Stadium	71,105
6	October 20	at **Pittsburgh Steelers**	**W** 16–12	3–3	Pitt Stadium	32,303
7	October 27	at **St. Louis Cardinals**	**L** 17–31	3–4	Busch Memorial Stadium	45,476
8	November 3	Dallas Cowboys	**L** 3–17	3–5	Tulane Stadium	84,728
9	November 10	at **Cleveland Browns**	**L** 17–35	3–6	Cleveland Municipal Stadium	71,025
10	November 17	at Green Bay Packers	**L** 7–29	3–7	Milwaukee County Stadium	49,644
11	November 24	at Detroit Lions	**T** 20–20	3–7–1	Tiger Stadium	46,152
12	December 1	Chicago Bears	**L** 17–23	3–8–1	Tulane Stadium	78,285
13	December 8	at Philadelphia Eagles	**L** 17–29	3–9–1	Franklin Field	57,128
14	December 15	**Pittsburgh Steelers**	**W** 24–14	4–9–1	Tulane Stadium	66,131
Note: Intra-division opponents are in **bold** text.

== Standings ==
NFL Century
	W	L	T	PCT	DIV	CONF	PF	PA	STK
Cleveland Browns	10	4	0	.714	4–2	7–3	394	273	L1
St. Louis Cardinals	9	4	1	.692	5–0–1	8–1–1	325	289	W4
New Orleans Saints	4	9	1	.308	2–4	3–7	246	327	W1
Pittsburgh Steelers	2	11	1	.154	0–5–1	1–8–1	244	397	L5

Note: Tie games were not officially counted in the standings until 1972.
