= 1967 NFL expansion draft =

Selection of players by the New Orleans Saints

General information
- Sport: American football
- Date: February 9, 1967

Overview
- League: NFL
- Expansion teams: New Orleans Saints
- Expansion season: 1967

The 1967 National Football League expansion draft was a National Football League (NFL) draft held on February 9, 1967 in which a new expansion team named the New Orleans Saints selected its first players. On November 1, 1966 (All Saints Day), NFL owners awarded its 16th team franchise to the city of New Orleans, Louisiana. The Saints selected 42 players in total from every team roster except for the Atlanta Falcons, who had begun play in the 1966 season. The expansion draft included future Hall of Famer running back Paul Hornung, who set an NFL record by scoring 176 points in only 12 games in 1960 for the Green Bay Packers, but did not play in Super Bowl I. Hornung never played a down for the Saints and retired in the preseason due to a neck injury.

Following the expansion draft, the Saints signed Hornung's backfield mate with the Packers, Jim Taylor to a 10-year, $400,000 contract. Taylor played just one season in his home state (Taylor was a native of Baton Rouge and was an All-American at LSU) and retired in September 1968.

== Player selections ==
1967 NFL expansion draft — New Orleans Saints
From	Player	Position	Experience		College	Notes
From	Player	Position	G	S	College	Notes
Baltimore Colts	Jackie Burkett	LB	79	6	Auburn	
Baltimore Colts	Ted Davis	LB	38	3	Georgia Tech	
Baltimore Colts	Steve Stonebreaker	LB	60	5	Detroit	
Chicago Bears	Riley Mattson	OT	68	5	Oregon	Did not report.
Chicago Bears	Brian Schweda	DE	14	1	Kansas	
Chicago Bears	Dave Whitsell *	CB	119	9	Indiana	
Cleveland Browns	Jim Battle	DE	6	1	Southern	
Cleveland Browns	John Morrow *	C	125	10	Michigan	
Cleveland Browns	Walter Roberts	FL	42	3	San Jose State	
Dallas Cowboys	Obert Logan	S	28	2	Trinity	
Dallas Cowboys	Bill Sandeman	OT	8	1	Pacific	
Dallas Cowboys	Larry Stephens	DT	94	7	Texas	
Detroit Lions	Bill Cody	LB	1	1	Auburn	Injured reserve.
Detroit Lions	Bobby Smith	CB	69	6	UCLA	Also known as Bobby Lee Smith
Detroit Lions	Willie Walker	FL-SE	9	1	Tennessee State	
Green Bay Packers	Bill Curry *	C-LB	28	2	Georgia Tech	Traded along with three draft selections (one of which was Bubba Smith) to Baltimore Colts for Gary Cuozzo, Butch Allison and a 1967 17th-round pick on March 6, 1967.
Green Bay Packers	Paul Hornung * ^{†}	HB	104	9	Notre Dame	
Green Bay Packers	Phil Vandersea	FB-LB	14	1	Massachusetts	
Los Angeles Rams	Steve Heckard	FL-SE	25	2	Davidson; USC	
Los Angeles Rams	Earl Leggett	DT	112	9	Louisiana State	
Los Angeles Rams	Joe Wendryhoski	C-E	31	3	Illinois	
Minnesota Vikings	Tom Hall	FL-SE	69	5	Minnesota	
Minnesota Vikings	George Rose	CB	34	3	Auburn	
Minnesota Vikings	Mike Tilleman	DT	12	1	Montana	
New York Giants	Jim Garcia	DE	22	2	Purdue	
New York Giants	Bob Scholtz	OT	81	7	Notre Dame	Did not report.
New York Giants	Gary Wood	QB	35	3	Cornell	
Philadelphia Eagles	Dave Cahill	DE	14	1	Northern Arizona	Traded to Los Angeles Rams for Mike Capshaw and an undisclosed draft choice on July 1, 1967.
Philadelphia Eagles	Ray Rissmiller	OT	1	1	Georgia	
Philadelphia Eagles	Fred Whittingham	LB	19	2	Cal Poly	
Pittsburgh Steelers	Charlie Bradshaw *	OT	118	9	Baylor	Traded to Detroit Lions for Bruce McLenna on March 9, 1967.
Pittsburgh Steelers	Jerry Simmons	SE	17	2	Bethune-Cookman	
Pittsburgh Steelers	Bobby Smith *	HB	36	3	North Texas State	Also known as Bob Smith
St. Louis Cardinals	Jimmy Heidel	S	14	1	Mississippi	
St. Louis Cardinals	Ray Ogden	TE	17	2	Alabama	
St. Louis Cardinals	Dave Simmons	LB	20	2	Georgia Tech	
San Francisco 49ers	Billy Kilmer *	QB	39	4	UCLA	
San Francisco 49ers	Elbert Kimbrough	S	75	6	Northwestern	
San Francisco 49ers	Kent Kramer	TE	14	1	Minnesota	
Washington Redskins	Tom Barrington	FB	6	1	Ohio State	
Washington Redskins	Don Croftcheck	G	26	2	Indiana	Traded to Chicago Bears for Doug Atkins and Herman Lee on July 16, 1967.
Washington Redskins	Jake Kupp *	G	42	3	Washington	
Made roster * Made Pro Bowl during career † Pro Football Hall of Fame
