= Dave Cahill =

American football player (1941–2012)

No. 58, 70, 73
- Position: Defensive tackle

Personal information
- Born: July 26, 1941; Stanley, Wisconsin
- Died: November 12, 2012 (aged 71); Irvine, California
- Listed height: 6 ft 3 in (1.91 m)
- Listed weight: 245 lb (111 kg)

Career information
- High school: Tempe
- College: Northern Arizona
- NFL draft: 1965: undrafted

Career history
- Philadelphia Eagles (1965–1966); Los Angeles Rams (1967–1968); Atlanta Falcons (1969)

Career NFL statistics
- Games played: 39
- Stats at Pro Football Reference

David Allen Cahill (July 26, 1941 - November 12, 2012) was an American football defensive tackle who played professionally in the National Football League (NFL). Cahill first played with the Philadelphia Eagles during the 1966 NFL season. He was selected by the New Orleans Saints in the 1967 NFL expansion draft, but played that season with the Los Angeles Rams. After a year away from the NFL, he played with the Atlanta Falcons during the 1969 NFL season.
