= Ronnie Lee South =

American football player (born 1945)

No. 11, 12
- Positions: Quarterback, Punter

Personal information
- Born: May 8, 1945 (age 81); Wynne, Arkansas, U.S.
- Listed height: 6 ft 1 in (1.85 m)
- Listed weight: 195 lb (88 kg)

Career information
- High school: Russellville (Russellville, Arkansas)
- College: Arkansas (1963-1967)
- NFL draft: 1968: 5th round, 115th overall pick

Career history
- New Orleans Saints (1968); Richmond Roadrunners (1969)

Career NFL statistics
- Passing yards: 129
- TD-INT: 1-3
- Passer rating: 22.8
- Punts: 14
- Punt yards: 387
- Stats at Pro Football Reference

Ronnie Lee South (born May 8, 1945) is an American former professional football player who was a quarterback for the New Orleans Saints of the National Football League (NFL). South played college football for the Arkansas Razorbacks where he was a member of their 1965, 1966 and 1967 teams.

South was taken 115th overall in the fifth round of the 1968 NFL/AFL draft by the New Orleans Saints. On April 16, 1968, he signed his initial contract with the Saints to play as part of their 1968 season. South played with the team through their summer training camp, but was later released in August as part of the teams' final roster cuts. After the final cuts, South was signed to the Saints' practice squad.

During their November 3 game against Dallas, Saints starting quarterback Billy Kilmer injured his ankle. As such, South was elevated to the active roster to serve as backup to Karl Sweetan. As South was also a punter, then punter Tom McNeill was released from the team to make room for South on the active roster. In their game against Cleveland, Sweetan injured his ankle and South entered the game in the first quarter for his first series before Sweetan returned later. Sweetan was unable to complete the game, and in the fourth quarter South threw what was his only NFL touchdown pass to Jim Hester from seven-yards out in the fourth quarter.

With both Kilmer and Sweetan injured, it was speculated South would start for the Saints in their game against the Packers at Milwaukee County Stadium. Sweetan did start the game, but was taken out and replaced with South in the first quarter due to the lingering effects of his injured ankle. South finished the game only 7 of 23 passing and with an average of 23 yards for his seven punts. South finished the season as a backup. South was later cut by New Orleans on July 29, 1969.
