= Creston Whitaker =

American football player (born 1947)

No. 86
- Position: Wide receiver

Personal information
- Born: August 12, 1947 (age 79); Quincy, Illinois, U.S.
- Listed height: 6 ft 2 in (1.88 m)
- Listed weight: 187 lb (85 kg)

Career information
- High school: Jacksonville (Jacksonville, Illinois)
- College: Southern Illinois (basketball); North Texas (basketball)

Career history
- Los Angeles Rams (1970–1971)*; New Orleans Saints (1971–1972)
- * Offseason or practice squad member only

Awards and highlights
- North Texas Athletics Hall of Fame (1994)

Career statistics
- Games played: 2 (Note: Pro-Football-Reference.com lists two games played in 1972. According to The Jacksonville Daily Journal, he played four games.)
- Receptions: 1
- Receiving yards: 6
- Stats at Pro Football Reference

Creston B. Whitaker (born August 12, 1947) is an American former professional football player who was a wide receiver for two seasons with the New Orleans Saints of the National Football League (NFL). He played college basketball for the Southern Illinois Salukis and North Texas Mean Green. After not playing football since high school, he was signed as an undrafted free agent by the Los Angeles Rams in 1970.

== Early life ==
Whitaker was born in Quincy, Illinois, on August 12, 1947. His family moved to Jacksonville, Illinois when he was 7 years old. At that time his father, Leroy, started Whitaker Sanitation Services. He first started athletics at Turner Junior High School. He then went to Jacksonville High School and excelled at baseball, basketball, football and track. He later focused on basketball, which he was considered best at, because it seemed as his best opportunity at a college scholarship. He was their leading scorer in the 1963–64 season, averaging over 14 points per game. He helped the 1964–65 team reach the state finals, but lost.

An article by The Jacksonville Daily Journal wrote "If one player has to be selected as being the standout of the team it has to be Whitaker of course. The almost-certain all-state selection threw in 70 points in three most recent games, on nights, 17, 25 and 28. Whitaker is an exciting type of player who can destroy an opposing team in a few minutes and do it in every way possible. Whitaker continually draws the raves of fans, players and coaches wherever he plays."

He finished his career as 23rd all-time in Jacksonville High School scoring. Following his senior year in 1965, Whitaker was named all-state in basketball, honorable mention all-state in football, and honorable mention all-state in baseball. He was inducted into the high school's Hall of Fame in 1983.

== College career ==
=== Southern Illinois ===
After being encouraged by high school coach Richard "Itchy" Jones, Whitaker accepted a scholarship offer from Southern Illinois University Carbondale in 1965. He played on their freshman team in his first year, being one of the team's leading scorers until suffering a broken ankle late in the season. The freshmen squad finished with a record of 14–1, only losing by five points to the Bradley freshmen. Even after suffering the injury, Whitaker "still kept his basketball handy and got a bit of shooting now and then despite a cast on his ankle." It was first thought to be a sprain, then a fracture, before it was later found out to be a brake. Whitaker said "They put the ankle in a cast a week later and I'll have to keep it on for another six weeks, but I can still shoot around and dribble, I'm just a little slower."

When asked about playing varsity the next season, Whitaker said, "It's going to be tough to play varsity ball next year, but I have hopes of making it. I don't expect to play a lot at first, but plan to play quite a bit before the year is over. I have a program laid out to work on this summer, about an hour and a half a day on a regular schedule, and hope that this will help my chances. A lot of this year's reserves are going to be back next season, but I hope I can move them out."

Whitaker was part of Southern Illinois' 1966–67 National Invitational Championship team, with Walt Frazier and Dick Garrett, both of whom would go on to play professionally in the National Basketball Association (NBA).

=== North Texas ===
After two seasons at Southern Illinois, Whitaker transferred to the University of North Texas. He would letter there from 1967 to 1970.

At North Texas he would earn All-Missouri Valley Conference honors for his high average of field goals. The Fort Worth Star-Telegram wrote "Joe Hamilton and Creston Whitaker continually pester opponents' offenses and puncture them with their shooting." In his senior year, the 1969–70 season, he was able to improve his scoring average to 16.9 through the first 20-season games. He shot at 40% from the field and 71% from the foul line. He rated fourth in rebounds with 109 retrievals. In a 93–81 double-overtime victory against the nationally ranked Drake, Whitaker ended with 25 points to help his team win. Whitaker was inducted into the North Texas athletics Hall of Fame in 1994.

== Professional career ==
=== Los Angeles Rams ===
Even though Whitaker hadn't played football since high school, he signed as an undrafted free agent with the Los Angeles Rams following his college graduation. He played wide receiver and scored his first touchdown in a preseason victory over the Cleveland Browns, on a four-yard pass from quarterback Karl Sweetan. Shortly afterwards he entered the United States Army and was placed on the military reserve list. Whitaker made a return to Los Angeles for the 1971 season. In an exhibition game against rookies of the San Diego Chargers, he caught four passes for 101 yards, including one touchdown from quarterback Dennis Dummit. He was later released during roster cuts.

=== New Orleans Saints ===
After being released by the Rams he was picked up by the New Orleans Saints. He left the Saints camp calling conditions that were not to his liking and problems in contract negotiations. In November, the Saints announced the signing of Whitaker along with defensive end Mike Walker. It was a two-year contract that he called "very pleasing". Whitaker commented, "Saints General Manager Vic Schwenk sent me a telegram here last Friday and I knew something was up. But I didn't know what it was and I was afraid to get my hopes up too high. Then he called me this morning and asked if I had stayed in shape. He told me the Saints had had some injuries and mentioned that what had happened before was unfortunate and he wanted to let bygones be bygones. He said that the Saints would take care of some additional expenses such as finding me a place to live and shipping my car to New Orleans. He said that the Saints wanted to activate me and that I would have to spend a few days or maybe a week on the taxi squad before they could put me on the regular roster. When I mentioned what had happened before, he said they wanted me to come back down and he could clear it up. I plan to sign for this year and next season when I get to New Orleans Tuesday afternoon."

Before his return to the Saints he had planned on getting a job with the NCAA. "I would have enjoyed that job, but playing ball comes first. The Rams had tried to work out a deal to put me on their taxi squad but I really didn't feel I wanted to do that. I wanted to play and should have that chance now." Whitaker also stated that he planned trying out with the St. Louis Cardinals or Chicago Bears before he was signed by the Saints.

With the Saints in 1971, he spent most of the season on the taxi squad, but was activated to the roster for the final two games, against the Cleveland Browns and Atlanta Falcons. Against Cleveland, he recorded his first two career receptions, of five and nine yards. "The Saints' biggest problem is lack of speed and I think I can help them out there. I was the fastest on the club in the 40, with a best time of 4.4 seconds. Two others had 4.6 second times," he said.

In his second season, Whitaker did not make the roster and was sent to the taxi squad. He was upset with the decision, saying "Right now I am real, real bitter about being put on the taxi squad. I was very stunned when I was notified because just one week before Roberts had told me that he would keep four wide receivers and I would be one of them. They ended up keeping Margene Adkins, Dan Abramowicz and Bob Newland. It is possible I will be activated, but right now I am quite upset about the situation. I felt they hid me during the pre-season games. They keep statistics through all the practice sessions and I caught 15 more passes than the next closest- Adkins. I caught 77 to his 62 passes. Then in the six pre-season games I played only the equivalent of three quarters and caught five passes for over 90 yards and one touchdown. I definitely felt that what I had done in that time was comparable or better than any of the other wide receivers." He was promoted to the active roster against the Minnesota Vikings. He recorded one catch for six yards. He was then reverted to the taxi squad and would stay there until week 14, against the Green Bay Packers. It would be his final career game, as he was reverted and retired the following season after an injury.
