= Greg Knafelc =

American football player (born 1959)

No. 40
- Position: Quarterback

Personal information
- Born: February 20, 1959 (age 67); Green Bay, Wisconsin, U.S.
- Listed height: 6 ft 4 in (1.93 m)
- Listed weight: 220 lb (100 kg)

Career information
- High school: Premontre (Green Bay)
- College: Notre Dame
- NFL draft: 1981: undrafted

Career history
- Green Bay Packers (1981)*; New Orleans Saints (1982–1983); Green Bay Packers (1984)*
- * Offseason or practice squad member only

Awards and highlights
- National champion (1977)

Career NFL statistics
- Games played: 6
- Stats at Pro Football Reference

Gregory Kurt Knafelc (born February 20, 1959 ) is an American former professional football player who was a quarterback in the National Football League (NFL). He played for the New Orleans Saints in 1983. He played college football for the Notre Dame Fighting Irish. He is the son of former Green Bay Packers player Gary Knafelc.

== See also ==
- List of New Orleans Saints players
