= Steve O'Neal =

American football player (born 1946)

No. 20, 10
- Position: Punter

Personal information
- Born: February 4, 1946 (age 80); Hearne, Texas, U.S.
- Listed height: 6 ft 3 in (1.91 m)
- Listed weight: 185 lb (84 kg)

Career information
- High school: Hearne
- College: Texas A&M (1965–1968)
- NFL draft: 1969: 13th round, 338th overall pick

Career history
- New York Jets (1969–1972); New Orleans Saints (1973)

Awards and highlights
- First-team All-SWC (1968); NFL record: Longest punt: 98 yards (1969)

Career NFL/AFL statistics
- Punts: 337
- Punting yards: 13,725
- Longest punt: 98
- Stats at Pro Football Reference

Stephen James O'Neal (born February 4, 1946) is an American former professional football player who was a punter in the American Football League (AFL) and National Football League (NFL). He played college football for the Texas A&M Aggies. O'Neal is best known for kicking a 98-yard punt during the AFL game between the New York Jets and Denver Broncos on September 21, 1969. This punt set the record for the longest punt in AFL and NFL history. He finished his career with 337 punts for 13,725 yards and a 40.7 yards per punt average.

== Professional career ==
O'Neal was selected in the 13th round, 338th overall pick of the 1969 Common draft by the AFL's New York Jets. O'Neal was traded by the Jets to the New Orleans Saints before the 1973 season along with backup quarterback Bob Davis in exchange for wide receiver Margene Adkins and punter Julian Fagan. Jets' coach Weeb Ewbank said of the trade that "We've been disappointed with our punting game which is the reason for this trade," although Fagan only lasted one year with the Jets. He set a career-high with 81 punts in his final season for the New Orleans Saints in 1973. After struggling during the 1974 preseason, he was waived by the Saints before the 1974 regular season began and replaced by Donnie Gibbs, who himself was waived after the first regular season game and replaced by Tom Blanchard.

== See also ==
- List of American Football League players
