= Donnie Gibbs =

American football player (born 1945)

No. 15
- Position: Punter

Personal information
- Born: December 31, 1945; Tyler, Texas
- Died: February 21, 2006 (aged 60)
- Listed height: 6 ft 2 in (1.88 m)
- Listed weight: 205 lb (93 kg)

Career information
- High school: Robert E. Lee High School
- College: TCU
- NFL draft: 1968: undrafted

Career history
- New Orleans Saints (1974)

Career NFL statistics
- Punts: 3
- Punting yards: 99
- Average punt: 33
- Inside 20: 2
- Stats at Pro Football Reference

Donald Ray Gibbs was an American professional football punter who played college football for TCU Horned Frogs and played professionally for the New Orleans Saints of the NFL.

Gibbs born on December 31, 1945, to Clyde and Frances Gibbs. He played high school football at Robert E. Lee High School where he not only punted but also played quarterback. In 1963 he led Robert E. Lee to its first winning record in football. In 1965 he won the Troy V. Post Award as "1965 Young Texan of the Year."

Gibbs said of becoming TCU's punter "I feel like a freak, standing off to one side of the field and just kicking the ball. It's a little boring and I miss playing quarterback. But if this is the best way I can help the team, then I'm for it. At TCU Gibbs was not only the team's punter but also the holder for placekicker Bruce Alford. Alford, who played several years in the NFL, said of Gibbs "Donnie knows just how I like the ball to sit. He has sure, quick hands and takes the snap and gets it down in a hurry...It's like a quarterback who gets used to taking a snapback from one center. It sure would upset me if I didn't have Donnie." In 1966, he was named to the Fort Worth Star-Telegram All-Southwest Conference Team after recording a 43.1 yard per punt average through 9 games. After college Gibbs played quarterback and punter for the Fort Worth Braves of the Texas Football League from 1968 through 1971.

Gibbs played for the Saints in 1974. He asked for a tryout as a 29 year old and beat out Steve O'Neal – holder of the NFL record for longest punt ever – for the punting job. Gibbs had spent the prior two years selling women's clothing. His first game with the Saints was against the San Francisco 49ers and started well as he executed two coffin corner kicks to pin the 49ers deep in their own zone. But disaster struck late in the game when he fumbled a perfect snap to set up the 49ers' winning score. Gibbs said of the play "I just flat dropped it. I wasn't concentrating on fielding the snap. I went in there and didn't do my first job, catch the ball." He was waived by the Saints before their next game and replaced by veteran Tom Blanchard.

Gibbs died on February 21, 2006, in Pennsylvania at the age of 60. He was survived by three daughters and a son.
