= Dave McCormick (American football) =

American football player (1943–1986)

No. 71, 73
- Position: Offensive tackle

Personal information
- Born: July 10, 1943; Winnsboro, Louisiana, U.S.
- Died: March 17, 1986 (aged 42); Monroe, Louisiana, U.S.
- Listed height: 6 ft 6 in (1.98 m)
- Listed weight: 250 lb (113 kg)

Career information
- High school: Rayville (LA)
- College: LSU (1962-1965)
- NFL draft: 1965: 5th round, 58th overall pick
- AFL draft: 1965: Red Shirt 1st round, 7th overall pick

Career history
- San Francisco 49ers (1966); New Orleans Saints (1967)

Awards and highlights
- First-team All-SEC (1965)

Career NFL statistics
- Games played: 16
- Stats at Pro Football Reference

David Oliver McCormick (July 10, 1943 – March 17, 1986) was an American professional football player who played tackle in the National Football League (NFL). He played in the NFL for two seasons, one each with the San Francisco 49ers and New Orleans Saints, the latter of which he was a part of their inaugural season roster. He played in a total of 16 games: 14 with the 49ers and two with the Saints.

McCormick was born in Winnsboro, Louisiana, and attended Rayville High School in Rayville, Louisiana. He attended Louisiana State University, where he played college football for the LSU Tigers football team. In 1965, he was selected as a first-team All-Southeastern Conference player by the Associated Press and UPI.
