= Dick Anderson (American football, born 1944) =

American football player (born 1944)

No. 71
- Position: Tackle

Personal information
- Born: January 26, 1944 (age 82); Massillon, Ohio, U.S.
- Listed height: 6 ft 5 in (1.96 m)
- Listed weight: 245 lb (111 kg)

Career information
- High school: Lodi (OH)
- College: Ohio State
- NFL draft: 1967: undrafted

Career history
- New Orleans Saints (1967)

Career NFL statistics
- Games played: 2
- Stats at Pro Football Reference

Richard Joseph Anderson (born January 26, 1944) is an American former professional football player who was a tackle for the New Orleans Saints of the National Football League in 1967. He played college football for the Ohio State Buckeyes. During his brief NFL career, Anderson played in two games and scored two points on a safety.
