= Gary Cuozzo =

American football player (born 1941)

No. 15
- Position: Quarterback

Personal information
- Born: April 26, 1941 (age 85); Montclair, New Jersey, U.S.
- Listed height: 6 ft 0 in (1.83 m)
- Listed weight: 195 lb (88 kg)

Career information
- High school: Glen Ridge (NJ)
- College: Virginia
- NFL draft: 1963: undrafted

Career history
- Baltimore Colts (1963–1966); New Orleans Saints (1967); Minnesota Vikings (1968–1971); St. Louis Cardinals (1972)

Awards and highlights
- NFL champion (1969)

Career NFL statistics
- Passing attempts: 1,182
- Passing completions: 584
- Completion percentage: 49.4%
- TD–INT: 43–55
- Passing yards: 7,402
- Passer rating: 62.1
- Stats at Pro Football Reference

Gary Samuel Cuozzo (born April 26, 1941) is an American former professional football player who was a quarterback for ten seasons, from 1963 to 1972, in the National Football League (NFL). He played college football for the Virginia Cavaliers. After football, he had a career as an orthodontist, and spoke publicly to youth about the dangers of drug abuse, after the death of his son in a drug related shooting.

== Early life ==
Born in Montclair, New Jersey, Cuozzo grew up in Glen Ridge and lettered in football, basketball, and track at Glen Ridge High School, from which he graduated with honors in 1959. He received All-State recognition as a football and basketball player, and he led both teams to state championships in 1958. In 1959, Cuozzo won individual state titles in discus and shot put.

== Football career ==
=== University of Virginia ===
Cuozzo was widely recruited and received a scholarship to the University of Virginia in Charlottesville, and played quarterback for the Cavaliers from 1960 to 1962. He was named the UPI “Back of the Week” on multiple occasions in 1961 and 1962. Cuozzo was a pre-med student, had a 3.68 grade point average, was a member of the Dean's list, and graduated Phi Beta Kappa. He was the quarterback for the South in the North-South college all-star game in 1962, and was an academic All-American.

=== Baltimore Colts ===
An undrafted quarterback after graduating from the University of Virginia, Cuozzo was signed as a free agent by head coach Weeb Ewbank of the Baltimore Colts. He unexpectedly made the team, in large part because his intelligence matched his physical skills. Cuozzo began his NFL career with the Colts as a backup to legend Johnny Unitas. In 1963, he roomed with childhood hero, future Pro Football Hall of Fame receiver Raymond Berry, who taught Cuozzo how to work on timing his passes. The pair later held summer camps for children along with Green Bay Packers receiver Carroll Dale.

When Unitas was injured in 1965, Cuozzo replaced him and in his first start set a new NFL record for most touchdown passes in one game, with five (two to Jimmy Orr and one each to Berry, hall of famer Lenny Moore, and Willie Richardson). After Cuozzo was sidelined by injury as well a few games later (which required shoulder surgery), head coach Don Shula resorted to using running back Tom Matte as quarterback, all the way to the Western Conference championship game (tiebreaker playoff) against the Packers.

=== New Orleans Saints ===
After being Unitas's backup again in 1966, Cuozzo asked to be traded. On March 6, 1967, the Colts traded Cuozzo to the expansion New Orleans Saints. The Colts gave up Butch Allison and their 1967 seventeenth round pick to the Saints in exchange for the first pick in the 1967 draft, a 1967 third round pick, a 1969 seventh round pick, and center Bill Curry. Cuozzo was not the Saints' first starting quarterback (Billy Kilmer was the first), but he started 10 of the 14 games the team played during its inaugural season.

The trade turned out badly for New Orleans, but great for Baltimore. Cuozzo only played one season with the Saints, and Allison was cut at the end of training camp. Billy Bob Stewart, who was drafted in the 17th round, was cut shortly after the beginning of training camp. The Colts used the first overall pick in the 1967 NFL/AFL draft to select Michigan State All-American Bubba Smith, who became an All-Pro three times and was Baltimore's starting left defensive end in Super Bowl III and V. Curry was an All-Pro center for the Colts in 1971 and 1972, and was the starting center for the Colts in Super Bowls III and V. The Colts used the other 1967 draft pick (in the seventh round), to select an offensive lineman named Norman Davis who played one season in Baltimore and later played for the Saints.

=== Minnesota Vikings ===
After losing the Saints' starting job later in 1967 to Billy Kilmer, Cuozzo was traded to the Minnesota Vikings in January 1968. He became the Vikings' starting quarterback in 1970 when Joe Kapp, the team's Most Valuable Player in 1969, held out and was traded to the Boston Patriots. In his first game as a Viking, Cuozzo led the team to a 27–10 victory over the Kansas City Chiefs in a rematch of Super Bowl IV. Cuozzo was named the NFC Player of the Week in a week 7 game against the Detroit Lions. He led the Vikings to the NFL Central Division championship.

The 1970 Vikings posted the NFL's best regular season record at 12–2, but lost in an NFC Divisional playoff game to the San Francisco 49ers at home. The 1971 Vikings used three different starting quarterbacks. Cuozzo started 8 of the team's 14 games, with Bob Lee (who was also the team's punter) starting 4 and Norm Snead starting 2. The Vikings had an outstanding regular season record, finishing 11–3 and topping the NFC Central Division. Lee started the Viking's first-round playoff game at home, but Cuozzo came off the bench in the second half. The eventual Super Bowl champion Dallas Cowboys won the game 20-12. During the ensuing off-season, Cuozzo was traded to the Saint Louis Cardinals for wide receiver John Gilliam and two 1973 draft picks.

=== St. Louis Cardinals ===
Cardinals coach Bob Hollway was familiar with Cuozzo, having served as Minnesota's defensive coordinator under Bud Grant prior to leaving for St. Louis in 1971. Cuozzo was part of a chaotic four-quarterback rotation with Jim Hart (started three games), Pete Beathard, and Tim Van Galder (started five games) in 1972, with Cuozzo starting six games, but when Don Coryell took over as Cardinals coach in 1973, he named Hart the undisputed starter, and he would hold the job fulltime to 1980, and then part time until 1983.

== After football ==
Cuozzo's father Pasquale was a dentist, and his brother Jack would become an orthodontist. In between NFL seasons, Cuozzo studied dentistry at the University of Tennessee and orthodontics at Loyola University of Chicago. Following his retirement from football, Cuozzo moved to Middletown Township, New Jersey, to start an orthodontics practice, which he operated for 28 years.

In 1990, his oldest son Gary Jr., a/k/a Chip, was murdered in Miami during a drug deal, and Cuozzo later began speaking to teens in high schools about avoiding drugs. Much of what he said came from what he learned spending time with Raymond Berry, and Berry's faith and deep care for others. Cuozzo served as national chairman of the Fellowship of Christian Athletes from 1995 to 1998.
