= Charlie Brown (running back) =

American football player (born 1945)

No. 22
- Position: Running back

Personal information
- Born: October 16, 1945 (age 81); Jefferson City, Missouri, U.S.
- Listed height: 5 ft 10 in (1.78 m)
- Listed weight: 195 lb (88 kg)

Career information
- High school: Jefferson City
- College: Missouri
- NFL draft: 1967: 10th round, 238th overall pick

Career history
- New Orleans Saints (1967–1968); BC Lions (1969–1970)

Awards and highlights
- Consensus High School All-American (1963 Jefferson City Jays football team); First-team All-Big Eight (1965); Second-team All-Big Eight (1966)

Career NFL statistics
- Rushing attempts–yards: 8–16
- Receptions–yards: 3–23
- Touchdowns: 3
- Stats at Pro Football Reference

Charles Robert Brown (born October 16, 1945) is an American former professional football player who was a running back in the National Football League (NFL). He played college football for the Missouri Tigers. He went on to play with the New Orleans Saints from 1967 to 1968.

Following his NFL career, Brown played two additional seasons in the Canadian Football League with the BC Lions.

== Personal life ==
Brown's half-brother Don Webb played defensive back for the Boston Patriots in the 1960s. They were raised in the same household, but because of age difference, their first chance to play against each other in a football game came in a 1968 preseason game between the Patriots and Saints.
