= Riley Mattson =

American football player (born 1938)

No. 73, 75
- Position: Tackle

Personal information
- Born: December 18, 1938 (age 87); Portland, Oregon, U.S.
- Listed height: 6 ft 4 in (1.93 m)
- Listed weight: 252 lb (114 kg)

Career information
- High school: Grant (OR)
- College: Oregon
- NFL draft: 1961: 11th round, 143rd overall pick

Career history
- Washington Redskins (1961–1964); Chicago Bears (1966)

Career NFL statistics
- Games played: 68
- Fumble recoveries: 3
- Stats at Pro Football Reference

Riley Carl Mattson (born December 18, 1938) is an American former professional football player who was an offensive tackle in the National Football League (NFL) for the Washington Redskins and the Chicago Bears. He played college football for the Oregon Ducks.
