= George Harvey (American football) =

American football player (born 1945)

No. 67
- Position: Offensive tackle

Personal information
- Born: August 18, 1945 (age 81); Topeka, Kansas, U.S.
- Listed height: 6 ft 4 in (1.93 m)
- Listed weight: 245 lb (111 kg)

Career information
- High school: Parsons (KS)
- College: Kansas (1963-1966)
- NFL draft: 1967: 6th round, 134th overall pick

Career history
- New Orleans Saints (1967)

Career NFL statistics
- Games played: 6
- Games started: 4
- Fumble recoveries: 1
- Stats at Pro Football Reference

George Everett Harvey (born August 18, 1945) is an American former professional football player who was a tackle for the New Orleans Saints of the National Football League (NFL). He played college football for the Kansas Jayhawks.
