= Number One (1969 film) =

1969 American film drama by Tom Gries

- Directed by: Tom Gries
- Written by: David Moessinger
- Produced by: Walter Seltzer
- Starring: Charlton Heston; Jessica Walter; Bruce Dern; John Randolph; Diana Muldaur; Mike Henry; G.D. Spradlin; Al Hirt; Bobby Troup; Steve Franken; Roy Jenson; Richard Elkins; Ernie Barnes
- Cinematography: Michel Hugo
- Edited by: Richard K. Brockway
- Music by: Dominic Frontiere
- Distributed by: United Artists
- Release date: August 21, 1969
- Running time: 100 min. (UK); 105 min. (TCM print)
- Country: United States
- Language: English
- Budget: $1,100,000
- Box office: $1 million (US/ Canada rental)

Number One is a 1969 American sports drama film released by United Artists and directed by Tom Gries.

The film stars Charlton Heston as Ron "Cat" Catlan, aging quarterback for American professional football's New Orleans Saints, and Jessica Walter as his wife. Musician Al Hirt plays himself as do several real-life members of the 1968 Saints. The football scenes were shot at Tulane Stadium, the Saints' then-home field.

== Plot ==
Ron "Cat" Catlan once led the New Orleans Saints to a championship and is heralded by his teammates, coaches, and sportswriters as an all-time great quarterback. After 15 years in pro football, his skills have declined and he struggles with repeated injuries, though he continues to believe that he is the best in the game. Cat tries to compensate for his failing skills with booze and an extramarital affair. ("You're not even worth the price of a ticket anymore", a fan yells at him after Cat refuses her an autograph.)

Friend and former teammate Richie Fowler (Bruce Dern) offers Cat a job with his auto-leasing company, and a management position in the computer industry is also on the table, but Catlan hesitates, insisting he can still lead the squad to future glory. The associate with the computer firm (Bobby Troup) warns him not to put off making a decision: "There are a lot of kids coming out of college, Cat, and they're smart kids. A year from now, I might not be able to offer you a job driving the company truck."

Things are no better at home for Catlan: his long-suffering wife, Julie (Jessica Walter), threatens to leave him after too many alcohol-fueled outrages and late nights with other women. She begins to drift away into her own life, leading Cat to an abortive affair with Ann (Diana Muldaur).

Cat finally begs Julie to stay, saying everything will be all right after he leads the Saints to another title. In the next game, against the Dallas Cowboys, Catlan succeeds in leading the Saints down the field, even scoring a touchdown himself. In the end, though, he is crushed in a violent sack by three Cowboys players, seemingly ending his football career and possibly his very life, as Catlan takes what appears to be his last breath. Julie, unable to watch, leaves the stadium.

== Filming ==
Despite having All-Pro signal-caller Billy Kilmer as an instructor, Charlton Heston did not make a very convincing pro quarterback. "I marveled at how skinny he was in a Saints uniform", said local DJ Bob Walker, who was an extra in the movie. "It hung on him like a cheap suit three sizes too big. When the cameras weren't rolling we watched him try to throw some passes. His receiver was 10–20 yards away and his alleged passes didn't come close." Joe Wendryhoski, who basically played himself in the film as the Saints center, called Heston "a great guy, very sociable" who "didn't have an athletic bone in his body. As a quarterback, he left a lot to be desired."

In the final scene when Catlan is crushed by the Dallas defense (portrayed by Saints players Mike Tilleman, Dave Rowe, and Fred Whittingham), neither Heston nor the producer felt the hit on him was realistic enough, so Heston asked them to cut loose to really make it look authentic. On the second take, the trio slammed the actor to the ground, breaking three of his ribs.

== Reaction ==
Number One was a commercial failure, but critical reaction was mixed. In a rave review, Howard Thompson of The New York Times wrote that the film was "consistently engrossing" and "a succinct, stinging and often strong gridiron drama," and called Heston's performance "a brooding, scorching and beautifully disciplined tour de force for the actor," adding that, "[i]f Heston could have been better, we don't know how."

== Production ==
Plans for the film were announced in 1966 to be made by the same team as The War Lover.

The National Football League permitted the New Orleans Saints' name and jerseys to be used as opposed to many football films featuring professional teams with fictional names. However, this led to historical inaccuracies in the film, particularly in flashbacks of Catlan's career. One flashback scene shows Catlan's first game as a rookie for the Saints in what would've been the early 1950s; however, the Saints were founded in 1966 and began play the following season. Another flashback shows Catlan's and the team's celebrating a championship victory; however, the Saints did not win a championship at any point before the film was shot (or indeed, for several decades afterwards, their first title coming in 2010 (2009 season) at Super Bowl XLIV, more than 40 years after the film was made).

The music was composed by Dominic Frontiere, future husband of Los Angeles Rams owner Georgia Frontiere.

Number One was released on VHS in the early 1980s, but was quickly deleted; MGM released the film on DVD on November 12, 2015.

== See also ==
- List of American films of 1969
- List of American football films
