= Ted Davis (American football) =

American football player (1942–2019)

No. 35, 54
- Position: Linebacker

Personal information
- Born: July 27, 1942; Memphis, Tennessee, U.S.
- Died: November 7, 2019 (aged 77); Atlanta, Georgia, U.S.
- Listed height: 6 ft 1 in (1.85 m)
- Listed weight: 232 lb (105 kg)

Career information
- High school: Memphis (TN) Messick
- College: Georgia Tech (1960-1963)
- NFL draft: 1964: 4th round, 50th overall pick
- AFL draft: 1964: 1st round, 8th overall pick

Career history
- Baltimore Colts (1964–1966); New Orleans Saints (1967–1969); Oakland Raiders (1970)*; Miami Dolphins (1970)
- * Offseason or practice squad member only

Awards and highlights
- Georgia Tech Hall of Fame (1980)

Career NFL statistics
- Fumble recoveries: 3
- Interceptions: 2
- Sacks: 1
- Stats at Pro Football Reference

Richard Kenneth Davis (July 27, 1942 – November 7, 2019) was an American professional football linebacker in the National Football League (NFL). He was drafted by both the San Diego Chargers of the AFL and the Baltimore Colts of the NFL in 1964 but chose to play for the Colts. Ted was then drafted by the Saints in the 1967 NFL expansion draft and was one of the original New Orleans Saints players. He played for the New Orleans Saints from 1967 to 1969 and he finished his career with the Miami Dolphins in 1970. He was also a football actor in the 1969 Charlton Heston movie Number One featuring the New Orleans Saints.

Ted played collegiately at the wide receiver/end position from 1961 to 1963 for Georgia Tech and was inducted into the Georgia Tech Hall of Fame in 1980. He recorded 19 receptions for 324 yards while in college.

During his senior year, he was involved in an incident during the Georgia Tech / Auburn game on October 19, 1963, in which he kicked Auburn halfback David Rawson in the face during the fourth quarter. The officials penalized Ted Davis and Rawson ended up having to go to the hospital. The following Monday, Ted Davis publicly apologized and owned up to his mistake made in anger during the game. He submitted his resignation to Coach Bobby Dodd and the Georgia Tech football team wishing to save Georgia Tech from the embarrassment of having to kick him off the team. He admitted that his actions violated every standard Coach Dodd had set for the team and he asked for Rawson's forgiveness. Ted was well respected at Georgia Tech and owned up to his mistake.

This incident was reminiscent of the so-called "Chick Granning-Darwin Holt Incident" from the Georgia Tech / Alabama game two years earlier but the outcomes were quite different. During this incident "an Alabama player damaged a Tech player in the heat of battle" by elbowing him in the face. Apparently this elbowing incident by Holt resulted in Granning being hospitalized and unable to play football for the rest of the year. Holt apologized for the incident but no further action was taken by the SEC or Alabama and he remained on the team.

Ted Davis worked as a Football Umpire in the SEC from 1984 until at least 1989. In 1980, he became a veterinarian in Knoxville, TN where he owned his own clinic until retiring in 2010.
