= Dave Szymakowski =

American football player (born 1946)

No. 88, 87
- Position: Wide receiver

Personal information
- Born: March 15, 1946 (age 80); Bethlehem, Pennsylvania, U.S.
- Died: November 3, 2024 (aged 78); Easton, Pennsylvania, U.S.
- Listed height: 6 ft 2 in (1.88 m)
- Listed weight: 198 lb (90 kg)

Career information
- High school: Liberty (Bethlehem)
- College: West Texas A&M (1964-1967)
- NFL draft: 1968: 3rd round, 59th overall pick

Career history
- New Orleans Saints (1968); Richmond Roadrunners / Saints (1969-1970); Southern California Sun (1974)
- Stats at Pro Football Reference

David John Szymakowski (born March 15, 1946) is an American former professional football wide receiver in the National Football League (NFL) who played for the New Orleans Saints. He was drafted in the third round with the 59th overall pick in the 1968 NFL draft by the Saints. He played college football at West Texas A&M University.
