= Ross Gwinn =

American football player (1944–2016)

No. 62
- Position: Guard

Personal information
- Born: July 25, 1944; Deport, Texas, U.S.
- Died: February 2, 2016 (aged 71); Natchitoches, Louisiana, U.S.
- Listed height: 6 ft 3 in (1.91 m)
- Listed weight: 272 lb (123 kg)

Career information
- High school: Natchitoches Central
- College: Northwestern State
- NFL draft: 1967: undrafted

Career history
- Baltimore Colts (1967)*; New Orleans Saints (1968–1969); Edmonton Eskimos (1971)
- * Offseason or practice squad member only

Career NFL statistics
- Games played: 2
- Games started: 0
- Stats at Pro Football Reference

Charles Ross Gwinn (July 25, 1944 – February 2, 2016) is an American former professional football player who was a guard for the New Orleans Saints of National Football League (NFL). He played college football for the Northwestern State University.

He was originally signed by the Baltimore Colts in 1967 after going undrafted and was assigned to the Colts' taxi squad. After spending the entire 1967 season on the Colts' taxi squad, he was released by the Colts in 1968 and signed with the Saints. He spent much of the 1968 season on the Saints' taxi squad but did play in two games for the Saints. He was cut by the Saints prior to the 1969 season.

In 1971 he signed to play with the Edmonton Eskimos of the Canadian Football League and served as their starting right guard that season.
