= Bo Burris =

American football player (born 1944)

No. 16
- Position: Safety

Personal information
- Born: October 16, 1944 (age 82); Luling, Texas, U.S.
- Listed height: 6 ft 3 in (1.91 m)
- Listed weight: 195 lb (88 kg)

Career information
- High school: Brazosport (Freeport, Texas)
- College: Houston (1963–1966)
- NFL draft: 1967: 2nd round, 27th overall pick

Career history
- New Orleans Saints (1967–1969); Philadelphia Eagles (1970)*
- * Offseason or practice squad member only

Career NFL statistics
- Interceptions: 4
- Fumble recoveries: 3
- Touchdowns: 1
- Stats at Pro Football Reference

James England "Bo" Burris Jr. (born October 16, 1944) is an American former professional football player who was a safety for three seasons with the New Orleans Saints of the National Football League (NFL). He was selected by the Saints in the second round of the 1967 NFL/AFL draft. He played college football for the Houston Cougars as a quarterback.

== Early life ==
James England Burris Jr. was born on October 16, 1944, in Luling, Texas. He attended Brazosport High School in Freeport, Texas.

== College career ==
Burris was a member of the Houston Cougars from 1963 to 1966 as a quarterback. He was a three-year letterman from 1964 to 1966. He completed 24 of 61 passes (39.3%) for 326 yards, one touchdown, and nine interceptions in 1964 while also rushing for 154 yards and two touchdowns. In 1965, he totaled 81 completions on 175 passing attempts (46.3%) for 1,256 yards, 12 touchdowns, and 11 interceptions, and 81 rushing yards. As a senior in 1966, he recorded 98 completions on 204 attempts (48.0%) for 1,666 yards, 22 touchdowns, and 21 interceptions while also rushing for 180 yards and four touchdowns. His 22 passing touchdowns led the country that season while his 21 interceptions were the fourth-most in the country.

Burris also played for the Houston Cougars baseball team in 1967 as an outfielder, totaling one home run, one triple, 15 RBIs, and 11 runs while tying for the team-lead with 15 stolen bases. The Cougars advanced to the final round of the 1967 College World Series. He graduated from the University of Houston College of Business Administration. He was inducted into the University of Houston Athletics Hall of Honor in 1982.

== Professional career ==
Burris was selected by the New Orleans Saints in the second round, with the 27th overall pick, of the 1967 NFL draft as a defensive back. He officially signed with the team on July 7, 1967. He played in all 14 games, starting two at safety, for the Saints during the team's inaugural 1967 season and recovered one fumble. He appeared in all 14 games for the second straight season, starting 13, in 1968 and intercepted three passes for 129 yards and one touchdown while also recovering two fumbles. The Saints finished the 1968 season with a 4–9–1 record. Burris played in 12 games, starting seven, in 1969, recording one interception.

On May 4, 1970, Burris and Norman Davis were traded to the Philadelphia Eagles for Joe Scarpati and a 1971 tenth round draft pick. Burris was released on September 15, 1970.

== Personal life ==
After his football career, Burris started a landscaping company called Landscape Innovations. He appeared as an extra in the 1969 film Number One.

== See also ==
- List of NCAA major college football yearly passing leaders
