= Bruce Cortez =

American football player (born 1945)

No. 47
- Position: Defensive back

Personal information
- Born: October 29, 1945 (age 81); Carthage, Missouri, U.S.
- Listed height: 6 ft 0 in (1.83 m)
- Listed weight: 175 lb (79 kg)

Career information
- High school: Carthage
- College: Missouri Southern; Parsons
- NFL draft: 1967: 16th round, 419th overall pick

Career history
- New Orleans Saints (1967)
- Stats at Pro Football Reference

Bruce Ford Cortez (born October 29, 1945) is an American former professional football player who was a defensive back for the New Orleans Saints of the National Football League (NFL). He played college football for the Parsons Wildcats.
