= Eli Strand =

American football player (1943–2008)

No. 58, 61
- Position: Offensive lineman

Personal information
- Born: February 11, 1943; Bronxville, New York, U.S.
- Died: January 2, 2008 (aged 64); Bronxville, New York, U.S.
- Listed height: 6 ft 2 in (1.88 m)
- Listed weight: 250 lb (113 kg)

Career information
- High school: Tuckahoe (NY)
- College: Iowa State

Career history
- Green Bay Packers* (1965, PS); Pittsburgh Steelers (1966); New Orleans Saints (1967)
- * Offseason or practice squad member only
- Stats at Pro Football Reference

Eli S. Strand Jr. (February 11, 1943 – January 2, 2008), also known as Eli from Westchester, was an American professional football player who played offensive lineman for the Pittsburgh Steelers and New Orleans Saints. He was a taxi squad member of the 1965 NFL Champion Green Bay Packers in the year immediately preceding Super Bowl I.

In his later years, he was a frequent caller to sports radio station WFAN (AM) in New York City as "Eli from Westchester." He was known for invoking race into virtually every single phone call, infuriating the hosts, which often resulted in the hosts banning him from calling into the station. By his own admission, his penchant in looking for racism contributed to his early exit from the NFL. While with the Saints, he tried to organize several black players to take action against team management for better working conditions. He had limited clout as a marginal player on an expansion football team and found himself out of the league by the end of the year.

Strand died on January 2, 2008, at Lawrence Hospital in Bronxville, New York, following a brief illness.
