= Jimmy Jordan (running back) =

American football player (1944–2020)

No. 23, 45
- Position: Running back

Personal information
- Born: August 11, 1944; Glennville, Georgia, U.S.
- Died: April 20, 2020 (aged 75); Tampa, Florida, U.S.
- Listed height: 6 ft 1 in (1.85 m)
- Listed weight: 200 lb (91 kg)

Career information
- High school: George D. Chamberlain (Tampa)
- College: Florida (1963-1965)
- NFL draft: 1967: 3rd round, 57th overall pick

Career history
- Orange County Ramblers (1967); New Orleans Saints (1967); Alabama Hawks (1968)

Career NFL statistics
- Return yards: 56
- Stats at Pro Football Reference

Jimmy Andrew Jordan (August 11, 1944 – April 20, 2020) was an American football player who played for New Orleans Saints of the National Football League (NFL). After graduating from Chamberlain High School in 1963, he played college football at the University of Florida with then quarterback Steve Spurrier who referred to him as "Jumpin' Jimmy Jordan."
