= Gene Howard =

American football player (born 1946)

No. 21
- Position: Cornerback

Personal information
- Born: December 22, 1946 (age 79); Little Rock, Arkansas, U.S.
- Listed height: 6 ft 0 in (1.83 m)
- Listed weight: 190 lb (86 kg)

Career information
- High school: Scipio Jones (North Little Rock, Arkansas)
- College: Langston
- NFL draft: 1968: 7th round, 175th overall pick

Career history
- New Orleans Saints (1968–1970); Los Angeles Rams (1971–1972); Southern California Sun (1974)

Career NFL statistics
- Interceptions: 14
- Fumble recoveries: 4
- Total touchdowns: 2
- Stats at Pro Football Reference

Gene Howard (born December 22, 1946) is an American former professional football player who was a cornerback in the National Football League (NFL). He was selected by the New Orleans Saints in the seventh round of the 1968 NFL/AFL draft. He played college football for the Langston Lions.

Howard also played for the Los Angeles Rams.
