= Danny Abramowicz =

American football player and coach (born 1945)

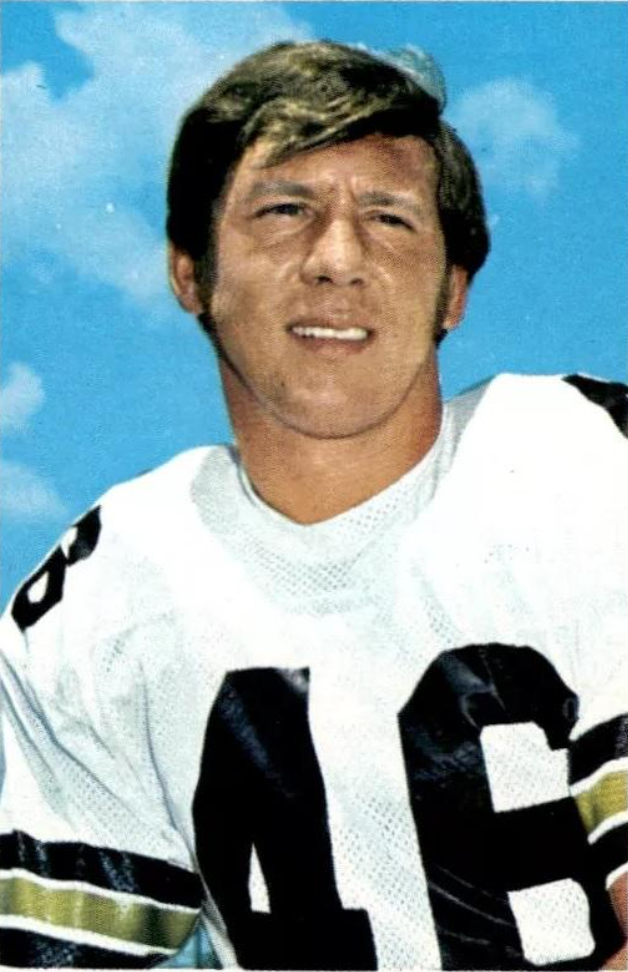
- Abramowicz c. 1970

No. 46
- Position: Wide receiver

Personal information
- Born: July 13, 1945 (age 81); Steubenville, Ohio, U.S.
- Listed height: 6 ft 1 in (1.85 m)
- Listed weight: 195 lb (88 kg)

Career information
- High school: Steubenville Catholic Central
- College: Xavier (1963–1966)
- NFL draft: 1967: 17th round, 420th overall pick

Career history

Playing
- New Orleans Saints (1967–1973); San Francisco 49ers (1973-1974)

Coaching
- Chicago Bears (1992–1996) Special teams coach; New Orleans Saints (1997–1999) Offensive coordinator

Awards and highlights
- First-team All-Pro (1969); NFL receptions leader (1969); New Orleans Saints Hall of Fame; Louisiana Sports Hall of Fame (1992); Xavier University Athletic Hall of Fame (1981); National Polish-American Sports Hall of Fame (1992)

Career NFL statistics
- Receptions: 369
- Receiving yards: 5,686
- Receiving touchdowns: 39
- Stats at Pro Football Reference
- Coaching profile at Pro Football Reference

Daniel Stanley Abramowicz (born July 13, 1945) is an American former professional football player who was a wide receiver in the National Football League (NFL). He played college football for the Xavier Musketeers. He played in the NFL for the New Orleans Saints and San Francisco 49ers. He was named a first-team All-Pro with the Saints in 1969, when he led the league in receptions. He became a coach after his playing career.

== Biography ==
=== Early life ===
Born in Steubenville, Ohio, Abramowicz is of Polish/Irish descent. He attended Steubenville Catholic Central High School. When he was a 5–10, 155-pound senior at Catholic Central, Abramowicz didn't attract much attention from college coaches. The only school that offered him a football scholarship was Xavier University in Cincinnati, Ohio.

He went to Xavier and, as a sophomore, caught 18 passes for 257 yards in his first varsity season.

His junior year, he finished with 50 catches for 738 yards and eight touchdowns, helping Xavier to an 8–2 season. That year Xavier knocked off Miami University, 29–28, Cincinnati, 14–3, and Dayton, 10–0. The Musketeers were all but bowl-bound until they dropped a 57–33 decision to Texas Western on the final day of the season despite a 53-yard touchdown reception by Abramowicz. At the conclusion of his junior year, he was named to the All-Catholic All-America team (The Brooklyn Tablet).

During his senior season, he continued as the favorite receiver of quarterback Carroll Williams, catching 34 passes for 585 yards and three touchdowns despite facing constant double coverage.

Abramowicz holds the XU records for passes caught in a season (50 in 1965) and in a career (102), receiving yards in a career (1,470), as well as touchdown passes caught in a season (eight in 1965) and in a career (13)

He graduated with a bachelor of science degree in Economics and Education in 1967.

=== NFL career ===
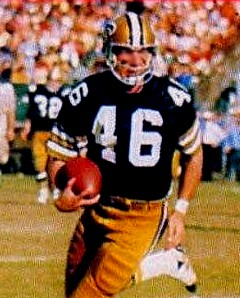
Abramowicz with the New Orleans Saints c. 1970

By his senior year, he had grown to 6–0, 190 pounds, but he still didn't attract much attention from pro scouts due to his lack of speed. Abramowicz was drafted by the Saints in the 17th round of the 1967 NFL/AFL draft with the 420th overall pick.

His career lasted from 1967 through 1974. Abramowicz broke into the starting lineup in the seventh game of the Saints’ first season with 12 catches for 156 yards in a 14–10 loss to the Pittsburgh Steelers.

Abramowicz had his most productive years while with the Saints. In 1968, 1969, and 1970, he ranked in the Top 10 in the NFL in two categories: receptions and receiving yards.

Additionally, in 1968 and 1972 he was Top 10 in receiving touchdowns. His best season is generally considered to be 1969 when he caught 73 passes for 1,015 yards to go along with seven touchdowns. For his efforts, he was voted as an All-Pro by the Sporting News and Associated Press. The 1972 season would turn out to be Abramowicz's last full season with the Saints.

Two games into the 1973 season, he was traded to the 49ers, playing two sub-par seasons. Abramowicz attempted to catch on in 1975, reporting to camp with George Allen's "Over the Hill Gang", the Washington Redskins. However, he did not make the final roster.

Over his career, he played 111 games, caught 369 passes for 5,686 yards, and 39 touchdowns.

Upon his retirement, he held the NFL record for catching at least one pass in consecutive games: 105 (doing so from October 29, 1967 to December 15, 1975). The previous record was 93 (Bobby Joe Conrad).

=== After retirement ===
After his playing career, Abramowicz worked in private business in New Orleans. He also spent five years as an analyst for Saints games broadcast on radio. In 1992, he was hired by Chicago Bears head coach Mike Ditka to serve as special teams coach. He served in this capacity from 1992 to 1996. In 1997, when Ditka was hired as head coach for the Saints, Abramowicz came back to the Saints as offensive coordinator. He has been out of the NFL since Ditka was fired in 1999.

Abramowicz is a devout Roman Catholic, and is active with various organizations and foundations dedicated to philanthropic causes. He is also a writer, author of Spiritual Workout of a Former Saint.

Since September 2008, Abramowicz has been hosting his own television show "Crossing the Goal" on the Catholic television network EWTN. Promotional materials from the network indicate the program uses "a sports show format to encourage men to get into spiritual shape." He also serves on the Board of Directors of EWTN. He serves in an advisory capacity to the board of directors of National Fellowship of Catholic Men. He travels throughout the United States speaking at Catholic men's conferences.

He and his wife, Claudia, married in 1970 and had three children and four grandsons. Claudia died on August 2, 2022.

Xavier University has presented him with the two most prestigious awards bestowed on a student athlete—Legion of Honor and Athletic Hall of Fame (1981).

Abramowicz was inducted into the New Orleans Saints Hall of Fame in 1988. He was also inducted into both the National Polish-American Sports Hall of Fame and Louisiana Sports Hall of Fame in 1992.

== NFL career statistics ==
Legend
	Led the league
**Bold**	Career high

=== Regular season ===
Year	Team	Games		Receiving				
Year	Team	GP	GS	Rec	Yds	Avg	Lng	TD
1967	NO	**14**	10	50	721	14.4	**80**	6
1968	NO	**14**	**14**	54	890	16.5	47	**7**
1969	NO	**14**	**14**	**73**	**1,015**	13.9	49	**7**
1970	NO	**14**	**14**	55	906	16.5	48	5
1971	NO	**14**	**14**	37	657	**17.8**	63	5
1972	NO	13	13	38	668	17.6	51	**7**
1973	NO	2	2	2	18	9.0	11	0
1973	SF	12	11	35	442	12.6	54	1
1974	SF	**14**	**14**	25	369	14.8	30	1
Career		111	106	369	5,686	15.4	80	39
