= John Douglas (defensive back) =

American football player (1945–2011)

No. 21
- Position: Defensive back

Personal information
- Born: January 12, 1945; Fort Worth, Texas, U.S.
- Died: September 25, 2011 (aged 66); Fort Worth, Texas, U.S.
- Listed height: 6 ft 1 in (1.85 m)
- Listed weight: 195 lb (88 kg)

Career information
- High school: Como (Fort Worth)
- College: Texas Southern (1963–1966)
- NFL draft: 1967: 5th round, 133rd overall pick

Career history
- New Orleans Saints (1967–1968); Houston Oilers (1969–1970); San Francisco 49ers (1972)*
- * Offseason or practice squad member only

Career NFL/AFL statistics
- Interceptions: 1
- Fumble recoveries: 1
- Stats at Pro Football Reference

John Henry Douglas Jr. (January 12, 1945 – September 25, 2011) was an American professional football player who was a defensive back for two seasons with the New Orleans Saints of the National Football League (NFL). He was selected by the Saints in the fifth round of the 1967 NFL/AFL draft after playing college football for the Texas Southern Tigers. Douglas also played for the Houston Oilers of the American Football League (AFL).

== Early life and college ==
John Henry Douglas Jr. was born on January 12, 1945, in Fort Worth, Texas. He attended Como High School in Fort Worth.

He was a member of the Tigers of Texas Southern University from 1963 to 1966 as a quarterback.

== Professional career ==
Douglas was selected by the New Orleans Saints in the fifth round, with the 133rd overall pick, of the 1967 NFL/AFL draft. He played in all 14 games, starting 13, for the Saints during the team's inaugural 1967 season, totaling one interception, one fumble recovery, one kick return for 17 yards, and two punt returns for 15 yards. The Saints finished the season with a 3–11 record. Douglas started all 14 games during the 1968 season, returning one kick for ten yards, as the Saints went 4–9–1. He was released on September 16, 1969.

Douglas was then signed by the Houston Oilers of the American Football League (AFL). He appeared in eight games, starting five, for the team in 1969. He was placed on injured reserve in 1970 and did not play in any games that year. He was released by the Oilers in 1971.

Douglas signed with the San Francisco 49ers in 1972, but was later released.

== Personal life ==
Douglas died on September 25, 2011, in Hurst, Texas after a four-year bout with cancer.
