= Walter Roberts (American football) =

American football player (born 1942)

No. 27, 47
- Position: Wide receiver

Personal information
- Born: February 15, 1942 (age 84); Texarkana, Texas, U.S.
- Listed height: 5 ft 9 in (1.75 m)
- Listed weight: 163 lb (74 kg)

Career information
- High school: Compton (Compton, California)
- College: San Jose State (1960-1963)
- NFL draft: 1964: undrafted

Career history
- Cleveland Browns (1964–1966); New Orleans Saints (1967); Washington Redskins (1969–1970); Denver Broncos (1971)*
- * Offseason or practice squad member only

Awards and highlights
- NFL champion (1964)

Career NFL statistics
- Receptions: 67
- Receiving yards: 1,218
- Receiving touchdowns: 9
- Stats at Pro Football Reference

Walter "The Flea" Roberts (born February 15, 1942) is an American former professional football player who was a wide receiver and kick return specialist in the National Football League (NFL) for the Cleveland Browns, New Orleans Saints, and Washington Redskins. As a rookie, he served mostly as a kick returner for the Browns team that captured the 1964 NFL championship, the last time it achieved the feat.

At 5-foot-9, 163 pounds, Roberts was one of the smallest pro football players of his era. He was known as "The Flea" for his diminutive size and uncommon speed and quickness.

Roberts lettered in football, baseball and track at Compton High School outside Los Angeles. He played college football for the San Jose State Spartans.

Roberts was also an All-American jumper for the San Jose State Spartans track and field team, finishing 8th in the triple jump at the 1962 NCAA track and field championships.
