= Jimmy Heidel =

American football player (born 1943)

No. 26
- Position: Defensive back

Personal information
- Born: December 1, 1943 (age 82); Yazoo City, Mississippi, U.S.
- Listed height: 6 ft 1 in (1.85 m)
- Listed weight: 185 lb (84 kg)

Career information
- High school: Yazoo City
- College: Mississippi (1962–1965)
- NFL draft: 1965: 9th round, 124th overall pick
- AFL draft: 1965: Red Shirt 3rd round, 20th overall pick

Career history
- St. Louis Cardinals (1966); New Orleans Saints (1967)

Career NFL statistics
- Interceptions: 1
- Stats at Pro Football Reference

James Byrnes Heidel (born December 1, 1943) is an American former professional football player who was a defensive back for the St. Louis Cardinals and New Orleans Saints of the National Football League (NFL). He played college football for the Ole Miss Rebels.
