= Charlie Durkee =

American football player (born 1944)

No. 10, 15
- Position: Kicker

Personal information
- Born: June 25, 1944 (age 82); Tulsa, Oklahoma, U.S.
- Listed height: 5 ft 11 in (1.80 m)
- Listed weight: 165 lb (75 kg)

Career information
- High school: L. D. Bell (Hurst, Texas)
- College: Oklahoma State
- NFL draft: 1966: undrafted

Career history
- Dallas Cowboys (1966)*; New Orleans Saints (1967–1968, 1971–1972)
- * Offseason or practice squad member only
- Stats at Pro Football Reference

Charles Michael Durkee (born June 25, 1944, in Tulsa, Oklahoma) is an American former professional football player who was a placekicker for the New Orleans Saints of the National Football League (NFL). He played college football for the Oklahoma State Cowboys. In 1967, Durkee became the first kicker for the expansion Saints.

Durkee was with the Saints in 1967 and 1968, and again in 1971 and a portion of the 1972 season. He did not play in the NFL in 1969 or 1970.

Durkee's most productive season was in 1968, when he was responsible for 84 points as the Saints' kicker. He made 19 of 37 field goal attempts and 27 out of 27 extra points. However, the Saints would use Tom Dempsey in 1969 and 1970. Although Dempsey made a 63-yard field goal to win a game against Detroit in 1970, an NFL record at the time, he was traded by the Saints to the Philadelphia Eagles in 1971. Durkee then returned to the Saints, serving as their kicker in 1971 and part of the 1972 season.
