= Del Williams =

American football player (1945–1984)

No. 61
- Position: Offensive lineman

Personal information
- Born: November 9, 1945; Live Oak, Florida, U.S.
- Died: November 30, 1984 (aged 39); New Orleans, Louisiana, U.S.
- Listed height: 6 ft 2 in (1.88 m)
- Listed weight: 240 lb (109 kg)

Career information
- High school: Live Oak (FL) Suwannee
- College: Florida State (1963-1966)
- NFL draft: 1967: 3rd round, 79th overall pick

Career history

Playing
- New Orleans Saints (1967–1973); Florida Blazers (1974)

Coaching
- San Antonio Wings (1975) Offensive line coach

Awards and highlights
- Second-team All-American (1966); Florida State's All-Time Team

Career NFL statistics
- Games played: 92
- Games started: 87
- Fumble recoveries: 3
- Stats at Pro Football Reference

Delano Roger Williams (November 9, 1945 – November 30, 1984) was an American professional football player who was an offensive guard in the National Football League (NFL). He was selected by the New Orleans Saints in the third round of the 1967 NFL/AFL draft. He played college football for the Florida State Seminoles.

Williams is a member of Florida State's All-Time Team.

Williams died of amyotrophic lateral sclerosis (ALS or sometimes referred to as Lou Gehrig's disease).
