= Don McCall =

American football player (1944–2025)

No. 36, 32
- Position: Running back

Personal information
- Born: September 21, 1944; Birmingham, Alabama, U.S.
- Died: January 17, 2025 (aged 80); Spring Hill, Tennessee, U.S.
- Listed height: 5 ft 11 in (1.80 m)
- Listed weight: 195 lb (88 kg)

Career information
- High school: Los Angeles (CA) John C. Fremont
- College: USC (1965-1966)
- NFL draft: 1967: 5th round, 108th overall pick

Career history
- New Orleans Saints (1967–1968); Pittsburgh Steelers (1969); New Orleans Saints (1970); Southern California Sun (1974); San Antonio Wings (1975)

Career NFL statistics
- Rushing yards: 884
- Rushing average: 3.9
- Receptions: 37
- Receiving yards: 390
- Total touchdowns: 10
- Stats at Pro Football Reference

Donald Charles McCall (September 21, 1944 – January 17, 2025) was an American professional football player who was a running back for four seasons with the New Orleans Saints and the Pittsburgh Steelers of the National Football League (NFL). He played college football for the USC Trojans. After retiring from professional football, Donald began a career with the Los Angeles Police Department. McCall later transitioned to the transportation department. He died at his home in Spring Hill, Tennessee, on January 17, 2025, at the age of 80.
