= Jim Hester =

American football player (1944–2002)

No. 84, 86
- Position: Tight end

Personal information
- Born: December 13, 1944; Rock Island, Illinois, U.S.
- Died: November 14, 2002 (aged 57); Davenport, Iowa, U.S.
- Listed height: 6 ft 4 in (1.93 m)
- Listed weight: 238 lb (108 kg)

Career information
- High school: Davenport Central (IA)
- College: North Dakota
- NFL draft: 1967: 14th round, 342nd overall pick

Career history
- New Orleans Saints (1967–1969); Chicago Bears (1970)

Career NFL statistics
- Receptions: 29
- Receiving yards: 408
- Touchdowns: 3
- Stats at Pro Football Reference

Jim Hester (December 13, 1944 – November 14, 2002) was an American football tight end. He played for the New Orleans Saints from 1967 to 1969 and for the Chicago Bears in 1970.
