= George Youngblood =

American football player (born 1945)

No. 45, 49, 20, 37
- Position: Defensive back

Personal information
- Born: January 4, 1945 (age 81); Los Angeles, California, U.S.
- Listed height: 6 ft 3 in (1.91 m)
- Listed weight: 205 lb (93 kg)

Career information
- High school: Jordan (Los Angeles)
- College: Los Angeles State (1962–1965)
- NFL draft: 1966: 7th round, 97th overall pick
- AFL draft: 1966: Red Shirt 1st round, 6th overall pick

Career history
- Los Angeles Rams (1966); Cleveland Browns (1967); New Orleans Saints (1967–1968); Chicago Bears (1969)

Career NFL statistics
- Interceptions: 3
- Fumble recoveries: 3
- Touchdowns: 1
- Stats at Pro Football Reference

George Alton Youngblood (born January 4, 1945) is an American former professional football player who was a defensive back for the Los Angeles Rams, Cleveland Browns, Chicago Bears, and New Orleans Saints of the National Football League (NFL). He played college football at Los Angeles State College.
