= Tom Carr (American football) =

American football player (1942–2017)

No. 77, 86, 65, 88
- Position: Defensive tackle

Personal information
- Born: April 6, 1942; Ventura, California, U.S.
- Died: November 20, 2017 (aged 75); Philadelphia, Pennsylvania, U.S.
- Listed height: 6 ft 4 in (1.93 m)
- Listed weight: 264 lb (120 kg)

Career information
- High school: Overbrook (Philadelphia)
- College: Morgan State (1962-1965)
- NFL draft: 1966: 20th round, 305th overall pick

Career history
- Washington Redskins (1966)*; Philadelphia Bulldogs (1966); Orange County Ramblers (1967); New Orleans Saints (1968); Pottstown Firebirds (1969)
- * Offseason or practice squad member only
- Stats at Pro Football Reference

Thomas Winther Carr (April 6, 1942 – November 20, 2017) was an American football defensive tackle. He played for the New Orleans Saints in 1968.

After his football career ended, Carr returned to college at Morgan State and received a bachelor's degree in sociology. After graduation, he returned to Philadelphia and was hired by Temple University. He was with Temple for more than 20 years, serving their Office of Community Relations and as an assistant registrar.
