= Elijah Nevett =

American football player (born 1944)

No. 24
- Positions: Cornerback, Wide receiver

Personal information
- Born: April 28, 1944 (age 82); Bessemer, Alabama, U.S.
- Listed height: 6 ft 0 in (1.83 m)
- Listed weight: 185 lb (84 kg)

Career information
- High school: Brighton (AL)
- College: Clark Atlanta (1966)
- NFL draft: 1967: undrafted

Career history
- New Orleans Saints (1967–1970)

Career NFL statistics
- Interceptions: 6
- Fumble recoveries: 4
- Stats at Pro Football Reference

Elijah L. Nevett (born April 28, 1944) is an American former professional football player who was a defensive back for the New Orleans Saints of the National Football League (NFL). After playing college football for the Clark Atlanta Panthers, he played for the Saints from 1967 to 1970.
