= Jerry Jones (American football, born 1944) =

American football player (1944–2011)

No. 50, 78
- Positions: Offensive tackle, Defensive tackle, Defensive end

Personal information
- Born: February 14, 1944; Dayton, Ohio, U.S.
- Died: December 4, 2011 (aged 67); Dayton, Ohio, U.S.
- Listed height: 6 ft 4 in (1.93 m)
- Listed weight: 260 lb (118 kg)

Career information
- High school: Dunbar (Dayton)
- College: Bowling Green (1962-1965)
- NFL draft: 1966: 2nd round, 32nd overall pick
- AFL draft: 1966: 7th round, 53rd overall pick

Career history
- Atlanta Falcons (1966); New Orleans Saints (1967–1969)

Career NFL statistics
- Games played: 44
- Games started: 22
- Fumble recoveries: 1
- Stats at Pro Football Reference

Gerald Robert Jones (February 14, 1944 – December 12, 2011) was American football player. He played for the Atlanta Falcons and New Orleans Saints of the National Football League (NFL). He played college football at Bowling Green State University.

Jerry was a graduate of Dunbar High School, class of 1962. He received a Bachelor of Science from Bowling Green State University in 1966.

After his football career, Jerry served as Sergeant-at-Arms in the Ohio House of Representatives. He then taught in Dayton Public Schools until his retirement.

At age 67, Jerry died on 4 December 2011 at his residence.
