= Roy Schmidt (American football) =

American football player (1942–2022)

No. 63, 55, 66, 68
- Positions: Guard, tackle

Personal information
- Born: May 3, 1942; Colorado Springs, Colorado, U.S.
- Died: September 11, 2022 (aged 80); Athens, Georgia, U.S.
- Listed height: 6 ft 3 in (1.91 m)
- Listed weight: 248 lb (112 kg)

Career information
- High school: Oxnard (CA)
- College: Long Beach State (1963–1965)
- NFL draft: 1965: 13th round, 178th overall pick
- AFL draft: 1965: Red Shirt 11th round, 87th overall pick

Career history
- Green Bay Packers (1966)*; New Orleans Saints (1967–1968); Atlanta Falcons (1969); Washington Redskins (1970); Miami Dolphins (1971)*; Minnesota Vikings (1971)
- * Offseason or practice squad member only

Awards and highlights
- Super Bowl champion (I)

Career NFL statistics
- Games played: 43
- Games started: 15
- Stats at Pro Football Reference

Roy Lee Schmidt (May 3, 1942 – September 11, 2022) was an American professional football player who was an offensive lineman in the National Football League (NFL) for the New Orleans Saints, Atlanta Falcons, Washington Redskins, and the Minnesota Vikings. He played college football at Long Beach State University and was drafted 178th overall in the thirteenth round of the 1965 NFL draft by the Green Bay Packers.

Schmidt was the great-uncle of international basketball player, Sami Whitcomb.
