= George Rose (American football) =

American football player (1942–2023)

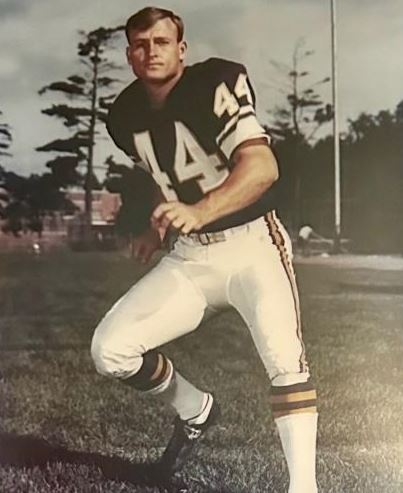

No. 44
- Position: Cornerback

Personal information
- Born: January 1, 1942; Brunswick, Georgia, U.S.
- Died: January 19, 2023 (aged 81); Brunswick, Georgia, U.S.
- Listed height: 5 ft 11 in (1.80 m)
- Listed weight: 200 lb (91 kg)

Career information
- High school: Brunswick (GA) Glynn
- College: Auburn
- NFL draft: 1964: 3rd round, 34th overall pick
- AFL draft: 1964: 3rd round, 21st overall pick

Career history
- Minnesota Vikings (1964–1966); New Orleans Saints (1967); San Francisco 49ers (1968)

Career NFL statistics
- Interceptions: 9
- Fumble recoveries: 1
- Total touchdowns: 1
- Stats at Pro Football Reference

George Lee Rose (January 1, 1942 – January 19, 2023) was an American professional football cornerback in the National Football League (NFL). He played four seasons for the Minnesota Vikings (1964–1966) and the New Orleans Saints (1967).

Rose died in Brunswick, Georgia, on January 19, 2023, at the age of 81.
