= Randy Schultz =

American football player (1943–1996)

No. 33
- Position: Running back

Personal information
- Born: November 17, 1943; Iowa Falls, Iowa, U.S.
- Died: October 4, 1996 (aged 52); Cedar Falls, Iowa, U.S.
- Listed height: 6 ft 0 in (1.83 m)
- Listed weight: 210 lb (95 kg)

Career information
- High school: Alden (Alden, Iowa)
- College: Northern Iowa (1962–1965)
- NFL draft: 1966: 5th round, 74th overall pick
- AFL draft: 1966: 20th round, 177th overall pick

Career history
- Cleveland Browns (1966); New Orleans Saints (1967–1968)

Awards and highlights
- 2× First-team Little All-American (1964, 1965); 2× NCC Most Valuable Back (1964, 1965); 3× All-NCC (1963–1965); University of Northern Iowa Athletics Hall of Fame

Career NFL statistics
- Rushing yards: 301
- Rushing average: 3.7
- Receptions: 26
- Receiving yards: 220
- Total touchdowns: 2
- Stats at Pro Football Reference

Randolph B. Schultz (November 17, 1943 – October 4, 1996) was an American professional football player in the National Football League (NFL).

Drafted 74th overall in the fifth round of the 1966 NFL draft by the Cleveland Browns, Randy Schultz played the 1966 season with the Browns, followed by two seasons with the NFL's New Orleans Saints. He was also drafted in the 20th round of the 1966 AFL draft (177th overall) by the New York Jets.

As a collegian, Schultz was twice named to the first team of the Associated Press Little All America squad (1964–65). At State College of Iowa (SCI) – now the University of Northern Iowa – he rushed for 2,808 yards and 22 touchdowns in three seasons, averaging more than 100 yards rushing per game. He led the North Central Conference (NCC) in rushing for the 1963, '64 and '65 seasons. In the 1964 football season, Schultz's rushing yards outnumbered the total combined rushing yards of all SCI opponents that season. He was named the NCC Most Valuable Back for the 1964 and '65 seasons and an NCC All-Conference selection at fullback for the 1963, '64 and '65 seasons.

In his final college game, he set school records for rushing yards in a game (120) and rushing touchdowns in a game (4) against South Dakota University and finished his college career holding all Panther rushing records.

In 1987, he was inducted into the University of Northern Iowa Athletics Hall of Fame and again in 2010 as a member of the 1964 SCI football team, which won the 1964 Pecan Bowl.

Schultz died October 4, 1996.
