= Joe Wendryhoski =

American football player (1939–2008)

No. 54
- Position: Guard

Personal information
- Born: March 1, 1939; West Frankfort, Illinois
- Died: November 6, 2008 (aged 69); Twin Lakes, Wisconsin
- Listed height: 6 ft 2 in (1.88 m)
- Listed weight: 245 lb (111 kg)

Career information
- High school: West Frankfort (IL)
- College: Illinois
- AFL draft: 1961: 13th round, 102nd overall pick

Career history
- BC Lions (1961); Los Angeles Rams (1964–1966); New Orleans Saints (1967–1968)
- Stats at Pro Football Reference

Joseph Stanley Wendryhoski (March 1, 1939 – November 6, 2008) was an American professional football player who was a guard for five seasons in the National Football League (NFL).

== Early life ==
Wendryhoski was born on March 1, 1939, in West Frankfort, Illinois, where he attended Frankfort Community High School.

He played college football at the University of Illinois from 1958 to 1961 and was voted all-Big Ten Conference in 1960.

== Professional career ==
At 6 feet (1.8 m), 2-inches tall and 245 pounds, Wendryhoski played center and offensive guard professionally. He was selected in the 1961 AFL draft by the New York Titans, but did not sign with the club; instead Wendryhoski played for the BC Lions of the Canadian Football League (CFL) that season.

A member of the Reserve Officer Training Corps (ROTC) during his collegiate years, Wendryhoski was selected for a two year stint in the US Army in the fall of 1961, becoming the first Lions player lost to the American armed services.

After signing with the Chicago Bears ahead of the 1964 NFL season, Wendryhoski was part of the 3-for-1 trade with the Los Angeles Rams which brought veteran halfback Jon Arnett to Chicago. Wendryhoski would play three seasons (1964–66) for the Rams, appearing in a total of 31 games for the team.

Left unprotected in the 1967 NFL expansion draft, he became an inaugural member of the New Orleans Saints. Wendryhoski anchored the Saints offense for two seasons (1967–68), playing every offensive snap as the starting center under head coach Tom Fears. He recovered a fumble for the Saints in 1968, the only fumble recovery of his career.

Wendryhoski, along with several of his Saints teammates, appeared in the film Number One, which starred Charlton Heston as a fading New Orleans quarterback.

== Life after football ==
After retiring from the Saints, Wendryhoski served as a vice president for the Saints Hall of Fame Museum (now located in the Louisiana Superdome) from its inception in 1988. Wendryhoski lived in Metairie, Louisiana, where he ran a real estate business, and also had a residence in Wisconsin.

== Death and legacy ==
He died at age 69 on November 6, 2008, in Twin Lakes, Wisconsin, from cancer.
