= Brian Schweda =

American football player (born 1943)

No. 60
- Position: Defensive end

Personal information
- Born: April 30, 1943 (age 83); Kansas City, Kansas, U.S.
- Listed height: 6 ft 3 in (1.91 m)
- Listed weight: 250 lb (113 kg)

Career information
- High school: Lawrence (Lawrence, Kansas)
- College: Kansas (1961–1964)
- NFL draft: 1965: 8th round, 101st overall pick
- AFL draft: 1965: 16th round, 121st overall pick

Career history
- Chicago Bears (1966); New Orleans Saints (1967–1968)

Awards and highlights
- First-team All-Big Eight (1964); Second-team All-Big Eight (1963)

Career NFL statistics
- Fumble recoveries: 5
- Sacks: 3.5
- Stats at Pro Football Reference

Brian Christopher Schweda (born April 30, 1943) is an American former professional football player who was a defensive end for the Chicago Bears and New Orleans Saints of the National Football League (NFL). He played college football for the Kansas Jayhawks.
