= Tom McNeill =

American football player (born 1942)

No. 12, 36
- Position: Punter

Personal information
- Born: August 12, 1942 (age 84); Rockford, Illinois, U.S.
- Listed height: 6 ft 1 in (1.85 m)
- Listed weight: 195 lb (88 kg)

Career information
- High school: Houston (TX) Spring Branch
- College: Stephen F. Austin State
- NFL draft: 1967: undrafted

Career history
- New Orleans Saints (1967–1969); Minnesota Vikings (1970); Philadelphia Eagles (1971–1973); Atlanta Falcons (1975)*
- * Offseason or practice squad member only
- Stats at Pro Football Reference

Thomas Gregg McNeill is an American former professional football player who was a punter for seven seasons in the National Football League (NFL) for the New Orleans Saints, Minnesota Vikings, and Philadelphia Eagles. He attended Spring Branch High School and Wharton County Junior College before playing college football for the Stephen F. Austin Lumberjacks.
