= Bill Cody (American football) =

American football player (born 1944)

- Cody in 1972

No. 52, 66
- Position: Linebacker

Personal information
- Born: August 2, 1944 (age 82); Greenwood, Mississippi, U.S.
- Listed height: 6 ft 2 in (1.88 m)
- Listed weight: 230 lb (104 kg)

Career information
- High school: Boone (Orlando, Florida)
- College: Auburn (1962–1965)
- NFL draft: 1966: 5th round, 67th overall pick
- AFL draft: 1966: 15th round, 132nd overall pick

Career history
- Detroit Lions (1966); New Orleans Saints (1967–1970); Philadelphia Eagles (1972)

Awards and highlights
- Second-team All-American (1965); 2× First-team All-SEC (1964, 1965)

Career NFL statistics
- Fumble recoveries: 4
- Sacks: 1.5
- Stats at Pro Football Reference

William Eugene Cody (born August 2, 1944) is an American former professional football player who was a linebacker in the National Football League (NFL). He played college football for the Auburn Tigers. He played six seasons in the NFL for the Detroit Lions (1966), New Orleans Saints (1967–1970), and Philadelphia Eagles (1972).

Cody was inducted into the Alabama Sports Hall of Fame in May 2014.
