= Earl Leggett =

American football player and coach (1933–2008)

No. 71, 72
- Positions: Defensive tackle, defensive end

Personal information
- Born: March 5, 1933; Palatka, Florida, U.S.
- Died: May 15, 2008 (aged 75); Raymond, Mississippi, U.S.
- Listed height: 6 ft 3 in (1.91 m)
- Listed weight: 265 lb (120 kg)

Career information
- High school: Robert E. Lee (Jacksonville, Florida); Raymond
- College: Hinds CC (1953-1954); LSU (1955-1956)
- NFL draft: 1957: 1st round, 13th overall pick

Career history

Playing
- Chicago Bears (1957–1965); Los Angeles Rams (1966); New Orleans Saints (1967–1968)

Coaching
- Southern California Sun (1974-1975) Defensive line coach; Seattle Seahawks (1976–1977) Defensive line coach; San Francisco 49ers (1978) Defensive line coach; Oakland / Los Angeles Raiders (1980–1988) Defensive line coach; Denver Broncos (1989–1990) Defensive line coach; Los Angeles Raiders (1991–1992) Defensive line coach; New York Giants (1993–1996) Defensive line coach; Washington Redskins (1997–1999) Defensive line coach

Awards and highlights
- NFL champion (1963); 2× Super Bowl champion (XV, XVIII)

Career NFL statistics
- Fumble recoveries: 16
- Interceptions: 1
- Sacks: 18
- Stats at Pro Football Reference

Earl Franklin Leggett (March 5, 1933 – May 15, 2008) was an American professional football defensive lineman in the National Football League (NFL) for the Chicago Bears, Los Angeles Rams, and New Orleans Saints. He played college football at Louisiana State University (LSU). He was an assistant coach for various teams.

Leggett's career in professional football began as a first-round draft pick of the Bears in 1957 and spanned 11 years from 1957 to 1968. He is recorded as having played in 132 games in the NFL.

His career lasted from 1957 to 1965 with Chicago, where he played at both defensive tackle and defensive end positions. He was part of the "Monsters of the Midway" defense that led the Bears to the 1963 NFL championship. He was traded to the Los Angeles Rams in 1966, where he played in 10 regular season games with the Rams' "Fearsome Foursome" defense.

Toward the end of his career, journeyman Leggett played 20 games in 1967 and 1968 for the expansion New Orleans Saints franchise.

Leggett first played college football at Hinds Jr. College (today known as Hinds Community College). He started playing for them at 16 (which was then legal) and was able to raise his academic standing to get into LSU. Leggett became an All-Southeastern Conference player at LSU.

== Coaching career ==
Leggett helped shape the careers of Howie Long with the Raiders and Michael Strahan with the New York Giants. He introduced Long into the Pro Football Hall of Fame in 2000.
