= Big 12 Conference All-Time football team =

The Big 12 Conference members of the Associated Press held a vote in 2010 and voted on the best players during the Big 12 Conference's 15-year existence.

- Note: Players in **bold** were selected. Players not in bold only received votes.

== Offense ==
Position	Player	College	Vote(s)	College Hall of Famer
Quarterback	**Vince Young**	**Texas**	**16**	**No**
Quarterback	Colt McCoy	Texas	3	No
Quarterback	Sam Bradford	Oklahoma	1	No
Running back
Running back	**Ricky Williams**	**Texas**	**20**	**No**
Running back	**Adrian Peterson**	**Oklahoma**	**16**	**No**
Running back	Darren Sproles	Kansas State	3	No
Running back	Ahman Green	Nebraska	1	No
Wide receiver
Wide receiver	**Michael Crabtree**	**Texas Tech**	**19**	**No**
Wide receiver	**Rashaun Woods**	**Oklahoma State**	**8**	**No**
Wide receiver	Jeremy Maclin	Missouri	5	No
Wide receiver	Mark Clayton	Oklahoma	3	No
Wide receiver	Jordan Shipley	Texas	2	No
Wide receiver	Ryan Broyles	Oklahoma	1	No
Wide receiver	Dez Bryant	Oklahoma State	1	No
Wide receiver	Roy Williams	Texas	1	No
Tight end
Tight end	**Chase Coffman**	**Missouri**	**8**	**No**
Tight end	Daniel Graham	Colorado	7	No
Tight end	Jermaine Gresham	Oklahoma	3	No
Tight end	Alonzo Mayes	Oklahoma State	1	No
Tight end	David Thomas	Texas	1	No
Center
Center	**Dominic Raiola**	**Nebraska**	**13**	**No**
Center	Seth McKinney	Texas A&M	3	No
Center	Jon Cooper	Oklahoma	1	No
Center	Randall Cummins	Kansas State	1	No
Center	Rob Riti	Missouri	1	No
Center	Adam Spieker	Missouri	1	No
Guard/Tackle
Guard/Tackle	**Jammal Brown**	**Oklahoma**	**15**	**No**
Guard/Tackle	**Aaron Taylor**	**Nebraska**	**15**	**No**
Guard/Tackle	**Justin Blalock**	**Texas**	**13**	**No**
Guard/Tackle	**Russell Okung**	**Oklahoma State**	**12**	**No**
Guard/Tackle	Andre Gurode	Colorado	8	No
Guard/Tackle	Leonard Davis	Texas	3	No
Guard/Tackle	Duke Robinson	Oklahoma	3	No
Guard/Tackle	Chris Naeole	Colorado	2	No
Guard/Tackle	Jason Smith	Baylor	2	No
Guard/Tackle	Trent Williams	Oklahoma	2	No
Guard/Tackle	Anthony Collins	Kansas	1	No
Guard/Tackle	Chris Dishman	Nebraska	1	No
Guard/Tackle	Toniu Fonoti	Nebraska	1	No
Guard/Tackle	Richie Incognito	Nebraska	1	No
Guard/Tackle	Phil Loadholt	Oklahoma	1	No

== Defense ==
Position	Player	College	Vote(s)	College Hall of Famer
Defensive line	**Ndamukong Suh**	**Nebraska**	**20**	**No**
Defensive line	**Tommie Harris**	**Oklahoma**	**17**	**No**
Defensive line	**Grant Wistrom**	**Nebraska**	**17**	**Yes**
Defensive line	**Brian Orakpo**	**Texas**	**10**	**No**
Defensive line	Gerald McCoy	Oklahoma	4	No
Defensive line	Darren Howard	Kansas State	2	No
Defensive line	Montae Reagor	Texas Tech	2	No
Defensive line	Justin Smith	Missouri	2	No
Defensive line	Jeremy Beal	Oklahoma	1	No
Defensive line	Dan Cody	Oklahoma	1	No
Defensive line	Dusty Dvoracek	Oklahoma	1	No
Defensive line	Casey Hampton	Texas	1	No
Defensive line	James McClinton	Kansas	1	No
Defensive line	Brian Smith	Missouri	1	No
Linebacker	**Derrick Johnson**	**Texas**	**19**	**No**
Linebacker	**Dat Nguyen**	**Texas A&M**	**19**	**No**
Linebacker	**Rocky Calmus**	**Oklahoma**	**12**	**No**
Linebacker	**Teddy Lehman**	**Oklahoma**	**10**	**No**
Linebacker	Mark Simoneau	Kansas State	6	No
Linebacker	Rufus Alexander	Oklahoma	2	No
Linebacker	Sean Weatherspoon	Missouri	2	No
Linebacker	Jordan Dizon	Colorado	1	No
Linebacker	Lawrence Flugence	Texas Tech	1	No
Linebacker	Jeff Kelly	Kansas State	1	No
Linebacker	Curtis Lofton	Oklahoma	1	No
Linebacker	Carlos Polk	Nebraska	1	No
Linebacker	Nick Reid	Kansas	1	No
Linebacker	Matt Russell	Colorado	1	No
Defensive back	**Roy Williams**	**Oklahoma**	**19**	**No**
Defensive back	**Terence Newman**	**Kansas State**	**16**	**No**
Defensive back	**Derrick Strait**	**Oklahoma**	**10**	**No**
Defensive back	**Michael Huff**	**Texas**	**8**	**No**
Defensive back	Aqib Talib	Kansas	7	No
Defensive back	Mike Brown	Nebraska	4	No
Defensive back	Ralph Brown	Nebraska	3	No
Defensive back	Aaron Ross	Texas	2	No
Defensive back	Earl Thomas	Texas	2	No
Defensive back	Nathan Vasher	Texas	2	No
Defensive back	Chris Canty	Kansas State	1	No
Defensive back	Ellis Hobbs	Iowa State	1	No
Defensive back	Quentin Jammer	Texas	1	No
Defensive back	R. W. McQuarters	Oklahoma State	1	No
Defensive back	Mike Minter	Nebraska	1	No
Defensive back	Dwayne Slay	Texas Tech	1	No
Defensive back	Jason Webster	Texas A&M	1	No

== Special teams ==
Position	Player	College	Vote(s)	College Hall of Famer
All-purpose	**Darren Sproles**	**Kansas State**	**6**	**No**
All-purpose	David Allen	Kansas State	5	No
All-purpose	Wes Welker	Texas Tech	4	No
All-purpose	Dez Bryant	Oklahoma State	2	No
All-purpose	Brad Smith	Missouri	2	No
All-purpose	Jeremy Maclin	Missouri	1	No
Punter	**Daniel Sepulveda**	**Baylor**	**15**	**No**
Punter	Shane Lechler	Texas A&M	5	No
Kicker	**Mason Crosby**	**Colorado**	**12**	**No**
Kicker	Martin Gramatica	Kansas State	5	No
Kicker	Jeff Wolfert	Missouri	2	No
Kicker	Alex Henery	Nebraska	1	No

== Other ==
Position	Player	College	Vote(s)	College Hall of Famer
Coach	**Bob Stoops**	**Oklahoma**	**18**	**No**
Coach	Mack Brown	Texas	1	No
Coach	Bill Snyder	Kansas State	1	No
Top Offensive Player	**Vince Young**	**Texas**	**10**	**No**
Top Offensive Player	Ricky Williams	Texas	7	No
Top Offensive Player	Colt McCoy	Texas	2	No
Top Offensive Player	Sam Bradford	Oklahoma	1	No
Top Defensive Player	**Ndamukong Suh**	**Nebraska**	**16**	**No**
Top Defensive Player	Roy Williams	Oklahoma	2	No
Top Defensive Player	Derrick Johnson	Texas	1	No
Top Defensive Player	Grant Wistrom	Nebraska	1	Yes

== School summary ==
School	Players	Players RV	Total Players	Total Vote(s)
Baylor	1	1	2	17
Colorado	1	5	6	31
Iowa State	0	1	1	1
Kansas	0	4	4	10
Kansas State	2	9	11	47
Missouri	1	9	10	25
Nebraska	5	10	15	96
Oklahoma	8	16	24	145
Oklahoma State	2	4	6	25
Texas	7	14	21	125
Texas A&M	1	3	4	28
Texas Tech	1	4	5	27

== Voters ==
The voters were Lee Barfknecht, Omaha (Neb.) World-Herald; Kelly Beaton, Waterloo-Cedar Falls (Iowa) Courier; Kirk Bohls, Austin (Texas) American-Statesman; Jimmy Burch, Fort Worth (Texas) Star-Telegram; Chuck Carlton, The Dallas Morning News; Robert Cessna, Bryan Eagle; Mike Finger, San Antonio Express-News; Vahe Gregorian, St. Louis Post-Dispatch; Bill Haisten, Tulsa (Okla.) World; Kevin Haskin, Topeka Capital-Journal; Brian Howell, Longmont (Colo.) Daily Times-Call; Tom Keegan, Lawrence Journal-World; Blair Kerkhoff, Kansas City Star; Bobby La Gesse, Ames (Iowa) Tribune; Dave Matter, Columbia (Mo.) Daily Tribune; Kyle Ringo, Boulder (Colo.) Daily Camera; John Shinn, Norman (Okla.) Transcript; Jake Trotter, The Oklahoman; John Werner, Waco (Texas) Tribune-Herald; Don Williams, Lubbock (Texas) Avalanche-Journal.
