= 1995 All-America college football team =

Official list of the best college football players of 1995

The 1995 All-America college football team is composed of the following All-American Teams: Associated Press, United Press International, Football Writers Association of America, American Football Coaches Association, Walter Camp Foundation, The Sporting News and Football News.

The College Football All-America Team is an honor given annually to the best American college football players at their respective positions. The original usage of the term All-America seems to have been to such a list selected by football pioneer Walter Camp in the 1890s. The NCAA has officially recognized All-Americans selected by over a changing roster of over 20 organizations. In 1995, the official selectors were the AP, UPI, AFCA, FWAA, WCFF, TSN, and FN to determine Consensus All-Americans.

The Newspaper Enterprise Association (NEA), the oldest All-American college football selection at the time and once an official selector, also selected a team.

== Offense ==
=== Quarterback ===
- Tommie Frazier, Nebraska (College Football Hall of Fame) (AP-1, UPI, Walter Camp, AFCA-Coaches, FWAA-Writers, TSN, NEA-1)
- Danny Wuerffel, Florida (College Football Hall of Fame) (AP-2, FN-1, NEA-2)
- Danny Kanell, Florida State (FN-2)
- Peyton Manning, Tennessee (AP-3)

=== Running backs ===
- Eddie George, Ohio State (College Football Hall of Fame) (AP-1, UPI, Walter Camp, AFCA-Coaches, FWAA-Writers, TSN, FN-1, NEA-1)
- Troy Davis, Iowa State (College Football Hall of Fame) (AP-1, UPI, Walter Camp, AFCA-Coaches, TSN, FN-1, NEA-2)
- Darnell Autry, Northwestern (AP-2, FN-2, NEA-2)
- George Jones, San Diego St. (AP-2)
- Karim Abdul-Jabbar, UCLA (FN-2)
- Mike Alstott, Purdue (AP-3)
- Tim Biakabutuka, Michigan (AP-3)
- Warrick Dunn, Florida State (NEA-2)

=== Wide receivers ===
- Keyshawn Johnson, USC (AP-1, UPI, Walter Camp, AFCA-Coaches, FWAA-Writers, TSN, FN-1, NEA-1)
- Terry Glenn, Ohio State (AP-1, UPI, Walter Camp, FWAA-Writers, TSN, FN-1, NEA-1)
- Marcus Harris, Wyoming (AFCA-Coaches)
- Alex Van Dyke, Nevada (AP-2)
- Chris Doering, Florida (AP-2)
- Bobby Engram, Penn State (AP-3, FN-2, NEA-2)
- Derrick Mayes, Notre Dame (AP-3, FN-2, NEA-2)

=== Tight end ===
- Marco Battaglia, Rutgers (AP-1, UPI, Walter Camp, AFCA-Coaches, FWAA-Writers, TSN, FN-1, NEA-1)
- Brian Roche, San Jose State (AP-2, FN-2)
- Pat Fitzgerald, Texas (AP-3)
- Stephen Alexander, Oklahoma (NEA-2)

=== Guards/tackles ===
- Orlando Pace, Ohio State (College Football Hall of Fame) (AP-1, UPI, Walter Camp, AFCA-Coaches, FWAA-Writers, TSN, FN-1, NEA-1)
- Jonathan Ogden, UCLA (College Football Hall of Fame) (AP-1, UPI, Walter Camp, AFCA-Coaches, FWAA-Writers, TSN, FN-1, NEA-1)
- Jason Odom, Florida (AP-1, UPI, Walter Camp, AFCA-Coaches, FWAA-Writers, TSN, FN-1, NEA-1)
- Jeff Hartings, Penn State (UPI, Walter Camp, AFCA-Coaches, TSN, AP-2, FN-2, NEA-1)
- Dan Neil, Texas (FWAA-Writers, AP-2, FN-2, NEA-2)
- Heath Irwin, Colorado (AP-1)
- Willie Anderson, Auburn (AP-2)
- Jason Layman, Tennessee (AP-2, NEA-2)
- Roman Oben, Louisville (AP-3, FN-2)
- Chris Banks, Kansas (AP-3)
- Jon Runyan, Michigan (AP-3)
- Ryan Leahy, Notre Dame (AP-3)
- Roman Oben, Louisville (NEA-2)

=== Center ===
- Bryan Stoltenberg, Colorado (AP-3, UPI, Walter Camp, FN-1, NEA-2)
- Clay Shiver, Florida State (AFCA-Coaches, FWAA-Writers, TSN, AP-2, FN-2, NEA-1)
- Aaron Graham, Nebraska (AP-1, FN-1, NEA-2 [as OL])

== Defense ==
=== Ends ===
- Tony Brackens, Texas (AP-2, AFCA-Coaches, FWAA-Writers, TSN, NEA-2)
- Tim Colston, Kansas State (AP-2, Walter Camp, AFCA-Coaches, NEA-1)
- Cedric Jones, Oklahoma (AP-3, FWAA-Writers, TSN, FN-2)
- Jared Tomich, Nebraska (AP-1)
- Mike Vrabel, Ohio State (AP-3, FN-1, NEA-2)

=== Tackles ===
- Tedy Bruschi, Arizona (College Football Hall of Fame) (AP-1, UPI, Walter Camp, AFCA-Coaches, FWAA-Writers, TSN, NEA-1)
- Cornell Brown, Virginia Tech (AP-1, UPI, FWAA-Writers, TSN, FN-1, NEA-2)
- Marcus Jones, North Carolina (AP-1, UPI, Walter Camp, AFCA-Coaches, NEA-1)
- Brandon Mitchell, Texas A&M (AP-2 [as DL], Walter Camp, NEA-2)
- Jason Horn, Michigan (AP-2 [as DL] AFCA-Coaches, FN-2, NEA-2)
- Tarek Saleh, Wisconsin (FN-2)
- J. C. Price, Virginia Tech (AP-3)
- Grant Wistrom, Nebraska (AP-3)

=== Linebackers ===
- Zach Thomas, Texas Tech (College Football Hall of Fame) (AP-1, UPI, Walter Camp, AFCA-Coaches, FWAA-Writers, TSN, FN-1, NEA-1)
- Pat Fitzgerald, Northwestern (College Football Hall of Fame) (AP-1, UPI, AFCA-Coaches, FWAA-Writers, TSN, FN-2, NEA-1)
- Kevin Hardy, Illinois (AP-1, UPI, Walter Camp, FWAA-Writers, TSN, FN-1, NEA-1)
- Ray Lewis, Miami (Fla.) (AP-1, UPI, FN-2, NEA-2)
- Simeon Rice, Illinois (AP-2, Walter Camp, FN-1, NEA-2)
- Duane Clemons, California (AP-2, NEA-2)
- Terrell Farley, Nebraska (AP-2)
- Percell Gaskins, Kansas State (AP-3, FN-2)
- Jared Tomich, Nebraska (FN-2)
- Matt Russell, Colorado (AP-3)
- Anthony Simmons, Clemson (AP-3)

=== Backs ===
- Aaron Beasley, West Virginia (AP-2, UPI, Walter Camp, AFCA-Coaches, FN-1, NEA-1)
- Lawyer Milloy, Washington (AP-1, UPI, Walter Camp, AFCA-Coaches, FWAA-Writers, TSN, FN-1, NEA-1)
- Chris Canty, Kansas State (AP-1, UPI, FWAA-Writers, TSN, FN-1)
- Greg Myers, Colorado State (AP-1, UPI, Walter Camp, TSN, NEA-2)
- Alex Molden, Oregon (AP-2, AFCA-Coaches, NEA-1)
- Adrian Robinson, Baylor (AFCA-Coaches, NEA-1)
- Ray Mickens, Texas A&M (AP-3, Walter Camp, NEA-2)
- Kevin Abrams, Syracuse (AP-3, FWAA-Writers, TSN)
- Marcus Coleman, Texas Tech (FWAA-Writers)
- Percy Ellsworth, Virginia (AP-2, FN-1, NEA-2)
- Brian Dawkins, Clemson (AP-2)
- Shawn Springs, Ohio State (FN-2)
- Hudhaifa Ismaeli, Northwestern (FN-2)
- Jerome Woods, Memphis (AP-3, FN-2)
- Kenny Wheaton, Oregon (FN-2)
- Willie Smith, Louisiana Tech (AP-3)
- Brandon Sanders, Arizona (NEA-2)

== Specialists ==
=== Placekicker ===
- Michael Reeder, TCU (AP-1, AFCA-Coaches, FWAA-Writers, TSN, FN-1, NEA-1)
- Sam Valenzisi, Northwestern (AP-2, FN-2)
- Eric Abrams, Stanford (AP-3)
- Chris Ferencik, Pittsburgh (NEA-2)

=== Punter ===
- Brad Maynard, Ball State (AP-1, Walter Camp, AFCA-Coaches, TSN, FN-1, NEA-1)
- Will Brice, Virginia (FWAA-Writers)
- Brian Gragert, Wyoming (AP-2, FN-2, NEA-2)
- Greg Ivy, Oklahoma State (AP-3)

=== All-purpose / kick returners ===
- Marvin Harrison, Syracuse (FWAA-Writers-Ret, TSN-Ret)
- Leeland McElroy, Texas A&M (AP-All-purpose-1)
- Ricky Whittle, Oregon (AP-All-purpose-2)
- Wasean Tait, Toledo (AP-3)

== See also ==
- 1995 All-Atlantic Coast Conference football team
- 1995 All-Big Eight Conference football team
- 1995 All-Big Ten Conference football team
- 1995 All-Pacific-10 Conference football team
- 1995 All-SEC football team
