= Mike Flanagan (American football) =

American football player (born 1973)

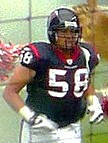
- Flanagan in 2007

No. 58
- Position: Center

Personal information
- Born: November 10, 1973 (age 52); Washington, D.C., U.S.
- Listed height: 6 ft 5 in (1.96 m)
- Listed weight: 303 lb (137 kg)

Career information
- High school: Rio Americano
- College: UCLA
- NFL draft: 1996: 3rd round, 90th overall pick

Career history
- Green Bay Packers (1996–2005); Houston Texans (2006–2007)

Awards and highlights
- Super Bowl champion (XXXI); Pro Bowl (2003); Third-team All-American (1995); 2× First-team All-Pac-10 (1994, 1995)

Career NFL statistics
- Games played: 121
- Games started: 86
- Fumble recoveries: 2
- Stats at Pro Football Reference

Michael Christopher Flanagan (born November 10, 1973) is an American former professional football player who was a center for 12 seasons in the National Football League (NFL). He played college football for the UCLA Bruins and was selected by the Green Bay Packers in the third round of the 1996 NFL draft with the 90th overall pick. Flanagan played from 1998 to 2005 with the Packers and then with the Houston Texans from 2006 to 2007.

== Early life and college ==
Flanagan was born in Washington, D.C., and graduated from Rio Americano High School in Sacramento, California, in 1991. He is of Irish descent. At UCLA, Flanagan redshirted in 1991, played one game in 1992, and started 32 consecutive games from 1993 to 1995. He was a first-team All-Pac-10 selection in his junior and senior seasons and third-team All-America recognition as a senior. Flanagan became a starter in 1993 after Jonathan Ogden, a future NFL player, was injured. In 2002, he graduated from UCLA with a Bachelor of Arts degree in history. For three years, Flanagan earned a spot on the UCLA athletic director's academic honor roll.

== Professional career ==
=== Green Bay Packers ===
In the 1996 NFL draft, the Green Bay Packers selected Flanagan in the third round as the 90th overall pick. Flanagan sat out the 1996 and 1997 seasons due to an injury sustained during the 1996 preseason.

Although the Green Bay Packers traded Flanagan to the Carolina Panthers in August 1998, the trade was nullified because Flanagan did not pass a physical. With the Packers, Flanagan made his professional regular season debut on December 13, 1998, a victory over the Chicago Bears. Flanagan became the starting center in 2001. Flanagan was named to the Pro Bowl for the first time in 2003, the first Packers center to be named since 1996. Flanagan sat out the season after October 2004 due to knee surgery.

=== Houston Texans ===
On March 24, 2006, Flanagan signed with the Houston Texans. He was released by the Texans on February 20, 2008.
