= John Michels =

American football player (born 1973)

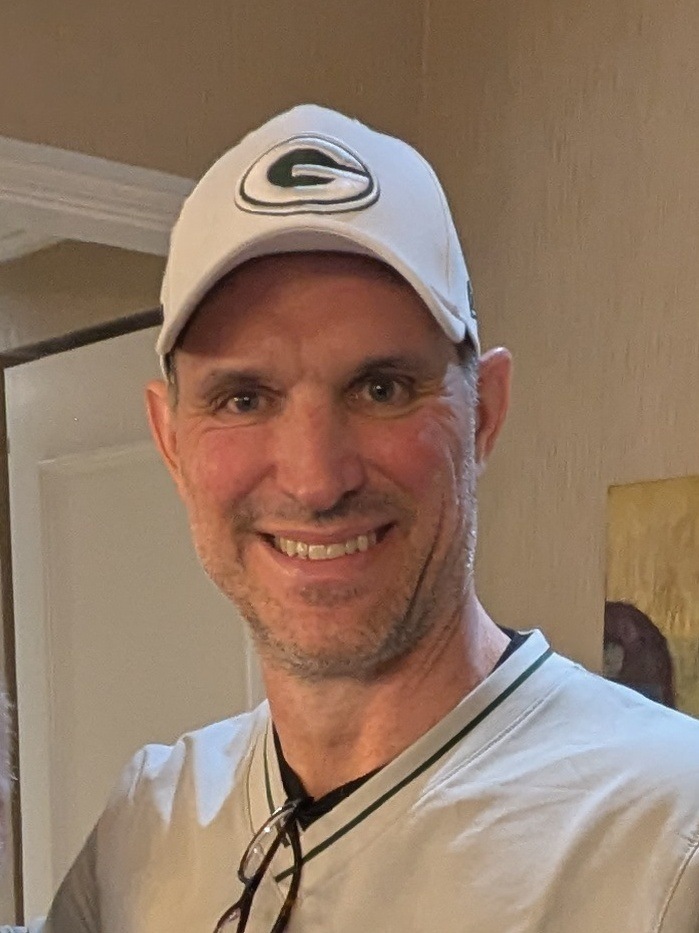
- Michels in 2025

No. 77
- Position: Offensive tackle

Personal information
- Born: March 19, 1973 (age 53); La Jolla, California, U.S.
- Listed height: 6 ft 7 in (2.01 m)
- Listed weight: 300 lb (136 kg)

Career information
- High school: La Jolla
- College: Southern California
- NFL draft: 1996: 1st round, 27th overall pick

Career history
- Green Bay Packers (1996–1998); Philadelphia Eagles (1999)

Awards and highlights
- Super Bowl champion (XXXI); PFWA All-Rookie Team (1996); Green Bay Packers Rookie of the Year (1996); First-team All-Pac-10 (1995)

Career NFL statistics
- Games played: 24
- Games started: 14
- Stats at Pro Football Reference

John Spiegel Michels (born March 19, 1973) is an American former professional football player who was an offensive tackle in the National Football League (NFL).

== Early life ==
Michels attended La Jolla High School, where he was a three time letterman in football, basketball, and track. In football, he was a two-way starter and was named First-team All-American and Western League Defensive MVP as a defensive tackle, and First-team All-San Diego County as an offensive tackle. In track and field, he was the 1991 Western League Champion in the discus.

Michels was named as one of San Diego's 100 all-time greatest prep football players by the San Diego Union-Tribune.

== College career ==
Michels played college football at the University of Southern California and was a First-team All-Pac-10 and a Second-team All-American offensive tackle, after being converted from a defensive end. He helped to lead the Trojans to a victory over Northwestern University in the 1996 Rose Bowl. After his senior year at USC, Michels was selected as a starter in the 1996 Senior Bowl All-Star game.

== Professional career ==
Pre-draft measurables
Height	Weight	Arm length	Hand span	40-yard dash	10-yard split	20-yard split	20-yard shuttle	Vertical jump	Broad jump	Bench press
6 ft 6 1/2 in (1.99 m)	282 lb (128 kg)	33 7/8 in (0.86 m)	10 5/8 in (0.27 m)	5.12 s	1.78 s	2.97 s	4.66 s	26.5 in (0.67 m)	9 ft 0 in (2.74 m)	25 reps
All values from NFL Combine

Michels was selected in the first round, 27th pick overall, of the 1996 NFL draft by the Green Bay Packers. When then-starter and fellow Trojan Ken Ruettgers went down with a knee injury, Michels took over the left tackle duties. He started 9 games in his rookie season, helping the Packers win Super Bowl XXXI. He was the Green Bay Packers 1996 Rookie of the Year and named to the 1996 PFWA NFL All-Rookie Team.

In 1997, he returned as the starting left tackle, starting the first five games of the season before injuring his right knee against the Detroit Lions. He was sidelined for the rest of the season and replaced by that year's first round pick Ross Verba.

After having his best training camp as a professional in 1998, he again injured his right knee and spent the year on injured reserve. Unable to recover from his knee injury, he struggled in training camp in 1999 and was traded to the Philadelphia Eagles for defensive end Jon Harris. Michels only lasted a couple of weeks in Philadelphia before his knee injury ultimately ended his career.

== Personal life ==
Born John Spiegel Michels Jr., Michels is the great-great-grandson of Joseph Spiegel, the founder of Spiegel Catalog, which was one of the most important firms in the mail-order industry, and the first to offer credit through the mail.

From 2000 to 2002 he served as the Youth Director at Canyon Hills Church in Mission Viejo, California.

In 2008 Michels received his medical degree from the Keck School of Medicine at the University of Southern California. He completed a residency in diagnostic radiology at Baylor College of Medicine in Houston, Texas, and a fellowship in interventional pain medicine at the University of California, Irvine. He is a diplomate of the American Board of Radiology and the American Board of Pain Medicine.
