= Chris Canty =

Chris Canty may refer to:

- Chris Canty (defensive back) (born 1976), former cornerback for the New England Patriots, Seattle Seahawks, and New Orleans Saints
- Chris Canty (defensive lineman) (born 1982), former defensive end for the Dallas Cowboys, New York Giants, and Baltimore Ravens
