= ABPM =

ABPM may refer to:

- Ambulatory blood pressure monitoring, a medical sign
- American Board of Preventive Medicine, a medical organization
- American Board of Pain Medicine
