= Chris Banks (American football) =

American football player (1973–2014)

- Banks with the Denver Broncos in 1999

No. 70, 79, 76
- Position: Guard

Personal information
- Born: April 4, 1973; Lexington, Missouri, U.S.
- Died: April 9, 2014 (aged 41); Abingdon, Maryland, U.S.
- Listed height: 6 ft 1 in (1.85 m)
- Listed weight: 300 lb (136 kg)

Career information
- College: Kansas
- NFL draft: 1996: 7th round, 226th overall pick

Career history
- Denver Broncos (1996–1999); → Barcelona Dragons (1997); Atlanta Falcons (2000–2001)

Awards and highlights
- 2× Super Bowl champion (XXXII, XXXIII); Third-team All-American (1995); First-team All-Big Eight (1995)

Career NFL statistics
- Games played: 28
- Games started: 5
- Stats at Pro Football Reference

Warren Christopher Banks (April 4, 1973 – April 9, 2014) was an American professional football guard in the National Football League (NFL). Drafted out of the University of Kansas by the Broncos with the 226th overall pick in the seventh round of the 1996 NFL draft, Banks won a Super Bowl ring as a member of the Broncos' Super Bowl XXXIII championship team in 1998. Banks also played for the Barcelona Dragons and Atlanta Falcons. Banks died at his home in Abingdon, Maryland, on April 9, 2014.
