= Ricky Whittle (American football) =

American football player (born 1971)

No. 23, 14
- Position: Running back

Personal information
- Born: December 21, 1971 (age 54); Fresno, California, U.S.
- Listed height: 5 ft 9 in (1.75 m)
- Listed weight: 200 lb (91 kg)

Career information
- High school: Edison (Fresno, California)
- College: Oregon
- NFL draft: 1996: 4th round, 103rd overall pick

Career history
- New Orleans Saints (1996); Tennessee Oilers (1998)*; Saskatchewan Roughriders (1999)
- * Offseason or practice squad member only

Awards and highlights
- Second-team All-American (1995); 2× First-team All-Pac-10 (1994, 1995)

Career NFL statistics
- Rushing yards: 52
- Rushing average: 2.6
- Receptions: 26
- Receiving yards: 162
- Stats at Pro Football Reference

Ricky Jerome Whittle (born December 21, 1971) is an American former professional football player who was a running back for one season with the New Orleans Saints of the National Football League (NFL). He played college football for the Oregon Ducks, earning second-team All-American, as an all-purpose player in 1995. He was selected in the fourth round of the 1996 NFL draft with the 103rd overall pick.

Pre-draft measurables
Height	Weight	Arm length	Hand span
5 ft 9 in (1.75 m)	200 lb (91 kg)	30 1/8 in (0.77 m)	9 1/4 in (0.23 m)
