= Dorian Brew =

American football player (born 1974)

No. 22, 42, 24, 45
- Position: Cornerback

Personal information
- Born: July 19, 1974 (age 52); St. Louis, Missouri, U.S.
- Listed height: 5 ft 10 in (1.78 m)
- Listed weight: 182 lb (83 kg)

Career information
- High school: Florissant, MO
- College: Kansas
- NFL draft: 1996: 3rd round, 79th overall pick

Career history
- Miami Dolphins (1996)*; Kansas City Chiefs (1996)*; Baltimore Ravens (1996–1997); San Diego Chargers (1997); Frankfurt Galaxy (1999); Chicago Bears (1999); Chicago Enforcers (2001); Montreal Alouettes (2002)
- * Offseason or practice squad member only

Awards and highlights
- First-team All-Big Eight (1995)

Career NFL statistics
- Tackles: 10
- Return yards: 88
- Stats at Pro Football Reference

Dorian Culbert Brew (born July 19, 1974) is an American former professional football player who was a cornerback from 1996 to 2002.

Originally drafted by the Miami Dolphins in the third round of the 1996 NFL draft, Brew signed with the Baltimore Ravens. After playing in eight games with the Ravens during his rookie year, Brew served as the team's kick returner for three game in 1997, returning five kicks for 88 yards. Brew signed with the Chargers for the remainder of the 1997 season playing in 8 games. After sitting out the 1998 season due to injuries, Brew made a comeback in 1999 playing for the NFL Europe team Frankfurt Galaxy. After finishing that season as one of the top defensive backs in the league, Brew signed a contract with the Chicago Bears in 1999 and spent the season on IR after injuring a knee. Brew played for the XFL's Chicago Enforces 2000-2001 finishing the season as a top DB ranking second in the league in interceptions. After a brief stint in the CFL with the Montreal Alouettes in 2002, he retired from football soon after.
