= Percell Gaskins =

American football player and coach (born 1972)

No. 54, 55
- Position: Linebacker

Personal information
- Born: April 25, 1972 (age 54); Daytona Beach, Florida, U.S.
- Listed height: 6 ft 0 in (1.83 m)
- Listed weight: 230 lb (104 kg)

Career information
- High school: Seabreeze (Daytona Beach)
- College: Northwestern Oklahoma State (1991); Kansas State (1992–1995)
- NFL draft: 1996: 4th round, 105th overall pick

Career history

Playing
- St. Louis Rams (1996); Carolina Panthers (1997)

Coaching
- Garinger High School Head coach (2014–2015)

Awards and highlights
- Second-team All-American (1995); First-team All-Big Eight (1995); Second-team All-Big Eight (1994)

Career NFL statistics
- Total tackles: 28
- Fumble recoveries: 1
- Stats at Pro Football Reference

Head coaching record
- Regular season: 0–21–0 (.000)

Percell McGahee Gaskins (born April 25, 1972) is an American former professional football player who was a linebacker in the National Football League (NFL). He played college football for the Kansas State Wildcats. He was selected by the St. Louis Rams in the 4th round (105th overall) of the 1996 NFL draft.

== College career ==
While at Kansas State, Gaskins was a three-year starter on the football team between 1993 and 1995. Gaskins was also an accomplished high jumper on the Kansas State Wildcats track and field team, winning the 1993 high jump at the NCAA Division I Indoor Track and Field Championships with a jump of 2.27 meters.

== Professional career ==
=== St. Louis Rams ===
Gaskins was selected in the fourth round (105th overall) by the St. Louis Rams. As a rookie, he appeared in 15 games starting one. For the season he recorded 21 tackles and one fumble recovery.

=== Carolina Panthers ===
After being waived by the Rams after one season, Gaskins was claimed by the Carolina Panthers on August 26, 1997. In the 1997, Gaskins appeared in 12 games recording three tackles. He was cut by the Panthers on August 25, 1998.

== Coaching career ==
In 2014, Gaskins was named the head coach for the Garinger High School football team. After going 0–21 in two seasons, he resigned as head coach.
