= Regan Upshaw =

American football player (born 1975)

No. 73, 91, 98, 71
- Position: Defensive tackle

Personal information
- Born: August 12, 1975 (age 51); Berrien Springs, Michigan, U.S.
- Listed height: 6 ft 4 in (1.93 m)
- Listed weight: 265 lb (120 kg)

Career information
- High school: Pittsburg (Pittsburg, California)
- College: California
- NFL draft: 1996: 1st round, 12th overall pick

Career history
- Tampa Bay Buccaneers (1996–1999); Jacksonville Jaguars (1999); Oakland Raiders (2000–2002); Washington Redskins (2003); New York Giants (2004)

Awards and highlights
- First-team All-Pac-10 (1995); Second-team All-Pac-10 (1994)

Career NFL statistics
- Tackles: 169
- Sacks: 34.5
- Interceptions: 1
- Stats at Pro Football Reference

Regan Charles Upshaw (born August 12, 1975) is an American former professional football player who was a defensive tackle in the National Football League (NFL) between 1996 and 2004. He played college football for the California Golden Bears and was selected by the Tampa Bay Buccaneers in the first round of the 1996 NFL draft.

In high school, Upshaw played for Pittsburg High School (Pittsburg, California), helping defeat the previously undefeated De La Salle in the 1991 NCS championship game played at the Oakland Coliseum. The final score was 35–27. This was the last defeat De La Salle suffered before setting a national high school record of 151 straight victories. Upshaw, who did not play football until his sophomore year at Pittsburg, was a Parade All-America as a senior. He chose the University of California, Berkeley, and by his junior year was named All-American.

Pre-draft measurables
Height	Weight	Arm length	Hand span	40-yard dash	10-yard split	20-yard split	20-yard shuttle	Vertical jump	Broad jump	Bench press
6 ft 3 3/8 in (1.91 m)	249 lb (113 kg)	34 in (0.86 m)	9 1/2 in (0.24 m)	4.81 s	1.73 s	2.82 s	4.61 s	34.5 in (0.88 m)	10 ft 0 in (3.05 m)	25 reps

The Tampa Bay Buccaneers selected him in the first round with the 12th pick overall in the 1996 NFL Draft. He later played for the Jacksonville Jaguars, Oakland Raiders, Washington Redskins, and New York Giants. He also appeared in Super Bowl XXXVII while a member of the Raiders during the 2002 season. The team went on to lose the game 48–21 to one of Upshaw's former teams, the Buccaneers.
