= Kenny Wheaton =

American football player (born 1975)

No. 30
- Positions: Cornerback, safety

Personal information
- Born: March 8, 1975 (age 51); Phoenix, Arizona, U.S.
- Listed height: 5 ft 10 in (1.78 m)
- Listed weight: 204 lb (93 kg)

Career information
- High school: McClintock (Tempe, Arizona)
- College: Oregon
- NFL draft: 1997: 3rd round, 94th overall pick

Career history
- Dallas Cowboys (1997–1999); Detroit Fury (2002); Toronto Argonauts (2003–2008)

Awards and highlights
- Grey Cup champion (2004); CFL All-Star (2007); 4× CFL East All-Star (2005, 2006, 2007, 2008); 2× Second-team All-American (1995, 1996); First-team All-Pac-10 (1996); 2× Second-team All-Pac-10 (1994, 1995)

Career NFL statistics
- Tackles: 38
- Interceptions: 1
- Fumble recoveries: 2
- Stats at Pro Football Reference

Career AFL statistics
- Tackles: 32
- Interceptions: 2
- Passes defended: 5
- Stats at ArenaFan.com

Kenneth Tyron Wheaton (born March 8, 1975) is an American former professional football player who was a cornerback in the National Football League (NFL) for the Dallas Cowboys. He also was a member of the Toronto Argonauts in the Canadian Football League (CFL). He played college football at the University of Oregon.

== Early life ==
Wheaton attended McClintock High School, where he was a two-way player. As a senior he played strong safety and running back, registering 97 tackles (led the team), 669 rushing yards and 10 touchdowns. He received All-state and Mesa Tribune Area Defensive Player of the Year honors.

He accepted a football scholarship from the University of Oregon. He was a backup as a redshirt freshman. As a sophomore, he became a starter moving between free safety and right cornerback. He collected 60 tackles (fifth on the team) and 4 interceptions, while contributing to the team winning a Pac-10 Championship. He also made arguably the most famous play in Ducks history known as "The Pick". As time was winding down and the University of Washington was driving down to the Oregon nine-yard line, Wheaton intercepted a Damon Huard pass and ran it back for a touchdown not just to save the game, but it also signaled the start of a new era of winning football for Oregon. The play has long been shown on the replay boards at Autzen Stadium before every Ducks home game.

As a junior, he started 10 games at right cornerback, tallied 72 tackles (5 for loss), 5 interceptions and 2 sacks. As a senior, he started at left cornerback, posting 73 tackles (led the team), 15 passes defensed and 2 interceptions. He had a career-high 16 tackles against Arizona State University.

Wheaton finished his college career with 194 tackles, 10 interceptions and the school record of 380 yards on interception returns, breaking a 49-year record previously set by Jake Leicht. He had an interception return for a touchdown of 70-or-more yards in each of his 3 seasons as a starter.

In 2011, he was inducted into the University of Oregon Athletics Hall of Fame.

== Professional career ==
=== Dallas Cowboys ===
Wheaton was selected by the Dallas Cowboys in the third round (94th overall) of the 1997 NFL draft. His rookie season was a difficult one, a separated shoulder he suffered in a scrimmage against the Oakland Raiders, caused him to miss the first 3 pre-season games, he would return to play in the last exhibition game against the Tennessee Titans, but he re-injured the shoulder and was forced to miss the first 14 regular season games. He also missed time at the end of the year, in order to deal with the death of his younger brother (Derrek), who was killed in a drive-by shooting. He still would play in the last two contests, registering four tackles against the New York Giants in the season finale.

In 1998, after considering that he was the fifth cornerback on the depth chart and that Deion Sanders and Kevin Smith would be difficult to replace as starters, he asked the coaches to switch him to free safety. At his new position, although he was effective defending the pass, he had problems in run-support. He recorded 36 tackles, one interception and 2 fumble recoveries, playing mainly on the nickel defense.

In 1999, he suffered a knee injury while playing against the Indianapolis Colts in the eighth game, that placed him on the injured reserve list on November 16. The injury would turn to be career threatening and the Cowboys did not renew his contract at the end of the year.

=== Detroit Fury ===
In 2002, after being out of football for two years rehabbing his knee injury, he signed with the Detroit Fury of the Arena Football League, playing 9 games (6 starts). He was traded to the Colorado Crush during the offseason, only to be cut by the team in training camp.

=== Toronto Argonauts ===
In 2003, Wheaton signed with the Toronto Argonauts of the Canadian Football League and was their starting defensive half back.

In 2004, during a playoff game against the Hamilton Tiger-Cats, Wheaton intercepted a pass in the end zone. In a play reminiscent of "The Pick" in his famous college game, Wheaton returned an interception from deep in his own end for a touchdown, setting a CFL post-season record for the longest ever interception return for a touchdown (116 yards). He went on to help his team win the 92nd Grey Cup championship with the Argonauts that season.

Wheaton was named to CFL East Division All-Star team each year between 2005-2008. He was released on January 9, 2009.

== Personal life ==
His younger brother, Derrek, also attended McClintock High School playing varsity football, basketball, and baseball. He went on to play college football at Phoenix College and received a football scholarship to attend the University of Oregon. Derrek was killed on his way home from the Phoenix College football banquet, he was the random victim of a drive by shooting. The Arizona Junior High School Basketball Tournament honors his memory with the Derrek Wheaton MVP Award.

Wheaton's cousin, Markus Wheaton, played for Oregon State University and the Pittsburgh Steelers. His other cousin Marquese Wheaton played for the University of Southern Mississippi, and signed as an undrafted free agent with the Tampa Bay Buccaneers for the 2012 training camp.
