= Jared Tomich =

American football player (born 1974)

No. 90, 75
- Position: Defensive end

Personal information
- Born: April 24, 1974 (age 52); St. John, Indiana, U.S.
- Listed height: 6 ft 3 in (1.91 m)
- Listed weight: 281 lb (127 kg)

Career information
- High school: Lake Central (St. John)
- College: Nebraska
- NFL draft: 1997: 2nd round, 39th overall pick

Career history
- New Orleans Saints (1997–2000); Arizona Cardinals (2001)*; Green Bay Packers (2002); Kansas City Chiefs (2003)*
- * Offseason or practice squad member only

Awards and highlights
- 2× National champion (1994, 1995); First-team All-American (1996); Second-team All-American (1995); First-team All-Big 12 (1996); First-team All-Big Eight (1995)

Career NFL statistics
- Tackles: 56
- Sacks: 10
- Forced fumbles: 4
- Stats at Pro Football Reference

Jared James Tomich (born April 24, 1974) is an American former professional football player who was a defensive end in the National Football League (NFL). Tomich went to high school at Lake Central High School. Lake Central recently retired his number. Tomich played college football for the Nebraska Cornhuskers. Jared came to Nebraska as a Proposition 48 (NCAA) partial qualifier, but ended up becoming an All-American in both 1995 and 1996.

He played for the New Orleans Saints from 1997 to 2000 after being drafted by them in the second round of the 1997 NFL draft. He played one season for the Green Bay Packers in 2002–2003.
