= Aaron Graham =

American football player (born 1973)

No. 54, 68, 60
- Position: Center

Personal information
- Born: May 22, 1973 (age 53); Las Vegas, New Mexico, U.S.
- Listed height: 6 ft 4 in (1.93 m)
- Listed weight: 301 lb (137 kg)

Career information
- High school: Denton (Denton, Texas)
- College: Nebraska
- NFL draft: 1996: 4th round, 112th overall pick

Career history
- Arizona Cardinals (1996–1999); Kansas City Chiefs (2000)*; Las Vegas Outlaws (2001); Oakland Raiders (2001); Tennessee Titans (2002)
- * Offseason or practice squad member only

Awards and highlights
- 2× National champion (1994, 1995); First-team All-American (1995); First-team All-Big Eight (1995)

Career NFL statistics
- Games played: 92
- Games started: 40
- Fumble recoveries: 2
- Stats at Pro Football Reference

Aaron Geddes Graham (born May 22, 1973) is an American former professional football player who was a center who played six seasons in the National Football League (NFL) for the Arizona Cardinals (1996–1999), Oakland Raiders (2001), and Tennessee Titans (2002). Graham also played college football for the University of Nebraska–Lincoln from 1991 to 1995, where he played in three national championship games, winning two in 1994 and 1995.

== Early life ==
Graham attended Denton High School in Denton, Texas, where he played for the Denton Broncos high school football team.

== College career ==
Graham attended the University of Nebraska-Lincoln, where he played college football for the Nebraska Cornhuskers from 1991 to 1995 under head coach Tom Osborne. Graham played as the starting center for most of the 1993 through 1995 seasons, and played in three national championship games, winning two back-to-back in 1994 and 1995. During his 1993 season, Graham and the Cornhuskers entered the 1994 Orange Bowl ranked number 2 at 11–0 but lost to Florida State University. In 1994, Graham and the Cornhuskers finished the season with an 13–0 record, beating Miami for the national title in the 1995 Orange Bowl. In his senior season, Graham and the Cornhuskers won the rest of their regular season games, finishing 12–0. Nebraska won the championship game against Florida in the 1996 Fiesta Bowl, 62–24.

As a senior, Graham was named the 1995 AP All-American Football Player. He won multiple awards during his college career such as Academic All-American from 1994 to 1995 and the 1996 Top Eight Award that is given to the nation's elite scholar athletes. While playing college football for Nebraska he was also recognized by the NCAA for "athletic accomplishments, academic achievements, character, leadership and other activities".

== Professional career ==
Graham was selected by the Arizona Cardinals in the fourth round of the 1996 NFL draft. Graham played six seasons as center in the NFL with the Cardinals (1996–1999), Oakland Raiders (2001), and Tennessee Titans (2002). Graham was planning on going back for his seventh season with the Titans, but instead retired.
