= Heath Irwin =

American football player (born 1973)

No. 63, 66
- Position: Guard

Personal information
- Born: June 27, 1973 (age 53); Boulder, Colorado, U.S.
- Listed height: 6 ft 4 in (1.93 m)
- Listed weight: 300 lb (136 kg)

Career information
- High school: Boulder
- College: Colorado
- NFL draft: 1996: 4th round, 101st overall pick

Career history
- New England Patriots (1996–1999); Miami Dolphins (2000–2001); St. Louis Rams (2002); Denver Broncos (2003)*
- * Offseason or practice squad member only

Awards and highlights
- First-team All-American (1995); Second-team All-American (1994); First-team All-Big Eight (1995)

Career NFL statistics
- Games played: 87
- Games started: 29
- Fumble recoveries: 1
- Stats at Pro Football Reference

Heath Spencer Irwin (born June 27, 1973) is an American former professional football player who was a guard in the National Football League (NFL). He played for the New England Patriots, the Miami Dolphins, and the St. Louis Rams. He played college football for the Colorado Buffaloes after graduating from Boulder High School. He was selected with the 101st selection of the 1996 NFL draft by the Patriots.

He was both a high school football and college football All-American and a star offensive lineman on a record-setting Colorado offensive unit. In the NFL, his team made the playoffs in five of his first six seasons. He is both the son of a former Colorado football player and the nephew of another (Hale Irwin) who is a World Golf Hall of Fame member.

== Early life and college ==
Irwin played a lot of golf during his youth. Irwin was a high school All-American (by Super Prep and Tom Lemming's Prep Football Report) at Boulder High School, where he played offensive guard and defensive tackle. He also competed in the shot put and discus throw in high school. He was a 1995 College Football All-America Team first-team selection by the Associated Press for the 1995 Colorado Buffaloes football team and an honorable mention selection by the United Press International as a senior as well as a second-team All-American on the 1994 Colorado Buffaloes football team that had a record-setting 5,448 total net yards of offense including the famed Miracle at Michigan. Irwin scored a touchdown for the 1995 Colorado Buffaloes football team on October 28 against Nebraska. No other Colorado lineman scored a touchdown until Alex Kelley did in the September 2 season opener for the 2016 Colorado Buffaloes football team against Colorado State.

== Professional career ==
Irwin was drafted 101st overall with the sixth pick in the fourth round of the 1996 NFL draft by the New England Patriots. In 1999, he won a training camp battle with Max Lane and Todd Rucci for an opening day starting guard spot. He played 87 NFL regular season games, starting 29. He was a member of the Patriots from 1996 to 1999, the Dolphins in 2000 and 2001 and the 2002 St. Louis Rams. Irwin had signed a four-year $7 million ($13.1 million in 2025) contract with the Dolphins in February 2000 with a $2 million ($3.7 million in 2025) signing bonus. There, he was reunited with offensive line coach Paul Boudreau. Rams general manager Charley Armey had drafted Irwin for the Patriots, which led to his signing with the team. He also played in a total of 6 National Football League playoff games, starting 1, while being inactive for an additional three (including Super Bowl XXXI). While in the NFL, Irwin pursued his college degree through the NFL's continued education program. He was signed to play for the 2003 Denver Broncos, but he was waived at the end of training camp. His team went to the playoffs in five of his first six seasons, and the only losing team he played for was the 7–9 2002 Rams.

== Personal ==
His father Phil Irwin played football for Colorado from 1968 to 1970. He started at linebacker on the 1968 through 1970 teams. He had 4 interceptions for the 1969 Colorado Buffaloes football team. His uncle Hale Irwin played a variety of positions at Colorado ranging from quarterback to defensive back and punt returner on the 1964 through 1966 Colorado teams. He had 100 career rushing yards, 24 pass attempts and 9 interceptions (on defense). Hale Irwin has been described as an average quarterback who became an outstanding defensive back and earned first-team All-Big 8 Conference recognition in both 1965 and 1966 as a safety before becoming a Hall of Fame golfer. Heath's wife is named Molly, and they have both a daughter (Bailee) and a son (Houston). Bailee was born in 1998 and Houston in 2000. Irwin had contributed financially to the allegedly "cult-like" Resurrection Church, which had to remove promotional YouTube video content that depicted the campus and images of the University of Colorado brand because it violated the university policy. He served as a pallbearer at Rashaan Salaam's 2016 funeral.
