= Grant Wistrom =

American football player (born 1976)

No. 98, 96
- Position: Defensive end

Personal information
- Born: July 3, 1976 (age 50); Joplin, Missouri, U.S.
- Listed height: 6 ft 5 in (1.96 m)
- Listed weight: 272 lb (123 kg)

Career information
- High school: Webb City (Webb City, Missouri)
- College: Nebraska
- NFL draft: 1998: 1st round, 6th overall pick

Career history
- St. Louis Rams (1998–2003); Seattle Seahawks (2004–2006)

Awards and highlights
- Super Bowl champion (XXXIV); 3× National champion (1994, 1995, 1997); Lombardi Award (1997); Bill Willis Trophy (1996); 2× Consensus All-American (1996, 1997); Third-team All-American (1995); 2× First-team All-Big 12 (1996, 1997); First-team All-Big Eight (1995); 2× Big 12 Defensive Player of the Year (1996, 1997); Big 12 Conference All-Time football team (2010); Nebraska Cornhuskers Jersey No. 98 retired

Career NFL statistics
- Tackles: 413
- Sacks: 53
- Forced fumbles: 6
- Fumble recoveries: 8
- Interceptions: 5
- Defensive touchdowns: 2
- Stats at Pro Football Reference
- College Football Hall of Fame

Grant Alden Wistrom (born July 3, 1976) is an American former professional football player who was a defensive end in the National Football League (NFL) for nine seasons. Wistrom played college football for the Nebraska Cornhuskers and was a two-time All-American. He was selected in the first round of the 1998 NFL draft, and played in the NFL for the St. Louis Rams and Seattle Seahawks.

== Early life ==
Wistrom was born in Joplin, Missouri to Ron and Kathy Wistrom. For a short period of time, he went to Forest City Elementary School and Teague Middle School in Altamonte Springs, Florida. He began his football career in Webb City, Missouri, where he played for the Webb City High School football team, the Cardinals, as a defensive end and tight end. As a defensive end, he compiled 122 tackles, eight sacks, six fumble recoveries, nine forced fumbles and a blocked punt; as a tight end, he caught 30 passes for 527 yards and five touchdowns and rushed 11 times for 115 yards and three touchdowns. Wistrom led his team to two Class 4A state championships. He was chosen as a first-team high school All-America selection by Super Prep, Blue Chip and USA Today, and earned Top 100 Honors from Scholastic Coach magazine. Wistrom also played basketball and competed in track and field.

== College career ==
Wistrom attended the University of Nebraska–Lincoln, where he helped anchor the defensive line for the Nebraska Cornhuskers football team from 1994 to 1997. During his four-year college career, the Huskers compiled a 49–2 record, winning three national championships in that span (1994, 1995, and 1997). A two-time consensus first-team All-American, Wistrom became Nebraska's fourth Lombardi Award winner as the nation's top lineman following the 1997 season.

As a senior captain, the 6–5, 255-pound Wistrom finished with 51 tackles, including 8.5 sacks and 17 tackles for loss, leading the Blackshirts in both categories on his way to earning Big 12 Defensive Player-of-the-Year honors. A finalist for the Bronko Nagurski Defensive Player-of-the-Year award, Wistrom helped the Huskers rank fifth nationally in total defense and second nationally against the run. He led Nebraska to a perfect 13–0 season record. He was also a consensus All-American.

In 1996, Wistrom was named the Big 12 Defensive Player of the Year, helping NU to top-10 rankings in all four major defensive categories. A first-team All-American and finalist for the Nagurski Award. Wistrom finished third on the team in tackles with 75. while leading the Huskers in both sacks (9.5-48 yards lost) and tackles for loss (20–74).

A third-team All-American as a sophomore. Wistrom recorded 44 stops, including a team-leading 15 tackles for loss, as Nebraska went 12-0 and repeated as national champions. He also had four sacks, earning first-team All-Big Eight honors as NU ranked second nationally against the rush, fourth in points allowed and 13th in total defense. During his freshman campaign, Wistrom made his presence known, earning Big Eight Newcomer-of-the-Year honors in helping the Huskers to their first national title since 1971. He played in all 13 games, recording 36 stops and 4.5 sacks, as one of only two true Husker freshmen to see playing time.

Wistrom holds the school record for tackles for loss with 58.5 for 260 yards and ranks second with 26.5 sacks, had his No. 98 jersey retired during the 1998 season. His career totals include 206 total tackles, 26.5 sacks for 178 yards, one interception, four forced fumbles and one fumble recovery.

Wistrom was a two-time first-team CoSIDA Academic All-American and became the 13th Husker to win the NCAA's highest honor, the NCAA Top Eight Award, in 1997. He also earned the National Football Foundation and College Football Hall of Fame Postgraduate Scholarship following his senior campaign and was the Big 12 Male Athlete of the Year for the 1997–98 season. He graduated with a 3.43 GPA. Honors include:

- College Football Hall of Fame member (2009)
- Voted as DE on the All-Time Cornhusker team
- Recipient of the Lombardi Award, given to nation's top collegiate lineman (1997)
- Recipient of the Bill Willis Trophy, given to nations top defensive lineman (1996)
- Consensus All-America 1996, 1997
- All-Big 12 Conference First-team (1996, 1997)
- Big 12 Defensive Player of the Year (1996, 1997)
- Consensus Academic All-America (1996, 1997)
- Academic All-Big 12 honors (1996, 1997)
- Earned third-team All-America honors by Associated Press and first-team All-Big Eight Conference honors sophomore season (1995)
- Selected as Newcomer of the Year by Big Eight conference freshman season (1994)

=== Collegiate statistics ===
Season	Team	Class	GP	Tackles					Interceptions					Fumbles			
Season	Team	Class	GP	Cmb	Solo	Ast	TfL	Sck	Int	Yds	Lng	TD	PD	FF	FR	Yds	TD
1994	Nebraska	Fr	13	39	16	23	6.5	4.5	0	0	0	0	0	0	0	0	0
1995	Nebraska	So	12	49	24	25	16	5	0	0	0	0	0	1	0	0	0
1996	Nebraska	Jr	13	80	33	47	21	9.5	1	0	0	0	0	1	1	31	1
1997	Nebraska	Sr	13	53	30	23	18	8.5	0	0	0	3	3	1	0	0	0
Career			51	221	103	118	61.5	27.5	1	0	0	1	3	4	1	0	0

Notes - Statistics include bowl game performances.

== Professional career ==
=== Pre-draft ===
Pre-draft measurables
Height	Weight	Arm length	Hand span
6 ft 4 7/8 in (1.95 m)	273 lb (124 kg)	33 7/8 in (0.86 m)	10 1/8 in (0.26 m)
All values from Pro Day

Wistrom was considered a "high energy player who (was) both durable and versatile and good against the run and pass", Even after adding 15 pounds to his frame, Wistrom ran a personal best 4.61 40-yard dash at the University of Nebraska NFL pro day. Wistrom measured 6 ft 4 7/8 in (1.953 m) and 273 lb (124 kg) at his pro day workout.

=== St. Louis Rams ===
Wistrom was selected by the St. Louis Rams in the first round as the sixth overall pick in the 1998 NFL draft. On July 25, 1998, Wistrom signed a six-year, $12.765 million contract that included a $6 million signing bonus.

1998: Played in 13 games on defense and special teams and finished season with 30 tackles, three sacks, one fumble recovery and five special teams tackles and was named Rams Defensive Rookie of the Year by coaches.

1999: Started all 16 regular season and three playoff games at right defensive end and was selected to the 1999 All-Madden team by Fox Sports announcer John Madden while setting career highs in tackles (60), sacks (6.5), interceptions (two), interception returns for touchdown (two), passes defensed (seven), and one fumble recovery. Grant tied for team lead with two interceptions returned for touchdown. Won Super Bowl XXXIV.

2000: Started 16 games at right defensive end and had a career year, registering career-bests in tackles (71), sacks (11), and had 29 quarterback pressures, four passes defensed and one forced fumble, tying for seventh in NFC in sacks.

2001: Had best season of his career to date with recording a new career-highs with 96 tackles (47 solo) and two forced fumbles, and tied career bests with two interceptions and one fumble recovery. He finished second on the team with 9 sacks and had three passes defensed and 19 quarterback pressures and was 10th in NFC in sacks. In post-season action, he finished fifth on team with career-high 19 postseason tackles (11 solo) and second on club with two sacks.

2002: Played in 15 games with 14 starts. Finished season with another career-high 97 tackles (43 solo), including four for loss and also tallied 4.5 sacks, one interception, three passes defensed, one forced fumble, and career-high two fumble recoveries.

2003: Started all 16 regular season games and one postseason game for the Rams. Recorded career-high 108 tackles (57 solo) with 7.5 sacks, a forced fumble and a fumble recovery and four passes defensed.

=== Seattle Seahawks ===
After six seasons, including two Super Bowl appearances and one Super Bowl win, with the St. Louis Rams, Wistrom became a free agent. On March 4, 2004, he signed a six-year, $33 million contract that included a $14 million signing bonus with the Seattle Seahawks.

2004: Started all nine games he played. Suffered knee injury at New England (October 17, 2004) and was forced to miss weeks 7–10. Returned to play four games before reinjuring knee and missed the final three games and Wild Card Playoff Game. Finished the season with 38 total tackles (27 solo), 3.5 sacks, four passes defensed, a forced fumble, and a fumble recovery.

2005: Started all 16 regular season games. Finished the season with 52 tackles (41 solo), 4.0 sacks and six passes defensed, the second most he had ever recorded.

2006: Started all 16 regular season games (the fifth time in his nine-year professional career). Finished the season with 37 tackles (30 solo), 4.0 sacks, one forced fumble, one fumble recovery and one pass defensed. However, he played only 56 percent of the downs because of injuries and the arrival of pass-rushing linebacker Julian Peterson in free agency. Peterson replaced Wistrom as the right end in passing situations. As a result, Wistrom had his fewest tackles since his rookie season with the Rams.

Wistrom was released after the 2006 season after the Seahawks asked Wistrom to restructure his contract to reduce the $3.5 million salary he was due in 2007. The other option was being released, and Wistrom decided to go that route and later retired. Wistrom had collected $21 million of his free agent contract in those three seasons.

=== NFL statistics ===
Year	Team	Games	Combined tackles	Tackles	Assisted tackles	Sacks	Forced fumbles	Fumble recoveries
1998	STL	13	20	14	6	3.0	0	1
1999	STL	16	39	32	7	6.5	0	1
2000	STL	16	63	50	13	11.0	1	0
2001	STL	15	54	44	10	9.0	2	1
2002	STL	15	47	44	3	4.5	1	2
2003	STL	16	60	49	11	7.5	1	1
2004	SEA	9	37	27	10	3.5	1	1
2005	SEA	16	52	41	11	4.0	0	0
2006	SEA	16	37	30	7	4.0	1	1
Career		132	409	331	78	53.0	7	8

== Notes ==
- Grant logged his first sack in the NFL by forcing San Francisco 49ers quarterback Steve Young out of bounds in the first quarter on October 25, 1998.
- Grant made his first interception in the NFL and returned it 91 yards for a touchdown against the Atlanta Falcons on October 17, 1999. The interception return was sixth longest in St Louis Rams franchise history and longest ever by Rams' defensive lineman.
- Grant registered his career-high 17 tackles, including a career-high 10 solo, against the Baltimore Ravens on November 9, 2003.
- Grant's older brother, Chance played college football at the University of Central Missouri. Grant's brother Tracey joined Grant at The University of Nebraska-Lincoln. Tracey was also drafted into the NFL, one of the last picks of the 2002 NFL draft, but never played beyond the preseason.
- Grant is the all-time career TFL (tackle-for-loss) leader in the playoffs (with 18 TFL).
