= Ink Aleaga =

American gridiron football player (born 1973)

Profile
- Position: Linebacker

Personal information
- Born: April 27, 1973 (age 53); Honolulu, Hawaii, U.S.
- Listed height: 6 ft 1 in (1.85 m)
- Listed weight: 241 lb (109 kg)

Career information
- High school: Maryknoll School
- College: Washington Huskies

Career history
- 1997–1999: New Orleans Saints
- 2002: BC Lions

Awards and highlights
- 2× First-team All-Pac-10 (1995, 1996); Second-team All-Pac-10 (1994)
- Stats at Pro Football Reference

Ink A. Aleaga (born April 27, 1973) is a former gridiron football linebacker who played for the New Orleans Saints of the National Football League (NFL) and the BC Lions of the Canadian Football League (CFL). He played college football for the Washington Huskies. He appeared in 26 games, starting six, for the Saints from 1997 to 1999. In 2002, Aleaga played in two games for the Lions and recorded nine tackles.
