= 1995 All-Pacific-10 Conference football team =

The 1995 All-Pacific-10 Conference football team consisted of American football players chosen by various organizations for All-Pacific-10 Conference teams for the 1995 Pacific-10 Conference football season.

Seven of the conference's teams had at least three players represented on the All-Pac 10 first team as follows:

- Conference co-champion USC was ranked No. 12 in the final AP Poll and placed four players on the first team: wide receiver and Pac-10 Offensive Player of the Year Keyshawn Johnson, offensive lineman John Michels, defensive lineman Darrell Russell, and punter John Stonehouse.
- Conference co-champion Washington placed three on the first team: tight end Ernie Conwell, linebacker Ink Aleaga, and defensive back Lawyer Milloy.
- Oregon was ranked No. 18 in the final AP Poll and placed three on the first team: running back and Pac-10 all-purpose player of the year Ricky Whittle, linebacker Jeremy Asher, and defensive back Alex Molden.
- Fourth-place Stanford placed three on the first team: offensive lineman Jeff Buckley, placekicker Eric Abrams, and return specialist Damon Dunn.
- UCLA, tied for fifth place, placed three on the first team: running back Abdul-Karim al-Jabbar and offensive lineman Jonathan Ogden and Mike Flanagan.
- Arizona, also tied for fifth place, placed three, all defenders, on the first team: Pac-10 Defensive Player of the Year Tedy Bruschi, defensive lineman Chuck Osborne, and defensive back Brandon Sanders.
- Arizona State placed three, all on offense, on the first team: quarterback Jake Plummer, wide receive Keith Poole, and offensive lineman Juan Roque.

== Offensive selections ==
=== Quarterbacks ===
- Jake Plummer, Arizona State (Coaches-1)
- Mark Butterfield, Stanford (Coaches-2)

=== Running backs ===
- Abdul-Karim al-Jabbar, UCLA (Coaches-1)
- Ricky Whittle, Oregon (Coaches-1)
- Rashaan Shehee, Washington (Coaches-2)
- Anthony Bookman, Stanford (Coaches-2)

=== Wide receivers ===
- Keyshawn Johnson, USC (Coaches-1)
- Keith Poole, Arizona State (Coaches-1)
- Cristin McLemore, Oregon (Coaches-2)
- Mark Harris, Stanford (Coaches-2)

=== Tight ends ===
- Ernie Conwell, Washington (Coaches-1)
- Johnny McWilliams, USC (Coaches-2)

=== Offensive linemen ===
- Jonathan Ogden, UCLA (Coaches-1)
- Jeff Buckley, Stanford (Coaches-1)
- Mike Flanagan, UCLA (Coaches-1)
- John Michels, USC (Coaches-1)
- Juan Roque, Arizona State (Coaches-1)
- Paul Wiggins, Oregon (Coaches-2)
- Trevor Highfield, Washington (Coaches-2)
- Tim Camp, Oregon State (Coaches-2)
- Scott Sanderson, Washington State (Coaches-2)
- Tarik Glenn, California (Coaches-2)
- Benji Olson, Washington (Coaches-2)

== Defensive selections ==
=== Defensive linemen ===
- Tedy Bruschi, Arizona (Coaches-1)
- Regan Upshaw, California (Coaches-1)
- Chuck Osborne, Arizona (Coaches-1)
- Darrell Russell, USC (Coaches-1)
- Dwayne Sanders, Washington State (Coaches-2)
- Troy Bailey, Oregon (Coaches-2)
- Israel Ifeanyi, USC (Coaches-2)
- Tom Holmes, Oregon State (Coaches-2)

=== Linebackers ===
- Jeremy Asher, Oregon (Coaches-1)
- Ink Aleaga, Washington (Coaches-1)
- Duane Clemons, California (Coaches-1)
- Chris Hayes, Washington State (Coaches-2)
- James Darling, Washington State (Coaches-2)
- Kane Rogers, Oregon State (Coaches-2)

=== Defensive backs ===
- Lawyer Milloy, Washington (Coaches-1)
- Brandon Sanders, Arizona (Coaches-1)
- Alex Molden, Oregon (Coaches-1)
- Reggie Tongue, Oregon State (Coaches-1)
- Sammy Knight, USC (Coaches-2)
- Mitchell Freedman, Arizona State (Coaches-2)
- Kelly Malveaux, Arizona (Coaches-2)
- Kenny Wheaton, Oregon (Coaches-2)

== Special teams ==
=== Placekickers ===
- Eric Abrams, Stanford (Coaches-1)
- Ryan Longwell, California (Coaches-2)

=== Punters ===
- John Stonehouse, USC (Coaches-1)
- George Martin, Washington State (Coaches-2)

=== Return specialists ===
- Damon Dunn, Stanford (Coaches-1)
- Paul Guidry, UCLA (Coaches-2)

=== All purpose ===
- Ricky Whittle, Oregon (Coaches-1)
- Na'il Benjamin, California (Coaches-2)
- Pat Tillman, Arizona State (Coaches-2)

== Miscellaneous ==
- Offensive Player of the Year: Keyshawn Johnson (Coaches)
- Defensive Player of the Year: Tedy Bruschi (Coaches)

== Key ==
Coaches = selected by the league's coaches

== See also ==
- 1995 College Football All-America Team
