= Jon Harris (American football) =

American football player (born 1974)

No. 90
- Position: Defensive end

Personal information
- Born: June 9, 1974 (age 52); Brooklyn, New York, U.S.
- Listed height: 6 ft 7 in (2.01 m)
- Listed weight: 300 lb (136 kg)

Career information
- High school: Kellenberg Memorial (Uniondale, New York)
- College: Virginia
- NFL draft: 1997: 1st round, 25th overall pick

Career history
- Philadelphia Eagles (1997–1998); Green Bay Packers (1999)*; Cleveland Browns (1999); Green Bay Packers (1999); New England Patriots (2000)*; Oakland Raiders (2001)*; Berlin Thunder (2001); Oakland Raiders (2002)*
- * Offseason or practice squad member only

Career NFL statistics
- Total tackles: 59
- Sacks: 2
- Fumble recoveries: 1
- Stats at Pro Football Reference

Jonathan Cecil Harris (born June 9, 1974) is an American former professional football player who was a defensive end in the National Football League (NFL) for the Philadelphia Eagles, Cleveland Browns, and the Green Bay Packers. He played college football at the University of Virginia and was selected in the first round (25th overall) of the 1997 NFL draft. He currently resides in Swedesboro, New Jersey.

== Professional career ==
After the 1998 NFL season, the Philadelphia Eagles traded Harris to the Green Bay Packers in exchange for John Michels, but Harris never played for the Packers. In his two-season career, Harris played in 24 games (starting eight), and recorded two sacks.
