= Alex Molden =

American football player (born 1973)

No. 25, 40
- Position: Cornerback

Personal information
- Born: August 4, 1973 (age 53); Detroit, Michigan, U.S.
- Listed height: 5 ft 10 in (1.78 m)
- Listed weight: 190 lb (86 kg)

Career information
- High school: Sierra (Colorado Springs, Colorado)
- College: Oregon
- NFL draft: 1996: 1st round, 11th overall pick

Career history
- New Orleans Saints (1996–2000); San Diego Chargers (2001–2002); Washington Redskins (2003)*; Detroit Lions (2003)
- * Offseason or practice squad member only

Awards and highlights
- First-team All-American (1995); 2× First-team All-Pac-10 (1994, 1995)

Career NFL statistics
- Tackles: 298
- Sacks: 8
- Interceptions: 12
- Forced fumbles: 5
- Stats at Pro Football Reference

Alex M. Molden (born August 4, 1973) is an American former professional football player who was a cornerback in the National Football League (NFL). He played college football for the Oregon Ducks and was selected by the New Orleans Saints in the first round with the 11th overall pick of the 1996 NFL draft. He played between 1996 and 2004 for the New Orleans Saints, the San Diego Chargers and the Detroit Lions.

== College career ==
Molden played college football at the University of Oregon and was on the team that reached the 1995 Rose Bowl. He was redshirted in 1991. In 1992 he had 55 tackles, four interceptions, and 19 passes broken up. He suffered a devastating knee injury in the Independence Bowl, and tore his anterior cruciate, medial collateral and posterior cruciate ligaments. He came back after a nine-month rehabilitation to start nine games in 1993. He was selected as an All-Pacific 10 cornerback in 1994, and was an All-Pacific 10/Football Coaches Association All-American and Associated Press second-team All-American in 1995.

== Professional career ==
Pre-draft measurables
Height	Weight	Arm length	Hand span	40-yard dash	10-yard split	20-yard split	20-yard shuttle	Vertical jump	Broad jump
5 ft 9 1/2 in (1.77 m)	186 lb (84 kg)	32 1/8 in (0.82 m)	9 5/8 in (0.24 m)	4.47 s	1.54 s	2.57 s	3.98 s	40.0 in (1.02 m)	10 ft 3 in (3.12 m)
All values from NFL Combine

== NFL career statistics ==
Legend
**Bold**	Career high

=== Regular season ===
Year	Team	Games		Tackles				Interceptions				Fumbles			
Year	Team	GP	GS	Comb	Solo	Ast	Sck	Int	Yds	TD	Lng	FF	FR	Yds	TD
1996	NOR	14	2	21	17	4	2.0	2	2	0	2	0	0	0	0
1997	NOR	16	15	68	57	**11**	**4.0**	0	0	0	0	**3**	**2**	0	0
1998	NOR	16	15	62	54	8	0.0	2	**35**	0	**24**	2	0	0	0
1999	NOR	13	0	15	13	2	0.0	1	2	0	2	0	0	0	0
2000	NOR	15	6	33	24	9	0.0	**3**	24	0	**24**	0	0	0	0
2001	SDG	6	3	19	18	1	0.0	1	0	0	0	0	0	0	0
2002	SDG	16	16	**79**	**68**	**11**	2.0	**3**	9	0	8	0	**2**	0	0
2003	DET	2	0	1	1	0	0.0	0	0	0	0	0	0	0	0
		98	57	298	252	46	8.0	12	72	0	24	5	4	0	0

=== Playoffs ===
Year	Team	Games		Tackles				Interceptions				Fumbles			
Year	Team	GP	GS	Comb	Solo	Ast	Sck	Int	Yds	TD	Lng	FF	FR	Yds	TD
2000	NOR	2	2	6	5	1	0.0	0	0	0	0	1	0	0	0
		2	2	6	5	1	0.0	0	0	0	0	1	0	0	0

== Personal life ==
Alex Molden and his wife, Christin, have eight children. His son Elijah played college football at Washington and was selected by the Tennessee Titans in the third round of the 2021 NFL draft. Currently, Molden is a motivational speaker located in Portland.
