= 1994 All-Pacific-10 Conference football team =

The 1994 All-Pacific-10 Conference football team consists of American football players chosen by various organizations for All-Pacific-10 Conference teams for the 1994 Pacific-10 Conference football season. The conference coaches selected an All-Pac-12 team and also selected Washington running back Napoleon Kaufman as the Pac-10 player of the year.

The Pac-10 champion 1994 Oregon Ducks football team led with five players who received first-team honors, including quarterback Danny O'Neil and all-purpose player Ricky Whittle. Arizona, UCLA, Washington, and Washington State each had four players who received first-team honors.

== Offensive selections ==
=== Quarterbacks ===
- Danny O'Neil, Oregon (Coaches-1)
- Steve Stenstrom, Stanford (Coaches-2)

=== Running backs ===
- Napoleon Kaufman, Washington (Coaches-1)
- Ontiwaun Carter, Arizona St. (Coaches-1)
- J. J. Young, Oregon St. (Coaches-2)
- Abdul-Karim al-Jabbar, UCLA (Coaches-2)

=== Wide receivers ===
- Justin Armour, Stanford (Coaches-1)
- Keyshawn Johnson, USC (Coaches-1)
- Kevin Jordan, UCLA (Coaches-2)
- Eric Bjornson, Washington (Coaches-2)

=== Tight ends ===
- Mark Bruener, Washington (Coaches-1)
- Tony Cline Jr., Stanford (Coaches-2)

=== Offensive linemen ===
- Tony Boselli, USC (Coaches-1)
- Jonathan Ogden, UCLA (Coaches-1)
- Frank Garcia, Washington (Coaches-1)
- Warner Smith, Arizona (Coaches-1)
- Mike Flanagan, UCLA (Coaches-1)
- Hicham El-Mashtoub, Arizona (Coaches-2)
- Brad Badger, Stanford (Coaches-2)
- John Feinga, Oregon St. (Coaches-2)
- Andrew Peterson, Washington (Coaches-2)
- Jeff Kysar, Arizona St. (Coaches-2)

== Defensive selections ==
=== Defensive tackles ===
- Chad Eaton, Washington St. (Coaches-1)
- Don Sasa, Washington St. (Coaches-1)
- Jason Fisk, Stanford (Coaches-2)
- Ken Talanoa, Arizona St. (Coaches-2)

=== Defensive ends ===
- DeWayne Patterson, Washington St. (Coaches-1)
- Tedy Bruschi, Arizona (Coaches-1)
- Regan Upshaw, California (Coaches-2)
- Troy Bailey, Oregon (Coaches-2)

=== Linebackers ===
- Jerrott Willard, California (Coaches-1)
- Mark Fields, Washington St. (Coaches-1)
- Sean Harris, Arizona (Coaches-1)
- Donnie Edwards, UCLA (Coaches-1)
- Ink Aleaga, Washington (Coaches-2)
- Jeremy Asher, Oregon (Coaches-2)
- Ron Childs, Washington St. (Coaches-2)
- Brian Williams, USC (Coaches-2)

=== Defensive backs ===
- Chad Cota, Oregon (Coaches-1)
- Lawyer Milloy, Washington (Coaches-1)
- Alex Molden, Oregon (Coaches-1)
- Torey Hunter, Washington St. (Coaches-2)
- Kenny Wheaton, Oregon (Coaches-2)
- Singor Mobley, Washington St. (Coaches-2)
- Reggie Tongue, Oregon St. (Coaches-2)

== Special teams ==
=== Placekickers ===
- Steve McLaughlin, Arizona (Coaches-1)
- Jon Baker, Arizona St. (Coaches-2)

=== Punters ===
- Darren Schager, UCLA (Coaches-1)
- John Stonehouse, USC (Coaches-2)

=== Return specialists/All purpose ===
- Herman O'Berry, Oregon (Coaches-1)
- Ricky Whittle, Oregon (Coaches-1)
- Na'il Benjamin, California (Coaches-2)
- Tyrone Edwards, California (Coaches-2)

== Key ==
Coaches = selected by the conference coaches

== See also ==
- 1994 College Football All-America Team
