= Keyshawn Johnson =

American football player (born 1972)

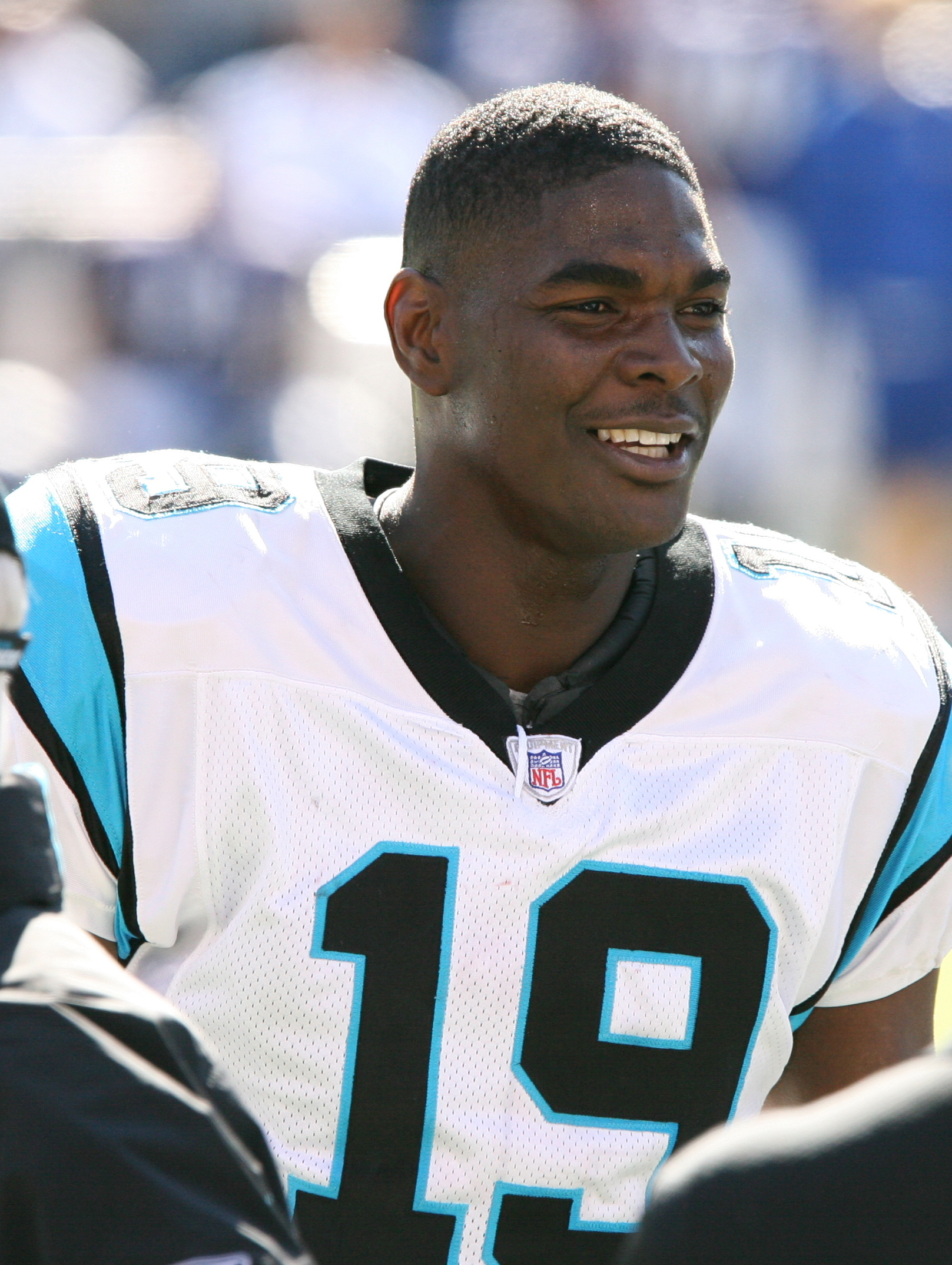
- Johnson with the Carolina Panthers in 2006

No. 19
- Position: Wide receiver

Personal information
- Born: July 22, 1972 (age 54); Los Angeles, California, U.S.
- Listed height: 6 ft 4 in (1.93 m)
- Listed weight: 211 lb (96 kg)

Career information
- High school: Susan Miller Dorsey (Los Angeles, California)
- College: West Los Angeles (1991–1993); USC (1994–1995)
- NFL draft: 1996: 1st round, 1st overall pick

Career history
- New York Jets (1996–1999); Tampa Bay Buccaneers (2000–2003); Dallas Cowboys (2004–2005); Carolina Panthers (2006)

Awards and highlights
- Super Bowl champion (XXXVII); 3× Pro Bowl (1998, 1999, 2001); Paul Warfield Trophy (1995); Unanimous All-American (1995); Third-team All-American (1994); Pac-10 Offensive Player of the Year (1995); 2× First-team All-Pac-10 (1994, 1995)

Career NFL statistics
- Receptions: 814
- Receiving yards: 10,571
- Receiving touchdowns: 64
- Stats at Pro Football Reference

Joseph Keyshawn Johnson (born July 22, 1972) is an American former professional football wide receiver who played in the National Football League (NFL) for 11 seasons.

He played college football for the USC Trojans, and earned All-American honors twice. He was selected first overall by the New York Jets in the 1996 NFL draft. He also played for the Tampa Bay Buccaneers, Dallas Cowboys, and Carolina Panthers. He was one of three wide receivers to be taken first overall in NFL draft history and the most recent. During his tenure with the Buccaneers, Johnson was a member of the team that won Super Bowl XXXVII in 2003.

He retired from football following the 2006 season, and spent seven years as a television broadcaster for the sports channel ESPN. He was one of the co-hosts of the FS1 weekday morning debate show Undisputed with Richard Sherman, Michael Irvin, and Skip Bayless. Following the cancellation of that show, he joined Paul Pierce and Joy Taylor to co-host the FS1 weekday show Speak, and remained in that role until 2025.

== Early life ==
Johnson was born in Los Angeles, California. He attended Palisades High School for his sophomore and junior years and then Susan Miller Dorsey High School, also in Los Angeles, for his senior year. Though a standout prospect at football, Johnson's early life was plagued by gang crime and legal troubles. In eighth grade, he spent nine months in a California youth facility after being arrested for possession of marijuana, cocaine, and a concealed handgun. His low SAT scores forced him to start his college football career in community college.

== College career ==
In Johnson's first year at West Los Angeles College, he lasted just 8 games. Eventually he just stopped showing up for practice. "For years, I was the good kid, but I was curious and it eventually got the best of me," he later wrote. "I started hanging out with the wrong crowd and got myself into trouble." After sitting out the following year to get his affairs in order, Johnson returned to football in 1992, and performed well enough to earn himself a transfer to University of Southern California, where he played for coach John Robinson's USC Trojans football team in 1994 and 1995. In 1994, he finished with 66 catches for 1,362 yards and 9 touchdowns. In 1995, he finished with 102 catches for 1,434 yards and 7 touchdowns.

As a Trojan, he was twice recognized as an All-American selection. After the 1994 college season, Johnson helped lead the Trojans to a win in the 1995 Cotton Bowl Classic, after which he was named the game's Most Valuable Player. He was named Pac-10 Offensive Player of the Year for the 1995 season. The Trojans then played in the 1996 Rose Bowl, during which Johnson caught 12 passes for a Rose Bowl record 216 yards and one touchdown in the Trojans' 41–32 victory over the Northwestern Wildcats. He was named the Player of the Game. He was inducted into the Rose Bowl Hall of Fame on December 31, 2008.

While in college, Johnson appeared on the TV show Coach, as a player eligible for draft in the upcoming season. He flatly refused to be recruited to the fictional "Orlando Breakers" team for coach Hayden Fox, stating he would go to Canada to play first. Johnson graduated from USC with a B.A. in social sciences and history in 1997.

== Professional career ==
Pre-draft measurables
Height	Weight	Arm length	Hand span	20-yard shuttle	Vertical jump
6 ft 3 1/4 in (1.91 m)	220 lb (100 kg)	33 1/2 in (0.85 m)	10 7/8 in (0.28 m)	4.25 s	31.5 in (0.80 m)
All values from NFL Combine

=== New York Jets ===
The New York Jets drafted Johnson with the first overall pick in the 1996 NFL draft. He was the third wide receiver selected with the number one overall pick, and the first since Irving Fryar was chosen by the New England Patriots in 1984. While in New York, he played three seasons (1997–1999) under Bill Parcells, who in two seasons would turnaround the Jets from 1–15 in 1996, Johnson's rookie year, to 9–7 in 1997, and 12–4 in 1998 and the franchise's first ever AFC East Division title.

In the 1996 season, Johnson had 63 receptions for 844 yards and eight touchdowns as a rookie.

In the 1997 season, Johnson had 70 receptions for 963 yards and five touchdowns.

In the 1998 season opener, Johnson had nine receptions for 126 yards and two touchdowns in the 36–30 overtime road loss to the San Francisco 49ers. In the 1998 season, Johnson had 83 receptions for 1,131 yards and ten touchdowns. He was named as a Pro Bowler for the first time.

In the 1999 season opener, Johnson had eight receptions for a career-high 194 yards and one touchdown in the 30–28 loss to the New England Patriots. In Week 12, he had 11 receptions for 144 yards and two touchdowns in the 28–20 win over the Miami Dolphins. In the 1999 season, Johnson had 89 receptions for 1,170 yards and eight touchdowns. He was named to his second Pro Bowl. In the Divisional Round against the Jacksonville Jaguars, he had nine receptions for 121 yards and one receiving touchdown to go with a rushing touchdown, a fumble recovery, and an intercepted pass on defense.

=== Tampa Bay Buccaneers ===
Johnson was traded on April 12, 2000, to the Tampa Bay Buccaneers for two first round draft choices (13th – John Abraham – and 27th – Anthony Becht – overall) in the 2000 NFL draft. Soon after Johnson arrived in Tampa Bay, they signed him to an 8-year, $56 million contract extension with the Buccaneers that made him the highest-paid wide receiver in the NFL. In Week 9 of the 2000 season, he had six receptions for 121 yards and a touchdown in a 41–13 win over the Minnesota Vikings. In Week 16 against the St. Louis Rams, he had seven receptions for 116 yards and two touchdowns in the 38–35 victory. In the 2000 season, he had 71 receptions for 874 yards and eight touchdowns.

In Week 5 of the 2001 season, Johnson had eight receptions for 140 yards in the 31–28 overtime loss on the road against the Tennessee Titans. In Week 6, he had ten receptions for 159 yards in a 17–10 loss to the Pittsburgh Steelers. In the 2001 season, Johnson had 106 receptions for 1,266 yards and one touchdown in 15 games. He was named to his third Pro Bowl.

At that time he was joining a team that had fallen one game short of the Super Bowl the previous season. In Week 5 of the 2002 season, he had six receptions for 131 yards and a touchdown in the 20–6 win over the Atlanta Falcons. In Week 9, he had nine receptions for 133 yards and two touchdowns in a 38–24 win over the Minnesota Vikings. In Week 16, he had eight receptions for 132 yards and a touchdown in a 17–7 loss to the Pittsburgh Steelers. In 2002 Johnson went on to win a Super Bowl with the Buccaneers after the arrival of new head coach Jon Gruden, who succeeded Tony Dungy. Johnson had 76 catches for 1,088 yards and five touchdowns; in the playoffs, he had eight catches for 125 yards and a touchdown against the Eagles, then had six grabs for 69 yards in the Super Bowl.

In Week 9 of the 2003 season, Johnson had ten receptions for 123 yards in a 17–14 loss to the New Orleans Saints. His bitter relationship with Gruden (illustrated by a video clip of him yelling at Gruden on the sidelines) led to his de-activation for the final seven games of the 2003 season. He had 45 receptions for 600 yards and three touchdowns in ten games in the 2003 season. The following offseason, he was traded to the Dallas Cowboys, where he was reunited with Bill Parcells, his coach while he was with the New York Jets.

=== Dallas Cowboys ===
On March 19, 2004, the Tampa Bay Buccaneers traded him to the Dallas Cowboys for Joey Galloway, who the Cowboys had also traded two first round picks to acquire. Reunited with his former head coach Bill Parcells, Johnson lived up to his advance billing for the Cowboys in 2004, leading the team in receiving yards and tying for the lead in touchdown catches while taking over a leadership role in the locker room and on the field. He had two games on the season going over 100 yards.

In Week 6 of the 2005 season, Johnson had eight receptions for 120 yards in a 16–13 overtime win over the New York Giants. In the 2005 season, Johnson had 71 receptions for 839 yards and six touchdowns.

On March 16, 2006, the Cowboys released Johnson to make room for recently acquired receiver Terrell Owens.

=== Carolina Panthers ===
On March 23, 2006, Johnson signed a four-year, $14-million-dollar deal with the Carolina Panthers. Of this, he was guaranteed a $5 million signing bonus. He was expected to play opposite Steve Smith as the number two receiver.

In Week 2, Johnson had five receptions for 106 yards in the 16–13 overtime road loss. During the Carolina Panthers' Monday Night Football game against the Buccaneers on November 13, 2006 in Week 10, Johnson became the first player in NFL history to score a touchdown on Monday Night Football with four teams (Jets, Buccaneers, Cowboys and Panthers). Johnson was released from the Panthers on May 1, 2007, after just one season with the team. He posted 70 receptions for 815 yards and four touchdowns in Carolina.

== Retirement and legacy ==
On May 23, 2007, Johnson announced he was retiring from the NFL, reportedly turning down offers by several teams, including the Tennessee Titans. Titans head coach Jeff Fisher, who became friends with Johnson while he played at USC, said he thought Johnson's numbers and production spoke for themselves: "He still played at a high-level last year. He takes very good care of himself," Fisher said. "He hasn't had any injuries per season. Anytime you get a chance to bring an experienced veteran in to add to your roster then it's a good thing." On the same day, Johnson announced he would be working as an analyst for ESPN.

On February 5, 2008, CBS4 Miami reported that Bill Parcells reached out to Johnson. Parcells reportedly told him if he was to come out of retirement there would be a spot on the Miami Dolphins roster for him.

His all-around game has earned him selection to the Pro Bowl three times – 1998 and 1999 with the New York Jets and 2001 with Tampa Bay. Johnson finished his career with 814 receptions, tying him at 17th all-time with Henry Ellard for career NFL receptions. His 10,571 yards receiving is the 24th highest total in NFL history. In reaching the 600 career receptions plateau in 118 games, he tied Herman Moore for the second fewest games needed in NFL history to reach that mark, and he became one of only three players in league history (Moore and Marvin Harrison) to reach 600 receptions in fewer than 120 games. He caught 512 passes in his first 100 games to rank as the fourth most receptions in a player's first 100 games. The other three are: Marvin Harrison (591), Sterling Sharpe (524), and Lionel Taylor (516).

To achieve this production, he has averaged 74.8 catches-per-season over his first nine seasons, and caught a pass in every one of his 135 games played over this span. This accomplishment was the second longest streak among active receivers (Harrison, 139) and the third longest streak to begin a career among all players (Marshall Faulk, 158 and Harrison, 139) at that time. For his career, Johnson recorded 60 or more catches in ten of his eleven NFL seasons. In 2001 and 2002, he became the first player in Buccaneers history to record consecutive 1,000-yard receiving seasons when he registered 1,266 yards in 2001 and 1,098 in 2002. Johnson missed only three of a possible 145 career games – including playoffs – due to injury.

=== Jersey number ===
Arguably, Johnson's biggest legacy in the NFL has been of the league to loosen up its jersey number policy, wearing number 19 throughout his career despite the fact that it generally wasn't permissible during most of his career. Entering his rookie training camp with the Jets, Johnson wore number 19 due to all the 80s numbers at the time being used, but was allowed to keep 19 once the regular season started despite 80s numbers becoming available after the final cut downs. He continued to wear 19 with the Buccaneers despite also having 80s numbers available; the NFL permitted it despite Johnson not also playing a position eligible for number 19 such as quarterback, since it wasn't within the 50–79 range that is reserved for offensive lineman and needed for those positions for eligible receiver-based reasons. Upon Johnson's arrival in Dallas in 2004, the NFL relaxed rules for receivers, and now could wear numbers in the 10–19 range in addition to 80s numbers.

Since Johnson's retirement, the NFL has since greatly expanded what numbers are available to players, with receivers now eligible to wear numbers 0–49 in addition to 80–89.

== Career statistics ==
Legend
	Won the Super Bowl
**Bold**	Career high

=== NFL ===
Year	Team	GP	Receiving						Fumbles	
Year	Team	GP	Rec	Yds	Avg	Lng	TD	FD	Fum	Lost
1996	NYJ	14	63	844	13.4	50	8	42	0	0
1997	NYJ	16	70	963	13.8	39	5	50	0	0
1998	NYJ	16	83	1,131	13.6	41	**10**	60	0	0
1999	NYJ	16	89	1,170	13.1	65	8	57	0	0
2000	TB	16	71	874	12.3	38	8	49	2	2
2001	TB	15	**106**	**1,266**	11.9	47	1	**67**	2	1
2002	TB	16	76	1,088	**14.3**	**76**	5	53	0	0
2003	TB	10	45	600	13.3	39	3	33	0	0
2004	DAL	16	70	981	14.0	39	6	53	1	1
2005	DAL	16	71	839	11.8	34	6	46	**3**	**3**
2006	CAR	16	70	815	11.6	40	4	42	1	1
Career		167	814	10,571	13.0	76	64	552	9	8

=== College ===
Season	Team	GP	Receiving		
Season	Team	GP	Rec	Yds	TD
1994	USC	11	66	1,362	**9**
1995	USC	12	**102**	**1,434**	7
Totals		31	168	2,796	16

== Career highlights ==
NFL

- Super Bowl champion (XXXVII)
- 3× Pro Bowl (1998, 1999, 2001)
- Pro Bowl MVP (1998)

College

- Paul Warfield Trophy (1995)
- Unanimous All-American (1995)
- Third-team All-American (1994)
- Pop Warner Trophy (1995)
- Pac-10 Offensive Player of the Year (1995)
- 2× First-team All-Pac-10 (1994, 1995)

== Analyst on ESPN ==
Johnson was part of the 2007 NFL draft broadcasting team with Chris Berman, Mel Kiper Jr. and Chris Mortensen that aired on ESPN. In 2007, he became an ESPN analyst for Sunday NFL Countdown, and Monday Night Countdown. Within the confines of Sunday NFL Countdown and Monday Night Countdown, Johnson invented a segment called C'mon Man!, which allows each panel member to pick a moment in the last NFL week "revolving around either the play on the field or unprofessional behavior off it" that one might consider, on some level, either inexcusable or downright laughable. Each member verbalizes what their gripe may be, while highlights of the moment that they are illustrating run around it, and then ends with the panel member stating with disdain, "C'mon man!" He has also been an analyst on several ESPN telecasts, including pre-game shows on Sundays and Monday nights, and some radio work as well.

He was also an analyst on the ESPN Who's Now competition. He occasionally hosted Jim Rome Is Burning while Jim Rome was unavailable. On January 23, 2011, Johnson was not on Sunday NFL Countdown for Championship weekend because his mother unexpectedly died. After being briefly let go by ESPN in 2016, he was brought back to appear on SportsCenter, ESPN Radio, and other shows.

On August 17, 2020, Johnson began hosting mornings on "ESPN LA 710" KSPN, replacing "Golic and Wingo". Johnson will be joined by basketball analyst Jay Williams, a former NBA player; and Max Kellerman, with the show being titled "KJM". ESPN says the hosts will discuss the morning's top stories and overnight developments with their own perspective and analysis. Johnson will also regularly appear on "Get Up" and "First Take."

As of June 30, 2023, Johnson is no longer working with ESPN.

== Other ventures ==
Johnson co-founded First Picks Management in 2005 as a vehicle to pursue his business interests in the food service, hotel, and real estate industries as well as venture capital investing. He recruited Harvard Business School MBAs, Glenn, and Clarence Mah, as well as his public relations and marketing agent, Ingrid Roberts, to co-lead the organization. Johnson and his management team partnered with National Football League and National Basketball Association athletes, including Warrick Dunn, Dennis Northcutt, Terence Newman, and Joe Smith in developing First Picks Management, a corporate website.

In November 2008, Johnson was contracted for a weekend TV Series called Keyshawn Johnson: Tackling Design. The show was on A&E in July 2009 and showcases Johnson's knowledge of interior design to help other people redecorate their homes.

In 2012, Johnson starred in Jägermeister's critically acclaimed A Stronger Bond television and digital campaign created by the award-winning advertising agency Mistress. In 2013, Johnson was announced to be a contestant on the 17th season of Dancing with the Stars. He was paired with professional dancer Sharna Burgess. On the show of September 23 he was the first celebrity voted out.

In November 2025 he won the "Football Legends" episode of Celebrity Weakest Link and received $50,000 for charity.

== Personal life ==
He has been married twice. Johnson and Shikiri Hightower were married from 1998 to 2002 and they had two children: Maia and Keyshawn Johnson, Jr. His second wife is Jennifer Conrad, with whom he has three children: London, Shyla, and Vance. Keyshawn Johnson Jr. was a wide receiver at the University of Nebraska. His nephew is former New Orleans Saints wide receiver Michael Thomas.

On March 15, 2021, Johnson announced on his Twitter that his oldest daughter Maia had died at the age of 25.
