= Matt Russell =

American football executive (born 1973)

Philadelphia Eagles
- Title: Senior personnel director/advisor to the general manager

Personal information
- Born: July 5, 1973 (age 53); Tokyo, Japan
- Listed height: 6 ft 2 in (1.88 m)
- Listed weight: 245 lb (111 kg)

Career information
- High school: East (Belleville, Illinois, U.S.)
- College: Colorado
- NFL draft: 1997: 4th round, 130th overall pick

Career history

Playing
- Detroit Lions (1997–1999)

Coaching
- Colorado Buffaloes (2000) Graduate assistant

Operations
- New England Patriots (2001) Pro scout; New England Patriots (2003–2005) Area scout; Philadelphia Eagles (2006–2008); Western region scout (2006-2007); National scout (2008); Denver Broncos (2009–2020); Director of college scouting (2009-2011); Director of player personnel (2012-2019); Vice president of player personnel (2020); Philadelphia Eagles (2022-present) Senior personnel director/advisor to the general manager

Awards and highlights
- As player: PFWA All-Rookie Team (1997); Butkus Award (1996); Consensus All-American (1996); Third-team All-American (1995); First-team All-Big 12 (1996); First-team All-Big Eight (1995); As administrator: 5× Super Bowl champion (XXXVI, XXXVIII, XXXIX, 50, LIX)

Career NFL statistics
- Tackles: 19
- Forced fumbles: 1
- Fumble recoveries: 1
- Stats at Pro Football Reference

Matthew Jason Russell (born July 5, 1973) is an American professional football executive and former player who is the Senior personnel director/advisor to the general manager for the Philadelphia Eagles of the National Football League (NFL). He formerly served as the director of player personnel for the Denver Broncos of the NFL. Russell played as a linebacker in the NFL for a single season. He played college football for the Colorado Buffaloes, earning consensus All-American honors and winning the Butkus Award as the top linebacker in America. He played professionally for the NFL's Detroit Lions from 1997 to 1999.

== Early life ==
Russell was born in Tokyo, Japan. He lived in Germany, England and various parts of the United States as a child. He attended Belleville High School-East in Belleville, Illinois, and played for the Belleville East Lancers high school football team.

== College career ==
Russell attended the University of Colorado Boulder, where he started at linebacker for the Colorado Buffaloes football team from 1993 to 1996. He finished his collegiate career ranked first in school history in unassisted tackles (282) and second in total tackles (446). He received all-conference honors during each of his final two seasons with the Buffaloes. As a senior in 1996, he was recognized as a consensus first-team All-American and won the Butkus Award as the nation's best college linebacker after posting a career-high 137 tackles. He was selected as a member of CU's Athletic Hall of Fame Class of 2012.

== Professional career ==
The Detroit Lions selected Russell in the fourth round (130th pick overall) of the 1997 NFL draft. He played in fourteen regular season games for the Lions in 1997 and earned all-rookie honors along his college teammate Rae Carruth. He was expected to compete for a starting linebacker position with Stephen Boyd following the departure of Pepper Johnson. In 1999, Russell injured his knee during the opening kickoff of the first preseason game against the Atlanta Falcons, and was lost for the season to injured reserve. He had also suffered a season ending knee injury the year before. Knee injuries eventually forced him to retire after the 1999 season.

== Post-playing career ==
Russell spent the 2000 season as a graduate assistant coach for Colorado, helping to instruct the Buffaloes’ linebackers. While a member of the Detroit Lions, Russell befriended Lions scout Tom Dimitroff, who later worked for the Patriots and hired Russell as a scout for the Patriots in December 2000.

=== New England Patriots ===
Russell served as a scout for the club during the 2001 season and worked as an area scout for the team from 2003 to 2005. Russell is credited for persuading Scott Pioli and the New England Patriots to draft Matt Cassel.

=== Philadelphia Eagles ===
Russell was hired by the Eagles in 2006 as a scout. He spent the 2008 season as the national scout for the Eagles after scouting the Western region for the club from 2006 to 2007.

=== Denver Broncos ===
Russell was hired by the Broncos in 2009 as Director of College Scouting, and was promoted to Director of Player Personnel in January 2012. As director of player personnel, Russell is responsible for overseeing the day-to-day operations of the pro personnel and college scouting departments for the Broncos. Since his ascension to director of player personnel in 2012, the Broncos overhauled the majority of their roster, developing depth and competition through free agency and the draft. Denver posted the third-most regular-season wins (64) in the NFL from 2012 to 2017, while capturing four AFC West Division titles, two AFC Championships and a victory in Super Bowl 50.

On July 6, 2013, while celebrating his 40th birthday, Russell was arrested for DUI. He was suspended indefinitely without pay by the Broncos, but was reinstated after 60 days. He left the Broncos organization following the 2020 season.

=== Philadelphia Eagles (second stint) ===
On May 11, 2022, Russell was hired by the Philadelphia Eagles to serve as a senior personnel executive in the scouting department.
