= 1995 All-Big Eight Conference football team =

American all-star college football team

The 1995 All-Big Eight Conference football team consists of American football players chosen by various organizations for All-Big Eight Conference teams for the 1995 NCAA Division I-A football season. The selectors for the 1995 season included the Associated Press (AP) and the Big Eight Conference coaches (Coaches). The 1995 team was the final All-Big Eight football team due to the conference's merger in 1996 with four teams from the Southwest Conference to form the Big 12 Conference.

Four teams from the Big Eight Conference finished among the top ten in the final AP Poll of the 1995 season, and players from those teams dominated the All-Big Eight selections. The four ranked teams were:

- The 1995 Nebraska Cornhuskers football team (12–0), led by head coach Tom Osborne, won the national championship and led the conference with 15 players who received first- or second-team honors. Three Nebraska players were consensus first-team selections by both the AP and the Coaches: quarterback Tommie Frazier; defensive tackle Christian Peter; and defensive back Tyrone Williams.
- The 1995 Colorado Buffaloes football team (10–2), led by head coach Rick Neuheisel, was ranked No. 5 in the final AP Poll and had 11 players who received first- or second-team All-Big Eight honors. Four Colorado players were consensus first-team selections: wide receiver Rae Carruth; offensive linemen Chris Naeole and Heath Irwin; and linebacker Matt Russell.
- The 1995 Kansas State Wildcats football team (10–2), led by head coach Bill Snyder, was ranked No. 7 in the final AP Poll and had nine players who received All-Big Eight honors. Defensive lineman Tim Colston and defensive back Chris Canty were consensus first-team selections.
- The 1995 Kansas Jayhawks football team (10–2), led by head coach Glen Mason, was ranked No. 9 in the final AP Poll and had nine players who received All-Big Eight honors. Offensive lineman Chris Banks and defensive back Dorian Brew were consensus first-team selections.

Troy Davis of Iowa State and David Thompson of Oklahoma State were the consensus first-team running backs. Stephen Alexander of Oklahoma was the consensus first-team tight end.

== Offensive selections ==
=== Quarterbacks ===
- Tommie Frazier, Nebraska (AP-1; Coaches-1)
- Matt Miller, Kansas State (AP-2)
- Mark Williams, Kansas (Coaches-2)

=== Running backs ===
- Troy Davis, Iowa State (AP-1; Coaches-1)
- David Thompson, Oklahoma State (AP-1; Coaches-1 [tie])
- Ahman Green, Nebraska (AP-2; Coaches-1 [tie])
- Jerald Moore, Oklahoma (AP-2)
- June Henley, Kansas (Coaches-2)

=== Tight ends ===
- Stephen Alexander, Oklahoma (AP-1; Coaches-1)
- Alonzo Mayes, Oklahoma State (AP-2)
- Matt Lepsis, Colorado (Coaches-2)

=== Wide receivers ===
- Rae Carruth, Colorado (AP-1; Coaches-1)
- Kevin Lockett, Kansas State (AP-1)
- Mitch Running, Kansas State (AP-2; Coaches-2 [tie])
- Phil Savoy, Colorado (AP-2)
- Ashaundai Smith, Kansas (Coaches-2 [tie])
- James Kidd, Colorado (Coaches-2 [tie])

=== Centers ===
- Aaron Graham, Nebraska (AP-1; Coaches-2)
- Bryan Stoltenberg, Colorado (AP-2; Coaches-1)

=== Offensive linemen ===
- Chris Naeole, Colorado (AP-1; Coaches-1 [OG])
- Heath Irwin, Colorado (AP-1; Coaches-1 [tie at OG])
- Chris Banks, Kansas (AP-1; Coaches-1 [tie at OG])
- Aaron Taylor, Nebraska (AP-1; Coaches-2 [OG])
- Chris Dishman, Nebraska (AP-2; Coaches-1 [OT])
- Eric Anderson, Nebraska (Coaches-1 [OT])
- Chris Oltmanns, Kansas State (AP-2; Coaches-2 [OT])
- Tim Kohn, Iowa State (AP-2; Coaches-2 [OT])
- Rod Jones, Kansas (AP-2)

== Defensive selections ==
=== Defensive lineman ===
- Tim Colston, Kansas State (AP-1; Coaches-1)
- Cedric Jones, Oklahoma (AP-1; Coaches-1 [DE])
- Christian Peter, Nebraska (AP-1; Coaches-1)
- Jared Tomich, Nebraska (AP-1; Coaches-2 [tie at DE])
- Kerry Hicks, Colorado (AP-2; Coaches-1)
- Grant Wistrom, Nebraska (AP-2 [LB]; Coaches-1 [DE])
- Steve Martin, Missouri (AP-2; Coaches-2)
- Dirk Ochs, Kansas State (AP-2; Coaches-2 [tie at DE])
- Keith Rogers, Kansas (AP-2 [LB]; Coaches-2 [tie at DE])
- Greg Jones, Colorado (AP-2 [LB]; Coaches-2 [tie at DE]

=== Linebackers ===
- Matt Russell, Colorado (AP-1; Coaches-1 [ILB])
- Percell Gaskins, Kansas State (AP-1; Coaches-2 [ILB])
- Terrell Farley, Nebraska (AP-1; Coaches-2 [ILB]))
- Tyrell Peters, Oklahoma (Coaches-1 [ILB])
- Jason Thoren, Kansas (Coaches-2)

=== Defensive backs ===
- Chris Canty, Kansas State (AP-1; Coaches-1)
- Tyrone Williams, Nebraska (AP-1; Coaches-1)
- Dorian Brew, Kansas (AP-1; Coaches-1)
- Joe Gordon, Kansas State (AP-1; Coaches-2)
- Chuck Marlowe, Kansas State (AP-2; Coaches-1)
- Tony Veland, Nebraska (AP-2; Coaches-2)
- Mike Minter, Nebraska (AP-2; Coaches-2)
- DeMontie Cross, Missouri (Coaches-2)

== Special teams ==
=== Place-kickers ===
- Jeremy Alexander, Oklahoma (AP-1; Coaches-2 [tie])
- Neil Voskeritchian, Colorado (AP-2; Coaches-1)
- Lawson Vaughn, Oklahoma State (Coaches-2 [tie])

=== Punters ===
- Greg Ivy, Oklahoma State (AP-1; Coaches-1)
- Darrin Simmons, Kansas (AP-2; Coaches-2)

=== Return specialists ===
- R. W. McQuarters, Oklahoma State (Coaches-1)
- Reggie Baul, Nebraska (Coaches-2 [tie])
- Ashaundai Smith, Kansas (Coaches-2 [tie])

== Key ==
AP = Associated Press

Coaches = selected by the Big Eight Conference coaches

Bold = Consensus first-team selection of both the Associated Press and Coaches

== See also ==
- 1996 All-Big 12 Conference football team
