= Brandon Sanders =

American football player, coach, and administrator (born 1973)

Arizona Wildcats
- Title: Coordinator of Football Alumni and High School relations

Personal information
- Born: June 10, 1973 (age 53); San Diego, California, U.S.
- Listed height: 5 ft 9 in (1.75 m)
- Listed weight: 185 lb (84 kg)

Career information
- Position: Defensive back
- High school: Helix (La Mesa, California)
- College: Arizona
- NFL draft: 1996: undrafted
- Expansion draft: 1999: 1st round, 34th overall pick

Career history

Playing
- Kansas City Chiefs (1996)*; New York Giants (1997–1998); Cleveland Browns (1999)*; New York Giants (1999); Las Vegas Outlaws (2001); Amsterdam Admirals (2001)
- * Offseason or practice squad member only

Coaching
- Pueblo (2014–2019) Head coach; Tucson Sugar Skulls (IFL) (2019–2021) Defensive backs coach

Operations
- Arizona (2021–present) Coordinator of Football Alumni and High School relations

Awards and highlights
- First-team All-Pac-10 (1995); Second-team All-Pac-10 (1993)
- Stats at Pro Football Reference

Brandon Christopher Sanders (born June 10, 1973) is an American former professional football player who was a defensive back for three seasons with the New York Giants in the National Football League (NFL) from 1997 to 1999. He played college football for the Arizona Wildcats.

Brandon was born in San Diego, California, and attended Helix High School in La Mesa.
