= Bobby La Gesse =

Bobby La Gesse is a sportswriter and editor, currently working for the Ames Tribune in Ames, Iowa. He covers primarily Iowa State Cyclones sports and has been viewed as an authority on the programs by ESPN, Sports Business Daily, The Oklahoman, and NBC Sports.
