= Jonathan Ogden =

American football player (born 1974)

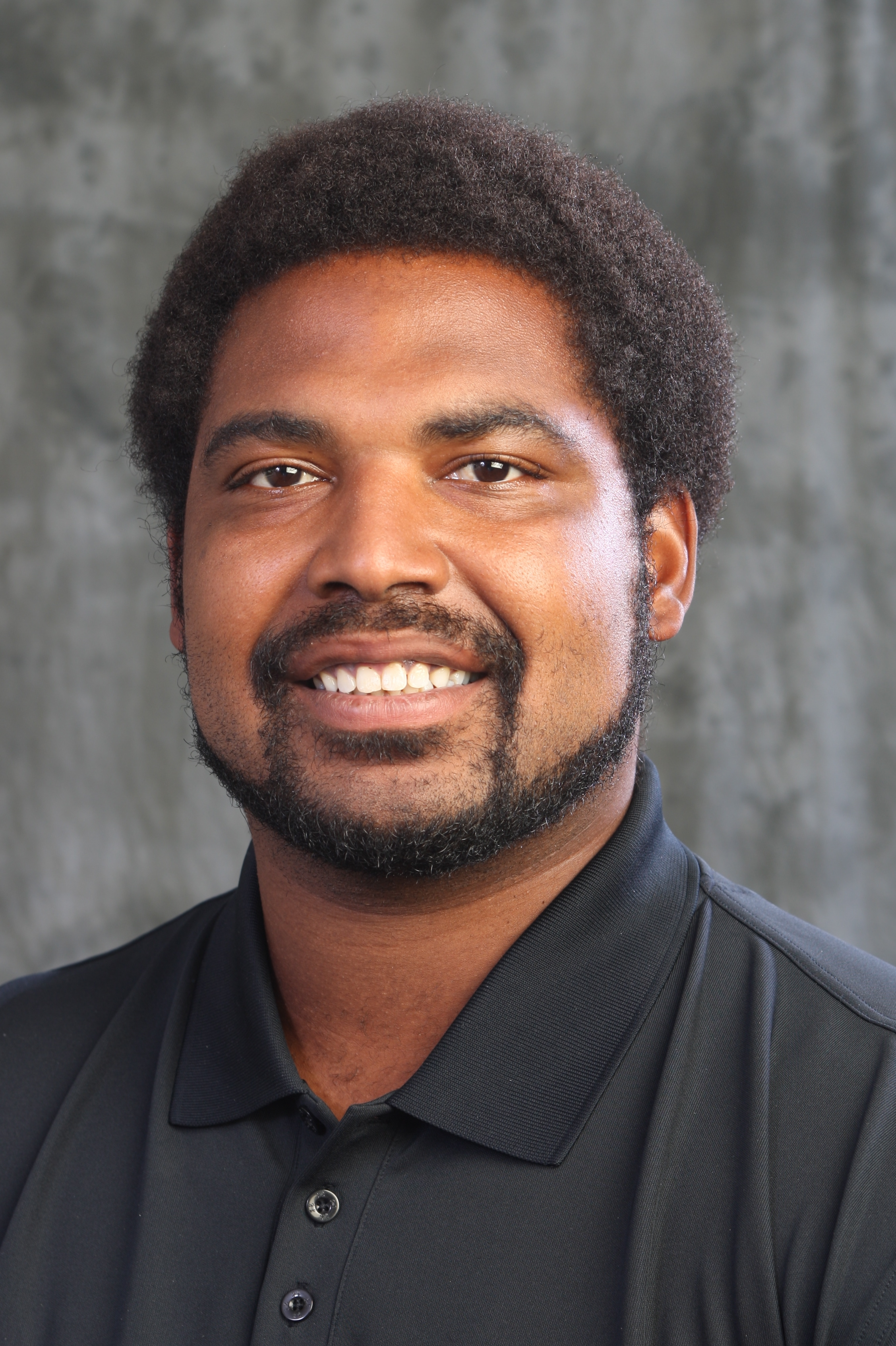
- Ogden in 2008

No. 75
- Position: Offensive tackle

Personal information
- Born: July 31, 1974 (age 52); Washington, D.C., U.S.
- Listed height: 6 ft 9 in (2.06 m)
- Listed weight: 345 lb (156 kg)

Career information
- High school: St. Albans (Washington, D.C.)
- College: UCLA (1992–1995)
- NFL draft: 1996: 1st round, 4th overall pick

Career history
- Baltimore Ravens (1996–2007)

Awards and highlights
- Super Bowl champion (XXXV); 4× First-team All-Pro (1997, 2000, 2002, 2003); 5× Second-team All-Pro (1998, 1999, 2001, 2004, 2006); 11× Pro Bowl (1997–2007); NFL Alumni Offensive Lineman of the Year (2002); NFL 2000s All-Decade Team; NFL 100th Anniversary All-Time Team; PFWA All-Rookie Team (1996); Baltimore Ravens Ring of Honor; Outland Trophy (1995); UPI Lineman of the Year (1995); Jim Parker Award (1995); Morris Trophy (1995); Unanimous All-American (1995); 2× First-team All-Pac-10 (1994, 1995); Second-team AP All-Time All-American (2025); UCLA Bruins No. 79 retired

Career NFL statistics
- Games played: 177
- Games started: 176
- Fumble recoveries: 10
- Stats at Pro Football Reference
- Pro Football Hall of Fame
- College Football Hall of Fame

Jonathan Phillip Ogden (born July 31, 1974) is an American former professional football player who spent his entire career as an offensive tackle with the Baltimore Ravens of the National Football League (NFL). He played college football for the UCLA Bruins, and was recognized as a unanimous All-American. He was selected by the Ravens with the 4th overall pick in the 1996 NFL draft, making him the first Ravens draft selection in franchise history. He was an 11-time Pro Bowl selection and a nine-time All-Pro. A member of the Ravens team that won Super Bowl XXXV, Ogden is widely considered one of the greatest offensive linemen of all time.

On February 2, 2013, Ogden was voted into the Pro Football Hall of Fame, the first inductee to spend his entire playing career as a Raven. He was inducted into the College Football Hall of Fame in 2012, and has been ranked as the #3 best offensive lineman of all-time by Fox Sports.

== Early life ==
Ogden was born in Washington, D.C. He received his education at St. Albans School in Washington, excelling not only in high school football but also in track and field. He was a high school All-American in both football and track. He had high school-best throws of 19.23 meters (63.09 feet) in the shot put and 56.73 meters (186.12 feet) in the discus throw.

== College career ==
Ogden decided to attend the University of California, Los Angeles (UCLA) instead of the University of Florida because the Bruins football coaches would let him participate in track and field. As a sophomore, he helped UCLA to the 1993 Pac-10 Championship and Rose Bowl. He later won the 1996 NCAA Men's Division I Indoor Track and Field Championships in the shot put, with a personal best of 19.42 meters. Ogden had an outstanding career with the Bruins football team, starting as a left tackle for four years. In 23 games during his junior and senior years, he allowed just two sacks. In 1995, Ogden received the Outland Trophy and the Morris Trophy, was the UPI Lineman of the Year, and was a unanimous All-American. Ogden's father, an investment banker, told his son to accept UCLA's decision to move him from right to left tackle.

Ogden's jersey was retired by UCLA, making him only the eighth player in school history to receive that honor. He was inducted into the UCLA Athletics Hall of Fame in 2006. On December 5, 2012, he was enshrined into the College Football Hall of Fame.

== Professional career ==
Pre-draft measurables
Height	Weight	Arm length	Hand span	40-yard dash	10-yard split	20-yard split	Vertical jump	Broad jump	Bench press	Wonderlic
6 ft 8 in (2.03 m)	318 lb (144 kg)	34 1/8 in (0.87 m)	10 5/8 in (0.27 m)	5.12 s	1.80 s	2.98 s	31.0 in (0.79 m)	9 ft 5 in (2.87 m)	30 reps	35
All values from NFL Combine

During the 1996 NFL draft, Ogden was selected by the Baltimore Ravens in the first round with the fourth overall choice, the first draft pick made by the Ravens. Ozzie Newsome wanted to select Ogden but owner Art Modell wanted to select Lawrence Phillips.

He was named a four-time first team All-Pro and an 11-time Pro Bowler at left tackle, earning trips to Hawaii in every season except his rookie year. During his career, Ogden caught two passes – both for one yard and both for touchdowns. He also recovered 10 fumbles and recorded 10 tackles. Ogden also won a reputation for smiling. "He's a laugher," joked former New York Giants DE Michael Strahan. "You see him, you think to yourself this guy is not mean enough to handle the mean guys out there in the NFL. Jonathan would rip your limbs off, and he'd smile...and wave your arm in front of you." He is widely considered one of the best tackles to ever play the game.

In 2001, Ogden won a Super Bowl ring with the Ravens when they defeated the New York Giants 34–7 in Super Bowl XXXV. Ogden announced his retirement on June 12, 2008 after a career that spanned 12 seasons, all with Baltimore. His retirement left Ray Lewis and Matt Stover as the last remaining Ravens from the team's inaugural season in Baltimore. At 6' 9", Ogden was tied with fellow Raven Jared Gaither for the second tallest player in the NFL behind Bengals tackle Dennis Roland at the end of Ogden's playing career.

Ogden served as the Ravens' honorary captain at Super Bowl XLVII, which saw his former team win their second Super Bowl.

== Personal life ==
In 1997, he established the Jonathan Ogden Foundation to help student-athletes take responsibility for their futures through lessons learned on the playing field, in the classroom, and throughout their local communities.

On May 1, 2000, Ogden appeared on WWF Raw along with members of the Baltimore Ravens and attempted to win the WWF Hardcore Championship from Crash Holly after Holly was attacked by Steve Blackman, but was unsuccessful. In September 2009, Ogden was selected to Sporting News' Magazine's Team of the Decade (2000's). In 2010, he was placed 72nd on the list of NFL's top 100 players. He was present during the Ravens' Super Bowl XXXV reunion in 2010.

Ogden has starred in commercials for Apple Ford, a dealership in Columbia, Maryland, and during his playing career, he appeared in TV advertisements for GEBCO, a local car insurance company. He also appeared in a 2012 advertisement with Baltimore Mayor Stephanie Rawlings-Blake in support of Maryland Question 7. The measure expanded gambling in the state.
