= Jake Trotter =

American sportswriter

Jake Trotter is a football writer for ESPN primarily focused on the Cleveland Browns and formerly the Big 12 Conference. He previously worked at The Oklahoman, Austin American-Statesman, and Middletown Journal. Sources: Dallas Morning News, WIBW-TV in Topeka, Kansas, WVOC 560 The Team AM Sports Radio in Columbia, South Carolina, KFOR-TV in Oklahoma City, and The Cincinnati Enquirer.

== Books ==
- Trotter, Jake (2012). I love Oklahoma / I hate Texas. Chicago: Triumph Books. ISBN 9781600785696.
