= Chris Canty (defensive back) =

American football player (born 1976)

No. 26, 35
- Position: Cornerback

Personal information
- Born: March 30, 1976 (age 50); Long Beach, California, U.S.
- Listed height: 5 ft 9 in (1.75 m)
- Listed weight: 185 lb (84 kg)

Career information
- High school: Eastern Regional (Voorhees Township, New Jersey)
- College: Kansas State
- NFL draft: 1997: 1st round, 29th overall pick

Career history
- New England Patriots (1997–1998); Chicago Bears (1999)*; Seattle Seahawks (1999–2000); New Orleans Saints (2000); Las Vegas Gladiators (2006); Rio Grande Valley Dorados (2006–2008)
- * Offseason or practice squad member only

Awards and highlights
- Unanimous All-American (1996); Consensus All-American (1995); Jack Tatum Trophy (1996); First-team All-Big 12 (1996); First-team All-Big Eight (1995); Second-team All-Big Eight (1994)

Career NFL statistics
- Tackles: 146
- Interceptions: 4
- Fumble recoveries: 2
- Sacks: 3
- Return yards: 549
- Stats at Pro Football Reference

Career AFL statistics
- Tackles: 42
- Passes defended: 7
- Stats at ArenaFan.com

Christopher Shawn Patrick Canty (born March 30, 1976) is an American former professional football player who was a cornerback in the National Football League (NFL) and Arena Football League (AFL). He played college football for Kansas State University, and was a two-time All-American. A first-round pick in the 1997 NFL draft, he played professionally for the New England Patriots, Seattle Seahawks, and New Orleans Saints of the NFL, and Las Vegas Gladiators and Rio Grande Valley Dorados of the Arena League.

== Early life ==
Canty was born in Long Beach, California. He attended Eastern Regional High School in Voorhees Township, New Jersey, and played for the Eastern Vikings high school football team.

== College career ==
Canty attended Kansas State University, where he played for the Kansas State Wildcats football team from 1994 to 1996. He was recognized as a consensus first-team All-American as a sophomore in 1995 and junior in 1996 and won the Jack Tatum Award as a junior. He decided to forgo his final season of college eligibility and entered the NFL draft.

== Professional career ==
Pre-draft measurables
Height	Weight	Arm length	Hand span
5 ft 9 5/8 in (1.77 m)	194 lb (88 kg)	30 3/4 in (0.78 m)	9 1/2 in (0.24 m)
All values from NFL Combine

The New England Patriots selected Canty with the twenty-ninth overall pick in the first round of the 1997 NFL draft. Over four NFL seasons, he played for the Patriots as well as the New Orleans Saints and Seattle Seahawks. In 58 career games for those three NFL teams, he had four interceptions and 126 tackles.

He finished his pro career playing for the Las Vegas Gladiators of the Arena Football League and the Rio Grande Valley Dorados of af2.

== See also ==
- List of Arena Football League and National Football League players

== External sources ==
- AFL article
