= American Board of Pain Medicine =

The Specialty of Pain Model, created by the American Board of Pain Medicine

The American Board of Pain Medicine (ABPM) was founded in 1991 as the "American College of Pain Medicine". The name was changed in 1994 to be more congruent with the nomenclature of other medical specialty boards. The mission of the American Board of Pain Medicine is to improve the quality of pain medicine.

== Goals and objectives ==
=== Goals ===
The following is a list of goals:

1. Evaluate candidates who voluntarily appear for examination, and certify or recertify as "Diplomates in Pain Medicine" those who are qualified
2. Maintain and improve the quality of graduate medical education in the field of pain medicine by collaborating with related organizations
3. Provide information about the specialty of pain medicine to the public.

=== Objectives ===
The following is a list of objectives:

1. Determine whether applicants have received adequate preparation in accordance with educational standards established by the ABPM
2. Create, maintain and administer comprehensive examinations in order to evaluate the knowledge and experience of such candidates
3. Issue certificates to those candidates found qualified
4. Develop standards and requirements for graduate medical education in pain medicine in collaboration with other concerned organizations and agencies
5. Serve as a central registry for public information about the certification status of physicians certified as "Diplomates of the American Board of Pain Medicine"
6. Provide information to the public and concerned entities about the rationale for certification in pain medicine
7. Facilitate discussion with the public, professional organizations, healthcare agencies, and regulatory bodies regarding education, evaluation and certification of pain medicine specialists.

== Examination ==
ABPM administers a psychometrically-developed and practice-related examination in the field of pain medicine to applicants who have met requirements for qualification. Physicians who have successfully completed the ABPM credentialing process and examination are issued certificates as specialists in the field of pain medicine and designated as "Diplomates of the American Board of Pain Medicine". A list of currently certified ABPM Diplomats is available to medical organizations and other groups for dissemination to the public.

The ABPM is not a recognized board by the American Board of Medical Specialties (ABMS). It allows non-fellowship trained physicians, as well as those who completed unaccredited fellowships to become "board certified" by them. This is in contrast to the certificate issued to those who have completed an American Council of Graduate Medical Education (ACGME) accredited fellowships which has national standards, and are regulated by the ABMS.

== Initiatives ==
Another initiative of ABPM is to develop a full–fledged pain medicine residency training program accredited by the Accreditation Council for Graduate Medical Education.

== Maintenance of Certification program ==
The American Board of Pain Medicine eliminated lifetime certification in 1998. Certificates issued after 1998 expire after 10 years, creating a 10-year recertification cycle. Concurrently, ABPM created the American Board of Pain Medicine MOC (Maintenance of Certification) program.

== Recognition of ABPM certification in California and Florida ==
California and Florida recognize ABPM certification as equivalent to an American Board of Medical Specialties certification for advertising purposes, thereby permitting ABPM diplomates to represent themselves as "Board Certified" in pain medicine.
