= 1970 New Orleans Saints season =

NFL team season

- Owner: John W. Mecom Jr.
- General manager: Vic Schwenk
- Head coach: Tom Fears (1–5–1); J. D. Roberts (1–6)
- Home stadium: Tulane Stadium

Results
- Record: 2–11–1
- Division place: 4th NFC West
- Playoffs: Did not qualify
- Pro Bowlers: None

The 1970 New Orleans Saints season was the team's fourth as a member of the National Football League. After spending their first three seasons in the NFL's Eastern Conference, the Saints moved in 1970 to the West Division of the new National Football Conference. They failed to improve on their previous season's output of 5–9, winning only two games, and failed to qualify for the playoffs for the fourth consecutive season.

Following a 1–5–1 start, head coach Tom Fears was fired by owner John W. Mecom Jr. and replaced by J.D. Roberts, whose first game was a 19–17 victory over the Detroit Lions at Tulane Stadium in which Tom Dempsey set an NFL record with a 63-yard field goal on the final play; it broke the record held by Bert Rechichar of the Baltimore Colts by seven yards, set seventeen years earlier. Dempsey's record was tied by three: Jason Elam (Denver Broncos, 1998), Sebastian Janikowski (Oakland Raiders, 2011), and David Akers (San Francisco 49ers, 2012). It was broken by Matt Prater of the Broncos in 2013, at 64 yards at elevation in Colorado (Prater's record was broken in 2021 by Justin Tucker of the Baltimore Ravens, who kicked a 66-yard game winner vs. the Lions).

The victory over the Lions was last of the season for the Saints, but both victories came over teams in the thick of the NFC playoff race. The other, a 14–10 triumph over the New York Giants in week three, cost the Giants the NFC East division championship. The Lions qualified for the playoffs as the wild card from the NFC, but were nearly forced into a coin toss with the Dallas Cowboys, a situation which was only averted when the Giants lost their season finale to the Los Angeles Rams.

The Saints' 2–11–1 record was the worst in the NFC and gave them the second overall pick in the 1971 NFL draft; they selected quarterback Archie Manning of Mississippi.

== Offseason ==
=== NFL draft ===
1970 New Orleans Saints draft
Round	Pick	Player	Position	College	Notes
1	10	Ken Burrough *	Wide receiver	Texas Southern	
3	62	Clovis Swinney	Defensive tackle	Arkansas State	
4	88	Delles Howell	Defensive back	Grambling	
5	106	Glenn Cannon	Defensive back	Mississippi	
5	126	Steve Ramsey	Quarterback	North Texas State	
6	140	Mel Easley	Defensive back	Oregon State	
7	166	Lon Woodard	Defensive end	San Diego State	
8	192	Larry Estes	Defensive end	Alcorn A&M	
9	218	Jim Otis *	Running back	Ohio State	
10	244	Jim Brumfield	Running back	Indiana State	
11	270	Gary Klahr	Linebacker	Arizona	
12	296	Willie Davenport	Defensive back	Southern	
13	322	Ralph Miller	Tight end	Alabama State	
14	348	Doug Sutherland	Defensive end	Wisconsin-Superior	
15	374	Jim Vest	Defensive end	Washington State	
16	400	Cliff Gaspar	Defensive tackle	Grambling	
17	426	Doug Wyatt	Defensive back	Tulsa	
Made roster * Made at least one Pro Bowl during career

== Personnel ==
=== Staff / Coaches ===
1970 New Orleans Saints staff
Front office: President – John W. Mecom, Jr.; General Manager – Vic Schwenk; Director of Player Personnel – Jack Faulkner; Head coaches: Head Coach – Tom Fears (first 7 games); Head Coach – J. D. Roberts (last 7 games); Offensive coaches: Offensive Backfield – Don Heinrich; Receivers – Billy Ray Barnes; Offensive Line – Brad Ecklund (first 7 games); Offensive Line – Jim Royer (last 7 games)	Defensive coaches: Defensive Line – Ed Khayat; Linebackers – Jerry Smith; Defensive Backfield – Ed Biles

=== Roster ===
1970 New Orleans Saints roster
Quarterbacks (QB): 14 Edd Hargett; 17 Billy Kilmer; 16 Steve Ramsey; Running backs (RB): 32 Tom Barrington; 36 Dick Davis; 33 Don McCall; 35 Jim Otis; 39 Ernie Wheelwright; Wide receivers (WR): 46 Danny Abramowicz; 25 Al Dodd; 47 Bill Dusenbery; 30 Bob Shaw; Tight ends (TE): 83 Dave Parks; 85 Ray Poage	Offensive linemen (OL): 50 Jake Kupp G; 70 Errol Linden T; 75 Mike Richey T; 67 John Shinners G; 73 Jerry Sturm C; 60 Doug Sutherland G; 72 Don Talbert T; 77 Mike Taylor T; 61 Del Williams G/C; Defensive linemen (DL): 84 Larry Estes DE; 89 Dave Long DE; 87 Richard Neal DE; 76 Dave Rowe DT; 79 Clovis Swinney DT; 74 Mike Tilleman DT; 71 Willie Townes DE	Linebackers (LB): 53 Dick Absher MLB; 55 Jackie Burkett OLB; 66 Bill Cody OLB; 59 Wayne Colman OLB; 52 Frank Emanuel MLB; 56 Hap Farber OLB; Defensive backs (DB): 49 Major Hazelton CB; 18 Hugo Hollas SS/FS; 29 Gene Howard CB; 20 Delles Howell CB; 24 Elijah Nevett SS; 21 Joe Scarpati FS; 23 Doug Wyatt CB; Special teams (ST): 19 Tom Dempsey K; 10 Julian Fagan P	Practice squad: -- John Didion LB; -- Paul Seiler T; Reserve: 38 Tony Baker RB (IR); 82 Johnny Brewer LB Retired; 00 Ken Burrough WR (IR); -- Glenn Cannon S (IR); -- Gregg Cureton LB (IR); -- Jim Flanigan LB (IR); -- Gary Klahr LB (IR); 48 Andy Livingston RB (IR); 43 Dicky Lyons S (IR); 57 Mike Morgan LB (IR); -- Mike Rengel DT (IR); -- Lon Woodard DE (IR); Rookies in italics 42 active, 12 reserve, 2 practice squad

== Schedule ==
Week	Date	Opponent	Result	Record	Venue	Attendance
1	September 20	**Atlanta Falcons**	**L** 3–14	0–1	Tulane Stadium	77,042
2	September 27	at Minnesota Vikings	**L** 0–26	0–2	Metropolitan Stadium	47,900
3	October 4	New York Giants	**W** 14–10	1–2	Tulane Stadium	69,126
4	October 11	at St. Louis Cardinals	**L** 17–24	1–3	Busch Memorial Stadium	45,294
5	October 18	at **San Francisco 49ers**	**T** 20–20	1–3–1	Kezar Stadium	39,446
6	October 25	at **Atlanta Falcons**	**L** 14–32	1–4–1	Atlanta Stadium	58,850
7	November 1	**Los Angeles Rams**	**L** 17–30	1–5–1	Tulane Stadium	77,861
8	November 8	Detroit Lions	**W** 19–17	2–5–1	Tulane Stadium	66,910
9	November 15	at Miami Dolphins	**L** 10–21	2–6–1	Miami Orange Bowl	42,866
10	November 22	Denver Broncos	**L** 6–31	2–7–1	Tulane Stadium	66,837
11	November 29	at Cincinnati Bengals	**L** 6–26	2–8–1	Riverfront Stadium	59,342
12	December 6	at **Los Angeles Rams**	**L** 16–34	2–9–1	Los Angeles Memorial Coliseum	66,410
13	December 13	**San Francisco 49ers**	**L** 27–38	2–10–1	Tulane Stadium	61,940
14	December 20	Chicago Bears	**L** 3–24	2–11–1	Tulane Stadium	63,518
Note: Intra-division opponents are in **bold** text.

== Standings ==
NFC West
	W	L	T	PCT	DIV	CONF	PF	PA	STK
San Francisco 49ers	10	3	1	.769	3–2–1	6–3–1	352	267	W3
Los Angeles Rams	9	4	1	.692	4–1–1	7–3–1	325	202	W1
Atlanta Falcons	4	8	2	.333	3–2–1	3–6–2	206	261	L1
New Orleans Saints	2	11	1	.154	0–5–1	2–8–1	172	347	L6

Note: Tie games were not officially counted in the standings until 1972.

== Quotes ==
Al Wester of WWL Radio describes Tom Dempsey's 63-yard field goal against the Detroit Lions.

Here’s the snap. The ball is down. Dempsey's kick is on the way. And...it is good! It’s good! It’s good! The Saints have won! The Saints have won! The stadium is wild. Dempsey is being mobbed. The time has run out, and the Saints have won, 19-17! Dempsey with a 63-yard field goal! The longest field goal in the history of the National League!

Don Criqui describing the same play for CBS:

He's trying a 63-yard field goal. Not only will Tom Dempsey if he hits this one--he has a very slight wind at his back--he'll set a National Football League record, in addition to winning the game. (Dempsey kicks) I don't believe this..."IT'S GOOD! I DON'T BELIEVE IT! THE FIELD GOAL ATTEMPT WAS GOOD FROM 63 YARDS AWAY! It's the incredible! Tulane Stadium has gone wild! A 63-yard field goal!
