= 1969 New Orleans Saints season =

NFL team season

- Owner: John W. Mecom Jr.
- General manager: Vic Schwenk
- Head coach: Tom Fears
- Home stadium: Tulane Stadium

Results
- Record: 5–9
- Division place: 3rd Capitol
- Playoffs: Did not qualify
- Pro Bowlers: RB Andy Livingston; FB Tony Baker; G Jake Kupp; K Tom Dempsey

The 1969 New Orleans Saints season was the team's third as a member of the National Football League. They improved on their previous season's output of 4–9–1, winning five games. The team failed to qualify for the playoffs for the third consecutive season. Tom Dempsey led the team in scoring 99 points and was named to the Pro Bowl.

The 1969 Saints surrendered 7.90 yards per-pass-attempt (including quarterback sacks), an NFL record at the time for the Super Bowl Era, and third all-time as of 2012.

== Offseason ==
=== NFL draft ===
1969 New Orleans Saints draft
| Round | Pick | Player | Position | College | Notes |
| 1 | 17 | John Shinners | Guard | Xavier | |
| 2 | 45 | Richard Neal | Defensive end | Southern | |
| 4 | 85 | Dennis Hale | Defensive back | Minnesota | |
| 4 | 102 | Bob Hudspeth | Tackle | Southern Illinois | |
| 5 | 111 | Tony Kyasky | Defensive back | Syracuse | |
| 5 | 117 | Keith Christensen | Offensive tackle | Kansas | |
| 6 | 138 | Bob Miller | Tight end | USC | |
Made roster

=== Undrafted free agents ===
1969 undrafted free agents of note
| Player | Position | College |
|---|---|---|
| John Erdhaus | Quarterback | Los Angeles State |

== Personnel ==
=== Staff ===
1969 New Orleans Saints staff
| Front office: President – John W. Mecom, Jr.; General manager – Vic Schwenk; Head coaches: Head coach – Tom Fears; Offensive coaches: Offensive Backfield – Don Heinrich; Receivers – Billy Ray Barnes; Offensive Line – Brad Ecklund | Defensive coaches: Chief Defensive – Jack Faulkner; Defensive Line – Ed Khayat; Linebackers – Jerry Smith; Defensive Backfield – Ed Biles |

=== Roster ===
1969 New Orleans Saints roster
| Quarterbacks (QB): 14 Edd Hargett; 17 Billy Kilmer; Running backs (RB): 38 Tony Baker; 32 Tom Barrington; 48 Andy Livingston; 34 Tony Lorick; 28 Don Shy; 39 Ernie Wheelwright; Wide receivers (WR): 46 Danny Abramowicz; 25 Al Dodd; 85 Ray Poage; Tight ends (TE): 84 Jim Hester; 83 Dave Parks | Offensive linemen (OL): 63 Norman Davis G; 78 Jerry Jones T; 50 Jake Kupp G; 70 Errol Linden T; 67 John Shinners G; 73 Jerry Sturm C; 72 Don Talbert T; 61 Del Williams G; Defensive linemen (DL): 81 Doug Atkins DE; 86 Dan Colchico DE; 89 Dave Long DE; 80 Richard Neal DE; 76 Dave Rowe DT; 74 Mike Tilleman DT | Linebackers (LB): 53 Dick Absher MLB; 82 Johnny Brewer OLB; 35 Ted Davis OLB; 30 Leslie Kelley OLB; 57 Mike Morgan OLB; Defensive backs (DB): 16 Bo Burris SS/FS; 29 Gene Howard CB; 24 Elijah Nevett CB; 33 Steve Preece CB/S; 23 Dave Whitsell FS; 47 Marv Woodson SS; Special teams (ST): 44 Ollie Cordill P; 19 Tom Dempsey K | Practice squad: 62 Ross Gwinn G; 87 Tommy Morel WR; 11 Jim Ninowski QB; 77 Mike Taylor T; Reserve: 66 Bill Cody LB (IR); 59 Wayne Colman LB (IR); 3 Billy Gambrell WR (IR); 12 Tom McNeill P (IR); 75 Mike Rengel DT (IR); 51 Bill Saul LB (IR); 27 Bobby Thompson S (IR); Rookies in italics |

== Schedule ==
| Week | Date | Opponent | Result | Record | Venue | Attendance |
|---|---|---|---|---|---|---|
| 1 | September 21 | **Washington Redskins** | **L** 20–26 | 0–1 | Tulane Stadium | 73,147 |
| 2 | September 28 | **Dallas Cowboys** | **L** 17–21 | 0–2 | Tulane Stadium | 79,567 |
| 3 | October 5 | at Los Angeles Rams | **L** 17–36 | 0–3 | Los Angeles Memorial Coliseum | 54,879 |
| 4 | October 12 | Cleveland Browns | **L** 17–27 | 0–4 | Tulane Stadium | 71,274 |
| 5 | October 19 | Baltimore Colts | **L** 10–30 | 0–5 | Tulane Stadium | 80,636 |
| 6 | October 26 | at **Philadelphia Eagles** | **L** 10–13 | 0–6 | Franklin Field | 60,658 |
| 7 | November 2 | at St. Louis Cardinals | **W** 51–42 | 1–6 | Busch Memorial Stadium | 46,718 |
| 8 | November 9 | at **Dallas Cowboys** | **L** 17–33 | 1–7 | Cotton Bowl | 68,282 |
| 9 | November 16 | at New York Giants | **W** 25–24 | 2–7 | Yankee Stadium | 62,927 |
| 10 | November 23 | San Francisco 49ers | **W** 43–38 | 3–7 | Tulane Stadium | 71,448 |
| 11 | November 30 | **Philadelphia Eagles** | **W** 26–17 | 4–7 | Tulane Stadium | 72,805 |
| 12 | December 7 | at Atlanta Falcons | **L** 17–45 | 4–8 | Atlanta Stadium | 57,021 |
| 13 | December 14 | at **Washington Redskins** | **L** 14–17 | 4–9 | RFK Stadium | 50,354 |
| 14 | December 21 | Pittsburgh Steelers | **W** 27–24 | 5–9 | Tulane Stadium | 72,256 |
Note: Intra-division opponents are in **bold** text.

== Standings ==
NFL Capitol
| | W | L | T | PCT | DIV | CONF | PF | PA | STK |
|---|---|---|---|---|---|---|---|---|---|
| Dallas Cowboys | 11 | 2 | 1 | .846 | 6–0 | 9–1 | 369 | 223 | W3 |
| Washington Redskins | 7 | 5 | 2 | .583 | 3–2–1 | 6–3–1 | 307 | 319 | L1 |
| New Orleans Saints | 5 | 9 | 0 | .357 | 1–5 | 4–6 | 311 | 393 | W1 |
| Philadelphia Eagles | 4 | 9 | 1 | .308 | 1–4–1 | 4–5–1 | 279 | 377 | L4 |

Note: Tie games were not officially counted in the standings until 1972.

== Season summary ==
=== Week 10 ===
Week Ten: San Francisco 49ers (2–6–1) at New Orleans Saints (2–7)

| Quarter | 1 | 2 | 3 | 4 | Total |
|---|---|---|---|---|---|
| 49ers | 7 | 14 | 7 | 10 | 38 |
| Saints | 0 | 7 | 21 | 15 | 43 |

at Tulane Stadium, New Orleans, Louisiana

- Date: November 23, 1969
- Game weather: 62 °F (17 °C)
- Game attendance: 71,448
- Pro-Football-Reference.com

Game information

First quarter

- SF – Ken Willard 1-yard run (Momcilo Gavric kick). 49ers 7–0. Drive:

Second quarter

- SF – Dick Witcher 8-yard pass from Doug Cunningham (Momcilo Gavric kick). 49ers 14–0. Drive:
- SF – Ken Willard 1-yard run (Momcilo Gavric kick). 49ers 21–0. Drive:
- NO – Ray Poage 22-yard pass from Billy Kilmer (Tom Dempsey kick). 49ers 21–7. Drive:

Third quarter

- NO – Andy Livingston 12-yard run (Tom Dempsey kick). 49ers 21–14. Drive:
- NO – Danny Abramowicz 49-yard pass from Billy Kilmer (Tom Dempsey kick). Tie 21–21. Drive:
- NO – Danny Abramowicz 13-yard pass from Andy Livingston (Tom Dempsey kick). Saints 28–21. Drive:
- SF – Jimmy Thomas 45-yard pass from John Brodie (Momcilo Gavric kick). Tie 28–28. Drive:

Fourth quarter

- NO – Safety, center snap out of end zone. Saints 30–28.
- NO – Tom Dempsey 17-yard field goal. Saints 33–28. Drive:
- SF – Jimmy Thomas 18-yard pass from John Brodie (Momcilo Gavric kick). 49ers 35–33. Drive:
- NO – Tom Dempsey 43-yard field goal. Saints 36–35. Drive:
- SF – Momcilo Gavric 23-yard field goal. 49ers 38–36. Drive:
- NO – Ernie Wheelwright 3-yard run (Tom Dempsey kick). Saints 43–38. Drive:

Top passers

- SF – John Brodie – 15/24, 290 yards, 2 TD, INT
- NO – Billy Kilmer – 13/24, 235 yards, 2 TD

Top rushers

- SF – Doug Cunningham – 14 rushes, 84 yards
- NO – Andy Livingston – 14 rushes, 83 yards, TD

Top receivers

- SF – Jimmy Thomas – 3 receptions, 106 yards, 2 TD
- NO – Danny Abramowicz – 5 receptions, 113 yards, 2 TD

NFL Films selected this matchup as the Game of the Week.
