= Joe Owens =

American football player (1946–2013)

No. 72, 71
- Position: Defensive end

Personal information
- Born: November 8, 1946; Columbia, Mississippi, U.S.
- Died: June 9, 2013 (aged 66); Columbia, Mississippi, U.S.
- Listed height: 6 ft 2 in (1.88 m)
- Listed weight: 245 lb (111 kg)

Career information
- High school: Jefferson (MS)
- College: Alcorn State
- NFL draft: 1969: 9th round, 215th overall pick

Career history
- San Diego Chargers (1970); New Orleans Saints (1971–1975); Houston Oilers (1976)

Career NFL statistics
- Games played: 87
- Interceptions: 1
- Safeties: 2
- Fumble recoveries: 4
- Stats at Pro Football Reference

Joseph T. Owens (November 8, 1946 – June 9, 2013) was an American professional football defensive end in the National Football League from 1970 to 1976, with 49 quarterback sacks in 87 games. He was drafted by the New Orleans Saints in the 9th round of the 1969 NFL/AFL draft. He played college football at Alcorn State University. He was first-team All-Southwestern Athletic Conference and an NAIA All-American selection as a senior.

== Early life ==
Owens was born on November 8, 1946, in Columbia, Missouri, to Cleveland and Pearlie (Young) Owens. He attended Jefferson High School, where he was a fullback, offensive tackle and defensive tackle on the football team. Owens was all-conference in football. He was also on the school's track and field team, as a long jumper and throwing the shot put.

== College career ==
Owens attended Alcorn Agricultural & Mechanical College (now Alcorn State University). He played from 1965 to 1968 on the school's football team (the Alcorn A&M Braves) in the Southwestern Athletic Conference (SWAC), mostly as a linebacker. He weighed 205 lb (92.9 kg) entering Alcorn and 225 lb (102.1 kg) when he graduated. As a sophomore, in a late-October 1966 game, Owens blocked a punt against Southern University that was recovered and returned for a touchdown, in a 14–14 tie.

As a senior in 1968, Owens played linebacker on an Alcorn A&M Braves team that had a 9–1 record, and was the SWAC co-champion. That team's defense gave up only 85 total points in ten games, and had three shutouts. Owens had over 10 quarterback sacks, blocked three punts and recovered two fumbles during the season; and was considered both an excellent pass rusher and pass coverage defender. He was one of Alcorn's leading players on defense in defeating Florida A&M in the 1968 Orange Blossom Classic, 36–9. Alcorn was considered the Black College (HBCU) national co-champion that year.

Owens was named second-team All-SWAC as a junior in 1967. As a senior, he was named first-team All-SWAC at defensive end, and a District 27 NAIA All-American. He was an honorable mention NAIA All-American, named by the NAIA Football Coaches Association. In 2014, he was named the 36th greatest football player in Alcorn State University's history.

== Professional career ==
The New Orleans Saints selected Owens in the ninth round of the 1969 NFL/AFL draft, 215th overall. Saints' future Hall of Fame defensive end Doug Atkins worked with Owens on pash rushing technique in the Saints' 1969 training camp. The Saints also tried using him as a linebacker in training camp. Saints' defensive line coach Ed Khayat said Owens had "deceptive strength and quickness". The reportedly 6 ft 3 in (1.91 m) 235 lb (106.6 kg) Owens ran the 40–yard dash in 4.8 seconds in training camp, after running 4.6 in college.

Rather than keeping Owens on their roster or seven-man taxi squad in 1969, the Saints decided to send Owens to the minor league Richmond Roadrunners of the Atlantic Coast Football League to develop him as a player. Richmond's head coach was J. D. Roberts. Owens played defensive end with Richmond. During his time playing defensive end in Richmond, among other things, Owens had a safety, and deflected a point after touchdown conversion attempt.

The Saints signed Owens in January 1970. The Saints traded Owens to the San Diego Chargers before the 1970 season, for a draft pick. As a rookie in 1970, he started all 14 games for the Chargers at left defensive end. He had a team-leading 10 or 11 quarterback sacks, and one safety. He also led the Chargers with 55 or 56 tackles. In 1971, the Chargers released Owens before the start of the season.

Within a few days of being released by the Chargers, the Saints signed Owens. The Saints were now coached by J. D. Roberts, who also had been Owens' coach in Richmond. His first start came on October 17 at right defensive end against the Dallas Cowboys, with coach Roberts calling Owens' performance in the game "outstanding". Owens started the next nine games for the Saints at right defensive end, finishing the season with 7.5 sacks and two fumble recoveries. Tom Williams, his replacement at left defensive end with the Chargers, had one sack in 1971.

Owens began the 1972 season as the Saints starting right defensive end in the team's first two games. His pass rush in the season's second game against the Kansas City Chiefs caused future Hall of Fame quarterback Len Dawson to throw an interception. He also sacked Dawson for a 10-yard loss in that game. In the season's third game, Roberts replaced Owens at starting right end with Dave Long. Owens returned as a starter in the season's eighth game, against the Minnesota Vikings, and sacked future Hall of Fame quarterback Fran Tarkenton, who was known for his scrambling ability. A week earlier Owens had a nine-yard sack, playing as a reserve tackle against the Philadelphia Eagles. Overall, he started seven games at right end that season, with eight sacks and one safety. Although only starting one-half of the Saints' games, he led the team in sacks. Owens blocked a field goal attempt in 1972's final regular season game against the Green Bay Packers.

In 1973, Owens was recovering from a knee injury before he could start training camp that year. He started all 14 regular season games for the second time in his career that season. He had eight sacks (second on the team to Billy Newsome's 8.5 sacks) as the Saints starting right defensive end. He also had the only interception of his career, on a bobbled John Hadl pass while playing against the Los Angeles Rams.

Owens started only four games in 1974, but was brought into games as a pass rushing specialist on third down plays where opposing teams were in passing situations; in effect giving the Saints five first string defensive linemen. Owens reportedly had eight, 10 or 10.5 sacks that season and one fumble recovery. He was reportedly either first on the team in sacks, or second on the team in sacks to Bob Pollard (nine) who started 13 games.

In late July 1975, Owens suffered a sprained knee during training camp. He started two of the 14 games in which he appeared in 1975. Owens remained an important part of the Saints' pass rush that season, and had 6.5 sacks and one fumble recovery in 1975. After the 1975 season, the Saints left Owens exposed in the 1976 expansion draft, and he was selected by the Seattle Seahawks.

At the time the Seahawks selected him in March 1976, the 30-year old Owens said he was not surprised that the Saints left him exposed to the draft. Saints' head coach Hank Stram said at the time that Owens had a knee problem, which was a factor in not protecting Owens in the expansion draft.

The Seahawks released Owens in early September 1976, before the season started. The Houston Oilers signed him on November 23. Oilers' head coach Bum Phillips was familiar with Owens, as he had been Owens' defensive coordinator during Owens' rookie season with the San Diego Chargers. Owens appeared in three games for the Oilers, starting one, with one sack for the Oilers. These were the final NFL games of Owens' career. The Oilers released Owens after the 1976 season, and he was signed by the New England Patriots in July 1977; but he left training camp soon after and the Patriots released him before the 1977 season started.

Over a seven year career, he had 49 sacks in 87 games.

== Personal life and death ==
Owens' wife Burtaniel was an evangelist, and the two had been married 43 years at the time of his death. They had two children, Joe Owens Jr. and Derrick Owens, who is a minister. He was a businessman in his hometown of Columbia, Mississippi after his retirement from football.

Owens died on June 9, 2013, in Columbia.
