= City Stadium (Richmond) =

Sports stadium in Virginia, United States

Coordinates: 37.549697°N 77.486781°W

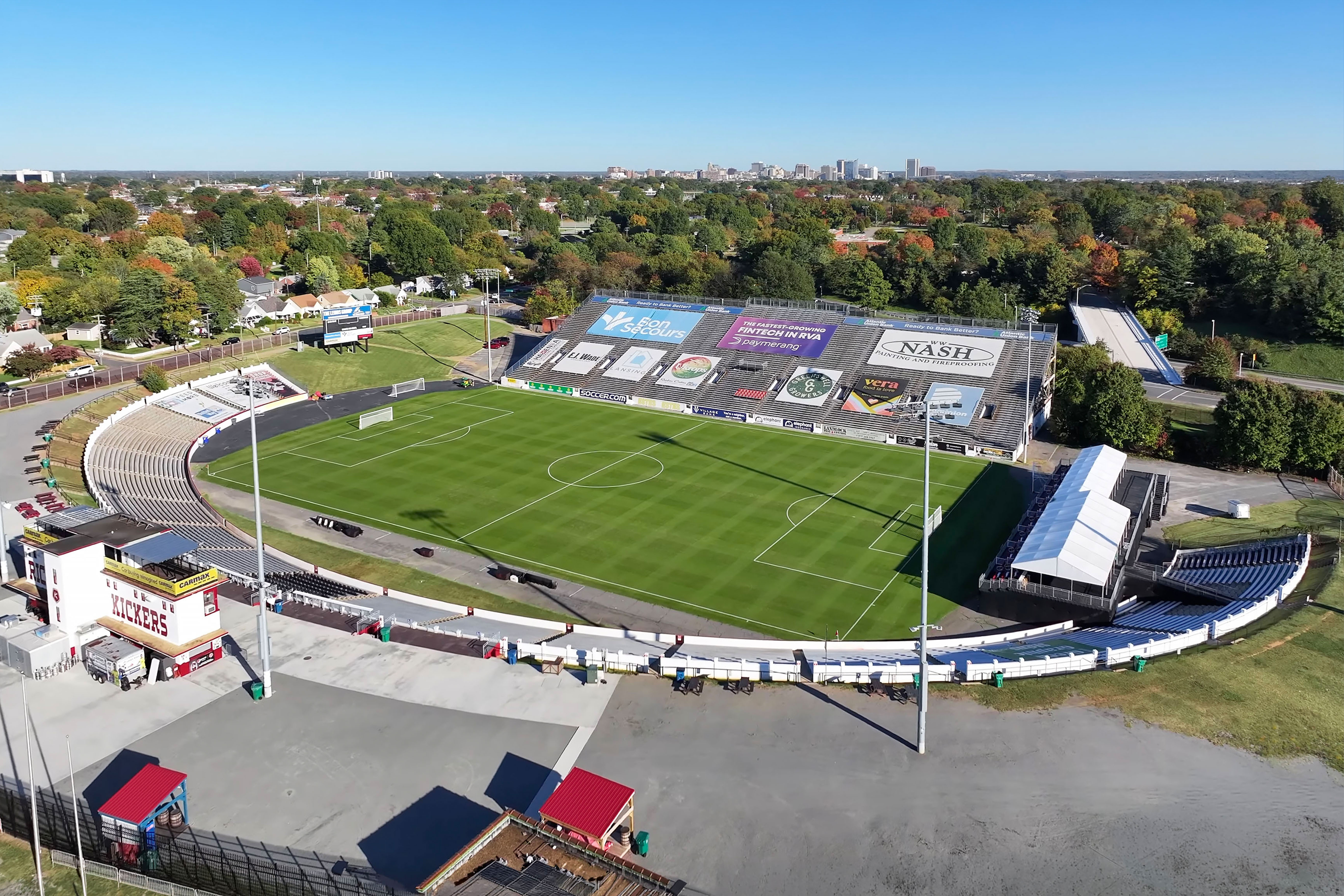
- Aerial view (2023)
- Interactive map of City Stadium
- Former names: City Stadium (1929–1983); University of Richmond Stadium (1983–2010)
- Location: 3201 Maplewood Avenue; Richmond, Virginia 23221; United States
- Owner: City of Richmond
- Capacity: 22,611 (full); 6,000 (Richmond Kickers matches)
- Type: Stadium
- Surface: Patriot Bermuda Grass
- Current use: Soccer
- Public transit: 4

Construction
- Groundbreaking: 1929
- Opened: 1929; 97 years ago
- Cost: $80,000

Tenants
- Soccer: Richmond Kickers (USL1) (1995–present); Richmond Ivy SC (USLW) (2024–present); Richmond Kickers Future (PDL) (2002–2008); Richmond Kickers Destiny (WL) (2004–2009); American football: Richmond Spiders (NCAA) (1929–2009); Richmond Rebels (ACFL/ConFL) (1964–1966); Richmond Mustangs (UAFL) (1967); Richmond Roadrunners (ACFL) (1968–1970)

City Stadium is a stadium in Richmond, Virginia, United States. It is owned by the City of Richmond and is located south of the Carytown district off the Downtown Expressway. The stadium was built in 1929 and seats approximately 22,000 people when both stands are used. It has been used by the Richmond Kickers of USL League One since 1995, at a capacity of 6,000.

The stadium was used by the University of Richmond for American football from 1929 to 2009. The University of Richmond's final home football game at the stadium was played on December 5, 2009, against Appalachian State University in the quarterfinals of the Football Championship Subdivision playoffs.

== Overview ==
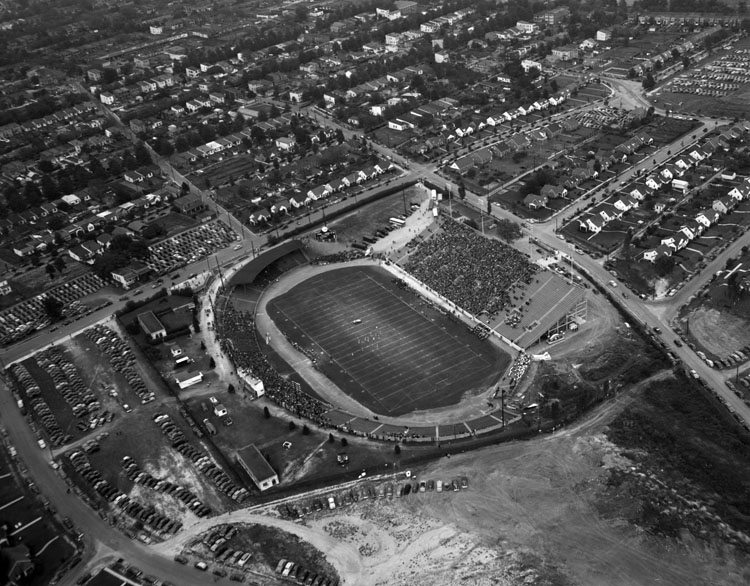
Aerial view of the stadium during a Tobacco Bowl football game in 1949

From 1964 through 1967, the stadium was home to the Richmond Rebels of the Atlantic Coast Football League and the Continental Football League. The Rebels left the Continental Football League in 1967 to become the Richmond Mustangs of the United American Football League.

The stadium then hosted the Richmond Roadrunners of the Atlantic Coast Football League in 1968 and 1969, and their successor, the Richmond Saints, in 1970.

Postseason college football games featuring historically black colleges and universities (HBCUs) were played at the stadium in 1976 (as the Bicentennial Bowl) and during 1977–1980 (as the Gold Bowl).

University of Richmond Stadium served as the site of the NCAA Division I Men's Soccer Championship from 1995 to 1998. The venue broke an attendance record when 21,319 visited the semifinals of the 1995 NCAA Division I Men's Soccer Tournament, with matches between the Virginia Cavaliers and Duke Blue Devils, and the Portland Pilots and Wisconsin Badgers. For a time in the mid-2000s, the stadium also hosted Virginia's high school football state championship games.

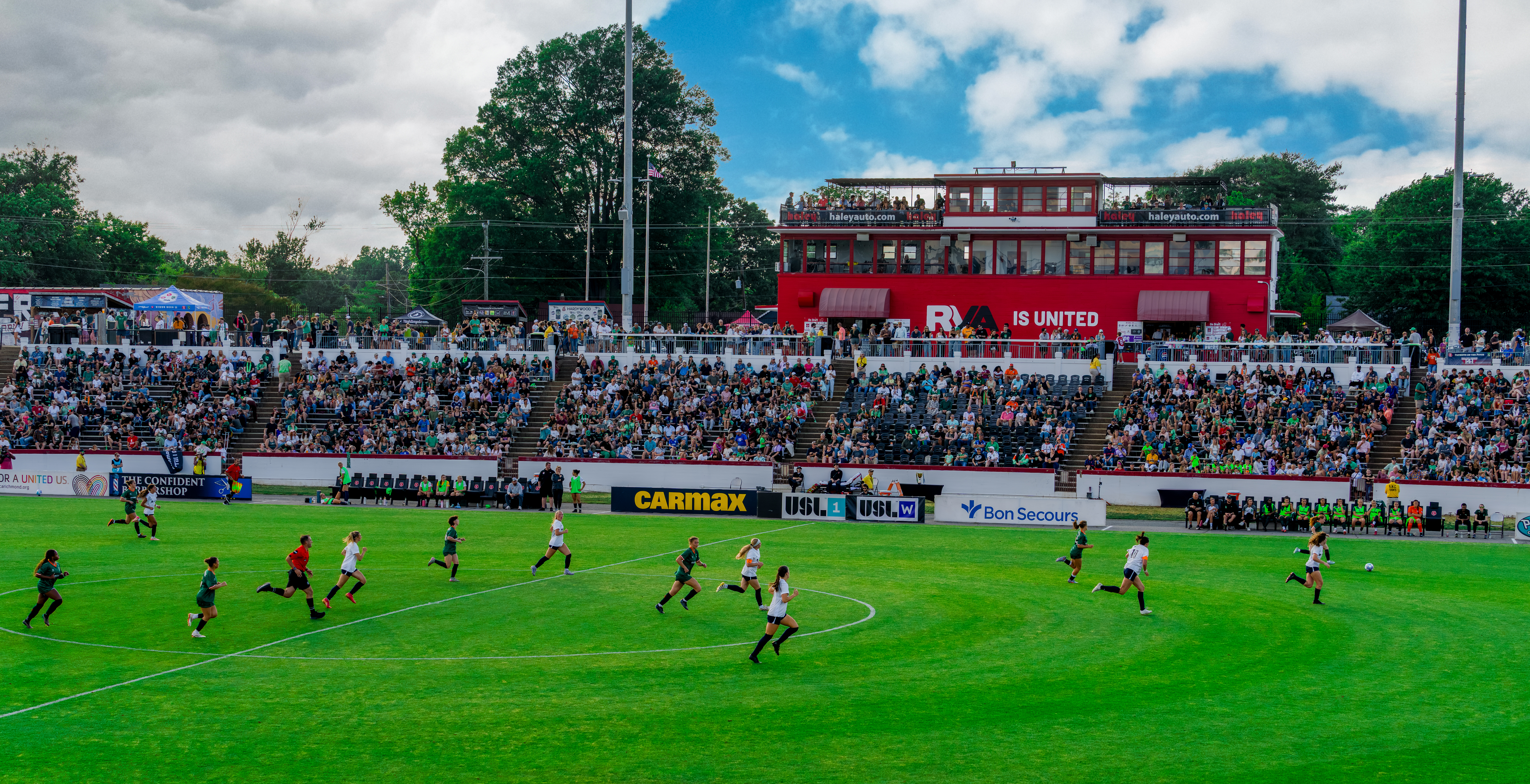
City Stadium during a 2026 soccer match

== Naming ==
The stadium was known as City Stadium until 1983, when it adopted the name University of Richmond Stadium or UR Stadium as part of an agreement, in which the University of Richmond agreed to lease the stadium for $1 per year in exchange for maintaining the facility. The facility's name reverted to City Stadium in 2010 when the University of Richmond ended its tenancy and moved its football games to its new on-campus E. Claiborne Robins Stadium.

== International soccer matches ==
Date	Competition	Team	Result	Team	Attendance
November 10, 1996	1998 FIFA World Cup Qualifying	United States	2–0	Trinidad and Tobago	19,312
June 8, 2003	Friendly	United States	2–1	New Zealand	9,116

Preceded by Richardson Stadium	Host of the College Cup; 1995–1998	Succeeded by Ericsson Stadium
