= United American Football League =

- Sport: American football
- First season: 1967
- Folded: 1967
- No. of teams: 5
- Country: United States
- Last champion: Richmond Mustangs

The United American Football League (UAFL) (also referred as United American Professional Football League (UAPFL)) was a professional American football minor league that played in 1967. The league was an attempt by Hal Shapiro to revive professional football in Richmond, Virginia after the Richmond Rebels from the Continental Football League had folded.

The league featured five teams, but best team in the league was Shapiro's Richmond Mustangs, while the other teams talent-level was closer to a semi-pro squads. Although the Mustangs and Knoxville Bears drew good crowds, the league folded after only one year with large debts to the players.

The UAFL was featured in a short segment in CBS by Heywood Hale Broun.

== History ==
The UAFL was formed in 1967 by Hal Shapiro in attempt to revive professional football in Richmond, Virginia after the last incarnation of the Richmond Rebels had folded in 1966. Shapiro build a team from local football stars, called them "Mustangs" and appointed former Washington Redskins running back Dick James as the head coach. The league teams were hastily put together, with local players which resembled more of sandlot or semi-pro football than a professional. Richmond and Knoxville were able to attract good crowds, but the other teams in the league had trouble to attract spectators, especially the Georgia Raiders from Marietta, GA who attracted only 100 fans to a their home games.

Richmond beat the other opponents by blowout fashion, but decided to run the score against Savannah Indians, because one of their players spit in on one of the Mustangs players, finishing with a 105-0 win. After the game the Indians decided to drop out the league and played the rest of the season (and onward) in the South Carolina Semi-Pro Football League.

After the season the Mustangs changed it name to the "Richmond Roadrunners", and continue playing three more independent games under new management, and later joined the Atlantic Coast Football League for the 1968 season.

=== Standings ===
The Richmond Mustangs were considered "Champions" after finishing the season undefeated.

Team	W	L	T	Pct.
Richmond Mustangs	7	0	0	1.000
Knoxville Bears	4	3	0	.571
Savannah Indians	1	1	0	.500
Georgia Raiders	1	4	0	.200
Chattanooga Redskins	0	5	0	.000

== See also ==
- Continental Football League
- Atlantic Coast Football League
