= Bill Cottrell =

American football player (1944–2025)

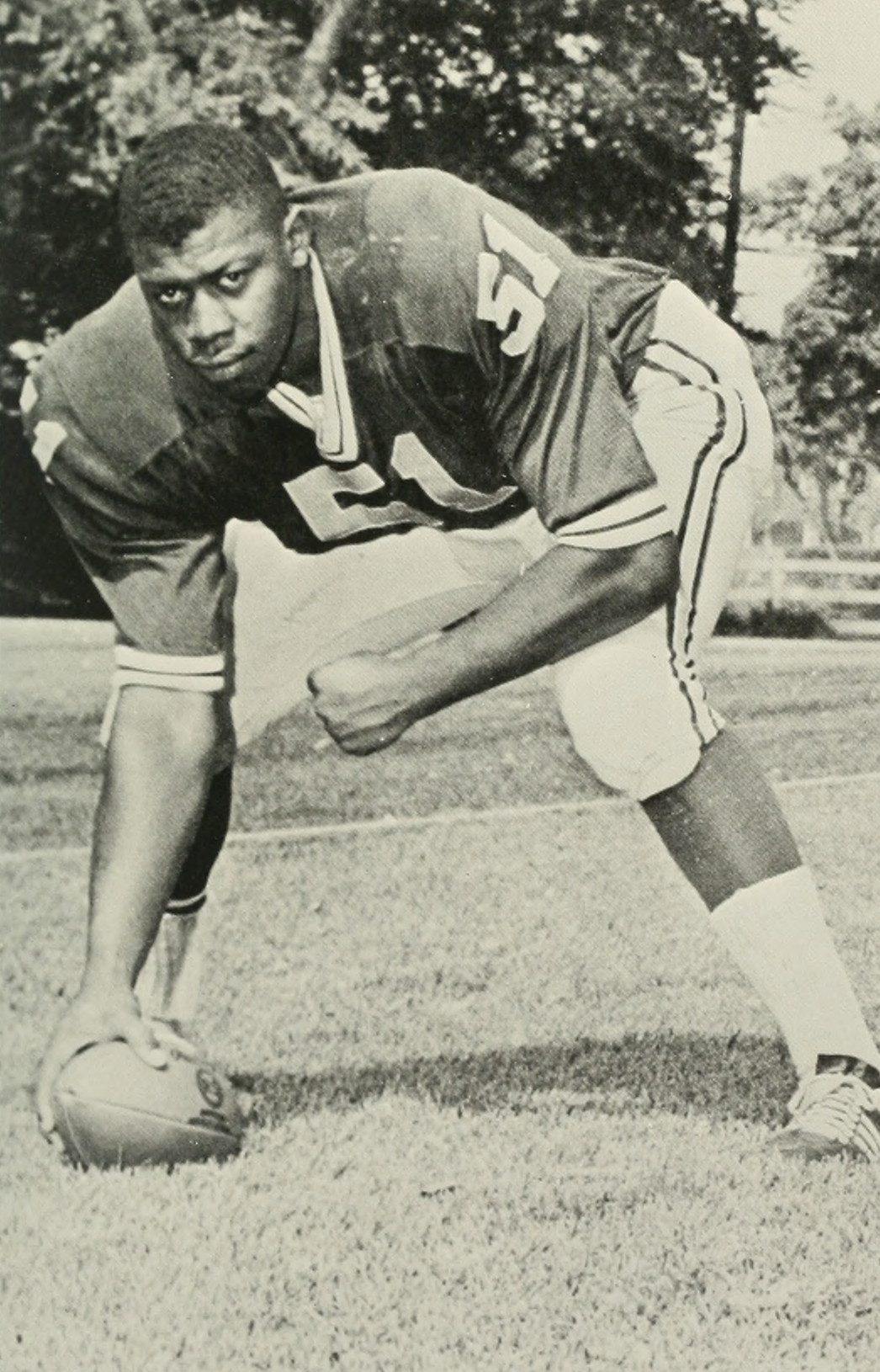
- Cottrell in 1966

No. 70, 52, 66
- Positions: Tackle; guard; center

Personal information
- Born: September 18, 1944; Chester, Pennsylvania, U.S.
- Died: March 20, 2025 (aged 80)
- Listed height: 6 ft 4 in (1.93 m)
- Listed weight: 255 lb (116 kg)

Career information
- High school: Chester
- College: Delaware Valley (1962–1965)

Career history
- Detroit Lions (1966–1971); → Richmond Rebels (1966); Denver Broncos (1972)

Career statistics
- Games played: 63
- Games started: 10
- Stats at Pro Football Reference

William Henry Cottrell (September 18, 1944 – March 20, 2025) was an American professional football player. He was an offensive lineman for five seasons in the National Football League (NFL) for the Detroit Lions and Denver Broncos. He played college football for the Delaware Valley Aggies and signed with the Lions as an undrafted free agent in 1966. After a season with the Richmond Rebels of the Continental Football League, he played for the Lions from 1967 to 1970, later joining the Denver Broncos for the 1972 season. He appeared in a total of 63 games in the NFL and was the league's first black center.

== Early life ==
Cottrell was born on September 18, 1944, in Chester, Pennsylvania. He had four sisters and two brothers, including Ted, who also played professional football. He attended Chester High School where he played football as a lineman, but was an "unheralded" player due to the Chester football team's poor records. He played in the midst of Chester posting a 32-game losing streak, and as a senior, when Chester went 0–9, Cottrell was only named honorable mention all-county. After high school, he attended Delaware Valley College.

== College career ==
Cottrell attended Delaware Valley from 1962 to 1965, playing for the Aggies football team in his last three years. He was a top player at Delaware Valley, a small school, and "played just about every line position" in his time there. He played with his brother for the Aggies and, as a senior, was selected both the team's most valuable player and most inspirational player. He was the team captain in football and also competed in track and field, being captain of the track team as well. Specializing in the shot put, he set the school record and broke it several times, finishing with a mark of 49 ft, 10 and 1/2 inches (15.2 m). At Delaware Valley, Cottrell was noted for his size (standing at 6 feet 3 inches [1.91 m] and weighing 266 pounds [121 kg]) but also impressed with his speed; a coach said that Cottrell had been timed at 10.3–10.5 seconds in the 100-yard dash and 5.7 in the 50-yard dash.

== Professional career ==
Cottrell received interest from both the Detroit Lions of the National Football League (NFL) and the New York Jets of the American Football League (AFL). One BLESTO scout described him as "one of the best linemen I've seen this year". He was not selected in the 1966 NFL draft, but afterwards signed with the Lions as an undrafted free agent. He played with the team in preseason but was released before the regular season and sent to the Richmond Rebels of the Continental Football League. Cottrell explained that "They told me the problem was that I'd come from a small school and the biggest men I ever faced were only 225 pounds. In the big leagues, the guys you face are not only much bigger, but a lot quicker and smarter." He appeared in 11 of 14 games for the Rebels in the 1966 season, as the team compiled a record of 4–10.

After the 1966 season, Cottrell trained with Bob Brown and Lane Howell of the Philadelphia Eagles. He returned to the Lions camp in 1967 and made the final roster, starting out as a backup and special teams player. He became the first NFL player from Chester High School as well as the first from Delaware Valley College. He and his brother remain the only two alumni of Delaware Valley College to play in the NFL. He recalled often staying at the team's facilities that year for an hour after practice, practicing alone or watching film of opponents. He had made the team at center, but in the second game of the season was thrust into the starting lineup at tackle. He ended up appearing in all 14 games for the Lions in 1967, 10 as a starter, with the team compiling a record of 5–7–2.

In 1968, Cottrell appeared in the film Paper Lion, based on George Plimpton's tryout with the Lions. He returned in 1968 and appeared in all 14 games as a center, none as a starter. He was mainly used on special teams in 1969 and helped the Lions to a 9–4–1 record and a second-place conference finish. He played in 10 games as a backup in 1970, missing some time due to injury. He was on injured reserve during the 1971 season and then was released in 1972. After being released by the Lions, he signed with the Denver Broncos in September 1972. He played in 11 games for the Broncos and did not return in 1973, ending his football career. He had signed a three-year contract with the Broncos, but at the end of his first season with them decided to retire from the sport to spend more time with his family.

Cottrell finished his career having appeared in 63 NFL games, 10 as a starter. He holds the distinction of having been the NFL's first black center. Jim Acho, an NFL Alumni attorney, told the Detroit Free Press:

In the 1960s in pro football, the positions up the middle – quarterback, center and middle linebacker – were reserved for white players because they were 'thinking man's' positions. It wasn't until Bill Cottrell, who was extremely smart, that it was thought that black players could play center. He was the first.

== Later life and death ==
Cottrell was a member of the Fellowship of Christian Athletes and, during his career with the Lions, helped organize chapel services. He had started working for Chrysler in labor relations during his football career, and in 1973 left to work for Ford Motor Company, becoming a personnel supervisor at Ford's Woodhaven Stamping Plant. He was married to Urline Cottrel, and had a son and a daughter. Cottrell died on March 20, 2025, at the age of 80.

== See also ==
- Black players in professional American football
