= Rich Jackson =

American football player (born 1941)

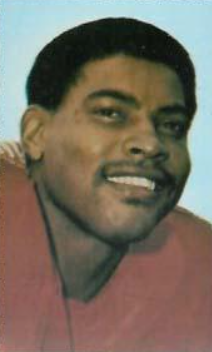
- Jackson in 1969

No. 32, 87
- Positions: Defensive end, linebacker

Personal information
- Born: July 22, 1941 (age 85); New Orleans, Louisiana, U.S.
- Listed height: 6 ft 3 in (1.91 m)
- Listed weight: 255 lb (116 kg)

Career information
- High school: L.B. Landry (New Orleans)
- College: Southern
- NFL draft: 1966: undrafted

Career history
- Oakland Raiders (1966); Denver Broncos (1967–1972); Cleveland Browns (1972)

Awards and highlights
- 3× First-team All-Pro (1968, 1969, 1970); 3× Pro Bowl (1968, 1969, 1970); AFL All-Time second-team; Denver Broncos Ring of Fame

Career NFL statistics
- Sacks: 45
- Fumbles recovered: 2
- Games played: 82
- Stats at Pro Football Reference

Richard Samuel Jackson (born July 22, 1941), nicknamed "Tombstone", is an American former professional football player who was a defensive end and a linebacker in the American Football League (AFL) and National Football League (NFL). He played college football for the Southern Jaguars. Jackson played for the AFL's Oakland Raiders in 1966 and Denver Broncos from 1967 through 1969, remaining with the Broncos in 1970 through 1971 after their post-merger transition to the NFL, and the Cleveland Browns in 1972. Jackson was named an All-Pro in 1969 and 1970.

== Early life and college ==
Jackson was born in New Orleans, Louisiana on July 22, 1941. His father died when he was four, and Jackson was raised by his mother Katherine. He grew up in a rough area in Algiers, New Orleans and attended L.B. Landry High School where he played football for legendary coach Felix James. In 1959, Jackson led Landry to a state championship in football, with a record of 10–0–1.

He showed outstanding skills and determination as a 210-pound defensive end and also ended up running track when one of the school's sprinters beat him in a 100-yard foot race. He spent the entire school year working on his speed. When track season came around, Jackson bested that sprinter in a rematch and earned a spot on the track team. He threw the discus, javelin and shot, as well as anchoring relay teams and running the 220-yard dash. In one March 1960 track meet, he came in first in shotput, second in discus, and fourth in the 220-yard dash. Jackson was first or second in shot put and discus multiple times later in the track season that year.

Jackson saw football as a means to a college education, with his greatest athletic passion being track and field.

== College ==
Upon graduating from Landry, Jackson was offered a football scholarship at Southern University in nearby Baton Rouge, and attended Southern. In college, he was a standout end on both sides of the ball, and also played linebacker; starting all four years. As a freshman he started at outside linebacker, and on offense played split end, tight end, and flanker.

He also lettered in track and won the NAIA Shotput competition in 1962. His 58 ft 1 in (17.7 m) heave in 1964 was a Louisiana collegiate record, which has been reported to be a standing record at least as of 2019. (Louisiana universities such as LSU and University of Louisiana at Lafayette have since had shotput record holders at greater distances.) As a track star, Jackson won seven Southwestern Athletic Conference championships, four in discus and three in shotput.

Future NFL player Alvin Haymond was Jackon's teammate at both Landry and Southern.

Jackson eventually earned a master's degree at Southern.

== Professional career ==
=== Oakland Raiders ===
After college, Jackson went undrafted and signed with the AFL Oakland Raiders as a free agent in 1965. He did not play in 1965, but came back to the Raiders in 1966, playing in five games at linebacker in his rookie season. He did not start in any games, playing mostly on special teams.

The Broncos acquired him at the beginning of training camp in 1967 when Broncos head coach Lou Saban sent All-Pro wide receiver Lionel Taylor and Jerry Strum to the Raiders in exchange for Jackson, Dick Tyson and Ray Schmautz. Taylor's All-Pro days were behind him, however, and he never played for Oakland after being waived; finishing out his final two years playing sparingly for the Houston Oilers.

=== Denver Broncos ===
The Broncos switched him to defensive end and Jackson showed the quickness that was to become his trademark in professional football. He played for the AFL Denver Broncos from 1967 through 1969, with 10 sacks, or 10.5 sacks, in 1968 and a career high 11, or 12.5, in 1969. Jackson racked up another 10 Sacks in 1970 as the AFL and NFL merged. Though typically double and triple teamed by opposing blockers, he believes he had more sacks than have been unofficially estimated. Jackson was the first Bronco to be named to the All-NFL first-team in 1970 and was a starter in the Pro Bowl that year. By all reckoning, he started 52 of 67 games in 5.5 years with the Broncos from 1967-72.

During his time in the NFL, Jackson's nickname was "Tombstone," and he became famous for moves such as the "head slap" and the "halo spinner" which he used to subdue opposing offensive linemen. In Lyle Alzado's book "Mile High" he recalled Jackson as the toughest man he had ever met, and told the story of Jackson breaking the helmet of Green Bay Packers offensive tackle Bill Hayhoe with a head slap.

Alzado says Hayhoe had been tormenting a then-rookie Alzado, and Jackson, as the team's enforcer moved into Alzado's spot to face the Packer lineman. He split the man's helmet, drove him to his knees with a bloodied face, leaving Hayhoe to be helped off the field. On the other hand, the Wisconsin press reported of the September 1971 game that Hayhoe held his own blocking against Jackson in the game, describing Jackson as at least the same level of player as Deacon Jones or Carl Eller.

Jackson recorded 10 sacks in both 1968 and 1970 and posted a career-high total of 11 in 1969. It has also been reported he had 10.5 sacks in 1968, 12.5 in 1969, and ten in 1970. He was named First-Team All-AFL by the Associated Press (AP), Pro Football Weekly, and United Press International (UPI) at the conclusion of the 1968 season, and by the AP, Newspaper Enterprise Association (NEA), New York Daily News, Pro Football Weekly, The Sporting News, and UPI at the end of the 1969 season. He was also a unanimous First-Team All-NFL choice in 1970. He played in the AFL All-Star game in 1968 and 1969, and the NFL Pro Bowl in 1970.

Jackson's career was cut short by a severe knee injury midway through the 1971 season in a game against the Philadelphia Eagles. He came back in 1972, but his abilities were considerably diminished. The Broncos traded him to the Cleveland Browns after four games, and he played the remaining ten games of his career in Cleveland. He had two sacks for each team that year. The Browns were defeated by the eventual Super Bowl champion Miami Dolphins in the playoffs, the only playoff game in which Jackson ever appeared. He retired before the start of the 1973 season.

== Legacy ==
He finished with an unofficial total of 43 sacks or 45 sacks, 31 or 33 of which came during the three-season period of 1968 to 1970. Hall of Fame quarterback Len Dawson said that when he thinks of Jackson, he thinks of pain. Despite the shortened career, Sports Illustrated's football expert, Paul Zimmerman, said that Tombstone Jackson was perhaps the finest overall defensive end and pass rusher he ever saw, a surefire Hall of Famer if he would have had a longer playing career, in a bigger media market. Zimmerman grouped Jackson with all-time great Deacon Jones at defensive end, having the highest level of competitiveness and athleticism.

Contrary to popular belief that Deacon Jones created the head slap, Jackson claims he was the first to develop the head slap, a maneuver used by defensive linemen to disorient offensive linemen with an initial open-handed blow to the helmeted head of the offensive player. Jackson called it the "halo spinner". He also used a double head slap and head butt. A rule was imposed to forbid the head slap in 1977. Jones, whose autobiography is entitled Headslap, himself admitted he did not invent the head slap, which may have originated with his Los Angeles Rams teammate Roosevelt Grier, but like Jackson considered himself to have developed and mastered the tactic.

== Honors ==
Jackson wore number 87 with the Broncos and was part of the inaugural class of inductees into the Denver Broncos' "Ring of Fame". He was inducted in 1984 along with safety Goose Gonsoulin, running back Floyd Little, and wide receiver Lionel Taylor. He was voted to the Colorado Sports Hall of Fame in 1975.

In 1988, he was inducted into the Greater New Orleans Sports Hall of Fame. In 1994, he was inducted into the Louisiana Sports Hall of Fame. In 2019, Jackson was inducted into the Black College Football Hall of Fame. He was named to the second team AFL Hall of Fame All-Decade Team for the 1960s.

In 2015, the Professional Football Researchers Association named Jackson to the PRFA Hall of Very Good Class of 2015.

== Personal life ==
After retiring from football, Jackson took a job with Orleans Parish School System as a teacher. He later became an assistant principal. He coached the Kenner Knights of the semi-pro Continental Football league.

He and his wife Katherine have two daughters.

== See also ==
- List of American Football League players
