= John David Roberts =

John David Roberts may refer to:

- J. D. Roberts (1932–2021), American football coach
- John Roberts (journalist) (born 1956), Canadian American television journalist
