= Tom Fears =

American football player and coach (1922–2000)

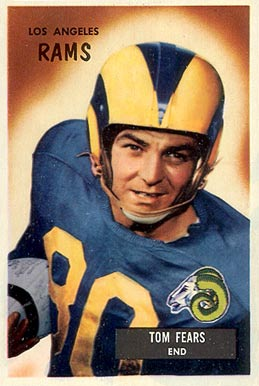
- Fears, c. 1955

No. 55, 80
- Position: End

Personal information
- Born: December 3, 1922; Guadalajara, Mexico
- Died: January 4, 2000 (aged 77); Palm Desert, California, U.S.
- Listed height: 6 ft 2 in (1.88 m)
- Listed weight: 216 lb (98 kg)

Career information
- High school: Manual Arts (Los Angeles, California, U.S.)
- College: Santa Clara (1941-1942); UCLA (1946-1947)
- NFL draft: 1945: 11th round, 103rd overall pick

Career history

Playing
- Los Angeles Rams (1948–1956)

Coaching
- Green Bay Packers (1959) Wide receivers coach; Los Angeles Rams (1960–1961) Wide receivers coach; Green Bay Packers (1962–1965) Offensive ends coach; Atlanta Falcons (1966) Wide receivers coach; New Orleans Saints (1967–1970) Head coach; Philadelphia Eagles (1971–1972) Offensive coordinator; Southern California Sun (1974–1975) Head coach

Operations
- Los Angeles Express (1983–1985) Director of player personnel

Awards and highlights
- 3× NFL champion (1951, 1962, 1965); First-team All-Pro (1950); 3× NFL receptions leader (1948–1950); NFL receiving yards leader (1950); NFL receiving touchdowns co-leader (1949); NFL 1950s All-Decade Team; St. Louis Football Ring of Fame; Second-team All-American (1947); First-team All-PCC (1947); Second-team All-PCC (1946)

Career NFL statistics
- Receptions: 400
- Receiving yards: 5,397
- Receiving touchdowns: 38
- Stats at Pro Football Reference

Head coaching record
- Career: 13–34–2 (.286)
- Coaching profile at Pro Football Reference
- Pro Football Hall of Fame
- College Football Hall of Fame

Thomas Jesse Fears (December 3, 1922 – January 4, 2000) was a Mexican-American professional football player who was a split end for the Los Angeles Rams in the National Football League (NFL), playing nine seasons from 1948 to 1956. He was later an NFL assistant coach and head coach of the New Orleans Saints, and is in the Pro Football Hall of Fame. He played college football for the UCLA Bruins football team and is a member of the College Football Hall of Fame.

== Early life ==
Born in Guadalajara, Mexico, Fears was the son of a Mexican mother, Carmen Valdés, and an American father, mining engineer Charles William Fears. The family moved to Los Angeles when Tom was age six. There, he began to display his ample work ethic by unloading flowers for 25 cents an hour, and later serving as an usher at football games for double that amount.

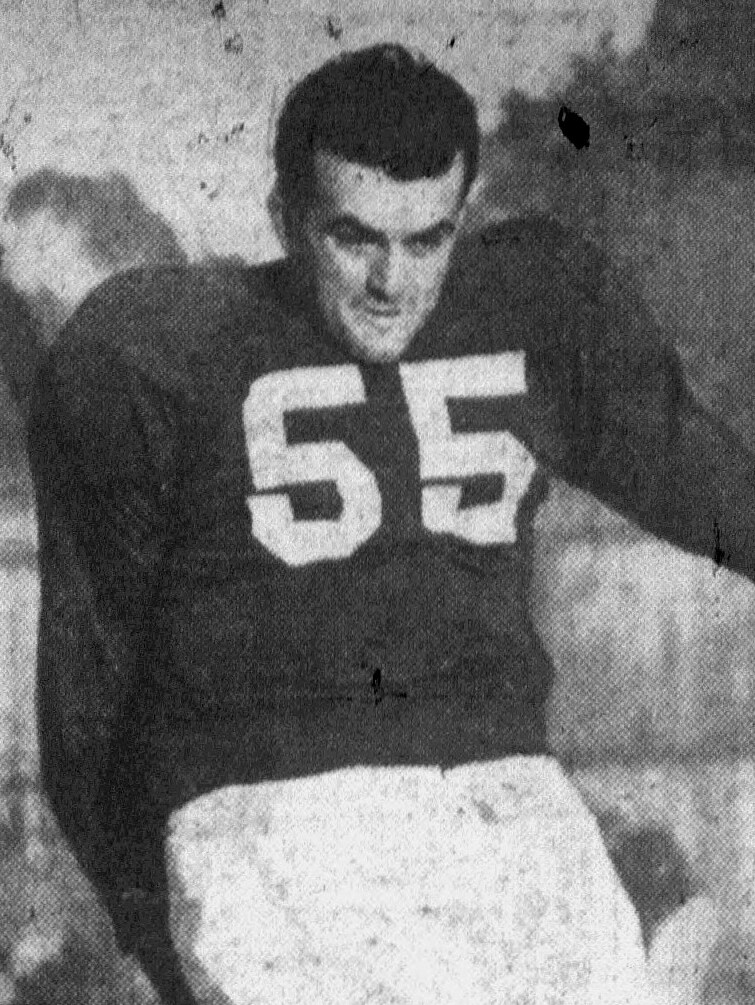
Fears, circa 1947

Fears first played football at Los Angeles's Manual Arts High School, where he met Toby Freedman of Beverly Hills High School. They became longtime friends. Upon graduation, he enrolled at Santa Clara University. He spent one year at the school before being drafted in World War II and spent the next three years in military service. After his father became a Japanese prisoner of war, Fears sought to become a fighter pilot to fight Japan. He became a pilot, but was instead shipped to Colorado Springs to play football for a service team.

Upon his release, he had been drafted by the Rams in 1945, but remained in school and transferred to UCLA, winning All-American honors each of his two seasons at the school. His senior campaign nearly ended in an abrupt fashion in 1947, when he and some Bruin teammates were investigated for posing in local advertisements for a Los Angeles clothing store. When it was determined that Fears and the other players worked for the store, and were not identified as athletes, the matter was dropped.

This job had been one of many provided by school boosters, and included a brief bit as a pilot in the Humphrey Bogart film Action in the North Atlantic. The largesse by such people led Fears to joke that his $6,000 first-year contract and $500 bonus from the Rams meant that he was taking a pay cut.

== Playing career ==
=== Los Angeles Rams ===
Selected as a defensive back by the Los Angeles Rams in the eleventh round (103rd overall) of the 1945 NFL draft. He is distinguished as being the first Mexican-born player to be drafted into the National Football League. Fears quickly made his mark as a wide receiver in 1948, while also displaying his versatility by playing on defense and at split end. During his first three seasons at the professional level, he led all NFL receivers in catches, and broke the league's single-season record with 77 catches in 1949.

The record would be short-lived as he increased that mark to 84 during the 1950 season, including a then-record 18 catches in one game against the Green Bay Packers on November 12. He also helped the team advance to the NFL title game with a trio of touchdown receptions in the divisional playoff against the Chicago Bears, winning All-Pro accolades for the second consecutive year.

During the ensuing offseason, Fears became embroiled in a contract dispute with the team for the second straight year. The year before, he hinted at leaving the team to work for General Motors Corporation, then announced on March 13, 1951, that he was retiring to work for a local liquor distributor. Neither threat materialized, and despite offers from four Canadian Football League teams, Fears signed for $13,000.

That season, Fears played in only seven games, but helped lead the Rams to their third straight championship game appearance. After two disappointments, the franchise captured its first NFL title since moving to the West Coast, with Fears an integral part of the title game victory when he caught the winning score. His 73-yard touchdown reception midway through the fourth quarter broke a 17–17 deadlock with the Cleveland Browns.

After bouncing back in 1952 with 48 receptions for 600 yards and six scores, the beginning of the end of his career began after he fractured two vertebrae in an October 18, 1953 game against the Detroit Lions. Limited to just 23 receptions that year, he averaged 40 catches the next two years, but after a preseason injury in 1956, he hauled in only five passes and retired on November 6. He was a contestant on the national radio program You Bet Your Life hosted by Groucho Marx in an episode that aired on December 7, 1955, and also included calypso singer Sir Lancelot. For the remainder of the 1956 campaign, he served as an assistant coach, finishing his playing days with 400 catches for 5,397 yards and 38 touchdowns.

== Coaching career ==
=== Packers, Rams and Falcons ===
Fears was out of the game for the next two years, but returned briefly as an assistant in the first year of Vince Lombardi's reign with the Packers. Business conflicts back in California caused him to leave the position at midseason, but Fears resumed his coaching career the following year with the Rams under former teammate Bob Waterfield. After two seasons in that role, Fears returned to Green Bay for a four-year stint as an assistant, where he was part of championship teams in 1962 and 1965.

Fears applied for the head-coaching job with the St. Louis Cardinals (football) after the 1965 NFL season, but after not being chosen, he joined fellow Packer assistant Norb Hecker, who had been named head coach of the expansion Atlanta Falcons. In the first game of the 1966 regular season, Fears caused controversy when he accused Rams coach George Allen of attempting to garner inside information on the team from a player who had been cut, charges that were never proven.

=== New Orleans Saints ===
After that 2–12 first season in Atlanta, Fears became a head coach for the first time when he was hired by the expansion New Orleans Saints on January 27, 1967. He was the first Latino head coach in the NFL. Despite the promise of the team scoring on the first-ever kickoff return in franchise history, Fears's nearly four years at the helm of what became a perennial losing franchise were an exercise in frustration.

In 1970, Fears was recognized for his professional playing career when he was elected to the Pro Football Hall of Fame. That March, rumors of Fears replacing the departed Don Shula with the Baltimore Colts surfaced, but the Colts hired Don McCafferty in early April. Issues between Fears and Saints owner John W. Mecom Jr., primarily Fears seeking the additional role of general manager, fueled such speculation. On April 20, the matter ended when he was given control over all player personnel matters, even though general manager Vic Schwenk remained in his role.

Fears's tenure in his new dual roles, however, would be short, when the team ended the first half of the 1970 season with a 1–5–1 record, resulting in his dismissal on November 3 after compiling an overall record of 13–34–2. His last game as coach of the Saints was a 30–17 loss to the team he played for, the Rams, the same team that defeated the Saints in their first game in 1967. J.D. Roberts was hired as Fears's successor, and in his first game, Tom Dempsey kicked an NFL-record 63-yard field goal to give the Saints a 19–17 victory over the Detroit Lions, New Orleans's only other win of 1970.

=== Eagles, WFL and USFL ===
Fears resurfaced in 1971, serving as offensive coordinator of the Philadelphia Eagles, but when head coach Ed Khayat (Fears's defensive line coach in New Orleans) was fired at the end of the 1972 season, Fears was out of work again.

After spending 1973 off the gridiron, Fears was named head coach of the fledgling World Football League's Southern California Sun on January 14, 1974. The fragile financial condition of the entire league resulted in Fears leading the team for less than two years before the WFL folded in October 1975.

Fears's disappointment was soothed somewhat when he was named to the College Football Hall of Fame in 1976, the same year he was named president of the All-Sports Council of Southern California, which helped amateur sports in the area. One year later, he returned to coaching as an assistant at San Bernardino Junior College.

During this period, he was also working as a technical adviser for movies with a football connection, and in 1979, began a football scouting service. The two roles came together in controversial fashion when Fears began working on the production of North Dallas Forty, a film that took a look at the sordid side of the professional game.

At the time Fears had three clients: the Packers, Houston Oilers and Pittsburgh Steelers, but after the movie was released, all three teams dropped his services. Claiming that the NFL had blacklisted him, Fears spoke with league commissioner Pete Rozelle (who had worked for the Rams during Fears's playing days), but never again found work in the league.

Remaining on the fringes of the sport, Fears in 1980 worked as a coach for the Chapman College club football team, then became a part-owner of the Orange Empire Outlaws of the California Football League the following year. In 1982, he was hired as player personnel director of the new United States Football League's Los Angeles Express. Bolstered by huge spending from team owner Bill Daniels, the team reached the conference championship game, but saw financial troubles doom not only the team, but the league as well.

Fears's final position in football came in 1990, when he was named head coach of the Milan franchise in the fledgling International League of American Football. Four years later, he was diagnosed with Alzheimer's disease. He died from complications of the disease at a care home in Palm Desert, California, on January 4, 2000, at the age of 77. At the time of his death, he lived in nearby Palm Springs.

Fears was the first Mexico-born NFL player inducted into the Pro Football Hall of Fame.

== Career statistics ==
=== NFL ===
Legend
	Led the league
	NFL champion
**Bold**	Career best

Year	Team	Games		Receiving					Fum
Year	Team	GP	GS	Rec	Yds	Avg	Lng	TD	Fum
1948	LAR	**12**	1	51	698	13.7	**80**	4	0
1949	LAR	**12**	11	77	1,013	13.2	51	**9**	0
1950	LAR	**12**	**12**	**84**	**1,116**	13.3	53	7	**3**
1951	LAR	7	7	32	528	**16.5**	54	3	0
1952	LAR	**12**	11	38	600	12.5	36	6	0
1953	LAR	8	5	23	278	12.1	31	4	1
1954	LAR	10	8	36	546	15.2	43	3	0
1955	LAR	**12**	**12**	44	569	12.9	31	2	0
1956	LAR	2	2	5	49	9.8	18	0	0
Career		87	69	400	5,397	13.5	80	38	4

=== Head coaching record ===
Team	Year	Regular season					Postseason			
Team	Year	Won	Lost	Ties	Win %	Finish	Won	Lost	Win %	Result
NO	1967	3	11	0	.214	4th in NFL Capitol	–	–	–	–
NO	1968	4	9	1	.321	3rd in NFL Century	–	–	–	–
NO	1969	5	9	0	.357	3rd in NFL Capitol	–	–	–	–
NO	1970	1	5	1	.214	Fired	–	–	–	–
Total		13	34	2	.286		–	–	–	–
