= Greg Wojcik =

American football player (1946–2005)

No. 51, 68, 73, 78
- Positions: Center, defensive end, defensive tackle

Personal information
- Born: January 27, 1946; Jamestown, North Dakota, U.S.
- Died: December 17, 2005 (aged 59)
- Listed height: 6 ft 6 in (1.98 m)
- Listed weight: 268 lb (122 kg)

Career information
- High school: Huntington Beach (Huntington Beach, California)
- College: Orange Coast (1963–1964); USC (1965–1966)
- NFL draft: 1967: undrafted

Career history
- Orange County Ramblers (1967–1968); New Orleans Saints (1970)*; Richmond Saints (1970); Los Angeles Rams (1971); San Diego Chargers (1972–1973); The Hawaiians (1974); Chicago Bears (1975)*; St. Louis Cardinals (1975)*; San Diego Chargers (1975)
- * Offseason or practice squad member only
- Stats at Pro Football Reference

Gregory Steven Wojcik (January 7, 1946 – December 17, 2005) was an American professional football player who was a center for the Los Angeles Rams and the San Diego Chargers of the National Football League (NFL). He also played for the Orange County Ramblers of the Continental Football League (COFL), the Richmond Saints of the Atlantic Coast Football League (ACFL), and the Hawaiians of the World Football League (WFL). He played college football for the USC Trojans.

== College football career ==
Wojcik first enrolled at Orange Coast College, a community college in Costa Mesa, California. He spent two years at Orange Coast before enrolling at the University of Southern California, where he played for the Trojans for one year in 1965. His college football career was cut short due to injury, as he missed the entire 1966 season.

== Professional football career ==
=== Orange County Ramblers ===
Wojcik, who went undrafted in the 1967 NFL Draft, joined the local Orange County Ramblers for their inaugural season in the Continental Football League, playing center. He remained with the team for their second and final season in 1968, playing defensive end that year.

=== New Orleans Saints ===
On May 13, 1970, Wojcik signed with the New Orleans Saints. He was waived three months later on August 13, and joined the Saints' minor league affiliate, the Richmond Saints of the Atlantic Coast Football League. He played defensive tackle while with the Richmond Saints.

=== Los Angeles Rams ===
On September 22, 1971, Wojcik signed with the Los Angeles Rams of the National Football League. He played in ten games with the Rams in 1971 and recorded half a sack.

=== San Diego Chargers (first stint) ===
On January 29, 1972, the Rams traded Wojcik along with Deacon Jones and Lee White to the Chargers for Jeff Staggs, a 1972 second-round pick (30th overall–Jim Bertelsen) and 1973 second- and third-round picks (31st and 60th overall–Cullen Bryant and Tim Stokes respectively).

During the 1972 season, Wojcik played in seven games with two starts at left defensive tackle. He recorded two sacks.

In 1973, Wojcik was moved to right defensive tackle and played ten games at the position, recording another two sacks.

=== The Hawaiians ===
On May 2, 1974, Wojcik signed with The Hawaiians of the World Football League. He played defensive end and defensive tackle with the team, which made it to the World Bowl semifinals.

=== Chicago Bears ===
On July 10, 1975, Wojcik signed with the Chicago Bears.

=== St. Louis Cardinals ===
On July 30, 1975, the Bears traded Wojcik to the St. Louis Cardinals in exchange for center Wes Miller. He was released on September 15.

=== San Diego Chargers (second stint) ===
On October 29, 1975, Wojcik signed with the San Diego Chargers for a second time. He played six games with the team at defensive tackle in 1975 before his release on December 1, 1976.
