= Ray Schmautz =

American football player (born 1943)

Ray Schmautz (born January 26, 1943, in Chula Vista, California) is an American former professional football player who was a linebacker for the Oakland Raiders of the American Football League (AFL). He played college football for the San Diego State Aztecs. He played 10 games for Raiders in the 1966.

Ray was traded to the Denver Broncos in 1967 along with the defensive end Rich Jackson and outside guard Dick Tyson for the wide receiver Lionel Taylor and center Jerry Sturm. Schmautz retired after the 1967 season to become a Christian minister in Upland, California. He is now retired, and living in Florida.
