= Jerry Sturm =

American gridiron football player (1936–2020)

No. 72, 73, 62, 55
- Position: Offensive lineman

Personal information
- Born: December 31, 1936; English, Indiana, U.S.
- Died: June 17, 2020 (aged 83); Littleton, Colorado, U.S.
- Listed height: 6 ft 3 in (1.91 m)
- Listed weight: 260 lb (118 kg)

Career information
- High school: Terre Haute (IN) Gerstmeyer
- College: Illinois
- NFL draft: 1961: undrafted

Career history
- Saskatchewan Roughriders (1958); Calgary Stampeders (1959–1960); Denver Broncos (1961–1966); New Orleans Saints (1967–1970); Houston Oilers (1971); Philadelphia Eagles (1972)

Awards and highlights
- 2× AFL All-Star (1964, 1966)
- Stats at Pro Football Reference

Jerry Gordon Sturm (December 31, 1936 – June 17, 2020) was an American professional gridiron football player. After entering college on a basketball scholarship, he joined the college football team at the University of Illinois at Urbana–Champaign. He played professionally in the Canadian Football League (CFL) for the Saskatchewan Roughriders (1958), and Calgary Stampeders (1959–1960), the American Football League (AFL) for the Denver Broncos (1961–1966), and in the National Football League (NFL) for the New Orleans Saints (1967–1970), Houston Oilers (1971), and Philadelphia Eagles (1972). He was an American Football League All-Star in 1964 and 1966.

In 1971, he was offered a bribe of $10,000 to intentionally cause his team to lose a game, at a time when he only made $30,000 annually. Instead of taking the bribe, he informed the FBI and worked with them against the parties conspiring to fix the game.

== Early life ==
Sturm was born on December 31, 1936, in English, Indiana. When Sturm was 15, in 1952, his family moved from Richmond, Indiana to Terre Haute, Indiana, just before he started high school. He attended Gerstmeyer Technical High School, in Terre Haute. As a sophomore (1952–53), he was a backup center on the school's basketball team, that lost in the Indiana state high school basketball championship game, 42–41 (though Sturm did not play in that game). As a junior (1953–54), he starred as a 6 ft 2 in (1.88 m), 200 lb. (90.7 kg) center and helped Gerstmeyer reach the Indiana high school basketball tournament final four for a second consecutive year. Gerstmeyer lost, 60–48. Sturm was called for a number of personal fouls in the first half and did not play in the second half of Gerstmeyer's final four loss to eventual tournament champion Milan High School.

The 1954-55 basketball team was placed on a one-year probation in February 1955. During a late January game, Gerstmeyer coach Howard Sharpe engaged in a dispute with two game officials over which opponent should be taking foul shots. One official pushed an incensed Sharpe off the court twice, conduct for which the official was later censured (both officials also being censured for not calling technical fouls on Sharpe). Sharpe was said to have incited the Gerstmeyer fans against the officials. Sturm told the officials he would "beat them up if he caught them on the street", later apologizing for that statement made during the heat of the incident.

As a sophomore, Sturm played offensive and defensive end on Gerstmeyer's football team, under coach Ben Blair. He later played fullback, weighing 220 lb. by the beginning of his senior year in September 1954. By the end of his senior year (December 1954), Sturm was 6 ft 3 in (1.91 m) 237 lb. (107.5). His nickname was Ferdinand. He played on the baseball team as a power hitting and good fielding first baseman, and was also on the track team. Sturm was also a Golden Gloves heavyweight boxer as a teenager.

== College career ==
Sturm attended the University of Illinois on a basketball and baseball scholarship. However, as a freshman, he became a tackle on the school's freshman football team. He was injured during the football team's spring practice season his junior year. It has been reported that he was never eligible to play varsity football at Illinois.

== Professional football ==
=== Canadian football career ===
He began his professional football career in the Canadian Football League. In 1958, he played for the Saskatchewan Roughriders of the Western Interprovincial Football Union (WIFU), and in 1959 and 1960, he played for the Calgary Stampeders of the WIFU. He played offensive tackle in Saskatchewan and Calgary, as well as center in Calgary. In 1960, he was the center for future NFL quarterback Joe Kapp. He was named as an "import" player, not being a Canadian citizen.

=== Denver Broncos ===
Sturm chose to leave the Stampeders in early July 1961 and the team refused to allow him to rejoin the club. He was among a number of Stampeders who quit the team under new coach Bobby Dobbs's training camp regime. This also was at a time when the one-year old American Football League (AFL) began competing with the CFL for players. The AFL's Denver Broncos signed Sturm in early July 1961.

In 1961, Sturm started 10 games at left offensive tackle for the Broncos. He was also used as a running back, and had eight carries for 31 yards, and two pass receptions for -1 yards. These were the only rushing attempts and receptions in his AFL and NFL career. In 1962, he started eight games for the Broncos, at left tackle or left guard.

In 1963, the Broncos moved Sturm to center. He started all 14 games for the first time in his AFL career. In 1964, he again started all 14 games at center, and was named an AFL All-Star for the first time. It was reported at the time that he was named to the West All-Star Team as a guard, with Jim Otto being named the only center for the West. Despite being an All-Star during a year he played at center, the Broncos moved Sturm to left guard in 1965, where he started in 12 games. He was injured during the season. They considered moving him back to center in 1966, but instead he became the starter at right guard. He started all 14 games in 1966, and was selected an AFL All-Star at guard.

=== Oakland Raiders and New Orleans Saints ===
In July 1967, the Broncos traded Sturm and receiver Lionel Taylor to the Oakland Raiders for linebacker Rich Jackson, guard Rich Tyson and offensive lineman Ray Schautz. Sturm walked out of the Raiders' training camp in mid-August. The Raiders released Sturm in October 1967, and he signed as a free agent with the New Orleans Saints in early November. He is not listed on the Raiders 1967 roster.

He played in seven games for the Saints, starting three at tackle, and played on the Saints' special teams. In a December game against the Baltimore Colts, he played well at tackle against Colts defensive end Ordell Braase (who was selected to the Pro Bowl and named second-team All-Pro by the Associated Press that season), and the Saints named him their "blocker of the week". Sturm said the only difference between the NFL and AFL at the time was that the NFL had more quality quarterbacks.

Sturm became the Saints starting left tackle in 1968. He started all 14 games. He suffered a head injury in 1968, that requirement repeated surgeries over the next few years. He trimmed down to 257 pounds (116.6 kg) to play with the Saints, believing he needed to be more fit as he got older. In 1969, the Saints moved Sturm to center, and he continued as the team's starting center in 1970. He started 14 games in 1969, and 10 in 1970. The Saints released Sturm after the 1970 season. Sturm had told general manager Vic Schwenk that if Schwenk and new coach J. D. Roberts were both going to continue in those roles the following season, then he would retire.

=== Houston Oilers and Philadelphia Eagles ===
The Houston Oilers claimed Sturm after he was released by the Saints. He played one season in Houston (1971), starting seven games at center, sharing time with Walt Suggs. Sturm was released after the 1971 season. In 1973, Sturm revealed that while playing for the Oilers, a friend and former AFL teammate offered Sturm $10,000 to intentionally cause the Oilers to lose a football game. At the time he was only earning $30,000/year in salary. Sturm informed the Federal Bureau of Investigation (FBI), rather than take the $10,000.

Sturm retired in 1972, however, the Philadelphia Eagles convinced him to come out of retirement in late November 1972, when their starting center Mike Evans was injured. The Eagles only intended to use Sturm as a long snapper on punts and field goals. Sturm only played in one game, and had a knee injury. He officially retired for good in April 1973.

== Honors ==
In 2019, he was named among the top 100 players in Broncos history.

== Personal life ==
During his career, he owned a chain of Mexican restaurants and a golf course in Denver. After retiring from football, Sturm owned "The South" restaurant along with his wife, Debbie, in Englewood, Colorado. The restaurant serves both Mexican and American food, with an emphasis on providing multiple television screens for live viewing Denver's sports teams during games.

== Dementia, CTE and death ==
Sturm died on June 17, 2020, in Littleton, Colorado. He had been suffering dementia prior to his death. His wife Deborah had difficulty in getting Sturm promptly evaluated under the settlement program through which the NFL would provide financial compensation for the effects of head injuries. She eventually gave up in her efforts during his remaining life because of his immobility from advancing dementia. His family announced that they would donate Sturm's brain to the Concussion Legacy Foundation at Boston University to study the effects of brain trauma from Sturm's football career. After his death, an autopsy showed Sturm had severe chronic traumatic encephalopathy (CTE).

During his playing career, in 1968, Sturm's helmet was crushed against his head during a game, weakening the bones in his head. This required a number of surgeries in the ensuing years. He had a special helmet made, but his doctor anticipated the need for more surgeries.

Sturm was survived by his wife Deborah, children Brett and Cynthia, nine grandchildren and five great-grandchildren. He was predeceased by his children Jerry Lee and Bethany.

== See also ==
- List of American Football League players
