= Tom Dempsey =

American football player (1947–2020)

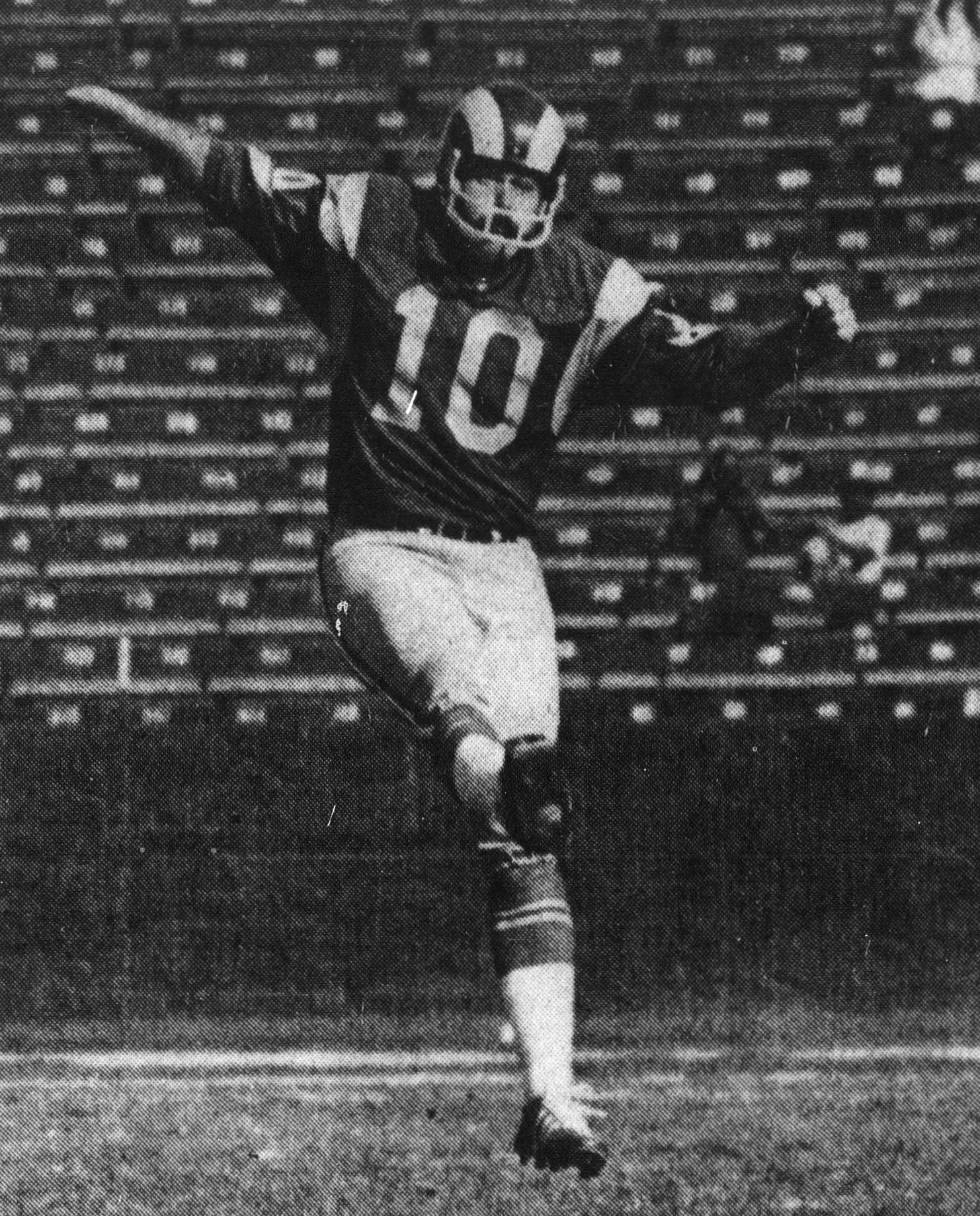
- Dempsey with the Los Angeles Rams in 1975

No. 19, 10, 23, 6
- Position: Placekicker

Personal information
- Born: January 12, 1947; Milwaukee, Wisconsin, U.S.
- Died: April 4, 2020 (aged 73); New Orleans, Louisiana, U.S.
- Listed height: 6 ft 2 in (1.88 m)
- Listed weight: 255 lb (116 kg)

Career information
- High school: San Dieguito (Encinitas, California)
- College: Palomar
- NFL draft: 1968: undrafted

Career history
- San Diego Chargers (1968)*; New Orleans Saints (1969–1970); Philadelphia Eagles (1971–1974); Los Angeles Rams (1975–1976); Houston Oilers (1977); Buffalo Bills (1978–1979)
- * Offseason or practice squad member only

Awards and highlights
- First-team All-Pro (1969); Pro Bowl (1969); George Halas Award (1971); New Orleans Saints Hall of Fame

Career NFL statistics
- PAT: 252/282 (89.4%)
- FG: 159/258 (61.6%)
- Stats at Pro Football Reference

Thomas John Dempsey (January 12, 1947 – April 4, 2020) was an American professional football player who was a placekicker in the National Football League (NFL) for the New Orleans Saints, Philadelphia Eagles, Los Angeles Rams, Houston Oilers and Buffalo Bills. He was born with no toes on his right foot and no fingers on his right hand. Dempsey wore a special shoe for kicking. Unlike the "soccer-style" approach which was becoming more widely used during his career, Dempsey's kicking style was the then-standard straight-toe style. With the Saints in 1970, he made a 63-yard field goal, setting an NFL record which stood for 43 years.

== Early life and education ==
Dempsey was born in Milwaukee and attended high school and college in Southern California. He was born with no toes on his right foot and no fingers on his right hand. To accommodate his foot structure, Dempsey wore a custom, flat-front kicking shoe that had no toe box.

== NFL career ==
Dempsey's special kicking shoe

Dempsey was born without toes on his right foot and no fingers on his right hand. He wore a modified shoe with a flattened and enlarged toe surface. The custom-made $200 (equivalent to $1,658 in 2025) shoe generated controversy about whether such a shoe gave a player an unfair advantage. When reporters would ask him if he thought it was unfair, he said, "Unfair, eh? How 'bout you try kickin' a 63-yard field goal to win it with 2 seconds left an' yer wearin' a square shoe, oh yeah, and no toes either." Additionally, ESPN Sport Science analyzed Dempsey's kick and determined his modified shoe gave Dempsey no advantage.

The league made two rule changes in the subsequent years to discourage further long field goal attempts. The first was in 1974, which moved the goal posts from the goal line to the back of the end zone, adding ten yards to the kick distance, and awarded the ball to the defense on a missed kick at the spot from where the ball was hiked. (This was changed in 1994 to the spot of the kick.) Then, in 1977, the NFL added a rule, informally known as the "Tom Dempsey Rule", that "any shoe that is worn by a player with an artificial limb on his kicking leg must have a kicking surface that conforms to that of a normal kicking shoe."

=== Field goal record ===
Dempsey is most widely known for kicking a 63-yard field goal as time expired to give the Saints a 19–17 win over the Detroit Lions on November 8, 1970, at Tulane Stadium in New Orleans. Prior to 1974, the goal posts in the NFL were on the goal lines instead of the end lines. With time running out in the game, the Saints attempted a field goal with holder Joe Scarpati spotting at the Saints' own 37-yard line. The snap from Jackie Burkett was good, and Dempsey's kick just barely cleared the crossbar to make the try good. The win was one of only two for the Saints that season.

With the kick, Dempsey broke Bert Rechichar's NFL record for longest field goal by seven yards. His record was tied three times—by Jason Elam with the Denver Broncos in 1998, Sebastian Janikowski with the Oakland Raiders in 2011, and David Akers with the San Francisco 49ers in 2012—before it was broken on December 8, 2013, by Matt Prater, who hit a 64-yard field goal.

Since Dempsey was the only kicker to make a field goal from more than sixty yards prior to the relocation of the goal posts, he remains the only player in NFL history to successfully kick a field goal from beyond his own team's 40-yard line.

== Career regular season statistics ==
Career high/best bolded

Regular season statistics
Season	Team (record)	G	FGM	FGA	%	<20	20-29	30-39	40-49	50+	LNG	BLK	XPM	XPA	%	PTS
1969	NO (5–9)	14	22	**41**	53.7	5–6	6–7	3–6	**7–11**	1–11	55	0	33	35	94.3	99
1970	NO (2–11–1)	14	18	34	52.9	4–5	6–8	1–5	4–7	3–9	**63**	0	16	17	94.1	70
1971	PHI (6–7–1)	5	12	17	70.6	0–0	6–7	1–2	2–3	**3–5**	54	0	13	14	92.9	49
1972	PHI (2–11–1)	14	20	35	57.1	6–6	3–6	**7–10**	2–9	2–4	52	0	11	12	91.7	71
1973	PHI (5–8–1)	14	**24**	40	60.0	**7–7**	4–7	7–11	4–9	2–6	51	0	34	34	**100.0**	**106**
1974	PHI (7–7)	14	10	16	62.5	1–1	1–2	4–6	4–6	0–1	48	0	26	30	86.7	56
1975	LAR (12–2)	14	21	26	**80.8**	2–2	**7–7**	**7–10**	4–5	1–2	51	0	31	36	86.1	94
1976	LAR (10–3–1)	14	17	26	65.4	2–2	5–8	4–5	6–10	0–1	49	0	**36**	**44**	81.8	87
1977	HOU (8–6)	5	4	6	66.7	0–0	3–3	1–2	0–1	0–0	37	0	8	11	72.7	20
1978	BUF (5–11)	**16**	10	13	76.9	0–0	5–5	4–5	1–3	0–0	46	0	**36**	38	94.7	66
1979	BUF (7–9)	3	1	4	25.0	1–1	0–0	0–2	0–1	0–0	18	0	8	11	72.7	11
Career (11 seasons)		127	159	258	61.6	28–30	46–60	39–64	34–65	12–39	63	0	252	282	89.4	729

== Post-career ==
The hurricane flooded me out of a lot of memorabilia, but it can't flood out the memories.

— Dempsey on the effects of Hurricane Katrina

In 1983, Dempsey was inducted into the American Football Association's Semi-Pro Football Hall of Fame.

After retiring from professional football, Dempsey resided with his wife Carlene, who taught history at Kehoe-France, a private school in Metairie, Louisiana, a suburb of New Orleans. His house was flooded during Hurricane Katrina in 2005.

== Personal life and death ==
Dempsey married Carlene and had three children, one named Ashley.

In January 2013, Dempsey revealed he had dementia. Psychiatrist Daniel Amen made the initial diagnosis of damage to Dempsey's brain. During medical examinations and scans, Amen found three holes in the brain, along with other damage.

On March 30, 2020, Dempsey tested positive for COVID-19 during the coronavirus pandemic. He was one of 15 residents at a New Orleans senior residence to test positive for the virus. Dempsey died on April 4, 2020, due to COVID.
