= Richmond Roadrunners =

Defunct American football team

- Founded: 1968
- Folded: 1970
- League: Atlantic Coast Football League
- Team history: Richmond Mustangs (1967); Richmond Roadrunners (1968-1969); Richmond Saints (1970)
- Based in: Richmond, Virginia
- Arena: City Stadium
- Championships: 0

The Richmond Roadrunners/Richmond Saints were an Atlantic Coast Football League team that played four seasons from 1967 to 1970. They were affiliated with the New Orleans Saints from 1969 to 1970. They changed their name from the "Roadrunners" to the "Saints" in their final season, 1970. The Roadrunners played their home games at City Stadium. They had three head coaches in their existence.

== Season-by-season ==
	Year	League	W	L	T	Finish	Coach
Richmond Mustangs	1967	United American Football League	7	0	0	1st (Declared Champions)	Dick James
Richmond Roadrunners	1968	Atlantic Coast Football League	4	7	1	3rd, Southern Division	Dick James
Richmond Roadrunners	1969	Atlantic Coast Football League	7	5	0	2nd, Southern Division	J. D. Roberts
Richmond Saints	1970	Atlantic Coast Football League	2	10	0	6th, Southern Division	J. D. Roberts, Doug McNeil (Note: J. D. Roberts was promoted to head coach of the New Orleans Saints, he was replaced by Doug McNeil)
