= Tony Baker (running back, born 1945) =

American football player (1945–1998)

- Baker in 1972

No. 38, 35
- Position: Running back

Personal information
- Born: February 16, 1945; Burlington, Iowa, U.S.
- Died: August 9, 1998 (aged 53); Mediapolis, Iowa, U.S.
- Listed height: 5 ft 11 in (1.80 m)
- Listed weight: 229 lb (104 kg)

Career information
- High school: Burlington
- College: Iowa State
- NFL draft: 1966: undrafted

Career history
- Des Moines Warriors (1967); New Orleans Saints (1968–1971); Philadelphia Eagles (1971-1972); Los Angeles Rams (1973–1974); San Diego Chargers (1975)

Awards and highlights
- Pro Bowl (1969)

Career NFL statistics
- Rushing yards: 2,087
- Rushing average: 3.9
- Receptions: 82
- Receiving yards: 685
- Total touchdowns: 17
- Stats at Pro Football Reference

Vernon Anthony "Touchdown Tony" Baker (February 16, 1945 – August 9, 1998) was an American professional football player who was a running back in the National Football League (NFL). He played from 1968 to 1975, and played for the New Orleans Saints, the Philadelphia Eagles, the Los Angeles Rams, and finally, the San Diego Chargers, and had one Pro Bowl appearance, in 1969.

== Football career ==
Baker graduated from Burlington Community High School in 1963, earning a scholarship to Iowa State University the following year, and graduating from there in 1966. He then played semi-pro ball for a season and a half with the Des Moines Warriors of the Professional Football League of America, before being discovered by a talent scout for the New Orleans Saints. He signed a contract with the Saints, and begin his NFL career the following year, making an appearance in the Pro Bowl in his second season. It was during this rookie season that sports broadcaster Howard Cosell gave him the nickname Touchdown Tony. He ended his career in 1975, playing with the San Diego Chargers as a backup.

== Death ==
On August 10, 1998, Baker was killed in a car accident on U.S. Route 61, approximately 15 miles (24 km) north of Burlington, Iowa following a high school class reunion. He was buried in Aspen Grove Cemetery in Burlington, next to his mother, with many of his old NFL teammates in attendance. His burial plot was chosen by his family with two trees in the distance appearing as though they were goalpost uprights. A misprint on his headstone has him named Vernon G. Baker, instead of Vernon A. Baker.
