= Andy Livingston =

American football player (born 1944)

No. 48
- Position: Running back

Personal information
- Born: October 21, 1944 (age 82); Eufaula, Oklahoma, U.S.
- Listed height: 6 ft 1 in (1.85 m)
- Listed weight: 235 lb (107 kg)

Career information
- High school: Mesa (Mesa, Arizona)
- College: Phoenix College (1962)
- NFL draft: 1964: undrafted

Career history
- Chicago Bears (1964–1968); New Orleans Saints (1969–1970); Philadelphia Eagles (1971)*
- * Offseason or practice squad member only

Awards and highlights
- Pro Bowl (1969)

Career NFL statistics
- Rushing yards: 1,216
- Rushing average: 4.2
- Receptions: 46
- Receiving yards: 474
- Total touchdowns: 11
- Stats at Pro Football Reference

Andy Livingston (born October 21, 1944) is an American former professional football player who was a running back in the National Football League (NFL). He played professionally for the Chicago Bears and the New Orleans Saints.

== Early life ==
Livingston was born to L.B. Livingston and Annie Livingston in Eufaula, Oklahoma. He attended Mesa High School in Arizona but did not graduate. He was an All-American tailback in 1961, and was the Arizona high school player of the year. He also attended Phoenix College.

== Professional career ==
Livingston was nineteen years old when he first joined the Chicago Bears. He was 20 when he made his NFL debut on December 5, 1964, against the Green Bay Packers. He is the youngest player in NFL history appear in a game (20 years, 45 days) and to score a touchdown (20 years, 53 days). The NFL granted him a hardship exemption, enabling him to leave college early. He also attended Phoenix College.

Livingston played for the Chicago Bears from 1964 until 1968. He was traded to the New Orleans Saints in 1969, and played until 1970 when he retired from football after suffering a knee injury.

== Life after the NFL ==
Livingston helped found the nonprofit foundation "Kids 4 Today" in 1991.

== Personal life ==
Livingston currently resides in Mesa, Arizona with his wife and kids, working as a CPA. Livingston's brother Warren Livingston played cornerback in the NFL for the Dallas Cowboys.
