= Mike Morgan (linebacker, born 1942) =

American football player (1942–1996)

No. 89, 52, 57
- Position: Linebacker

Personal information
- Born: January 31, 1942; Shreveport, Louisiana, U.S.
- Died: December 2, 1996 (aged 54); Baton Rouge, Louisiana, U.S.
- Listed height: 6 ft 4 in (1.93 m)
- Listed weight: 242 lb (110 kg)

Career information
- High school: Natchez (Natchez, Mississippi)
- College: LSU (1960-1963)
- NFL draft: 1964: 17th round, 226th overall pick

Career history
- Philadelphia Eagles (1964–1967); Washington Redskins (1968); New Orleans Saints (1969–1970)

Career NFL statistics
- Fumble recoveries: 7
- Interceptions: 6
- Total touchdowns: 2
- Sacks: 15.5
- Stats at Pro Football Reference

Michael Lee Morgan (January 31, 1942 – December 2, 1996) was an American professional football linebacker in the National Football League (NFL) for the Philadelphia Eagles, Washington Redskins, and New Orleans Saints. He played college football at Louisiana State University for the LSU Tigers and was selected in the 17th round of the 1964 NFL draft.
