= Wayne Colman =

American football player (born 1946)

No. 49, 59
- Position: Linebacker

Personal information
- Born: April 13, 1946 (age 80); Ventnor City, New Jersey, U.S.
- Listed height: 6 ft 2 in (1.88 m)
- Listed weight: 230 lb (104 kg)

Career information
- High school: Atlantic City (Atlantic City, New Jersey)
- College: Temple
- NFL draft: 1968: undrafted

Career history
- Philadelphia Eagles (1968–1969); New Orleans Saints (1969-1976)

Career NFL statistics
- Fumble recoveries: 6
- Interceptions: 3
- Sacks: 2
- Stats at Pro Football Reference

Wayne Charles Colman (born April 13, 1946) is an American former professional football player who was a linebacker for nine seasons in the National Football League (NFL) with the Philadelphia Eagles and New Orleans Saints. He played college football for the Temple Owls.

A native of Ventnor, Colman played at Atlantic City High School before attending Temple University.

His Son Doug Colman also played in the NFL.
