= Richmond Rebels (Continental Football League) =

Defunct American football team

- Founded: 1964
- Folded: 1967
- League: Atlantic Coast Football League; Continental Football League
- Based in: Richmond, Virginia
- Arena: City Stadium
- Championships: 0

The Richmond Rebels were a professional American football team based in Richmond, Virginia. They began play in 1964 as a member of the Atlantic Coast Football League. The Rebels became a charter member of the Continental Football League in 1965. The team consistently lost money for its owners, so after the 1966 COFL season the franchise was first put up for sale and then returned to the league. When new ownership could not be found the team's players were offered in a dispersal draft, putting an end to the franchise.

They were the third Richmond team to carry the "Rebels" name. The previous two played in the Virginia-Carolina Football League in 1937, and in the Dixie League/American Association from 1946 to 1950.

== Season-by-season ==
	Year	League	W	L	T	Finish	Coach
Richmond Rebels	1964	Atlantic Coast Football League	8	5	1	4th, Southern Division	Pete Pihos
Richmond Rebels	1965	Continental Football League	6	8	0	3rd, Western Division	Pete Pihos
Richmond Rebels	1966	Continental Football League	4	10	0	4th, Western Division	Steve Sucic
