= J. D. Roberts =

American football player and coach (1932–2021)

Personal information
- Born: October 24, 1932; Oklahoma City, Oklahoma, U.S.
- Died: May 25, 2021 (aged 88); Oklahoma City, Oklahoma, U.S.

Career information
- High school: Jesuit (Dallas, Texas)
- College: Oklahoma
- NFL draft: 1954: 17th round, 195th overall pick

Career history
- Quantico Marines (1956) Assistant coach; Denver (1957) Line coach; Oklahoma (1958–1959) Assistant coach; Navy (1960) Line coach; Auburn (1961) Offensive line coach; Houston (1962–1964) Line coach; New Orleans Saints (1967–1968) Linebackers coach; Richmond Roadrunners (1969–1970) Head coach; New Orleans Saints (1970–1973) Head coach

Awards and highlights
- Outland Trophy (1953); UPI Lineman of the Year (1953); Consensus All-American (1953); 2× First-team All-Big Seven (1952, 1953)

Head coaching record
- Regular season: 7–25–3 (.243)
- Coaching profile at Pro Football Reference
- College Football Hall of Fame

John David Roberts (October 24, 1932 – May 25, 2021) was an American college and professional football coach and player. He was the head coach of the New Orleans Saints of the National Football League (NFL) from the middle of the 1970 season until his dismissal after four preseason games in 1973. He played college football for the Oklahoma Sooners and was selected by the Green Bay Packers in the 17th round of the 1954 NFL draft.

== Early life ==
Roberts was born in Oklahoma City, but moved to Dallas at the age of 6. Even as a youth, he had interest in football: he and one of his friends sold programs before football games at the Cotton Bowl stadium in Dallas. He played three years of football on both offense and defense at Jesuit College Preparatory School of Dallas, from which he graduated in 1950. He was named to the Texas High School Football Hall of Fame in 1994. Jesuit College Preparatory School of Dallas added him to their Hall of Fame in 1999.

== College career ==
Roberts played as a guard on offense and defense for the University of Oklahoma. He won the Outland Trophy as the nation's top college lineman in 1953. That same year, he was a consensus All-America selection. He went on to be named to the College Football Hall of Fame in 1993. He finished 8th in the Heisman Trophy vote in 1953.

== Coaching career ==
Roberts was chosen in the 17th round (195th overall) of the 1954 NFL draft by the Green Bay Packers. However, he never played in a regular season NFL game. He served as a lieutenant in the United States Marine Corps and played for the Quantico Marines football team in 1955. A leg injury in 1956 ended his playing career and he instead served as an assistant to Quantico head coach Hal Harwood.

After leaving the Marines, Roberts served as an assistant football coach at the University of Denver, University of Oklahoma, the U.S. Naval Academy, Auburn University, and the University of Houston. In 1967 he became a scout and linebackers coach for the New Orleans Saints. He then served as head coach of the Saints' Atlantic Coast Football League affiliate, the Richmond Roadrunners until he was hired to coach the Saints.

Roberts was hired by Saints owner John Mecom on November 3, 1970, replacing Tom Fears after New Orleans began 1970 with a 1–5–1 record. His first game came five days later at Tulane Stadium against the Detroit Lions. The Saints won 19–17 when Tom Dempsey kicked a 63-yard (58 m) field goal, a record which broke the previous NFL mark by seven yards. Dempsey's record was tied by Jason Elam of the Denver Broncos in 1998, Sebastian Janikowski of the Oakland Raiders in 2011, and David Akers of the San Francisco 49ers in 2012, but nobody had bettered the mark until December 8, 2013, when Matt Prater of the Denver Broncos successfully made a 64-yard (59 m) field goal.

The Saints' success did not carry over following Dempsey's miracle kick. A 21–10 loss the next week to the Miami Dolphins started a six-game losing streak which left the Saints with a 2–11–1 mark for the season.

With the second pick in the 1971 NFL draft, Roberts and Mecom selected Ole Miss quarterback Archie Manning, who became the cornerstone for the woebegone franchise for the next decade. In Manning's first NFL game, his two-yard touchdown run on the game's final play gave the Saints a 24–20 victory over the Los Angeles Rams, the same team which defeated the Saints in the franchise's first game in 1967. Four weeks later, the Saints stunned the eventual Super Bowl champion Dallas Cowboys 24–14, but New Orleans finished the season 4–8–2.

New Orleans regressed sharply in 1972, falling back to 2–11–1, and Roberts was fired shortly after a 31–6 preseason loss to the New England Patriots on August 25, 1973.

== Post-coaching ==
Roberts went on to run an oil and gas business in Oklahoma City.

== Head coaching record ==
Team	Year	Regular season					Postseason			
Team	Year	Won	Lost	Ties	Win %	Finish	Won	Lost	Win %	Result
NO	1970	1	6	0	.143	4th in NFC West	–	–	–	–
NO	1971	4	8	2	.333	4th in NFC West	–	–	–	–
NO	1972	2	11	1	.154	4th in NFC West	–	–	–	–
NO Total		7	25	3	.243				–	
Total		7	25	3	.243				–	
