= Mike Rengel =

American football player (born 1946)

No. 75
- Position: Defensive tackle

Personal information
- Born: December 1, 1946 (age 79); Minneapolis, Minnesota, U.S.
- Listed height: 6 ft 5 in (1.96 m)
- Listed weight: 260 lb (118 kg)

Career information
- High school: De La Salle
- College: Hawaii
- NFL draft: 1968: undrafted

Career history
- Orange County Ramblers (1968); New Orleans Saints (1969–1970)
- Stats at Pro Football Reference

Michael James Rengel (born December 1, 1946) is an American former professional football player who was a defensive tackle for the New Orleans Saints of the National Football League (NFL). He played college football for the University of Hawaii
