= Dick James (American football) =

American football player (1934–2000)

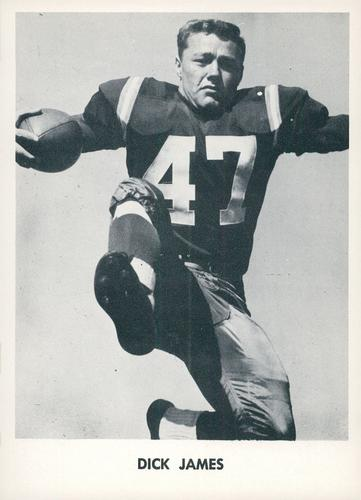

No. 47
- Positions: Halfback, cornerback

Personal information
- Born: May 22, 1934; Grants Pass, Oregon, U.S.
- Died: June 28, 2000 (aged 66); Grants Pass, Oregon, U.S.

Career information
- College: Oregon
- NFL draft: 1956: 8th round, 94th overall pick

Career history
- Washington Redskins (1956–1963); New York Giants (1964); Minnesota Vikings (1965)

Awards and highlights
- Pro Bowl (1961); 80 Greatest Redskins; Washington Commanders Ring of Fame; Second-team All-PCC (1955); Oregon Ducks Hall of Fame; Oregon Sports Hall of Fame

Career NFL statistics
- Total all-purpase yards: 9,227
- Touchdowns: 34
- Interceptions: 12
- Fumbles Recovered: 12
- Stats at Pro Football Reference

Richard Alwin James (May 22, 1934 – June 28, 2000) was an American professional football player who was a halfback and cornerback in the National Football League (NFL) for the Washington Redskins, New York Giants and Minnesota Vikings. He played college football for the Oregon Ducks and was selected in the eighth round of the 1956 NFL draft. James' mother was Mohawk/Mohican Native American.

He set a team record with four touchdowns in one game as the Redskins beat the Dallas Cowboys, 34–24 in 1961. He scored 34 touchdowns in his NFL career. James was one of the smallest players in the NFL at 5-9 and 175 pounds. James was also known as gymnast, performing such acts as walking on his hands down flights of stairs before games. He died in 2000 of prostate cancer at the age of 66.

He had a short stint as a sports announcer in the Washington DC area after he retired mainly covering the Redskins on game day.
