= 1970 Pro Bowl =

National Football League all-star game

1970 East–West Pro Bowl
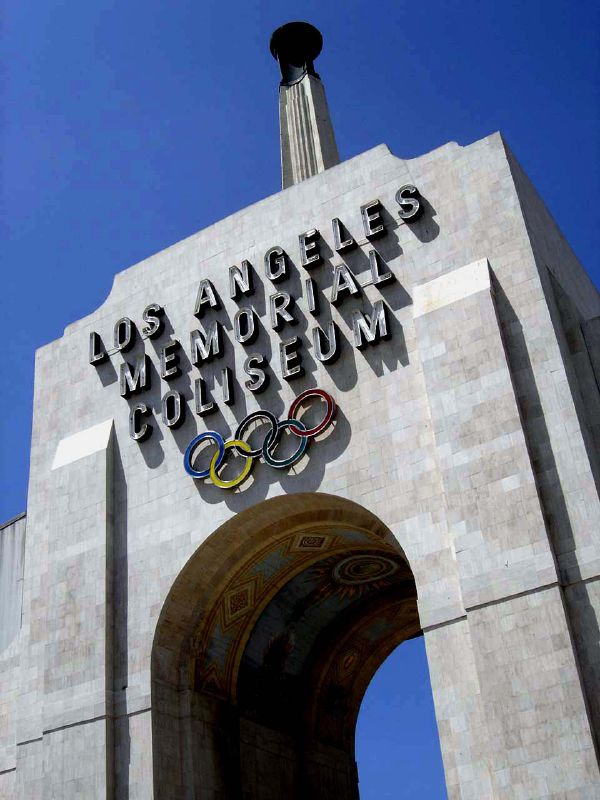
- The front of the L.A. Memorial Coliseum
Eastern Conference	Western Conference
13	16
Head coach: Tom Fears (New Orleans Saints)	Head coach: Norm Van Brocklin (Atlanta Falcons)
	1	2	3	4	Total
Eastern Conference	0	7	0	6	13
Western Conference	10	3	0	3	16
- Date: January 18, 1970
- Stadium: Los Angeles Memorial Coliseum; Los Angeles, California
- Co-MVPs: Gale Sayers (Chicago Bears, RB), George Andrie (Dallas Cowboys, DE)
- Attendance: 57,786

TV in the United States
- Network: CBS
- Announcers: Don Criqui, Frank Gifford, Frank Glieber

The 1970 Pro Bowl was the National Football League's twentieth annual all-star game which featured the outstanding performers from the 1969 season. The game was played on Sunday, January 18, 1970, at Los Angeles Memorial Coliseum in Los Angeles, California. The final score was West 16, East 13. Running back Gale Sayers of the Chicago Bears was named the game's offensive Most Valuable Player (MVP) for the third time after rushing for 75 yards on nine carries. Defensive end George Andrie of the Dallas Cowboys was selected as the defensive MVP.

Attendance at the game was 57,786. Norm Van Brocklin of the Atlanta Falcons coached the West squad while the East was led by the New Orleans Saints' Tom Fears. This was the last Pro Bowl to feature the Eastern Conference vs. Western Conference format. After the AFL–NFL merger was completed, future Pro Bowls would pit the AFC against the NFC.
