= Vic Schwenk =

American gridiron football coach and executive (1924–2016)

Biographical details
- Born: October 26, 1924; Dayton, Ohio, U.S.
- Died: March 14, 2016 (aged 91); California, U.S.

Playing career
- 1946: UCLA
- 1947–1949: Occidental
- Position: End

Coaching career (HC unless noted)
- 1950–1953: Colton HS (CA)
- 1954–1959: San Marino HS (CA)
- 1960–1963: Occidental
- 1964–1965: Los Angeles Rams (assistant)

Administrative career (AD unless noted)
- 1966: Edmonton Eskimos (GM)
- 1968–1972: New Orleans Saints (GM)

Head coaching record
- Overall: 23–12 (college)

Accomplishments and honors

Championships
- 2 SCIAC (1960, 1963)

Victor Earl Schwenk (October 26, 1924 – March 14, 2016) was an American gridiron football coach and executive. He served as the head football at Occidental College in Los Angeles from 1960 to 1963, compiling a record of 23–12. Schwenk was the general manager for the Edmonton Eskimos of the Canadian Football League (CFL) in 1966 and the New Orleans Saints of the National Football League (NFL) from 1968 to 1972. He died in 2016.

== Head coaching record ==
=== College ===
Year	Team	Overall	Conference	Standing	Bowl/playoffs
Occidental Tigers (Southern California Intercollegiate Athletic Conference) (1960–1963)
1960	Occidental	5–3	4–1	T–1st	
1961	Occidental	6–3	2–2	3rd	
1962	Occidental	6–3	2–3	T–4th	
1963	Occidental	6–3	2–1	T–1st	
Occidental:		23–12	10–7		
Total:		23–12			
National championship Conference title Conference division title or championship game berth
