= 1993 Pacific-10 Conference football season =

American college football season

- League: NCAA Division I FBS (Football Bowl Subdivision)
- Sport: Football
- Teams: 10

Regular Season
- Champion: UCLA Bruins, USC Trojans, Arizona Wildcats

Football seasons
- 1992 1994

1993 Pacific-10 Conference football standings
	Conf.					Overall
Team	W		L		T	W		L		T
No. 10 Arizona +	6	–	2	–	0	10	–	2	–	0
No. 18 UCLA +	6	–	2	–	0	8	–	4	–	0
USC +	6	–	2	–	0	8	–	5	–	0
Washington	5	–	3	–	0	7	–	4	–	0
No. 25 California	4	–	4	–	0	9	–	4	–	0
Arizona State	4	–	4	–	0	6	–	5	–	0
Washington State	3	–	5	–	0	5	–	6	–	0
Oregon	2	–	6	–	0	5	–	6	–	0
Oregon State	2	–	6	–	0	4	–	7	–	0
Stanford	2	–	6	–	0	4	–	7	–	0
+ – Conference co-champions; Rankings from AP Poll

The Pacific-10 Conference football season in 1993 ended in a three-way tie for first place between the UCLA Bruins, USC Trojans, and Arizona Wildcats. UCLA won 27–21 over their crosstown rival, USC, to earn the conference's bid to the 1994 Rose Bowl.

== Awards and honors ==
=== Conference awards ===
The following individuals won the conference's annual player and coach awards:

- Offensive Player of the Year: J. J. Stokes, SE, UCLA
- Defensive Player of the Year: Rob Waldrop, NG, Arizona
- Coach of the Year: Terry Donahue, UCLA

=== All-Conference teams ===
The following players earned All-Pac-10 honors:

Offense:

Pos.	Name	Yr.	School
QB	Rob Johnson	Jr.	USC
RB	Napoleon Kaufman	Jr.	Washington
RB	Mario Bates	So.	Arizona State
WR	Johnnie Morton	Sr.	USC
WR	J. J. Stokes	Jr.	UCLA
TE	Mark Bruener	Jr.	Washington
OL	Todd Steussie	Sr.	California
OL	Vaughn Parker	Sr.	UCLA
OL	Tom Gallagher	Sr.	Washington
OL	Eric Mahlum	Sr.	California
OL	Craig Novitsky	Sr.	UCLA
PK	Bjorn Merten	Fr.	UCLA
AP	Chuck Levy	Jr.	Arizona

Defense:

Pos.	Name	Yr.	School
DL	Tedy Bruschi	So.	Arizona
DL	Rob Waldrop	Sr.	Arizona
DL	Willie McGinest	Sr.	USC
DL	DeWayne Patterson	Jr.	Washington State
LB	Anthony McClanahan	Sr.	Washington State
LB	Jerrott Willard	Jr.	California
LB	Sean Harris	Jr.	Arizona
LB	Jamir Miller	Jr.	UCLA
DB	Tony Bouie	Jr.	Arizona
DB	Marvin Goodwin	Jr.	UCLA
DB	Eric Zomalt	Sr.	California
DB	Craig Newsome	Jr.	Arizona State
P	Darren Schager	Jr.	UCLA
RS	Deron Pointer	Sr.	Washington State
