= Oregon Ducks football statistical leaders =

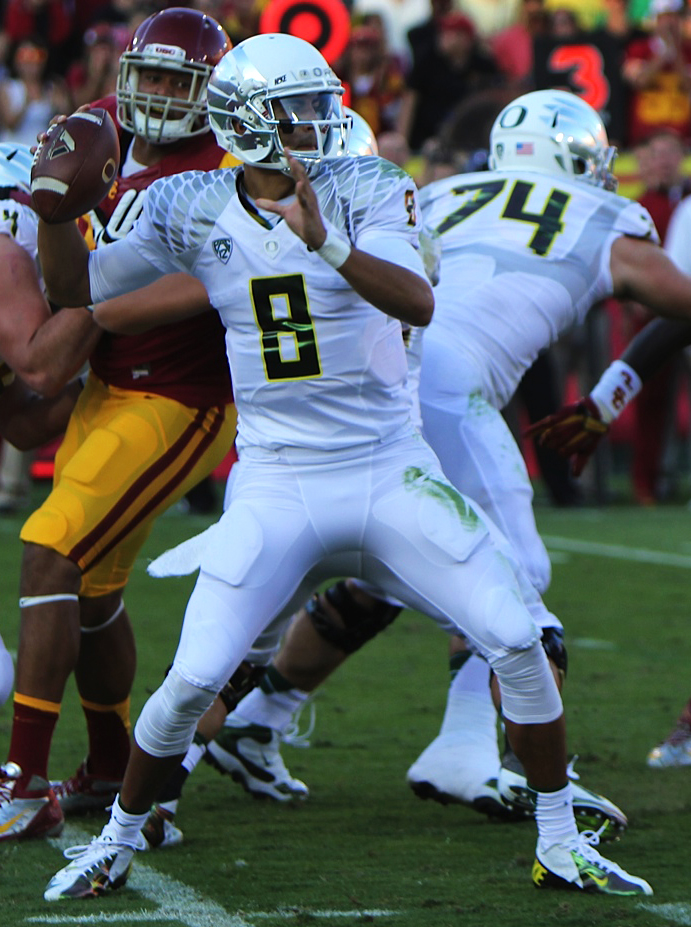
Marcus Mariota set Oregon career records in passing yards and passing touchdowns, despite only playing 3 seasons.

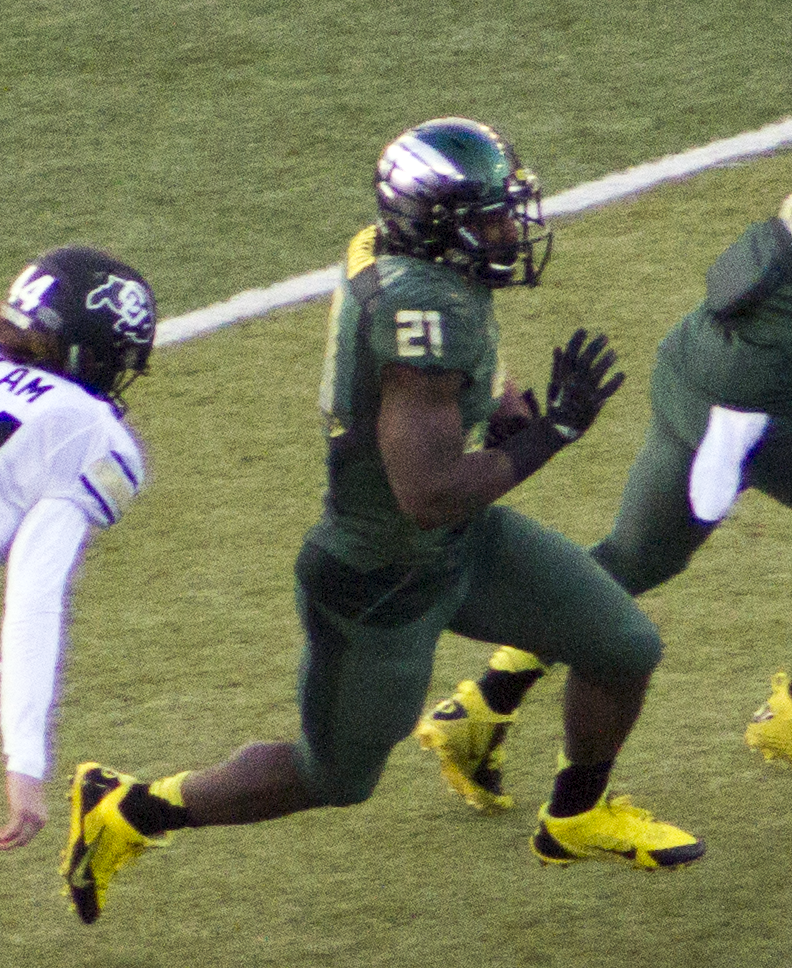
Royce Freeman is Oregon's career leader in rushing yards and rushing touchdowns.

The Oregon Ducks football statistical leaders are individual statistical leaders of the Oregon Ducks football program in various categories, including passing, rushing, receiving, total offense, defensive stats, and kicking. Within those areas, the lists identify single-game, single-season, and career leaders. As of the upcoming 2024 season, the Ducks represent the University of Oregon in the NCAA Division I FBS Big Ten Conference.

Although Oregon began competing in intercollegiate football in 1894, the school's official record book considers the "modern era" to have begun around 1940. Records from before this year are often incomplete and inconsistent, and they are generally not included in these lists.

These lists are dominated by more recent players for several reasons:

- Since 1940, seasons have increased from 10 games to 11 and then 12 games in length.
- The NCAA didn't allow freshmen to play varsity football until 1972 (with the exception of the World War II years), allowing players to have four-year careers.
- Bowl games only began counting toward single-season and career statistics in 2002. The Ducks have played in a bowl game in 20 seasons since this decision, allowing players on most recent teams at least one extra game to accumulate statistics. In fact, the Ducks played in two bowl games as part of the inaugural College Football Playoff after the 2014 season. Similarly, the Ducks played in the Pac-12 Championship Game 5 times during that game's existence, giving players in 2011, 2014, 2019, 2020, and 2021 yet another chance to increase their stat totals. The Big Ten has its own championship game, giving future Oregon teams a chance for an extra game in a given season.
- Oregon has had over 5,000 yards of total offense 17 times, all since 1997. The Ducks have broken the 6000-yard barrier eight times as a team, all since 2007. The Ducks eclipsed 7,000 yards in 2011 and 2013, and topped 8,000 yards in 2014.
- Due to COVID-19 issues, the NCAA ruled that the 2020 season would not count against the athletic eligibility of any football player, giving everyone who played in that season the opportunity for five years of eligibility instead of the normal four.

Stats on this page are updated through the 2025 season.

== Quarterback Wins ==
=== QB Career Wins ===
Career
Rank	Player	Wins	Losses	Win %	Years as a Starter
1	Marcus Mariota	36	5	.878	2012 2013 2014
2	Justin Herbert	29	13	.690	2016 2017 2018 2019
3	Joey Harrington	25	3	.893	2000 2001
4	Darron Thomas	24	3	.889	2010 2011
5	Danny O'Neil	23	24	.489	1991 1992 1993 1994
6	Bo Nix	22	5	.815	2022 2023
7	Kellen Clemens	20	12	.625	2003 2004 2005
8	Jeremiah Masoli	17	5	.773	2008 2009
9	Norm Van Brocklin	16	5	.762	1947 1948
10	Dan Fouts	16	16	.500	1970 1971 1972

== Passing ==
=== Passing yards ===
Career
Rank	Player	Yards	Years
1	Marcus Mariota	10,796	2012 2013 2014
2	Justin Herbert	10,541	2016 2017 2018 2019
3	Bill Musgrave	8,343	1987 1988 1989 1990
4	Danny O'Neil	8,301	1991 1992 1993 1994
5	Bo Nix	8,101	2022 2023
6	Joey Harrington	6,911	1998 1999 2000 2001
7	Chris Miller	6,681	1983 1984 1985 1986
8	Kellen Clemens	7,555	2002 2003 2004 2005
9	Dan Fouts	5,995	1970 1971 1972
10	Darron Thomas	5,910	2008 2010 2011

Single season
Rank	Player	Yards	Year
1	Bo Nix	4,508	2023
2	Marcus Mariota	4,454	2014
3	Dillon Gabriel	3,857	2024
4	Akili Smith	3,763	1998
5	Marcus Mariota	3,665	2013
6	Bo Nix	3,594	2022
7	Dante Moore	3,565	2025
8	Justin Herbert	3,471	2019
9	Danny O'Neil	3,224	1993
10	Justin Herbert	3,151	2018

Single game
Rank	Player	Yards	Year	Opponent
1	Bill Musgrave	489	1989	BYU
	Justin Herbert	489	2016	Arizona State
3	Ryan Perry-Smith	468	1996	Arizona State
4	Danny O'Neil	456	1994	Penn State
	Akili Smith	456	1998	Colorado
	Marcus Mariota	456	2013	Tennessee
7	Bill Musgrave	443	1990	San Diego State
8	Akili Smith	442	1998	Washington
9	Kellen Clemens	437	2004	Washington State
10	Joey Harrington	434	2000	Arizona State

=== Passing touchdowns ===
Career
Rank	Player	TDs	Years
1	Marcus Mariota	105	2012 2013 2014
2	Justin Herbert	95	2016 2017 2018 2019
3	Bo Nix	74	2022 2023
4	Darron Thomas	66	2008 2010 2011
5	Danny O'Neil	62	1991 1992 1993 1994
6	Kellen Clemens	61	2002 2003 2004 2005
7	Bill Musgrave	60	1987 1988 1989 1990
8	Joey Harrington	59	1998 1999 2000 2001
9	Akili Smith	45	1997 1998
10	Chris Miller	42	1983 1984 1985 1986

Single season
Rank	Player	TDs	Year
1	Bo Nix	45	2023
2	Marcus Mariota	42	2014
3	Darron Thomas	33	2011
4	Akili Smith	32	1998
	Marcus Mariota	32	2012
	Justin Herbert	32	2019
7	Marcus Mariota	31	2013
8	Darron Thomas	30	2010
	Dillon Gabriel	30	2024
	Dante Moore	30	2025

Single game
Rank	Player	TDs	Year	Opponent
1	Danny O'Neil	6	1994	Stanford
	Joey Harrington	6	2000	Arizona State
	Darron Thomas	6	2011	Nevada
	Marcus Mariota	6	2012	California
	Vernon Adams	6	2015	USC
	Justin Herbert	6	2016	California
	Bo Nix	6	2023	Arizona State
8	Justin Herbert	5	2019	Nevada
	Marcus Mariota	5	2014	Washington State
	Bo Nix	5	2022	UCLA
	Bo Nix	5	2023	Liberty

== Rushing ==
=== Rushing yards ===
Career
Rank	Player	Yards	Years
1	Royce Freeman	5,621	2014 2015 2016 2017
2	LaMichael James	5,082	2009 2010 2011
3	Kenjon Barner	3,623	2009 2010 2011 2012
4	Derek Loville	3,296	1986 1987 1988 1989
5	Travis Dye	3,111	2018 2019 2020 2021
6	C. J. Verdell	2,929	2018 2019 2020 2021
7	Jonathan Stewart	2,891	2005 2006 2007
8	Terrence Whitehead	2,832	2002 2003 2004 2005
9	Bucky Irving	2,820	2022 2023
10	Sean Burwell	2,758	1990 1991 1992 1993

Single season
Rank	Player	Yards	Year
1	Royce Freeman	1,836	2015
2	LaMichael James	1,805	2011
3	Kenjon Barner	1,767	2012
4	LaMichael James	1,731	2010
5	Jonathan Stewart	1,722	2007
6	LaMichael James	1,546	2009
7	Royce Freeman	1,475	2017
8	Royce Freeman	1,365	2014
9	Saladin McCullough	1,343	1997
10	Travis Dye	1,271	2021

Single game
Rank	Player	Yards	Year	Opponent
1	Kenjon Barner	321	2012	USC
2	LaMichael James	288	2011	Arizona
3	Onterrio Smith	285	2001	Washington State
4	LaMichael James	257	2010	Stanford
	C. J. Verdell	257	2019	Washington State
6	Jonathan Stewart	253	2007	South Florida
7	Jonathan Stewart	251	2007	Washington
8	Bobby Moore	249	1971	Utah
9	Royce Freeman	246	2015	Washington State
10	LaMichael James	239	2010	USC

=== Rushing touchdowns ===
Career
Rank	Player	TDs	Years
1	Royce Freeman	60	2014 2015 2016 2017
2	LaMichael James	53	2009 2010 2011
3	Derek Loville	41	1986 1987 1988 1989
	Kenjon Barner	41	2009 2010 2011 2012
5	Jordan James	31	2022 2023 2024
6	Jeremiah Johnson	30	2005 2006 2007 2008
7	Marcus Mariota	29	2012 2013 2014
8	C. J. Verdell	27	2018 2019 2020 2021
	Jonathan Stewart	27	2005 2006 2007
10	De'Anthony Thomas	26	2011 2012 2013

Single season
Rank	Player	TDs	Year
1	LaMichael James	21	2010
	Kenjon Barner	21	2012
3	LaMichael James	18	2011
	Royce Freeman	18	2014
5	Royce Freeman	17	2015
6	Royce Freeman	16	2017
	Travis Dye	16	2021
8	Saladin McCullough	15	1996
	Marcus Mariota	15	2014
	Jordan James	15	2024
	Jordon Davison	15	2025

Single game
Rank	Player	TDs	Year	Opponent
1	Saladin McCullough	5	1996	Arizona
	Kenjon Barner	5	2012	USC
3	Royce Freeman	4	2014	Washington
	Royce Freeman	4	2017	S.Utah
	Royce Freeman	4	2017	Arizona
	C. J. Verdell	4	2018	Oregon State
	Travis Dye	4	2021	UCLA

== Receiving ==
=== Receptions ===
Career
Rank	Player	Rec	Years
1	Samie Parker	178	2000 2001 2002 2003
	Jeff Maehl	178	2007 2008 2009 2010
3	Jaison Williams	174	2005 2006 2007 2008
4	Keenan Howry	173	1999 2000 2001 2002
5	Tez Johnson	169	2023 2024
6	Cristin McLemore	162	1992 1993 1994 1995
	Demetrius Williams	162	2002 2003 2004 2005
8	Tony Hartley	160	1996 1997 1998 1999
	Troy Franklin	160	2021 2022 2023
10	Bralon Addison	146	2012 2013 2015

Single season
Rank	Player	Rec	Year
1	Tez Johnson	86	2023
2	Tez Johnson	83	2024
3	Troy Franklin	82	2023
4	Samie Parker	77	2003
	Jeff Maehl	77	2010
6	Byron Marshall	74	2014
7	Jaison Williams	68	2006
8	Bob Newland	67	1970
9	Cristin McLemore	64	1995
	Dillon Mitchell	64*	2018

Single game
Rank	Player	Rec	Year	Opponent
1	Samie Parker	16	2003	Minnesota
2	Dillon Mitchell	14	2018	Stanford
3	Demetrius Williams	12	2004	Washington State
	Jeff Maehl	12	2009	Arizona
	Tez Johnson	12	2023	California
	Tez Johnson	12	2024	Idaho
7	Bob Newland	11	1970	Air Force
	Greg Bauer	11	1976	Stanford
	Cristin McLemore	11	1993	Stanford
	Derrick Deadwiler	11	1993	California
	Cristin McLemore	11	1995	Stanford
	Josh Wilcox	11	1995	Penn State
	Marshaun Tucker	11	2000	Arizona State
	Tez Johnson	11	2023	Oregon State
	Tez Johnson	11	2023	Liberty
	Tez Johnson	11	2024	UCLA
	Tez Johnson	11	2024	Penn State

=== Receiving yards ===
Career
Rank	Player	Yards	Years
1	Samie Parker	2,761	2000 2001 2002 2003
2	Tony Hartley	2,744	1996 1997 1998 1999
3	Keenan Howry	2,698	1999 2000 2001 2002
4	Demetrius Williams	2,660	2002 2003 2004 2005
5	Jaison Williams	2,546	2005 2006 2007 2008
6	Cristin McLemore	2,498	1992 1993 1994 1995
7	Troy Franklin	2,483	2021 2022 2023
8	Josh Huff	2,366	2010 2011 2012 2013
9	Jeff Maehl	2,311	2007 2008 2009 2010
10	Terry Obee	2,233	1986 1987 1988 1989

Single season
Rank	Player	Yards	Year
1	Troy Franklin	1,383	2023
2	Dillon Mitchell	1,184	2018
3	Tez Johnson	1,182	2023
4	Josh Huff	1,140	2013
5	Bob Newland	1,123	1970
6	Samie Parker	1,088	2003
7	Jeff Maehl	1,076	2010
8	Pat Johnson	1,072	1997
9	Demetrius Williams	1,059	2005
10	Damon Griffin	1,038	1998

Single game
Rank	Player	Yards	Year	Opponent
1	Tony Hartley	242	1998	Washington
2	Dillon Mitchell	239	2018	Stanford
3	Derrick Deadwiler	234	1993	California
4	Cristin McLemore	230	1993	Stanford
5	Bob Newland	225	1970	Illinois
6	Blake Spence	214	1997	Utah
7	Johnny Johnson III	207	2019	Arizona State
8	Tony Hargain	206	1990	San Diego State
9	Samie Parker	200	2003	Minnesota
10	Pat Johnson	199	1997	Oregon State

=== Receiving touchdowns ===
Career
Rank	Player	TDs	Years
1	Troy Franklin	25	2021 2022 2023
2	Cristin McLemore	24	1992 1993 1994 1995
	Keenan Howry	24	1999 2000 2001 2002
	Jeff Maehl	24	2007 2008 2009 2010
	Josh Huff	24	2010 2011 2012 2013
6	Tony Hartley	22	1996 1997 1998 1999
7	Jaison Williams	21	2005 2006 2007 2008
8	Demetrius Williams	20	2002 2003 2004 2005
	Bralon Addison	20	2012 2013 2015
	Tez Johnson	20	2023 2024

Single season
Rank	Player	TDs	Year
1	Troy Franklin	14	2023
2	Jeff Maehl	12	2010
	Josh Huff	12	2013
4	Bobby Moore	10	1969
	Dillon Mitchell	10	2018
	Tony Hartley	10	1998
	Demetrius Williams	10	2005
	Lavasier Tuinei	10	2011
	Bralon Addison	10	2015
	Tez Johnson	10	2023
	Tez Johnson	10	2024

Single game
Rank	Player	TDs	Year	Opponent
1	Keenan Howry	4	2001	Arizona State
2	Ed Dickson	3	2009	Cal
	Jeff Maehl	3	2010	USC
	Josh Huff	3	2012	Cal
	Josh Huff	3	2013	Oregon State
	Bralon Addison	3	2015	Oregon State
	Juwan Johnson	3	2019	USC

== Total offense ==
Total offense is the sum of passing and rushing statistics. It does not include receiving or returns.

=== Total offense yards ===
Career
Rank	Player	Yards	Years
1	Marcus Mariota	13,033	2012 2013 2014
2	Justin Herbert	11,101	2016 2017 2018 2019
3	Bo Nix	8,845	2022 2023
4	Bill Musgrave	8,140	1987 1988 1989 1990
5	Danny O'Neil	8,124	1991 1992 1993 1994
6	Kellen Clemens	8,090	2002 2003 2004 2005
7	Joey Harrington	7,121	1998 1999 2000 2001
8	Chris Miller	6,841	1983 1984 1985 1986
9	Darron Thomas	6,629	2008 2010 2011
10	Dennis Dixon	6,337	2004 2005 2006 2007

Single season
Rank	Player	Yards	Year
1	Marcus Mariota	5,224	2014
2	Bo Nix	4,742	2023
3	Marcus Mariota	4,380	2013
4	Bo Nix	4,103	2022
5	Dillon Gabriel	4,006	2024
6	Akili Smith	3,947	1998
7	Dante Moore	3,721	2025
8	Anthony Brown	3,647	2021
9	Justin Herbert	3,521	2019
10	Marcus Mariota	3,429	2012

Single game
Rank	Player	Yards	Year	Opponent
1	Justin Herbert	512	2016	Arizona State
2	Bill Musgrave	498	1989	BYU
3	Marcus Mariota	483	2013	Tennessee
4	Kellen Clemens	473	2004	Washington State
5	Bo Nix	472	2022	California
6	Bill Musgrave	468	1990	San Diego State
7	Bo Nix	458	2022	Washington State
8	Akili Smith	457	1998	Colorado
9	Akili Smith	456	1998	Washington
10	Kellen Clemens	447	2005	Washington

=== Touchdowns responsible for ===
"Touchdowns responsible for" is the NCAA's official term for combined passing and rushing touchdowns.

Career
Rank	Player	TDs	Years
1	Marcus Mariota	134	2012 2013 2014
2	Bo Nix	94	2022 2023
3	Joey Harrington	77	1998 1999 2000 2001
	Justin Herbert	77	2016 2017 2018 2019
5	Darron Thomas	75	2008 2010 2011
6	Danny O'Neil	67	1991 1992 1993 1994
	Kellen Clemens	67	2002 2003 2004 2005
8	Bill Musgrave	64	1987 1988 1989 1990
9	Royce Freeman	61	2014 2015 2016 2017
10	LaMichael James	53	2009 2010 2011

Single season
Rank	Player	TDs	Year
1	Marcus Mariota	57	2014
2	Bo Nix	51	2023
3	Bo Nix	43	2022
4	Marcus Mariota	40	2013
5	Marcus Mariota	37	2012
	Dillon Gabriel	37	2024
7	Justin Herbert	36	2019
	Akili Smith	36	1998
	Darron Thomas	36	2011
10	Darron Thomas	35	2010

Single game
Rank	Player	TDs	Year	Opponent
1	Marcus Mariota	7	2013	Colorado
2	Darron Thomas	6	2011	Nevada
	Marcus Mariota	6	2012	California
	Vernon Adams	6	2015	USC
	Justin Herbert	6	2016	California
	Bo Nix	6	2022	California
	Bo Nix	6	2023	California
	Bo Nix	6	2023	Arizona State
9	Saladin McCullough	5	1996	Arizona
	Dennis Dixon	5	2007	Stanford
	Kenjon Barner	5	2012	USC
	Marcus Mariota	5	2014	Arizona
	C. J. Verdell	5	2018	Oregon State
	Bo Nix	5	2022	Eastern Washington
	Bo Nix	5	2022	BYU
	Bo Nix	5	2022	UCLA
	Bo Nix	5	2023	Liberty
	Dante Moore	5	2025	James Madison

== Defense ==
=== Interceptions ===
Career
Rank	Player	Ints	Years
1	George Shaw	18	1951 1952 1953 1954
2	Jake Leicht	17	1945 1946 1947
	Jairus Byrd	17	2006 2007 2008
4	Chris Oldham	15	1987 1988 1989
5	Bill Drake	14	1969 1970 1971
6	Mario Clark	13	1972 1973 1974 1975
	Steve Smith	13	1998 1999 2000 2001
	Aaron Gipson	13	2002 2003 2004 2005
	Erick Dargan	13	2011 2012 2013 2014

Single season
Rank	Player	Ints	Year
1	George Shaw	13	1951
2	Jake Leicht	10	1945
3	Steve Smith	9	2001
4	Woodley Lewis	8	1949
	Chris Oldham	8	1989
6	Bill Drake	7	1971
	Ed Hulbert	7	1986
	Herman O’Berry	7	1992
	Aaron Gipson	7	2005
	Jairus Byrd	7	2007
	Erick Dargan	7	2014

Single game
Rank	Player	Ints	Year	Opponent
1	Jake Leicht	3	1945	Washington State
	Jake Leicht	3	1945	California
	Woodley Lewis	3	1949	Idaho
	George Shaw	3	1951	Arizona
	George Shaw	3	1951	Idaho
	Dick James	3	1955	Arizona
	Ed Hulbert	3	1986	California
	Anthony Newman	3	1986	Oregon State
	Daryle Smith	3	1990	BYU
	Herman O’Berry	3	1992	California
	Steve Smith	3	2001	USC
	Steve Smith	3	2001	Colorado

=== Tackles ===
Career
Rank	Player	Tackles	Years
1	Tom Graham	433	1969 1970 1971
2	Bruce Beekley	429	1976 1977 1978
3	Joe Farwell	393	1989 1990 1991 1992
4	Troy Dye	391	2016 2017 2018 2019
5	Patrick Chung	384	2005 2006 2007 2008
6	Darrell Mehl	373	1973 1974 1975 1976
7	Kevin Mitchell	366	2000 2001 2002 2003
8	Chris Cosgrove	354	1978 1979 1981 1982
9	Steve Rennie	336	1969 1970 1971
10	Chad Cota	336	1991 1992 1993 1994

Single season
Rank	Player	Tackles	Year
1	Tom Graham	206	1969
2	Bruce Beekley	190	1978
3	Steve Rennie	184	1971
4	Bruce Beekley	170	1977
5	Tom Graham	154	1970
6	Willie Blasher	147	1978
7	Chris Cosgrove	140	1979
8	Bryce Boettcher	136	2025
9	Darrell Mehl	131	1974
	Mark Kearns	131	1989

Single game
Rank	Player	Tackles	Year	Opponent
1	Lerry Wilson	22	1983	Houston
2	Dan Ralph	21	1983	Oregon State
3	Joe Farwell	20	1991	Oregon State
	Michael Clay	20	2012	Stanford
5	Todd Welch	19	1984	Oregon State
	Scott Whitney	19	1988	Arizona State
	Chris Vandiver	19	1998	Stanford

=== Sacks ===
Career
Rank	Player	Sacks	Years
1	Nick Reed	29.5	2005 2006 2007 2008
2	Ernest Jones	29.0	1990 1991 1992 1993
3	Saul Patu	26.5	1997 1998 1999 2000
4	Devan Long	24.5	2002 2003 2004 2005
5	Matt LaBounty	23.5	1988 1989 1990 1991
6	Kenny Rowe	23.5	2007 2008 2009 2010
7	Steve Baack	19.0	1981 1982 1983
	Matt Brock	19.0	1985 1986 1987 1988
	Reggie Jordan	19.0	1993 1994 1995 1996
	Kayvon Thibodeaux	19.0	2019 2020 2021

Single season
Rank	Player	Sacks	Year
1	Ernest Jones	13.0	1993
	Nick Reed	13.0	2008
3	Mike Walter	12.0	1982
	Nick Reed	12.0	2007
5	Devan Long	11.5	2003
	Kenny Rowe	11.5	2009
7	Ernest Jones	11.0	1992
	Saul Patu	11.0	2000
	Anthony Trucks	11.0	2005
10	Peter Brantley	10.5	1989
	Matayo Uiagalelei	10.5	2024

== Kicking ==
=== Field goals made ===
Career
Rank	Player	FGs	Years
1	Aidan Schneider	51	2014 2015 2016 2017
2	Jared Siegel	49	2001 2002 2003 2004
	Camden Lewis	49	2019 2020 2021 2022 2023
4	Gregg McCallum	45	1989 1990 1991
5	Tommy Thompson	37	1990 1991 1992 1993
6	Joshua Smith	36	1995 1996 1997
7	Paul Martinez	34	2003 2004 2005 2006
8	Nathan Villegas	33	1998 1999
	Atticus Sappington	33	2024 2025
10	Matt MacLeod	32	1984 1985 1986
	Kirk Dennis	32	1987 1988
	Matt Evensen	32	2005 2006 2007 2008

Single season
Rank	Player	FGs	Year
1	Gregg McCallum	24	1989
2	Aidan Schneider	22	2015
3	Tommy Thompson	21	1992
4	Nathan Villegas	20	1998
	Jared Siegel	20	2002
6	Paul Martinez	19	2005
	Atticus Sappington	19	2025
8	Kirk Dennis	17	1988
9	Tommy Thompson	16	1993
	Joshua Smith	16	1995
	Matt Evensen	16	2007
	Morgan Flint	16	2009

Single game
Rank	Player	FGs	Year	Opponent
1	Paul Martinez	6	2005	Montana
2	Atticus Sappington	4	2025	Washington
	Aidan Schneider	4	2016	ASU
	Aidan Schneider	4	2015	GA.ST
	Morgan Flint	4	2009	USC
	Matt Evensen	4	2009	Purdue
7	Gage Hurych	3	2026	Nebraska
	Atticus Sappington	3	2025	Texas Tech
	Atticus Sappington	3	2025	Iowa
	Atticus Sappington	3	2024	Wisconsin
	Camden Lewis	3	2023	Texas Tech
	Camden Lewis	3	2022	Washington State
	Camden Lewis	3	2019	Utah
	Aidan Schneider	3	2014	Arizona
	Matt Wogan	3	2013	Texas
	Morgan Flint	3	2008	osu
	Jared Siegel	3	2003	Minnesota

=== Field goal percentage ===
Career
Rank	Player	FG%	Years
1	Aidan Schneider	85.0%	2014 2015 2016 2017
2	Atticus Sappington	82.5%	2024 2025
	Nathan Villegas	82.5%	1998 1999
4	Morgan Flint	82.1%	2006 2007 2008 2009
5	Matt Wogan	77.8%	2013 2014
6	Matt MacLeod	74.4%	1984 1985 1986
7	Paul Martinez	73.9%	2003 2004 2005 2006
8	Gregg McCallum	72.6%	1989 1990 1991
9	Camden Lewis	72.1%	2019 2020 2021 2022 2023
10	Jared Siegel	71.0%	2001 2002 2003 2004

Single season
Rank	Player	FG%	Year
1	Matt MacLeod	100.0%	1985
2	Aidan Schneider	91.7%	2014
	Aidan Schneider	91.7%	2015
4	Nathan Villegas	90.9%	1998
5	Camden Lewis	87.5%	2022
	Atticus Sappington	87.5%	2024
7	Morgan Flint	84.2%	2009
8	Gregg McCallum	83.3%	1990
	Jared Siegel	83.3%	2002
10	Camden Lewis	81.3%	2021
