= List of California Golden Bears in the NFL draft =

This is a list of California Golden Bears football players in the NFL draft.

== Key ==
| B | Back | K | Kicker | NT | Nose tackle |
| C | Center | LB | Linebacker | FB | Fullback |
| DB | Defensive back | P | Punter | HB | Halfback |
| DE | Defensive end | QB | Quarterback | WR | Wide receiver |
| DT | Defensive tackle | RB | Running back | G | Guard |
| E | End | T | Offensive tackle | TE | Tight end |

== Selections ==
| Year | Round | Pick | Player | Team | Position |
|---|---|---|---|---|---|
| 1936 | 6 | 47 | Larry Lutz | Boston Redskins | T |
| 1938 | 3 | 24 | Sam Chapman | Washington Redskins | B |
| 1938 | 4 | 27 | John Meek | Philadelphia Eagles | B |
| 1938 | 4 | 30 | Bob Herwig | Chicago Cardinals | C |
| 1938 | 6 | 43 | Perry Schwartz | Brooklyn Dodgers | E |
| 1939 | 4 | 30 | Vic Bottari | Brooklyn Dodgers | B |
| 1939 | 6 | 48 | Dave Anderson | Washington Redskins | B |
| 1939 | 18 | 170 | Will Dolman | New York Giants | E |
| 1940 | 6 | 50 | Lou Smith | New York Giants | B |
| 1940 | 11 | 97 | Lee Artoe | Chicago Bears | T |
| 1941 | 14 | 124 | Bill Elmore | Los Angeles Rams | B |
| 1942 | 5 | 34 | Bob Reinhard | Chicago Cardinals | T |
| 1943 | 8 | 63 | John Ferguson | Brooklyn Dodgers | E |
| 1943 | 9 | 79 | Jim Jurkovich | Chicago Bears | B |
| 1943 | 31 | 293 | Brunel Christensen | Green Bay Packers | T |
| 1944 | 23 | 237 | Bill Reinhard | Washington Redskins | B |
| 1945 | 5 | 37 | Roger Harding | Los Angeles Rams | C |
| 1945 | 8 | 67 | John Dodds | Brooklyn Dodgers | G |
| 1945 | 16 | 164 | Harry Pieper | Green Bay Packers | C |
| 1946 | 6 | 50 | Newell Oestreich | Los Angeles Rams | B |
| 1946 | 7 | 54 | Wendell Beard | Chicago Bears | T |
| 1946 | 29 | 278 | Bill Agnew | Detroit Lions | B |
| 1946 | 31 | 294 | Sarkis Takesian | Washington Redskins | B |
| 1947 | 14 | 125 | Jim Turner | Chicago Bears | T |
| 1947 | 23 | 211 | Ron Sockolov | Green Bay Packers | T |
| 1947 | 25 | 233 | Bob Dal Porto | Los Angeles Rams | B |
| 1947 | 25 | 235 | John Cunningham | Chicago Bears | E |
| 1948 | 19 | 173 | Bob Hileman | Chicago Bears | C |
| 1948 | 23 | 213 | Jack Swaner | Philadelphia Eagles | B |
| 1948 | 29 | 272 | Bud Van Deren | Chicago Bears | E |
| 1949 | 7 | 67 | Jon Baker | Los Angeles Rams | LB |
| 1949 | 15 | 148 | Gene Frassetto | Washington Redskins | T |
| 1949 | 24 | 238 | Jim Cullom | Washington Redskins | G |
| 1950 | 10 | 127 | Bob Celeri | San Francisco 49ers | B |
| 1950 | 17 | 214 | Jim Cullom | Washington Redskins | G |
| 1950 | 19 | 245 | Forest Klein | San Francisco 49ers | G |
| 1950 | 26 | 339 | Rod Franz | Philadelphia Eagles | G |
| 1950 | 29 | 373 | Bill Montagne | Chicago Cardinals | B |
| 1951 | 2 | 17 | Pete Schabarum | San Francisco 49ers | B |
| 1951 | 12 | 137 | Jim Monachino | San Francisco 49ers | B |
| 1951 | 19 | 231 | Ray Solari | Cleveland Browns | G |
| 1952 | 1 | 2 | Les Richter | Boston Yanks | LB |
| 1952 | 6 | 65 | Dick Lemmon | Philadelphia Eagles | B |
| 1952 | 7 | 81 | Don Robison | San Francisco 49ers | B |
| 1952 | 11 | 131 | Charlie Harris | New York Giants | C |
| 1952 | 17 | 203 | Bob Karpe | New York Giants | T |
| 1952 | 18 | 211 | Ed Bartlett | Washington Redskins | E |
| 1952 | 24 | 286 | Ralph Kreuger | San Francisco 49ers | T |
| 1952 | 29 | 343 | John Pappa | Washington Redskins | B |
| 1952 | 29 | 347 | Jim Dillon | New York Giants | B |
| 1952 | 29 | 349 | Gerry Perry | Los Angeles Rams | T |
| 1953 | 1 | 4 | Johnny Olszewski | Chicago Cardinals | B |
| 1953 | 3 | 34 | Don Johnson | Philadelphia Eagles | B |
| 1953 | 17 | 198 | Bob Beal | Chicago Bears | E |
| 1953 | 19 | 218 | Bill Powell | Baltimore Colts | B |
| 1954 | 8 | 86 | Paul Larson | Chicago Cardinals | B |
| 1954 | 14 | 167 | Sammy Williams | San Francisco 49ers | B |
| 1954 | 23 | 274 | Don Marks | Los Angeles Rams | B |
| 1955 | 4 | 45 | Matt Hazeltine | San Francisco 49ers | C |
| 1955 | 12 | 139 | Jim Hanifan | Los Angeles Rams | E |
| 1955 | 16 | 183 | Hal Norris | Washington Redskins | B |
| 1955 | 19 | 226 | John Garzoli | San Francisco 49ers | T |
| 1956 | 4 | 48 | Jim Carmichael | Los Angeles Rams | E |
| 1956 | 28 | 328 | Jerry Drew | San Francisco 49ers | B |
| 1957 | 6 | 67 | Harley Martin | Cleveland Browns | T |
| 1958 | 2 | 17 | Proverb Jacobs | Philadelphia Eagles | T |
| 1959 | 19 | 209 | Joe Kapp | Washington Redskins | QB |
| 1959 | 26 | 310 | Frank Doretti | New York Giants | C |
| 1960 | 8 | 85 | Wayne Crow | St. Louis Cardinals | B |
| 1962 | 11 | 145 | Bob Willis | Pittsburgh Steelers | E |
| 1962 | 13 | 176 | George Pierovich | San Francisco 49ers | B |
| 1962 | 19 | 266 | Jerry Scattini | Green Bay Packers | B |
| 1965 | 1 | 5 | Craig Morton | Dallas Cowboys | QB |
| 1965 | 8 | 106 | Stan Dzura | Los Angeles Rams | T |
| 1965 | 13 | 173 | Jack Schraub | Dallas Cowboys | E |
| 1966 | 5 | 68 | Dan Berry | Philadelphia Eagles | RB |
| 1966 | 8 | 121 | Dan Goich | St. Louis Cardinals | E |
| 1967 | 8 | 197 | John Beasley | Minnesota Vikings | WR |
| 1968 | 16 | 415 | John Frantz | Buffalo Bills | C |
| 1969 | 2 | 39 | Ed White | Minnesota Vikings | G |
| 1969 | 4 | 95 | Mike McCaffrey | Minnesota Vikings | LB |
| 1969 | 15 | 390 | Wayne Stewart | New York Jets | TE |
| 1969 | 17 | 418 | Paul Williams | Atlanta Falcons | RB |
| 1970 | 16 | 398 | Gary Fowler | St. Louis Cardinals | RB |
| 1971 | 7 | 159 | Phil Croyle | Houston Oilers | LB |
| 1971 | 12 | 296 | Greg Hendren | Green Bay Packers | G |
| 1971 | 15 | 386 | Bob Richards | Miami Dolphins | G |
| 1972 | 1 | 2 | Sherman White | Cincinnati Bengals | DE |
| 1973 | 3 | 77 | Bob Kampa | Buffalo Bills | DT |
| 1973 | 8 | 192 | Loren Toews | Pittsburgh Steelers | LB |
| 1973 | 9 | 231 | Steve Sweeney | Oakland Raiders | TE |
| 1974 | 12 | 289 | Sam Williams | San Diego Chargers | DB |
| 1974 | 12 | 290 | Jeff Sevy | Chicago Bears | DT |
| 1975 | 1 | 1 | Steve Bartkowski | Atlanta Falcons | QB |
| 1975 | 9 | 228 | Dallas Hickman | Washington Redskins | DE |
| 1975 | 11 | 281 | Howard Strickland | Los Angeles Rams | RB |
| 1976 | 1 | 3 | Chuck Muncie | New Orleans Saints | RB |
| 1976 | 4 | 100 | Steve Rivera | San Francisco 49ers | WR |
| 1976 | 16 | 434 | Jack Harrison | San Diego Chargers | G |
| 1977 | 1 | 15 | Ted Albrecht | Chicago Bears | T |
| 1977 | 2 | 33 | Wesley Walker | New York Jets | WR |
| 1977 | 5 | 115 | Fred Besana | Buffalo Bills | QB |
| 1977 | 5 | 139 | Jeff Barnes | Oakland Raiders | LB |
| 1977 | 11 | 297 | Phil Heck | Denver Broncos | LB |
| 1977 | 12 | 332 | Greg Peters | Dallas Cowboys | G |
| 1978 | 6 | 165 | Jesse Thompson | Detroit Lions | WR |
| 1978 | 8 | 206 | Jim Breech | Detroit Lions | K |
| 1978 | 8 | 212 | George Freitas | Chicago Bears | TE |
| 1978 | 12 | 317 | Leo Bidermann | Cleveland Browns | T |
| 1979 | 4 | 109 | Ralph DeLoach | Dallas Cowboys | DE |
| 1979 | 9 | 228 | Bob Rozier | St. Louis Cardinals | DE |
| 1980 | 2 | 52 | Daryle Skaugstad | Houston Oilers | DT |
| 1980 | 5 | 122 | Paul Jones | Minnesota Vikings | RB |
| 1980 | 7 | 185 | Joe Rose | Miami Dolphins | TE |
| 1980 | 9 | 243 | Greg Bracelin | Denver Broncos | LB |
| 1981 | 1 | 6 | Rich Campbell | Green Bay Packers | QB |
| 1981 | 10 | 273 | Pat Graham | Green Bay Packers | DT |
| 1981 | 11 | 288 | Holden Smith | Baltimore Colts | WR |
| 1983 | 2 | 30 | Harvey Salem | Houston Oilers | T |
| 1983 | 3 | 68 | Reggie Camp | Cleveland Browns | DE |
| 1983 | 4 | 105 | Wes Howell | New York Jets | TE |
| 1983 | 10 | 269 | Tim Lucas | St. Louis Cardinals | LB |
| 1983 | 12 | 335 | John Tuggle | New York Giants | RB |
| 1984 | 1 | 20 | David Lewis | Detroit Lions | TE |
| 1984 | 2 | 44 | Ron Rivera | Chicago Bears | LB |
| 1984u | 3 | 66 | Byron Smith | Indianapolis Colts | DT |
| 1984u | 3 | 72 | John Sullivan | Green Bay Packers | DB |
| 1985 | 12 | 335 | Ray Noble | Miami Dolphins | DB |
| 1987 | 5 | 122 | Hardy Nickerson | Pittsburgh Steelers | LB |
| 1987 | 6 | 168 | Doug Riesenberg | New York Giants | T |
| 1988 | 1 | 12 | Ken Harvey | Phoenix Cardinals | LB |
| 1988 | 9 | 229 | Scott Tabor | Los Angeles Raiders | P |
| 1988 | 9 | 232 | Brian Bedford | Dallas Cowboys | WR |
| 1989 | 2 | 54 | Dave Zawatson | Chicago Bears | T |
| 1989 | 4 | 108 | Darryl Ingram | Minnesota Vikings | TE |
| 1989 | 5 | 138 | Natu Tuatagaloa | Cincinnati Bengals | DT |
| 1989 | 6 | 167 | Steve Hendrickson | San Francisco 49ers | LB |
| 1990 | 4 | 84 | Troy Taylor | New York Jets | QB |
| 1991 | 3 | 64 | James Richards | Dallas Cowboys | G |
| 1991 | 6 | 147 | Rhett Hall | Tampa Bay Buccaneers | DT |
| 1991 | 9 | 237 | Anthony Wallace | New Orleans Saints | RB |
| 1991 | 9 | 244 | Robbie Keen | Kansas City Chiefs | K |
| 1991 | 11 | 302 | Ernie Rogers | Miami Dolphins | G |
| 1992 | 2 | 49 | Troy Auzenne | Chicago Bears | T |
| 1992 | 7 | 183 | David Wilson | Minnesota Vikings | DB |
| 1992 | 8 | 222 | Mike Pawlawski | Tampa Bay Buccaneers | QB |
| 1992 | 10 | 277 | Steve Gordon | New England Patriots | C |
| 1993 | 1 | 16 | Sean Dawkins | Indianapolis Colts | WR |
| 1993 | 3 | 73 | Russell White | Los Angeles Rams | RB |
| 1993 | 6 | 145 | Chidi Ahanotu | Tampa Bay Buccaneers | DT |
| 1994 | 1 | 19 | Todd Steussie | Minnesota Vikings | T |
| 1994 | 2 | 32 | Eric Mahlum | Indianapolis Colts | G |
| 1994 | 3 | 85 | Doug Brien | San Francisco 49ers | K |
| 1994 | 3 | 103 | Eric Zomalt | Philadelphia Eagles | DB |
| 1994 | 5 | 141 | Issac Booth | Cleveland Browns | DB |
| 1995 | 4 | 119 | Dave Barr | Philadelphia Eagles | QB |
| 1995 | 5 | 164 | Jerrott Willard | Kansas City Chiefs | LB |
| 1995 | 6 | 176 | Brian Thure | Washington Redskins | T |
| 1996 | 1 | 12 | Regan Upshaw | Tampa Bay Buccaneers | DE |
| 1996 | 1 | 16 | Duane Clemons | Minnesota Vikings | DE |
| 1996 | 2 | 40 | Je'Rod Cherry | New Orleans Saints | DB |
| 1996 | 5 | 160 | Iheanyi Uwaezuoke | San Francisco 49ers | WR |
| 1996 | 7 | 211 | Ben Lynch | Kansas City Chiefs | C |
| 1997 | 1 | 13 | Tony Gonzalez | Kansas City Chiefs | TE |
| 1997 | 1 | 19 | Tarik Glenn | Indianapolis Colts | T |
| 1997 | 14 | 110 | Pat Barnes | Kansas City Chiefs | QB |
| 1998 | 2 | 58 | Jeremy Newberry | San Francisco 49ers | C |
| 1998 | 4 | 112 | Brandon Whiting | Philadelphia Eagles | DT |
| 1998 | 6 | 169 | Bobby Shaw | Seattle Seahawks | WR |
| 1998 | 7 | 223 | Tarik Smith | Dallas Cowboys | RB |
| 1999 | 3 | 76 | Marquis Smith | Cleveland Browns | DB |
| 1999 | 4 | 97 | John Welbourn | Philadelphia Eagles | G |
| 1999 | 4 | 102 | Dameane Douglas | Oakland Raiders | WR |
| 1999 | 5 | 149 | John McLaughlin | Tampa Bay Buccaneers | DE |
| 2000 | 1 | 15 | Deltha O'Neal | Denver Broncos | DB |
| 2000 | 6 | 192 | John Romero | Philadelphia Eagles | C |
| 2000 | 7 | 215 | Sekou Sanyika | Arizona Cardinals | LB |
| 2000 | 7 | 217 | Jeremiah Parker | New York Giants | DE |
| 2001 | 1 | 7 | Andre Carter | San Francisco 49ers | DE |
| 2001 | 4 | 120 | Nick Harris | Denver Broncos | P |
| 2002 | 2 | 53 | Langston Walker | Oakland Raiders | T |
| 2002 | 5 | 143 | Scott Fujita | Kansas City Chiefs | LB |
| 2003 | 1 | 19 | Kyle Boller | Baltimore Ravens | QB |
| 2003 | 1 | 31 | Nnamdi Asomugha | Oakland Raiders | DB |
| 2003 | 6 | 184 | Scott Tercero | St. Louis Rams | G |
| 2003 | 7 | 239 | Tully Banta-Cain | New England Patriots | DE |
| 2004 | 5 | 151 | Mark Wilson | Washington Redskins | T |
| 2004 | 7 | 208 | Adimchinobe Echemandu | Cleveland Browns | RB |
| 2005 | 1 | 24 | Aaron Rodgers | Green Bay Packers | QB |
| 2005 | 2 | 44 | J. J. Arrington | Arizona Cardinals | RB |
| 2005 | 4 | 118 | Chase Lyman | New Orleans Saints | WR |
| 2005 | 4 | 135 | Matt Giordano | Indianapolis Colts | DB |
| 2005 | 6 | 212 | Ryan Riddle | Oakland Raiders | DE |
| 2006 | 5 | 136 | Ryan O'Callaghan | New England Patriots | T |
| 2006 | 6 | 201 | Marvin Philip | Pittsburgh Steelers | C |
| 2006 | 7 | 248 | Aaron Merz | Buffalo Bills | G |
| 2007 | 1 | 12 | Marshawn Lynch | Buffalo Bills | RB |
| 2007 | 3 | 85 | Brandon Mebane | Seattle Seahawks | DT |
| 2007 | 3 | 95 | Daymeion Hughes | Indianapolis Colts | DB |
| 2007 | 6 | 192 | Desmond Bishop | Green Bay Packers | LB |
| 2008 | 2 | 49 | DeSean Jackson | Philadelphia Eagles | WR |
| 2008 | 3 | 85 | Craig Stevens | Tennessee Titans | TE |
| 2008 | 3 | 98 | Thomas DeCoud | Atlanta Falcons | DB |
| 2008 | 4 | 126 | Lavelle Hawkins | Tennessee Titans | WR |
| 2008 | 6 | 184 | Mike Gibson | Philadelphia Eagles | G |
| 2008 | 7 | 233 | Justin Forsett | Seattle Seahawks | RB |
| 2009 | 1 | 21 | Alex Mack | Cleveland Browns | C |
| 2009 | 7 | 235 | Zack Follett | Detroit Lions | LB |
| 2009 | 7 | 248 | Cameron Morrah | Seattle Seahawks | TE |
| 2010 | 1 | 10 | Tyson Alualu | Jacksonville Jaguars | DE |
| 2010 | 1 | 30 | Jahvid Best | Detroit Lions | RB |
| 2010 | 7 | 225 | Syd'Quan Thompson | Denver Broncos | DB |
| 2011 | 1 | 24 | Cameron Jordan | New Orleans Saints | DE |
| 2011 | 2 | 56 | Shane Vereen | New England Patriots | RB |
| 2011 | 3 | 93 | Chris Conte | Chicago Bears | DB |
| 2011 | 6 | 189 | Mike Mohamed | Denver Broncos | LB |
| 2012 | 2 | 37 | Mitchell Schwartz | Cleveland Browns | T |
| 2012 | 2 | 46 | Mychal Kendricks | Philadelphia Eagles | LB |
| 2012 | 3 | 70 | Bryan Anger | Jacksonville Jaguars | P |
| 2012 | 5 | 166 | Marvin Jones | Cincinnati Bengals | WR |
| 2012 | 7 | 216 | D. J. Campbell | Carolina Panthers | DB |
| 2012 | 7 | 219 | Trevor Guyton | Minnesota Vikings | DE |
| 2013 | 3 | 76 | Keenan Allen | San Diego Chargers | WR |
| 2013 | 4 | 107 | Brian Schwenke | Tennessee Titans | C |
| 2013 | 5 | 145 | Steve Williams | San Diego Chargers | DB |
| 2013 | 7 | 247 | Marc Anthony | Baltimore Ravens | DB |
| 2014 | 3 | 98 | Richard Rodgers | Green Bay Packers | TE |
| 2014 | 4 | 126 | Khairi Fortt | New Orleans Saints | LB |
| 2016 | 1 | 1 | Jared Goff | Los Angeles Rams | QB |
| 2016 | 5 | 163 | Trevor Davis | Green Bay Packers | WR |
| 2016 | 7 | 237 | Daniel Lasco | New Orleans Saints | RB |
| 2016 | 7 | 243 | Kenny Lawler | Seattle Seahawks | WR |
| 2017 | 3 | 87 | Davis Webb | New York Giants | QB |
| 2017 | 4 | 141 | Chad Hansen | New York Jets | WR |
| 2017 | 7 | 241 | Khalfani Muhammad | Tennessee Titans | RB |
| 2018 | 7 | 225 | Devante Downs | Minnesota Vikings | LB |
| 2018 | 7 | 232 | James Looney | Green Bay Packers | DE |
| 2020 | 3 | 68 | Ashtyn Davis | New York Jets | DB |
| 2020 | 4 | 134 | Jaylinn Hawkins | Atlanta Falcons | DB |
| 2020 | 6 | 202 | Evan Weaver | Arizona Cardinals | LB |
| 2021 | 4 | 125 | Camryn Bynum | Minnesota Vikings | DB |
| 2022 | 7 | 224 | Cameron Goode | Miami Dolphins | LB |
| 2022 | 7 | 254 | Elijah Hicks | Chicago Bears | DB |
| 2023 | 5 | 158 | Daniel Scott | Indianapolis Colts | DB |
| 2024 | 6 | 198 | Patrick McMorris | Miami Dolphins | DB |
| 2025 | 3 | 85 | Nohl Williams | Kansas City Chiefs | DB |
| 2025 | 4 | 106 | Craig Woodson | New England Patriots | S |
| 2025 | 4 | 129 | Teddye Buchanan | Baltimore Ravens | LB |
| 2025 | 6 | 183 | Marcus Harris | Tennessee Titans | CB |
| 2026 | 5 | 175 | Hezekiah Masses | Las Vegas Raiders | CB |

== Notable undrafted players ==
Note: No drafts held before 1920

| Debut Year | Player | Position | Debut Team | Notes |
|---|---|---|---|---|
| 1968 | Jim Fetherston | LB | San Diego Chargers | — |
| 1973 | Clarence Duren | DB | St. Louis Cardinals | — |
| 1973 | Ray Wersching | K | San Diego Chargers | — |
| 1974 | Scott Stringer | DB | St. Louis Cardinals | — |
| 1975 | Bob Swenson | LB | Denver Broncos | — |
| 1977 | Tom Newton | RB | New York Jets | — |
| 1977 | James Reed | LB | Philadelphia Eagles | — |
| 1979 | Dan Melville | P | San Francisco 49ers | — |
| 1979 | Mike O’Brien | DB | Seattle Seahawks | — |
| 1980 | Stan Holloway | LB | New Orleans Saints | — |
| 1981 | Matt Bouza | WR | San Francisco 49ers | — |
| 1981 | Mick Luckhurst | K | Atlanta Falcons | — |
| 1982 | Floyd Eddings | WR | New York Giants | — |
| 1983 | Rich Dixon | LB | Atlanta Falcons | — |
| 1983 | Rich Stachowski | NT | Denver Broncos | — |
| 1985 | Gale Gilbert | QB | Seattle Seahawks | — |
| 1986 | Keith Kartz | C | Seattle Seahawks | — |
| 1986 | Gary Plummer | LB | San Diego Chargers | — |
| 1986 | Miles Turpin | LB | Green Bay Packers | — |
| 1987 | Sidney Johnson | CB | Kansas City Chiefs | — |
| 1987 | Mike Rusinek | NT | Cleveland Browns | — |
| 1987 | Chuck Steele | C | Detroit Lions | — |
| 1992 | Brian Treggs | WR | Seattle Seahawks | — |
| 1993 | Mack Travis | DT | Detroit Lions | — |
| 1994 | David Binn | LS | San Diego Chargers | — |
| 1994 | Mike Caldwell | WR | New Orleans Saints | — |
| 1997 | Ryan Longwell | K | San Francisco 49ers | — |
| 1998 | Kato Serwanga | CB | New England Patriots | — |
| 2000 | Jerry DeLoach | DT | Washington Redskins | — |
| 2001 | Chidi Iwuoma | CB | Detroit Lions | — |
| 2003 | Mark Jenson | K | Detroit Lions | — |
| 2005 | Lorenzo Alexander | LB | Carolina Panthers | — |
| 2005 | L. P. Ladouceur | LS | New Orleans Saints | — |
| 2008 | Robert Jordan | WR | San Francisco 49ers | — |
| 2008 | Brian de la Puente | C | San Francisco 49ers | — |
| 2009 | Nick Sundberg | LS | Carolina Panthers | — |
| 2010 | Verran Tucker | WR | Dallas Cowboys | — |
| 2011 | Jeremy Ross | WR | New England Patriots | — |
| 2015 | Chris Harper | WR | New England Patriots | — |
| 2019 | Jordan Kunaszyk | LB | Carolina Panthers | — |
| 2022 | Chase Garbers | QB | Las Vegas Raiders | — |
| 2026 | Brent Austin | CB | Denver Broncos | — |
| 2026 | T.J. Bollers | DT | Jacksonville Jaguars | — |
| 2026 | Jacob De Jesus | WR | Kansas City Chiefs | — |
| 2026 | Aidan Keanaaina | DL | Detroit Lions | — |
