= List of Arizona Wildcats football All-Americans =

The Arizona Wildcats college football team competes as part of the National Collegiate Athletic Association (NCAA) Division I Football Bowl Subdivision (FBS), and represents the University of Arizona in the South Division of the Pac-12 Conference (Pac-12). All-America selections are individual player recognitions made after each season when numerous publications release lists of their ideal team. The NCAA recognizes five All-America lists: the Associated Press (AP), American Football Coaches Association (AFCA), the Football Writers Association of America (FWAA), Sporting News (SN), and the Walter Camp Football Foundation (WCFF). In order for an honoree to earn a "consensus" selection, he must be selected as first team in three of the five lists recognized by the NCAA, and "unanimous" selections must be selected as first team in all five lists.

Since the establishment of the team in 1894, Arizona has had 29 players honored a total of 34 times as First Team All-America for their performance on the field of play. Included in these selections are 8 consensus selections, 2 of which were unanimous selections earned by Ka'Deem Carey in the 2012 season and 2013 season and Scooby Wright III in the 2015 season.

== Key ==
^{†}	Consensus selection
^{‡}	Unanimous selection

=== Selectors ===
AAB	All-America Board	AFCA	AS	Athlon Sports	American Football Coaches Association	AP	Associated Press				
CBSS	CBS Sports	CO	Collier's Weekly	CNNSI	CNN/Sports Illustrated	CP	Central Press Association	CSW	College Sports Writers	CFN	College Football News
DW	Davis J. Walsh										
ES	ESPN	Ed Sullivan	FN	The Football News	FWAA	Football Writers Association of America	FS	Fox Sports			
INS	International News Service										
KCS	Kansas City Star										
LAT	Los Angeles Times	LIB	Liberty Magazine	LIN	Lindy's	LK	Look magazine				
NANA	North American Newspaper Alliance	NB	Norman E. Brown	NEA	Newspaper Editors Association	NL	Navy Log	NYEP	New York Evening Post	NYS	New York Sun
OF	Oscar Fraley										
PD	Parke H. Davis	PB	Playboy								
Rivals	Rivals.com										
SH	Scripps-Howard	Scout	Scout.com	SN	Sporting News						
Time	Time Magazine										
UP	United Press	UPI	United Press International	USA	USA Today						
WCFF	Walter Camp Football Foundation	WD	Walter Dobbins								
Yahoo	Yahoo Sports										

== Arizona Wildcats Football First Team All-Americans ==
Year	Player name	Position	Selector(s)
1935	Ted Bland		
1937	Walt Nielsen	FB	
1938	Tom Greenfield	C/LB	
1941	Hank Stanton		
1971	Mark Arneson	LB	TSN
1975	Theo Bell	WR	NEA
1976	Mike Dawson	DE	
1982	Ricky Hunley	LB	AP, UPI, AFCA, NEA, WC, AFCA, FWAA
1983	Ricky Hunley	LB	
1985	Allen Durden		UPI, WC
1986	Joe Tofflemire	LB	Playboy, CFN
1987	Chuck Cecil	FS	UPI, WC, AFCA
1987	Joe Tofflemire	LB	
1988	Joe Tofflemire	LB	
1990	Darryll Lewis	CB	AP, UPI, WC, AFCA, FWAA, TSN, FN
1992	Josh Miller	P	FWAA, TSN
1992	Rob Waldrop	DT	AP, UPI, WC, FWAA, AFCA, SH, TSN, FN, NEA
1993	Sean Harris	LB	SH
1993	Rob Waldrop	DT	
1994	Steve McLaughlin	K	WC, FWAA, SH, SN
1994	Tony Bouie	S	WC, AFCA, SN
1994	Tedy Bruschi	LB	AP, WC, FWAA, AFCA, SH, UPI, TSN, SN
1995	Tedy Bruschi	LB	
1995	Chris McAlister	CB	AFCA, AP, FWAA, TSN, WC, FN
1999	Dennis Northcutt	WR	AP, AFCA, FWAA, CNNSI
2005	Danny Baugher†	P	PFW
2007	Antoine Cason	CB	AP, WC, SN, CNNSI, ESPN, CBS Sports, CFN, Rivals.com, Scout.com
2008	Rob Gronkowski	TE	AP
2012	Ka'Deem Carey†	RB	CBS Sports, AS, Scout.com, SN, WC, Lindy's, AP
2013	Ka'Deem Carey†	RB	
2014	Scooby Wright III‡	LB	AP, FWAA, AFCA, WC, SN, CNNSI, USA Today, ESPN, CBS Sports, CFN, Scout.com, and Yahoo! Sports
2024	Tetairoa McMillan†	WR	AFCA, AP, CBS, Athletic, PFF, USAT
