= 1993 All-Pacific-10 Conference football team =

The 1993 All-Pacific-10 Conference football team consists of American football players chosen by various organizations for All-Pac-12 Conference teams for the 1993 Pacific-10 Conference football season. The UCLA Bruins, Arizona Wildcats, and USC Trojans could all claim a conference championship, posting 6–2 conference records. UCLA wide receiver J. J. Stokes was voted Pac-10 Offensive Player of the Year. Arizona defensive tackle Rob Waldrop was voted Pac-10 Defensive Player of the Year.

== Offensive selections ==
=== Quarterbacks ===
- Rob Johnson, USC (Coaches-1)
- Steve Stenstrom, Stanford (Coaches-2)

=== Running backs ===
- Napoleon Kaufman, Washington (Coaches-1)
- Mario Bates, Arizona St. (Coaches-1)
- Deon Strother, USC (Coaches-2)
- J. J. Young, Oregon State (Coaches-2)

=== Wide receivers ===
- Johnnie Morton, USC (Coaches-1)
- J. J. Stokes, UCLA (Coaches-1)
- Justin Armour, Stanford (Coaches-2)
- Mike Caldwell, California (Coaches-2)

=== Tight ends ===
- Mark Bruener, Washington (Coaches-1)
- Brett Carolan, Washington State (Coaches-2)

=== Offensive line ===
- Todd Steussie, California (Coaches-1)
- Vaughn Parker, UCLA (Coaches-1)
- Tom Gallagher, Washington (Coaches-1)
- Eric Mahlum, California (Coaches-1)
- Craig Novitsky, UCLA (Coaches-1)
- Pete Pierson, Washington (Coaches-2)
- Warner Smith, Arizona (Coaches-2)
- Farrington Togiai, Arizona State (Coaches-2)
- Toby Mills, Arizona State (Coaches-2)
- Josh Dunning, Washington State (Coaches-2)

=== All purpose ===
- Chuck Levy, Arizona (Coaches-1)

== Defensive selections ==
=== Defensive line ===
- Tedy Bruschi, Arizona (Coaches-1)
- Rob Waldrop, Arizona (Coaches-1)
- Willie McGinest, USC (Coaches-1)
- DeWayne Patterson, Washington St. (Coaches-1)
- Shante Carver, Arizona State (Coaches-2)
- D'Marco Farr, Washington (Coaches-2)
- Romeo Bandison, Oregon (Coaches-2)
- Chad Eaton, Washington State (Coaches-2)

=== Linebackers ===
- Anthony McClanahan, Washington St. (Coaches-1)
- Jerrott Willard, California (Coaches-1)
- Sean Harris, Arizona (Coaches-1)
- Jamir Miller, UCLA (Coaches-1)
- Ernest Jones, Oregon (Coaches-2)
- Brant Boyer, Arizona (Coaches-2)
- Ron Childs, Washington State (Coaches-2)
- Jeremy Asher, Oregon (Coaches-2)

=== Defensive backs ===
- Tony Bouie, Arizona (Coaches-1)
- Marvin Goodwin, UCLA (Coaches-1)
- Eric Zomalt, California (Coaches-1)
- Craig Newsome, Arizona St. (Coaches-1)
- Vaughn Bryant, Stanford (Coaches-2)
- Brandon Sanders, Arizona (Coaches-2)
- Chad Cota, Oregon (Coaches-2)
- Torey Hunter Washington State (Coaches-2)

== Special teams ==
=== Placekickers ===
- Bjorn Merten, UCLA (Coaches-1)
- Tommy Thompson, Oregon (Coaches-2)

=== Punters ===
- Darren Schager, UCLA (Coaches-1)
- Tim Kollas, Oregon State (Coaches-2)

=== Return specialists ===
- Deron Pointer, Washington St. (Coaches-1)
- Matt Clizbe, California (Coaches-2)

== Key ==
Coaches = selected by the conference coaches

== See also ==
- 1993 College Football All-America Team
