= Nike Global Challenge =

- Founded: 2007
- Folded: 2015; 10 years ago
- Country: United States
- Number of teams: 8
- Most championships: USA West; USA Midwest (2 titles each)

The Nike Global Challenge was an annual men's prep basketball tournament held in the Portland metropolitan area during the summer. Sponsored by Nike, Inc., games were usually played at Liberty High School in Hillsboro, Oregon. The tournament started in 2007 and has featured high school players such as John Wall, DeMarcus Cousins, Avery Bradley, Austin Rivers, and Anthony Davis. High school-aged players from around the world play on all-star teams for each of the countries represented. The United States makes up three of the eight teams in the sixteen game tournament.

== History ==
The event was established in 2007 with the first set of games held at the Chiles Center at the University of Portland in Oregon. The next year the tournament was moved to Liberty High School in Hillsboro, Oregon, where it remained through 2011. In 2012, the tournament was played in Washington, DC.

== See also ==
- Nike Hoop Summit
