= Shante Carver =

American gridiron football player (born 1971)

No. 96, 78, 92
- Position: Defensive end

Personal information
- Born: February 12, 1971 (age 55); Stockton, California, U.S.
- Listed height: 6 ft 5 in (1.96 m)
- Listed weight: 253 lb (115 kg)

Career information
- High school: Lincoln (Stockton)
- College: Arizona State
- NFL draft: 1994: 1st round, 23rd overall pick

Career history
- Dallas Cowboys (1994–1997); B.C. Lions (2000)*; Memphis Maniax (2001); Dallas Desperados (2002–2004)
- * Offseason or practice squad member only

Awards and highlights
- Super Bowl champion (XXX); All-XFL (2001); AFL All-Rookie Team (2002); First-team All-American (1993); Third-team All-American (1992); First-team All-Pac-10 (1992); Second-team All-Pac-10 (1993)

Career NFL statistics
- Tackles: 75
- Sacks: 11.5
- Fumble recoveries: 1
- Stats at Pro Football Reference

Career AFL statistics
- Tackles: 27
- Sacks: 4.5
- Passes defended: 8
- Stats at ArenaFan.com

Shante Carver (born February 12, 1971) is an American former professional football player who was a defensive end for the Dallas Cowboys of the National Football League (NFL). He played college football for the Arizona State Sun Devils. He also played professionally for the Memphis Maniax and Dallas Desperados.

== Early life ==
Carver attended Lincoln High School, where he played football (defensive end / tight end) and basketball (center), receiving All-state honors as a senior in both sports.

As a senior, he tallied 33 tackles, 5 sacks and 20 receptions for 452 yards. In basketball, he posted 21 and 24 rebounds in consecutive games. The Stockton Record named him its Male Athlete of the year and he also received the California Grid-Hoops player of the year award.

== College career ==
Carver accepted a football scholarship from Arizona State University. As a redshirt freshman, he was named a starter at defensive end and became one of the best pass rushers in the nation. He registered 48 tackles (11 for loss), 10 sacks (school record for freshman), 14 quarterback pressures and 4 passes defensed.

As a sophomore, he was dismissed from the school, for academic reasons, and he lost his mother to a terrible car crash as well as his grandmother (natural causes) all in a couple of months. Carver overcame all the setbacks and personal loss and was later admitted back into Arizona State University as a student athlete. He collected 39 tackles (16 for loss), 11 sacks, 20 quarterback pressures and 6 passes defensed.

As a junior, he tallied 59 tackles (13 for loss), 10 sacks, 27 quarterback pressures, 2 passes defensed, 2 forced fumbles and one fumble recovery.

Carver had a dominant senior season in which the defensive unit was nicknamed "Shante's Inferno". He led the team in tackles (79), tackles for loss (17), sacks (10.0) and quarterback pressures (25). He also had 4 passes defensed and 3 fumble recoveries.

He was a four-year starter, that recorded double-figure sacks in each of his collegiate seasons, had 20-or-more quarterback pressures and was named the team defensive MVP, in all but his freshman year. He was a two-time All-American and All-Pac-10 and a finalist for the Outland Trophy. His athletic ability also allowed him to walk-on to the basketball team during the 1992–93 season, playing in 9 contests, while averaging 0.4 points and 0.8 rebounds per game.

Carver finished his college career with 225 tackles, 41 sacks (school record), 86 quarterback pressures (school record), 57 tackles for loss, 16 passes defensed, 2 forced fumbles, 4 fumble recoveries and 5 blocked kicks. Most of his school records were broken by Terrell Suggs in 2002.

In 2012, he was inducted into the Arizona State University Sports Hall of Fame.

== Professional career ==
Pre-draft measurables
Height	Weight	Arm length	Hand span	40-yard dash	10-yard split	20-yard split	20-yard shuttle	Vertical jump
6 ft 4 7/8 in (1.95 m)	239 lb (108 kg)	35 1/2 in (0.90 m)	9 1/8 in (0.23 m)	5.05 s	1.80 s	2.89 s	4.59 s	30.0 in (0.76 m)
All values from NFL Combine

=== Dallas Cowboys ===
Looking for a successor to replace Charles Haley and Tony Tolbert in the 1994 NFL draft, the Dallas Cowboys tried to trade up to acquire Willie McGinest. After being unable to make the transaction, they traded their first (#28-William Floyd) and second-round (#62-Tyronne Drakeford) selections to the San Francisco 49ers, in exchange for a first (#23) and a seventh round (#217-Rob Holmberg) draft choice, in order to move up and take Carver in the first round.

As a rookie, he played in 10 games because of injuries, finishing with 5 tackles (one for loss). He also made news after suffering an automobile accident, abandoning his truck and reporting it as stolen.

In 1995, he did not have a good regular season, making 21 tackles (one for loss), 2.5 sacks, 3 quarterback pressures and one pass defensed. While Haley was injured, he started the season finale and 2 playoff games. He also contributed as a backup in Super Bowl XXX, with a then career-high 5 tackles.

In 1996, the Cowboys drafted Kavika Pittman to have a replacement ready in case his lack of production continued. Carver was suspended six games for repeated violations of the league's anti-drug policy. He started the final 7 games of the regular season and both playoff contests in place of an injured Haley, while registering 33 tackles (one for loss), 3 sacks, 8 quarterback pressures, one pass defensed and one forced fumble.

In 1997, he finished with 47 tackles (ninth on the team) 6 sacks (led the team), 9 quarterback pressures (second on the team), 3 tackles for loss and 3 passes defensed. The Cowboys did not re-sign him at the end of the season, finishing his career with 26 starts in four seasons, 11.5 sacks and 2 forced fumbles.

=== B.C. Lions ===
On May 26, 2000, he signed with the B.C. Lions of the Canadian Football League. He was released on June 29.

=== Memphis Maniax ===
In 2001, he was selected by the Memphis Maniax in the 23rd round (179th overall) of the XFL Draft, for the league's lone season. After recording 32 tackles 4 sacks and 1 interception, he was recognized as one of the best defensive players and was named to the All-XFL team. He also is remembered for delivering a particularly spectacular sack on Orlando Rage quarterback Jeff Brohm.

=== Dallas Desperados ===
On November 26, 2001, Carver signed with the Dallas Desperados who were owned by Jerry Jones (who also owned the Dallas Cowboys), after the XFL folded. He earned AFL All-Rookie honors after registering 16 tackles, 2.5 sacks and 2 interceptions. He played for the team three years, retiring at the end of the 2004 season.

== Personal life ==
Carver was a football assistant coach at Scottsdale Community College from 2005 to 2007. In 2009, he was named he head coach for the semi pro football team Westside Monsoon in the Arizona Football League. In 2011, he coached the defensive line at Moon Valley High School.
