= 1993 Oregon Ducks football team =

American college football season

1993 Oregon Ducks football
- Conference: Pacific-10 Conference
- Record: 5–6 (2–6 Pac-10)
- Head coach: Rich Brooks (17th season)
- Offensive coordinator: Mike Bellotti (5th season)
- Offensive scheme: Pro-style
- Defensive coordinator: Nick Aliotti (1st season)
- Base defense: 4–3
- Captains: Ernest Jones; Willy Tate
- Home stadium: Autzen Stadium

1993 Pacific-10 Conference football standings
| | Conf. | | | | | Overall |
| Team | W | | L | | T | W | | L | | T |
|---|---|---|---|---|---|---|---|---|---|---|
| No. 10 Arizona + | 6 | – | 2 | – | 0 | 10 | – | 2 | – | 0 |
| No. 18 UCLA + | 6 | – | 2 | – | 0 | 8 | – | 4 | – | 0 |
| USC + | 6 | – | 2 | – | 0 | 8 | – | 5 | – | 0 |
| Washington | 5 | – | 3 | – | 0 | 7 | – | 4 | – | 0 |
| No. 25 California | 4 | – | 4 | – | 0 | 9 | – | 4 | – | 0 |
| Arizona State | 4 | – | 4 | – | 0 | 6 | – | 5 | – | 0 |
| Washington State | 3 | – | 5 | – | 0 | 5 | – | 6 | – | 0 |
| Oregon | 2 | – | 6 | – | 0 | 5 | – | 6 | – | 0 |
| Oregon State | 2 | – | 6 | – | 0 | 4 | – | 7 | – | 0 |
| Stanford | 2 | – | 6 | – | 0 | 4 | – | 7 | – | 0 |
+ – Conference co-champions; Rankings from AP Poll

The 1993 Oregon Ducks football team represented the University of Oregon during the 1993 NCAA Division I-A football season. They were led by head coach Rich Brooks, who was in his 17th season as head coach of the Ducks. They played their home games at Autzen Stadium in Eugene, Oregon and participated as members of the Pacific-10 Conference.

== Schedule ==
| Date | Time | Opponent | Site | TV | Result | Attendance | Source |
|---|---|---|---|---|---|---|---|
| September 4 | 11:00 am | at Colorado State* | Hughes Stadium; Fort Collins, CO | | W 23–9 | 21,721 | |
| September 11 | 1:00 pm | No. 21 (I-AA) Montana* | Autzen Stadium; Eugene, OR | | W 35–30 | 33,183 | |
| September 25 | 11:00 am | at Illinois* | Memorial Stadium; Champaign, IL | | W 13–7 | 45,574 | |
| October 2 | 12:30 pm | at No. 17 California | California Memorial Stadium; Berkeley, CA | | L 41–42 | 34,000 | |
| October 9 | 3:30 pm | USC | Autzen Stadium; Eugene, OR (rivalry) | Prime | L 13–24 | 40,935 | |
| October 16 | 7:00 pm | at Arizona State | Sun Devil Stadium; Tempe, AZ | | W 45–36 | 32,625 | |
| October 23 | 12:30 pm | at No. 22 Washington | Husky Stadium; Seattle, WA (rivalry) | | L 6–21 | 72,534 | |
| October 30 | 1:00 pm | Washington State | Autzen Stadium; Eugene, OR | | W 46–23 | 35,846 | |
| November 6 | 6:30 pm | at No. 14 Arizona | Arizona Stadium; Tucson, AZ | OSN | L 10–31 | 57,309 | |
| November 13 | 1:00 pm | Stanford | Autzen Stadium; Eugene, OR (rivalry) | | L 34–38 | 31,214 | |
| November 20 | 3:30 pm | Oregon State | Autzen Stadium; Eugene, OR (Civil War) | Prime | L 12–15 | 42,267 | |
*Non-conference game; Rankings from AP Poll released prior to the game; All times are in Pacific time

== Games summaries ==
=== Oregon State ===
Oregon State Beavers (3–7) at Oregon Ducks

| Quarter | 1 | 2 | 3 | 4 | Total |
|---|---|---|---|---|---|
| Oregon St | 7 | 0 | 0 | 8 | 15 |
| Oregon | 3 | 0 | 9 | 0 | 12 |

at Autzen Stadium, Eugene, Oregon

- Date: November 20, 1993
- Eugene Register-Guard, 21 Nov 1993.

Game information

First quarter

- OSU – Herschel Currie 45-yard interception return (Brooke Knight kick), 13:35. Oregon St 7–0.
- ORE – Tommy Thompson 37-yard field goal, 5:45. Oregon St 7–3. Drive: 11 plays, 65 yards.

Third quarter

- ORE – Tommy Thompson 27-yard field goal, 10:47. Oregon St 7–6. Drive: 7 plays, 44 yards.
- ORE – Dwayne Jones 1-yard run (pass failed), 3:18. Oregon 12–7. Drive: 9 plays, 74 yards.

Fourth quarter

- OSU – J.J. Young 2-yard run (run good), 3:50. Oregon St 15–12. Drive: 6 plays, 24 yards.

Top passers

- OSU – Rahim Muhammad – 1/3, 16 yards
- ORE – Danny O'Neil – 15/34, 187 yards, INT

Top rushers

- OSU – Rahim Muhammad – 25 rushes, 85 yards
- ORE – Sean Burwell – 3 rushes, 15 yards

Top receivers

- OSU – Chris Cross – 1 reception, 16 yards
- ORE – Derrick Deadwiler – 6 receptions, 92 yarfds

== Roster ==
1993 Oregon Ducks football team roster
Players
Coaches
Offense

| Pos. | # | Name | Class |
|---|---|---|---|
| RB | | Sean Burwell |
| WR | | Derrick Deadwiler |
| QB | 16 | Danny O'Neil | Jr |

Defense

| Pos. | # | Name | Class |
|---|---|---|---|
| DB | 7 | Chad Cota | Jr |

Special teams

| Pos. | # | Name | Class |
|---|---|---|---|
| K | | Tommy Thompson | Sr |

Head coach

- Rich Brooks

Coordinators/assistant coaches

Legend

- (C) Team captain
- (S) Suspended
- (I) Ineligible
- Injured
- Redshirt
