= 1992 All-Pacific-10 Conference football team =

The 1992 All-Pacific-10 Conference football team consists of American football players chosen by various organizations for All-Pacific-10 Conference teams for the 1992 college football season.

== Offensive selections ==
=== Quarterbacks ===
- Drew Bledsoe, Washington St. (Coaches-1)
- Mark Brunell, Washington (Coaches-2)

=== Running backs ===
- Napoleon Kaufman, Washington (Coaches-1)
- Glyn Milburn, Stanford (Coaches-1)
- Shaumbe Wright-Fair, Washington St. (Coaches-2)
- Russell White, California (Coaches-2)

=== Wide receivers ===
- Sean Dawkins, California (Coaches-1)
- Curtis Conway, USC (Coaches-1)
- Eric Guliford, Arizona St. (Coaches-2)
- Johnnie Morton, USC (Coaches-2)

=== Tight ends ===
- Clarence Williams, Washington St. (Coaches-1)
- Bob Brasher, Arizona St. (Coaches-2)

=== Tackles ===
- Tony Boselli, USC (Coaches-1)
- Lincoln Kennedy, Washington (Coaches-1)
- Todd Steussie, California (Coaches-1)
- Bob Garman, Washington St. (Coaches-2)
- Mike Heemsbergen, Arizona (Coaches-2)

=== Guards/Centers ===
- Vaughn Parker, UCLA (Coaches-1)
- Fletcher Keister, Oregon St. (Coaches-1)
- Chris Dalman, Stanford (Coaches-2)
- Toby Mills, Arizona St. (Coaches-2)
- Robbie Tobeck, Washington St. (Coaches-2)

== Defensive selections ==
=== Ends ===
- Chidi Ahanotu, California (Coaches-1)
- Shante Carver, Arizona St. (Coaches-1)
- Jeff Cummins, Oregon (Coaches-2)

=== Tackles ===
- Rob Waldrop, Arizona (Coaches-1)
- Romeo Bandison, Oregon (Coaches-2)
- David Webb, USC (Coaches-2)

=== Linebackers ===
- Ron George, Stanford (Coaches-1)
- Dave Hoffmann, Washington (Coaches-1)
- Brett Wallerstedt, Arizona St. (Coaches-1)
- Willie McGinest, USC (Coaches-1)
- Anthony McClanahan, Washington St. (Coaches-2)
- Jerrott Willard, California (Coaches-2)
- Sean Harris, Arizona (Coaches-2)
- Jaime Fields, Washington (Coaches-2)

=== Cornerbacks ===
- Carlton Gray, UCLA (Coaches-1)
- Kevin Miniefield, Arizona St. (Coaches-1)
- Keshon Johnson, Arizona (Coaches-1)
- Darrien Gordon, Stanford (Coaches-2)
- Othello Henderson, UCLA (Coaches-2)

=== Safeties ===
- John Lynch, Stanford (Coaches-1)
- Eric Castle, Oregon (Coaches-1)
- Stephon Pace, USC (Coaches-2)
- Shane Pahukoa, Washington (Coaches-2)

== Special teams ==
=== Placekickers ===
- Tommy Thompson, Oregon (Coaches-1)
- Doug Brien, California (Coaches-2)

=== Punters ===
- Josh Miller, Arizona (Coaches-1)
- Tommy Thompson, Oregon (Coaches-2)

=== Return specialists ===
- Curtis Conway, USC (Coaches-1)
- Glyn Milburn, Stanford (Coaches-2)

== Key ==
Coaches = Pacific-10 head football coaches

== See also ==
- 1992 College Football All-America Team
