= Romeo Bandison =

Dutch gridiron football player (born 1971)

No. 72, 97, 99
- Position: Defensive tackle

Personal information
- Born: 12 February 1971 (age 55); The Hague, Netherlands
- Listed height: 6 ft 5 in (1.96 m)
- Listed weight: 290 lb (132 kg)

Career information
- High school: Tamalpais (Mill Valley, California)
- College: Oregon
- NFL draft: 1994: 3rd round, 75th overall pick

Career history
- Cleveland Browns (1994–1995); Washington Redskins (1995–1996); Amsterdam Admirals (1998)

Awards and highlights
- 2× Second-team All-Pac-10 (1992, 1993)

Career NFL statistics
- Tackles: 8
- Stats at Pro Football Reference

Romeo Bandison (born 12 February 1971) is a Dutch former professional player of American football who was a defensive tackle in the National Football League (NFL) for the Washington Redskins, who drafted him in the third round of the 1994 NFL draft. He played his senior year of high school football at Tamalpais (Mill Valley, CA), college football at the University of Oregon and also played a season in his homeland for the Amsterdam Admirals of the (then) WLAF.
