= Demetrius Williams =

American football player (born 1983)

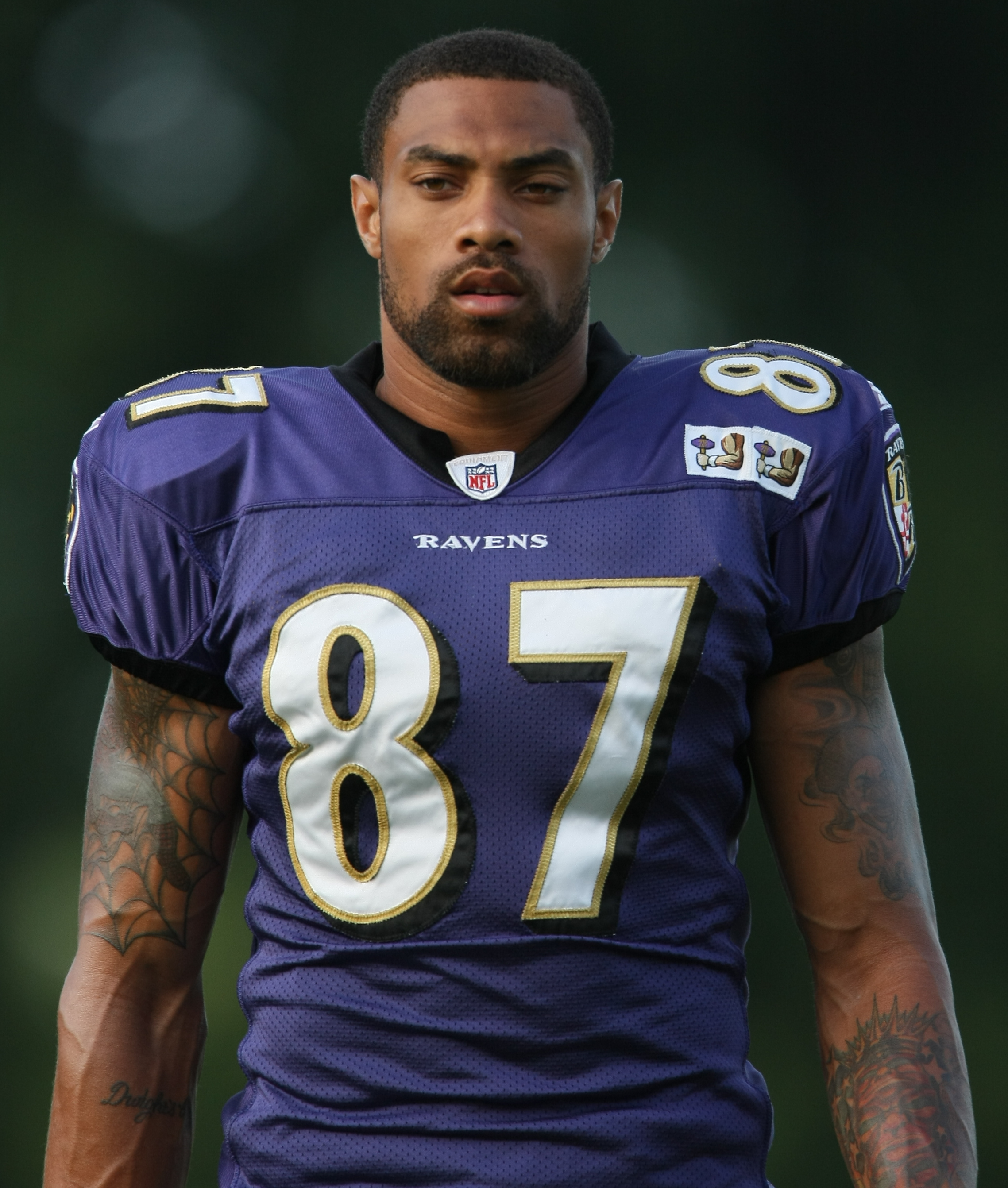
- Williams with the Baltimore Ravens in 2009

No. 87, 88, 17
- Position: Wide receiver

Personal information
- Born: March 28, 1983 (age 43); Concord, California, U.S.
- Listed height: 6 ft 2 in (1.88 m)
- Listed weight: 202 lb (92 kg)

Career information
- High school: De La Salle (Concord)
- College: Oregon
- NFL draft: 2006: 4th round, 111th overall pick

Career history
- Baltimore Ravens (2006–2009); Cleveland Browns (2010); Jacksonville Jaguars (2012)*; Sacramento Mountain Lions (2012)
- * Offseason or practice squad member only

Awards and highlights
- Second-team All-Pac-10 (2005)

Career NFL statistics
- Receptions: 63
- Receiving yards: 1,008
- Receiving touchdowns: 4
- Stats at Pro Football Reference

Demetrius Terrell Williams (born March 28, 1983) is an American former professional football player who was a wide receiver in the National Football League (NFL). He was selected by the Baltimore Ravens in the fourth round of the 2006 NFL draft. He played college football for the Oregon Ducks.

== Early life ==
Williams was a SuperPrep All-American and was also a unanimous Long Beach Press-Telegram Best in the West selection. He accumulated 34 catches for 829 yards and 15 touchdowns in his senior year, in addition to returning one punt into the end zone. He played his high school football at perennial national powerhouse, De La Salle.

== College career ==
Williams attended the University of Oregon and became one of the best receivers in Oregon history. His 162 career receptions tied him for 3rd all time, and his 2,660 yards are 4th all time. Williams' 11 games with 100 or more yards receiving is an Oregon record and his 20 career TD catches are good for 4th all time. He majored in sociology.

== Professional career ==
Pre-draft measurables
Height	Weight	Arm length	Hand span	20-yard shuttle	Three-cone drill	Vertical jump	Broad jump
6 ft 1 3/4 in (1.87 m)	197 lb (89 kg)	33 1/4 in (0.84 m)	8 3/4 in (0.22 m)	4.08 s	6.84 s	38.0 in (0.97 m)	10 ft 7 in (3.23 m)
All values from NFL Combine/Pro Day

=== Baltimore Ravens ===
After initially being projected as a second round pick, Williams slipped to the fourth round and was the 111th selection in the draft, where he was picked by the Baltimore Ravens. After a strong training camp and an impressive pre-season, Williams became the slot receiver for the Ravens.

During the 2006 season, Williams caught 22 balls for 396 yards (18.0 avg) and 2 touchdowns. His highlight came in Week 15 against the Cleveland Browns where he caught a 77-yard pass for a touchdown from Kyle Boller that sealed the game and the win for the Ravens. He also was a huge part of the (at the time) franchise record comeback win over the Tennessee Titans, where he caught 4 passes for 75 yards to help the Ravens overcome a 26–17 deficit and win the game 27–26. He finished the season with the (at that time) franchise best 18 yards per catch average for a Ravens rookie.

Coming into the 2007 season, he was expected to take a huge leap forward as the Ravens "deep threat" receiver, and looked to fulfill that promise with 18 receptions for 267 yards, before being eventually derailed by injury and put on IR after Week 9. He attempted to make a comeback in the 2008 season, once again looking to become the Ravens' big play-maker and stretch the field. After shaking off a little rust, he began to heat up near mid-season with a few big catches, including a 70 touchdown reception against the Oakland Raiders in Week 7. However, he was also unable to continue after that play, with pain from bone spurs in his leg that eventually put him on IR for the season, once again, after surgery.

The Ravens didn't draft any big receivers in the 2009 off-season, with general manager Ozzie Newsome stating that they had faith in the receivers they had, and that they were sticking with Williams as their field stretching player. Unfortunately, the injury bug would pop up yet again, this time with only a minor injury during the pre-season, but it was enough to keep him out a game, and give other players time to shine. Though he returned would return, and in the final game of the pre-season posted 4 catches for 77 yards, once again showing his downfield ability, the Ravens ultimately chose to go with Kelley Washington #3 receiver. Due to offensive coordinator Cam Cameron typically only using three receiver sets, this meant that Demetrius saw little to no playing time for over half the 2009 season. Washington went down with injury in a Week 13 matchup with the Detroit Lions, and Williams stepped in and made 2 catches for 45 yds. in a 48–3 rout. The following week, he again showed his promise as a playmaker, with 4 catches for 71 yards and a touchdown against the Chicago Bears. He remained active for the rest of the season, but Washington returned in the following weeks, retaking his #3 spot. Many fans openly wondered at the logic of not playing a speedy receiver like Williams, when the 2009 Ravens ranked near the bottom of the league in yards per catch, and yards after catch.

Though he remained with the team and worked hard in the 2010 Ravens off-season programs, he was ultimately cut in August 2010 after the Ravens had signed Donté Stallworth. Ironically, the Ravens had signed Stallworth to take Williams' former role as deep threat receiver, yet he himself would be inactive for much of the season with an injury. Williams finished his Ravens career with a total of 63 receptions, 1,008 yards, and four touchdowns on a 16.0 yard receiving average.

=== Cleveland Browns ===
Demetrius Williams signed with the Cleveland Browns on October 26, 2010. He was targeted twice in a loss to his old team (the Ravens) but saw little playing time overall, and ended the season without a reception. He did, however, see playing time on Cleveland's special teams unit. His contract was terminated on September 3, 2011.

=== Jacksonville Jaguars ===
Williams was signed by the Jacksonville Jaguars on August 12, 2012, and later released on August 31.

=== Sacramento Mountain Lions ===
He played for the Sacramento Mountain Lions of the United Football League for the 2012 season.
