= Mike Caldwell (wide receiver) =

American football player (born 1971)

No. 81, 17
- Position: Wide receiver

Personal information
- Born: March 28, 1971 (age 55); Cleveland, Ohio, U.S.
- Listed height: 6 ft 2 in (1.88 m)
- Listed weight: 200 lb (91 kg)

Career information
- College: California
- NFL draft: 1994: undrafted

Career history
- New Orleans Saints (1994)*; San Francisco 49ers (1994–1996); Philadelphia Eagles (1997)*
- * Offseason or practice squad member only

Awards and highlights
- Super Bowl champion (XXIX); Second-team All-Pac-10 (1993)
- Stats at Pro Football Reference

Michael Todd Caldwell (born March 28, 1971) is an American former professional football player who was a wide receiver for the San Francisco 49ers of the National Football League (NFL). He played college football for the California Golden Bears.
