= Vaughn Parker =

American football player (born 1971)

No. 70, 78
- Position: Offensive tackle

Personal information
- Born: June 5, 1971 (age 55); Buffalo, New York, U.S.
- Listed height: 6 ft 3 in (1.91 m)
- Listed weight: 300 lb (136 kg)

Career information
- High school: St. Joseph's Collegiate Institute (Tonawanda, New York)
- College: UCLA
- NFL draft: 1994: 2nd round, 63rd overall pick

Career history
- San Diego Chargers (1994–2003); Washington Redskins (2004)

Awards and highlights
- Third-team All-American (1993); 3× First-team All-Pac-10 (1991, 1992, 1993)

Career NFL statistics
- Games played: 122
- Games started: 107
- Fumble recoveries: 4
- Stats at Pro Football Reference

Vaughn Antoine Parker (born June 5, 1971) is an American former professional football player who was an offensive tackle in the National Football League (NFL) for the San Diego Chargers and Washington Redskins. He played college football for the UCLA Bruins, earning third-team All-American honors in 1993.

Parker played high school football at St. Joseph's Collegiate Institute in Buffalo, New York, where he was named to the All-Western New York and All-Northeast teams. At the University of California, Los Angeles, he became only the second offensive player in school history to be named to the all-conference team three times. Parker was selected in the second round (63rd overall) of the 1994 NFL draft by the Chargers. His rookie year, the Chargers won the AFC Championship and faced San Francisco in Super Bowl XXIX. Parker spent ten seasons playing for the Chargers, with his final season (2003) there cut short by a season-ending knee injury. He signed with the Redskins for the 2004 season and appeared in one game before being waived at the conclusion of the season.

Vaughn successfully earned an Executive MBA through the University of Southern California in May 2017. In November 2017, Parker was officially recognized by his hometown for his sports achievements when he was inducted into the Greater Buffalo Sports Hall of Fame. He currently lives in San Diego, California.
