= Chuck Levy =

American gridiron football player (born 1972)

No. 4, 32, 23, 20
- Position: Running back

Personal information
- Born: January 7, 1972 (age 54); Torrance, California, U.S.
- Listed height: 6 ft 0 in (1.83 m)
- Listed weight: 206 lb (93 kg)

Career information
- High school: Lynwood (Lynwood, California)
- College: Arizona
- NFL draft: 1994: 2nd round, 38th overall pick

Career history
- Arizona Cardinals (1994–1995); San Francisco 49ers (1996–1998); British Columbia Lions (2000); Detroit Fury (2001); Toronto Argonauts (2003); Detroit Fury (2002)

Awards and highlights
- Grey Cup champion (2000); 2× First-team All-Pac-10 (1991, 1993)

Career NFL statistics
- Rushing yards: 217
- Rushing average: 4.9
- Receptions: 24
- Receiving yards: 167
- Touchdowns: 2
- Stats at Pro Football Reference

Charles Levy (born January 7, 1972) is an American former professional football player who was a running back for five seasons with the Arizona Cardinals and the San Francisco 49ers of the National Football League (NFL). He played college football for the Arizona Wildcats and was selected by the Cardinals in the second round of the 1994 NFL draft with the 38th overall pick.
