= Liberty High School (Oregon) =

Public school in Oregon, United States

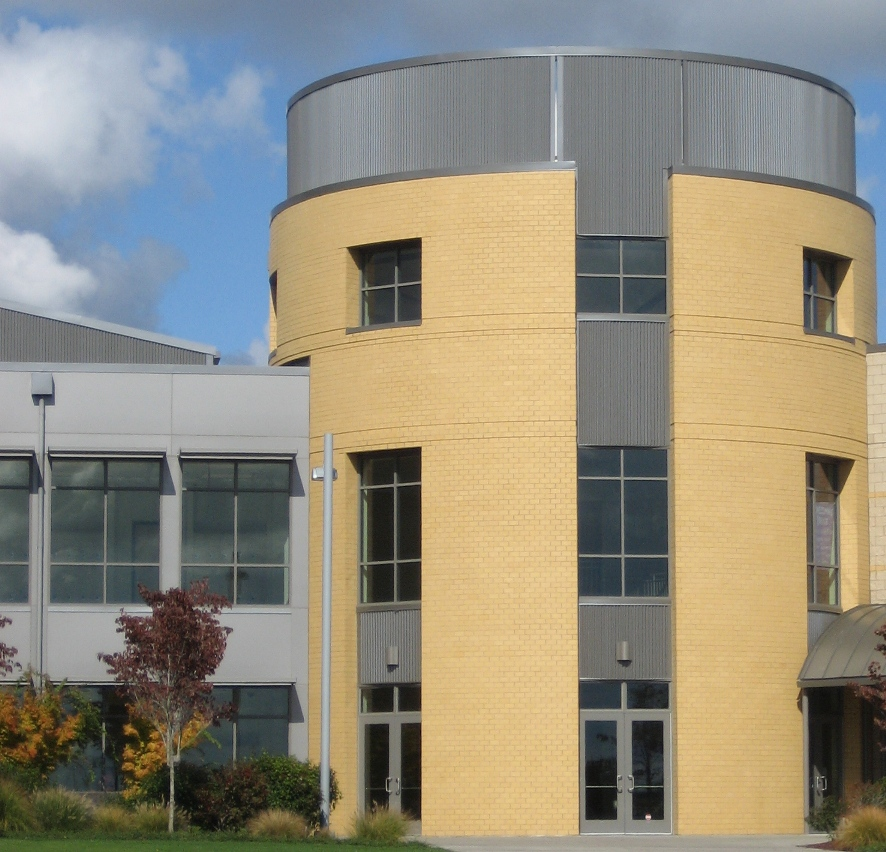

Location
- 7445 NE Wagon Drive; Hillsboro, Oregon 97124; United States
- 45°33′45″N 122°54′09″W

Information
- School type: Public, high school
- Founded: 2003
- School district: Hillsboro School District 1J
- Principal: Roger Will
- Staff: 68.41 (FTE)
- Grades: 9–12
- Enrollment: 1,435 (2023-2024)
- Student to teacher ratio: 20.98
- Language: English
- Campus: Suburban, closed-campus
- Colors: Navy blue, Columbia blue, and Vegas Gold
- Mascot: Talon, a falcon
- Team name: Falcons
- Rival: Westview High School (Portland, Oregon)
- Feeder schools: Poynter Middle School
- Website: www.hsd.k12.or.us/liberty

Liberty High School (LHS) is located in Hillsboro, Oregon, United States, just west of Portland. It opened in 2003, with only freshmen, sophomores and juniors. The school has 1,534 students (2017–2018) and 140 faculty members. As of 2016, the graduation rate was 85%. It is the newest high school in the Hillsboro School District.

== Construction ==
The school was designed by Mahlum Architects and features a rotunda two and a half stories tall at the main entrance. Robinson Construction served as general contractor on the $49.3 million campus. Amenities at the 292,000-square-foot (27,100 m^{2}) school include a 536-seat theater and a 3,500-seat gym.

== History ==
The school was previously organized by a "Small Schools Initiative" that divided the student body into four different "sub"-schools (academies). These are the Academy of Arts and Design, the Health and Human Services Academy, the Media, Culinary and Marketing Academy, and the Science, Engineering and Technology Academy. As of 2007, the student body was reorganized into three academies: the Freshman Academy, the Arts, Communication and Technology Academy, and the Health and Human Services Academy. The newly proposed Freshman Academy was introduced to compensate for the high amount of failing grades that previous freshmen were receiving. Once the freshmen have moved on to their sophomore year, they must then decide which of the other two academies they will join. In these academies the students work in various Focus Programs of study similar to college majors. The focus programs include Instrumental Music, Vocal Music, Visual Arts, Theatre Performance, Theatre Production, Child Services, Health Services, Public Services, Culinary Arts, Marketing/Management, Media Communications, Engineering, Science, and Technology.

Liberty has a student-run television studio referred to as "LTV." The students put on a broadcast every week, which informs viewers of activities, awards, and announcements, and includes video clips of sporting events. The Patrick Henry was the school's newspaper.

In 2006 and 2007, the Liberty Culinary team won silver medals at the National Culinary Arts Event. They competed there after winning gold medals at state in the spring. In both 2008 and 2009 they won the bronze medal at the national event.

In May 2018 a student of the school filed a suit against Liberty, alleging it violated his First Amendment rights of freedom of speech when it suspended him for wearing a T-shirt supportive of the Mexico–United States border wall. Hillsboro School District settled with the student two months later for $25,000.

=== Address ===
The school's address was originally 21945 NW Wagon Way, but in 2017 was changed to 7445 NE Wagon Drive (for the same location) as part of the City of Hillsboro's implementation of a major street-renaming plan in the eastern part of Hillsboro. The plan was focused on modifying the compass indications, and in some cases the names, of streets whose designations had been based on the Portland grid (e.g. NW, being west of Portland), as they were located in unincorporated areas, but which had subsequently been annexed by Hillsboro, making "NE" a more logical indication than "NW".

== Academics ==
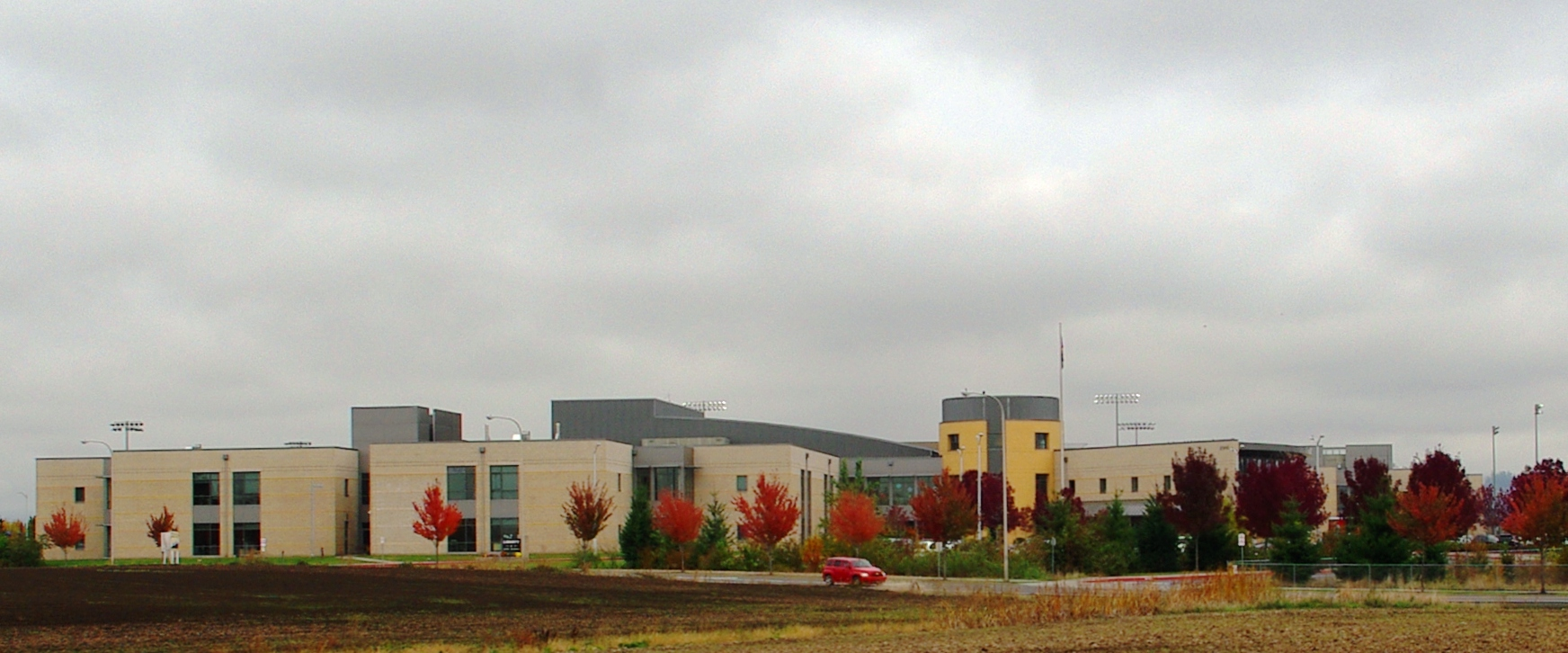
Front of the school

In 2015, 82% of the school's seniors received a high school diploma. Of 389 students, 43 dropped out. The percentage of students who meet or exceed statewide standards for English is 58% (state average is 69%); for 32% for math (state average is 33%); and 69% for science (state average is 59%). 19% of the school are English Language Learners.

== Athletics ==
Liberty is a member of the Pacific Conference, a 6A division of the Oregon School Activities Association. Home football games are played at Falcon Stadium. Liberty's nickname is the Falcons, with navy blue, Columbia blue, and Vegas Gold as the school colors. Liberty's Football team was coached by ex NFL Player Eric Mahlum from 2008 to 2023. Since 2004, the Les Schwab Invitational high school basketball tournament has been played there. Liberty also hosted the Reser’s Tournament of Champions for 22 years until 2023 when they changed venues to Sherwood HS.
