= Chidi Ahanotu =

American football player (born 1970)

No. 90, 72, 75, 95
- Positions: Defensive end, defensive tackle

Personal information
- Born: October 11, 1970 (age 56); Modesto, California, U.S.
- Listed height: 6 ft 2 in (1.88 m)
- Listed weight: 285 lb (129 kg)

Career information
- High school: Berkeley (Berkeley, California)
- College: California
- NFL draft: 1993: 6th round, 145th overall pick

Career history
- Tampa Bay Buccaneers (1993–2000); St. Louis Rams (2001); Buffalo Bills (2002); San Francisco 49ers (2003); Miami Dolphins (2004); Tampa Bay Buccaneers (2004)

Awards and highlights
- First-team All-Pac-10 (1992)

Career NFL statistics
- Tackles: 437
- Sacks: 46.5
- Forced fumbles: 4
- Fumble recoveries: 7
- Passes defended: 8
- Stats at Pro Football Reference

Chidi Obioma Ahanotu (born October 11, 1970) is an American former professional football player who was a defensive end in the National Football League (NFL). He played college football for the California Golden Bears and was selected in the 1993 NFL draft by the Tampa Bay Buccaneers, for whom he would play in nine of his twelve professional seasons.

== Early life ==
Ahanotu was born in Modesto, California, to Nigerian father and a mother from Tuskegee Alabama, and was the middle son of three boys. His father was on the Nigeria national soccer team and taught him and his 2 brothers how to play the sport when they were 5 years old. He also loved to cook.

Ahanotu grew up in Berkeley, California, and attended Berkeley High School, where he lettered in football and rugby. He was accepted into Columbia University; Hampton University; University of California, Los Angeles; and University of California, Berkeley.

== College career ==
Ahanotu attended UC Berkeley and walked onto the Golden Bears football team. After his redshirt freshman year, Ahanotu began to play during his second season, following which he earned a full athletic scholarship and became the Golden Bears' starting left defensive end. He went on to be the starter for 3 more football seasons and earned 1st team All-Pac-10 honors as the best at his position in 1992. Ahanotu majored in Integrative Biology and originally intended to go to medical school to become a doctor before joining the NFL.

== Professional career ==
The Tampa Bay Buccaneers selected Ahanotu in the sixth round with the 145th pick of the 1993 NFL draft. Ahanotu spent the first eight years of his career with the Buccaneers. He later played for the St. Louis Rams, Buffalo Bills, San Francisco 49ers, and Miami Dolphins for one season each before returning to the Buccaneers during the 2004 season. He recorded 46.5 total sacks in his 12-year NFL career, and his 34.5 sacks as a Buccaneer rank fifth in franchise history.

Ahanotu is regarded quite highly in the history of Buccaneer defenders. He was named the team's "Franchise Player" in 1999, and in 2019, he was ranked 18th on a USA Today-published list of the 100 best Buccaneers players.

While playing for the Bills in 2002, Ahanotu made the unusual decision to live in Toronto and commute two hours to Buffalo. He paid a driver $5,000 a month while fulfilling his desire to live outside the United States.

== Post-playing career ==
Ahanotu retired from the NFL in 2005. After retiring, he became the founder of Magellan Entertainment Inc., a talent management firm whose clients included Usain Bolt.
