= Jamir Miller =

American football player (born 1973)

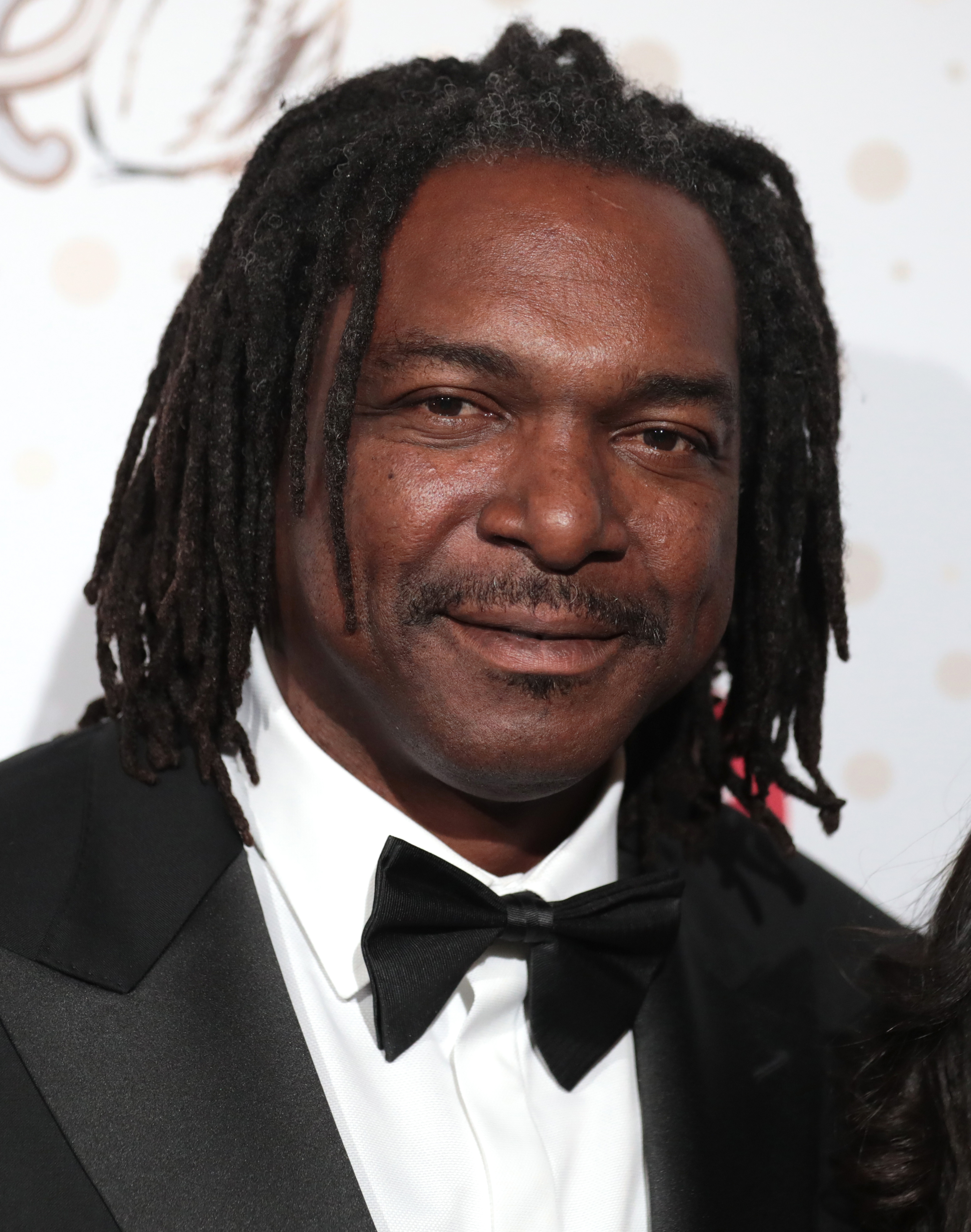
- Miller in 2023

No. 95
- Position: Linebacker

Personal information
- Born: November 19, 1973 (age 52); Philadelphia, Pennsylvania, U.S.
- Listed height: 6 ft 5 in (1.96 m)
- Listed weight: 255 lb (116 kg)

Career information
- High school: El Cerrito (El Cerrito, California)
- College: UCLA
- NFL draft: 1994: 1st round, 10th overall pick

Career history
- Arizona Cardinals (1994–1998); Cleveland Browns (1999–2002)

Awards and highlights
- First-team All-Pro (2001); Pro Bowl (2001); Consensus All-American (1993); First-team All-Pac-10 (1993)

Career NFL statistics
- Tackles: 671
- Sacks: 36
- Forced fumbles: 9
- Interceptions: 2
- Defensive touchdowns: 1
- Stats at Pro Football Reference

Jamir Malik Miller (born November 19, 1973) is an American former professional football player who was a linebacker for nine seasons in the National Football League (NFL). He played college football for the UCLA Bruins, earning consensus All-American honors. A first-round pick in the 1994 NFL draft, he played professionally for the Arizona Cardinals and Cleveland Browns of the NFL.

== Early life ==
Miller was born in Philadelphia, Pennsylvania. He graduated from El Cerrito High School in El Cerrito, California, where he played for the El Cerrito Gauchos high school football team.

== College career ==
Miller attended UCLA, where he played for the UCLA Bruins football team from 1991 through 1993. As a junior in 1993, he was recognized as a consensus first-team All-American, after which he decided to forgo his final year of college eligibility and enter the NFL Draft. He finished his college career with 35 tackles for loss and 23.5 quarterback sacks.

== Professional career ==
Pre-draft measurables
Height	Weight	Arm length	Hand span
6 ft 4 in (1.93 m)	226 lb (103 kg)	34 in (0.86 m)	9 1/2 in (0.24 m)

The Arizona Cardinals selected Miller in the first round (tenth pick overall) of the 1994 NFL draft. He played for the Cardinals from 1994 to 1998. He played for the Cleveland Browns from 1999 to 2001.

On August 10, 2002, in a preseason game against Minnesota, Miller ruptured his right achilles tendon. He attempted to rehab the injury and return the following year, but a middling April 2003 workout (by his admission) and advice from his doctors convinced him to announce his retirement on May 16.

Up until 2007, he was the only Browns player to be selected to the Pro Bowl since the team re-entered the NFL in 1999. In 2007, seven Browns players were nominated to the 2008 Pro Bowl.

Miller was one of four linebackers selected to the Associated Press All-Pro team in 2001. (The other 3 were Jason Gildon, Brian Urlacher, and Ray Lewis.)

== NFL career statistics ==
Legend
	Led the league
**Bold**	Career high

=== Regular season ===
Year	Team	Games		Tackles				Interceptions				Fumbles			
Year	Team	GP	GS	Comb	Solo	Ast	Sck	Int	Yds	TD	Lng	FF	FR	Yds	TD
1994	ARI	16	0	19	16	3	3.0	0	0	0	0	1	0	0	0
1995	ARI	10	9	52	29	23	1.0	0	0	0	0	1	**2**	**26**	0
1996	ARI	16	16	92	55	**37**	1.0	0	0	0	0	0	1	**26**	**1**
1997	ARI	16	16	91	58	33	5.5	0	0	0	0	1	0	0	0
1998	ARI	16	16	113	82	31	3.0	0	0	0	0	2	**2**	0	0
1999	CLE	15	15	**118**	**94**	24	4.5	0	0	0	0	0	0	0	0
2000	CLE	16	16	85	64	21	5.0	**1**	0	0	0	0	0	0	0
2001	CLE	16	16	101	83	18	**13.0**	**1**	0	0	0	**4**	0	0	0
Career		121	104	671	481	190	36.0	2	0	0	0	9	5	52	1

=== Playoffs ===
Year	Team	Games		Tackles				Interceptions				Fumbles			
Year	Team	GP	GS	Comb	Solo	Ast	Sck	Int	Yds	TD	Lng	FF	FR	Yds	TD
1998	ARI	2	2	13	11	2	2.0	0	0	0	0	0	0	0	0
Career		2	2	13	11	2	2.0	0	0	0	0	0	0	0	0
