= Craig Novitsky =

American football player (born 1971)

No. 60
- Position: Guard

Personal information
- Born: May 12, 1971 (age 55); Washington, D.C., U.S.
- Listed height: 6 ft 5 in (1.96 m)
- Listed weight: 295 lb (134 kg)

Career information
- High school: Potomac (Dumfries, Virginia)
- College: UCLA (1990–1993)
- NFL draft: 1994: 5th round, 143rd overall pick

Career history
- New Orleans Saints (1994–1996); St. Louis Rams (1997)*; Baltimore Ravens (1997)*; Denver Broncos (1998)*
- * Offseason or practice squad member only

Awards and highlights
- First-team All-Pac-10 (1993); Second-team All-Pac-10 (1991); Second-team Freshman All-American (1990)

Career NFL statistics
- Games played: 41
- Games started: 10
- Stats at Pro Football Reference

Craig Aaron Novitsky (born May 12, 1971) is an American former professional football player who was a guard for the New Orleans Saints in the National Football League (NFL). He played college football with the UCLA Bruins. As a senior, Novitsky was an all-conference player in the Pacific-10 (now known as the Pac-12). He was drafted by New Orleans in the fifth round of the 1994 NFL draft, and played three seasons with the Saints.

== Early life ==
Novitsky was born in Washington, D.C., and grew up in Woodbridge, Virginia. As a youngster, people would make fun of where he was from, his name, and his height. He attended Potomac High School in Prince William County, Virginia, where he was an all-state offensive lineman.

== College career ==
Novitsky chose to play college ball with UCLA over USC, Duke, Penn State and Rutgers. He set a Bruins record with 46 straight starts, while also becoming the first player in school history to start every game of a four-year career.

He was a redshirt in his first year. After four seniors graduated, he became a starter the following season, when he earned second-team Freshman All-American honors. He was an All-Pac-10 selection as a senior in 1993. Normally a left guard, he also played at center and left tackle that season. Due to injuries to teammates, he started at three different positions over three straight weeks.

== Professional career ==
The New Orleans Saints selected Novitsky in the fifth round of the 1994 NFL draft with the 143rd overall pick. He played three seasons with the Saints, appearing in 41 games with 10 starts.

After his playing career, he became a financial services manager with a Lexus car dealer in Alexandria, Virginia.
