= Bjorn Merten =

No. 37
- Position: Placekicker

Career information
- High school: Centreville (Clifton, Virginia)
- College: UCLA

Career history
- 1993–1996: UCLA Bruins

Awards and highlights
- Consensus All-American (1993); 2× First-team All-Pac-10 (1993, 1996)

Bjorn Merten is an American former college football placekicker who played for the UCLA Bruins. He was a consensus All-American in 1993 as a freshman.

== Early life ==
Merten attended Centreville High School in Clifton, Virginia. He played both kicker and quarterback in high school. He originally planned on continuing the family tradition of attending the United States Naval Academy. Merten wanted to be a pilot in the Navy but failed a depth perception test. As a result, he decided to instead attend the University of California, Los Angeles.

== College career ==
Merten was a four-year letterman for the UCLA Bruins from 1993 to 1996. He won the starting kicking job only four days before the start of his fresman year. As a freshman in 1993, he converted 20 of 25 field goals and 31 of 34 extra points. He led the Pac-10 in scoring and field goal conversions that year, earning first-team All-Pac-10 honors. Merten was named a consensus All-American for the 1993 season. He scored 12 of 21 field goals and 24 of 26 extra points in 1994. During the 1995 season, he made 10 of 16 field goals and 34 of 35 extra poins. His 34 extra points were the most in the Pac-10 that year. As a senior in 1996, Merten recorded 14 of 19 field goals and 38 of 40 extra points. Merten led the Pac-10 in field goal percentage with 73.7% and in field goals made with 14. He garnered first-team All-Pac-10 recognition for the 1996 season.

== Professional career ==
After going undrafted in the 1997 NFL draft, Merten attended rookie minicamp on a tryout basis with the Washington Redskins but was not signed.
