= Johnnie Morton =

American football player (born 1971)

No. 87, 80, 84
- Position: Wide receiver

Personal information
- Born: October 7, 1971 (age 55); Torrance, California, U.S.
- Listed height: 6 ft 0 in (1.83 m)
- Listed weight: 193 lb (88 kg)

Career information
- High school: South (Torrance)
- College: USC
- NFL draft: 1994: 1st round, 21st overall pick

Career history
- Detroit Lions (1994–2001); Kansas City Chiefs (2002–2004); San Francisco 49ers (2005)

Awards and highlights
- Consensus All-American (1993); Pop Warner Trophy (1993); First-team All-Pac-10 (1993); Second-team All-Pac-10 (1992)

Career NFL statistics
- Receptions: 624
- Receiving yards: 8,719
- Receiving touchdowns: 43
- Stats at Pro Football Reference

Johnnie James Morton Jr. (born October 7, 1971) is an American former professional football player who was a wide receiver in the National Football League (NFL) during the 1990s and 2000s. He played college football for the USC Trojans, earning recognition as an All-American in 1993. Selected by the Detroit Lions in the first round in the 1994 NFL draft, he also played professionally for the Kansas City Chiefs and San Francisco 49ers of the NFL. Morton also had a brief career in mixed martial arts fighting in 2007.

== Early life ==
Morton was born in Torrance, California. He attended South High School in Torrance, California and played for the South High Spartans high school football team.

== College career ==
While attending the University of Southern California, Morton played for the USC Trojans football team from 1990 to 1993. He broke twelve USC team and Pacific-10 Conference records for receptions and receiving yards. Morton was nicknamed "Big Play Morton" by Tom Kelly, and "Johnnie Hero" by USC broadcaster Pete Arbogast, thanks to a game-winning touchdown pass Morton caught in the 1990 USC-UCLA rivalry game—a 23-yard strike from Trojans quarterback Todd Marinovich with 16 seconds left that gave the Trojans a 45–42 come-from-behind victory.

== Professional career ==
Pre-draft measurables
Height	Weight	Arm length	Hand span
5 ft 11 7/8 in (1.83 m)	189 lb (86 kg)	32 in (0.81 m)	10 in (0.25 m)

Detroit selected Morton in the first round (21st overall pick) of the 1994 NFL Draft, and he played for the Lions from 1994 to 2001. He would go on to achieve an important secondary role on a deep Lions' receiving corps that also featured Pro Bowl flanker Herman Moore and veteran Brett Perriman. After learning the ropes as a rookie in 1994, Morton became Detroit's featured slot receiver in 1995 and a key contributor on special teams as a kickoff/punt returner. Morton was part of one of the most prolific offenses in Detroit history that year, as the Lions would rack up 436 total points (second highest in the NFL) and end up with ten victories – appearing in the playoffs for the third straight season. He contributed 44 receptions on that team for 590 yards and eight touchdowns. Perhaps his most memorable game occurred that same season during a classic Thanksgiving Day game in Detroit against the Minnesota Vikings. Moore (127 yards), Perriman (153), and Johnnie Morton (102) all eclipsed the 100-yard receiving mark, and Hall of Fame running back Barry Sanders rushed for 138 yards, and quarterback Scott Mitchell passed for 410 yards in a 44–38 Lions' shootout victory.

After the departure of Perriman, Morton became more of a featured receiver in Detroit's offense in the ensuing years. His best season statistically was during the 1999 season when he had 80 receptions for 1,129 yards on a surprising Lions team that made the playoffs that year, despite the unexpected retirement of Barry Sanders. All told, Morton finished his pro career with 624 receptions for 8719 yards and 43 touchdowns. He currently ranks fourth on Detroit's all-time list in both receptions and yards-receiving, with 469 and 6,499, respectively.

== NFL career statistics ==
Year	Team	GP	Receiving						Fumbles	
Year	Team	GP	Rec	Yds	Avg	Lng	TD	FD	Fum	Lost
1994	DET	14	3	39	13.0	18	1	2	0	0
1995	DET	16	44	590	13.4	32	8	29	0	0
1996	DET	16	55	714	13.0	62	6	31	1	1
1997	DET	16	80	1,057	13.2	73	6	51	2	0
1998	DET	16	69	1,028	14.9	98	2	48	0	0
1999	DET	16	80	1,129	14.1	48	5	52	0	0
2000	DET	16	61	788	12.9	42	3	40	1	1
2001	DET	16	77	1,154	15.0	76	4	58	1	1
2002	KC	14	29	397	13.7	30	1	25	0	0
2003	KC	16	50	740	14.8	50	4	36	0	0
2004	KC	13	55	795	14.5	52	3	38	1	1
2005	SF	13	21	288	13.7	30	0	14	0	0
Career		182	624	8,719	14.0	98	43	424	6	4

== Personal life ==
Morton's older half-brother, Michael Morton, played at UNLV and younger brother, Chad Morton played at USC. The Morton family is of African American and Japanese ethnicity.

Morton had a brief cameo appearance in the movie Jerry Maguire and the television series Moesha.

During the 2001 season, comedian Jay Leno had been poking fun at the Lions' 0–12 record. After the Lions won their first game of the season 27–24 over the Minnesota Vikings, Morton announced that he wanted Leno to "kiss my ass." The following week, Morton appeared as a guest on Leno's Tonight Show.

== Mixed martial arts record ==
Professional record breakdown
1 match	0 wins	1 loss
By knockout	0	1

Res.	Record	Opponent	Method	Event	Date	Round	Time	Location	Notes
Loss	0–1	Bernard Ackah	KO (punch)	K-1 Dynamite!! USA	June 2, 2007	1	0:38	Los Angeles, California, United States	Catchweight (213 lbs) bout. Morton tested positive for elevated testosterone levels.

== See also ==
- List of male mixed martial artists
