= Tommy Thompson (punter) =

American football player (born 1972)

No. 3
- Position: Punter

Personal information
- Born: April 27, 1972 (age 54); Lompoc, California, U.S.
- Listed height: 5 ft 10 in (1.78 m)
- Listed weight: 180 lb (82 kg)

Career information
- College: Oregon
- NFL draft: 1994: undrafted

Career history
- San Francisco 49ers (1995–1997)

Awards and highlights
- First-team All-Pac-10 (1992); 2× Second-team All-Pac-10 (1990, 1993)
- Stats at Pro Football Reference

Tommy Thompson (born April 27, 1972) is an American former professional football player who was a punter for three seasons with the San Francisco 49ers of the National Football League (NFL). He played college football for the Oregon Ducks.
