= Jerrott Willard =

American football player (born 1972)

No. 57
- Position: Linebacker

Personal information
- Born: July 11, 1972 (age 54); Fullerton, California, U.S.
- Listed height: 6 ft 1 in (1.85 m)
- Listed weight: 233 lb (106 kg)

Career information
- High school: Corona del Mar (Newport Beach, California)
- College: California
- NFL draft: 1995: 5th round, 164th overall pick

Career history
- Kansas City Chiefs (1995-1996), (1998)

Awards and highlights
- Second-team All-American (1993); 2× First-team All-Pac-10 (1993, 1994); Second-team All-Pac-10 (1992)
- Stats at Pro Football Reference

Jerrott Michael Willard (born July 11, 1972) is an American former professional football player who was a linebacker for the Kansas City Chiefs of the National Football League (NFL). He played college football for the California Golden Bears. He played in one game for the Chiefs in 1998.

== College career ==
Jerrott Willard was noted by the California Sports Hall of Fame as "one of the most prolific tacklers in Cal history." While playing at the University of California, Berkeley, over four seasons with the Golden Bears, he set a school record for tackles for loss (54), which has since been broken.

== Professional career ==
Following his college career, Willard was taken in the fifth round of the 1995 NFL Draft by the Kansas City Chiefs. Limited by injuries, he would play in one game for the team in 1998.
