= Willie McGinest =

American football player (born 1971)

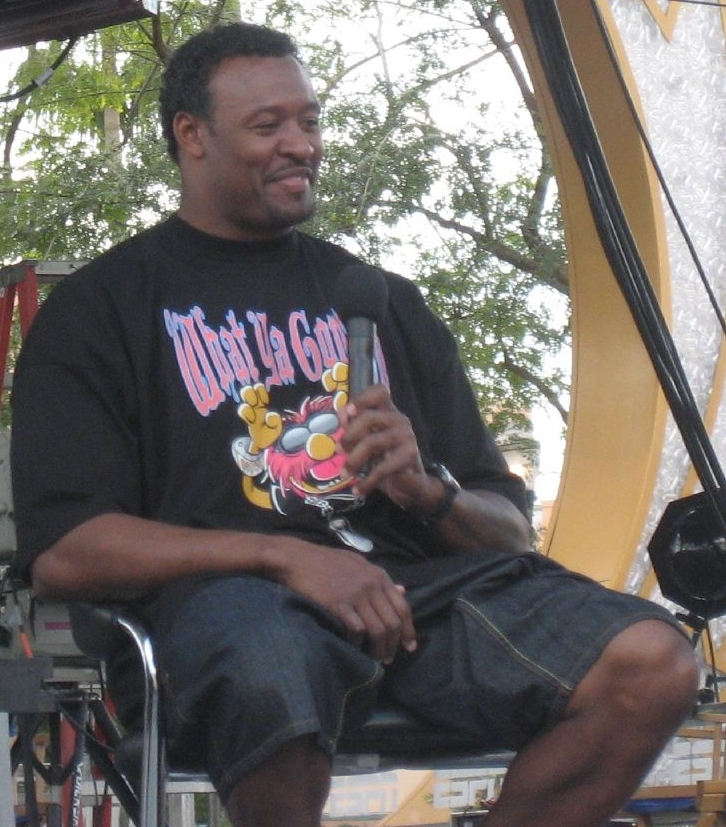
- McGinest at the 2008 ESPN the Weekend event at Disney's Hollywood Studios

No. 55
- Position: Linebacker

Personal information
- Born: December 11, 1971 (age 54); Long Beach, California, U.S.
- Listed height: 6 ft 5 in (1.96 m)
- Listed weight: 270 lb (122 kg)

Career information
- High school: Long Beach Polytechnic
- College: USC (1990–1993)
- NFL draft: 1994: 1st round, 4th overall pick

Career history
- New England Patriots (1994–2005); Cleveland Browns (2006–2008)

Awards and highlights
- 3× Super Bowl champion (XXXVI, XXXVIII, XXXIX); 2× Pro Bowl (1996, 2003); PFWA All-Rookie Team (1994); New England Patriots All-1990s Team; New England Patriots All-2000s Team; New England Patriots All-Dynasty Team; New England Patriots Hall of Fame; 2× First-team All-Pac-10 (1992, 1993); NFL records: Most career postseason sacks: 16; Most sacks in a single postseason game: 4.5

Career NFL statistics
- Tackles: 582
- Sacks: 86
- Interceptions: 5
- Forced fumbles: 16
- Stats at Pro Football Reference

William Lee McGinest Jr. (born December 11, 1971) is an American former professional football linebacker who played in the National Football League (NFL) for 15 seasons, primarily with the New England Patriots. He played college football for the USC Trojans, twice receiving first-team All-Pac-10 honors, and was selected fourth overall by the Patriots in the 1994 NFL draft. During his 12 seasons with the team, he was named to two Pro Bowls and won three Super Bowl titles. McGinest also holds the postseason record for sacks. For his accomplishments in New England, he was inducted to the Patriots Hall of Fame in 2015.

== Early life ==
The second of four children, McGinest attended Long Beach Polytechnic High School, where he garnered all-state honors in football and basketball. In football, he earned All-American recognition from Super Prep, Blue Chip, and Tom Lemming magazines and was selected to several all-star teams, earning all-city, all-state, and all-region honors as a linebacker in 1989. He totaled 107 tackles, including 18 sacks, two fumble recoveries, four passes defended, including an interception, and blocked four kicks as a senior. In 2009, McGinest was elected to Poly's Football Hall of Fame. On the court, he earned Long Beach Press-Telegram "Best in the West," All-CIF Southern Section and all-league honors while averaging 14 points per game during the 1989–90 season.

== College career ==
From 1990 to 1993, McGinest played football at the University of Southern California. He wore number 55. McGinest earned all-conference honors three straight years and All-American acclaim. During his senior year, he was a Lombardi Award finalist, and earned All-American and All-Pac-10 conference honors. He started every game at weak-side defensive end for the Trojans. McGinest finished his collegiate career with 193 tackles (134 solos), 29 sacks (171 yards), 48 tackles for loss (238 yards), and 26 passes batted away. McGinest received a degree in public administration from USC in 1994.

== Professional career ==
Pre-draft measurables
Height	Weight	Arm length	Hand span	40-yard dash	10-yard split	20-yard split	20-yard shuttle	Vertical jump	Broad jump	Bench press
6 ft 4 1/2 in (1.94 m)	255 lb (116 kg)	34 3/8 in (0.87 m)	10 1/8 in (0.26 m)	4.68 s	1.59 s	2.74 s	4.19 s	34.5 in (0.88 m)	10 ft 6 in (3.20 m)	22 reps
All values from NFL Combine

=== New England Patriots ===
McGinest was selected by the New England Patriots in the first round (fourth overall) of the 1994 NFL draft. He was one of the cornerstones for New England's success in winning the Super Bowl in 2001, 2003, and 2004. He was named to the Pro Bowl twice, in 1996 and 2003. In Super Bowl XXXIX, McGinest was used in a different manner from his regular role. While he usually lined up as an outside linebacker in a 3–4 scheme, the Patriots moved him to the defensive line as a defensive end in an effort to keep Philadelphia quarterback Donovan McNabb from scrambling.

In a 2005 wild card playoff win over the Jacksonville Jaguars, McGinest eclipsed two NFL postseason records—most sacks in a game (4.5) and most career postseason sacks (16), surpassing Bruce Smith. His 78 career sacks rank third all time for the Patriots.

The Patriots released McGinest on March 9, 2006.

=== Cleveland Browns ===
On March 15, 2006, McGinest signed with the Cleveland Browns, reuniting with head coach Romeo Crennel, who was the Patriots' defensive coordinator during McGinest's stint in New England. McGinest signed a three-year deal worth $12 million with $6 million in guarantees and bonuses. He stated in an interview prior to the 2008 season that he would be playing his final year of professional football before retiring in the offseason. In July 2009, he stated that he would like to end his career with the Patriots. On August 5, 2015, he signed a one-day contract with the Patriots during his Patriots Hall of Fame induction ceremony.

=== Patriots franchise records ===
He has the most fumble return touchdowns (2) (tied with five others).

== NFL career statistics ==
Year	Team	GP	Tackles				Fumbles	
Year	Team	GP	Cmb	Solo	Ast	Sck	FF	FR
1994	NE	16	43	29	14	4.5	2	2
1995	NE	16	86	69	17	11.0	4	0
1996	NE	16	67	49	18	9.5	2	2
1997	NE	11	35	25	10	2.0	0	3
1998	NE	9	29	20	9	3.5	1	0
1999	NE	16	74	48	26	9.0	1	2
2000	NE	14	63	45	18	6.0	1	2
2001	NE	11	33	25	8	6.0	1	0
2002	NE	16	62	42	20	5.5	0	0
2003	NE	14	67	46	21	5.5	2	2
2004	NE	16	51	36	15	9.5	2	1
2005	NE	16	56	45	11	6.0	0	1
2006	CLE	14	46	37	9	4.0	0	1
2007	CLE	13	30	19	11	3.0	0	1
2008	CLE	14	56	43	13	1.0	0	0
Career		212	798	578	220	86.0	16	17

== NFL Network ==
Following retirement, McGinest joined the NFL Network as a football analyst, and appears on various programs, including NFL Total Access. Prior to joining the NFL Network, McGinest served similar roles at Fox Sports and ESPN. McGinest was suspended from the NFL Network after his 2022 arrest, stemming from an incident in a Los Angeles nightclub.

McGinest was featured on the NFL Network's documentary series A Football Life on October 5, 2018.

== Legal troubles ==
=== 1990 assault trial ===
McGinest and teammates Michael Jones and Jason Oliver were charged with battery and false imprisonment when a female USC student accused them of sexual assault on October 15, 1990. The incident in question occurred on June 20 of the same year. The 23-year-old summer-school counselor said she was dragged into a dormitory room, pinned to a bed, and sexually molested. The players contend the woman entered the room voluntarily and was involved in "horseplay". On June 15, 1991, the three players, including McGinest, were acquitted of all sexual assault and false imprisonment charges.

=== 2016 lawsuit ===
On September 30, 2016, DeAndre Parks filed a Personal Injury Lawsuit against McGinest. The lawsuit claims that McGinest assaulted Parks and threatened him on multiple occasions. His representative denied the charges and the suit was settled in 2020.

=== 2022 nightclub assault ===
On December 9, 2022, at the Delilah nightclub in West Hollywood, McGinest and several of his acquaintances physically assaulted a man who was sitting at a table at the lounge. McGinest can be seen in the video beating the victim and striking the man repeatedly in the head with a glass bottle while the victim was on the floor. McGinest was arrested over the incident and charged with felony assault.

== Charity work ==
McGinest established the Willie McGinest Freedom School, a program that aims to provide social and cultural enrichment for neighborhood youth. On May 3, 2005, the city council of Long Beach declared that every year, May 3 will be recognized as Willie McGinest Day in recognition of his charitable efforts and civic involvement. During the 2004 holiday season, McGinest sponsored "Shop with a Jock", an event that gave 50 Boston-area children the opportunity to go on a $100 shopping spree with his teammates and him. He went on to sponsor a similar event in the Cleveland area with Browns teammates.

== Business and entertainment ventures ==
McGinest owns an entertainment company in Los Angeles called 55 Entertainment.

McGinest also appeared on S.W.A.T. in the season-two episode "The B-Team", playing Los Angeles Fire Department firefighter Ryan Cook when the LAFD goes against the Los Angeles Police Department in a charity competition.

He has had cameo appearances in television shows such as Arli$$ and The Game, and had a small role as a detective in the film I Tried, with rap group Bone Thugs-n-Harmony. He appeared in the Disney XD show Lab Rats & Scorpion as himself.
