= Sean Harris (American football) =

American football player (born 1972)

No. 55
- Position: Linebacker

Personal information
- Born: February 25, 1972 (age 54); Tucson, Arizona, U.S.
- Listed height: 6 ft 3 in (1.91 m)
- Listed weight: 250 lb (113 kg)

Career information
- High school: Tucson Magnet
- College: Arizona
- NFL draft: 1995: 3rd round, 83rd overall pick

Career history
- Chicago Bears (1995–2000); Indianapolis Colts (2001)

Awards and highlights
- Third-team All-American (1993); 2× First-team All-Pac-10 (1993, 1994); Second-team All-Pac-10 (1992)

Career NFL statistics
- Tackles: 249
- Sacks: 2
- Interceptions: 2
- Stats at Pro Football Reference

Sean Harris (born February 25, 1972) is an American former professional football player who was a linebacker in the National Football League (NFL). He was selected by the Chicago Bears in the third round of the 1995 NFL draft. He played college football for the Arizona Wildcats.

Harris also played for the Indianapolis Colts.

Harris' son, Jalen, is a defensive end who currently plays for the Washington Commanders.
