= Rob Waldrop =

American gridiron football player (born 1971)

No. 98, 95, 92
- Position: Defensive tackle

Personal information
- Born: December 1, 1971 (age 54); Atlanta, Georgia, U.S.
- Listed height: 6 ft 1 in (1.85 m)
- Listed weight: 276 lb (125 kg)

Career information
- High school: Horizon (Phoenix, Arizona)
- College: Arizona
- NFL draft: 1994: 5th round, 156th overall pick

Career history
- Kansas City Chiefs (1994); Memphis Mad Dogs (1995); Toronto Argonauts (1996–1997)

Awards and highlights
- 2× Grey Cup champion (1996, 1997); 2× CFL All-Star (1996, 1997); 2× CFL East All-Star (1996, 1997); Outland Trophy (1993); Bronko Nagurski Trophy (1993); UPI Lineman of the Year (1993); Unanimous All-American (1993); Consensus All-American (1992); Pac-10 Defensive Player of the Year (1993); Morris Trophy (1992); 2× First-team All-Pac-10 (1992, 1993); Arizona Wildcats Jersey No. 92 retired

Career NFL statistics
- Tackles: 1
- Stats at Pro Football Reference
- College Football Hall of Fame

Robert F. Waldrop (born December 1, 1971) is an American former professional football player who was a defensive tackle in the National Football League (NFL) and Canadian Football League (CFL). He played college football for the Arizona Wildcats, twice earning consensus All-American honors, including a unanimous selection in 1993. Waldrop played professionally for the NFL's Kansas City Chiefs, and the Memphis Mad Dogs and Toronto Argonauts of the CFL. He is a member of the College Football Hall of Fame.

== Early life ==
Waldrop was born in Atlanta, Georgia. He attended Horizon High School in Scottsdale, Arizona, where he played for the Horizon Huskies high school football team.

== College career ==
While attending the University of Arizona, Waldrop played for the Arizona Wildcats football team from 1990 to 1993. He was recognized as a consensus first-team All-American in 1992 and 1993. He was also the recipient of the Outland Trophy as the best interior lineman in the country, the Nagurski Award as the best defensive player, and United Press International's Lineman of the Year award. He was inducted into the College Football Hall of Fame in 2011.

== Professional career ==
The Kansas City Chiefs selected Waldrop in the fifth round of the 1994 NFL draft. He played for the Chiefs in three regular season games in 1994. He played for the CFL's Memphis Mad Dogs in 1995, and for the CFL's Toronto Argonauts in 1996 and 1997. He gained his greatest recognition with the Argos, when he was a member of their back-to-back Grey Cup championship teams in 1996 and 1997, and was selected as a CFL All-Star in both years.
