= Ernest Jones (defensive lineman) =

American football player (born 1971)

No. 59, 72, 95
- Positions: Defensive end, defensive tackle

Personal information
- Born: April 1, 1971 (age 55); Utica, New York, U.S.
- Listed height: 6 ft 2 in (1.88 m)
- Listed weight: 255 lb (116 kg)

Career information
- High school: Utica
- College: Oregon
- NFL draft: 1994: 3rd round, 100th overall pick

Career history
- Los Angeles Rams (1994); New Orleans Saints (1995); Denver Broncos (1996–1998); New Orleans Saints (1998); Carolina Panthers (1998–1999)

Awards and highlights
- 2× Super Bowl champion (XXXII, XXXIII); Second-team All-Pac-10 (1993)

Career NFL statistics
- Tackles: 25
- Sacks: 3.5
- Stats at Pro Football Reference

Ernest Lee Jones (born April 1, 1971) is an American former professional football player who was a defensive lineman for four seasons for the New Orleans Saints, Denver Broncos, and Carolina Panthers of the National Football League (NFL). He was selected in the third round of the 1994 NFL draft by the Los Angeles Rams.

Pre-draft measurables
| Height | Weight | Arm length | Hand span | 40-yard dash | 10-yard split | 20-yard split | 20-yard shuttle | Vertical jump | Broad jump | Bench press |
|---|---|---|---|---|---|---|---|---|---|---|
| 6 ft 2 1/8 in (1.88 m) | 239 lb (108 kg) | 32 3/8 in (0.82 m) | 9 1/4 in (0.23 m) | 4.73 s | 1.63 s | 2.76 s | 4.35 s | 29.5 in (0.75 m) | 9 ft 2 in (2.79 m) | 23 reps |
All values from NFL Combine
