= Eric Mahlum =

American football player and coach (born 1970)

No. 63, 65
- Position: Guard

Personal information
- Born: December 6, 1970 (age 55); San Diego, California, U.S.
- Listed height: 6 ft 4 in (1.93 m)
- Listed weight: 285 lb (129 kg)

Career information
- High school: Pacific Grove (CA)
- College: California
- NFL draft: 1994: 2nd round, 32nd overall pick

Career history

Playing
- Indianapolis Colts (1994–1997)

Coaching
- Liberty High School (2005–2023) Head coach

Awards and highlights
- First-team All-Pac-10 (1993)

Career NFL statistics
- Games played: 36
- Games started: 18
- Fumble recoveries: 3
- Stats at Pro Football Reference

Eric Arnold Mahlum (born December 6, 1970) is an American former professional football player who played his entire career as an offensive guard for the Indianapolis Colts of the National Football League (NFL) from 1994 to 1997. He played college football for the California Golden Bears and was selected in the second round of the 1994 NFL draft with the 32nd overall pick. Mahlum was the Football coach at Liberty High School in Hillsboro Oregon from 2008 to 2023. He had a 92–89 record.
