= Tony Bouie =

American football player (born 1972)

No. 23
- Position: Safety

Personal information
- Born: August 7, 1972 (age 54); New Orleans, Louisiana, U.S.
- Listed height: 5 ft 10 in (1.78 m)
- Listed weight: 188 lb (85 kg)

Career information
- High school: Holy Cross School (New Orleans)
- College: Arizona
- NFL draft: 1995: undrafted

Career history
- Tampa Bay Buccaneers (1995–1998)

Awards and highlights
- Consensus All-American (1994); 2× First-team All-Pac-10 (1993, 1994)

Career NFL statistics
- Games played: 57
- Games started: 4
- Tackles: 40
- Fumbles recovered: 2
- Interceptions: 1
- Stats at Pro Football Reference

Tony Vanderson Bouie (born August 7, 1972) is an American former professional football player who was a safety for four seasons in the National Football League (NFL). He played college football for the Arizona Wildcats, earning consensus All-American honors in 1994. He played professionally for the NFL's Tampa Bay Buccaneers.

== Early life ==
Bouie was born and raised in New Orleans, Louisiana. He attended Holy Cross School in New Orleans, and played for the Holy Cross Tigers high school football team.

== College career ==
While attending the University of Arizona, he played for the Arizona Wildcats football team from 1991 to 1994. Bouie was a key member of the Wildcats' Pacific-10 Conference championship team in 1993, which defeated the Miami Hurricanes in the Fiesta Bowl. He was recognized as a consensus All-American and first-team All-Pac-10 selection at defensive back following his senior season in 1994, and was featured on the cover of Sports Illustrated magazine. He also played for the Arizona Wildcats baseball team, and was a member of the Wildcats' Pac-10 championship baseball teams in 1992 and 1993.

Bouie graduated from the University of Arizona with a Bachelor of Arts degree in media arts. He was inducted into the University of Arizona Sports Hall of Fame in 2000, and his name is included among other Wildcats football greats in the Ring of Honor on the facade of Arizona Stadium.

== Professional career ==
He signed with the Tampa Bay Buccaneers as an undrafted free agent in 1995, and played for the Buccaneers from 1995 to 1998. In four NFL seasons, he played in 57 regular season games with the Buccaneers and started four of them.

== Life after football ==
Bouie began work on his first master's degree while playing for the Arizona Wildcats, and graduated from the University of Arizona with a Master of Arts in literacy and education in 1997. He graduated from Arizona State University's W. P. Carey School of Business with a Master of Business Administration (MBA) in 2005. While completing his MBA degree requirements, he wrote a business plan for the development of a stackable cup that dispenses with an attached lid. He raised capital for the manufacture and marketing of his idea, and is a former chief executive officer of Halo Cups, Inc., the distributor of the "SwoopCup."

He is a former board member of the Leukemia & Lymphoma Society and the National Football League Players' Association. He used to be the vice president of the University of Arizona Maricopa County Black Alumni Association, and was a national board member for the University of Arizona alumni association.

He is a cancer survivor, having been diagnosed with stage 4 lymphoma in 2007. He underwent successful chemotherapy in the spring of 2008.

In 2010, Bouie ran as a Republican candidate for the Arizona State Senate in District 4, which encompasses northwest Phoenix, surrounding suburbs, and much of rural northwestern Maricopa County.

Bouie received his first master's degree while playing in the NFL. In 1997, he received a MA in Literacy and Education from the University of Arizona. He received his third masters while coaching college football at the University of Akron in Ohio. Bouie was a defensive graduate assistant during the 2011 football season. He coached and received a MS in Sports Administration.

Bouie lives in Phoenix, Arizona, with his wife and four children. He is an active member of Christ Church of the Valley in Peoria. Bouie has a bucket list with items that include bungee jumping, skydiving, and climbing Mount Kilimanjaro.
