= Eric Zomalt =

American football player (born 1972)

No. 27, 23
- Position: Safety

Personal information
- Born: August 9, 1972 (age 54); Los Angeles, California, U.S.
- Listed height: 5 ft 11 in (1.80 m)
- Listed weight: 201 lb (91 kg)

Career information
- High school: Canyon Springs (Moreno Valley, California)
- College: California
- NFL draft: 1994: 3rd round, 103rd overall pick

Career history
- Philadelphia Eagles (1994–1996); New York Jets (1996)

Awards and highlights
- First-team All-Pac-10 (1993)

Career NFL statistics
- Tackles: 28
- Stats at Pro Football Reference

Eric Lee Zomalt (born August 9, 1972) is an American former professional football player who was a safety in the National Football League (NFL). He was selected by the Philadelphia Eagles in the third round of the 1994 NFL draft and played for the team from 1994 to 1996. He played for the New York Jets in 1996. He played college football for the California Golden Bears.

== Early life ==
Zomalt attended Canyon Springs High School in Moreno Valley, California. In 1989, Zomalt was named CIF Division 5 Player of the Year and state 2A Player of the Year in football.

== College career ==
Zomalt started at safety at the University of California, Berkeley, for the Golden Bears.

== Professional career ==
Pre-draft measurables
Height	Weight	Arm length	Hand span	40-yard dash	10-yard split	20-yard split	20-yard shuttle	Vertical jump	Broad jump	Bench press
5 ft 11 1/2 in (1.82 m)	197 lb (89 kg)	30 in (0.76 m)	9 1/2 in (0.24 m)	4.62 s	1.61 s	2.67 s	4.41 s	33.0 in (0.84 m)	10 ft 0 in (3.05 m)	18 reps

Zomalt was selected by the Philadelphia Eagles in the third round (103rd overall) of the 1994 NFL draft. Against the Oakland Raiders in 1995, Zomalt started in his first game after Mike Zordich became injured. He became the starting free safety for the Eagles to begin the 1996 season, but the play of rookie Brian Dawkins forced the coaching staff to bench him after two weeks. Zomalt was released on September 18, 1996. He was quickly signed by the New York Jets the same day. Zomalt started one game for the Jets at free safety, the season finale against the Miami Dolphins. After the 1996 season, Zomalt became a restricted free agent, but the Jets did not extend a qualifying offer to him, making him an unrestricted free agent. He did not sign with another team after his stint with the Jets.

== Coaching career ==
Zomalt and his brother, Greg, coached together at San Leandro High School in San Leandro, California, Moreno Valley High School, Canyon Springs High School, and Citrus Hill High School in Perris, California, where Zomalt has been the head coach since 2010.
