= Danny O'Neil =

American football player (born 1971)

No. 16
- Position: Quarterback

Personal information
- Born: August 4, 1971 (age 55); Fullerton, California, U.S.

Career information
- College: Oregon (1991–1995)

Awards and highlights
- 1994 Pac-10 Conference champion; First-team All-Pac-10 (1994); Rose Bowl Hall of Fame inductee (2003)

Danny O'Neil (born August 4, 1971) is an American former football quarterback.

O'Neil was a star high school quarterback at Mater Dei in Orange County, California and was heavily recruited by Alabama and USC but chose to play for Rich Brooks at the University of Oregon.

Despite being a four-year starter who set numerous passing records for the Ducks, O'Neil struggled throughout his career in Eugene. However, in 1994 O'Neil led the Ducks to the Pac-10 championship and a berth in the 1995 Rose Bowl, Oregon's first since 1958. Though the Ducks lost to #2 Penn State 38–20, O'Neil set Rose Bowl records for most passes completed (41), most attempts (61), most yardage (465), most plays (74), and most total offense (456 yards), and was named the game's co-MVP with Penn State's Ki-Jana Carter. He was named to the Rose Bowl Hall of Fame in 2003.

O'Neil was named first team all-conference as a senior, leading the Ducks to three pivotal come-from-behind victories; defeating #9 Washington, #11 Arizona, and archrival Oregon State in order to win the Pac-10 Conference championship. He passed for 8,301 yards and 62 touchdowns in his career at Oregon and also led the Ducks to the 1992 Independence Bowl.

O'Neil was not drafted into the National Football League. He played part of one season with the Anaheim Piranhas of the Arena Football League before retiring from football to become a youth pastor. Through the years he founded a church, Calvary Fellowship, in Eugene, OR. There he met his wife, Kim Nguyen/O'Neil. They soon got married and had two kids, Taylor O'Neil (b. 2004) and Danny Rayden O'Neil (b. 2005). He was a pastor in Eugene, Oregon, where he has ministered to players from his former team. He currently resides in Eugene, Oregon.
