= Matthew Slater =

American football player (born 1985)

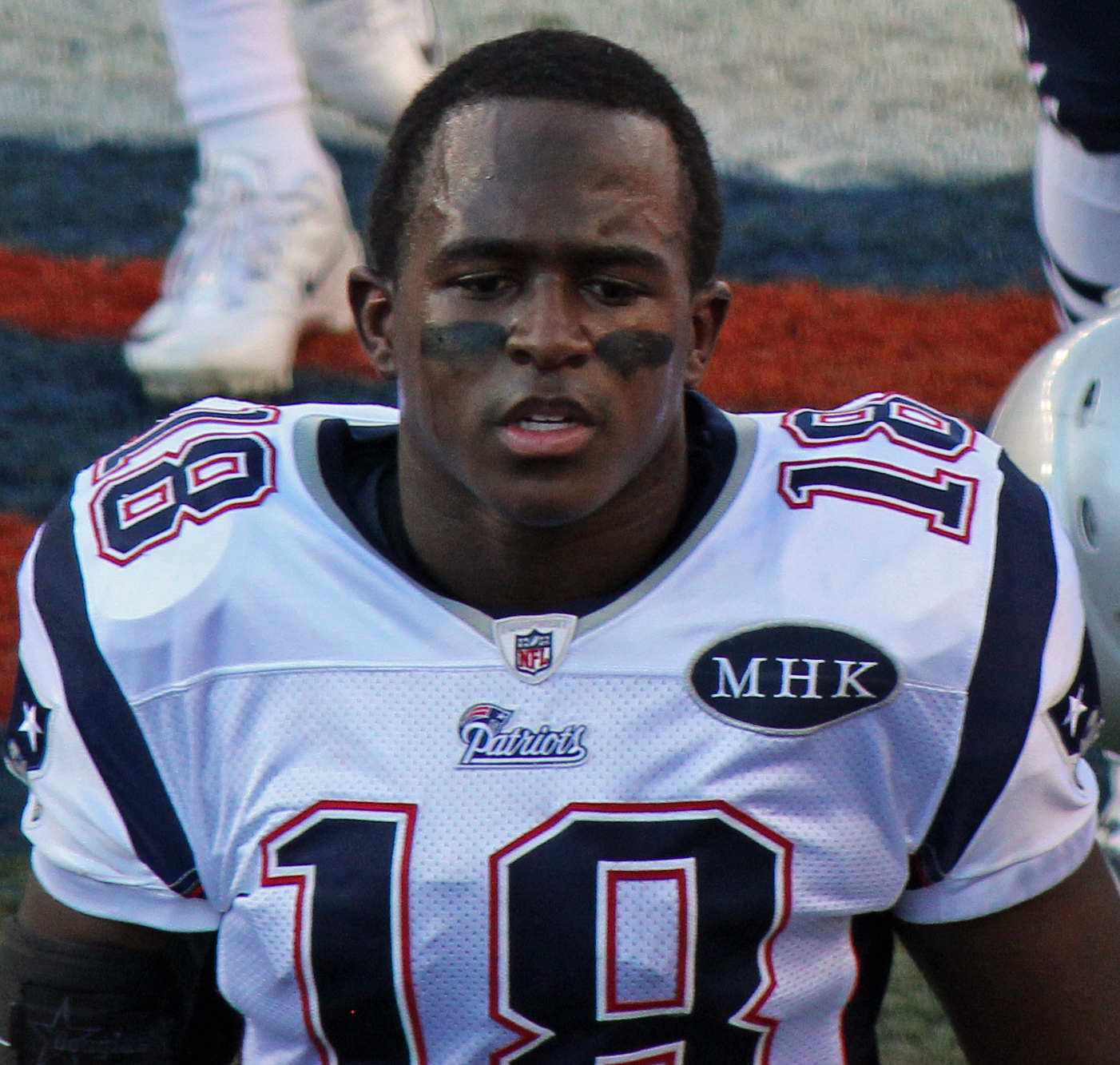
- Slater with the New England Patriots in 2011

No. 18
- Position: Wide receiver

Personal information
- Born: September 9, 1985 (age 41); Long Beach, California, U.S.
- Listed height: 6 ft 0 in (1.83 m)
- Listed weight: 205 lb (93 kg)

Career information
- High school: Servite (Anaheim, California)
- College: UCLA (2004–2007)
- NFL draft: 2008: 5th round, 153rd overall pick

Career history

Playing
- New England Patriots (2008–2023)

Coaching
- New England Patriots (2024) Special assistant to the head coach; Boston College High School (2026) Assistant Head Coach for Leadership and Player Development

Awards and highlights
- As a player: 3× Super Bowl champion (XLIX, LI, LIII); 2× First-team All-Pro (2016, 2019); 3× Second-team All-Pro (2017, 2020, 2021); 10× Pro Bowl (2011–2017, 2019–2021); New England Patriots All-2010s Team; New England Patriots All-Dynasty Team; First-team All-Pac-10 (2007)

Career NFL statistics
- Receptions: 1
- Receiving yards: 46
- Tackles: 191
- Forced fumbles: 1
- Fumble recoveries: 1
- Return yards: 637
- Total touchdowns: 1
- Blocked punts: 1
- Stats at Pro Football Reference

Matthew Wilson Slater (born September 9, 1985) is an American former professional football wide receiver who played in the National Football League (NFL) for 16 seasons with the New England Patriots. A special teams player for most of his career, Slater is considered one of the greatest gunners of all time.

Slater played college football for the UCLA Bruins, earning first-team All-Pac-10 honors in 2007. He was selected by the Patriots in the fifth round of the 2008 NFL draft. Slater holds the record for special teams Pro Bowl selections at 10, which he set between 2011 and 2021. Slater also received two first-team All-Pro selections and won three Super Bowl titles. Following his retirement as a player, Slater served as a coaching assistant for the Patriots in 2024.

== Early life ==
Slater was born in Long Beach, California, to Annie and Pro Football Hall of Fame player Jackie Slater. He has a brother named David.

Slater lettered in football for two seasons at Servite High School in Anaheim, California, where he was teammates with Ryan Kalil. Slater was an All-West selection by Prep Star and a three-star selection by Rivals.com. He was also a two-time All-Serra League selection. As a junior, Slater caught 23 passes for 333 yards and two touchdowns. As a senior, he had 39 receptions for 707 yards and five touchdowns.

In high school, Slater was also a standout track athlete. He tied for second at the California Interscholastic Federation (CIF) State meet in the 100 meters, with a time of 10.62 seconds, and fourth in the 200 meters, with a time of 21.39 seconds. Slater's 4 × 100 metres relay team was the CIF champion. He was selected as the 2003 Orange County Register Boys Track and Field Athlete of the Year as a senior. Slater still holds school records in the 100 meters and 200 meters.

== College career ==
Slater attended the University of California, Los Angeles and majored in political science and history, while playing for the Bruins football team. As a freshman, he redshirted due to a turf toe injury.

As a freshman redshirt in 2004, Slater appeared in games against Illinois, Arizona, and Stanford.

As a sophomore in 2005, Slater was a reserve wide receiver. He missed the first three games due to a stress fracture in his left leg. Slater played in two games but did not make a reception.

As a junior in 2006, Slater played 13 games, including two (against Washington and Arizona) on defense. He excelled on kick coverage, specializing in big hits on kick returners to help minimize kick return yardage. Slater made nine tackles, including six solo tackles.

As a senior in 2007, Slater played in 13 games and made 25 tackles. He also returned 34 kicks for a 29-yard average and three touchdowns which tied the lead in the nation and set the UCLA record. Slater also tied the Pac-10 season record, set by Anthony Davis in 1974. Slater's 29-yard kickoff return average was first in the Pac-10 and 12th-best in the country. He was a first-team All-Pac-10 selection as the kick returner. Slater's 986 kickoff return yards were also a new UCLA single-season record.

== Professional career ==
Pre-draft measurables
Height	Weight	40-yard dash	10-yard split	20-yard split	20-yard shuttle	Three-cone drill	Vertical jump	Broad jump	Bench press
5 ft 10 5/8 in (1.79 m)	195 lb (88 kg)	4.44 s	1.57 s	2.59 s	4.40 s	7.31 s	33.0 in (0.84 m)	10 ft 1 in (3.07 m)	11 reps
All values from Pro Day

=== 2008 ===
Slater was selected in the fifth round (153rd overall) of the 2008 NFL draft by the New England Patriots, who traded up with the Tampa Bay Buccaneers before drafting Slater. His father, Jackie Slater, was pleased with the selection and told the Boston Herald that he received phone calls from "scouts, administrators in the NFL who knew me and my son, and they said, 'Jackie, this could not be a better fit for your son to start being a pro football player.'" Slater was one of two players selected in the 2008 Draft (the other being Chris Long), and the sixth in the history of the NFL Draft, who is a son of a Hall of Fame member.

Slater played in 14 games as a rookie, returning 11 kickoffs for 155 yards and recording 12 tackles on special teams.

=== 2009 ===
In the 2009 season, Slater was active for 14 games for the Patriots, recording six tackles on special teams, while recording one rush for six yards as a wide receiver. He also returned 11 kickoffs for 269 yards, a 24.5 average. Slater had a career-high 35-yard kickoff return in the regular-season finale against the Houston Texans. He also played in a reserve role at wide receiver and on special teams coverage units in the postseason game against the Baltimore Ravens. In that game, Slater had two kickoff returns for 46 yards and a special teams tackle.

=== 2010 ===
In 2010, Slater did not record any offensive or defensive statistics and did not return any kicks or punts. However, he led the team with 21 special teams tackles in 15 games played.

=== 2011 ===
In the 2011 season, Slater was voted to be the special teams captain by his teammates.

Slater created a niche as a special teams force, leading the Patriots with 17 regular season special teams tackles. However, he had a presence in all three phases throughout the season. In the season opener against the Miami Dolphins, Slater made the Patriots' first big play of the season by catching a 46-yard reception from Tom Brady (which was his only career reception) and set the team up for the Patriots’ first touchdown of the season. Slater returned four kickoffs for 68 yards (averaging 17 yards per return). He significantly contributed in the defensive backfield, and started in three games as safety. In his defensive start against the Indianapolis Colts, Slater forced a fumble and finished the game with a team-high six tackles. In the AFC Divisional Round, Slater had a special teams tackle.

Slater was selected for the 2012 Pro Bowl and the 2011 Pro Football Writers Association (PFW/PFWA) All-Pro teams including All-NFL and All-AFC as a special teamer. At the time, the Slaters were one of five active father-son families selected to at least one Pro Bowl apiece. The others were Gill and Jairus Byrd; Archie and Eli Manning; Archie and Peyton Manning; Clay and Clay Matthews; and Howie and Kyle Long. The Patriots reached Super Bowl XLVI, Slater's first appearance in the Super Bowl, but lost 21–17 to the New York Giants.

=== 2012 ===
Slater, who became a free agent after the 2011 season, signed a three-year contract to return to the Patriots in 2012. He was again voted as Special Teams Captain and voted to be the team's player representative to the NFL Players Association. Slater was also named to the Pro Bowl and the 2012 PFW/PFWA All-Pro for the lone AFC special teamer position for the second straight season.

=== 2013 ===
In his sixth season with the Patriots, Slater continued to be a reliable captain and inspirational leader on and off the field. He had 14 regular season special-teams tackles, which was the second-highest on the team, despite missing four games early in the season due to injury. Slater's on-field performance led to a third straight Pro Bowl nomination.

=== 2014 ===
On November 26, 2014, it was reported that Slater signed a two-year contract extension to remain with the Patriots through the 2016 season. Slater was again voted All-Pro and to the Pro Bowl at the special teams position. It was his fourth straight selection to the Pro Bowl and his third All-Pro nod. Slater earned a Super Bowl ring as the Patriots defeated the Seattle Seahawks by a score of 28–24 in Super Bowl XLIX.

=== 2015 ===
Slater was once again a standout special teams player in 2015. He earned his fifth Pro Bowl at the special teams position. Slater's father is a seven-time Pro Bowler, and with 12 Pro Bowl nods between them at the time, the Slaters were the second-most nominated father/son in the NFL (only Archie and Peyton Manning had more Pro Bowl nominations).

=== 2016 ===
On August 31, 2016, Slater signed a one-year contract extension with the Patriots through 2017.

Slater continued to be a standout on special teams. On December 20, he earned his sixth Pro Bowl nomination. The Slaters now held the most Pro Bowl nods of an active father-son pair with 13. He was also named First-team All-Pro as a special teamer for the fourth time in his career. On January 4, 2017, Slater was announced as the winner of the Bart Starr Award, given annually to a player who exemplifies character and leadership on and off the field. His father received this honor in 1996, and together they became the first father-son pair to be honored with this prestigious award. Slater helped the Patriots finish with a 14–2 record. On February 5, 2017, he was part of the Patriots team that won Super Bowl LI. In the game, the Patriots defeated the Atlanta Falcons by a score of 34–28 in overtime. Slater had a role as special teams captain and successfully called the coin toss before overtime began.

=== 2017 ===
Slater was inactive for the first four games of 2017, recovering from a hamstring injury. He returned in Week 5 but missed Weeks 11–13 with a hamstring injury. Slater was named to a record seven consecutive Pro Bowls, which tied Steve Tasker for the most special teams Pro Bowl honors in NFL history. Slater did not play in the Pro Bowl because the Patriots made it to Super Bowl LII, but failed to repeat as champions after losing 41–33 to the Philadelphia Eagles. He received the Bart Starr Award as the player who best exemplifies character and leadership on and off the field.

=== 2018 ===
On March 20, 2018, Slater re-signed with the Patriots on a two-year contract. Slater won his third Super Bowl when the Patriots defeated the Los Angeles Rams by a score of 13–3 in Super Bowl LIII.

=== 2019 ===
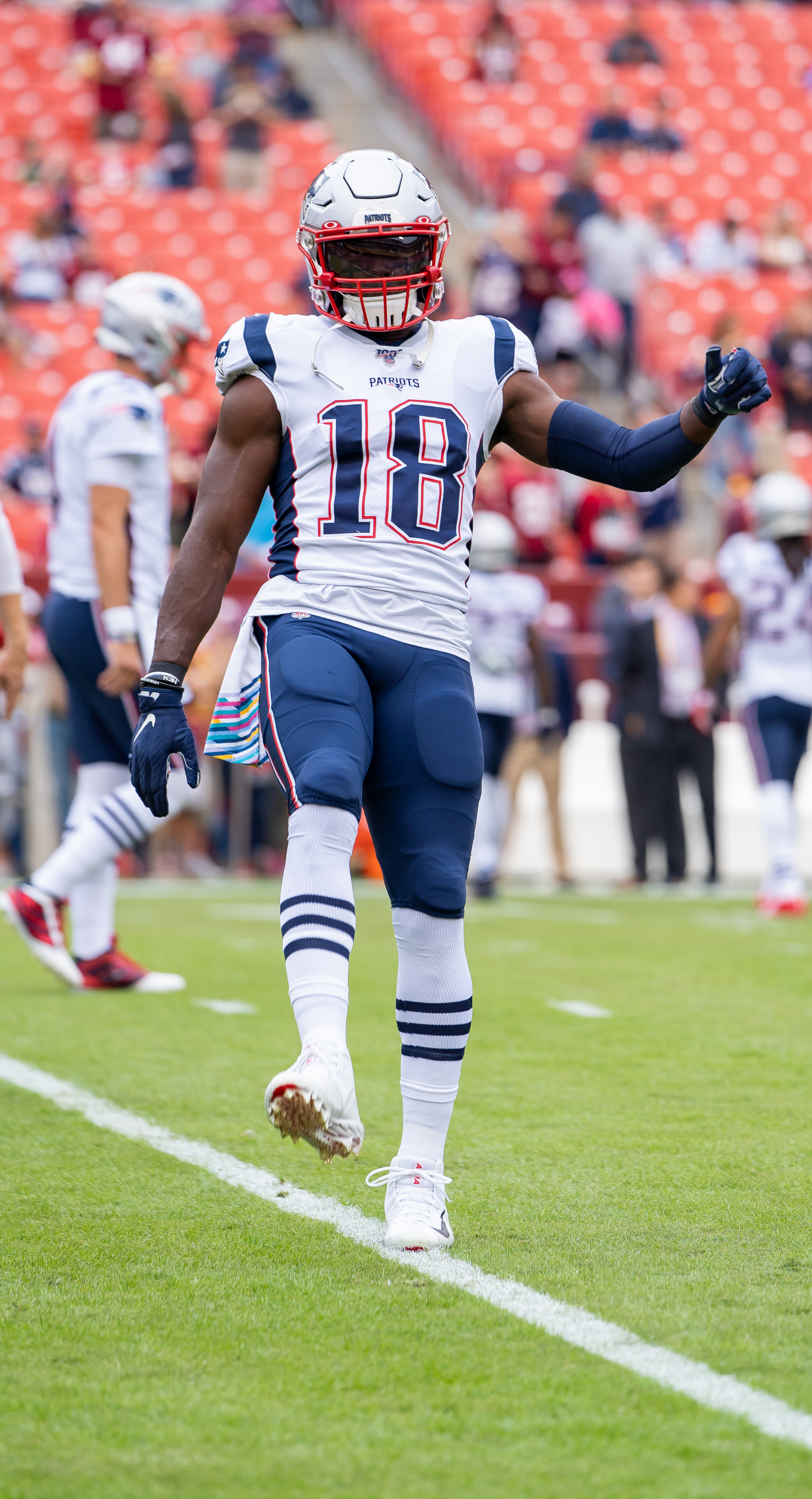
Slater in 2019

During a Week 4 16–10 road victory over the Buffalo Bills, Slater scored his first and only NFL touchdown on an 11-yard blocked punt return. During Week 12, Slater had his first career blocked punt, which led to an offensive touchdown, in a 13–9 victory over the Dallas Cowboys, earning AFC Special Teams Player of the Week honors. Slater was named to his eighth Pro Bowl, breaking Steve Tasker's record for the most special teams Pro Bowl honors in NFL history.

=== 2020 ===
On March 13, 2020, Slater signed a two-year contract extension with the Patriots. With quarterback Tom Brady's departure and the release of placekicker Stephen Gostkowski, Slater became the longest active member of the Patriots. On December 21, he was named to the 2020 Pro Bowl, extending his own NFL record for most special teams Pro Bowl honors, with nine selections.

=== 2021 ===
Slater was a standout on special teams once more in the 2021 season. He ended the year with 11 tackles in the regular season in all 17 regular season games while adding another two in the Patriots' Wild Card Round loss to the Bills. Slater made his tenth Pro Bowl and was a Second-team All-Pro selection for the third time in his career. He was also the recipient of the Art Rooney Award.

=== 2022 ===
On March 14, 2022, Slater signed a one-year contract extension with the Patriots. He played in all 17 games, appearing in a large majority of the special teams snaps over the season.

=== 2023 ===
Slater signed another one-year contract extension on February 17, 2023.

When then-head coach of the Patriots, Bill Belichick, was asked who the greatest player at each phase of the game was, he said that Slater was the greatest in the special teams department.

=== Retirement ===
On February 20, 2024, Slater announced his retirement from football.

== Coaching career ==
During the 2024 offseason, Slater was hired by the New England Patriots new head coach Jerod Mayo to be on his staff in a "right-hand man" capacity. Slater was a teammate of Mayo for his entire career; both were drafted by New England in the 2008 NFL draft. Slater's long time as a special teams captain and as an excellent special teams player was used to support Mayo with football team building and player development. Mayo later stated that Slater would work as one of his advisors with his official title being "special assistant to the head coach". Slater was not retained after Mayo's firing and the hiring of new head coach Mike Vrabel.

== Personal life ==
In 2020, Slater and his wife founded the Slater Family Foundation. Slater is a Christian.

In 2013, Slater was awarded the New England Patriots 11th Ron Burton Community Service Award by owner Robert Kraft for his strong commitment to community service and leadership. Slater is one of the team's most active community participants, regularly participating in the team's organized community events.

Slater was also the United Way representative on the New England Patriots and worked with organizations in the greater Boston area to recruit one million volunteers as part of the wider Patriots Celebrate Volunteerism campaign in 2012.

On October 25, 2016, Slater hosted a "pop-up" fundraiser to benefit Hurricane Matthew victims. He raised over $60,000 for Samaritan's Purse to assist in their efforts in the Carolinas and Haiti after the devastating hurricane barreled through those regions.

Slater is a supporter of Compassion International. In 2021, he picked the charity and its “Fill The Stadium” initiative for his “My Cause My Cleats” cause.

== See also ==
- National Football League team captains
- Gunner (American football)
- 2007 College Football All-America Team
- List of second generation National Football League players
