= 2004 Arizona State Sun Devils football team =

American college football season

2004 Arizona State Sun Devils football

Sun Bowl champion

Sun Bowl, W 27–23 vs. Purdue
- Conference: Pacific-10 Conference

Ranking
- Coaches: No. 20
- AP: No. 19
- Record: 9–3 (5–3 Pac-10)
- Head coach: Dirk Koetter (4th season)
- Defensive coordinator: Brent Guy (4th season)
- Captains: Drew Hodgdon; Ishmael Thrower; Jimmy Verdon; Andrew Walter
- Home stadium: Sun Devil Stadium

Uniform

2004 Pacific-10 Conference football standings
| | Conf. | | | Overall |
| Team | W | | L | W | | L |
|---|---|---|---|---|---|---|
| No. 1 USC † $ | 8 | – | 0 | 13 | – | 0 |
| No. 9 California | 7 | – | 1 | 10 | – | 2 |
| No. 19 Arizona State | 5 | – | 3 | 9 | – | 3 |
| Oregon State | 5 | – | 3 | 7 | – | 5 |
| UCLA | 4 | – | 4 | 6 | – | 6 |
| Oregon | 4 | – | 4 | 5 | – | 6 |
| Washington State | 3 | – | 5 | 5 | – | 6 |
| Stanford | 2 | – | 6 | 4 | – | 7 |
| Arizona | 2 | – | 6 | 3 | – | 8 |
| Washington | 0 | – | 8 | 1 | – | 10 |
$ – Conference champion; † – USC later vacated 2 wins (1 in conference), as well as the BCS and Pac-10 championships, due to NCAA sanctions.; Rankings from AP Poll

The 2004 Arizona State Sun Devils football team represented Arizona State University as a member of the Pacific-10 Conference (Pac-10) during the 2004 NCAA Division I-A football season. Led by fourth-year head coach Dirk Koetter, the Sun Devils compiled an overall record of 9–3 with a mark of 5–3 in conference play, tying for third place in the Pac-10. Arizona State was invited to the Sun Bowl, where the Sun Devils defeated Purdue. The team played home games at Sun Devil Stadium in Tempe, Arizona.

== Schedule ==
| Date | Time | Opponent | Rank | Site | TV | Result | Attendance | Source |
|---|---|---|---|---|---|---|---|---|
| September 2 | 7:00 pm | UTEP* | | Sun Devil Stadium; Tempe, AZ | FSNAZ | W 49–9 | 57,528 | |
| September 11 | 9:00 am | at Northwestern* | | Ryan Field; Evanston, IL | ESPN2 | W 30–21 | 21,939 | |
| September 18 | 7:30 pm | No. 16 Iowa* | | Sun Devil Stadium; Tempe, AZ | FSNAZ | W 44–7 | 71,706 | |
| September 25 | 7:15 pm | Oregon State | No. 22 | Sun Devil Stadium; Tempe, AZ | FSN | W 27–14 | 63,312 | |
| October 2 | 7:15 pm | at Oregon | No. 21 | Autzen Stadium; Eugene, OR | TBS | W 28–13 | 58,208 | |
| October 16 | 12:30 pm | at No. 1 USC | No. 15 | Los Angeles Memorial Coliseum; Los Angeles, CA | ABC | L 7–45 | 90,211 | |
| October 23 | 12:30 pm | UCLA | No. 21 | Sun Devil Stadium; Tempe, AZ | ABC | W 48–42 | 63,985 | |
| October 30 | 7:00 pm | at No. 7 California | No. 20 | California Memorial Stadium; Berkeley, CA | TBS | L 0–27 | 52,652 | |
| November 6 | 4:30 pm | Stanford^{†} | No. 23 | Sun Devil Stadium; Tempe, AZ | FSN | W 34–31 | 59,002 | |
| November 13 | 5:00 pm | Washington State | No. 20 | Sun Devil Stadium; Tempe, AZ | TBS | W 45–28 | 60,319 | |
| November 26 | 1:00 pm | at Arizona | No. 18 | Arizona Stadium; Tucson, AZ (rivalry) | FSN | L 27–34 | 55,095 | |
| December 31 | 12:00 pm | vs. Purdue* | No. 21 | Sun Bowl; El Paso, TX (Sun Bowl) | CBS | W 27–23 | 51,288 | |
*Non-conference game; ^{†}Homecoming; Rankings from AP Poll released prior to the game; All times are in Mountain time

== Game summaries ==
=== Northwestern ===
| Team | 1 | 2 | 3 | 4 | Total |
|---|---|---|---|---|---|
| • Arizona State | 3 | 14 | 7 | 6 | 30 |
| Northwestern | 0 | 7 | 14 | 0 | 21 |

- Date: September 11
- Location: Ryan Field, Evanston, IL
- Game start: 9:00 a.m. MST
- Television network: ESPN2

Scoring summary
| 1 | 3:36 | ASU | Jesse Ainsworth 20-yard field goal | Arizona St 3–0 |
| 2 | 14:32 | NW | Noah Herron 9-yard run (Brian Huffman kick) | Northwestern 7–3 |
| 2 | 7:09 | ASU | Derek Hagan 47-yard pass from Andrew Walter (Jesse Ainsworth kick) | Arizona St 10–7 |
| 2 | 1:41 | ASU | Derek Hagan 41-yard pass from Andrew Walter (Jesse Ainsworth kick) | Arizona St 17–7 |
| 3 | 8:56 | ASU | Trent Richardson 30-yard pass from Andrew Walter (Jesse Ainsworth kick) | Arizona St 24–7 |
| 3 | 4:29 | NW | Terrell Jordan 25-yard run (Brian Huffman kick) | Arizona St 24–14 |
| 3 | 2:14 | NW | Brett Basanez 13-yard run (Brian Huffman kick) | Arizona St 24–21 |
| 4 | 13:35 | ASU | Jesse Ainsworth 41-yard field goal | Arizona St 27–21 |
| 4 | 1:19 | ASU | Jesse Ainsworth 18-yard field goal | Arizona St 30–21 |

=== Oregon ===
| Team | 1 | 2 | 3 | 4 | Total |
|---|---|---|---|---|---|
| • Arizona State | 0 | 14 | 7 | 7 | 28 |
| Oregon | 0 | 6 | 7 | 0 | 13 |

- Date: October 2
- Location: Autzen Stadium, Eugene, OR
- Game start: 7:15 p.m. MST

Scoring summary
| 2 | 12:38 | ORE | Jared Siegel 22-yard field goal | Oregon 3-0 |
| 2 | 10:35 | ASU | Jamaal Lewis 22-yard pass from Andrew Walter (Jesse Ainsworth kick) | Arizona St 7-3 |
| 2 | 5:25 | ORE | Jared Siegel 34-yard field goal | Arizona St 7-6 |
| 2 | 2:27 | ASU | Terry Richardson 24-yard pass from Andrew Walter (Jesse Ainsworth kick) | Arizona St 14-6 |
| 3 | 10:58 | ASU | Hakim Hill 1-yard run (Jesse Ainsworth kick) | Arizona St 21-6 |
| 3 | 2:13 | ORE | Terrence Whitehead 9-yard pass from Kellen Clemens (Jared Siegel kick) | Arizona St 21-13 |
| 4 | 3:07 | ASU | Rudy Burgess 1-yard pass from Andrew Walter (Jesse Ainsworth kick) | Arizona St 28-13 |
