= 2004 Oregon Ducks football team =

American college football season

2004 Oregon Ducks football
- Conference: Pacific-10 Conference
- Record: 5–6 (4–4 Pac-10)
- Head coach: Mike Bellotti (10th season)
- Offensive coordinator: Andy Ludwig (3rd season)
- Offensive scheme: Pro spread
- Defensive coordinator: Nick Aliotti (8th season)
- Base defense: 4–3
- Captain: Game captains
- Home stadium: Autzen Stadium

2004 Pacific-10 Conference football standings
	Conf.			Overall
Team	W		L	W		L
No. 1 USC † $	8	–	0	13	–	0
No. 9 California	7	–	1	10	–	2
No. 19 Arizona State	5	–	3	9	–	3
Oregon State	5	–	3	7	–	5
UCLA	4	–	4	6	–	6
Oregon	4	–	4	5	–	6
Washington State	3	–	5	5	–	6
Stanford	2	–	6	4	–	7
Arizona	2	–	6	3	–	8
Washington	0	–	8	1	–	10
$ – Conference champion; † – USC later vacated 2 wins (1 in conference), as well as the BCS and Pac-10 championships, due to NCAA sanctions.; Rankings from AP Poll

The 2004 Oregon Ducks football team represented the University of Oregon as a member of the Pacific-10 Conference (Pac-10) during the 2004 NCAA Division I-A football season. Led by tenth-year head coach Mike Bellotti, the Ducks compiled an overall record of 5–6 with a mark of 4–4 in conference play, tying for fifth place the Pac-10. The team played home games at Autzen Stadium in Eugene, Oregon.

== Schedule ==
Date	Time	Opponent	Rank	Site	TV	Result	Attendance
September 11	3:30 pm	Indiana*	No. 24	Autzen Stadium; Eugene, OR	OSN	L 24–30	57,550
September 18	12:30 pm	at No. 2 Oklahoma*		Gaylord Family Oklahoma Memorial Stadium; Norman, OK	ABC	L 7–31	84,280
September 25	12:30 pm	Idaho*		Autzen Stadium; Eugene, OR		W 48–10	57,912
October 2	7:15 pm	No. 21 Arizona State		Autzen Stadium; Eugene, OR	TBS	L 13–28	58,208
October 9	2:00 pm	at Washington State		Martin Stadium; Pullman, WA		W 41–38	35,117
October 16	12:30 pm	Arizona		Autzen Stadium; Eugene, OR		W 28–14	58,237
October 23	2:00 pm	at Stanford		Stanford Stadium; Stanford, CA (rivalry)		W 16–13	33,250
October 30	4:00 pm	Washington		Autzen Stadium; Eugene, OR (rivalry)	OSN	W 31–6	58,101
November 6	12:30 pm	at No. 4 California		California Memorial Stadium; Berkeley, CA	ABC	L 27–28	65,615
November 13	12:30 pm	UCLA		Autzen Stadium; Eugene, OR	ABC	L 26–34	58,344
November 20	4:00 pm	at Oregon State		Reser Stadium; Corvallis, OR (Civil War)	FSN	L 21–50	37,042
*Non-conference game; Rankings from AP Poll released prior to the game; All times are in Pacific time

== Before the season ==
=== Recruiting ===
College recruiting
Name	Hometown	School	Height	Weight	40^{‡}	Commit date
Cameron Colvin; WR	Concord, CA	De La Salle HS	6 ft 2 in (1.88 m)	193 lb (88 kg)	4.4	Feb 4, 2004
Cameron Colvin; WR	Recruit ratings: Scout: Rivals:					
David Faaeteete; DT	Medford, OR	North Medford HS	6 ft 3 in (1.91 m)	273 lb (124 kg)	4.8	May 12, 2003
David Faaeteete; DT	Recruit ratings: Scout: Rivals:					
Willie Glasper; CB	Concord, CA	De La Salle HS	5 ft 10 in (1.78 m)	180 lb (82 kg)	4.4	Jan 15, 2004
Willie Glasper; CB	Recruit ratings: Scout: Rivals:					
Terrance Kelly; LB	Concord, CA	De La Salle HS	6 ft 1 in (1.85 m)	215 lb (98 kg)	4.5	Jan 20, 2004
Terrance Kelly; LB	Recruit ratings: Scout: Rivals:					
Aaron Klovas; OL	Spanaway, WA	Bethel HS	6 ft 6 in (1.98 m)	300 lb (140 kg)	5.3	Jan 6, 2004
Aaron Klovas; OL	Recruit ratings: Scout: Rivals:					
Jackie Bates; CB	Concord, CA	De La Salle HS	5 ft 10 in (1.78 m)	185 lb (84 kg)	4.4	Dec 1, 2003
Jackie Bates; CB	Recruit ratings: Scout: Rivals:					
Jerome Boyd; S	Los Angeles, CA	Susan Miller Dorsey HS	6 ft 2 in (1.88 m)	188 lb (85 kg)	4.5	Jan 13, 2004
Jerome Boyd; S	Recruit ratings: Scout: Rivals:					
Jacob Hucko; S	Cerritos, CA	Cerritos HS	6 ft 8 in (2.03 m)	283 lb (128 kg)	5.0	Aug 7, 2003
Jacob Hucko; S	Recruit ratings: Scout: Rivals:					
Terrell Jackson; RB	Corona, CA	Centennial HS	5 ft 9 in (1.75 m)	190 lb (86 kg)	4.4	Jan 21, 2004
Terrell Jackson; RB	Recruit ratings: Scout: Rivals:					
Kwame Agyeman; S	Roselle, IL	Lake Park HS	6 ft 0 in (1.83 m)	195 lb (88 kg)	4.5	Jan 30, 2004
Kwame Agyeman; S	Recruit ratings: Scout: Rivals:					
Cole Linehan; DE	Banks, OR	Banks HS	6 ft 4 in (1.93 m)	265 lb (120 kg)	4.8	Jan 13, 2004
Cole Linehan; DE	Recruit ratings: Scout: Rivals:					
Ryan Phipps; LB	Corona, CA	Centennial HS	6 ft 0 in (1.83 m)	213 lb (97 kg)	4.4	Nov 10, 2003
Ryan Phipps; LB	Recruit ratings: Scout: Rivals:					
Geoff Schwartz; OL	Pacific Palisades, CA	Palisades Charter HS	6 ft 7 in (2.01 m)	304 lb (138 kg)	5.2	Dec 26, 2003
Geoff Schwartz; OL	Recruit ratings: Scout: Rivals:					
Jaison Williams; TE	Culver City, CA	Culver City Senior HS	6 ft 4 in (1.93 m)	215 lb (98 kg)	4.5	Nov 10, 2003
Jaison Williams; TE	Recruit ratings: Scout: Rivals:					
T.R. Smith; CB	Portland, OR	Jefferson HS	5 ft 11 in (1.80 m)	180 lb (82 kg)	4.4	Jan 30, 2004
T.R. Smith; CB	Recruit ratings: Scout: Rivals:					
John Bacon; LB	Lakewood, CO	Lakewood HS	6 ft 3 in (1.91 m)	229 lb (104 kg)	4.5	Dec 14, 2003
John Bacon; LB	Recruit ratings: Scout: Rivals:					
Ra'Shon Harris; DT	Pittsburg, CA	Pittsburg Senior HS	6 ft 5 in (1.96 m)	280 lb (130 kg)	4.9	Jan 30, 2004
Ra'Shon Harris; DT	Recruit ratings: Scout: Rivals:					
Ryan Keeling; TE	Springfield, OR	Thurston HS	6 ft 5 in (1.96 m)	225 lb (102 kg)	4.6	Nov 8, 2003
Ryan Keeling; TE	Recruit ratings: Scout: Rivals:					
Jeff Kendall; OL	Colorado Springs, CO	USAF Academy Prep	6 ft 4 in (1.93 m)	280 lb (130 kg)	4.9	Aug 12, 2003
Jeff Kendall; OL	Recruit ratings: Scout: Rivals:					
Thor Pili; DE	Orem, UT	Timpanogos HS	6 ft 4 in (1.93 m)	235 lb (107 kg)	4.8	Jan 28, 2004
Thor Pili; DE	Recruit ratings: Scout: Rivals:					
Max Unger; OL	Kamuela, HI	Hawaii Preparatory Academy	6 ft 5 in (1.96 m)	280 lb (130 kg)	5.1	Sep 1, 2003
Max Unger; OL	Recruit ratings: Scout: Rivals:					
Devlin Bayne; TE	Carlin, NV	Carlin HS	6 ft 7 in (2.01 m)	218 lb (99 kg)	4.6	Jan 16, 2004
Devlin Bayne; TE	Recruit ratings: Scout: Rivals:					
Patrick Chung; CB	Rancho Cucamonga, CA	Rancho Cucamonga HS	6 ft 0 in (1.83 m)	190 lb (86 kg)	4.4	Dec 16, 2003
Patrick Chung; CB	Recruit ratings: Scout: Rivals:					
Sharrod Davis; CB	Spring Valley, CA	Monte Vista HS	5 ft 10 in (1.78 m)	175 lb (79 kg)	4.6	Dec 24, 2003
Sharrod Davis; CB	Recruit ratings: Scout: Rivals:					
James Harris; WR	Roseville, CA	Oakmont HS	6 ft 1 in (1.85 m)	204 lb (93 kg)	4.5	Nov 12, 2003
James Harris; WR	Recruit ratings: Scout: Rivals:					
Micah Howeth; DE	Dallas, TX	W.T. White HS	6 ft 2 in (1.88 m)	245 lb (111 kg)	4.7	Feb 4, 2004
Micah Howeth; DE	Recruit ratings: Scout: Rivals:					
Mark Lewis; OL	Arroyo Grande, CA	Arroyo Grande HS	6 ft 5 in (1.96 m)	270 lb (120 kg)	5.0	Aug 21, 2003
Mark Lewis; OL	Recruit ratings: Scout: Rivals:					
Michael Speed; DE	Los Angeles, CA	University Senior HS	6 ft 5 in (1.96 m)	225 lb (102 kg)	NA	Feb 4, 2004
Michael Speed; DE	Recruit ratings: Scout: Rivals:					
Overall recruit ranking: Scout: 15 Rivals: 12
‡ Refers to 40-yard dash; Note: In many cases, Scout, Rivals, 247Sports, On3, and ESPN may conflict in their listings of height, weight and 40 time.; In these cases, the average was taken. ESPN grades are on a 100-point scale.; Sources: "Oregon Football Commitment List 2004". Rivals.; "Oregon College Football Recruiting Commits 2004". Scout.; "Scout.com Team Recruiting Rankings". Scout.; "2004 Team Ranking". Rivals.com.

== Game summaries ==
=== Indiana ===
Indiana at Oregon

Team	1	2	3	4	Total
• Indiana	17	6	7	0	30
Oregon	0	0	17	7	24

- Date: Saturday, September 11
- Location: Autzen Stadium, Eugene, Oregon
- Game start: 3:30 p.m. EST
- Source: ESPN

=== Oklahoma ===
Oregon at #2 Oklahoma

Team	1	2	3	4	Total
Oregon	0	0	7	0	7
• Oklahoma	0	10	14	7	31

- Date: Saturday, September 18
- Location: Oklahoma Memorial Stadium, Norman, Oklahoma
- Game start: 3:30 p.m. EST
- Source: ESPN

Scoring summary
2	14:56	OKLA	Trey DiCarlo 35-yard field goal	OKLA 3–0
2	6:03	OKLA	James Moses 4-yard pass from Jason White (Trey DiCarlo kick)	OKLA 10–0
3	7:47	OKLA	Donta Hickson 25-yard run (Trey DiCarlo kick)	OKLA 17–0
3	4:15	ORE	Dante Rosario 30-yard pass from Kellen Clemens (Jared Siegel kick)	OKLA 17–7
3	1:15	OKLA	Adrian Peterson 40-yard run (Trey DiCarlo kick)	OKLA 24–7
4	3:36	OKLA	Adrian Peterson 18-yard run (Trey DiCarlo kick)	OKLA 31–7

=== Idaho ===
Idaho at Oregon

Team	1	2	3	4	Total
Idaho	3	7	0	0	10
• Oregon	27	7	14	0	48

- Date: Saturday, September 25
- Location: Autzen Stadium, Eugene, Oregon
- Game start: 12:35 p.m. PST

Scoring summary
1	10:45	ORE	Dante Rosario 4-yard run (Jared Siegel kick)	ORE 7–0
1	8:27	ORE	Tim Day 12-yard pass from Kellen Clemens (Jared Siegel kick)	ORE 14–0
1	4:46	UI	Mike Barrow 41-yard field goal	ORE 14–3
1	1:46	ORE	Terrence Whitehead 1-yard run (Jared Siegel kick)	ORE 21–3
1	0:11	ORE	Chris Solomona 34-yard interception return (Jason Siegel kick failed)	ORE 27–3
2	5:05	ORE	Ken Washington 2-yard run (Paul Martinez kick)	ORE 34–3
2	1:03	UI	Jimmy Labita 16-yard pass from Michael Harrington (Mike Barrow kick)	ORE 34–10
3	9:11	ORE	Terrence Whitehead 5-yard pass from Kellen Clemens (Luke Bellotti kick)	ORE 41–10
3	7:44	ORE	Tim Day 2-yard pass from Kellen Clemens (Jared Siegel kick)	ORE 48–10

=== Washington State ===
Team	1	2	3	4	Total
• Oregon	7	7	0	27	41
Washington St	14	0	13	11	38

- Date: October 9
- Location: Martin Stadium, Pullman, WA
- Game start: 5:00 p.m. EST

Scoring summary
1	13:22	WSU	Jason Hill 39-yard pass from Josh Swogger (Loren Langley kick)	WSU 7–0
1	9:43	ORE	Kellen Clemens 1-yard run (Jared Siegel kick)	Tied 7–7
1	5:40	WSU	Jason Hill 25-yard pass from Josh Swogger (Loren Langley kick)	WSU 14–7
2	11:59	ORE	Kellen Clemens 3-yard run (Jared Siegel kick)	Tied 14–14
3	11:57	WSU	Jerome Harrison 1-yard run (Loren Langley kick)	WSU 21–14
3	3:37	WSU	Michael Bumpus 52-yard blocked punt return (kick blocked)	WSU 27–14
4	14:55	ORE	Tim Day 10-yard pass from Kellen Clemens (Jared Siegel kick)	WSU 27–21
4	11:54	WSU	Trandon Harvey 6-yard pass from Josh Swogger (Josh Swogger to Michael Bumpus pass)	WSU 35–21
4	9:38	ORE	Marcus Maxwell 11-yard pass from Kellen Clemens (Jared Siegel kick)	WSU 35–28
4	7:36	WSU	Loren Langley 34-yard field goal	WSU 38–28
4	5:00	ORE	Tim Day 14-yard pass from Kellen Clemens (pass failed)	WSU 38–34
4	1:21	ORE	Kellen Clemens 13-yard run (Jared Siegel kick)	ORE 41–38

=== Arizona ===
Team	1	2	3	4	Total
Arizona	0	0	0	14	14
• Oregon	7	7	7	7	28

- Date: October 16
- Location: Autzen Stadium, Eugene, Oregon
- Game start: 3:30 p.m. EST
- Source: ESPN

Scoring summary
1	9:45	ORE	Terrence Whitehead 1-yard run (Jared Siegel kick)	Oregon 7–0
2	6:12	ORE	Terrence Whitehead 1-yard run (Jared Siegel kick)	Oregon 14–0
3	12:10	ORE	Terrence Whitehead 8-yard run (Jared Siegel kick)	Oregon 21–0
4	5:06	ORE	Dante Rosario 5-yard pass from Kellen Clemens (Jared Siegel kick)	Oregon 28–0
4	2:00	ARIZ	Gilbert Harris 2-yard run (Nick Folk kick)	Oregon 28–7
4	1:16	ARIZ	Brad Wood 21-yard pass from Richard Kovalcheck (Nick Folk kick)	Oregon 28–14

== Roster ==
2004 Oregon Ducks football team roster
Players
Coaches
Offense

Pos.	#	Name	Class
WR	8	Keith Allen	Sr
FB	35	Robert Bolliger	Fr
TE	91	Eric Brosterhous	Fr
TB	28	Andiel Brown	Fr
QB	11	Kellen Clemens	Jr
WR	80	Cameron Colvin	Fr
G	66	Sean Cullen	Fr
TE	85	Tim Day	Jr
OT	77	Michael De La Grange	Sr
QB	10	Dennis Dixon	Fr
OT	68	Shawn Flanagan	So
C	70	Josh Hagemeyer	Jr
OT	78	Jacob Hucko	Fr
TB	21	Terrell Jackson	Fr
FB	41	Jerome Johnson	Fr
TE	82	Dan Kause	So
TE	81	Ryan Keeling	Fr
OL	51	Jeff Kendall	Fr
OL	58	Aaron Klovas	Fr
G	79	Robin Knebel	Sr
QB	19	Brady Leaf	Fr
OL	64	Mark Lewis	Fr
TE	88	Nate LiaBraaten	Jr
TE	48	Ryan Loftin	Sr
C	76	Enoka Lucas	So
FB	46	Matt Major	Sr
WR	83	Marcus Maxwell	Sr
WR	81	Brian Paysinger	Fr
OT	62	Jermaine Randolph	So
G	59	Ian Reynoso	Jr
FB	51	Dante Rosario	So
OL	75	Geoff Schwartz	Fr
TB	27	Ryan Shaw	Sr
WR	38	Tommy Smith	Sr
OT	72	Adam Snyder	Sr
G	74	Nickolas Steitz	Sr
WR	1	Garren Strong	Fr
OL	61	Josh Tschirgi	Fr
OL	60	Max Unger	Fr
TB	22	Chris Vincent	So
TB	20	Kenny Washington	Sr
WR	26	Kyle Weatherspoon	So
TE	86	Eddie Whitaker	Sr
TB	24	Terrence Whitehead	Jr
WR	6	Demetrius Williams	Jr
WR	4	Jaison Williams	Fr

Defense

Pos.	#	Name	Class
S	30	Kwame Agyeman	Fr
LB	37	Justin Andrews	Jr
LB	40	John Bacon	Fr
DT	98	Nuvraj Bassi	Jr
CB	43	Jackie Bates	Fr
DE	69	Devlin Bayne	Fr
CB	2	Marques Binns	Jr
S	13	Jerome Boyd	Fr
S	2	Jordan Carey	So
CB	21	Patrick Chung	Fr
CB	26	Sharrod Davis	Fr
S	38	Ryan DePalo	Fr
DT	90	David Faaeteete	Fr
CB	11	Charles Favroth	Sr
LB	78	Nick Federico	Jr
DT	56	Victor Filipe	Fr
CB	9	Ryan Gilliam	Fr
CB	17	Willie Glasper	Fr
LB	42	Brent Haberly	So
LB	33	Robert Hamilton	So
S	46	James Harris	Fr
DE	9	Ra'Shon Harris	Fr
CB	14	Sam Hughes	Sr
LB	66	Joe Isaac	Fr
LB	54	Reggie Kerney	So
DE	57	Jonathan Levine	So
DT	97	Cory Linehan	Fr
DE	92	Devan Long	Jr
LB	27	Steve Lynn	So
LB	52	Jerry Matson	Sr
S	29	Parris Moore	So
S	28	J.D. Nelson	So
DT	96	Haloti Ngata	So
DB	31	Justin Phinisee	Jr
LB	35	Ryan Phipps	Fr
DE	94	Thor Pili	Fr
LB	64	Jon Pope	So
LB	18	Ramone Reed	Sr
DE	95	Darius Sanders	So
DE	47	Chris Solomona	Sr
DB	3	Demetrius Spates	Jr
DE	87	Josh Thomas-Dotson	Fr
DE	45	Matt Toeaina	So
LB	84	Anthony Trucks	Jr
DB	23	Marley Tucker	Sr
S	34	A.J. Tuitele	Fr
DT	99	Robby Valenzuela	Sr
LB	10	Scott Vossmeyer	Sr
DB	15	Marc Walker	Jr
LB	50	Ramond White	Fr
CB	7	Rodney Woods	Jr

Special teams

Pos.	#	Name	Class
PK	40	Luke Bellotti	Fr
PK	93	Drew Larson	So
P	36	Paul Martinez	So
PK	25	Jared Siegel	Sr
LS	90	Eric Steimer	Fr

Head coach

- Mike Bellotti

Coordinators/assistant coaches

- Nick Aliotti
- Gary Campbell
- Dan Ferrigno
- Steve Greatwood
- Andy Ludwig
- John Neal
- Don Pellum
- Robin Ross
- Neal Zoumboukos

Legend

- (C) Team captain
- (S) Suspended
- (I) Ineligible
- Injured
- Redshirt

Roster
Last update: 2015-Dec-21
