= 2004 California Golden Bears football team =

American college football season

2004 California Golden Bears football

Holiday Bowl, L 31–45 vs. Texas Tech
- Conference: Pacific-10 Conference

Ranking
- Coaches: No. 9
- AP: No. 9
- Record: 10–2 (7–1 Pac-10)
- Head coach: Jeff Tedford (3rd season)
- Offensive coordinator: George Cortez (3rd season)
- Offensive scheme: Pro-style
- Defensive coordinator: Bob Gregory (3rd season)
- Base defense: 4–3
- Home stadium: California Memorial Stadium

2004 Pacific-10 Conference football standings
	Conf.			Overall
Team	W		L	W		L
No. 1 USC † $	8	–	0	13	–	0
No. 9 California	7	–	1	10	–	2
No. 19 Arizona State	5	–	3	9	–	3
Oregon State	5	–	3	7	–	5
UCLA	4	–	4	6	–	6
Oregon	4	–	4	5	–	6
Washington State	3	–	5	5	–	6
Stanford	2	–	6	4	–	7
Arizona	2	–	6	3	–	8
Washington	0	–	8	1	–	10
$ – Conference champion; † – USC later vacated 2 wins (1 in conference), as well as the BCS and Pac-10 championships, due to NCAA sanctions.; Rankings from AP Poll

The 2004 California Golden Bears football team was an American football team that represented the University of California, Berkeley in the Pacific-10 Conference (Pac-10) during the 2004 NCAA Division I-A football season. In their third year under head coach Jeff Tedford, the Golden Bears compiled a 10–2 record (7–1 against Pac-10 opponents), finished in second place in the Pac-10, and outscored their opponents by a combined score of 441 to 192.

The Golden Bears were ranked No. 4 at the end of the regular season, its only loss having been No. 1 USC by a 23–17 score. In that game, quarterback Aaron Rodgers set a school record for consecutive completed passes with 26 and tied an NCAA record with 23 consecutive passes completed in one game. He set a Cal single-game record for passing completion percentage of 85.3. Rodgers' performance set up the Golden Bears at first and goal with 1:47 remaining and a chance for the game-winning touchdown. On the first play of USC's goal-line stand, Rodgers threw an incomplete pass. This was followed by a second-down sack by Manuel Wright. After a timeout and Rodgers' incomplete pass on third down, USC stopped Cal's run play to win the game. Rodgers commented that it was "frustrating that we couldn't get the job done."

After Texas was picked over Cal for a Rose Bowl berth, the fourth-ranked Bears were awarded a spot in the Holiday Bowl, which they lost to Texas Tech, 45–31.

The team's statistical leaders included Aaron Rodgers with 2,566 passing yards, J. J. Arrington with 2,018 rushing yards, and Geoff McArthur with 862 receiving yards. Three California players received first-team honors on the 2004 College Football All-America Team: running back J. J. Arrington (AP, FWAA, TSN, SI, ESPN, CBS); offensive lineman Marvin Philip (SI); and defensive lineman Ryan Riddle (TSN, SI).

After the season, Rodgers decided to forgo his senior season to enter the 2005 NFL draft. He was drafted in the first round by the Green Bay Packers.

== Schedule ==
Date	Time	Opponent	Rank	Site	TV	Result	Attendance	Source
September 4	9:00 a.m.	at Air Force*	No. 13	Falcon Stadium; Colorado Springs, CO	ESPN2	W 56–14	50,075	
September 11	3:30 p.m.	New Mexico State*	No. 12	California Memorial Stadium; Berkeley, CA	KRON	W 41–14	58,949	
October 2	1:00 p.m.	at Oregon State	No. 10	Reser Stadium; Corvallis, OR	FSN	W 49–7	36,003	
October 9	12:30 p.m.	at No. 1 USC	No. 7	Los Angeles Memorial Coliseum; Los Angeles, CA (College GameDay)	ABC	L 17–23	90,008	
October 16	4:00 p.m.	UCLA^{†}	No. 8	California Memorial Stadium; Berkeley, CA (rivalry)	TBS	W 45–28	69,898	
October 23	4:00 p.m.	at Arizona	No. 7	Arizona Stadium; Tucson, AZ		W 38–0	52,049	
October 30	7:00 p.m.	No. 20 Arizona State	No. 7	California Memorial Stadium; Berkeley, CA	TBS	W 27–0	52,652	
November 6	12:30 p.m.	Oregon	No. 4	California Memorial Stadium; Berkeley, CA	ABC	W 28–27	65,615	
November 13	12:30 p.m.	at Washington	No. 5	Husky Stadium; Seattle, WA		W 42–12	63,451	
November 20	12:30 p.m.	Stanford	No. 4	California Memorial Stadium; Berkeley, CA (Big Game)	FSN	W 41–6	72,981	
December 4	4:30 p.m.	at Southern Miss*	No. 4	M. M. Roberts Stadium; Hattiesburg, MS	ESPN	W 26–16	27,480	
December 30	5:00 p.m.	vs. No. 20 Texas Tech*	No. 4	Qualcomm Stadium; San Diego, CA (Holiday Bowl)	ESPN	L 31–45	63,711	
*Non-conference game; ^{†}Homecoming; Rankings from AP Poll released prior to the game; All times are in Pacific time

== Game summaries ==
=== At Air Force ===
	1	2	3	4	Total
No. 12 Golden Bears	14	7	14	21	56
Falcons	7	7	0	0	14

=== New Mexico State ===
	1	2	3	4	Total
Aggies	0	7	0	7	14
No. 12 Golden Bears	6	21	7	7	41

=== At Oregon State ===
	1	2	3	4	Total
No. 10 Golden Bears	21	7	7	14	49
Beavers	7	0	0	0	7

=== At No. 1 USC ===
	1	2	3	4	Total
No. 7 Golden Bears	0	10	7	0	17
No. 1 Trojans	10	6	7	0	23

=== UCLA ===
	1	2	3	4	Total
Bruins	0	14	0	14	28
No. 8 Golden Bears	7	14	7	17	45

=== At Arizona ===
	1	2	3	4	Total
No. 7 Golden Bears	7	21	0	10	38
Wildcats	0	0	0	0	0

=== No. 20 Arizona State ===
	1	2	3	4	Total
No. 20 Sun Devils	0	0	0	0	0
No. 7 Golden Bears	10	3	7	7	27

=== Oregon ===
	1	2	3	4	Total
Ducks	20	7	0	0	27
No. 4 Golden Bears	14	7	0	7	28

=== At Washington ===
	1	2	3	4	Total
No. 5 Golden Bears	0	7	21	14	42
Huskies	3	3	6	0	12

=== Stanford ===
Team	1	2	3	4	Total
Cardinal	3	0	3	0	6
• No. 4 Golden Bears	10	0	10	21	41

- Date: November 20
- Location: California Memorial Stadium, Berkeley, CA
- Game start: 3:30 p.m. EST

Scoring summary
1	8:45	CAL	Robert Jordan 29 yard pass from Aaron Rodgers (Tom Schneider kick)	CAL 7-0
1	2:34	CAL	Tom Schneider 42 yard field goal	CAL 10-0
1	0:20	STAN	Mike Sgroi 21 yard field goal	CAL 10-3
3	8:38	CAL	Tom Schneider 28 yard field goal	CAL 13-3
3	3:22	CAL	Marshawn Lynch 55 yard run (Tom Schneider kick)	CAL 20-3
3	1:18	STAN	Mike Sgroi 44 yard field goal	CAL 20-6
4	12:53	CAL	J.J. Arrington 9 yard run (Tom Schneider kick)	CAL 27-6
4	9:26	CAL	Burl Toler 20 yard pass from Marshawn Lynch (Tom Schneider kick)	CAL 34-6
4	3:05	CAL	Reggie Robertson 5 yard run (Tom Schneider kick)	CAL 41-6

=== At Southern Miss ===
	1	2	3	4	Total
No. 4 Golden Bears	0	14	3	9	26
Golden Eagles	7	0	3	6	16

=== Vs. No. 20 Texas Tech (2004 Holiday Bowl) ===
	1	2	3	4	Total
No. 20 Red Raiders	7	17	14	7	45
No. 4 Golden Bears	14	0	3	14	31

== Roster ==
2004 California Golden Bears football team roster
Players
Coaches
Offense

Pos.	#	Name	Class
WR	1	Noah Smith	Fr
RB	2	Marcus O'Keith	So
QB	3	Steve Levy	So
WR	4	David Gray	So
QB	8	Aaron Rodgers	Jr
RB	24	Marshawn Lynch	Fr
RB	28	Justin Forsett	Fr
RB	30	J. J. Arrington	Sr
OL	61	Ryan O'Callaghan	Jr
WR	80	Sean Young	Fr
WR	81	Joe Crenshaw	Sr
TE	82	Craig Stevens	Fr
WR	85	LaReylle Cunningham	Fr
WR	86	Sam DeSa	Fr
TE	87	John Rust	Jr
TE	88	Garrett Cross	Sr

Defense

Pos.	#	Name	Class
LB	1	Worrell Williams	Fr
DB	2	Bernard Hicks	Fr
S	20	Matt Giordano	Sr
DE	90	Ryan Riddle	Sr
DL	91	John Bordalampe	Fr
DE	92	Ray Tago	Sr
DT	93	John Allen	Fr
DE	94	Tosh Lupoi	Sr
DT	95	Albert Ma'afala	So
DE	96	Kyle McClure	Fr
DE	97	Brian Harrison	Jr
DE	98	Randall Perkins	Sr

Special teams

Pos.	#	Name	Class
PK	5	Anthony Binswanger	Fr
LS	99	L. P. Ladouceur	Sr

Head coach

- Jeff Tedford

Coordinators/assistant coaches

- George Cortez (offensive coordinator/quarterbacks)
- Bob Gregory (defensive coordinator/outside linebackers)
- Pete Alamar (special teams/tight ends)
- Ken Delgado (defensive line)
- Ron Gould (running backs)
- Eric Kiesau (wide receivers)
- Jim Michalczik (assistant head coach/offensive line)
- Justin Wilcox (linebackers)
- J. D. Williams (secondary)
- Mike McHugh (director of football operations)
- Bert Watts (graduate assistant - defense)
- Kevin Daft (graduate assistant - offense)
- Jim Sterbick (offensive assistant)

Legend

- (C) Team captain
- (S) Suspended
- (I) Ineligible
- Injured
- Redshirt

Roster
Last update: January 18, 2017

== See also ==
- BCS controversies, which includes Texas receiving the Rose Bowl bid over Cal
