= Kenny James (American football) =

American football player (born 1984)

Profile
- Position: Running back

Personal information
- Born: April 14, 1984 (age 42)
- Listed height: 5 ft 10 in (1.78 m)
- Listed weight: 215 lb (98 kg)

Career information
- High school: Dos Palos (CA)
- College: Washington
- NFL draft: 2007: undrafted

Career history
- Seattle Seahawks (2007)*
- * Offseason or practice squad member only

Awards and highlights
- Washington Offensive MVP (2004)

Kenny James (born April 14, 1984) is a former American football running back. He was signed by the Seattle Seahawks as an undrafted free agent in 2007. He played college football at Washington.

== College career ==
James graduated in June 2006 with a degree in American ethnic studies.

== NFL Combine ==
At the 2007 NFL Combine, Kenny measured in at 5'9" and 217 pounds. His 40 time was 4.62 seconds.
