= 2004 Oregon State Beavers football team =

American college football season

2004 Oregon State Beavers football

Insight Bowl champion

Insight Bowl, W 38–21 vs. Notre Dame
- Conference: Pacific-10 Conference
- Record: 7–5 (5–3 Pac-10)
- Head coach: Mike Riley (4th season)
- Offensive coordinator: Paul Chryst (4th season)
- Offensive scheme: Pro-style
- Defensive coordinator: Mark Banker (2nd season)
- Base defense: 4–3
- Home stadium: Reser Stadium

2004 Pacific-10 Conference football standings
	Conf.			Overall
Team	W		L	W		L
No. 1 USC † $	8	–	0	13	–	0
No. 9 California	7	–	1	10	–	2
No. 19 Arizona State	5	–	3	9	–	3
Oregon State	5	–	3	7	–	5
UCLA	4	–	4	6	–	6
Oregon	4	–	4	5	–	6
Washington State	3	–	5	5	–	6
Stanford	2	–	6	4	–	7
Arizona	2	–	6	3	–	8
Washington	0	–	8	1	–	10
$ – Conference champion; † – USC later vacated 2 wins (1 in conference), as well as the BCS and Pac-10 championships, due to NCAA sanctions.; Rankings from AP Poll

The 2004 Oregon State Beavers football team represented Oregon State University as a member of the Pacific-10 Conference (Pac-10) during the 2004 NCAA Division I-A football season. Led by fourth-year head coach Mike Riley, the Beavers compiled an overall record of 7–5 with a mark of 5–3 in conference play, tying for third place the Pac-10. Oregon State was invited to the Insight Bowl, where the Beavers defeated Notre Dame. The team played home games at Reser Stadium in Corvallis, Oregon.

== Schedule ==
Date	Time	Opponent	Site	TV	Result	Attendance
September 4	3:00 pm	at No. 3 LSU*	Tiger Stadium; Baton Rouge, LA (College GameDay)	ESPN	L 21–22 ^{OT}	91,828
September 10	7:00 pm	at Boise State*	Bronco Stadium; Boise, ID	ESPN	L 34–55	30,950
September 18	1:00 pm	New Mexico*	Reser Stadium; Corvallis, OR		W 17–7	35,950
September 25	7:15 pm	at No. 22 Arizona State	Sun Devil Stadium; Tempe, AZ	FSNNW	L 14–27	63,312
October 2	1:00 pm	No. 10 California	Reser Stadium; Corvallis, OR	FSN	L 7–49	36,003
October 16	12:30 pm	at Washington	Husky Stadium; Seattle, WA		W 29–14	65,351
October 23	1:00 pm	Washington State	Reser Stadium; Corvallis, OR		W 38–19	36,265
October 30	4:00 pm	at Arizona	Arizona Stadium; Tucson, AZ	FSNNW	W 28–14	47,245
November 6	7:00 pm	No. 1 USC	Reser Stadium; Corvallis, OR	FSN	L 20–28	36,412
November 13	2:00 pm	at Stanford	Stanford Stadium; Stanford, CA		W 24–19	27,850
November 20	4:00 pm	Oregon	Reser Stadium; Corvallis, OR (Civil War)	FSN	W 50–21	37,042
December 28	6:30 pm	vs. Notre Dame*	Bank One Ballpark; Phoenix, AZ (Insight Bowl)	ESPN	W 38–21	45,917
*Non-conference game; Rankings from AP Poll released prior to the game; All times are in Pacific time

== Game summaries ==
=== LSU ===
Oregon State at #4 LSU

Team	1	2	3	4	OT	Total
Beavers	6	3	6	0	6	21
• Tigers	0	0	7	8	7	22

- Date: September 4
- Location: Tiger Stadium
- Game start: 5:00 p.m. CST
- Elapsed time: 3:44
- Game attendance: 91,828
- Game weather: Overcast; 89 °F (32 °C); wind 8 mph (13 km/h) NE
- Referee: Jay Vines
- Television network: ESPN

Scoring summary
Q1	12:08	ORST	Gillett 6 yard pass from Anderson (kick failed)	ORST 6–0
Q2	1:35	ORST	Serna 40 yard field goal	ORST 9–0
Q3	5:41	LSU	Green 16 yard pass from Russell (Jackson kick)	ORST 9–7
Q3	0:48	ORST	Wheat-Brown 4 yard pass from Anderson (kick failed)	ORST 15–7
Q4	1:05	LSU	Bowe 38 yard pass from Randall (Russell run)	Tie 15–15
OT		LSU	Randall 5 yard run (Jackson kick)	LSU 22–15
OT		ORST	Newton 19 yard pass from Anderson (kick failed)	LSU 22–21

=== Insight Bowl ===
Notre Dame vs. Oregon State

Team	1	2	3	4	Total
Fighting Irish	0	7	7	7	21
• Beavers	14	7	3	14	38

- Date: December 28
- Location: Bank One Ballpark
- Game start: 6:45 p.m. PST
- Game attendance: 45,917
- Television network: ESPN

Scoring summary
1	9:24	ORST	George Gillett 12 yard pass from Derek Anderson (Alexis Serna kick)	Oregon State 7–0
1	5:41	ORST	Joe Newton 11 yard pass from Derek Anderson (Alexis Serna kick)	Oregon State 14–0
2	7:49	ORST	Dan Haines 11 yard pass from Derek Anderson (Alexis Serna kick)	Oregon State 21–0
2	:56	ND	Anthony Fasano 13 yard pass from Brady Quinn (D.J. Fitzpatrick kick)	Oregon State 21–7
3	9:16	ORST	Alexis Serna 38 yard field goal	Oregon State 24–7
3	2:40	ND	Darius Walker 5 yard run (D.J. Fitzpatrick kick)	Oregon State 24–14
4	12:17	ORST	Joe Newton 1 yard pass from Derek Anderson (Alexis Serna kick)	Oregon State 31–14
4	4:52	ND	Rhema McKnight 18 yard pass from Brady Quinn (D.J. Fitzpatrick kick)	Oregon State 31–21
4	3:19	ORST	Dwight Wright Jr. 2 yard run (Alexis Serna kick)	Oregon State 38–21

== Roster ==
- QB Derek Anderson, Sr.
- CB Aric Williams, RS-Sr.
