= Kellen Clemens =

American football player (born 1983)

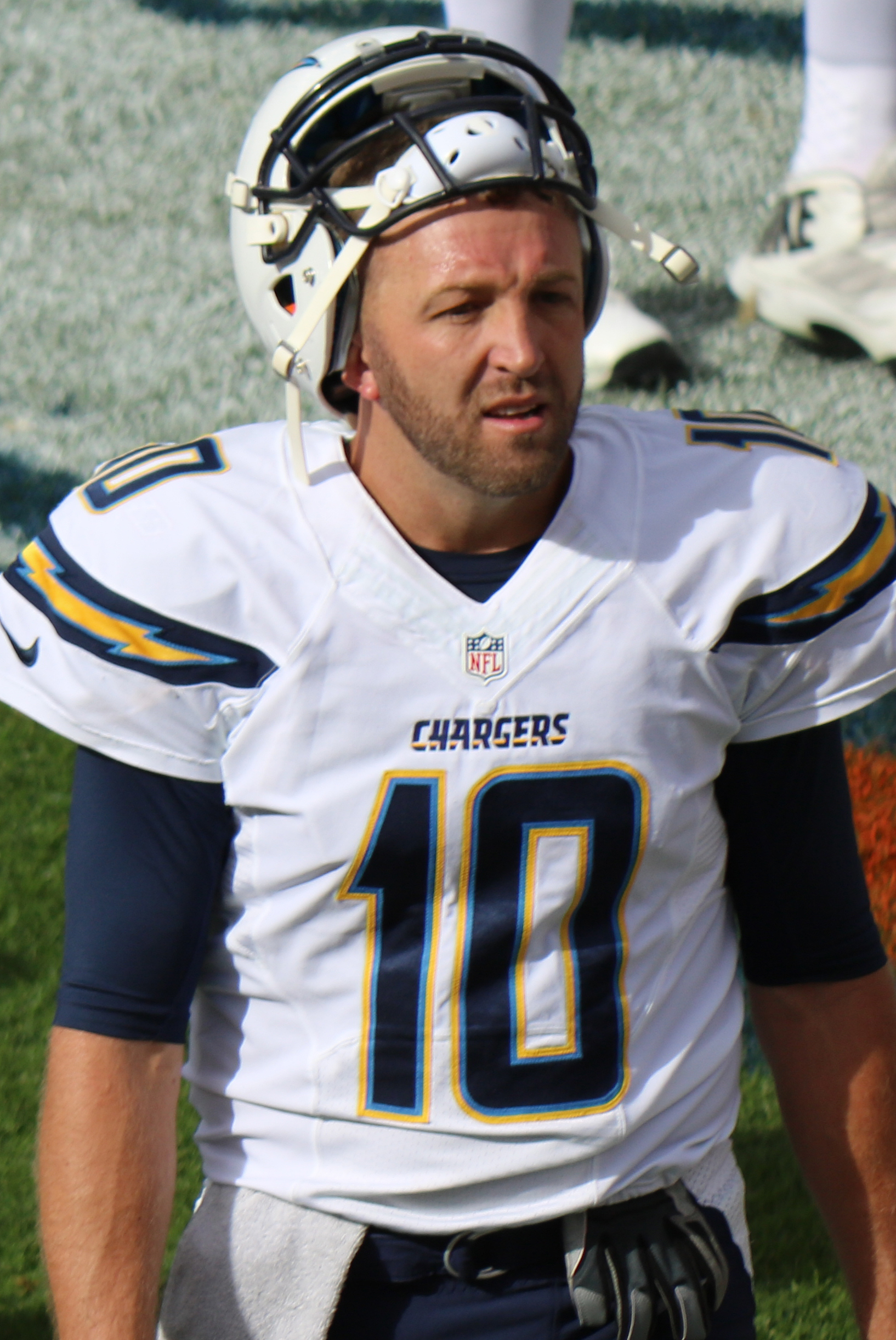
- Clemens with the San Diego Chargers in 2016

No. 6, 11, 1, 10
- Position: Quarterback

Personal information
- Born: June 7, 1983 (age 43); Burns, Oregon, U.S.
- Listed height: 6 ft 2 in (1.88 m)
- Listed weight: 220 lb (100 kg)

Career information
- High school: Burns
- College: Oregon (2001–2005)
- NFL draft: 2006: 2nd round, 49th overall pick

Career history
- New York Jets (2006–2010); Washington Redskins (2011)*; Houston Texans (2011); St. Louis Rams (2011–2013); San Diego / Los Angeles Chargers (2014–2017)
- * Offseason or practice squad member only

Career NFL statistics
- Passing attempts: 638
- Passing completions: 350
- Completion percentage: 54.9%
- TD–INT: 16–21
- Passing yards: 4,053
- Passer rating: 68.9
- Stats at Pro Football Reference

Kellen Vincent Clemens (born June 7, 1983) is an American former professional football player who was a quarterback for 11 seasons in the National Football League (NFL). He played college football for the Oregon Ducks and was selected by the New York Jets in the second round of the 2006 NFL draft. He was also been a member of the Washington Redskins, Houston Texans, St. Louis Rams, and San Diego / Los Angeles Chargers.

== Early life ==
Born and raised in Burns in eastern Oregon, Clemens played high school football for the Burns Hilanders and led them to the Oregon state 3A championship game in 1999. In his high school career, he threw for a state-record 8,646 yards (610-of-1,112) and 102 touchdowns. He also received USA Today All-American honors and Oregon Gatorade Player of the Year while in high school, where he completed 218 of 395 passes for 3,464 yards (3,167 m) and 37 touchdowns with 325 rushing yards and 15 touchdowns in his senior season. He was coached by Terry Graham using the run and shoot offense.

== College career ==
Clemens played college football at the University of Oregon in Eugene. He played for head coach Mike Bellotti while at Oregon. He assumed the role of starting quarterback in all 13 games in 2003 and responded by throwing for more touchdown passes and yards than any sophomore in school history, surpassing Dan Fouts—who had 16 touchdowns and 2,390 yards, in 1970. Clemens posted three rushing touchdowns, three passing touchdowns and a career-best 437 passing yards in a road victory over Washington State as a junior. As a senior in 2005, he broke his ankle while playing against Arizona. Despite missing remaining three games of the season, Clemens finished 2005 with 2,406 passing yards, 19 touchdowns, four interceptions, and a 152.87 passer efficiency rating. He finished his Oregon career with 7,555 passing yards, which ranked third in school history at the time before being passed up by Marcus Mariota in the 2014 season.

== Professional career ==
Pre-draft measurables
Height	Weight	Arm length	Hand span
6 ft 1 5/8 in (1.87 m)	224 lb (102 kg)	30 1/2 in (0.77 m)	9 3/8 in (0.24 m)
All values from NFL Combine

=== New York Jets ===
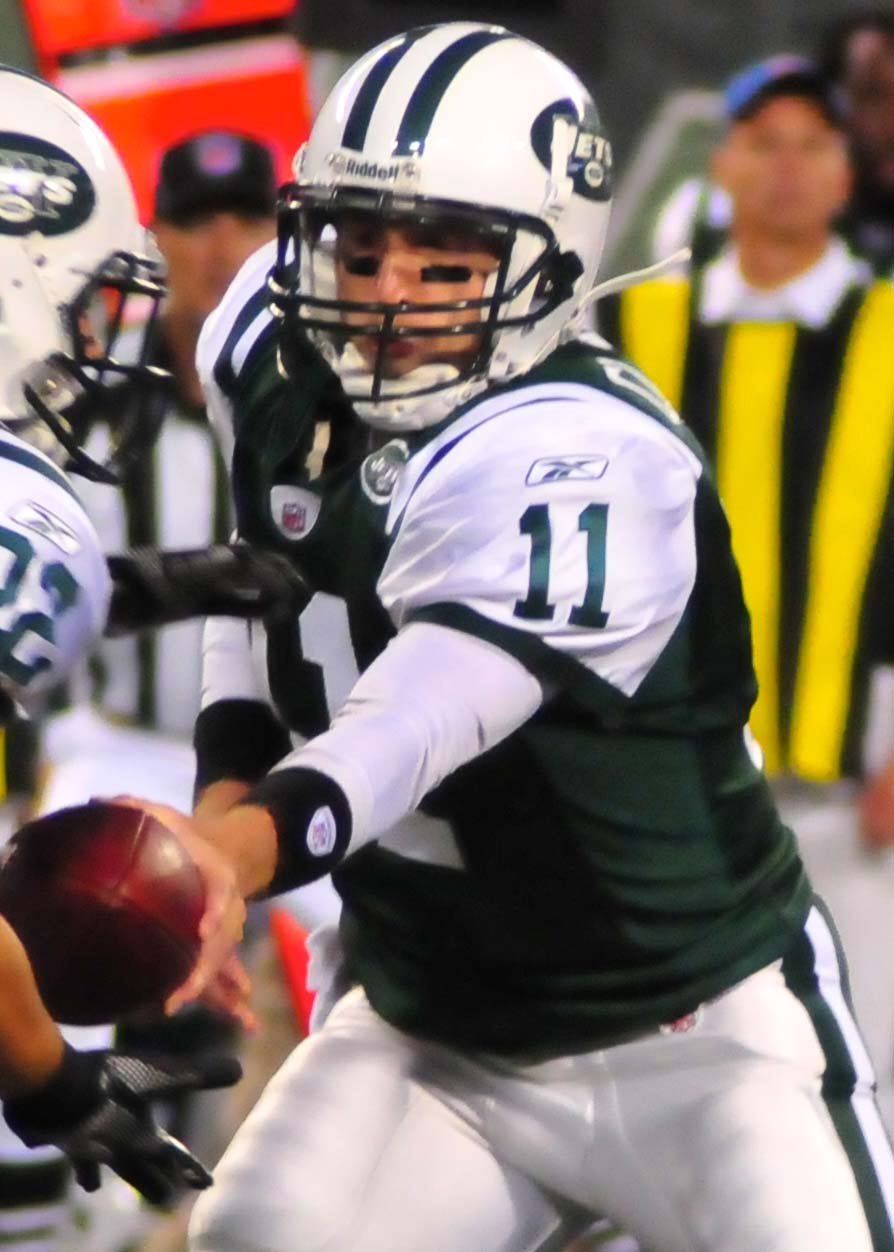
Clemens with the Jets during the 2009 preseason.

Clemens was selected by the New York Jets in the second round of the 2006 NFL draft, the 49th overall pick, to serve as the secondary quarterback to Chad Pennington. A healthy Pennington resulted in little playing time for Clemens in 2006. He made his NFL debut in relief appearance against the Jacksonville Jaguars, recording his first career pass attempt and rushing once for two yards in the 41–0 loss. He entered in a Week 14 31–13 loss to the Buffalo Bills, rushed once for eight yards but did not attempt a pass. He recorded only two attempts and 0 completions in his rookie season.

Due to an injury to Pennington in the Jets's 2007 season opener against the New England Patriots, Clemens recorded his first completed pass in the NFL with a final record for the day of five complete passes on ten attempts in the 38–14 loss. Clemens made his first career start in Week 2 of the 2007 season. His effectiveness was minimized by the Ravens's defense for the first three quarters, with the Jets trailing 20–3 at one point. However, in the fourth quarter, Clemens led the Jets on a scoring drive that cut Baltimore's lead to 20–13. On the last drive, he attempted what would have been a game-tying touchdown pass to Jets wide receiver Justin McCareins, but the pass was dropped by McCareins and intercepted by the Ravens' Ray Lewis.

His next appearance came in week 8 against the Buffalo Bills. A struggling Pennington was pulled by head coach Eric Mangini in the middle of the fourth quarter and replaced by Clemens. Clemens led two drives against the Buffalo defense. Down 13–3 and pressed for time, Clemens attempted to quickly move the Jets offense down the field but was intercepted twice. The following day, on October 29, 2007, Clemens was named the starting quarterback for the next game against the Washington Redskins. In the 23–20 loss, he had 226 passing yards and a passing touchdown. He finished the 2007 season with 1,529 passing yards, five passing touchdowns, and ten interceptions in 11 games.

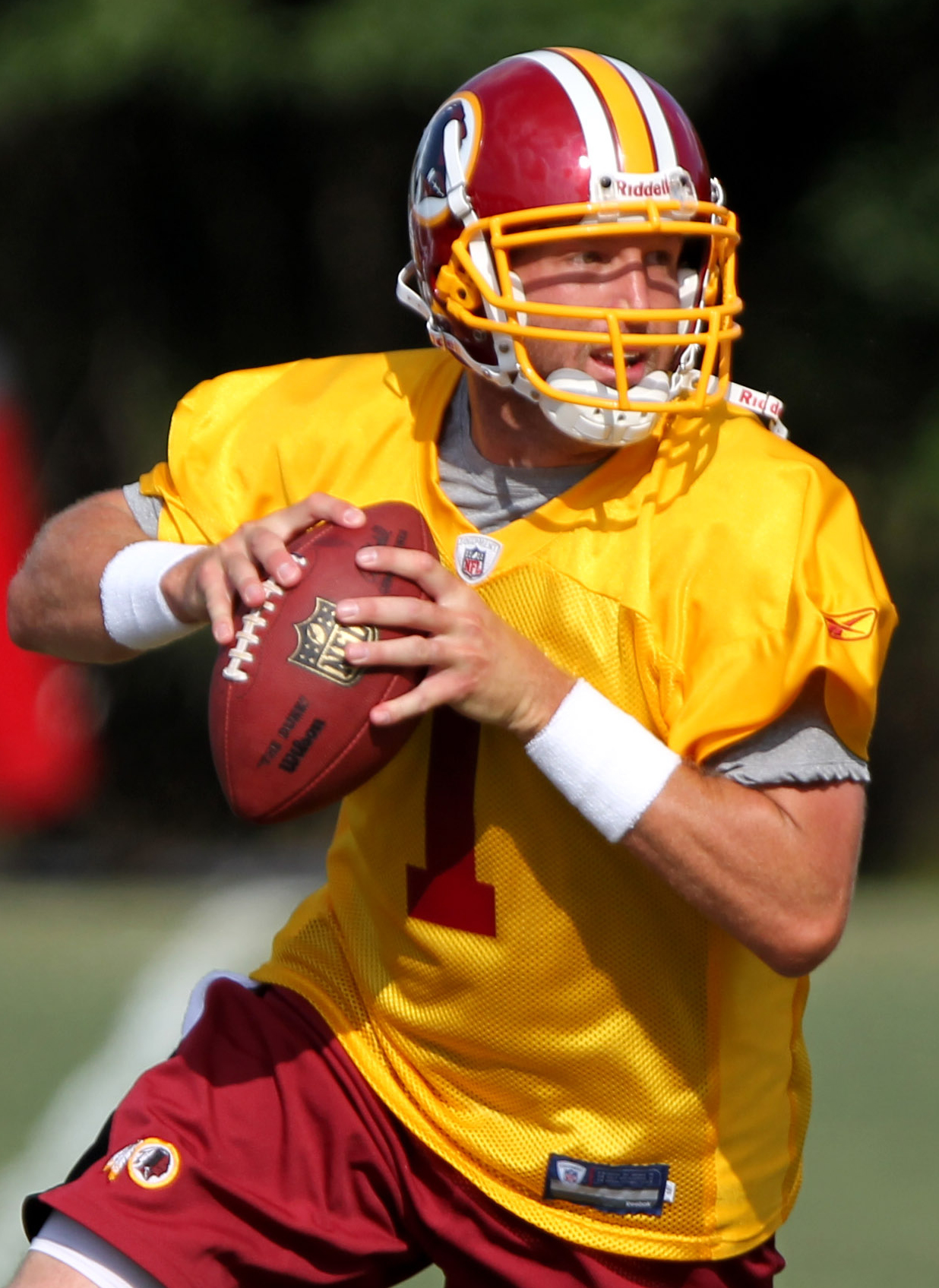
Clemens with the Redskins

In 2008, Clemens was only on the field in two games to attempt five passes as the backup to Brett Favre. When Mike Nugent, the Jets's kicker, injured his thigh in the September 7 game against the Miami Dolphins, Clemens filled in as the team's placekicker, but was not called upon to kick.

On August 26, 2009, Jet's head coach Rex Ryan announced that Mark Sanchez would be the starting quarterback for the 2009 season, a position left vacant after Brett Favre was released from the Jets in February. On December 3, Clemens was forced to come in against the Buffalo Bills after Mark Sanchez sprained his PCL. Clemens started the Jets's next game against the 1–11 Tampa Bay Buccaneers. Despite an unexceptional personal performance by Clemens, the Jets were still able to pick up an important 26–3 victory.

Clemens threw for 125 yards with no touchdowns in 2009 and played mostly when Mark Sanchez was injured. He was re-signed to a one-year contract for the 2010 season on April 13, but the only action he saw was in the Week 17 game against the Buffalo Bills.

=== Washington Redskins ===
On July 27, 2011, Clemens signed a one-year contract with the Washington Redskins where he competed for a backup role during the 2011 preseason. He was released by the team on September 3.

=== Houston Texans ===
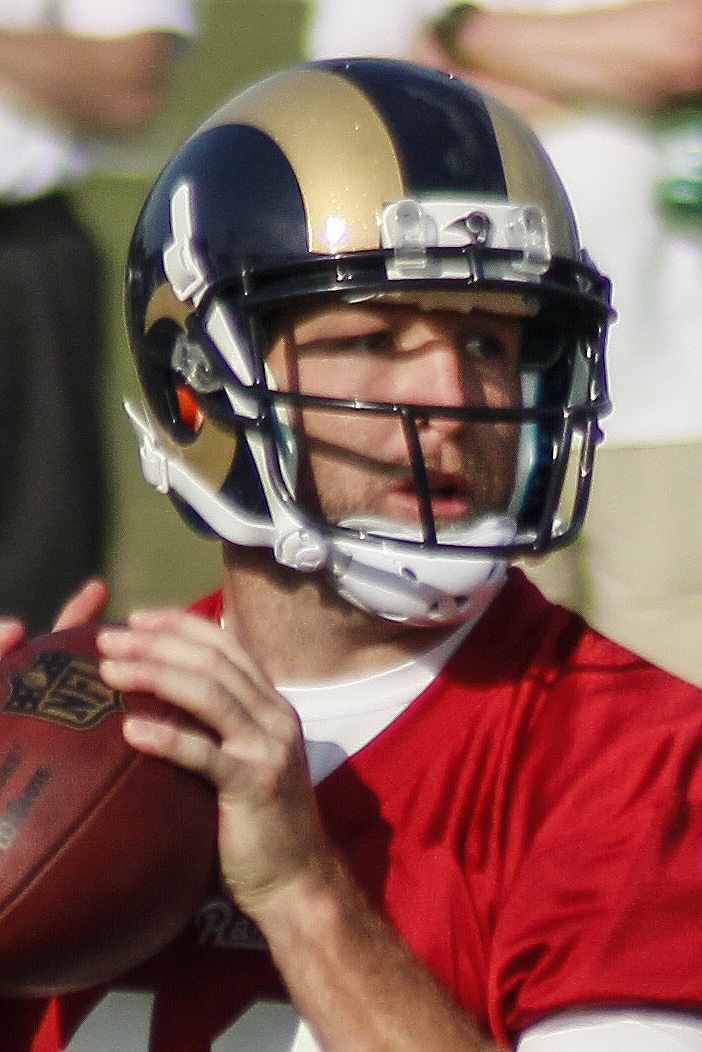
Clemens with the Rams during the 2013 preseason

Clemens was signed by the Houston Texans on November 23, 2011, after starting quarterback Matt Schaub was placed on injured reserve. Two weeks later, he was waived in order for the Texans to sign Jeff Garcia.

=== St. Louis Rams ===
The St. Louis Rams claimed Clemens off of waivers from Houston on December 7, 2011.

After an ankle sprain sidelined starting quarterback Sam Bradford and with backup A. J. Feeley out with a thumb injury, Clemens started on December 18 against the Cincinnati Bengals. With only 11 days to get familiar with the team and the offense, Clemens passed for 229 yards completing 25-of-36 passes. In that game, he completed a 25-yard touchdown pass to wide receiver Danario Alexander, his first NFL touchdown pass since Week 17 of the 2007 season with the Jets, but the Bengals won by a score of 20–13. Clemens started the final two games for the Rams, both losses to the Steelers and rival San Francisco 49ers. He finished the 2011 season with two touchdown passes and one rushing touchdown, and was re-signed by the Rams.

In the 2012 season, Clemens only saw action in two games against the New England Patriots and Arizona Cardinals. He completed one pass for 39 yards and had two rushes for five yards.

After Bradford went down with a season-ending injury in Week 7 in 2013, Clemens started the final nine games, going 4–5 as the Rams' starter and finished with 1,673 yards, eight touchdowns, and seven interceptions.

=== San Diego / Los Angeles Chargers ===
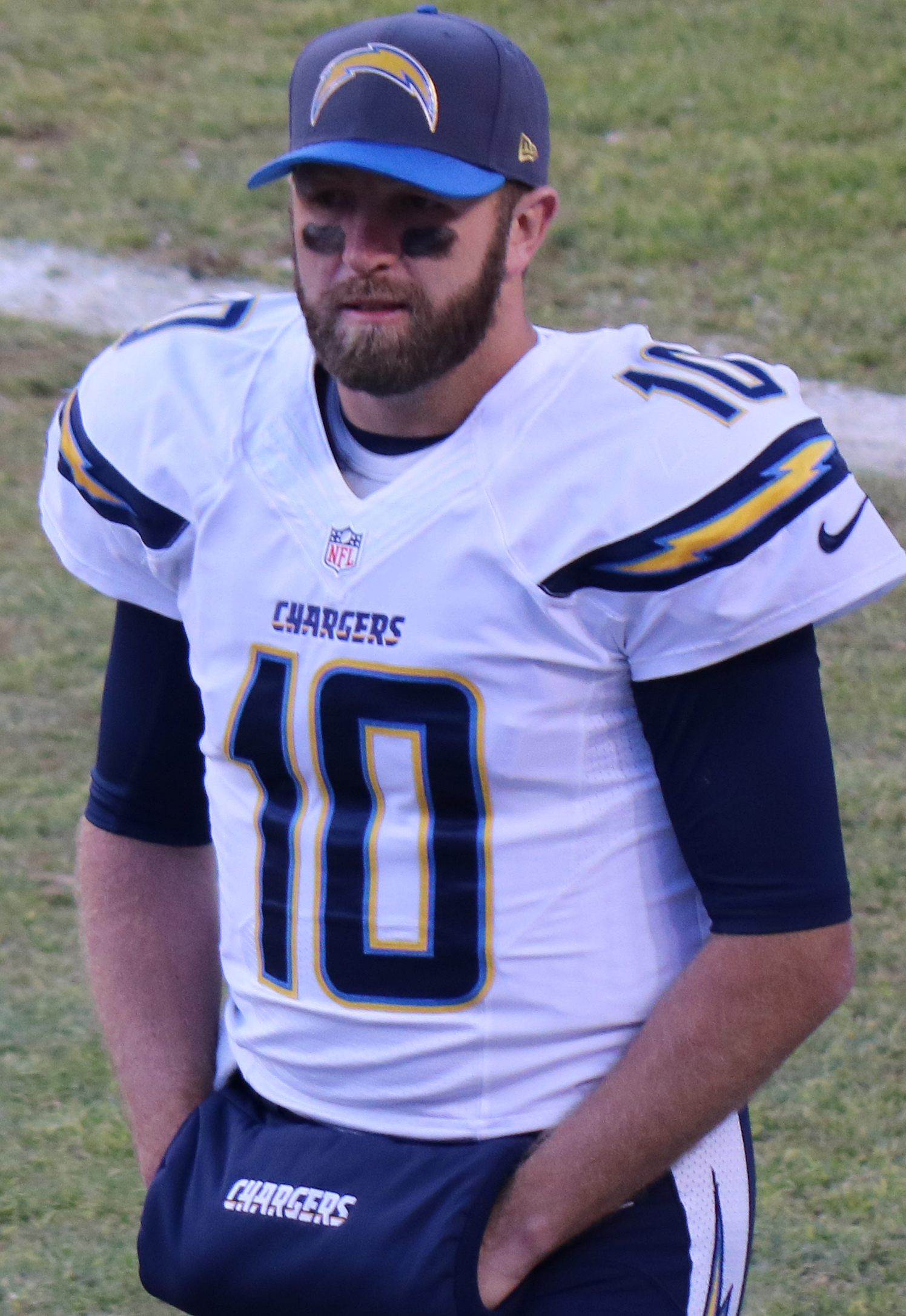
Clemens with the Chargers in 2016

Clemens signed a two-year contract with the San Diego Chargers on March 13, 2014. In the 2014 season, he only appeared in two games and completed one pass for 10 yards. Clemens threw his first touchdown as a Charger on September 27, 2015, a 19-yard pass to Keenan Allen against the Minnesota Vikings.

In the 2016 season, Clemens appeared in one game, a 38–14 victory over the Jacksonville Jaguars, in relief of Philip Rivers at quarterback. In addition, he saw some playing time on special teams throughout the season.

Clemens was re-signed to a one-year contract on March 9, 2017. On September 2, he was released by the Chargers, but was re-signed two days later. In the 2017 season, Clemens remained in a relief role and completed six passes for 75 yards and an interception.

== Career statistics ==
=== NFL ===
Year	Team	Games		Passing								Rushing			
Year	Team	GP	GS	Cmp	Att	Pct	Yds	Avg	TD	Int	Rtg	Att	Yds	Avg	TD
2006	NYJ	2	0	0	1	0.0	0	0.0	0	0	39.6	2	10	5.0	0
2007	NYJ	10	8	130	250	52.0	1,529	6.1	5	10	60.9	27	111	4.1	1
2008	NYJ	2	0	3	5	60.0	26	5.2	0	1	34.2	3	−3	−1.0	0
2009	NYJ	10	1	13	26	50.0	125	4.8	0	0	63.8	12	1	0.1	0
2010	NYJ	1	0	1	2	50.0	6	3.0	0	0	56.2	2	9	4.5	1
2011	STL	3	3	48	91	52.7	546	6.0	2	1	73.8	6	37	6.2	1
2012	STL	2	0	1	3	33.3	39	13.0	0	1	42.4	2	5	2.5	0
2013	STL	10	9	142	242	58.7	1,673	6.9	8	7	78.8	23	64	2.8	0
2014	SD	2	0	1	3	33.3	10	3.3	0	0	43.8	0	0	0.0	0
2015	SD	2	0	5	6	83.3	63	10.5	1	0	150.0	1	−1	−1.0	0
2016	SD	12	0	0	1	0.0	0	0.0	0	0	39.6	2	−1	−0.5	0
2017	LAC	8	0	6	8	75.0	36	4.5	0	1	43.8	5	−5	−1.0	0
Career		64	21	350	638	54.9	4,053	6.4	16	21	68.9	85	227	2.7	3

=== College ===
Season	Team	Passing								Rushing			
Season	Team	Cmp	Att	Pct	Yds	Y/A	TD	Int	Rtg	Att	Yds	Avg	TD
2002	Oregon	23	40	57.5	201	5.0	2	1	111.2	8	9	1.1	0
2003	Oregon	182	304	59.9	2,400	7.9	18	9	139.8	78	108	1.4	2
2004	Oregon	223	372	59.9	2,548	6.8	22	10	131.6	118	190	1.6	4
2005	Oregon	185	289	64.0	2,406	8.3	19	4	152.9	69	228	3.3	0
Career		613	1,005	61.0	7,555	7.5	61	24	139.4	273	535	2.0	6

== Personal life ==
Clemens grew up herding cattle in eastern Oregon on his family's 3,500-acre (14 km^{2}) ranch in Burns, where they own over 100 head of cattle. As a young boy, Kellen enjoyed horseback riding in his spare time.

He has four younger sisters, and majored in Business Administration at the University of Oregon. He earned International League All Star recognition in 1998. He and his wife Nicole currently reside in Coeur d'Alene, Idaho where he is Board Chair and Athletic Director at Coeur du Christ Academy.

He is an active and practicing Roman Catholic, and is married with four children with a strong religious devotion to the Holy Family of Nazareth. In a February 2012 interview with the National Catholic Register, he noted that he has a special devotion to Our Lady of Mount Carmel, and that he wears the Brown Scapular in connection to this devotion. Clemens voted for Mitt Romney in the 2012 United States presidential election, claiming: "You have to vote for the candidate who is most pro-life." He is an active member of Catholic Athletes for Christ. Clemens also expressed a feeling of deep honor when Pope Benedict XVI blessed and kissed their four-week-old baby girl at the final procession of the Papal Mass on April 17, 2008, at Nationals Park in Washington D.C..
