= 2004 Stanford Cardinal football team =

American college football season

2004 Stanford Cardinal football
- Conference: Pacific-10 Conference
- Record: 4–7 (2–6 Pac-10)
- Head coach: Buddy Teevens (3rd season)
- Offensive coordinator: Bill Cubit (2nd season)
- Offensive scheme: Spread
- Defensive coordinator: A. J. Christoff (3rd season)
- Base defense: 4–3
- Home stadium: Stanford Stadium

2004 Pacific-10 Conference football standings
	Conf.			Overall
Team	W		L	W		L
No. 1 USC † $	8	–	0	13	–	0
No. 9 California	7	–	1	10	–	2
No. 19 Arizona State	5	–	3	9	–	3
Oregon State	5	–	3	7	–	5
UCLA	4	–	4	6	–	6
Oregon	4	–	4	5	–	6
Washington State	3	–	5	5	–	6
Stanford	2	–	6	4	–	7
Arizona	2	–	6	3	–	8
Washington	0	–	8	1	–	10
$ – Conference champion; † – USC later vacated 2 wins (1 in conference), as well as the BCS and Pac-10 championships, due to NCAA sanctions.; Rankings from AP Poll

The 2004 Stanford Cardinal football team represented Stanford University in the 2004 NCAA Division I-A football season. The team was led by head coach Buddy Teevens.

== Schedule ==
Date	Time	Opponent	Site	TV	Result	Attendance
September 4	7:00 p.m.	San Jose State*	Stanford Stadium; Stanford, CA (rivalry)	KRON	W 43–3	39,750
September 17	7:00 p.m.	BYU*	Stanford Stadium; Stanford, CA	CSTV	W 37–10	31,500
September 25	4:00 p.m.	No. 1 USC	Stanford Stadium; Stanford, CA (rivalry)	TBS	L 28–31	55,750
October 2	2:00 p.m.	Washington	Stanford Stadium; Stanford, CA		W 27–13	27,550
October 9	11:30 a.m.	at Notre Dame*	Notre Dame Stadium; Notre Dame, IN (Legends Trophy)	NBC	L 15–23	80,795
October 16	7:15 p.m.	at Washington State	Martin Stadium; Pullman, WA	FSN	W 23–17	34,963
October 23	2:00 p.m.	Oregon^{†}	Stanford Stadium; Stanford, CA (rivalry)		L 13–16	33,250
October 30	12:30 p.m.	at UCLA	Rose Bowl; Pasadena, CA (rivalry)	FSN	L 0–21	54,021
November 6	3:30 p.m.	at No. 23 Arizona State	Sun Devil Stadium; Tempe, AZ	FSN	L 31–34	59,002
November 13	2:00 p.m.	Oregon State	Stanford Stadium; Stanford, CA		L 19–24	27,850
November 20	12:30 p.m.	at No. 4 California	California Memorial Stadium; Berkeley, CA (107th Big Game)	FSN	L 6–41	72,981
*Non-conference game; ^{†}Homecoming; Rankings from AP Poll released prior to the game; All times are in Pacific time

== Coaching staff ==
- Buddy Teevens – Head coach
- Bill Cubit – Offensive coordinator and quarterbacks
- Jay Boulware – Running backs
- Ken Margerum – Wide receivers
- George McDonald – Tight ends
- Steve Morton – Offensive line
- A.J. Christoff – Defensive coordinator
- Dave Tipton – Defensive tackles
- Peter McCarty – Defensive ends
- Tom Williams – Inside linebackers and associate head coach
- Tom Quinn – Outside linebackers and special teams coordinator

== Game summaries ==
=== BYU ===
Team	1	2	3	4	Total
BYU	10	0	0	0	10
• Stanford	7	10	7	13	37

- Date: September 11
- Location: Stanford Stadium, Stanford, CA
- Game start: 7:00 p.m. PDT
- TV announcers (CSTV): Tom McCarthy (Play-by-play), Tony McGee (Color) & Jenny Cavnar

Scoring summary
1	7:52	BYU	Naufahu Tahi 3 yard run (Matt Payne kick)	BYU 7–0
1	2:20	BYU	Matt Payne 40 yard field goal	BYU 10–0
1	2:08	STAN	T.J. Rushing 99 yard kickoff return (Michael Sgroi kick)	BYU 10–7
2	11:17	STAN	Alex Smith 1 yard pass from Trent Edwards (Michael Sgroi kick)	Stanford 14–10
2	:00	STAN	Michael Sgroi 19 yard field goal	Stanford 17–10
3	5:42	STAN	Justin McCollum 21 yard pass from Trent Edwards (Michael Sgroi kick)	Stanford 24–10
4	14:21	STAN	Evan Moore 24 yard pass from Trent Edwards (Michael Sgroi kick)	Stanford 31–10
4	11:46	STAN	Michael Sgroi 29 yard field goal	Stanford 34–10
4	9:51	STAN	Michael Sgroi 41 yard field goal	Stanford 37–10

=== Washington State ===
Team	1	2	3	4	Total
• Stanford	10	3	7	3	23
Washington State	3	0	0	14	17

- Date: October 16
- Location: Martin Stadium, Pullman, WA
- Game start: 7:15 p.m. PDT
- TV announcers (FSN): Barry Tompkins (Play-by-play) & Petros Papadakis (Color)

Scoring summary
1	10:39	WSU	Loren Langley 27 yard field goal	Wash St 3–0
1	4:57	STAN	Michael Sgroi 39 yard field goal	Tie 3–3
1	2:49	STAN	J.R. Lemon 2 yard run (Michael Sgroi kick)	Stanford 10–3
2	10:33	STAN	Michael Sgroi 20 yard field goal	Stanford 13–3
3	14:44	STAN	Evan Moore 67 yard pass from Trent Edwards (Michael Sgroi kick)	Stanford 20–3
4	14:23	WSU	Jerome Harrison 10 yard run (Loren Langley kick)	Stanford 20–10
4	12:09	WSU	Jason Hill 30 yard pass from Josh Swogger (Loren Langley kick)	Stanford 20–17
4	8:16	STAN	Michael Sgroi 47 yard field goal	Stanford 23–17
