= 2004 Washington Huskies football team =

American college football season

2004 Washington Huskies football
- Conference: Pacific-10 Conference
- Record: 1–10 (0–8 Pac-10)
- Head coach: Keith Gilbertson (2nd season)
- Offensive coordinator: John Pettas (2nd season)
- Offensive scheme: Spread
- Defensive coordinator: Phil Snow (2nd season)
- Base defense: 4–3
- MVPs: Kenny James (offense); Manase Hopoi (defense)
- Captains: Khalif Barnes; Charles Frederick; Derrick Johnson; Joe Lobendahn; Zach Tuiasosopo
- Home stadium: Husky Stadium

2004 Pacific-10 Conference football standings
	Conf.			Overall
Team	W		L	W		L
No. 1 USC † $	8	–	0	13	–	0
No. 9 California	7	–	1	10	–	2
No. 19 Arizona State	5	–	3	9	–	3
Oregon State	5	–	3	7	–	5
UCLA	4	–	4	6	–	6
Oregon	4	–	4	5	–	6
Washington State	3	–	5	5	–	6
Stanford	2	–	6	4	–	7
Arizona	2	–	6	3	–	8
Washington	0	–	8	1	–	10
$ – Conference champion; † – USC later vacated 2 wins (1 in conference), as well as the BCS and Pac-10 championships, due to NCAA sanctions.; Rankings from AP Poll

The 2004 Washington Huskies football team was an American football team that represented the University of Washington during the 2004 NCAA Division I-A football season. In its second and final season under head coach Keith Gilbertson, the team compiled a 1–10 record, winless in the Pacific-10 Conference, and was outscored by opponents 334 to 154.

This was Washington's first losing season since 1976. Following lopsided road losses at USC and Oregon, Gilbertson announced on the first of November that he would step down at the end of the season. The Huskies lost the remaining three games; the final loss at Washington State was UW's first Apple Cup defeat in seven years. Washington's most recent one-victory season was in 1969. The conference opponent not played this season was Arizona State.

== Schedule ==
Date	Time	Opponent	Site	TV	Result	Attendance
September 5	2:30 p.m.	Fresno State*	Husky Stadium; Seattle, WA	FSN	L 16–35	65,345
September 18	4:00 p.m.	UCLA	Husky Stadium; Seattle, WA	ABC	L 31–37	65,235
September 25	11:30 a.m.	at Notre Dame*	Notre Dame Stadium; Notre Dame, IN	NBC	L 3–38	80,795
October 2	2:00 p.m.	at Stanford	Stanford Stadium; Stanford, CA		L 13–27	27,550
October 9	12:30 p.m.	San Jose State*	Husky Stadium; Seattle, WA		W 21–6	65,816
October 16	12:30 p.m.	Oregon State	Husky Stadium; Seattle, WA		L 14–29	65,351
October 23	3:30 p.m.	at No. 1 USC	Memorial Coliseum; Los Angeles, CA	FSN	L 0–38	72,855
October 30	4:00 p.m.	at Oregon	Autzen Stadium; Eugene, OR (rivalry)	FSN	L 6–31	58,101
November 6	12:30 p.m.	Arizona^{†}	Husky Stadium; Seattle, WA		L 13–23	63,225
November 13	12:30 p.m.	No. 5 California	Husky Stadium; Seattle, WA		L 12–42	63,451
November 20	4:00 p.m.	at Washington State	Martin Stadium; Pullman, WA (Apple Cup)	ABC	L 25–28	34,334
*Non-conference game; ^{†}Homecoming; Rankings from AP Poll released prior to the game; All times are in Pacific time

== NFL draft ==
Two Huskies were selected in the 2005 NFL draft, which lasted seven rounds (255 selections).

Player	Position	Round	Overall	'Franchise
Khalif Barnes	T	2nd	52	Jacksonville Jaguars
Derrick Johnson	CB	6th	205	San Francisco 49ers
