= 2004 Las Vegas Bowl =

2004 Pioneer PureVision Las Vegas Bowl
- 13th Las Vegas Bowl
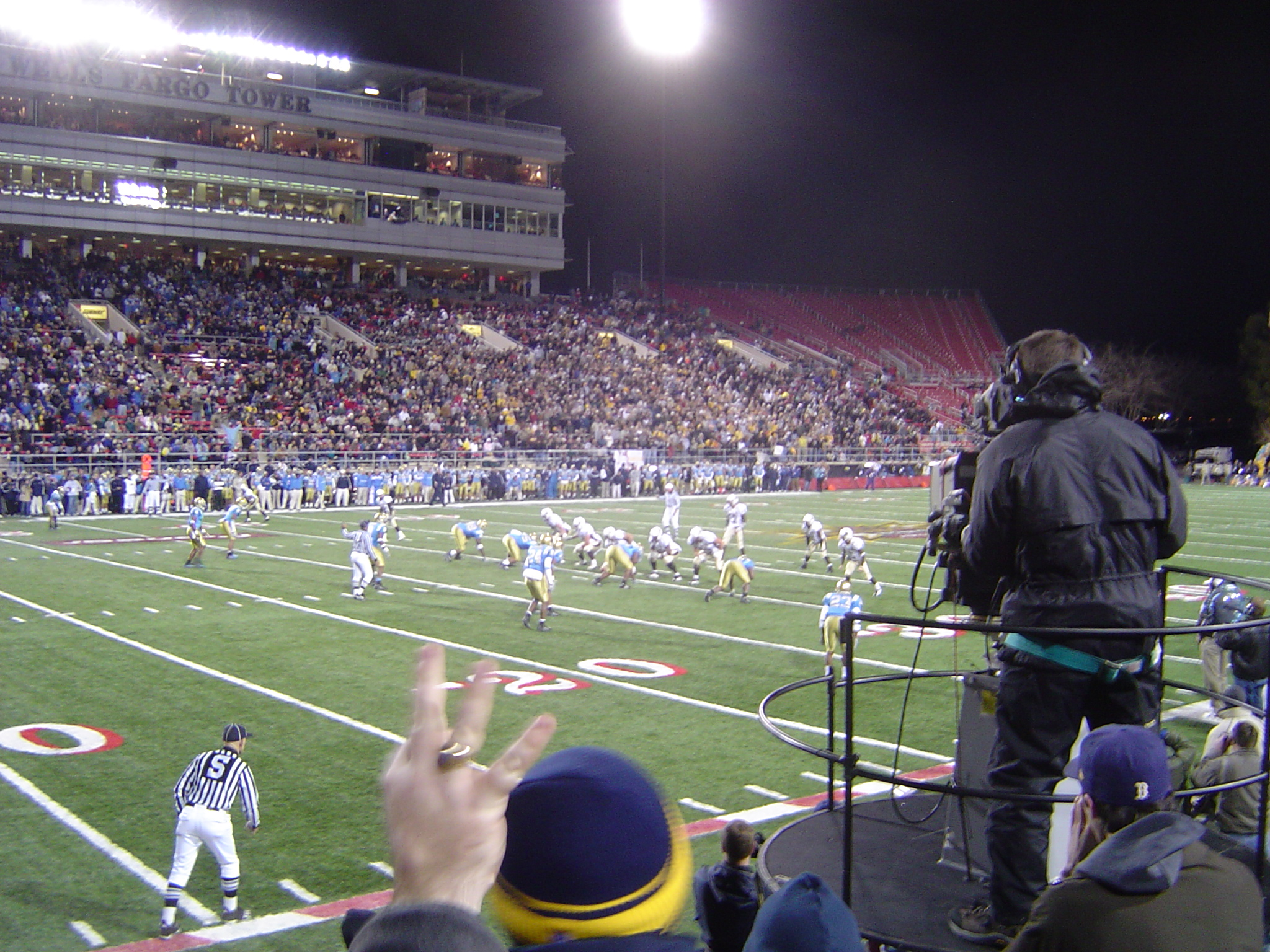
- UCLA (blue on defense) vs. Wyoming (white on offense)
Wyoming Cowboys	UCLA Bruins
(6–5)	(6–5)
Mountain West	Pac-10
24	21
Head coach: Joe Glenn	Head coach: Karl Dorrell
	1	2	3	4	Total
Wyoming	10	0	0	14	24
UCLA	0	14	7	0	21
- Date: December 23, 2004
- Season: 2004
- Stadium: Sam Boyd Stadium
- Location: Whitney, Nevada
- MVP: Corey Bramlet (Wyoming)
- Referee: Rocky Goode (SEC)
- Attendance: 29,062
- Payout: US$750,000 per team

United States TV coverage
- Network: ESPN
- Announcers: Ron Franklin (Play-by-Play); Mike Gottfried (Analyst); Erin Andrews (Sidelines)

The 2004 Pioneer PureVision Las Vegas Bowl was a post–season American college football bowl game, held on December 23, 2004, at Sam Boyd Stadium on the campus of the University of Nevada, Las Vegas, as a part of 2004–05 NCAA Bowl season. It was the 13th edition of the Las Vegas Bowl. The game featured the Wyoming Cowboys from the Mountain West Conference and the UCLA Bruins from the Pac-10 Conference. The game marked the first meeting between the two programs.

Wyoming appeared in their first Las Vegas Bowl, and their first trip to a bowl game since appearing in the 1993 Copper Bowl. It was their 11th bowl appearance in program history. The win ended the Cowboys' six-game bowl losing streak. UCLA made its second trip to the Las Vegas bowl, their 26th trip to a bowl, and third consecutive bowl trip. The Bruins had defeated the New Mexico Lobos 27–13 in the 2002 Las Vegas Bowl.

Wyoming upset UCLA, 24–21, on a 12–yard touchdown pass from Corey Bramlet to John Wadkowski with 57 seconds left in the game. The game was televised by ESPN.

== Game summary ==
UCLA wore their home blue uniforms, and Wyoming wore white visitor uniforms. MVP Corey Bramlet went 20–34 for 307 yards and 2 touchdowns. Maurice Jones-Drew rushed for 126 yards on 26 carries for the Bruins. The Cowboys out gained the Bruins in yardage, 405 to 311.

=== Statistics ===
Statistics	Wyoming	UCLA
First downs	19	19
Total offense, plays - yards	68-405	66-311
Rushes-yards (net)	30–76	42–126
Passing yards (net)	329	185
Passes, Comp-Att-Int	21-38-1	13-24-0
Time of Possession	30:11	29:49

=== Scoring summary ===
Scoring summary

Quarter	Time	Drive			Team	Scoring information	Score	
Quarter	Time	Plays	Yards	TOP	Team	Scoring information	Wyoming	UCLA
1	5:57	6	73	3:31	Wyoming	39-yard field goal by Deric Yaussi	3	0
1	4:11	3	29	1:29	Wyoming	Tyler Holden 10-yard touchdown reception from Corey Bramlet, Deric Yaussi kick good	10	0
2	7:58	5	56	2:03	UCLA	Junior Taylor 29-yard touchdown reception from Drew Olson, Justin Medlock kick good	10	7
2	1:50	4	30	1:21	UCLA	Craig Bragg 17-yard touchdown reception from David Koral, Justin Medlock kick good	10	14
3	7:11	12	80	5:43	UCLA	Craig Bragg 25-yard touchdown reception from David Koral, Justin Medlock kick good	10	21
4	12:50	6	63	2:44	Wyoming	J.J. Raterink 22-yard touchdown reception from Javon Bouknight, Deric Yaussi kick good	17	21
4	0:57	10	72	3:05	Wyoming	John Wadkowski 12-yard touchdown reception from Corey Bramlet, Deric Yaussi kick good	24	21
"TOP" = time of possession. For other American football terms, see Glossary of American football.							24	21
