= 2004 Insight Bowl =

- 16th Insight Bowl
Notre Dame Fighting Irish	Oregon State Beavers
(6–5)	(6–5)
Independent	Pac-10
21	38
Head coach: Kent Baer (interim)	Head coach: Mike Riley
	1	2	3	4	Total
Notre Dame	0	7	7	7	21
Oregon State	14	7	3	14	38
- Date: December 28, 2004
- Season: 2004
- Stadium: Bank One Ballpark
- Location: Phoenix, Arizona
- Referee: Doyle Jackson (SEC)
- Attendance: 45,917

The 2004 Insight Bowl was the 16th edition of the Insight Bowl. It featured the Notre Dame Fighting Irish, and the Oregon State Beavers.

Oregon State scored first on a 12-yard touchdown pass from Derek Anderson to wide receiver George Gillett to take a 7–0 lead. Derek Anderson later found tight end Joe Newton for an 11-yard touchdown pass to take a 14–0 lead.

In the second quarter Derek Anderson threw an 11-yard touchdown pass to Derek Haines, making it 21–0 OSU. Notre Dame got on the board with a 13-yard touchdown pass from Brady Quinn to Anthony Fasano, making the halftime score 21–7 Oregon State.

In the third quarter, Alexis Serna made a 38-yard field goal to increase Oregon State's lead to 24–7. Notre Dame running back Darius Walker scored on a 5-yard touchdown run to make it 24–14 Oregon State. In the fourth quarter, Derek Anderson threw his fourth touchdown pass of the game, a 1-yarder to Joe Newton to make it 31–14 Oregon State. Brady Quinn's 18-yard touchdown pass to Rhema McKnight, made it 31–21 OSU. A 2-yard Dwight Wright touchdown run made the final score 38–21 Oregon State.
