= 2004 UCLA Bruins football team =

American college football season

2004 UCLA Bruins football

Las Vegas Bowl, L 21–24 vs. Wyoming
- Conference: Pacific-10 Conference
- Record: 6–6 (4–4 Pac-10)
- Head coach: Karl Dorrell (2nd season)
- Offensive coordinator: Tom Cable (1st season)
- Offensive scheme: Multiple pro-style
- Defensive coordinator: Larry Kerr (2nd season)
- Base defense: 4–3
- Home stadium: Rose Bowl

2004 Pacific-10 Conference football standings
	Conf.			Overall
Team	W		L	W		L
No. 1 USC † $	8	–	0	13	–	0
No. 9 California	7	–	1	10	–	2
No. 19 Arizona State	5	–	3	9	–	3
Oregon State	5	–	3	7	–	5
UCLA	4	–	4	6	–	6
Oregon	4	–	4	5	–	6
Washington State	3	–	5	5	–	6
Stanford	2	–	6	4	–	7
Arizona	2	–	6	3	–	8
Washington	0	–	8	1	–	10
$ – Conference champion; † – USC later vacated 2 wins (1 in conference), as well as the BCS and Pac-10 championships, due to NCAA sanctions.; Rankings from AP Poll

The 2004 UCLA Bruins football team represented the University of California, Los Angeles in the 2004 NCAA Division I-A football season. They played their home games at the Rose Bowl in Pasadena, California and were coached by Karl Dorrell. It was Dorrell's second season as the UCLA head coach. UCLA was not ranked in the preseason polls. The Bruins finished 6–6 overall, and were tied for fifth place in the Pacific-10 Conference with a 4–4 record. The Bruins were invited to play in the Las Vegas Bowl vs. Wyoming on December 30, 2004.

== Key players ==
- Craig Bragg
- Maurice Drew
- Spencer Havner
- Justin London
- Drew Olson
- Manuel White Jr.

== Schedule ==
Date	Time	Opponent	Site	TV	Result	Attendance
September 4	12:30 pm	Oklahoma State*	Rose Bowl; Pasadena, CA	ABC	L 20–31	48,702
September 11	9:00 am	at Illinois*	Memorial Stadium; Champaign, IL	ABC	W 35–17	47,457
September 18	4:00 pm	at Washington	Husky Stadium; Seattle, WA	ABC	W 37–31	65,235
October 2	4:00 pm	San Diego State*	Rose Bowl; Pasadena, CA	FSNW2	W 33–10	52,038
October 9	3:30 pm	Arizona	Rose Bowl; Pasadena, CA	FSN	W 37–17	57,638
October 16	4:00 pm	at No. 8 California	California Memorial Stadium; Berkeley, CA (rivalry)	TBS	L 28–45	69,898
October 23	12:30 pm	at No. 21 Arizona State	Sun Devil Stadium; Tempe, AZ	ABC	L 42–48	63,985
October 30	12:30 pm	Stanford^{†}	Rose Bowl; Pasadena, CA (rivalry)	FSN	W 21–0	54,021
November 6	12:30 pm	Washington State	Rose Bowl; Pasadena, CA	FSNW2	L 29–31	62,251
November 13	12:30 pm	at Oregon	Autzen Stadium; Eugene, OR	ABC	W 34–26	58,344
December 4	1:30 pm	No. 1 USC	Rose Bowl; Pasadena, CA (Victory Bell)	ABC	L 24–29	88,442
December 23	7:00 pm	vs. Wyoming*	Sam Boyd Stadium; Whitney, NV (Las Vegas Bowl)	ESPN	L 21–24	29,062
*Non-conference game; ^{†}Homecoming; Rankings from AP; All times are in Pacific time

== Game summaries ==
=== Oklahoma State ===
Oklahoma State at UCLA

Team	1	2	3	4	Total
• Cowboys	7	21	3	0	31
Bruins	14	3	3	0	20

- Date: September 4, 2004
- Location: Rose Bowl, Pasadena, California
- Game start: 12:39 PM PST
- Elapsed time: 3:18
- Game attendance: 48,702
- Game weather: Bright and sunny, 95 °F (35 °C), 28% humidity, no wind
- Referee: Gordon Riese

=== Illinois ===
	1	2	3	4	Total
Bruins	14	7	7	7	35
Fighting Illini	0	7	7	3	17

=== Washington ===
	1	2	3	4	Total
Bruins	20	7	7	3	37
Huskies	24	0	7	0	31

=== San Diego State ===
	1	2	3	4	Total
Aztecs	3	0	7	0	10
Bruins	7	13	7	6	33

=== Arizona ===
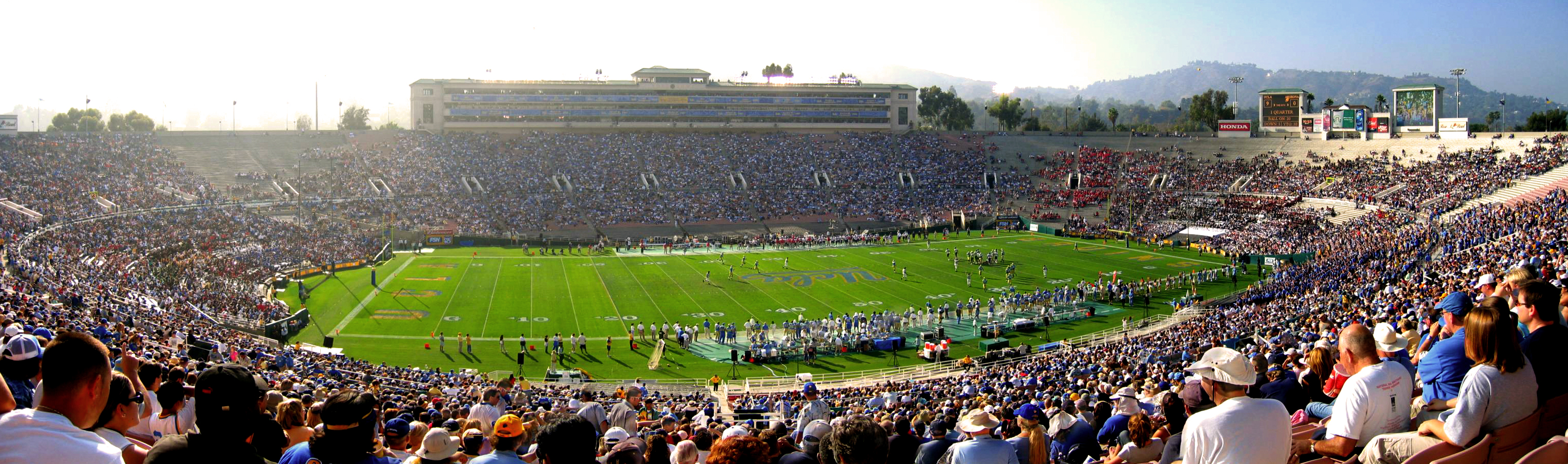
Panorama, first quarter

	1	2	3	4	Total
Wildcats	3	0	14	0	17
Bruins	9	14	7	7	37

=== California ===
	1	2	3	4	Total
Bruins	0	14	0	14	28
#8 Golden Bears	7	14	7	17	45

=== Arizona State ===
	1	2	3	4	Total
Bruins	3	17	15	7	42
#21 Sun Devils	14	7	10	17	48

=== Stanford ===
	1	2	3	4	Total
Cardinal	0	0	0	0	0
Bruins	7	7	0	7	21

=== Washington State ===
	1	2	3	4	Total
Cougars	14	7	3	7	31
Bruins	7	3	6	13	29

=== Oregon ===
	1	2	3	4	Total
Bruins	14	7	10	3	34
Ducks	7	3	10	6	26

=== USC ===
	1	2	3	4	Total
#1 Trojans	10	10	3	6	29
Bruins	0	10	7	7	24

=== Wyoming (Las Vegas Bowl) ===
Wyoming vs. UCLA

Team	1	2	3	4	Total
• Cowboys	10	0	0	14	24
Bruins	0	14	7	0	21

- Date: December 23, 2004
- Location: Sam Boyd Stadium, Whitney, Nevada
- Game start: 7:00 PM PST
- Elapsed time: 3:36
- Game attendance: 29,062
- Game weather: Partly cloudy, 42 °F (6 °C), 9 mph (14 km/h) N
- Referee: Rocky Goode
