= Ryan Riddle =

American football player (born 1981)

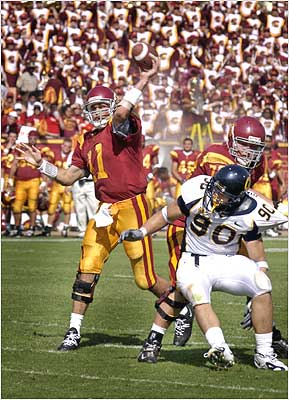

No. 57
- Position: Defensive end

Personal information
- Born: July 5, 1981 (age 45); Los Angeles, California, U.S.
- Listed height: 6 ft 2 in (1.88 m)
- Listed weight: 260 lb (118 kg)

Career information
- High school: Culver City (California)
- College: California
- NFL draft: 2005: 6th round, 212th overall pick

Career history
- Oakland Raiders (2005); New York Jets (2006); Atlanta Falcons (2007)*; Baltimore Ravens (2007)*; Los Angeles Avengers (2008); Calgary Stampeders (2009)*
- * Offseason or practice squad member only

Awards and highlights
- First-team All-American (2004); First-team All-Pac-10 (2004)

Career NFL statistics
- Tackles: 9
- Stats at Pro Football Reference

Career AFL statistics
- Tackles: 18
- Sacks: 4
- Forced fumbles: 1
- Fumble recoveries: 1
- Blocked kicks: 2
- Stats at ArenaFan.com

Ryan Riddle (born July 5, 1981) is an American former professional football player who was a defensive end in the National Football League (NFL). He was selected by the Oakland Raiders as a linebacker in the sixth round, with the 38th pick (212th overall) of the 2005 NFL draft. He played college football for the California Golden Bears.

Riddle was also a member of the New York Jets, Atlanta Falcons, Baltimore Ravens, Los Angeles Avengers and Calgary Stampeders.

== Early life ==
Ryan Riddle attended Culver City High School in Culver City, California, California. As a junior, he was Culver City's Most Improved Player, an All-Area second team honoree, and led the Bay League with 17 sacks. As a senior, he was the team Most Valuable Player, and an All-Bay League first team honoree and he finished his senior season with seven sacks, three blocked field goals, and 125 tackles. Ryan Riddle graduated from Culver City High School in 1999. He decided to go on to El Camino College after a two-year hiatus from football and turning down scholarship opportunities from several colleges.

== College career ==
Ended up as El Camino's team MVP his sophomore year on his way to receiving a scholarship from the University of California. While at El Camino he earned third-team JC All-American when he racked up 11 sacks, three blocked field goals, two blocked punts, three fumble recoveries, two caused fumbles, one interception and two touchdowns scored. He was also named to the 2002 All-Region IV Team by the California Community College Coaches Association/JC Athletic Bureau and tabbed first-team All-Northern Division.

Riddle was a team captain his sophomore season in 2002. He is currently ranked No. 3 in ECC history with 19 career sacks and is tied for fourth all-time in single-season sacks with 11 in 2002.

In 2024, he was inducted into El Camino College's Hall of Fame.

Riddle attended the University of California, Berkeley, and was a two-year letterman in football. As a senior, he posted a single season school record 14.5 sacks, and 49 tackles. Following the 2004 season, Riddle was voted Defensive MVP by teammates and selected as a second team All-American by the Associated Press.

== Professional career ==
Riddle was selected in the sixth round (212th overall) of the 2005 NFL draft by the Oakland Raiders. In September 2006, Riddle was cut by the Raiders. He signed with the New York Jets' active roster on September 27, 2006. He was released on December 16, 2006, and later signed on with the Atlanta Falcons. In August 2007, Riddle signed with the Baltimore Ravens, but was waived prior to the beginning of the 2007 regular season, despite a 2 sack performance against the Falcons.

After being waived by the Ravens, Riddle signed with the Los Angeles Avengers of the Arena Football League on a two-year contract. In his first and only season with the Avengers he set a franchise rookie sack record with 3.5. The next year the arena league opted to cancel their season.

Riddle was signed by the Calgary Stampeders on February 27, 2009, but was released shortly after.

== Personal life ==
Riddle wrote for the sports website Bleacher Report. He continues to evaluate NFL draft classes at the website he founded, draftmetric.com.

Riddle is the grandson of former USC Trojan fullback John Riddle and Helen Wheeler. John Riddle was the first Trojan to score four touchdowns in one game, and in 1924 he and Bryce Taylor of USC were the first African Americans to play against a southern college team. Helen Wheeler graduated from USC Law School in 1927, making her the school's first African American woman to do so.
