= 2004 Arizona Wildcats football team =

American college football season

2004 Arizona Wildcats football
- Conference: Pacific-10
- Record: 3–8 (2–6 Pac-10)
- Head coach: Mike Stoops (1st season)
- Offensive coordinator: Mike Canales (1st season)
- Offensive scheme: Pro-style
- Defensive coordinator: Mark Stoops (1st season)
- Base defense: 4–3
- Home stadium: Arizona Stadium

2004 Pacific-10 Conference football standings
	Conf.			Overall
Team	W		L	W		L
No. 1 USC † $	8	–	0	13	–	0
No. 9 California	7	–	1	10	–	2
No. 19 Arizona State	5	–	3	9	–	3
Oregon State	5	–	3	7	–	5
UCLA	4	–	4	6	–	6
Oregon	4	–	4	5	–	6
Washington State	3	–	5	5	–	6
Stanford	2	–	6	4	–	7
Arizona	2	–	6	3	–	8
Washington	0	–	8	1	–	10
$ – Conference champion; † – USC later vacated 2 wins (1 in conference), as well as the BCS and Pac-10 championships, due to NCAA sanctions.; Rankings from AP Poll

The 2004 Arizona Wildcats football team represented the University of Arizona during the 2004 NCAA Division I-A football season. They were coached by Mike Stoops in his first season with the Wildcats, after taking over the program after a disastrous 2003 season that led to the firing of former Arizona coach John Mackovic.

Arizona finished the season with a record of 3–8 (2–6 against Pac-10 opponents), which was a slight improvement from 2003. A major highlight of the year was an upset victory over rival Arizona State in the finale that showed signs that the program was returning to relevance.

== Schedule ==
Date	Time	Opponent	Site	TV	Result	Attendance	Source
September 4	7:00 p.m.	No. 14 (I-AA) Northern Arizona*	Arizona Stadium; Tucson, AZ	FSNAZ	W 21–3	49,741	
September 11	7:00 p.m.	No. 17 Utah*	Arizona Stadium; Tucson, AZ	FSNAZ	L 6–23	52,790	
September 18	1:00 p.m.	Wisconsin*	Arizona Stadium; Tucson, AZ	FSN	L 7–9	50,275	
September 25	12:30 p.m.	Washington State	Arizona Stadium; Tucson, AZ	ABC	L 19–20	43,579	
October 9	3:30 p.m.	at UCLA	Rose Bowl; Pasadena, CA	FSN	L 17–37	57,638	
October 16	12:30 p.m.	at Oregon	Autzen Stadium; Eugene, OR	ESPN Plus	L 14–28	58,237	
October 23	4:00 p.m.	No. 7 California	Arizona Stadium; Tucson, AZ	FSN	L 0–38	52,049	
October 30	4:00 p.m.	Oregon State^{†}	Arizona Stadium; Tucson, AZ	FSNAZ	L 14–28	47,245	
November 6	1:30 p.m.	at Washington	Husky Stadium; Seattle, WA	FSN	W 23–13	63,225	
November 13	8:15 p.m.	at No. 1 USC	Los Angeles Memorial Coliseum; Los Angeles, CA	FSN	L 9–49	80,167	
November 26	1:00 p.m.	No. 18 Arizona State	Arizona Stadium; Tucson, AZ (rivalry)	FSN	W 34–27	55,095	
*Non-conference game; ^{†}Homecoming; Rankings from AP Poll released prior to the game; All times are in Mountain time

== Before the season ==
At the conclusion of the 2003 season, Arizona hired Stoops to take over the team and clean up the mess that was caused by Mackovic's troubles that had started late in the 2002 season. Stoops, who coached the defense under his brother Bob at Oklahoma, was brought to Arizona in an attempt to bring the Wildcats back to their winning formula that was lost under Mackovic. Stoops referred to Arizona as a "filthy football program" due to Mackovic's issues and said that it was "so dirty that it needed to be cleaned up" for the team to win and to return them to prominence as they did in most of the 1980s and 1990s under coaches Larry Smith and Dick Tomey, and that he would make them contenders for the Rose Bowl as a coach, which has been a main goal for the Wildcats since they joined the Pac-10 in 1978.

Stoops would bring in a new coaching staff that included his other brother Mark, who would become the defensive coordinator. He would spend the offseason rebuilding the program, recruiting players, and building chemistry to the team as well as restoring honesty to a program that Mackovic could not do. Also, to get prepared for the 2004 season, the Wildcats would introduce blue helmets that would worn during the season and it would be the first time since 1980 that they would not wear their traditional white helmets, with Stoops believing that blue helmets would help the team win as a good luck symbol.

By the start of the preseason, fans felt that excitement was being brought to the program as a result of Stoops' rebuilding of the team, leading to an increase in ticket sales that had decreased in 2003 due to the Mackovic scandals. Although Arizona's schedule was somewhat difficult, Stoops was confident that the Wildcats would compete.

== Game summaries ==
=== Northern Arizona ===
	1	2	3	4	Total
Northern Arizona	0	3	0	0	3
Arizona	7	0	0	14	21

The Wildcats began the Stoops era by hosting in-state foe Northern Arizona (also known as NAU) in the opener. Arizona's rebuilt and dynamic offense would start off hot and took an early lead before NAU got on the board with a field goal. The score remained at 7–3 for most of the game as both teams relied on defense. In the fourth quarter, the Wildcats would break the game open with a pair of touchdowns and gave Stoops his first win in his coaching debut.

=== Utah ===
	1	2	3	4	Total
Utah	17	0	6	0	23
Arizona	3	3	0	0	6

In their next game, Stoops and the Wildcats hosted Utah. The Utes came in the game ranked 17th, making it a tough test for Arizona. As the game fell on the third anniversary of the 9/11 terrorist attacks, there was a moment of silence before the game to commemorate the victims and honoring American soldiers fighting overseas.

Utah would take control early and Arizona's offense sputtered at times. In the end, the Utes pulled away and Stoops lost for the first time as coach. The Wildcats made several trips into Utah and only came up with two field goals, which was the first time since September 2003 that Arizona successfully made a field goal (which was against TCU, the last game prior to Mackovic getting fired). Utah would ultimately finish the year with a perfect 12–0 record.

=== Wisconsin ===
	1	2	3	4	Total
Wisconsin	0	0	0	9	9
Arizona	0	7	0	0	7

The Wildcats next faced Wisconsin. In a game that was delayed before halftime due to inclement weather (mostly lightning and rain), there was very little offense for both teams, perhaps as a result of the wet field. Arizona led 7–0 after three quarters and was pitching a shutout before the Badgers came back to take the lead in the fourth quarter. In the game's final minute, the Wildcats drove into Wisconsin territory and would miss a field goal that would have potentially given them the lead. Instead, Arizona's record dropped to 1–2.

=== Washington State ===
	1	2	3	4	Total
Washington State	7	0	0	13	20
Arizona	0	7	6	6	19

In their (and Stoops') Pac-10 opener, the Wildcats hosted Washington State. After a tied first half, Arizona kicked a pair of field goals in the third quarter to lead entering the fourth. The Cougars would answer with a touchdown before the Wildcats answered back with their own and Arizona led 19–14 (they would miss on a two-point conversion). After stopping Washington State on defense, the Wildcats' offense attempted to run out the clock late, but would lose a fumble that would lead to the Cougars having a chance. Washington State would find the end zone to retake the lead at 20–19 (they would also miss a two-pointer). Arizona had one last chance, but would gain nothing to lose another heartbreaker.

=== UCLA ===
	1	2	3	4	Total
Arizona	3	0	14	0	17
UCLA	9	14	7	7	37

Arizona went on the road for the first time in the season as they visited the Rose Bowl to face UCLA. The Bruins would dominate the first half and in the second half, the Wildcats tried to come back. However, UCLA broke it open with a couple more scores and Stoops lost in his road debut.

=== Oregon ===
	1	2	3	4	Total
Arizona	0	0	0	14	14
Oregon	7	7	7	7	28

Arizona traveled to Oregon for the first time since 2000 to take on the Ducks. Oregon would dominate on defense as the Wildcats made mistakes which led to the Ducks leading 28–0 in the fourth quarter. Arizona avoided a shutout late in the quarter with two quick score to cut Oregon's lead in half, but would run out of time and lost their fifth straight game.

=== California ===
	1	2	3	4	Total
California	7	21	0	10	38
Arizona	0	0	0	0	0

Arizona returned home to face seventh-ranked California. It was the Wildcats' first home meeting against the Golden Bears since 1997. With five losses, Arizona needed to win out for the rest of the season to have a shot at a bowl bid. However, things would not get easy for them as they had to deal with a tough California squad.

Cal's offense, led by future NFL MVP Aaron Rodgers, would take control of the game by halftime and capitalized on several Arizona turnovers and the Wildcats never recovered as they were shutout by the Bears. The loss was the sixth consecutive for the Wildcats, and essentially ended any chance at the postseason for them. To date, this is the Golden Bears' most recent win over the Wildcats in Tucson.

=== Oregon State ===
	1	2	3	4	Total
Oregon State	14	0	7	7	28
Arizona	0	0	7	7	14

For homecoming weekend, the Wildcats hosted Oregon State for the first time since 2000. As they won the previous homecoming game in 2003 that was big for them, Arizona hoped to earn the same feat.

The Wildcats believed that the homecoming festivities could change their fortunes and gave Stoops his first conference win. However, it all came for naught as they continued to make crucial errors and the Beavers cashed them in for points. Arizona played better in the second half, but it was not enough as Oregon State handed the Wildcats their seventh loss in a row. The loss would lead to the same story for Wildcat fans, as they began to give up on the season become more interested in basketball.

=== Washington ===
	1	2	3	4	Total
Arizona	9	0	14	0	23
Washington	10	3	0	0	13

Arizona traveled to Seattle to face a struggling Washington team. Both teams at the time had only a single victory on the season and looked for their first conference win.

The Huskies would lead 13–9 at the half after both teams' defenses played good. In the second half, the turning point of the game occurred when the Wildcats returned a fumble for a touchdown to take the lead for good and Arizona added another score to win it 23–13 for their elusive second win of the season and broke their seven-game losing streak. Also, this was the fourth consecutive year that the Wildcats won their first conference game in November. With the victory, Stoops finally earned his first Pac-10 win as coach and it was the second consecutive season that a Wildcat victory over the Huskies in early November led to their first conference win.

In addition, it was Arizona's first win in Seattle since 1998 (when the Wildcats won on their infamous touchdown somersault) and erasing memories of their heartbreaking losses to the Huskies in their previous trips from 2000 to 2002. Ironically, it was Arizona's first Pac-10 win since they defeated Washington in Tucson in the previous year, and snapped a six-game conference losing streak at the time. They also scored more than 20 points for the first time since their season-opening win against NAU.

=== USC ===
	1	2	3	4	Total
Arizona	3	0	6	0	9
USC	0	14	21	14	49

The Wildcats traveled to USC to face the top-ranked Trojans and their dominant NFL-style offense. In Stoops' first true test, Arizona struck first on a field goal for the only score of the first quarter. From the second quarter onward, USC would live up to its top ranking by dominating the rest of the game by outscoring the Wildcats 49–6 to break it open and hand Arizona its eighth loss of the year. The Trojans would ultimately capture both the Pac-10 title and the national championship.

=== Arizona State ===
Team	1	2	3	4	Total
Arizona State	10	7	0	10	27
• Arizona	3	17	7	7	34

- Date: November 26
- Location: Arizona Stadium • Tucson, Arizona
- Game start: 3:00 p.m. EST
- Game attendance: 55,095
- Television network: FSN

Scoring summary
1	10:02	ASU	Jesse Ainsworth 21-yard field goal	ASU 3–0
1	5:27	ARIZ	Nick Folk 53-yard field goal	Tied 3–3
1	0:32	ASU	Hakim Hill 1-yard run (Ainsworth kick)	ASU 10–3
2	11:01	ARIZ	Steve Fleming 54-yard pass from Richard Kovalcheck (Folk kick)	Tied 10–10
2	6:14	ARIZ	Folk 23-yard field goal	ARIZ 13–10
2	4:16	ASU	Jimmy Verdon 24-yard fumble return (Ainsworth kick)	ASU 17–13
2	0:07	ARIZ	Mike Jefferson 2-yard pass from Kovalcheck (Folk kick)	ARIZ 20–17
3	9:53	ARIZ	Gilbert Harris 6-yard run (Folk kick)	ARIZ 27–17
4	14:11	ASU	Ainsworth 36-yard field goal	ARIZ 27–20
4	9:32	ARIZ	Jefferson 47-yard pass from Kovalcheck (Folk kick)	ARIZ 34–20
4	5:05	ASU	Jamaal Lewis 3-yard pass from Sam Keller (Ainsworth kick)	ARIZ 34–27

In the season finale, the Wildcats hosted 18th-ranked Arizona State in Stoops' first "Duel in the Desert". Despite being a tough test for the Wildcats, Stoops believed that the team would compete against ASU due to the game being played in Tucson and that the home-field advantage would help Arizona end the season on a high note.

After both teams started the game with a field goal, ASU would get a touchdown near the end of the opening quarter to lead 10–3. In the second quarter, Arizona would tie it with a touchdown of their own before taking the lead on their next possession on a field goal. The Sun Devils would then retake the lead after returning a fumble for a touchdown. The Wildcats responded by driving into ASU territory in the final minute and scored a touchdown to regain the lead at 20–17 before halftime.

Arizona would grab momentum in the third quarter by causing an ASU turnover which led to a Wildcat touchdown that extended their lead at 27–17. By the fourth quarter, ASU made another field goal to get within 27–20 before the Wildcats would force another Arizona State turnover later on and cashed in with another score to go up 34–20 with under ten minutes left that seemingly gave them control. However, the Devils responded despite their quarterback going down with an injury, with their backup leading them down the field and scoring to cut Arizona's lead to seven with over five minutes remaining. After forcing the Wildcats to punt, ASU got the ball back for one final chance with over two minutes left to play and drove into Arizona territory, threatening to force overtime. However, they would turn the ball over on downs and the Wildcats would run out the clock to give Stoops his first rivalry win as coach. Arizona fans rushed the field after the game to celebrate the Wildcats' upset victory and Arizona brought the Territorial Cup trophy back to Tucson for the first time since 2001. In addition, it was the Wildcats' first home victory over the Sun Devils since 1998. The win also snapped the Wildcats' streak of 18 straight losses against ranked opponents, which was the longest in Arizona history. Also, the 34 points were the most that Arizona scored in a game for the entire season. With the Wildcats wearing their all-blue uniforms (blue helmets, blue jerseys, and blue pants), it was their first win in program history when wearing the all-blue look.

The Wildcats' defense came up big by playing their best game of the season, as they forced five turnovers, including four fumble recoveries, and also blocking a field goal attempt, with the turnovers leading to 31 Arizona points, which was a big factor in the win. With the win, the Wildcats won their second conference game of the season and ended the year with a 3–8 record, and the victory over the Sun Devils would lead to fans believing at the time that Stoops was building a bright future despite a losing record.

== Roster ==
2004 Arizona Wildcats football team roster
Players
Coaches
Offense

Pos.	#	Name	Class
RB	11	Mike Bell	Jr
WR	82	Biren Ealy	Jr
FB	36	Gilbert Harris	Jr
RB	27	Chris Henry	Fr
WR	83	Mike Jefferson	So
G	66	Kili Lefotu	Jr
WR	1	Syndric Steptoe	So

Defense

Pos.	#	Name	Class
DE	31	Copeland Bryan	Jr
CB	5	Antoine Cason	Fr
DE	54	Lionel Dotson	Fr
CB	3	Wilrey Fontenot	Fr
LB	33	Ronnie Palmer	Fr
DE	53	Jason Parker	Fr
DE	55	Marcus Smith	Jr
DE	56	Andre Torrey	Jr

Special teams

Pos.	#	Name	Class
P	43	Danny Baugher	Jr
K	16	Nick Folk	So

Head coach

- Mike Stoops

Coordinators/assistant coaches

Legend

- (C) Team captain
- (S) Suspended
- (I) Ineligible
- Injured
- Redshirt

== Awards and honors ==
- Mike Bell, RB, Second-team All-Pac-10
- Antoine Cason, CB, Second-team All-Pac-10

== Season notes ==
- Arizona won their season opener against NAU, which became the first step in Stoops' progress of rebuilding the Wildcats to success.
- The Wildcats played their first four games of the season at home.
- Arizona started the season against the same non-conference opponents in the same order as they did in 2002 (NAU, Utah, and Wisconsin), though the game against Wisconsin was played in Tucson.
- The game against Wisconsin is the most recent meeting between the Wildcats and Badgers and is the closest that Arizona has come to winning, as they came within a made field goal of victory.
- The Wildcats played at the Rose Bowl against UCLA for the first time since 1999.
- The losses to the two Oregon schools were by an identical score of 28–14.
- The game at Oregon was shown on pay-per-view, as broadcasters (primarily FSN) had their schedules full and that both Arizona and Oregon had mediocre records.
- Arizona played and lost to Utah and California, both of which featured future NFL quarterbacks (Alex Smith for Utah and Aaron Rodgers for California, with the latter winning a Super Bowl in 2010 with the Packers).
- This was the second consecutive season that the Wildcats would win their first Pac-10 game in November against Washington.
- Arizona gave up 45 or more points against USC for the second year in a row, as they knew that the Trojans' offense was difficult to stop due to their talent.
- Prior to the finale against Arizona State, the Wildcats' win–loss pattern nearly looked identical from the 2003 season, as Arizona won the season opener and then going on a long losing streak before winning in November (in this case, against Washington) and then losing to USC. With Arizona winning over ASU, the pattern would not be the same in back-to-back seasons.
- The win over Arizona State would become Stoops' first of several big upset wins over ranked conference opponents in November, perhaps giving hope for the Wildcats' future as he would rebuild the team to its winning ways.
- Arizona's rebuilt defense under Stoops almost single-handedly kept the team in most of its games during the season, though the offense struggled at time to score more points, which, along with mistakes such as turnovers and penalties, would cost the Wildcats a few wins and possibly a bowl appearance. In addition, Arizona had young and inexperienced players that were starters, which was also a factor in their 3–8 record.
- Arizona did not play Pac-10 opponent Stanford for the second straight season.
- This was the first season since 2001 that the Wildcats won at least two conference games.
- Arizona's two home wins this season were against in-state opponents (Northern Arizona and Arizona State, also known as NAU and ASU respectively).
- Arizona wore blue pants in all four of their road games.
- The Wildcats improved on special teams, as they made eight field goals on 13 tries after going converting only two kicks out of 11 tries in 2003.
- This season would become the first in the Stoops era that was known for Stoops having a history of arguing with game officials on the sidelines over certain calls that did not go Arizona's way, and that the arguments would often be shown on TV cameras.

== After the season ==
Although the Wildcats finished the 2004 season with a 3–8 record, it showed a sign of the team recovering from the disastrous Mackovic era as Stoops fulfilled his promise of rebuilding the program and that it would take a few seasons to get them to compete for a winning success. Although the end of the season, particularly the rivalry victory over ASU, would seem forgotten when Arizona's basketball team became dominant and made a deep postseason run in the spring of 2005, the football team would continue to improve and prepare for a bright future. In 2008, the Wildcats would finally earn a winning season under Stoops, who would ultimately be fired in 2011 after the Wildcats would return to mediocrity. Many Arizona supporters credited Stoops for the team's resurgence following the Mackovic disaster by restoring success in the late 2000s.
