= 2004 Washington State Cougars football team =

American college football season

2004 Washington State Cougars football
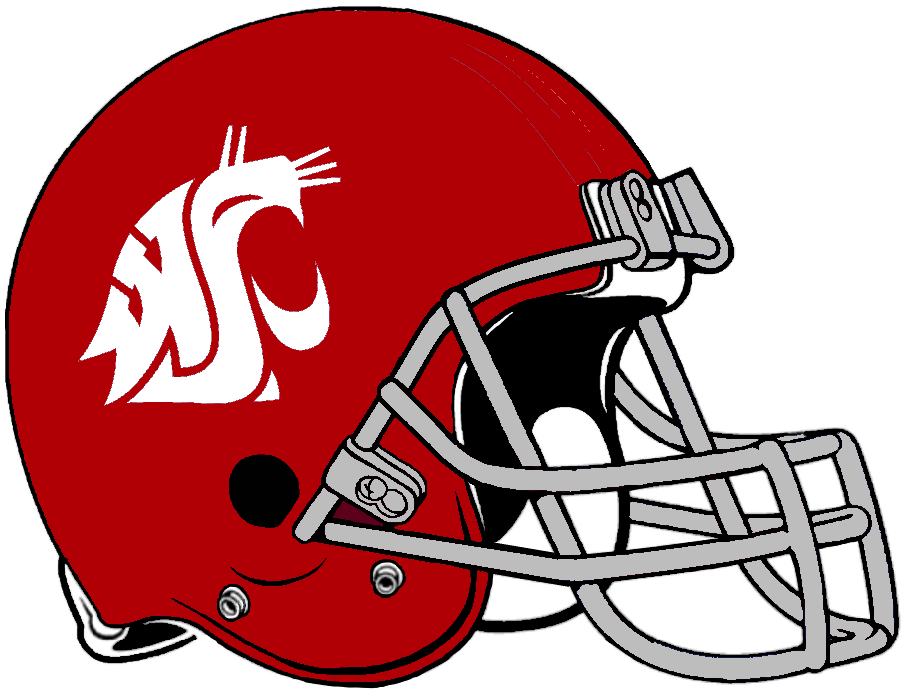
- Conference: Pacific-10 Conference
- Record: 5–6 (3–5 Pac-10)
- Head coach: Bill Doba (2nd season)
- Offensive coordinator: Mike Levenseller (4th season)
- Offensive scheme: Spread
- Defensive coordinator: Robb Akey (2nd season)
- Base defense: 4–3
- Home stadium: Martin Stadium

2004 Pacific-10 Conference football standings
	Conf.			Overall
Team	W		L	W		L
No. 1 USC † $	8	–	0	13	–	0
No. 9 California	7	–	1	10	–	2
No. 19 Arizona State	5	–	3	9	–	3
Oregon State	5	–	3	7	–	5
UCLA	4	–	4	6	–	6
Oregon	4	–	4	5	–	6
Washington State	3	–	5	5	–	6
Stanford	2	–	6	4	–	7
Arizona	2	–	6	3	–	8
Washington	0	–	8	1	–	10
$ – Conference champion; † – USC later vacated 2 wins (1 in conference), as well as the BCS and Pac-10 championships, due to NCAA sanctions.; Rankings from AP Poll

The 2004 Washington State Cougars football team represented Washington State University as a member of the Pacific-10 Conference during the 2004 NCAA Division I-A football season. Led by second-year head coach Bill Doba, the Cougars compiled an overall record of 5–6 with a mark of 3–5 in conference play, placing seventh in the Pac-10. Washington State played home games at Martin Stadium in Pullman, Washington.

== Schedule ==
Date	Time	Opponent	Site	TV	Result	Attendance	Source
September 3	5:00 pm	at New Mexico*	University Stadium; Albuquerque, NM	ESPN	W 21–17	34,860	
September 11	12:30 pm	Colorado*	Qwest Field; Seattle, WA (Cougar Gridiron Classic)	ABC	L 12–20	56,188	
September 18	7:30 pm	Idaho*	Martin Stadium; Pullman, WA (Battle of the Palouse)	FSNNW	W 49–8	34,858	
September 25	12:30 pm	at Arizona	Arizona Stadium; Tucson, AZ	ABC	W 20–19	43,579	
October 9	2:00 pm	Oregon	Martin Stadium; Pullman, WA		L 38–41	35,117	
October 16	7:15 pm	Stanford^{†}	Martin Stadium; Pullman, WA	FSN	L 17–23	34,963	
October 23	1:05 pm	at Oregon State	Reser Stadium; Corvallis, OR		L 19–38	36,265	
October 30	4:00 pm	No. 1 USC	Martin Stadium; Pullman, WA	ABC	L 12–42	35,117	
November 6	12:30 pm	at UCLA	Rose Bowl; Pasadena, CA	FSNW2	W 31–29	62,259	
November 13	4:00 pm	at No. 20 Arizona State	Sun Devil Stadium; Tempe, AZ	TBS	L 14–38	60,319	
November 20	4:00 pm	Washington	Martin Stadium; Pullman, WA (Apple Cup)	ABC	W 28–25	34,334	
*Non-conference game; ^{†}Homecoming; Rankings from AP Poll released prior to the game; All times are in Pacific time

== Season summary ==
=== Washington ===
Team	1	2	3	4	Total
Washington	10	0	7	8	25
• Washington State	14	7	7	0	28

- Date: November 20
- Location: Martin Stadium, Pullman, Washington
- Game start: 4:00 p.m. PST
- Source: ESPN

Scoring summary
1	13:24	WASH	Evan Knudson 19 yard field goal	Washington 3-0
1	7:40	WSU	Troy Bienemann 6 yard pass from Alex Brink (Loren Langley kick)	Wash St 7-3
1	4:56	WASH	Joe Toledo 4 yard pass from Casey Paus (Evan Knudson kick)	Washington 10-7
1	2:07	WSU	Alex Brink 1 yard run (Loren Langley kick)	Wash St 14-10
2	4:07	WSU	Will Derting recovered fumble in end zone (Loren Langley kick)	Wash St 21-10
3	9:56	WSU	Jason Hill 22 yard pass from Alex Brink (Loren Langley kick)	Wash St 28-10
3	4:26	WASH	Isaiah Stanback 1 yard run (Evan Knudson kick)	Wash St 28-17
4	4:04	WASH	Craig Chambers 29 yard pass from Isaiah Stanback (Craig Chambers pass from Isaiah Stanback)	Wash St 28-25
