= Josh Swogger =

American football player (born 1983)

Josh Swogger (born May 10, 1983) is an American football quarterback.

== Early life ==
Swogger went to Mathews High School in Vienna Township, Trumbull County, Ohio and Ursuline High School in Youngstown, Ohio, where he went on to win the Division 4 state championship as the starting quarterback.

== College career ==
Swogger played at the University of Montana after transferring from Washington State.

== Professional career ==
Swogger was invited to National Football League minicamp with the Kansas City Chiefs in May 2007. Swogger also received tryouts from the Buffalo Bills and Atlanta Falcons before joining the Arena Football League, where he would play one season.

== Post-NFL career ==
In May 2010, after playing in the Arena Football League, Swogger became a licensed insurer with Western & Southern Financial Group in Youngstown, Ohio. In May 2015, Swogger was named the vice president of the company.

== Personal life ==
Swogger and his wife Angie married on December 29, 2004, and have 3 children: Abigail (born 2008), Madison (born 2010), and Gabrielle (born 2012).
