= Terrence Whitehead =

American gridiron football player (born 1983)

No. 30
- Position: Running back

Personal information
- Born: May 31, 1983 (age 43); Gardena, California, U.S.
- Listed height: 5 ft 10 in (1.78 m)
- Listed weight: 205 lb (93 kg)

Career information
- College: Oregon
- NFL draft: 2006: undrafted

Career history
- Cincinnati Bengals (2006); BC Lions (2008)*; Las Vegas Locomotives (2009)*
- * Offseason or practice squad member only

Terrence Harrell Whitehead (born May 31, 1983) is an American former football running back. He was signed by the Cincinnati Bengals as an undrafted free agent in 2006. He played college football at Oregon.

Whitehead was also a member of the BC Lions and Las Vegas Locomotives.
