= Dallman =

Dallman is a surname. It is the Americanized version of the German surname Dallmann. The name means 'inhabitant of a valley.'

Notable people with the surname include:

- Kevin Dallman (born 1981), Canadian-Kazakhstani professional ice hockey defenceman
- Marty Dallman (born 1963), Canadian former ice hockey player
- Matthew Dallman (born 1985), American soccer player
- Petra Dallman, also known as Petra Dallmann, (born 1978), German swimmer
- Rod Dallman (born 1967), retired Canadian professional ice hockey left winger

== See also ==
- Dahlman (disambiguation)
- Dailiman
- Dalaman
- Dallam (disambiguation)
- Dallan (disambiguation)
- Dalman
- Dalmand
- Dalmane
- Dalmanites
- Dalmasan
- Dalmau
- Dalyan
- Daylaman
- Delman
- Dillman (disambiguation)
- Dillmann
- Dilman
- Dollman (disambiguation)
- Dolman
- Tallman (disambiguation)
- Talman (disambiguation)
