= Miracle in Miami =

American football play involving the Miami Dolphins and the New England Patriots

Miami Miracle
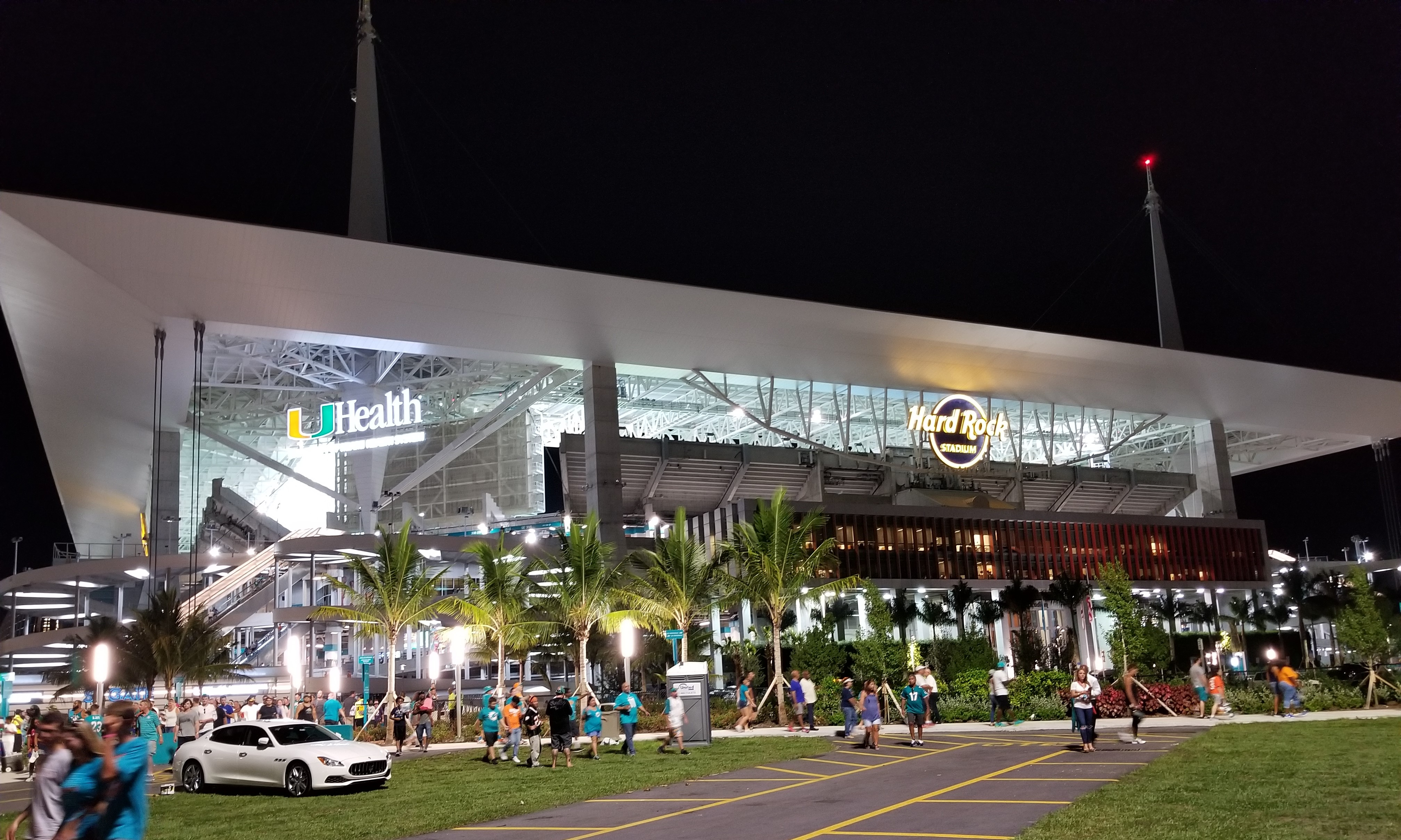
- Hard Rock Stadium, the site of the game.
New England Patriots (9–3)	Miami Dolphins (6–6)
33	34
Head coach: Bill Belichick	Head coach: Adam Gase
	1	2	3	4	Total
NE	6	21	0	6	33
MIA	7	14	7	6	34
- Date: December 9, 2018
- Stadium: Hard Rock Stadium; Miami Gardens, Florida
- Favorite: Patriots by 9.5
- Referee: Pete Morelli
- Attendance: 66,087

TV in the United States
- Network: CBS
- Announcers: Ian Eagle, Dan Fouts, and Evan Washburn

The Miracle in Miami, also known as the Miami Miracle, was an American football play that took place at the end of a National Football League regular season game on December 9, 2018, between the Miami Dolphins and the New England Patriots. It was the first and only walk-off touchdown in NFL history to date to involve multiple lateral passes, and the first multi-lateral touchdown since the River City Relay in December 2003. After the game, the play was known by several names, most commonly the "Miami Miracle" and the "Miracle in Miami". The play went on to win the Bridgestone Performance Play of the Year award at the 8th NFL Honors awards show on February 2.

== History ==
Desperation lateral attempts have been used before in American football. In the history of the NFL, only once in the 21st century has a team successfully converted a lateral pass for a touchdown at the end of a game. It occurred in the River City Relay on December 21, 2003, where the New Orleans Saints successfully completed three lateral passes culminating in a 75-yard touchdown by Jerome Pathon against the Jacksonville Jaguars. However, kicker John Carney missed the extra point, resulting in a 20–19 loss by the Saints.

On December 8, 2013, Miami almost lost to the Pittsburgh Steelers via lateral passes. Referees correctly ruled Antonio Brown, the last Steeler to touch the ball on that play, out of bounds at the 13-yard line to end that game in a Miami victory.

== Lead-up to the play ==
Entering the game, the Patriots were leading the AFC East with a record of 9–3, while the Dolphins had a record of 6–6. A Patriots win would clinch them their 10th consecutive division title. After the Patriots struck first with a touchdown, there would be a total of eight lead changes, but Patriots kicker Stephen Gostkowski would miss not only the extra point on the aforementioned first touchdown, but a field goal attempt later on. Leading 30–28 after an unsuccessful attempt to score a touchdown in the waning seconds, he would score another field goal to put them up 33–28 with 16 seconds left to play.

== The play ==
Trailing by five points with seven seconds to go, the Dolphins had the ball at their own 31-yard line. Quarterback Ryan Tannehill threw a pass over the middle that was caught by wide receiver Kenny Stills, who lateraled the ball to the right side of the field that was caught by DeVante Parker at midfield. Parker then tossed the ball backward to running back Kenyan Drake, who ran the ball 52 yards for a touchdown to win the game 34–33. The Dolphins declined to kick the extra point, per the rule change for the 2018 season following the Minneapolis Miracle.

One of the keys to the play was the Dolphins left guard Ted Larsen diligently following the play 40 yards downfield and springing a vicious block on the Patriots' Patrick Chung, who otherwise might have tackled Drake. After that, Rob Gronkowski was out of position to make the tackle as Drake flew by him to score.

== Game box score ==
Week Fourteen: New England Patriots at Miami Dolphins – Game summary

Quarter	1	2	3	4	Total
Patriots	6	21	0	6	33
Dolphins	7	14	7	6	34

at Hard Rock Stadium, Miami Gardens, Florida

- Date: December 9
- Game time: 1:00 p.m. EST
- Game weather: 84 °F (29 °C), mostly cloudy
- Game attendance: 66,087
- Referee: Pete Morelli
- TV announcers (CBS): Ian Eagle, Dan Fouts and Evan Washburn
- Recap, Gamebook

Game information

First quarter

- NE – James Develin 2-yard run (Stephen Gostkowski missed PAT), 8:13. Patriots 6–0. Drive: 12 plays, 75 yards, 6:47.
- MIA – Kenny Stills 7-yard pass from Ryan Tannehill (Jason Sanders kick), 2:41. Dolphins 7–6. Drive: 5 plays, 75 yards, 2:41.

Second quarter

- NE – Julian Edelman 2-yard pass from Tom Brady (Stephen Gostkowski kick), 14:14. Patriots 13–7. Drive: 5 plays, 18 yards, 2:04.
- MIA – Brandon Bolden 54-yard run (Jason Sanders kick), 13:26. Dolphins 14–13. Drive: 2 plays, 75 yards, 0:48.
- NE – Cordarrelle Patterson 37-yard pass from Tom Brady (Stephen Gostkowski kick), 10:32. Patriots 20–14. Drive: 6 plays, 75 yards, 2:54.
- MIA – Brandon Bolden 6-yard run (Jason Sanders kick), 7:28. Dolphins 21–20. Drive: 6 plays, 75 yards, 3:04.
- NE – Rob Gronkowski 16-yard pass from Tom Brady, 3:49. Patriots 27–21. Drive: 8 plays, 75 yards, 3:39.

Third quarter

- MIA – Brice Butler 23-yard pass from Ryan Tannehill (Jason Sanders kick), 3:58. Dolphins 28–27. Drive: 4 plays, 68 yards, 2:23.

Fourth quarter

- NE – Stephen Gostkowski 32-yard field goal, 6:50. Patriots 30–28. Drive: 8 plays, 55 yards, 3:43.
- NE – Stephen Gostkowski 22-yard field goal, 0:21. Patriots 33–28. Drive: 10 plays, 69 yards, 4:10.
- MIA – Kenyan Drake 69-yard pass from Ryan Tannehill. Dolphins 34–33. Drive: 1 play, 69 yards, 0:16.

Top passers

- NE – Tom Brady – 27/43, 358 yards, 3 TD
- MIA – Ryan Tannehill – 14/19, 265 yards, 3 TD

Top rushers

- NE – Sony Michel – 20 carries, 57 yards
- MIA – Frank Gore – 12 carries, 92 yards

Top receivers

- NE – Rob Gronkowski – 8 receptions, 107 yards, TD
- MIA – Kenny Stills – 8 receptions, 135 yards, TD

== Broadcaster calls ==
- Commentators Ian Eagle and Dan Fouts called the game for CBS's NFL coverage. Eagle and Fouts also called the near miracle in Pittsburgh against Miami five years earlier, when the Steelers tried a similar play and appeared to have pulled it off, except for Antonio Brown stepping out of bounds at the thirteen.

Eagle's call of the play:

Seven seconds left. Tannehill will throw it... and this will end it after the shovel. Or will it? Miami running around. Circling. Oh look out! Gronkowski! Didn't have the angle! Touchdown! Oh ho Kenyan Drake! A miracle! [pause] Miraculous in Miami! Stills... to Parker, to Drake! A lateral... heard 'round the world!

- Dolphins radio announcers Jimmy Cefalo, Bob Griese, and Joe Rose:

Tannehill. Last shot. Back to throw. They throw it down, they try to pitch it, and they do. To Parker, Parker pitches it, and it's Drake. DRAKE! 30, 20, GRONKOWSKI'S GONNA TACKLE! OH! THAT'S IT! HE GOES INTO THE END ZONE! TOUCHDOWN! UNBELIEVABLE! ARE YOU KIDDING ME? THAT IS UNBELIEVABLE! I DON'T BELIEVE WHAT I JUST SAW! There are no flags and the game is over!

- Patriots radio announcers Bob Socci and Scott Zolak:

Tannehill throws down the middle caught by Stills, laterals, back to Butler. (sic) Or rather Parker, who flips it to Drake, he runs across the 40 of New England, angling inside to the 30, 25, 20, 15, 10, He's gonna win the footrace to the end zone! The Dolphins are going to win it! On the lateral! Once then twice! And Drake takes it in! And the Patriots stand stunned in disbelief!

== Reactions ==
Patriots head coach Bill Belichick was criticized after the game for substituting out safety Devin McCourty for tight end Rob Gronkowski, who missed the final tackle leading to Drake's touchdown. Retired Patriots players Rodney Harrison and Tedy Bruschi argued that it was a situational mistake to substitute Rob Gronkowski at safety, given that the Dolphins were too far from the end zone to attempt a conventional Hail Mary. While Gronkowski’s size could have been useful against such a play, his lack of speed and weaker tackling ability compared to a typical free safety proved disastrous in defending the Dolphins’ laterals. Both Devin McCourty—who was subbed out for Gronkowski—and fellow safety Duron Harmon noted after the game that they expected a lateral play, not a Hail Mary, based on the Dolphins’ field position.

The press conference following this game is where the well-known "Nobody died" comment from Belichick hails from. Following the game he replied to questioning from reporters by saying, "Look it's the National Football League. Nobody died. Got a big game against Pittsburgh this week."

== Aftermath ==
The Dolphins improved to 7–6 with the victory and remained in contention for a postseason berth and an AFC East title. For the Patriots, the loss prevented them from clinching the AFC East, although they maintained their division lead.

The play proved inconsequential to the season as the Dolphins lost all of their remaining games to finish 7–9 and miss the playoffs for a second consecutive year. The Patriots clinched the division for a 10th consecutive year and a first-round bye with a 11–5 record and although the defeat cost them the home-field advantage throughout the AFC playoffs as the No. 1 seed, their season ultimately concluded with a 13–3 victory over the Los Angeles Rams in Super Bowl LIII. After the Super Bowl, Patriots quarterback Tom Brady said he didn't consider the Miami game a loss.

The game was also the final victory with the Dolphins for head coach Adam Gase, who was fired after the season, and quarterback Ryan Tannehill, who was traded to the Tennessee Titans. Gase was succeeded by Patriots assistant coach Brian Flores, the team's defensive playcaller in 2018. In their final game of following season, Flores led the Dolphins to an upset victory over New England, which dropped the Patriots to the conference's third seed and forced them to play the Titans in the wild card round. Tannehill went on to help Tennessee defeat the Patriots in Brady's final game with the team.

Four years later on December 18, 2022, the Patriots attempted a lateral pass play of their own against the Las Vegas Raiders with the game tied, but the attempt notably failed and resulted in the opposite intended effect: a walk-off game-winning touchdown for the Raiders, as Las Vegas defensive end (and former Patriot) Chandler Jones picked off New England's second lateral pass attempt and ran it in for the score. The Patriots were later criticized for the play, with some analysts such as Charles Curtis of USA Today Sports comparing it to the Butt Fumble, Colts Catastrophe, and other inept plays in NFL history.

== Officials ==
- Referee: Pete Morelli (#135)
- Umpire: Steve Woods (#54)
- Down Judge: Steve Stelljes (#22)
- Line Judge: Jeff Seeman (#45)
- Back Judge: Keith Ferguson (#61)
- Side Judge: Boris Cheek (#41)
- Field Judge: Anthony Jeffries (#36)
- Replay Official: Brian Matoren

== See also ==
- Dolphins–Patriots rivalry
- Hook and lateral
- Lunatic Lateral
