= Talman (surname) =

Talman or Talmon is a surname. Notable people with the surname include:

- Howard Parker Talman (1893–1961), American football player and coach
- Jacob Talmon (1916–1980), Israeli historian
- Jeff Talman (born 1954), American artist
- John Talman (1677–1726), British art collector
- Moshe Talmon (born 1950), Israeli psychotherapist
- Shemaryahu Talmon (1920–2010), Israel sociologist
- Stefi Talman (born 1958), Swiss shoe designer
- Tim Talman (born 1965), American actor
- William Talman (actor) (1915–1968), American actor
- William Talman (architect) (1650–1719), British architect

== See also ==
- Tallman (surname)
