= Lunatic Lateral =

American football play between the New England Patriots and the Las Vegas Raiders

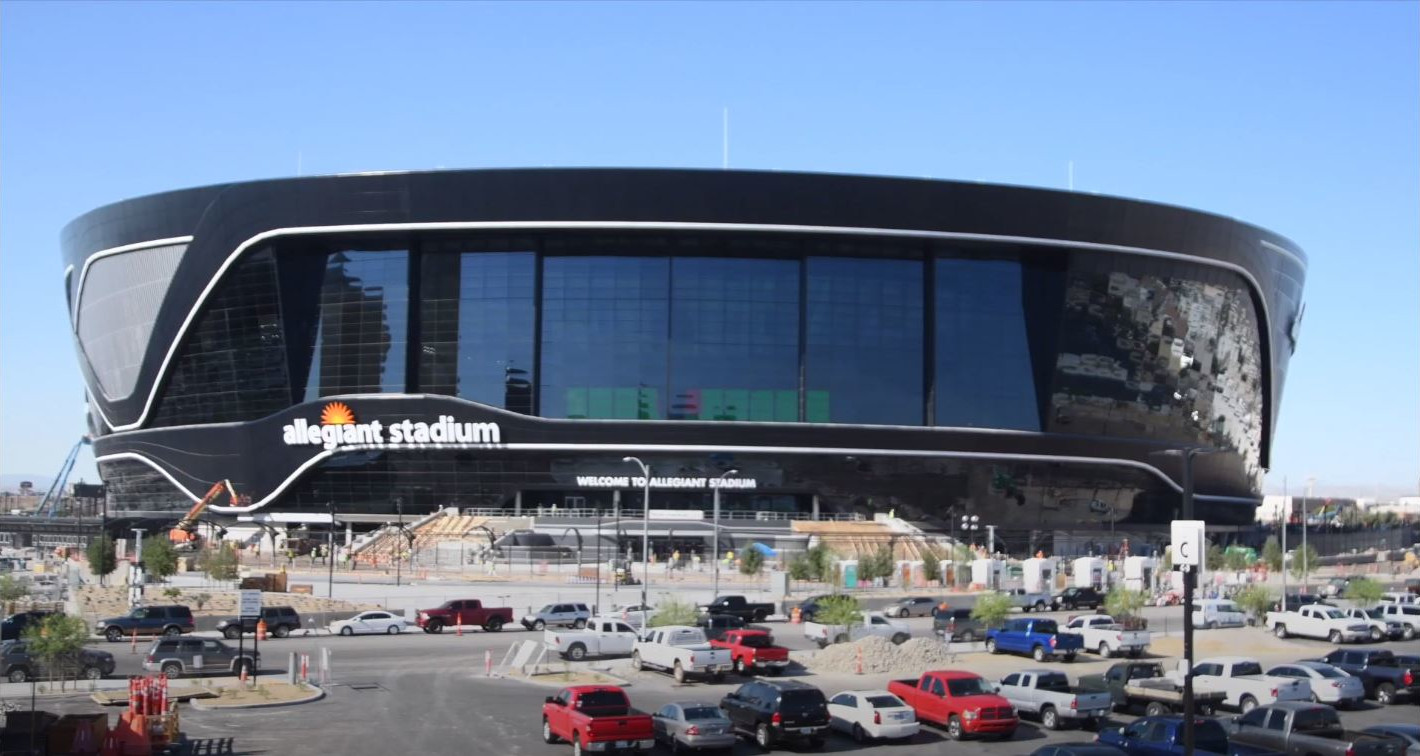
- Allegiant Stadium, the site of the game, in 2020
New England Patriots (7–6)	Las Vegas Raiders (5–8)
24	30
Head coach: Bill Belichick	Head coach: Josh McDaniels
	1	2	3	4	Total
NE	0	3	10	11	24
LV	3	14	0	13	30
- Date: December 18, 2022
- Stadium: Allegiant Stadium; Paradise, Nevada
- Favorite: Raiders by 1.5
- Referee: Ronald Torbert
- Attendance: 62,273

TV in the United States
- Network: Fox
- Announcers: Kenny Albert, Jonathan Vilma, and Shannon Spake

On December 18, 2022, the New England Patriots of the National Football League (NFL), who were playing the Las Vegas Raiders, attempted a lateral pass play at the end of regulation with the score tied at 24–24. However, the play failed as Raiders defender Chandler Jones intercepted the Patriots' second lateral pass and ran the ball in for a walk-off touchdown.

The play has been referred to as the Lunatic Lateral, the Las Vegas Lateral, Col-lateral Damage, the Hail Moron, the Vagary in Vegas, the Sin City Miracle, and the Flick Six by various media outlets. The play quickly became notable due to its unusual result and circumstances and having taken place just over four years after the Miracle in Miami, a successful lateral play (which the Patriots coincidentally also lost), though this play resulted in the opposite outcome. Several analysts criticized the team for attempting the play, which is normally attempted only when the team is trailing in the final seconds of a game and not with the game tied and have considered it one of the worst in NFL history. In addition, the blunder stood in stark contrast to the Patriots' success and disciplined play during the Brady–Belichick era, becoming emblematic of the team's struggles following quarterback Tom Brady's departure in 2020.

== Background ==
During the 2018 season, the Patriots had fallen victim to a successful lateral pass play by the Miami Dolphins, who scored a last-minute game-winning touchdown off the hook-and-ladder play to win in week 14 of that year. Despite that loss, New England eventually went on to win Super Bowl LIII, their sixth and final championship win during the Brady–Belichick era. This Patriots–Raiders game coincidentally occurred just over four years after the date of the Miracle in Miami. Additionally, this was the first time the Patriots played against the Raiders while their former long-time offensive coordinator Josh McDaniels was the Raiders' head coach.

== Game details ==
=== Lead up ===
The Raiders took a commanding 17–3 lead at halftime, but a pick-six thrown by Derek Carr to Patriots safety Kyle Dugger sparked 21 unanswered points by the Patriots, who capped off a 24–17 lead with a Rhamondre Stevenson touchdown run and a successful two-point conversion pass from Mac Jones to Jakobi Meyers. With only 32 seconds remaining, the Raiders tied the game with a Carr touchdown pass to Keelan Cole, which was arguably caught out of bounds as Cole's foot stepped on the outer boundary of the end zone but was ruled a touchdown.

The Patriots received the ensuing kickoff at their own 25-yard line with a touchback. They drove to their own 45-yard line before two incomplete passes set them up with a 3rd-and-10.

=== The play ===
With just three seconds left in regulation and the score tied 24–24, Jones took the snap and handed the ball off to Stevenson on a draw play with the Raiders playing in prevent defense, presumably to run the clock out and send the game to overtime. Stevenson eluded several Raiders defenders and ran the ball 23 yards towards the right sideline to the Las Vegas 32-yard line. With Raiders safety Duron Harmon closing in, Stevenson pitched the ball a short distance over his shoulder to Meyers, who ran back to the 40-yard line before throwing the ball towards the middle of the field and roughly 12 yards backwards towards Mac Jones's vicinity, unaware that Raiders defensive end Chandler Jones, who had earlier missed a tackle on Stevenson during the play, was guarding him. Jones then intercepted the ball and stiff-armed Mac Jones to the ground before running the ball back 48 yards for the improbable game-winning touchdown.

Chandler Jones, who had played for the Patriots from 2012 to 2015, was credited with a fumble recovery due to the backwards motion of the ball. He later described to Peter King of NBC Sports:

Instead of pursuing the ball, I just started playing back into saying, alright who's the next passer? Who could they possibly throw it to next that's behind the line of scrimmage? Because they're playing this whole hot potato game. Sure enough, I saw Jakobi Meyers kinda look back at Mac Jones, the quarterback. He was standing in the middle of the field. I literally just jumped up when I saw the ball coming, intended for Mac. Mac was kind of standing there, looking at me with big eyes. I literally just jumped up and intercepted it. I just gave Mac a nice stiff arm with my right hand. The rest was history.

— Chandler Jones on his role in the play

=== Box score ===
Week 15: New England Patriots at Las Vegas Raiders – Game summary

Quarter	1	2	3	4	Total
Patriots	0	3	10	11	24
Raiders	3	14	0	13	30

at Allegiant Stadium, Paradise, Nevada

- Date: December 18, 2022
- Game time: 4:05 p.m. EST/1:05 p.m. PST
- Game weather: None (indoor stadium)
- Game attendance: 62,273
- Referee: Ronald Torbert
- TV announcers (Fox): Kenny Albert, Jonathan Vilma and Shannon Spake
- Recap, Game Book

Game information

First quarter

- LV – Daniel Carlson 49-yard field goal, 8:26. Raiders 3–0. Drive: 12 plays, 42 yards, 6:34.

Second quarter

- NE – Nick Folk 24-yard field goal, 11:51. Tied 3–3. Drive: 14 play, 82 yards, 7:19.
- LV – Darren Waller 25-yard pass from Derek Carr (Daniel Carlson kick), 5:18. Raiders 10–3. Drive: 11 plays, 76 yards, 6:33.
- LV – Mack Hollins 5-yard pass from Derek Carr (Daniel Carlson kick), 0:04. Raiders 17–3. Drive: 2 plays, 20 yards, 0:23.

Third quarter

- NE – Kyle Dugger 16-yard interception return (Nick Folk kick), 12:07. Raiders 17–10.
- NE – Nick Folk 47-yard field goal, 1:21. Raiders 17–13. Drive: 12 play, 69 yards, 6:33.

Fourth quarter

- NE – Nick Folk 54-yard field goal, 12:52. Raiders 17–16. Drive: 7 play, 15 yards, 1:57.
- NE – Rhamondre Stevenson 34-yard run (Mac Jones pass to Jakobi Meyers), 3:43. Patriots 24–17. Drive: 3 play, 76 yards, 1:27.
- LV – Keelan Cole 30-yard pass from Derek Carr (Daniel Carlson kick), 0:32. Tied 24–24. Drive: 9 plays, 81 yards, 1:39.
- LV – Chandler Jones 48-yard fumble return, 0:00. Raiders 30–24.

Top passers

- NE – Mac Jones – 13/31, 112 yards
- LV – Derek Carr – 20/38, 231 yards, 3 TD, INT

Top rushers

- NE – Rhamondre Stevenson – 19 rushes, 172 yards, TD
- LV – Josh Jacobs – 22 rushes, 93 yards

Top receivers

- NE – Jakobi Meyers – 2 receptions, 47 yards
- LV – Keelan Cole – 2 receptions, 50 yards, TD

== Officials ==
- Referee: Ronald Torbert (#62)
- Umpire: Mark Pellis (#131)
- Down Judge: Max Causey (#84)
- Line Judge: Tim Podraza (#47)
- Field Judge: Ryan Dickson (#25)
- Side Judge: Keith Washington (#7)
- Back Judge: Tony Josselyn (#67)
- Replay Official: Denise Crudup

== Reactions ==
=== Broadcast calls of the play ===
==== TV (Fox) ====
Kenny Albert: Mack Hollins out on defense, he's all the way back... as Stevenson...

Jonathan Vilma: Is anyone gonna tackle him?
Albert:... is inside the 30, flips it back. Stanford Band nowhere in sight!
Vilma: Uh oh!
Albert: IT'S PICKED OFF!
Vilma: Uh-oh... Oh no!
Albert: UNBELIEVABLE!
Vilma: OH WOW!
Albert: INCREDIBLE! Chandler Jones takes it in... and wins the game for the Raiders! [pause] Have you ever seen an ending like that one?!
Vilma: [chuckling] I have never seen anything like that! I have no idea why he was doing that. Oh my goodness!

— Fox Sports' Kenny Albert and Jonathan Vilma calling the Lunatic Lateral

==== Radio (Patriots) ====
Bob Socci: Now on a third-and-ten, three seconds left. [Mac] Jones will give it to Stevenson, he started running, runs it up the middle, hit by Chandler Jones, slips, at about the 45, with a stiff-arm... off a tackle at the 40... he lost the football! And Jakobi Meyers picks it up! He circles back and he throws it across the field towards Mac Jones...

Scott Zolak: Oh my God.
Socci: It's picked up by Chandler Jones! HE BREAKS AWAY TO THE 30! HE RUNS TO THE 20! HE RUNS TO THE 10! And he RUNS TO THE END ZONE! [pause] Un... REAL! Touchdown... Raiders!
Zolak: Good night. This might be one of the dumbest teams I've ever seen.
Socci: And a victory for Las Vegas!

— WBZ-FM's Bob Socci and Scott Zolak calling the Lunatic Lateral

==== Radio (Raiders) ====
Jason Horowitz: Mac Jones hands it off on a draw to Rhamondre Stevenson. Breaks out of a tackle at the 50... has the 45, breaks away from another tackle, pitches it backwards. And now Jakobi Meyers spinning around… he throws it… TO CHANDLER JONES AT MIDFIELD!… AND A STIFF ARM!… CHANDLER JONES RACING TOWARDS THE END ZONE!… AND SCOOOOORES! OH MY GOODNESS! OH MY GOODNESS!

Lincoln Kennedy: I CAN’T BELIEVE WHAT I JUST SAW!
Horowitz: AGAIN!
Kennedy: I CAN’T BELIEVE WHAT I JUST SAW! THIS IS UNBELIEVABLE!… WOW!
Horowitz: ON THE FIRST NIGHT OF HANUKKAH, IT'S A MIRACLE IN LAS VEGAS!

— Compass Media Network's Jason Horowitz and Lincoln Kennedy calling the Lunatic Lateral

=== Players and coaches ===
Following the game, several Patriots players and head coach Bill Belichick took responsibility for the botched lateral play. Stevenson regretted pitching the ball to Meyers instead of simply running out of bounds and sending the game to overtime, saying that he should have "known the situation," and Meyers stated "I was trying to do too much…Trying to be a hero, I guess". He also stated that the team did not intend to execute a lateral pass during that final play. Mac Jones stated that he should have made the tackle on Chandler Jones, and Belichick stated that the Patriots made a "mistake" and "needed to be better in situational football." When asked why the Patriots did not attempt a Hail Mary pass, Belichick offered "Taking a shot at the end zone? We couldn't throw it that far," in reference to the nearly 60-yard distance required for the touchdown.

Former Patriots Tom Brady and Julian Edelman offered their opinions on the lateral play, as both were on the team during the Miracle in Miami. Brady specifically mentioned his experience of being at the losing end of the Miracle in Miami and relayed his reaction to watching the "Lunatic Lateral" on game highlight videos but also expressed faith in Belichick in rallying the Patriots after the botched play. Edelman suggested that Mac Jones should have tripped Chandler Jones to avoid the humiliation of being stiff-armed to the ground and being scored on, though that would have resulted in a 15-yard penalty for New England and nonetheless given the Raiders the chance to win with a field goal attempt.

During that week's Monday Night Football game between the Green Bay Packers and the Los Angeles Rams, Packers cornerback Rasul Douglas, who likewise lateralled the ball after making an interception in the game, stated his regret for doing so as the lateral pass was nearly recovered by Los Angeles but was picked up by his teammate Adrian Amos. Douglas stated "As I was going down, I underhanded it and then I seen it hit the ground. And I was like, 'Damn, this is about to be like the Raiders and Patriots'", also mentioning that his teammates "gave him a hard time" him for his lateral pass. NBC Sports Boston mentioned of the Patriots' lateral and how it related to Douglas' play and comments: "Simply put, the Patriots' loss was one of the most embarrassing of the Bill Belichick era and will be used as an example of what not to do for years to come."

=== Media ===
The day after the game, ESPN's Stephen A. Smith called the lateral play, especially Meyers' pass, the "dumbest play ever in NFL history", also opining that Stevenson, who had a strong game, did not need to pitch it to Meyers in the first place, especially as the game was tied. Although he applauded Meyers taking full responsibility for the play, Smith also remarked that Meyers' name would be "written all over" the now-infamous play, calling it "dumber" than the Butt Fumble. Similar sentiment was given by NFL Network's Rich Eisen, who dubbed the play the "Hail Moron" in reference to a Hail Mary pass and what he called the most "situationally boneheaded play... maybe ever" in contrast to the Patriots' usually disciplined play under Belichick. Charles Curtis of USA Today Sports countered that the Butt Fumble was a "delightful accident" compared to Meyers' lateral, but went on to compare the latter to the Colts Catastrophe, Leon Lett's Thanksgiving blunder, Dan Orlovsky's self-inflicted safety, and other inept plays in NFL history, saying the lateral belonged on the "Mount Rushmore of boneheaded plays". Richie Whitt of Sports Illustrated, writing for the publication's Pats Country blog on Fan Nation and having coined the "Lunatic Lateral" moniker, mentioned that there were multiple culprits in the failed play and declined to pin it all on Meyers, but also blamed Belichick for needing to be better at "situational coaching", in reference to his earlier quote about "situational football" and not trusting Mac Jones to throw a potential Hail Mary pass.

=== Fans ===
Within moments of the play, fan reactions were all over social media. One Patriots fan in particular, who was at Allegiant Stadium when the play happened, was constantly heckled by a Raiders fan during the game and especially during the play, with video from another spectator recording the incident, but the Patriots fan, who later self-identified as Jerry Edmond after numerous Twitter users expressed sympathy in response to the video, remained calm and did not retaliate against the unnamed woman. After viewing the video of Edmond, which was viewed 17.8 million times, Patriots owner Robert Kraft commended Edmond for his composure and personally called him, giving him free tickets to the Patriots' home game against the Cincinnati Bengals the following week, which Edmond accepted, watching the game from the press box with Kraft. Raiders president Sandra Douglass Morgan also praised Edmond for his composure, tweeting "On behalf of the Raiders, we appreciate the way you conducted yourself. No fan should have to endure that type of behavior. We will be in touch."

== Aftermath ==
With the game-winning touchdown, the Raiders defeated the Patriots for the first time since 2002, when they were still based in Oakland, California. They kept their faint playoff hopes alive while improving to 6–8. Meanwhile, the loss dropped New England to 7–7, dropping the team one spot out of playoff seeding and hurting their overall postseason chances. Both the Patriots and Raiders wound up missing the postseason, but the lateral play and resulting loss to Las Vegas was cited as a key factor in why the Patriots missed out, along with several other close losses throughout the season.

During the final play of the 2023 ReliaQuest Bowl between Illinois and Mississippi State, Illinois attempted a last-ditch lateral pass play to try to win the game, but one of the laterals hit the ground and a Mississippi state player recovered the ball and ran it in for a game-sealing touchdown to win 19–10. One source compared this particular play to the Lunatic Lateral, calling it "Raiders-esque".

On March 16, 2023, Jakobi Meyers signed a three-year contract with the Las Vegas Raiders. In his introductory press conference with the Raiders, Meyers was asked about the lateral pass as it had helped his new team win at the expense of his old team. Meyers quipped to the reporter, "I was waiting on this. Thank you, I appreciate you!" before describing the botched play as a "humbling experience".

Chandler Jones, who had scored the touchdown on this play, was excused from the Raiders early in the 2023 season due to several mental health incidents and was later released by the team following a string of arrests. Meanwhile, Belichick and the Patriots mutually parted ways following a 4–13 finish to the 2023 season, ending one of the greatest coaching tenures in NFL history in which the Patriots won six Super Bowls over 24 years, though the Patriots went 29–38 with just one playoff appearance in Belichick's final four years without Tom Brady. Adding in the results of the last three games of the 2022 season, the team went 9–28 following the Lunatic Lateral (including going 4-13 in Jerod Mayo's only year as head coach in 2024) until Mike Vrabel was hired as head coach in 2025, after which the Patriots immediately rebounded to a 14-3 record and a berth in Super Bowl LX. Raiders head coach Josh McDaniels, who had twice served as the Patriots' offensive coordinator before joining Las Vegas in 2022, returned to the Patriots as offensive coordinator in 2025.

== See also ==
- Lateral pass
- Miracle in Miami
- River City Relay
- Butt Fumble
- Colts Catastrophe
- List of nicknamed NFL games and plays
