= Dolman (disambiguation) =

Dolman is a garment.

Dolman may also refer to:

- Bob Dolman (born 1949), Canadian screenwriter, actor, director and producer
- Charles Dolman (1807–1863), British publisher
- Claude Ernest Dolman (1906–1994), Canadian academic and microbiologist
- Dick Dolman (1935–2019), Dutch politician
- Eric Dolman (1903–1969), Welsh cricketer
- Evert Dolman (1946–1993), Dutch racing cyclist
- Fiona Dolman (born 1970), Scottish actress
- Harry Dolman (1897–1977), British businessman
- John Dolman (died 1526), English clergyman
- John Dolman (Jesuit)
- Liam Dolman (born 1987), English footballer
- Malcolm Dolman (born 1960), Australian cricketer
- Nancy Dolman (1951–2010), Canadian actress and singer
- Thomas Dolman (1622–1697)
- William Dolman (coroner)

== See also ==
- Dolmen, a type of stone tomb
- Dollman (disambiguation)
- Stanford Dolman Travel Book of the Year
