= Talman =

Talman may refer to:

- Ibanez Talman, an electric guitar
- Talman (surname), a surname
- Talman Gardner (born 1980), American football player
- The Speaker of the Parliament of Sweden (the Riksdag)

== See also ==
- Tallman (disambiguation)
- Thalman
