= The Tall Man =

The Tall Man may refer to:

- The Tall Man: Death and Life on Palm Island a 2008 non-fiction book by Chloe Hooper
- The Tall Man (2011 film), a 2011 Australian documentary based on Chloe Hooper's book, directed by Tony Krawitz
- The Tall Man (2012 film), a 2012 film directed by Pascal Laugier
- The Tall Man (TV series), a 1960s Western television series
- Tall Man (Phantasm), a fictional character in the Phantasm film series

== See also ==
- Tall Man (disambiguation)
- The Tall Men (disambiguation)
