= Doleman =

Doleman is a surname. Notable people with the surname include:

- Chris Doleman (1961–2020), American football player
- Guy Doleman (1923–1996), New Zealand actor
- James Doleman (born 1991), New Zealand rugby union referee

== See also ==
- Coleman (surname)
- Dolman (disambiguation)
