= Tallman =

Tallman may refer to:

- Tallman, New York, United States
- Tallman, Oregon, United States
- Tallman (surname), a surname

== See also ==
- Fountain-Tallman
- Lincoln-Tallman
- Tall Man (disambiguation)
- Tallman-Vanderbeck
- Talman (disambiguation)
