= Dahlmann =

Dahlmann is a surname. Notable people with the surname include:

- Annika Dahlmann (born 1964), former Swedish cross country skier
- Friedrich Christoph Dahlmann (1785–1860), German historian and politician
- Hagbarth Dahlmann (1901–1974), Danish field hockey player
- Hermann Dahlmann (1892–1978), influential German aviation administrator during the Third Reich
- Kurt Dahlmann (1918–2017), German pilot, attorney, journalist, newspaper editor and political activist
- Nicolas Dahlmann (1769–1807), French cavalry general of the Napoleonic wars
- Sandra Dahlmann (born 1968), German Olympic swimmer

== See also ==
- Dahlman (disambiguation)
