= 2003 New Orleans Saints season =

NFL team season

- Owner: Tom Benson
- General manager: Mickey Loomis
- Head coach: Jim Haslett
- Home stadium: Louisiana Superdome

Results
- Record: 8–8
- Division place: 2nd NFC South
- Playoffs: Did not qualify
- All-Pros: None
- Pro Bowlers: G LeCharles Bentley; RB Deuce McAllister

The 2003 season was the New Orleans Saints' 37th in the National Football League (NFL), their 28th playing home games at the Louisiana Superdome, and fourth under head coach Jim Haslett. They failed to improve on their 9–7 record from 2002 and finished with a record of 8–8.

This was the season of the River City Relay, a play that has gone down in NFL lore from a week 16 game against the Jacksonville Jaguars. The Saints were 7–7 and needed a victory to keep their postseason hopes alive. The Jaguars held a 20–13 lead with seven seconds left in regulation, and the Saints had possession on their own 25. In a scene evoking memories of The Play, Aaron Brooks passed to Donté Stallworth for 42 yards, Stallworth lateraled to Michael Lewis for 7 yards, Lewis lateraled to Deuce McAllister for 5 yards, and McAllister lateraled to Jerome Pathon for 21 yards and a touchdown. The score was 20–19, leaving only the extra point to force overtime. However, in an unlikely twist, John Carney, who in his career made 98.4% of extra points attempted and had not missed one in a full decade, inexplicably missed the kick wide right, causing the Saints to miss the playoffs for the third consecutive season and 10th time in the past 11.

== Offseason ==
=== NFL draft ===
2003 New Orleans Saints draft
Round	Pick	Player	Position	College	Notes
1	6	Johnathan Sullivan	Defensive tackle	Georgia	
2	37	Jon Stinchcomb *	Offensive tackle	Georgia	
3	86	Cie Grant	Linebacker	Ohio State	
4	102	Montrae Holland	Guard	Florida State	
5	155	Melvin Williams	Defensive end	Kansas State	
6	203	Kareem Kelly	Wide receiver	USC	
7	231	Talman Gardner	Wide receiver	Florida State	
Made roster * Made at least one Pro Bowl during career

== Personnel ==
=== Staff ===
2003 New Orleans Saints staff
Front office: Owner – Tom Benson; Executive vice president/general manager – Mickey Loomis; Senior football administrator – Russ Ball; Director of player personnel – Rick Mueller; College scouting coordinator – Rick Thompson; Head coaches: Head coach – Jim Haslett; Offensive coaches: Offensive coordinator – Mike McCarthy; Quarterbacks – Mike Sheppard; Running backs – Dave Atkins; Wide receivers – Hubbard Alexander; Assistant wide receivers – Danny Langsdorf; Tight ends – Bob Palcic; Offensive line – Jack Henry; Offensive assistant/quality control – John Misciagna	Defensive coaches: Defensive coordinator – Rick Venturi; Defensive line – Sam Clancy; Linebackers – Winston Moss; Secondary – Joe Baker; Secondary/cornerbacks – Greg Brown; Defensive assistant/quality control – Ty Knott; Defensive assistant/special projects – Joe Alley; Special teams coaches: Special teams – Al Everest; Strength and conditioning: Strength and conditioning – Rock Gullickson; Assistant strength and conditioning – Jerry Palmieri

=== Roster ===
2003 New Orleans Saints roster
Quarterbacks (QB): 4 Todd Bouman; 2 Aaron Brooks; 14 J. T. O'Sullivan; Running backs (RB): 25 Fred McAfee KR; 26 Deuce McAllister; 36 Lamar Smith; 44 Terrelle Smith FB; Wide receivers (WR): 88 Talman Gardner; 87 Joe Horn; 89 Derrick Lewis; 84 Michael Lewis KR/PR; 18 Phil McGeoghan; 80 Jerome Pathon; 83 Donté Stallworth KR/PR; Tight ends (TE): 81 Zach Hilton; 86 Walter Rasby; 48 David Sloan; 82 Boo Williams	Offensive linemen (OL): 62 Jerry Fontenot C; 72 Wayne Gandy T; 61 Montrae Holland G; 64 Kendyl Jacox G; 66 Victor Riley T; 78 Jon Stinchcomb T; 70 Terence Wagner C; Defensive linemen (DL): 99 Kenderick Allen DT; 92 Tony Bryant DE; 94 Charles Grant DE; 95 Howard Green DT; 93 Darren Howard DE; 90 Kenny Smith DT; 97 Johnathan Sullivan DT; 98 Willie Whitehead DE/DT; 96 Melvin Williams DE	Linebackers (LB): 50 James Allen OLB; 58 Cie Grant OLB; 52 Sedrick Hodge OLB; 53 Roger Knight OLB; 59 Derrick Rodgers OLB; 56 Orlando Ruff MLB; 54 Darrin Smith MLB/OLB; Defensive backs (DB): 33 Ashley Ambrose CB; 20 Jay Bellamy SS; 35 Fakhir Brown CB; 29 Keyuo Craver CB/KR; 37 Steve Gleason SS; 23 Victor Green FS; 28 Deveron Harper CB/S; 34 Tebucky Jones FS; 22 Fred Thomas CB; Special teams (ST): 17 Mitch Berger P; 3 John Carney K; 47 Kevin Houser LS	Practice squad: 60 Ben Archibald T; 31 Tavian Banks RB; 77 Shawn Draper T; 75 Josh Shaw DT; 24 Maurice Tucker CB; Reserve: 65 LeCharles Bentley G (IR); 21 Dale Carter CB (IR); 32 Ki-Jana Carter RB (IR); 85 Ernie Conwell TE (IR); 10 Kerwin Cook WR (NF-Inj.); 27 James Fenderson RB (IR); 71 Spencer Folau G (IR); 42 Spencer Frederick FB (IR); 40 Mel Mitchell S (IR); 63 Chad Setterstrom G (IR); -- Nate Turner WR (NF-Inj.); Rookies in italics 53 active, 11 reserve, 5 practice squad

== Regular season ==
=== Schedule ===
During the 2003 regular season, the Saints’ non-division opponents were primarily from the NFC East and AFC South, based on the NFLʼs schedule rotation. They also played the Seattle Seahawks and Chicago Bears based on the teams' 2002 divisional placement.

Week	Date	Opponent	Result	Record	Venue	Attendance
1	September 7	at Seattle Seahawks	L 10–27	0–1	Seahawks Stadium	52,250
2	September 14	Houston Texans	W 31–10	1–1	Louisiana Superdome	68,390
3	September 21	at Tennessee Titans	L 12–27	1–2	The Coliseum	68,809
4	September 28	Indianapolis Colts	L 21–55	1–3	Louisiana Superdome	70,020
5	October 5	at Carolina Panthers	L 13–19	1–4	Ericsson Stadium	72,496
6	October 12	Chicago Bears	W 20–13	2–4	Louisiana Superdome	68,390
7	October 19	at Atlanta Falcons	W 45–17	3–4	Georgia Dome	70,837
8	October 26	Carolina Panthers	L 20–23 (OT)	3–5	Louisiana Superdome	68,370
9	November 2	at Tampa Bay Buccaneers	W 17–14	4–5	Raymond James Stadium	65,524
10	Bye					
11	November 16	Atlanta Falcons	W 23–20 (OT)	5–5	Louisiana Superdome	68,432
12	November 23	at Philadelphia Eagles	L 20–33	5–6	Lincoln Financial Field	67,802
13	November 30	at Washington Redskins	W 24–20	6–6	FedExField	76,821
14	December 7	Tampa Bay Buccaneers	L 7–14	6–7	Louisiana Superdome	68,442
15	December 14	New York Giants	W 45–7	7–7	Louisiana Superdome	68,399
16	December 21	at Jacksonville Jaguars	L 19–20	7–8	Alltel Stadium	49,207
17	December 28	Dallas Cowboys	W 13–7	8–8	Louisiana Superdome	68,451

=== Standings ===
NFC South
	W	L	T	PCT	DIV	CONF	PF	PA	STK
^{(3)} Carolina Panthers	11	5	0	.688	5–1	9–3	325	304	W3
New Orleans Saints	8	8	0	.500	3–3	7–5	340	326	W1
Tampa Bay Buccaneers	7	9	0	.438	2–4	6–6	301	264	L2
Atlanta Falcons	5	11	0	.313	2–4	4–8	299	422	W2
