= Single-wing formation =

Football formation

A classic single-wing alignment, with the center (50) shotgun-snapping the ball either to the left halfback/"tailback" (40) or to the fullback (30). Quarterback (20) is called "blocking back" in this formation, right halfback (10) is the "wingback," frequently a pass receiver.

In American and Canadian football, a single-wing formation was a precursor to the modern shotgun formation. The term usually connotes formations in which the snap is tossed rather than handed. Formations with one wingback and a handed snap are commonly called "wing T" or "winged T".

Created by Glenn "Pop" Warner, the single wing was deemed superior to the T formation in its ability to get an extra eligible receiver downfield.

== History ==
There is no way to improve on football beyond the unbalanced line single-wing.

— Carl Snavely

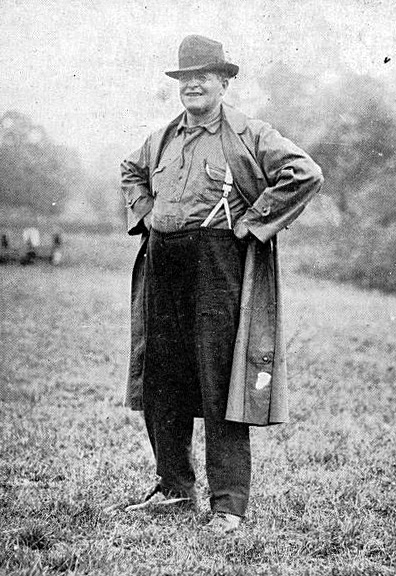
Pop Warner at the University of Pittsburgh in 1917

Among coaches, single-wing football denotes a formation using a long snap from center as well as a deceptive scheme that evolved from Glenn "Pop" Warner's offensive style. Traditionally, the single-wing was an offensive formation that featured a core of four backs including a tailback, a fullback, a quarterback (blocking back), and a wingback. Linemen were set "unbalanced", with two on one side of the center and four on the other. This was done by moving the off-side guard or tackle to the strong side. The single-wing was one of the first formations attempting to trick the defense instead of overpowering it.

Pop Warner referred to his new offensive scheme as the Carlisle formation because he formulated most of the offense while coaching the Carlisle Indians. The term single-wing came into widespread use after spectators noticed that the formation gave the appearance of a wing-shape. In 1907, Warner coached at Carlisle, a school for Native Americans, where his legacy consisted of at least three significant events. The first was the discovery of Jim Thorpe's raw athletic ability. The second was the use of an extensive passing game that relied on the spiraled ball. Finally, faking backs who started one way, but abruptly headed the opposite way, kept defenses guessing. Since Jim Thorpe had so much raw talent, Coach Warner more than likely designed much of his single-wing offense around this gifted athlete. Thorpe, the proverbial triple threat, was a good runner, passer, and punter.

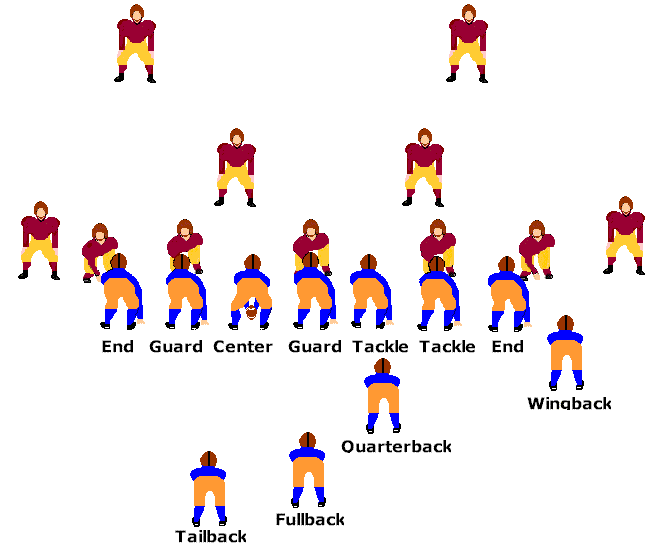
Single-wing formation similar to Pop Warner's playbook

For much of the history of the single-wing formation, players were expected to play on both sides of the ball. Consequently, offensive players often turned around to play a corresponding location on defense. The offensive backs played defensive backs, just as the offensive linemen played defensive linemen. Unlike teams of today, single-wing teams had few specialists who only played on certain downs.

College football playbooks before the 1950s were dominated with permutations of the traditional single-wing envisioned by Warner. Two-time All-American Jack Crain's handwritten playbook clearly denotes how the University of Texas ran their version of the single-wing circa 1939–1940. University of Texas Coach Dana X. Bible ran a balanced line, which meant that each side of the center had the same number of linemen. The ends were also slightly split.

Slightly splitting offensive ends, called flexing, was in widespread use by Notre Dame's Box variation of the single-wing. Knute Rockne's Notre Dame Box offense employed a balanced line, which had 3 linemen on each side of the center. Another Rockne innovation was a shifting backfield that attempted to confuse the defense by moving backs to alternate positions right before the snap. Another variation of the single-wing saw the quarterback move out as a wingback on the weak side. Besides adding different blocking angles for the quarterback, the double-wing formation facilitated the passing game. Stanford had a variation on the double-wing in which the quarterback stayed right behind the strong side guard, while the tailback became the wingback to the weak side. The fullback, being the only deep back left, took all the snaps and directed the plays.

The advent of the T formation in the 1940s led to a decline in the use of single-wing formations. For example, the single-wing coach Dana X. Bible, upon his retirement in 1946, saw his replacement, Blair Cherry, quickly install the T formation like many other college coaches of the day. Wallace Wade said he was "not convinced that the single wing is not a more potent formation than the T. The single wing we used caused the defense to spread. It called for more intensive coaching on individual assignments."

However, from 1949 to 1957, Henry "Red" Sanders elevated a rarely distinguished UCLA football program to an elite level with his precision single-wing system, winning a National Championship at UCLA in 1954.

The single-wing style of football is still practiced by a small group of teams across the country, almost exclusively at the high school and youth level. The Pittsburgh Steelers were the last NFL team to use the single-wing as their standard formation, finally switching to the T formation in 1952. In 2008, the Miami Dolphins utilized a version of the single-wing offense (calling it the "wildcat") against the New England Patriots on six plays, which produced four touchdowns in a 38–13 upset victory, and again two weeks later, defeating the San Diego Chargers. In college football, by the early 1960s, the only major teams still relying on the single wing were Tennessee, UCLA, University of Pennsylvania and Princeton. Following 1964, only Princeton, which had been particularly known for the single wing under its longtime coach Charlie Caldwell, still used the formation, finally giving it up in 1969 after the retirement of Caldwell's successor Dick Colman.

=== Sutherland single wing ===
The Sutherland single-wing was a variation used with great success by Coach Jock Sutherland of the 1930s and 1940s. Note that coach Sutherland mastered many forms of the single-wing, but the formation described here is the one he invented and was named after him.

The Sutherland single-wing differs from the traditional single-wing in that the wingback is brought into the backfield as a halfback, flanking the fullback on the other side from the tailback. This allows a more flexible running attack to the weak-side. Both the tailback and halfback are triple threats in this offense. The weakness of this formation is less power than the traditional single-wing and it requires very talented backs to play tailback and halfback effectively.

Sutherland created this formation from the original single-wing he learned from legendary coach Pop Warner at the University of Pittsburgh in the 1910s. Sutherland became the Pitt coach in 1924, where he remained through 1938. Sutherland's Pitt teams were named "National Champions" by various selectors in nine different seasons, including five recognized by the university. Sutherland was the avowed master of the single-wing offense while at Pitt. Sutherland brought his coaching skills to the NFL in 1940 as the coach of the Brooklyn Dodgers. At Brooklyn, he took over a team that had never finished better than second and had only one winning season since 1930. He implemented his offensive ideas and the Dodgers finished with a record of 8–3 and finished only a game behind the Washington Redskins. Sutherland's star was Ace Parker, who played tailback and was NFL MVP. The Dodgers also finished second in 1941, with a 7–4 mark. Later, Sutherland coached the Pittsburgh Steelers in 1946 and 1947. In 1947, Sutherland and his single-wing pushed the Steelers to their first playoff appearance, for the East Conference crown. They were soundly defeated by Greasy Neale's Philadelphia Eagles, running the T-formation, 21–0. Sutherland died suddenly in 1948, but the Steelers continued to use his single-wing until 1953, when they were the last NFL team to switch to the T. Runningback Austin Horton also rushed for 1,245 yards during the Sutherland season.

=== Double wing ===
The double-wing is an offensive formation which should not be confused with the Double Wing offense. The double-wing formation is used in many offenses from the youth level through college. The formation was first introduced by Pop Warner around 1912. Just a few offenses that use the formation are the double wing, flexbone and wing T offenses. It was the primary formation used by Ara Parseghian when he ran the wing T at Notre Dame, winning National Championships in 1966 and 1973.

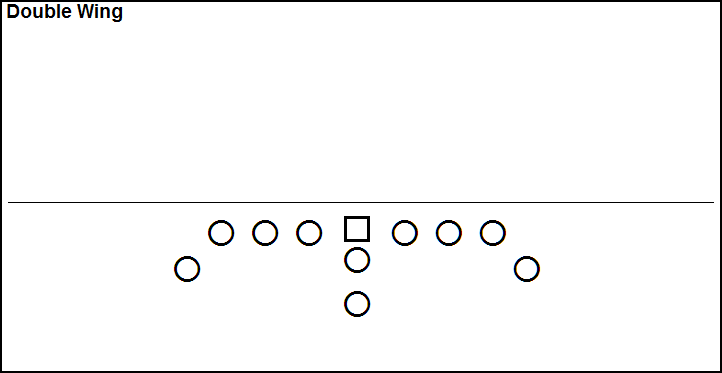
Double Wing Formation

The formation is not necessarily the same in all offenses and is a broad term to describe any offense with two wingbacks. In the wing T, the double-wing formation is used to refer to Red, Blue and Loose Red formations.

The double-wing formation in American football usually includes one wide receiver, two wingbacks, one fullback, and one tight end.

== Single-wing style of play ==
The direct snap or toss from the center usually went to the tailback or fullback. However, the quarterback could also take the ball. The tailback was very important to the success of the offense because he had to run, pass, block, and even punt. Unlike today, the quarterback usually blocked at the point of attack. As with his modern-day counterpart, a single-wing quarterback might also act as a field general by calling plays. The fullback was chosen for his larger size so that he could "buck" the line. This meant that the fullback would block or carry the ball between the defensive tackles. The wingback could double-team block with an offensive lineman at scrimmage or even run a pass route.

The single-wing formation was designed to place double-team blocks at the point of attack. Gaining this extra blocker was achieved in several ways. First, the unbalanced line placed an extra guard or tackle on one side of the center. Second, a wingback stationed outside end could quickly move to a crucial blocking position. Third, the fullback and especially the quarterback could lead the ball carrier producing interference. Finally, linemen, usually guards, would pull at the snap and block at the specified hole. Line splits were always close except for ends that might move out from the tackle.

The single-wing formation depended on a center who was skilled both at blocking and at tossing the ball from between his legs to the receiving back. The center had to direct the ball to any of several moving backs, with extreme accuracy, as the play started. Single-wing plays would not work well if the back had to wait for the snap because quick defensive penetration would overrun the play. The center was taught to direct the ball to give the tailback or fullback receiver a running start in the direction that the play was designed to go. The single-wing formation was a deceptive formation with spectators, referees, and defensive players often losing sight of the ball. A backfield player, called a "spinner", might turn 360 degrees while faking the ball to the other backs, or even keeping the ball or passing it. Defensive players were often fooled as to which back was carrying the ball.

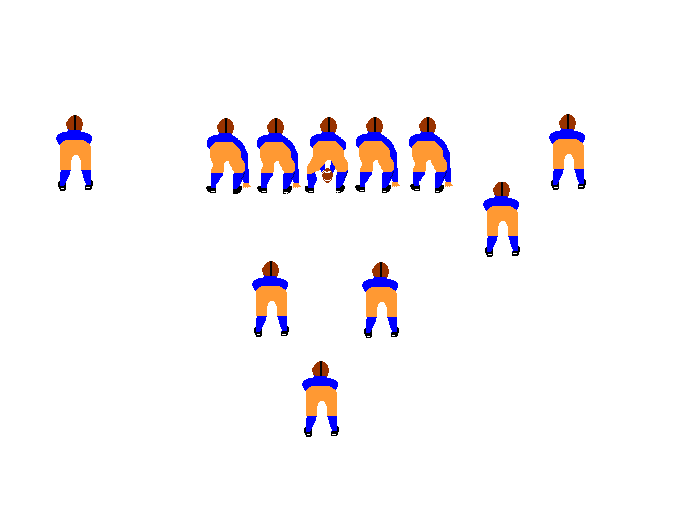
Single-wing punt formation similar to Pop Warner's playbook

The one play that was unique to the single-wing formation was the buck-lateral series. The terminology for this series of plays associates the word "buck" with the intent of the fullback to plunge into the line. In addition, the short toss, or lateral of the ball, can be made to the quarterback or wingback who may take the ball and do other maneuvers including passing the ball. Consequently, when the fullback takes the ball, he appears to be headed to buck the line. Typically, fullbacks were larger players that ran plays intended to smash the defensive front. The fullback's initial move pulls the defensive players toward the expected point of attack. Next, the fullback tosses the ball to another back causing the defense to change pursuit angles, thus losing a step in their catching the ball carrier. The strong side of the formation, where the extra lineman and wingback lined up, put pressure on the defensive end. Defenses might move extra players to that side or shift the whole defense to compensate. The cut-back play could succeed regardless of how the defense reacted. The cut-back play started like a strong side sweep with offensive guards and quarterback running interference for the tailback. The fullback would fake a smash over the guard hole to occupy the defensive tackles. The play was designed to make the defensive end overreact and try to stay outside to contain the runner. If the defensive end gave ground to the sideline, the tailback would cut-back inside to let his interference push the defensive end out of the play. If the defensive end came too far inside, then the ball carrier would run around him to the outside. After the cut-back play was used in a game, then the offense might run the wingback reverse since both plays started out the same way. At the outset, the defense tries to pursue the sweeping tailback. However, the tailback delivers the ball to the wingback running the opposite way to the weak side. Both the cut-back and the reverse would be set up with quick fullback bucks up the middle, which would cause the defensive line to over-protect their gaps, as opposed to pursuing quickly to the sideline.

Single-wing teams used both a standard punting formation and a quick punt, often kicking on second or third downs. The quick punt, or quick kick, saw the tailback-punter swiftly backing up 5 yards as the ball was in the air from the center to distance himself from rushers. The strategy was to prevent defensive halfbacks, expecting a possession play, from dropping back to return the ball. The standard punt formation was often used for either punting as well as running or passing the ball. Most teams had a litany of plays that they might run from a punt formation.

The single-wing melon-shaped ball measures from 28 to 22 in (710 to 560 mm) in circumference, while the modern ball measures approximately 21 in (530 mm)

Prior to 1930, the shape of the football was a prominent oval shape called a prolate spheroid. Due to the shape of the ball, single-wing backs handled the ball more like a basketball, with short tosses and underhand lobs. Gradually, balls were allowed to be elongated enough to produce streamlined passes with a spiral. The spiraled ball could be thrown further with more accuracy, thus increasing the potential for offenses to use the forward pass more frequently.

The single-wing quarterback played a different role than modern-day quarterbacks. While the quarterback may have called the snap count due to his position close to the center of the formation, he may not have called the actual play in the huddle. For much of the history of football, coaches were not allowed to call plays from the sideline. This responsibility may have gone to the team captain. The quarterback was expected to be an excellent blocker at the point of attack. Some playbooks referred to this player as the blocking back. The quarterback also had to handle the ball by faking, handing off, or optioning to other backs.

== Modern use ==
Although the single-wing has lost much of its popularity since the 1950s, its characteristic features are still prevalent in all levels of modern football. They include pulling guards, double teams, play action passes, laterals, wedge blocking, trap blocking, the sweep, the reverse and the quick kick. Many current offenses, such as the spread option, use single-wing tendencies for running plays, while using wide receivers instead of wingbacks. Once a strong running formation, the single wing has been replaced by formations that facilitate passing, while minimizing the running aspect of the game. Today the single-wing has evolved into what coaches call the spread offense or shotgun, with the emphasis on passing. The most noticeable feature that remains of the powerful Carlisle formation is the long toss from center to the main ball-handler. The main talent and field general has become the quarterback instead of the tailback. The other single-wing backs have moved close to the line of scrimmage and are split further from the main line. Wide receivers are called split-ends, flex ends, slots, and flankers. Also, linemen spacing has increased in distance. Moving offensive players further apart serves the purpose of also spreading the defense. The goal is to make defenses cover the whole field on every play.

The current incarnation of the Wildcat offense, which has been adopted by many college, NFL, and high school teams, uses many elements of the single-wing formation.

=== Successful teams ===
The single-wing has had a successful revival in youth leagues, middle schools, high schools, and some colleges. Here are some examples of single-wing high school teams that have had success all across the country. In 2005, Virginia saw three teams ride the single-wing to the state playoffs. Two of the three teams, Giles High School and Osbourn High School, actually won their division. Giles High School returned to the state championship game in 2006, and also won state championships using the single wing in both 1980 and 2013. In 1998 and 1999, Park View High School in Sterling, Virginia advanced to consecutive state championships using the single wing offense. When Park View coach Mickey Thompson moved to nearby Stone Bridge High School in 2000, he took the single wing with him. As a result, the Bulldogs have won 12 District titles, 9 Region titles and won the 2007, 2020, and 2021 AAA Division 5 State title games. On February 1, 2010, Stone Bridge Offensive Coordinator Matt "Hate-Dog" Griffis was named Head Coach of nearby Broad Run High School. Griffis announced he will be running the Single Wing as well as his hybrid Single Wing formation dubbed the "Griff-Bone". Tower Hill School in Wilmington, Delaware perfected this formation which led to numerous state championships. Warren County High School in Front Royal, Va. also used the single-wing to moderate success. In Louisa County, Va., the local high school has had similar success by running the single-wing formation since 2003.

Colton California has been a consistently successful single-wing team by reaching the state playoffs on six consecutive seasons.

In 1998, The Menominee Maroons won the Michigan high school class BB football championship, and in 2006 and 2007 won the Michigan High School Class B football championship, winning 28 consecutive games over the last 2 years, and reaching the state playoffs for the last 11 years.

In 1971, the Corning High School Cardinals of Corning, California had a 9–0 undefeated season utilizing a balanced single-wing offense under coach Tag McFadden. They were the number one rated school Division 4 in the state and McFadden was garnered coach of year by Cal-Hi Sports.

In 1974 and 1975, St. Mark's School (MA) compiled a 13–1 record running the Princeton Single Wing.

In 1980, Coach Ted Hern brought the single-wing to Moriarty High School, the "Fighting" Pintos made three state championship appearances winning 2 state titles, one undefeated season and suffering only 3 losses in four seasons. Coach Frank Ortiz was an assistant coach in the later seasons.

Since 1985, Santa Rosa High School has used the single-wing formation under Coach Frank Ortiz. The Lions have made the playoffs every year except three, won their district title 17 times, won the New Mexico AA State Championships in 1955 (Under John Salvo) 1993, 1996, 1998, 2007 (Under Frank Ortiz), 2010, 2011,2012, (Under former SRHS Lion Mario Trujillo) and made a total of 17 State Finals appearances.

Xavier High School's (NYC) Head Coach Chris Stevens recently changed the team's offense to the single-wing. In 2007, they went 11–1, and averaged 39 points in the New York Catholic High School Football League A Division. They had two 1,000-yard rushers in Seamus Kelly and Jimmy Kowalski, while both also scored 17 TDs. In the championship game trailing by two scores with less than 8 minutes to play, Xavier scored 31 unanswered points to win their first championship in over 10 years. The following week they beat Fordham Prep 20–14 in the annual "Turkey Bowl", a game that dates back to the late 1800s. Running the single-wing since 2006, they have been at the top of league in rushing. In 2007, they were in the top three rushing and scoring schools in New York. They again won a championship in the New York Catholic High School Football League in 2012 this one coming in the AA division. They averaged 34 points a game scoring 35 or more points 9 times, rushed for 46 touchdowns and 3,700 yards with a 9–2 record.

In 2005, St. Mary's of Lynn in Massachusetts won the D4A Eastern Mass Title following two consecutive division titles with Ed Melanson running the Single Wing. Prior to Coach Melanson installing the Single Wing there in 2002, St. Mary's had not had a winning season since 1977.

In Kansas, Mark Bliss installed the Single Wing offense at Conway Springs High School in 1997, coaching the team to Kansas Class 3A state championships in 1998, 2001, 2002, and 2003. During his seven seasons at Conway Springs, his teams compiled a record of 81–4, including a 62-game winning streak. Conway Springs continues to run the Single Wing offense and added state titles in 2004, 2008, and again in 2011 and are perennial playoffs contenders under Coach Matt Biehler.

In Kansas, Ed Buller created a football dynasty centered around the Single Wing offense. In his 40 years of coaching, which ended in 1984, Buller's only losing season was his first. Buller compiled a record of 335–78–7 and coached the Clyde Bluejays to 10 undefeated seasons along with 39 consecutive winning seasons.

In Nebraska Dave Cisar's Screaming Eagle youth football teams have been running the Single Wing offense for 8 seasons. During that time period those teams have gone 78-5 and averaged over 35 points per contest and won two State Titles. He did this with 6 totally different teams in 4 different leagues in various age groups. His teams even used the famous "fullback full spinner series" along with the other traditional Single Wing plays. Coach Cisar published a book "Winning Youth Football a Step by Step Plan" in 2006 to help youth coaches install this "old school" offense.

In Connecticut, Anthony Sagnella runs the single wing with his North Haven High School Team that reached the 2015 Class L state Championship Game and were defeated by New Caanan, 42–35. Tailback Mike Montano was an All-State Selection as a RB with over 1800 Rushing yards and 30 TDs. More recently, Sagnella won back-to-back CIAC Class MM State Championships running the single wing in 2022 and 2023 with Adam Pandolfi at Taiback.

In Colorado, Brian Christensen's Akron Rams (Class 1A) high school football team has made running the Single Wing offense a local tradition. Akron won back-to-back undefeated state championships in 2001 and 2002. They also took home State titles in 2006, 2007, and 2008. Christensen's teams have made the playoffs every year since 1996 and have made it to at least the semi-finals of the state playoffs all but 4 times within that span. The Akron Rams are renowned for their "exceptional prowess executing the single-wing offense." One coach characterized Akron's single-wing attack as, "A Chinese fire-drill in the backfield every single play. You have to play mistake-free defense or Akron's single-wing attack will burn you." Christensen took over the Akron program in 1996, his overall record at Akron is: 163–31 (.841 winning percentage).

In Iowa, Bob Howard, the coach of the Sigourney-Keota Savage Cobras (2A), has led the Cobras to three state championships (1995, 2001, 2005), using the single-wing offense. He used the offense when he first started coaching at Sigourney in the 1970s, before Sigourney and Keota conjoined teams. In 2005 the vaulted Cobra single-wing offense set a new state record for points in a season with 696, 537 of which coming in the nine regular season games, and in 2007 the Cobras set a new state rushing record racking up 718 yards in a single game. Howard left Sigourney-Keota after the 2006 season to become the new head coach at Webster City High School and was charged with rebuilding a once-proud program that hadn't won over six games or made the Class 3A playoffs since 1996. Installing his vaunted single-wing offense, in 2007 the Lynx led District 2 in rushing by gaining over 2,200 yards on the ground despite their overall record of 3–6. However, in 2008, the Lynx not only made the playoffs for the first time in 12 years, but also finished the season with a final record of 7–4. Tailback John Hill rushed for 1,420 yards—the sixth highest total in school history.

On September 21, 2008, the Miami Dolphins used a version of the single-wing offense (specifically the Wildcat offense) against the New England Patriots on six plays, which produced five touchdowns (four rushing and one passing) in a 38–13 upset victory, after its successful adoption on the college and high school level by several teams.

The 1957 Cass Township, exclusively used single-wing offense. The Cass (Schuylkill County) PA Condors rolled through a season unbeaten, untied, and unscored upon over 50 years ago, going 9–0 in the regular season before defeating Shamokin, 2–0, in a special playoff for the Eastern Conference Southern Division title for a season of 10–0. They are the only high school football team in Pennsylvania that can lay claim to that feat. The late Coach Pat Droskinis, listed in the PA Sports Hall of Fame, coached them and led by a strong 4–5–2 defense that featured All-State ends in 6-foot-3 Russ Frantz and 6-2 Harry Butsko, the Cass Twp Condors blanked Minersville, Nescopeck, West Mahanoy Township, Schuylkill Haven, Ashland, Blythe Township, Mahanoy Township, Lansford and Saint Clair, and then Shamokin in the playoff game (2–0).

In Pittsburgh, Coach Pete Dimperio ran the single wing at Westinghouse High School from 1946 to this retirement in 1966. Westinghouse played in the City League championship game every one of those 21 years and they won 17 times. Coach Dimperio's league play record was a phenomenal 118–5–1 and (158–26–1 overall). His Bulldog teams ran the single-wing formation with mostly buck-lateral and fullback spinner plays. He did not use a multitude of plays, rather he won because his players were so well-schooled and disciplined they were all but unstoppable. When Coach Dimperio started at Westinghouse the student body was mostly the children of Italian immigrants, but by the late 1950s it was almost 100% African American. It didn't matter to Coach Dimperio; he and his single wing won nonetheless. Being from a relatively poor inner city school, Westinghouse usually had no assistant coaches and rarely suited up more than 40 players. Yet, in exhibition games against some of the biggest suburban schools, Westinghouse usually won. Once in an exhibition game against South Hills Catholic which suited up 90 players and had five coaches, Coach Dimperio's deceptive single wing made mincemeat of the heavier and slow opponent to the point where one of the South Hills Catholic coaches remarked, "they (the Westinghouse backs) ran down the field so many times it looked like track practice." Coach Dimperio was inducted into the Pennsylvania Sports Hall of Fame in 1964.

Keith W. Piper, head coach at Denison University (Ohio) had played center in the single wing in high school and at Baldwin-Wallace University, and he went against trends by using that offense for three seasons at Denison in the early 1960s. After the Big Red went 0–8–1 in 1977, he returned to the single wing for good because tailback Clay Sampson offered a dual threat. He became the only player in Division III history to rush for 3,000 yards and pass for 3,000 in a career when he totaled 6,920 yards for Denison from 1977 to '80. In 1985, Piper's single wing offense featured a potent mix of speed, athleticism and experience that produced an average victory margin of 29.6 points. That year Denison set nine school season team records—including most total yards of offense (4,330), most rushing yards (3,510) and most points (377)—and set five single game school marks.

== See also ==
- Glossary of American football
- Wingback
