= Jakobi Meyers =

American football player (born 1996)

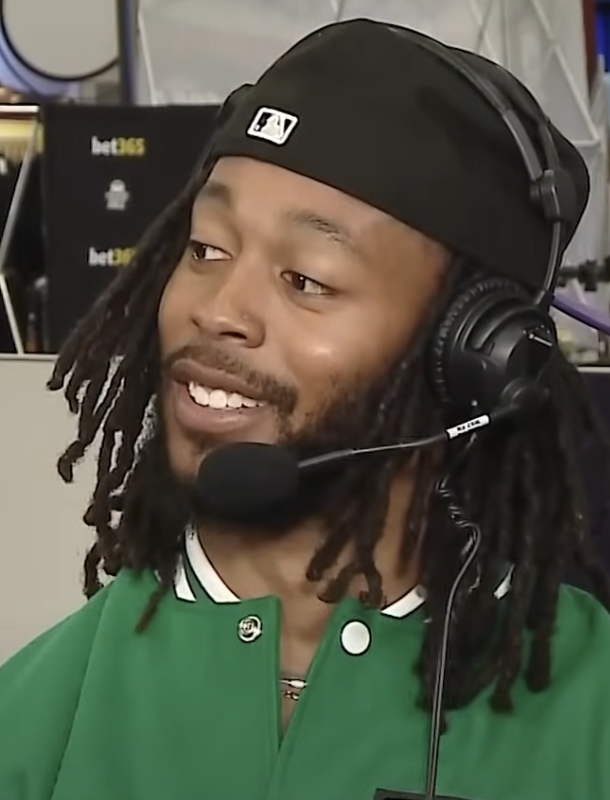
- Meyers in 2024

No. 3 – Jacksonville Jaguars
- Position: Wide receiver
- Roster status: Active

Personal information
- Born: November 9, 1996 (age 30); Lithonia, Georgia, U.S.
- Listed height: 6 ft 2 in (1.88 m)
- Listed weight: 200 lb (91 kg)

Career information
- High school: Arabia Mountain (Lithonia)
- College: NC State (2015–2018)
- NFL draft: 2019: undrafted

Career history
- New England Patriots (2019–2022); Las Vegas Raiders (2023–2025); Jacksonville Jaguars (2025–present)

Career NFL statistics as of Week 5, 2026
- Receptions: 483
- Receiving yards: 5,629
- Receiving touchdowns: 25
- Stats at Pro Football Reference

Jakobi Meyers (born November 9, 1996) is an American professional football wide receiver for the Jacksonville Jaguars of the National Football League (NFL). He played college football for the NC State Wolfpack and signed with the New England Patriots as an undrafted free agent in 2019.

== Early life ==
Meyers attended and played high school football at Arabia Mountain High School in Lithonia, Georgia.

== College career ==
Meyers played at NC State from 2015 to 2018. Initially recruited as a quarterback, Meyers transitioned to receiver following his freshman year in which he redshirted and was a key member of the scout team. In the 2017 season, Meyers had three games on the year going over 100 receiving yards: 112 against Florida State, 105 against Clemson, and 101 against North Carolina. In the 2018 season, he had five games going over the 100-yard mark: 161 against James Madison, 125 against Florida State, 117 against Wake Forest, 111 against North Carolina, and 163 against East Carolina. In the 2018 season, his 92 receptions ranked second and his 1,047 receiving yards ranked fourth in the ACC.

During his collegiate career, Meyers had 168 receptions for 1,932 yards and nine touchdowns. After his junior season, he entered the 2019 NFL draft. Meyers’ 92 receptions in 2018 broke Torry Holt's single season receptions record for NC State.

=== College statistics ===
| Season | Team | GP | Receiving | | | |
| Season | Team | GP | Rec | Yds | Avg | TD |
|---|---|---|---|---|---|---|
| 2015 | NC State | Redshirt | | | | |
| 2016 | NC State | 7 | 13 | 158 | 12.2 | 0 |
| 2017 | NC State | 12 | 63 | 727 | 11.5 | 5 |
| 2018 | NC State | 12 | 92 | 1,047 | 11.4 | 4 |
| Career | | 31 | 168 | 1,932 | 11.5 | 9 |

== Professional career ==
Pre-draft measurables
| Height | Weight | Arm length | Hand span | Wingspan | 40-yard dash | 10-yard split | 20-yard split | 20-yard shuttle | Three-cone drill | Vertical jump | Broad jump | Bench press |
|---|---|---|---|---|---|---|---|---|---|---|---|---|
| 6 ft 1 5/8 in (1.87 m) | 203 lb (92 kg) | 32 in (0.81 m) | 9 1/2 in (0.24 m) | 6 ft 4 1/2 in (1.94 m) | 4.63 s | 1.50 s | 2.66 s | 4.23 s | 6.87 s | 37.0 in (0.94 m) | 9 ft 10 in (3.00 m) | 13 reps |
All values from NFL Combine/Pro Day

=== New England Patriots ===
==== 2019 ====
Meyers signed with the New England Patriots as an undrafted free agent in 2019. He debuted in the Patriots' preseason opener against the Detroit Lions, recording a game-high six catches for 69 yards and two touchdowns in a Patriots 31–3 win. In the Patriot's second preseason game, against the Tennessee Titans, Meyers again had a game-high six catches for 82 yards; he also had a two-point conversion reception in the 22–17 win for New England. In Week 1, against the Pittsburgh Steelers, in his regular-season debut, Meyers had one reception for 22 yards in a 33–3 win. Overall, Meyers recorded 26 receptions for 359 receiving yards as a rookie.

==== 2020 ====
In Week 9 of the 2020 season, against the New York Jets on Monday Night Football, he recorded a career-high with 12 receptions for 169 yards, including a 20-yard catch to set up Nick Folk's game-winning 51-yard field goal as the Patriots won 30–27. In Week 10 against the Baltimore Ravens on NBC Sunday Night Football, Meyers led the Patriots with five catches for 59 yards and recorded a 24-yard passing touchdown to running back Rex Burkhead during the 23–17 win. In Week 15 against the Miami Dolphins, Meyers recorded seven catches for 111 yards during the 22–12 loss. In Week 17 against the New York Jets, Meyers recorded 5 catches for 57 yards and a 19-yard passing touchdown on a reverse trick play to quarterback Cam Newton, very similar to his passing touchdown earlier in the season. The Patriots won 28–14. Meyers finished the season with 59 receptions for 729 yards, and while he had yet to record the first touchdown reception of his career, he did throw two touchdown passes.

==== 2021 ====
Meyers scored his first receiving touchdown in Week 10 on an 11-yard pass from Brian Hoyer in the fourth quarter of a 45–7 win over the Cleveland Browns. At the time, Meyers held the modern NFL record for the most receptions (134) and receiving yards (1,560) to start a career without scoring a touchdown. Meyers caught his second touchdown in Week 17 of the season on a 4-yard pass from Mac Jones, adding to an already productive outing, catching all eight of his targets for 73 yards against the Jacksonville Jaguars. After a 70-yard outing in the season finale against the Dolphins, Meyers finished his third season with multiple career highs, as well as leading the team in receptions (83) and receiving yards (866).

==== 2022 ====
On March 13, 2022, the Patriots placed a second-round restricted free agent tender on Meyers. Meyers signed the second-round tender on June 13, 2022, worth $3.9 million.

At the end of a tied Week 15 game against the Las Vegas Raiders, on the last play of the game, Meyers threw a backwards lateral targeted towards Mac Jones after taking a prior lateral from teammate Rhamondre Stevenson. The pass was off the mark and intercepted by Chandler Jones, allowing the Raiders to win on a walk-off touchdown in the 30–24 loss. Post-game, Meyers said in response to his play: “I was trying to do too much…Trying to be a hero, I guess”. The play was later nicknamed the Lunatic Lateral.

Meyers finished the season as the team's leading receiver with 67 catches for 804 yards and six touchdowns. At the end of the season Meyers was the Patriots recipient of the Ed Block Courage award. Meyers was also named as the winner of the Ron Hobson Media Good Guy award.

=== Las Vegas Raiders ===
On March 16, 2023, Meyers signed a three-year, $33 million contract with the Las Vegas Raiders.

In his Raiders debut, Meyers had two touchdowns in the 17–16 win over the Denver Broncos. In the 2023 season, Meyers had 71 receptions for 807 yards and eight touchdowns.

Meyers had ten receptions for 121 yards in Week 12 against the Denver Broncos. In Week 18, against the Los Angeles Chargers, he had nine receptions for 123 yards and a touchdown. In the 2024 season, he had 87 receptions for 1,027 yards and four touchdowns.

On August 25, 2025, Meyers requested a trade from the Raiders amid contract extension discussions with the team. On September 3, Meyers rescinded his trade request, noting that Las Vegas 'said no'.

=== Jacksonville Jaguars ===
On November 4, 2025, the Raiders traded Meyers to the Jacksonville Jaguars in exchange for 2026 fourth (No. 117) and sixth round (No. 182) picks. He signed a three-year, $60 million extension with the team on December 19. Meyers had 75 receptions for 835 yards and three touchdowns in the 2025 season.

== NFL career statistics ==
Legend
| **Bold** | Career high |

=== Regular season ===
| Year | Team | Games | | Receiving | | | | | Rushing | | | | | Passing | | | | | | | Fumbles | |
| Year | Team | GP | GS | Rec | Yds | Avg | Lng | TD | Att | Yds | Avg | Lng | TD | Cmp | Att | Pct | Yds | TD | Int | Rtg | Fum | Lost |
|---|---|---|---|---|---|---|---|---|---|---|---|---|---|---|---|---|---|---|---|---|---|---|
| 2019 | NE | 15 | 1 | 26 | 359 | **13.8** | 35 | 0 | — | — | — | — | — | — | — | — | — | — | — | — | 0 | 0 |
| 2020 | NE | 14 | 9 | 59 | 729 | 12.4 | 35 | 0 | 2 | 9 | 4.5 | 7 | 0 | **2** | 2 | **100.0** | 43 | **2** | 0 | **158.3** | 1 | 1 |
| 2021 | NE | 17 | 16 | 83 | 866 | 10.4 | 39 | 2 | 1 | 9 | 9.0 | 9 | 0 | **2** | 2 | **100.0** | **45** | 0 | 0 | 118.8 | 1 | 1 |
| 2022 | NE | 14 | 13 | 67 | 804 | 12.0 | 48 | 6 | 2 | -11 | -5.5 | 7 | 0 | — | — | — | — | — | — | — | **2** | **2** |
| 2023 | LV | 16 | 16 | 71 | 807 | 11.4 | 33 | **8** | **4** | **24** | 6.0 | 17 | **2** | **2** | **3** | 66.7 | 12 | 1 | 0 | 113.9 | 0 | 0 |
| 2024 | LV | 15 | 15 | **87** | **1,027** | 11.8 | 43 | 4 | 2 | 23 | **11.5** | **20** | 0 | — | — | — | — | — | — | — | 0 | 0 |
| 2025 | LV | 7 | 6 | 33 | 352 | 10.7 | 45 | 0 | – | — | – | – | – | – | – | – | – | – | – | – | 0 | 0 |
| 2025 | JAX | 9 | 7 | 42 | 483 | 11.9 | **50** | 3 | 5 | 13 | 2.6 | 4 | – | – | – | – | – | – | – | – | 1 | 1 |
| 2026 | JAX | 5 | 5 | 15 | 202 | 13.5 | 32 | 2 | 1 | 2 | 2.0 | 2 | 0 | — | — | — | — | — | — | — | 0 | 0 |
| Career | | 112 | 88 | 483 | 5,629 | 11.7 | 50 | 25 | 17 | 69 | 4.1 | 20 | 2 | 6 | 7 | 85.7 | 100 | 3 | 0 | 158.3 | 5 | 5 |

=== Postseason ===
| Year | Team | Games | | Receiving | | | | | Fumbles | |
| Year | Team | GP | GS | Rec | Yds | Avg | Lng | TD | Fum | Lost |
|---|---|---|---|---|---|---|---|---|---|---|
| 2021 | NE | 1 | 1 | **6** | **40** | 6.7 | **19** | 0 | 0 | 0 |
| 2025 | JAX | 1 | 1 | 1 | 12 | **12.0** | 12 | 0 | 0 | 0 |
| Career | | 2 | 2 | 7 | 52 | 7.4 | 19 | 0 | 0 | 0 |
