= Lateral pass =

Type of short pass in football

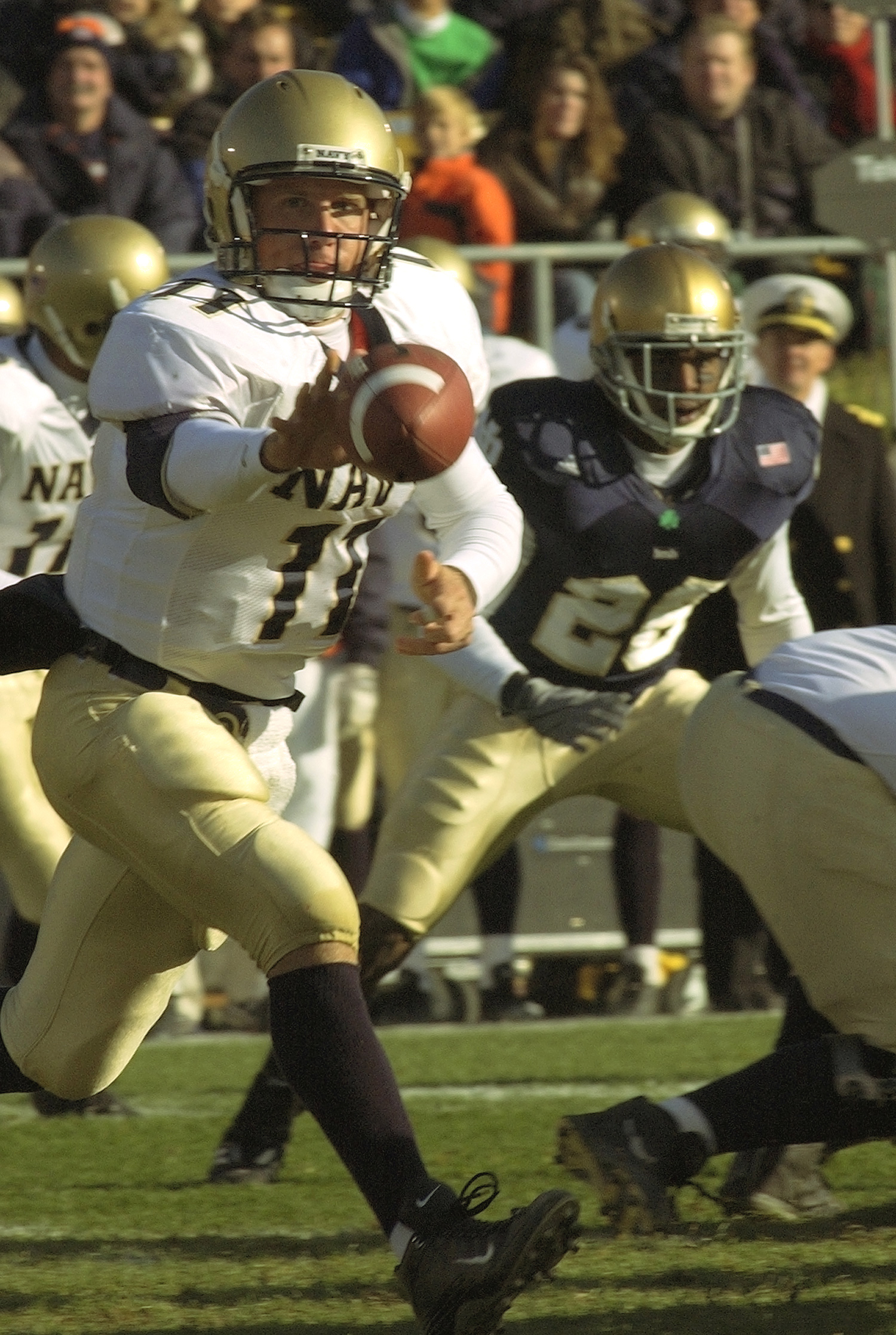
A lateral during an option play.

In gridiron football, a lateral pass or lateral (officially backward pass in American football and onside pass in Canadian football), also called a pitch or a flip, occurs when the ball carrier throws or hands the football to a teammate in a direction parallel to or away from the opponents' goal line. A lateral pass is distinguished from a forward pass, in which the ball is thrown forward, towards the opposition's end zone. In a lateral pass the ball is not advanced, but unlike a forward pass a lateral may be attempted from anywhere on the field by any player to any player at any time.

While the forward pass is an invention of the North American games, the lateral and backward pass is also a part of rugby union and rugby league, where such passes are the only type allowed. Compared to its use in rugby, laterals and backward passes are less common in North American football, due to a much greater focus on ball control in American football strategy; they are most commonly used by the quarterback, after taking the snap, to quickly transfer ("pitch") the ball a short distance to a nearby running back (or, rarely, wide receiver) on a rushing play. Laterals are also often seen as part of a last-minute desperation strategy or as part of a trick play. Examples of plays utilizing the lateral pass are the toss, flea flicker, hook and lateral, and buck-lateral.

== Rules ==
While a forward pass may only be thrown once per down by the team on offense from within or behind the neutral zone, there are no restrictions on the use of lateral passes; any player legally carrying the ball may throw a lateral pass from any position on the field at any time, any player may receive such a pass, and any number of lateral passes may be thrown on a single play. Additionally, a player receiving a lateral pass may throw a forward pass if he is still behind the neutral zone, subject to the forward pass rules. A lateral is the only type of pass that can be legally thrown following a change of possession during a play.

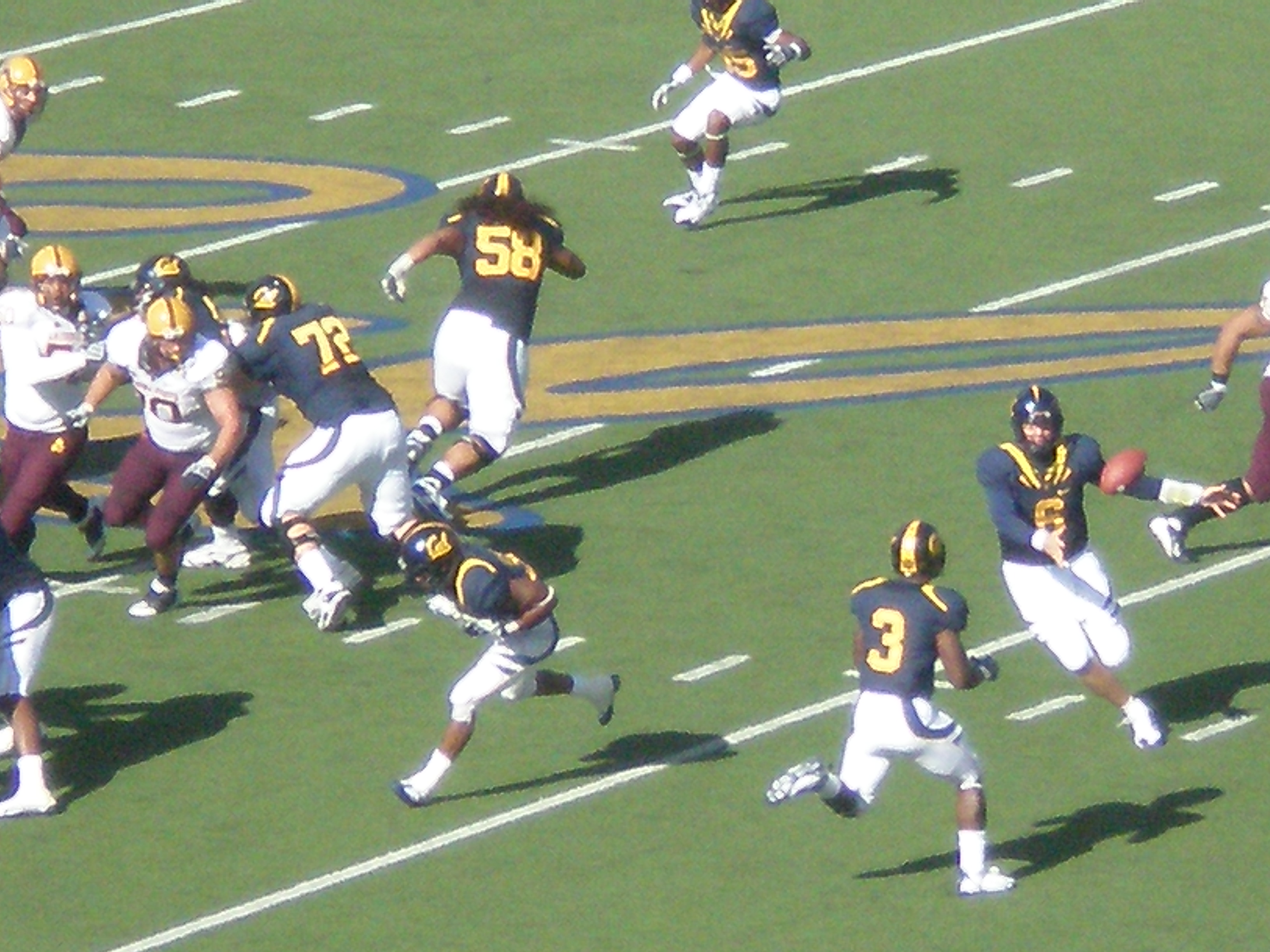
A pitch to a receiver

Unlike a forward pass, if a backward pass hits the ground or an official, play continues and, as with a fumble, a backward pass that has hit the ground may be recovered and advanced by either team. Backward passes can also be intercepted. A lateral may be underhand or overhand as long as the ball is not advanced in the pass.

A ball that is passed exactly sideways is considered a backwards pass. If it hits the ground, the person throwing or "pitching" the lateral pass will be subjected to the fumble designation in the statistics in the NFL, even if the ball is dropped or muffed by a teammate, although in college football this can be credited to whichever player the statistician feels is most responsible. If the ball hits the ground after traveling even slightly forward, however, it is then incomplete instead of a fumble.

The snap is legally considered to be a backward pass, although a blown snap is not scored as a fumble.

== Alternate uses ==
The oxymoron "forward lateral" is used to describe an attempted "lateral" (backward pass) that actually goes forward. In most cases, it is illegal.

A variant, the hook and lateral, where a forward pass is immediately passed backward to a second receiver to fool the defense, is used on occasion. Another variant is called the flea flicker, where a player laterals the ball back to the quarterback before crossing the line of scrimmage.

== Famous plays in history ==
The lateral pass rule, or rather the lack of restrictions contained therein, has given rise to some of the most memorable and incredible walk-off touchdowns in football history. Both collegiate and NFL football have certain examples of football lore which involve laterals. This is not a complete list. This is only the most known plays with lateral passes.

=== One lateral pass ===
A well-known and controversial NFL lateral pass occurred during the Music City Miracle play at the end of the 2000 playoff game between the Tennessee Titans and the Buffalo Bills. The play was a true lateral (the ball did not move forward or backward in the pass), but the receiver was a step ahead of the passer and reached back to catch the ball, so it gave the appearance of an illegal forward pass.

In October 2003, the Minnesota Vikings faced the Denver Broncos with the scores tied at 7–7 as the first half came to a close. With 12 seconds left in the half and the Vikings on their own 41-yard line facing a 3rd-and-24, Daunte Culpepper threw a long pass to Randy Moss, who caught the ball at the Denver 10-yard line. As Moss was being tackled and driven backwards by two Broncos defenders, he tossed the ball over his head for a blind lateral to running back Moe Williams at the 15, and Williams ran it into the end zone for a touchdown to give the Vikings a 14–7 lead at halftime. This play was later named the 68th greatest play in the first 100 years of the NFL.

Another well known play was executed in a college football game by Presbyterian against Wake Forest in 2010. In this trick play, three lateral pass rules were used in combination. First the quarterback passed the ball sideways while intentionally bouncing the ball on the ground (a so-called "fake fumble pass"). The pass-receiver faked the end of the play, suggesting that it was an incomplete pass, but then passed the ball forward to a wide-receiver, who successfully ran for a touchdown. Wake Forest coach Jim Grobe described the play "as well executed as anything I’ve ever seen".

=== Multiple lateral passes ===
In a college football game in 1982, the famous walk-off touchdown simply called The Play happened with five backward passes. In the Big Game between Stanford and California, with four seconds left and trailing by one point, Cal ran the kickoff all the way for the walk-off touchdown using five backward passes, eventually running through the Stanford Band, who had already taken the field (believing the game was over after Stanford players appeared to have tackled a Cal ball-carrier). The game remains controversial because of Stanford's contention that the Cal player's knee was down before he passed the ball during the third lateral and that the fifth lateral was an illegal forward pass.

In an NFL game in 2003, there was a well known play called the River City Relay with three lateral passes. The game was between the New Orleans Saints and the Jacksonville Jaguars. The game was held on December 21, 2003. With time running out, the Saints threw backward passes and brought the ball down the length of the field for a touchdown. However, kicker John Carney missed the extra point, which would have tied the game, so the Saints lost by one point, 20–19.

In a Division III college football game in 2007 there was a walk-off touchdown play with 15 lateral passes. On October 27, 2007, Trinity University was trailing by two points with two seconds left in a game against conference rival Millsaps College. Starting from their own 39-yard line, Trinity called a play for a short pass across the middle. The receiver pitched the ball backward, with a sequence of additional backward passes as players were in danger of being tackled. The "Mississippi Miracle" ultimately included 15 backward passes as it covered 61 yards for the walk-off touchdown.

On October 31, 2015, the Miami Hurricanes college football team threw eight lateral passes over the course of 45 seconds to score a touchdown and upset the 22nd-ranked Duke Blue Devils 30–27. The play stirred controversy amid a number of missed calls by the Atlantic Coast Conference officiating crew, which subsequently resulted in a two-game suspension for both the on-field crew along with the replay officials.

On December 9, 2018, there was a play with two lateral passes for a walk-off touchdown in an NFL game. The Miami Dolphins pulled off the only walk-off touchdown to involve multiple lateral passes in NFL history, completing two laterals for a 69-yard touchdown to beat the New England Patriots 34–33. Miami had almost lost a game against the Pittsburgh Steelers five years prior via laterals, but managed to win when Antonio Brown stepped out of bounds at the thirteen-yard line.

== See also ==
- Hail Mary pass
