= Buck-lateral series =

Traditional Buck-lateral football play

Buck-lateral is an American football play or a series of plays used in the Single-wing formation. Since the Single-Wing formation lost prominence by 1950, the football play referred to as the buck-lateral is almost gone from football's vocabulary. However, prior to this time, the buck-lateral play gave fullbacks the option to run, lateral, or hand off the ball to another player. Running the buck-lateral required an offensive scheme that needed the fullback to possess many specialized skills, as opposed to today's fullback who mainly blocks and carries the ball infrequently.

== Origin of name ==
Before the invention of the Single-Wing offense by Pop Warner, offenses used simple plays designed for runners to attack the defensive front behind massed line blocking. This battering ram approach usually involved the biggest runner, the fullback, as his main role was to "buck", or smash, the middle of the defensive front.

The term lateral describes a short toss from one back to another that does not advance the ball. (see lateral pass) A ball that goes forward to another player is called a forward pass. The pass and the lateral are both allowed to advance the ball when the offense is operating behind their line of scrimmage. Once beyond the line of scrimmage the lateral is the only means of transferring the ball to another player.

The buck-lateral was a play designed for single wing fullbacks to receive the toss from the center, and start toward the central part of the line to make the play look like a typical smash or buck. However, at some point the fullback might pause to do one of several deceptive options, usually handing-off to passing backs or even keeping the ball and plowing ahead. If the fullback delivers the ball to another back, the new carrier might have several additional options including handing or lateralling the ball to still another back.

Warner's Carlisle formation, or Single-Wing, added additional misdirection and trickery to allow for runners to gain yards by deceiving the defense. The Single-wing also allowed the offense to put more blockers at the point of attack than the defense could muster.

== The buck-lateral series ==
The buck-lateral play was actually a series of plays that started out the same way with the fullback taking the direct snap from center, then directing his forward movement toward the middle of the line of scrimmage. The play had several scripted or "read" options to confuse the defense. The player who was given permission to read the play could determine for himself whether to keep the ball or deliver it to another player. The fullback could basically either keep the ball to pound the middle of the line, or he could give the ball to one of the three other single-wing backs, usually the quarterback. Once in possession, the quarterback then continued the possibilities for initiating other permutations to the play.

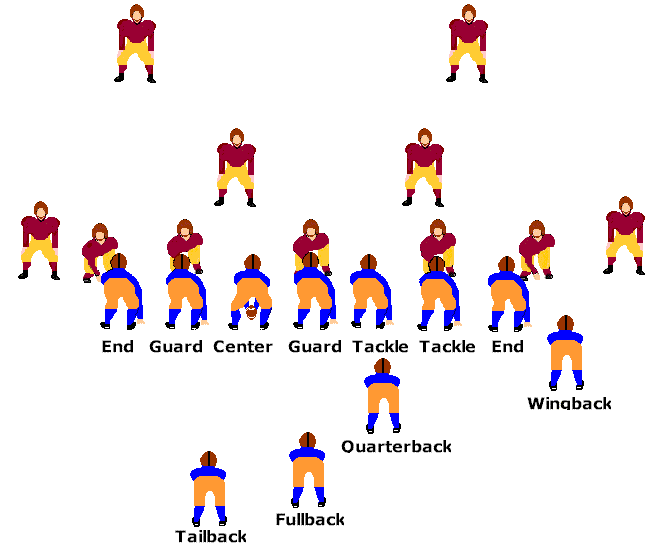
Single-wing formation similar to Pop Warner's playbook

To understand the mechanics of the play, one has to understand basic terminology of the single-wing formation. The tailback was stationed four and one-half yards behind the short-side guard. In a typical formation, the fullback would line up three and one-half yards behind the long-side guard. One and one-half yards behind the tackle or guard, would be the quarterback or blocking back. Finally, the wingback aligns himself to the outside of the opposing defensive tackle. He is only one yard off the line.

In most offenses the tailback was the main ball handler and generator of offense; however, the fullback could also take the direct snap due to his proximity to the tailback. In fact whenever the ball was snapped, one of the two backs would take the snap while the other feigned taking the snap to confuse the defense.

A popular scenario for the buck-lateral saw the fullback with the option to hand-off to the quarterback. The quarterback, on taking the ball, could try to sweep the end or toss the ball to the tailback, who had been paralleling the play more deeply in the backfield. If the tailback takes the lateral from the quarterback, he is in position to sweep the end, or even throw the ball to a receiver down field.

Coaches created different versions of the buck-lateral depending on the versatility of the backfield. In one version the fullback might fake a hand-off to the quarterback, who is standing with his back to the defense to hide the lack of exchange. In another version, the fullback could give the ball to the quarterback, who then might initiate a reverse by giving the ball to the wingback coming back against the flow of the play. In another twist, the quarterback could take the fullback hand-off and complete a jump-pass.

The buck-lateral was especially deceptive and effective, but hard to execute. The single-wing fullback had to have the skills of a modern-day quarterback in handling the ball. Plus, he had to be able to take the punishment associated with bucking the middle of the defense where the bigger, stronger defensive players were stationed.

When the fullback took the snap, defensive players expected the play to hit the center of the line because the traditional role of the fullback was to grind out yardage between the tackles. Defensive players who rushed to stop the fullback at the guard-center gap might be totally surprised if the fullback slipped the ball to the nearby quarterback who was heading in another direction.

Consequently, single-wing teams that could master the buck-lateral series of plays could be successful by always making the defense guess to where the ball was going. Of course, if the defense loses sight of the ball during the fakes or laterals, then the defense is at an extreme disadvantage.

Today's coaches would call the buck-lateral a gadget play, because it was designed to thoroughly confuse the defense by making its members lose sight of the ball with fakes, counter action, and laterals. Trick plays are harder to execute and demand considerably more practice time than less complicated plays.
