= River City Relay =

American football play, by the Saints against the Jaguars, in 2003

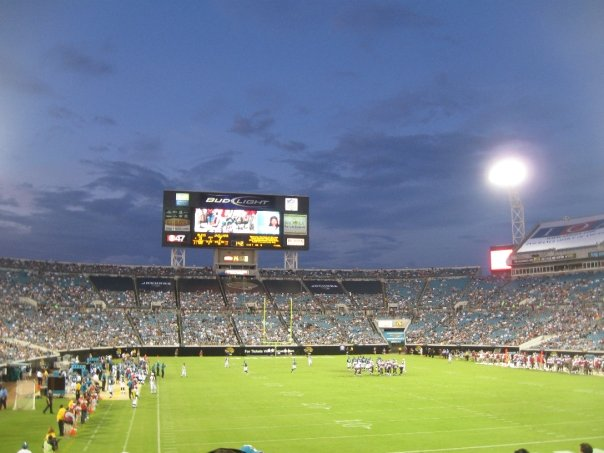
- EverBank Stadium (then Alltel Stadium), site of the game
New Orleans Saints (7–7)	Jacksonville Jaguars (4–10)
19	20
Head coach: Jim Haslett	Head coach: Jack Del Rio
	1	2	3	4	Total
NO	3	7	3	6	19
JAX	0	17	3	0	20
- Date: December 21, 2003
- Stadium: Alltel Stadium; Jacksonville, Florida
- Referee: Gerald Austin

TV in the United States
- Network: Fox
- Announcers: Curt Menefee and Tim Green

The River City Relay was a play in a National Football League (NFL) game involving the New Orleans Saints and Jacksonville Jaguars that took place on December 21, 2003, at Alltel Stadium, now known as EverBank Stadium, in Jacksonville, Florida. With the Jaguars leading 20–13, the Saints used three laterals to score a touchdown as time expired in regulation. However, Saints kicker John Carney missed the ensuing extra point that would have sent the game into overtime, and instead gave the Jaguars the 20–19 victory.

== Background ==
The Saints, at 7–7 entering the game, were attempting to reach the playoffs for the first time since 2000. However, they needed to win both of their final two games to have a chance at qualifying for the postseason. The Jaguars had already been eliminated from postseason contention. While the Saints led early on in the game 3–0 after a John Carney field goal, the scoring had been mostly dominated by the Jaguars. With just seven seconds left at the end of regulation, the Jaguars had built a 20–13 lead on the Saints.

== The play ==
Jerome Pathon scoring the touchdown

The Saints were on their own 25-yard line looking at second down and 10. Quarterback Aaron Brooks passed the ball to the right side of the field to receiver Donté Stallworth, who caught the pass at midfield. Stallworth then bounced off a tackle attempt by Jaguars cornerback Fernando Bryant and turned inside and broke two more tackles. The clock had already reached zero, and Stallworth pitched the ball to the 34-yard line to Michael Lewis, who ran the ball to the Jaguars' 25-yard line. He then turned and pitched the ball to Deuce McAllister, who ran to the Jaguars' 20-yard line. McAllister then pitched the ball to the right side of the field to Jerome Pathon, who caught the ball at the Jaguars' 24-yard line. Brooks, who had hustled all the way downfield, then laid a block on the last Jaguars defender and Pathon dove into the end zone.

There was a lengthy delay while the officials determined that all of the ball transfers (after the pass to Stallworth) were indeed legal laterals. All the Saints needed was a John Carney extra point to send the game into overtime. Saints head coach Jim Haslett decided not to attempt a two-point conversion to win the game immediately.

== Aftermath ==
Carney lined up to kick the extra point, hit a dead push, and the kick sailed wide right. The famous reaction of Saints play-by-play radio announcer Jim Henderson was a horrified, anguished scream: "NOOOO!!! He missed the extra point wide right! Oh my God, how could he do that?" With no time remaining on the clock, the game was over, giving the Jaguars an improbable 20–19 victory. Sports writer Jon Bois calculated the chances of a successful lateral play followed by a missed extra point, based on statistics from the year 2000 onward, to be 1.2% for the lateral play, and the missed extra point from the two-yard line to be 1%. When combined it comes to a statistical probability of 0.012% with the next season to include such an event to be in the year 3500.

Earlier in the season, Coach Haslett had stated to the media that he trusted Carney so much, that he'd even stake his life on him. When reminded later that day of those same comments, Haslett stated, "Then I'd probably be dead right now. He's one of the great all-time kickers. I never would have guessed this would happen."

With the loss, the Saints fell to 7–8 on the season and were eliminated from contention for the 2003 NFL playoffs. However, even if the Saints had won in overtime, they still would have been eliminated from the playoffs, as the Dallas Cowboys won their tenth game of the season that day (9 was the highest possible number of wins the Saints could have had if they won) and the Seahawks eventually won their tenth game to gain a wild card. The Saints, however, finished their season on a high note the next week with a 13–7 home victory over the very same playoff-bound Cowboys. For the Jaguars, the victory lifted them to a 5–10 record. They went on to lose the next week, 21–14, to the Atlanta Falcons.

The River City Relay later went on to win the 2004 Best Play ESPY Award. It was the last multi-lateral touchdown in an NFL game until the Miracle in Miami in 2018, which saw Miami win the game 34-33, with no extra point attempt required.

2003 Week 16: New Orleans Saints at Jacksonville Jaguars

Quarter	1	2	3	4	Total
Saints	3	7	3	6	19
Jaguars	0	17	3	0	20

at Alltel Stadium, Jacksonville, Florida

- Date: December 21, 2003
- Game time: 1:00 p.m. EDT
- Game weather: 52 °F (11 °C), Sunny
- Game attendance: 49,207
- Referee: Gerald Austin
- TV announcers (Fox): Curt Menefee and Tim Green
- Boxscore

Game information

First quarter

- NO – John Carney 33-yard field goal, 4:19. Saints 3-0. Drive: 12 plays, 58 yards, 5:00.

Second quarter

- JAX – Seth Marler 43-yard field goal, 13:30. Tied 3-3. Drive: 12 plays, 45 yards, 5:49.
- JAX – LaBrandon Toefield 14-yard pass from Byron Leftwich (Seth Marler kick), 6:54. Jaguars 10-3. Drive: 5 plays, 62 yards, 2:00.
- NO – Boo Williams 2-yard pass from Aaron Brooks (John Carney kick), 2:55. Tied 10-10. Drive: 3 plays, 8 yards, 1:23.
- JAX – Fred Taylor 1-yard run (Seth Marler kick), 0:21. Jaguars 17-10. Drive: 7 plays, 70 yards, 2:34.

Third quarter

- NO – John Carney 38-yard field goal, 3:32. Jaguars 17-13. Drive: 7 plays, 55 yards, 3:46.
- JAX – Seth Marler 35-yard field goal, 0:09. Jaguars 20-13. Drive: 7 plays, 46 yards, 3:23.

Fourth quarter

- NO – Jerome Pathon 21-yard pass from Aaron Brooks (John Carney kick failed), 0:00. Jaguars 20-19. Drive: 2 plays, 75 yards, 0:11.

Top passers

- NO – Aaron Brooks – 22/38, 296 yards, 2 TD
- JAX – Byron Leftwich – 9/17, 131 yards, TD, 2 INT

Top rushers

- NO – Deuce McAllister – 21 carries, 50 yards
- JAX – Fred Taylor – 34 carries, 194 yards, TD

Top receivers

- NO – Jerome Pathon – 4 receptions, 65 yards, TD
- JAX – Fred Taylor – 2 receptions, 31 yards

== Officials ==
- Referee: Gerald Austin (#34)
- Umpire: Roy Ellison (#81)
- Head linesman: John Schleyer (#21)
- Line judge: Carl Johnson (#101)
- Field judge: Scott Edwards (#3)
- Side judge: Rick Patterson (#15)
- Back judge: Jim Howey (#37)

== See also ==
- The Play, a similar last-second play in a 1982 college football game
- 2007 Trinity vs. Millsaps football game, a 2007 NCAA Division III game that featured a similar, but even longer, game-ending play
- List of nicknamed NFL games and plays
- Wide Right (Buffalo Bills)
- Miracle in Miami
- Lunatic Lateral
