= 8th NFL Honors =

2019 American football awards ceremony

- Date: February 2, 2019
- Site: Fox Theatre (Atlanta, Georgia)
- Hosted by: Steve Harvey

Television coverage
- Network: CBS/CBS All Access
- Duration: 2 hours

The 8th NFL Honors was an awards presentation by the National Football League that honored its best players from the 2018 NFL season. It was held on February 2, 2019, at the Fox Theatre in Atlanta, Georgia and pre–recorded for same–day broadcast on CBS (and streamed on CBS All Access for the second time) in the United States at 9:00 PM/8:00 PM CT. Five finalists went to the Pro Football Hall of Fame in Canton, Ohio. Steve Harvey hosted the ceremony.

== List of award winners ==
| Award | Player | Position | Team | Ref |
|---|---|---|---|---|
| AP MVP | Patrick Mahomes | QB | Kansas City Chiefs | |
| AP Coach of the Year | Matt Nagy | HC | Chicago Bears | |
| AP Assistant Coach of the Year | Vic Fangio | DC | Chicago Bears | |
| AP Offensive Player of the Year | Patrick Mahomes | QB | Kansas City Chiefs | |
| AP Defensive Player of the Year | Aaron Donald | DT | Los Angeles Rams | |
| Pepsi NEXT Rookie of the Year | Saquon Barkley | RB | New York Giants | |
| AP Offensive Rookie of the Year | Saquon Barkley | RB | New York Giants | |
| AP Defensive Rookie of the Year | Shaquille Leonard | LB | Indianapolis Colts | |
| AP Comeback Player of the Year | Andrew Luck | QB | Indianapolis Colts | |
| Don Shula NFL High School Coach of the Year award | Gabe Infante | HC | St. Joseph's Preparatory School | |
| Walter Payton NFL Man of the Year award | Chris Long | DE | Philadelphia Eagles | |
| FedEx Air Player of the Year | Patrick Mahomes | QB | Kansas City Chiefs | |
| FedEx Ground Player of the Year | Saquon Barkley | RB | New York Giants | |
| Bridgestone Performance Play of the Year | Miami Miracle | | Miami Dolphins | |
| Moment of the Year | Aaron Rodgers | QB | Green Bay Packers | |
| Courtyard Unstoppable Performance of the Year | Jared Goff | QB | Los Angeles Rams | |
| Game Changer award | Shaquem Griffin | LB | Seattle Seahawks | |
| Salute to Service award | Ben Garland | G | Atlanta Falcons | |
| Deacon Jones Award | Aaron Donald | DT | Los Angeles Rams | |
| Art Rooney Award | Drew Brees | QB | New Orleans Saints | |
| Built Ford Tough Offensive Line of the Year | Andrew Whitworth | LT | Los Angeles Rams | |
| Built Ford Tough Offensive Line of the Year | Rodger Saffold | LG | Los Angeles Rams | |
| Built Ford Tough Offensive Line of the Year | John Sullivan | C | Los Angeles Rams | |
| Built Ford Tough Offensive Line of the Year | Austin Blythe | RG | Los Angeles Rams | |
| Built Ford Tough Offensive Line of the Year | Rob Havenstein | RT | Los Angeles Rams | |
| Pro Football Hall of Fame Class of 2019 | Champ Bailey | CB | | |
| Pro Football Hall of Fame Class of 2019 | Pat Bowlen | Owner | | |
| Pro Football Hall of Fame Class of 2019 | Gil Brandt | VP | | |
| Pro Football Hall of Fame Class of 2019 | Tony Gonzalez | TE | | |
| Pro Football Hall of Fame Class of 2019 | Ty Law | CB | | |
| Pro Football Hall of Fame Class of 2019 | Kevin Mawae | C | | |
| Pro Football Hall of Fame Class of 2019 | Ed Reed | S | | |
| Pro Football Hall of Fame Class of 2019 | Johnny Robinson | S | | |
| Celebration of the Year | "Choreography" | | Seattle Seahawks | |
