= Dalman =

Dalman is a surname. Notable people with the surname include:

- Albert Gustaf Dahlman (1848–1920), born Albert Gustaf Dalman, Swedish executioner
- Cecilia Dalman Eek (born 1960), Swedish politician
- Chris Dalman (born 1970), former professional American football player
- Drew Dalman (born 1998), American football player
- Elizabeth Cameron Dalman (born 1934), Australian choreographer
- Gustaf Dalman (1855–1941), German Lutheran theologian and orientalist
- Jessie Dalman (born 1933), American politician
- Johan Dalman (born 1960), Swedish Lutheran bishop
- Johan Wilhelm Dalman (1787–1828), Swedish physician and a naturalist
- Joseph Dalman (1882–1944), German screenwriter
- Mehmet Dalman, British-Turkish Cypriot investment banker
- Olle Dalman (1922–2007), Swedish alpine skier

== See also ==
- Jose Dalman, Zamboanga del Norte, 4th class municipality in the province of Zamboanga del Norte, Philippines
