= Dallmann =

Dallmann is a surname. Notable people with the surname include:

- Eduard Dallmann (1830–1896), German whaler, trader, and Polar explorer
- Petra Dallmann (born 1978), German swimmer
- Werner Dallmann (1924–1945), German Obersturmführer (first lieutenant)
