= Malcolm Dolman =

Australian former cricketer

Personal information
- Full name: Malcolm Charles Dolman
- Born: 14 June 1960 (age 66); North Adelaide, South Australia
- Batting: Left-handed
- Bowling: Slow left-arm wrist-spin
- Role: Bowler

Domestic team information
- Years: Team
- 1981/82–1982/83: South Australia

Career statistics
Competition	First-class
Matches	6
Runs scored	6
Batting average	3.00
100s/50s	0/0
Top score	6
Balls bowled	1,093
Wickets	14
Bowling average	40.28
5 wickets in innings	0
10 wickets in match	0
Best bowling	4/114
Catches/stumpings	0/–
- Source: ESPNcricinfo, 18 March 2024

Malcolm Charles Dolman (born 14 June 1960) is an Australian former cricketer.

Born in North Adelaide, South Australia, Dolman started bowling slow left-arm wrist-spin at primary school and was first noticed as a promising bowler aged 14. He began appearing in representative schoolboy sides and made the Australian Young Cricketers team to England in 1977, playing two unofficial One Day Internationals against England Young Cricketers, and an Australian U/19s tour to Sri Lanka, playing in an unofficial Test match.

Coached by former Test spinner Rex Sellers, Dolman also showed great promise in Adelaide Grade cricket and played colts matches for South Australia, although he was kept from first-class cricket for two years to mature him. This just intensified support for Dolman, who was being called "possibly the most innovative bowler in Australian cricket for a decade" and had former Test player Jack Fingleton calling for his inclusion in the national side before his first-class debut.

After returning from the Interstate Under 23 Cricket Carnival in December 1981, where he was considered one of the leading players, Dolman finally made his first-class debut for South Australia on 8 January 1982 against Queensland at the Adelaide Oval, taking 4/114 (his best bowling figures) and 2/47.

Following his successful first-class debut, Dolman was awarded an Esso Australian Cricket Scholarship for the 1982 English cricket season, where he played for Warwickshire County Cricket Club's Second XI in the Second XI Championship, playing six matches and taking 39 wickets at 14.90, with a best return of 7/38 against Leicestershire Second XI, and scoring 174 runs at 29.00, with a highest score of 82 against Leicestershire. The former Australian Test spinner Ashley Mallett called him the most exciting spin prospect he had ever seen and English cricket writer David Frith was also enthusiastic about Dolman's cricketing future. Nevertheless, Dolman's second season of first-class cricket proved to be his last, consisting of only a single match against the touring English side on 31 October 1982, when he took 2/72.

Dolman coached Adelaide University to an A-grade district premiership before retiring from cricket to concentrate on his career, initially as a teacher before switching to consulting not-for-profit organisations on developing sponsorship and fundraising programs and coordinating high-profile community programs.

== Sources ==
- Frith, D. (1984) The Slow Men, Richard Smart Publishing. ISBN 0-7255-1540-6.
- Ryan, C. (2009) Golden Boy, Allen & Unwin, Sydney. ISBN 978-1-74175-067-6.
- South Australian Cricket Association (S.A.C.A.) Annual Report 1981–82, S.A.C.A.: Adelaide.
