= Moshe Talmon =

Israeli psychologist (born 1950)

Moshe Talmon (Hebrew: משה טלמון) was born in Kibbutz Beit Alpha in 1950. He is one of the founders of a psychotherapy method known as Single-Session Therapy or (SST).

== Education and career ==
Talmon received his PhD in Clinical Psychology at the University of Pennsylvania in 1982. He interned at PCGC (Philadelphia Child Guidance Clinic) in the Children’s Hospital of Philadelphia, under the supervision of Salvador Minuchin. He served as a clinical director of the Kibbutz Child and Family Clinic located in Hadera, Israel. During his tenure at Kaiser Permanente Medical Group (1985-1991) he initiated a series of studies on Single-Session-therapy with Michael Hoyt and Robert Rosenbaum. In 1990 he founded the SST international Center in San Francisco to provide training, supervision on consultations to mental-health organizations.

Nowadays, he hosts workshops around the world and is a lecturer in the international program at Tel-Aviv University, and teaches advanced methods of psychotherapy and lead a research seminar on well-being for MA students at The Academic College of Tel Aviv-Yafo.

== Works ==
=== Books ===
- Talmon, M. Single Session Therapy: Maximizing the Effect of the First (and often Only) Therapeutic Encounter. San Francisco, Jossey – bass, 1990.
- Talmon, M. Single Session Solution: A Guide to Practical, Effective and Affordable Therapy. New York, Addison – Wesley, 1993.
- Hoyt, M.& Talmon, M.(editors) Capturing the Moment: Single Session Therapy and Walk-In Services, Crown House Publishing, 2014.

=== Articles & Chapters ===
- Kaffman, M., Talmon, M. (1982) “The Crisis of Divorce: An opportunity for constructive change “ International Journal of Family Therapy. 4, 420-433,.
- Wood, B., Talmon, M. (1983) “Family Boundaries in Transition: A search for alternatives. Family Process.” 22, 347-357,
- Rosenbaum, R., Hoyt, M., Talmon, M. (1990) “The Challenge of Single Session Therapies: Creating Pivotal Moments” in R. Wells and V. Giantetti (Eds.). The Handbook of Brief Therapies. N.Y.: Plenum,
- Hoyt, M., Rosenbaum, R. & Talmon, M. (1992). “Planned Single-Session Therapy.” In S. Budman, M Hoyt, S. Friedman (Eds.). The First Session Brief Psychotherapy. New York: Guilford, pp. 59–86.
- Rosenbaum, R., Talmon, M. & Hoyt, M. (1993). “Heavy Ideals: A strategic single-session intervention for achieving weight loss through increasing autonomy” In Wells, R. & Gianetti, V. (Eds.). Casebook of the Brief Psychotherapies. New York: Plenum.
- Talmon, M. (2014) When less is More: 25 years of Maximizing the Effect of Every (and Often Only) Session. In Hoyt & Talmon(eds.), Capturing the Moment: Single-Session Therapy and Walk-in Services, Crown House Publishers
- Talmon, M., Hoyt, M.F. (2014), Moments are Forever. In Hoyt & Talmon (eds.) Capturing the Moment: Single-Session Therapy and Walk-in Services. Crown House Publishers.
