= Eric Dolman =

Welsh cricketer

Personal information
- Full name: Charles Eric Dolman
- Born: 17 July 1903; Abertillery, Monmouthshire, Wales
- Died: 6 June 1969 (aged 65); Bristol, England
- Batting: Right-handed
- Bowling: Right-arm medium

Domestic team information
- Years: Team
- 1926–1928: Wales
- 1922–1934: Monmouthshire

Career statistics
| Competition | First-class |
|---|---|
| Matches | 2 |
| Runs scored | 46 |
| Batting average | 23.00 |
| 100s/50s | –/– |
| Top score | 35 |
| Balls bowled | 168 |
| Wickets | 2 |
| Bowling average | 42.50 |
| 5 wickets in innings | – |
| 10 wickets in match | – |
| Best bowling | 1/22 |
| Catches/stumpings | –/– |
- Source: Cricinfo, 30 August 2011

Charles Eric Dolman (17 July 1903 – 6 June 1969) was a Welsh cricketer. Dolman was a right-handed batsman who bowled right-arm medium pace. He was born in Abertillery, Monmouthshire.

Dolman made his debut for Monmouthshire against Devon in the 1922 Minor Counties Championship. He played Minor counties cricket for Monmouthshire from 1922 to 1934, making 52 appearances. After 1934, Monmouthshire didn't enter a team in the Minor Counties Championship. During his career he made two first-class appearances, both for Wales. The first of these was in 1926 when Wales played Ireland, a match in which Dolman took the wicket of Gustavus Kelly in the Irish first-innings and Jim Ganly in their second-innings, while in Wales only innings he scored 11 runs before being dismissed by Gustavus Kelly. His second first-class appearance came in 1928 against the touring West Indians, a match in which he went wicket-less, while he scored 35 runs in Wales first-innings before being dismissed by Snuffy Browne. He also played for the Glamorgan Second XI in 1936.

Later in his life he was the Lord Mayor of Cardiff in 1967. He died two years later in Bristol, England on 6 June 1969.
