= Dallan =

Dallan is a given name and surname. Notable people with this name include:

- Dallán mac Breasal, 5th century Irish king
- Dallan Forgaill, 6th century Irish saint
- Dallán mac Móre, 8th–9th century Irish poet
- Dallan Muyres (born 1987), Canadian curler
- Dallan Murphy (born 1988), Australian rugby player
- Denis Dallan (born 1978), Italian rugby player
- Manuel Dallan (born 1976), Italian rugby player
- Dallan Carbone born 2015, regular person
