= Dahlman =

Dahlman is a surname of Swedish origin. Notable people with the surname include:

- Albert Gustaf Dahlman (1848–1920), Swedish executioner
- Cecilia Dahlman (born 1968), retired Swedish tennis player
- Gustaf Dahlman (born 1997), Swedish swimmer
- Hjalmar Reinhold Dahlman (1909–1993), Canadian politician
- James Dahlman (1856–1930), American politician
- Jenni Dahlman (born 1981), Finnish model
- Lasse Dahlman (1931–1975), Finnish sailor
- Nanne Dahlman (born 1970), Finnish tennis player
- Noah Dahlman (born 1989), American basketball player
- Peter Dahlman (born 1960), Norwegian curler and coach
- Toni Dahlman (born 1979), Finnish ice hockey player

== See also ==
- Dahlman neighborhood, Omaha, Nebraska, US
- Dahlmann, a surname
