= Dilman =

Dilman may refer to:

== Geography ==
- Dilman, Azerbaijan, village and municipality in the Agsu Rayon of Azerbaijan
- Former name of Salmas, Iran
  - Location of Battle of Dilman, 1915
- Deylaman, Iran

== People ==
=== Surname ===
- Artur Dilman (born 1990), Kazakh swimmer
- Daniil Dilman (born 1996), Russian snowboarder
- Viktor Dilman (born 1926), Russian scientist
- Vladimir Dilman (1925–1994), Soviet scientist and physician

=== Given name ===
- Dilman Dila, Ugandan writer
- Dilman Kinsey Erb, Canadian educator, farmer, and politician
