= Jerome Pathon =

American football player (born 1975)

No. 86, 80, 82
- Position: Wide receiver

Personal information
- Born: December 16, 1975 (age 50); Cape Town, South Africa
- Listed height: 6 ft 0 in (1.83 m)
- Listed weight: 195 lb (88 kg)

Career information
- High school: Carson Graham Secondary School (North Vancouver, British Columbia, Canada)
- College: Acadia (1993–1994); Washington (1995–1997)
- NFL draft: 1998: 2nd round, 32nd overall pick
- CFL draft: 1997: 2nd round, 11th overall pick

Career history

Playing
- Indianapolis Colts (1998–2001); New Orleans Saints (2002–2004); Seattle Seahawks (2005)*; Atlanta Falcons (2005)
- * Offseason or practice squad member only

Coaching
- San Diego (2009–2011) Wide receivers coach; South Florida (2012–2016) Wide receivers coach

Awards and highlights
- PFWA All-Rookie Team (1998); First-team All-American (1997); First-team All-Pac-10 (1997); Second-team All-Pac-10 (1996); AUS Football Rookie of the Year (1993); CIAU Football Rookie of the Year (1993)

Career NFL statistics
- Receptions: 260
- Receiving yards: 3,350
- Receiving touchdowns: 15
- Return yards: 773
- Stats at Pro Football Reference

Jerome Pathon (born December 16, 1975) is a South African-born Canadian former gridiron football player who was a wide receiver for eight seasons in the National Football League (NFL). He played college football for the Washington Huskies, earning first-team All-American honors in 1997. Selected by the Indianapolis Colts in the second round of the 1998 NFL draft, he played in the NFL for the Colts, New Orleans Saints, and Atlanta Falcons. After his playing career, he was a position coach for both the University of South Florida and University of San Diego football teams.

== Early life ==
Born in Cape Town, South Africa, Pathon's family emigrated due to apartheid and settled in Vancouver when he was five. Pathon initially played soccer and ran track before picking up Canadian gridiron football at 14 years old. He was a student of Carson Graham Secondary School in North Vancouver, Canada from 1987 to 1992.

== College career ==
Initially denied a scholarship to several American universities and more local Canadian schools, Pathon attended Acadia University in Wolfville, Nova Scotia for one year (1993–94), where he had 44 receptions and 868 receiving yards and was named Atlantic University Sport (AUS) and Canadian Interuniversity Athletics Union (CIAU) Football Rookie of the Year.

Pathon accepted a chance to walk on for the University of Washington Huskies, where he eventually became a standout wide receiver over three seasons from 1995 to 1997. His 73 receptions his senior year was the most in school history at the time and still ranks fifth all-time on the Huskies' single season record book. He gained 1,299 yards receiving that year at an average of 108.3 yards per game, both school records at the time, including 4 receptions for 54 yards in the Huskies' 51–23 victory over Michigan State in the 1997 Aloha Bowl.

== NFL playing career ==
Pre-draft measurables
Height	Weight	Arm length	Hand span
6 ft 0 in (1.83 m)	187 lb (85 kg)	30 7/8 in (0.78 m)	9 7/8 in (0.25 m)
All values from NFL Combine

Pathon was originally drafted 32nd overall in the second round of the 1998 NFL draft by the Indianapolis Colts. He was also selected by the Montreal Alouettes in the second round (11th overall) of the 1997 CFL draft. Pathon played 46 regular-season games for Indianapolis (1998–2001) and 45 games for the New Orleans Saints from 2002 to 2004. On December 21, 2003, during his time with the Saints, he scored the touchdown in the famous play known as The River City Relay, which could have led to a tie game, but only for the extra point to be missed by John Carney. He also played for the Atlanta Falcons in 2005. He finished with 260 career receptions for 3,350 yards and 15 touchdowns in 99 NFL games played as well as 36 kickoff returns for 773 yards.

== NFL career statistics ==
Legend
**Bold**	Career high

=== Regular season ===
Year	Team	Games		Receiving				
Year	Team	GP	GS	Rec	Yds	Avg	Lng	TD
1998	IND	16	15	**50**	511	10.2	45	1
1999	IND	10	2	14	163	11.6	38	0
2000	IND	16	10	**50**	**646**	12.9	38	3
2001	IND	4	3	24	330	13.8	60	2
2002	NOR	14	13	43	523	12.2	**64**	**4**
2003	NOR	16	12	44	578	13.1	40	**4**
2004	NOR	15	7	34	581	17.1	38	1
2005	ATL	9	0	1	18	**18.0**	18	0
		100	62	260	3,350	12.9	64	15

=== Playoffs ===
Year	Team	Games		Receiving				
Year	Team	GP	GS	Rec	Yds	Avg	Lng	TD
1999	IND	1	0	**5**	44	8.8	13	0
2000	IND	1	1	**5**	**69**	**13.8**	**25**	**1**
		2	1	10	113	11.3	25	1

== Coaching career ==
Pathon became the wide receivers coach at the University of San Diego in July 2009. Pathon became the wide receivers coach at South Florida in February 2012.

== Lawsuit against the NFL ==
In December 2011, Pathon announced that he and a group of 11 other professional players had filed a lawsuit against the NFL. Pathon and his attorneys allege that the League failed to properly treat head injuries in spite of prevailing medical evidence, leading the players to develop effects of brain injury ranging from chronic headaches to depression.

== See also ==
- Washington Huskies football statistical leaders
