= Tall Man =

Tall Man may refer to:

- Tall Man (album), a 1979 country album
- Tall Man (Phantasm), a fictional character
- Tall Man (Trilby's Notes), a fictional character
- Tall Man lettering, using upper case lettering in drug names to avoid medication errors
- Tall man, a video installation by artist Vernon Ah Kee
- Tall man, the middle finger on a human hand, as in the lyrics for "Where is Thumbkin"

== See also ==
- The Tall Man (disambiguation)
