= Dallam =

Dallam may refer to:

- Dallam County, Texas, United States
- Dallam, Warrington, Cheshire, England
- Dallam School, Milnthorpe, Cumbria, England
- Dallam Tower, historic house near Milnthorpe, Cumbria, England
- Dallam family of English organ-builders
- Dallam's Decisions, a private law report for the Republic of Texas

== People with surname Dallam ==
- James Wilmer Dallam, American lawyer and newspaper publisher after whom Dallam County, Texas is named
- Richard Dallam (1865–1939), American politician from Maryland
- Thomas Dallam (c. 1570 – after 1614) first of family of organ builders
