= The Tall Men =

The Tall Men can refer to:

- The Tall Men (film) (1955), starring Clark Gable
- "The Tall Men" (short story) (1941), by William Faulkner

== See also ==
- List of tallest people
- Ten Tall Men
