= Dollman =

Dollman or Dollmann may refer to:

- Doll Man, a fictional superhero
- Dollman (film), a 1991 science fiction film
- Eugen Dollmann (1900–1983) German diplomat and SS officer
- Friedrich Dollmann (1882–1944), German general during World War II
- Guy Dollman (1886–1942), a British zoologist and taxonomist
- John Charles Dollman (1851–1934), a British artist
- Phil Dollman (born 1985), Welsh rugby union player

== See also ==
- Dolman (disambiguation)
