= Tallman (surname) =

Tallman is a surname. Notable people with the surname include:

- Bob Tallman (born 1947), American rodeo announcer
- Charles Tallman (1900–1973), American football coach
- Chris Tallman (born 1970), American actor
- Frank Tallman (1919–1978), American stunt pilot
- Kenneth L. Tallman (1925–2006), United States Air Force general
- Patricia Tallman (born 1957), American actress
- Peleg Tallman (1764–1840), American politician
- Richard C. Tallman (born 1953), American judge
- Richard J. Tallman (1925–1972), U.S. Army general
- Thomas Tallman (1815–1872), American politician and minister from Connecticut
- Warren Tallman (1921–1994), American Canadian literary critic
- Will Tallman (21st century), American politician
