= John Carney (American football) =

American football player (born 1964)

- Carney with the New York Giants in 2008

No. 4, 3, 18, 1, 5
- Position: Kicker

Personal information
- Born: April 20, 1964 (age 62); Hartford, Connecticut, U.S.
- Listed height: 5 ft 11 in (1.80 m)
- Listed weight: 185 lb (84 kg)

Career information
- High school: Cardinal Newman (West Palm Beach, Florida)
- College: Notre Dame (1984–1986)
- NFL draft: 1987: undrafted

Career history
- Cincinnati Bengals (1987)*; Tampa Bay Buccaneers (1987–1989); San Diego Chargers (1990)*; Los Angeles Rams (1990); San Diego Chargers (1990–2000); New Orleans Saints (2001–2006); Jacksonville Jaguars (2007); Kansas City Chiefs (2007); New York Giants (2008); New Orleans Saints (2009–2010)
- * Offseason or practice squad member only

Awards and highlights
- Super Bowl champion (XLIV); First-team All-Pro (1994); Second-team All-Pro (2008); 2× Pro Bowl (1994, 2008); NFL scoring leader (1994); San Diego Chargers 40th Anniversary Team; San Diego Chargers 50th Anniversary Team; New Orleans Saints Hall of Fame

Career NFL statistics
- Field goals attempted: 580
- Field goals made: 478
- Field goal percentage: 82.4%
- Extra points attempted: 638
- Extra points made: 628
- Extra point percentage: 98.4%
- Points scored: 2,062
- Longest field goal: 54
- Stats at Pro Football Reference

John Michael Carney (born April 20, 1964) is an American former professional football player who was a kicker in the National Football League (NFL). He played college football for the Notre Dame Fighting Irish and was signed by the Cincinnati Bengals as an undrafted free agent in 1987.

Carney was also a member of the Tampa Bay Buccaneers, San Diego Chargers, New Orleans Saints, Los Angeles Rams, Jacksonville Jaguars, Kansas City Chiefs, and New York Giants. He was a Pro Bowl selection with the Chargers in 1994 and with the Giants in 2008. When he was released from the Saints' active roster in December 2009, Carney was third on the NFL career scoring list with a career total of 2,044 points. He was the last remaining player from the 1980s still active in professional football. He has also worked as a kicking consultant for the Saints.

== Early life ==
Carney attended Cardinal Newman High School in West Palm Beach, Florida, and lettered in football. In football, he won All-State honors as a punter.

== College career ==
Carney attended the University of Notre Dame and played football for the Fighting Irish from 1984 to 1986. He was named to Notre Dame's all-time team by Sports Illustrated.

== Professional career ==
=== Cincinnati Bengals ===
After going undrafted in the 1987 NFL draft, Carney was signed by the Cincinnati Bengals as an undrafted free agent. He was released prior to the regular season and spent the year out of football.

=== Tampa Bay Buccaneers ===
Carney played five games for the Tampa Bay Buccaneers between 1988 and 1989. He converted two of five field goal attempts and all six extra point attempts. At the time of his retirement, he was the last active player to wear the Buccaneers orange uniform scheme.

=== San Diego Chargers (first stint) ===
Carney attended training camp with the San Diego Chargers in 1990, but did not make the final roster.

=== Los Angeles Rams ===
Carney played one game for the Los Angeles Rams in 1990, but did not attempt a field goal or extra point. He was the last remaining active Los Angeles Ram, until the team moved back to Los Angeles from St. Louis in 2016.

=== San Diego Chargers (second stint) ===
Carney was re-signed by the Chargers during the 1990 season, appearing in 12 games for the team and converting 19 of 21 field goal attempts. He played 11 seasons with the Chargers through the 2000 season, earning his first Pro Bowl selection in 1994 after going 34-for-38 (89.5 percent) on field goal attempts as the Chargers made it to the Super Bowl. To this day, he remains the Chargers' all-time leading scorer.

=== New Orleans Saints (first stint) ===
Carney signed with the New Orleans Saints as a free agent prior to the 2001 season.

On December 21, 2003, the Saints were trailing the Jaguars 20–13 with 7 seconds left in regulation. Quarterback Aaron Brooks threw the ball in a hurry to Donte Stallworth. As time expired, the Saints continued to lateral the ball around until wide receiver Jerome Pathon eventually scored a touchdown in what became known as the River City Relay. Carney was sent out to kick the extra point to tie the game up and force overtime. Instead, Carney pushed the ball wide right and the Saints lost 19–20. The loss would eliminate the Saints from playoff contention.

Carney kicked a game-winning field goal against the Carolina Panthers following Hurricane Katrina. He then appeared on the cover of Sports Illustrated with quarterback Aaron Brooks on September 19, 2005, as the city celebrated this victory.

On April 5, 2007, Carney asked and was given permission to leave the Saints after their acquisition of kicker Olindo Mare.

=== Jacksonville Jaguars ===
Following Week 1 of the 2007 NFL season, Carney signed with the Jacksonville Jaguars replacing injured placekicker Josh Scobee. Carney appeared in eight games for the Jaguars in Scobee's absence, converting nine of 11 field goal attempts and 20 of 21 extra point attempts. He was released on November 19 upon Scobee's return.

=== Kansas City Chiefs ===
On November 26, 2007, the Kansas City Star reported that the Kansas City Chiefs would sign Carney after holding tryouts to replace Dave Rayner – making Carney the fourth placekicker to play for the Chiefs within a one-year period, following Lawrence Tynes, Justin Medlock and Rayner. Carney appeared in five games for the Chiefs, going 3-for-3 on field goal attempts and 7-for-7 on extra point attempts.

=== New York Giants ===
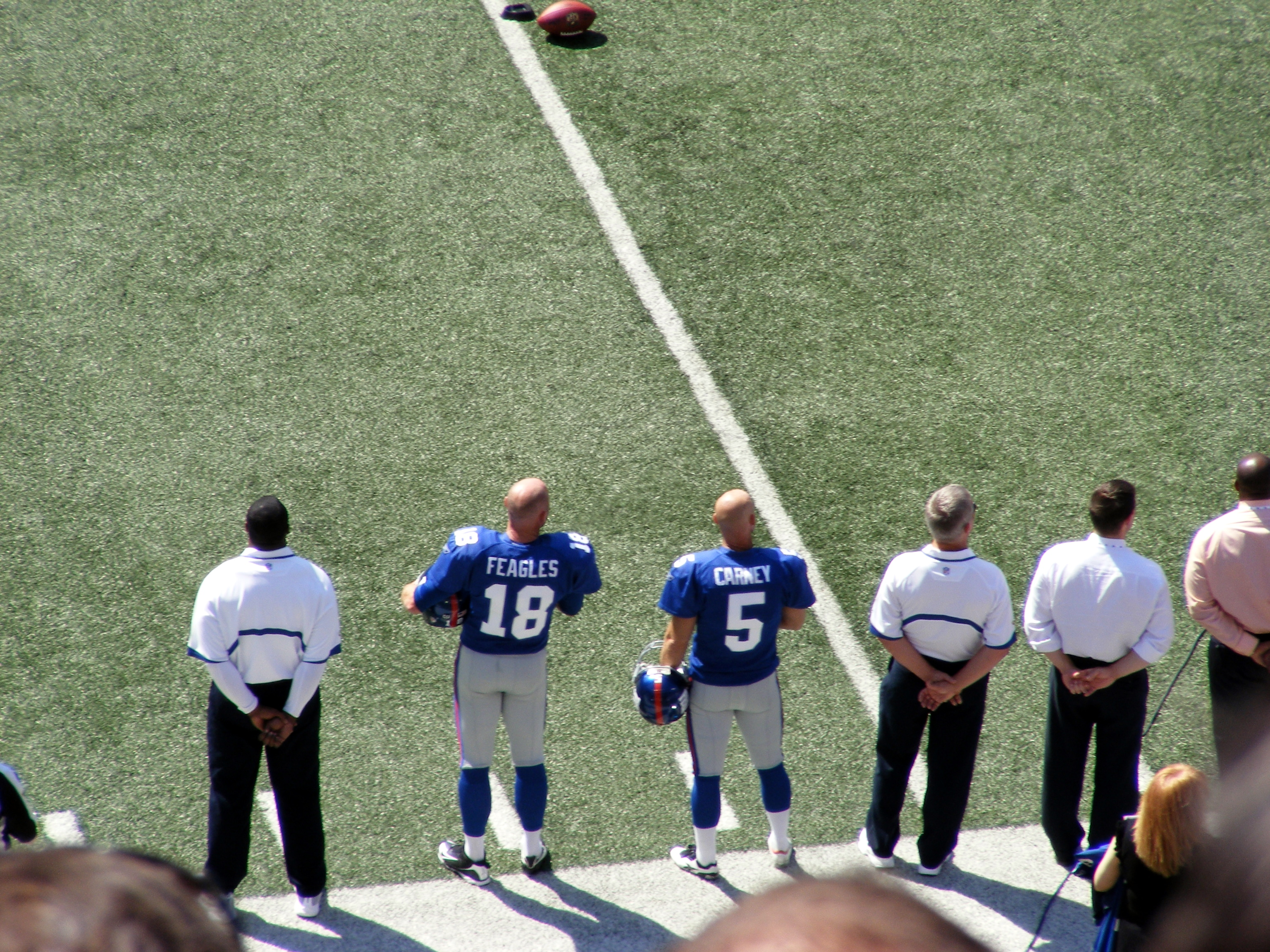
Carney with Jeff Feagles in 2008; in their 40s both were kickers for the New York Giants.

On August 30, 2008, Carney signed with the New York Giants to fill in while Tynes recovered from a knee injury sustained in training camp. Although Tynes would eventually recover from his injury Carney continued to hold on to the starting position and Tynes was relegated to kickoff duties. At age 44, Carney was the oldest active NFL player during the 2008 season.

After a near perfect season (35-for-38 on field goal attempts with two blocked), Carney was chosen as the starting kicker for the NFC for the 2009 Pro Bowl. Carney was not re-signed after his contract expired, leaving him a free agent entering the 2009 season.

=== New Orleans Saints (second stint) ===
Following the announcement that New Orleans Saints placekicker Garrett Hartley would be suspended for the first four games of the 2009 season, Carney returned to New Orleans on August 15 on a one-year contract. With his start on November 30, he became the sixth player in NFL history to reach 300 career games. Carney was waived on December 22, two weeks after Hartley regained the starting job.

On December 24, 2009, the Saints announced that Carney had been hired as a "kicking consultant", with responsibility for the snap and hold as well as working on kicking with his successor, Hartley. The appointment meant that Carney was ineligible to kick for any team for the rest of the 2009 season. Carney remained with the Saints in this capacity through the playoffs, and received credit for his role in preparing the comparatively inexperienced Hartley to make a number of critical kicks that helped the Saints win their first Super Bowl.

Carney started the 2010 season without a team. However, after Hartley missed 3 out of 7 field goal attempts during the Saints' first 3 games, including a short kick in overtime that would have won a game against the Atlanta Falcons, the Saints re-signed Carney (while also retaining Hartley) on September 28, 2010. The signing made him the oldest active player in the NFL at the age of 46. On October 3, 2010, he kicked three field goals in a Saints win against the Carolina Panthers, and became the third oldest player to play in an NFL game (behind only George Blanda and Morten Andersen). On October 12, the Saints released Carney for the third time. Carney would not sign with another NFL team. He became the third NFL player after George Blanda and Jeff Feagles to play across four different decades.

== NFL career statistics ==
Legend
	Won the Super Bowl
	Led the league
**Bold**	Career high

Year	Team	GP	Field goals										PATs			Pts
Year	Team	GP	FGM	FGA	FG%	<20	20−29	30−39	40−49	50+	LNG	BLK	XPM	XPA	XP%	Pts
1988	TB	4	2	5	40.0	0–0	2–3	0–1	0–1	0–0	29	0	6	6	**100.0**	12
1989	TB	1	0	0	0.0	0–0	0–0	0–0	0–0	0–0	0	0	0	0	0.0	0
1990	LAR	1	0	0	0.0	0–0	0–0	0–0	0–0	0–0	0	0	0	0	0.0	0
1990	SD	12	19	21	90.5	**2–2**	8–8	6–7	3–3	0–1	43	0	27	28	96.4	84
1991	SD	16	19	29	65.5	1–1	6–6	6–8	4–10	2–4	**54**	1	31	31	**100.0**	88
1992	SD	16	26	32	81.3	0–0	13–14	5–7	7–8	1–3	50	2	35	35	**100.0**	113
1993	SD	16	31	**40**	77.5	1–1	7–7	14–17	7–12	2–3	51	**3**	31	33	93.9	124
1994	SD	16	34	38	89.5	0–0	12–12	**15–15**	5–9	2–2	50	0	33	33	**100.0**	135
1995	SD	16	21	26	80.8	0–0	8–8	10–11	3–5	0–2	45	1	32	33	97.0	95
1996	SD	16	29	36	80.6	0–0	11–13	8–8	7–12	**3–3**	53	1	31	31	**100.0**	118
1997	SD	4	7	7	**100.0**	0–0	3–3	2–2	2–2	0–0	41	0	5	5	**100.0**	26
1998	SD	16	26	30	86.7	0–0	11–12	5–5	8–10	2–3	**54**	0	19	19	**100.0**	97
1999	SD	16	31	36	86.1	**2–2**	13–13	6–8	9–12	1–1	50	2	22	23	95.7	115
2000	SD	16	18	25	72.0	1–1	3–3	5–7	7–10	2–4	**54**	2	27	27	**100.0**	81
2001	NO	15	27	31	87.1	0–0	7–7	11–11	8–12	1–1	50	2	32	32	**100.0**	113
2002	NO	16	31	35	88.6	0–0	9–9	11–13	**11–12**	0–1	48	0	37	37	**100.0**	130
2003	NO	16	22	30	73.3	0–0	6–6	10–12	5–9	1–3	50	1	36	37	97.3	102
2004	NO	16	22	27	81.5	0–0	3–3	12–15	5–6	2–3	53	1	38	38	**100.0**	104
2005	NO	16	25	32	78.1	1–1	12–13	4–6	8–12	0–0	49	2	22	22	**100.0**	97
2006	NO	16	23	25	92.0	1–1	9–9	7–8	5–6	1–1	51	1	46	47	97.9	115
2007	JAX	8	9	11	81.8	**2–2**	3–3	3–3	1–3	0–0	41	1	20	21	95.2	47
2007	KC	5	3	3	**100.0**	0–0	0–0	2–2	1–1	0–0	40	0	7	7	**100.0**	16
2008	NYG	15	**35**	38	92.1	0–0	**15–15**	14–15	5–7	1–1	51	2	38	38	**100.0**	**143**
2009	NO	11	13	17	76.5	0–0	6–6	5–8	2–3	0–0	46	2	**50**	**52**	96.2	89
2010	NO	2	5	6	83.3	0–0	1–2	4–4	0–0	0–0	32	0	3	3	**100.0**	18
Career		302	478	580	82.4	11–11	168–175	165–193	113–165	21–36	54	24	628	638	98.4	2,062

=== NFL records ===
- Most games with 6 or more field goals in a career: 2 – tied with Gary Anderson, Jeff Wilkins, and Jim Bakken
- Most games with 6 or more field goals in a season (1993): 2
- Most games with 5 or more field goals in a career: 11
- Most games with 4 or more field goals in a career: 29
- Most decades played: 4 (1980s, 1990s, 2000s, 2010s) – tied with George Blanda

== Personal life ==
Carney has been married to producer Holly Carney for 28 years. They share three children, Luke Carney, JD Carney and Keely Carney. Both JD and Keely attended Carney's alma mater The University of Notre Dame. Carney runs a pre-season kicking training camp in San Diego for professional kickers called "The Launching Pad".

The Carney family are devout Catholics.
