= Talman Gardner =

American gridiron football player (born 1980)

No. 88, 83
- Position: Wide receiver

Personal information
- Born: March 10, 1980 (age 46); New Orleans, Louisiana, U.S.
- Listed height: 6 ft 1 in (1.85 m)
- Listed weight: 205 lb (93 kg)

Career information
- High school: McDonogh 35 (New Orleans)
- College: Florida State
- NFL draft: 2003: 7th round, 231st overall pick

Career history
- New Orleans Saints (2003–2004); Hamilton Tiger-Cats (2006)*; Kansas City Brigade (2007)*; Hamilton Tiger-Cats (2007)
- * Offseason or practice squad member only

Awards and highlights
- BCS national champion (1999)

Career NFL statistics
- Receptions: 4
- Receiving yards: 52
- Stats at Pro Football Reference

Talman J. Gardner (born March 10, 1980) is an American former professional football player who was a wide receiver in the National Football League (NFL) and Canadian Football League (CFL). He was selected by the New Orleans Saints in the seventh round of the 2003 NFL draft. He played college football for the Florida State Seminoles.

== Early life ==
Gardner played high school football at McDonogh 35 High School in New Orleans, Louisiana.

== College career ==
Gardner played college football for the Florida State Seminoles from 1999 to 2002. He caught 33 passes for 649 yards and 11 touchdowns in 2001, earning honorable mention All-Atlantic Coast Conference honors. He recorded 38 receptions for 625 yards and eight touchdowns in 2002. Overall, he totaled 90 receptions for 1,595 yards and 19 touchdowns during his college career.

== Professional career ==
=== New Orleans Saints ===
Gardner was selected by the New Orleans Saints in the seventh round, with the 231st overall pick, of the 2003 NFL draft. He officially signed with the team on July 25, 2003. He was waived on August 31 and signed to the team's practice squad on September 2. Gardner was promoted to the active roster on October 4 and played in 10 games, starting one, for the Saints during the 2003 season. He caught three passes for 29 yards and recorded two solo tackles.

Gardner played in 11 games, starting one, in 2004, recording one reception for 23 yards and nine solo tackles. He re-signed with the Saints on March 18, 2005. He was waived on September 2, 2005.

=== Hamilton Tiger-Cats (first stint) ===
Gardner signed with the Hamilton Tiger-Cats of the Canadian Football League on February 1, 2006. He requested his release after the Tiger-Cats wanted to place him on the practice roster to start the season.

=== Kansas City Brigade ===
Gardner was signed by the Kansas City Brigade of the Arena Football League on October 17, 2006. He was waived on February 5, 2007.

=== Hamilton Tiger-Cats (second stint) ===
Gardner signed with the Tiger-Cats on March 20, 2007. He played in seven games for the Tiger-Cats in 2007, catching 18 passes for 276 yards and one touchdown. He also recorded one tackle and lost one fumble.
