= Tillman =

Tillman is a surname and given name of English origin and an Americanized spelling of Tillmann. Other variants of the name include Tilman and Dillman. Notable people with the name Tillmann include:

== Surname ==
- Albert Tillman (1928–2004), American educator, underwater diver, and author
- Alex Tillman (born 1991), Canadian football player
- Andre Tillman (born 1952), American football player
- Andy Tillman (born 1952), American llama rancher, businessman, and author from Oregon
- Barrett Tillman (born 1948), military historian and author
- Benjamin Tillman (1847–1918), American politician from South Carolina
- Bob Tillman (1937–2000), American baseball player
- Cedric Tillman (disambiguation), multiple people
- Charles Davis Tillman (1861–1943), gospel musician
- Charles Tillman (born 1981), American football player
- Chris Tillman (born 1988), American baseball pitcher
- Darryl Tillman (born 1967), American football player
- Dick Tillman (1936–2020), American sailor
- Dorothy Tillman (born 1947), American politician and civil rights activist
- Emma Tillman (1892–2007), American supercentenarian
- Eric Tillman (born 1957), Canadian football manager
- George D. Tillman (1826–1902), American politician from South Carolina, brother of Benjamin
- Georgeanna Tillman (1944–1980), American singer
- Harold Tillman (born 1945), English retail entrepreneur and investor
- Harrel Tillman (1925–1998), American actor, lawyer and judge
- Henry Tillman (born 1960), American boxer
- James Tillman (disambiguation)
  - James Calvin Tillman, American former prisoner, exonerated of the crime for which he was imprisoned
  - James D. Tillman (1841–1916), American Treasury official and politician
  - James Fount Tillman (1854–1899), American diplomat and politician
  - James H. Tillman (1869–1911), American politician from South Carolina
  - James Tillman (baseball) (1919–2009), American baseball player
- Jerome Tillman (born 1987), American basketball player
- Jerry W. Tillman (1940–2023), American politician
- John Tillman (disambiguation)
  - John N. Tillman (1859–1929), American politician from Arkansas
  - John T. Tilman (1845–1905), American politician from Virginia
  - John Tillman (athlete) (born 1965), American triple jumper
  - John Tillman (lacrosse) (born c. 1970), American lacrosse coach
  - John Tillman (policy), American nonprofit executive
  - John Tillman Lamkin (1811–1870), American politician
- Johnny Tillman (1893–1964), American baseball player
- Josh Tillman (born 1981), American singer-songwriter
- Juliann Jane Tillman, American preacher
- Justin Tillman (born 1996), American basketball player
- Katherine D. Tillman (1870–1923), American writer
- Larry Tillman (fl. 1934–1950), an American wrestler and promoter
- Lewis Tillman (1816–1886), American politician
- Lucy Dugas Tillman, South Carolina mother, important for women's rights
- Lynne Tillman (born 1947), novelist, short story writer, and cultural critic
- Malik Tillman (born 2002), German-American footballer, brother of Timothy
- Martin Tillman (born 1964), Swiss cellist and composer
- Mary Tillman Smith (1904–1995), American artist
- Nancy Tillman (born 1954), American author and illustrator
- Ontario Tillman, American politician from Alabama
- Pat Tillman (1976–2004), American football player and soldier
- Paula Gately Tillman (born 1946), American photographer
- Pete Tillman (1922–1998), American football coach
- Richard J. Tillman (1911–1983), American politician
- Rusty Tillman (1946–2021), American football player
- Samuel Escue Tillman (1847–1942), American military educator and author
- Spencer Tillman (born 1964), American football player
- Thore Tillman (1915–2004), Swedish athlete
- Timothy Tillman (born 1999), German-American footballer, brother of Malik
- Tony Tillman (born 1981), American musician
- Tramell Tillman (born 1985), American actor
- Travares Tillman (born 1977), American football player
- Wheeler Mellette Tillman (born 1941), American politician
- William Tillman (1830s–?), American mariner
- Xavier Tillman (born 1999), American basketball player

== Given name ==
- Tillman D. Johnson (1858–1953), American jurist from Utah
- Tillman Sease (1916–1988), American football and baseball coach

== See also ==
- Tillmann, given name and surname
- Tilman, given name and surname
