= Tylman =

Given name/surname list

Tylman is a given name and surname. Notable people with the name include:

Surname:

- Richard Tylman of Faversham, English food commodity dealer and exporter
- Stanley D. Tylman (1893–1982), professor of dentistry (1920–1962), University of Illinois at Chicago College of Dentistry

Given name:

- Tylman van Gameren (1632–1706), Dutch-born Polish architect and engineer who settled in Poland and worked for Queen Maria Kazimiera
- Tylman Susato (1510–1570), Renaissance composer, instrumentalist and publisher of music in Antwerp

== See also ==
- Tielman
- Tilleman
- Tillemann
- Tillman
- Tillmann
- Tilman
- Tilmann
- Tyman
