= Tielemans =

Tielemans (pronounced [ˈtiləmɑns]) is a Dutch patronymic surname. Tieleman is a primarily archaic Dutch given name that could be of West Frisian origin or a nickname of Theodorus. It had many spellings (e.g. Thielman, Tielman, Tilman, Tylman) and variations on the patronym include Thieleman, Thielemans, Tieleman, Thielemann, Thielman, Tielman, Tilleman and Tillemans. People with these surnames include:

== Surname ==
=== Thielemans ===
- Freddy Thielemans (1944–2022), Belgian politician
- Pierre Thielemans (1825–1898), Belgian composer, conductor and organist
- Toots Thielemans (1922–2016), Belgian jazz musician known for his harmonica playing and whistling

=== Tieleman ===
- Bill Tieleman (born 1957), Canadian political columnist
- Laurence Tieleman (born 1972), Belgian-Italian tennis player

=== Tielemans ===
- Jean-François Tielemans (1799–1887), Belgian lawyer and politician
- Mathijs Tielemans (born 2002), Dutch footballer
- Olivier Tielemans (born 1984), Dutch race car driver
- Remko Tielemans (born 1980), Dutch bass guitarist, artist and designer
- Youri Tielemans (born 1997), Belgian footballer

== Given name ==
=== Thieleman ===
- Thieleman J. van Braght (1625–1664), Dutch Anabaptist author

=== Tieleman ===
- Jan Tieleman Jacobus Cremer (1795–1832), Dutch colonial administrator
- Tieleman Roosterman (1598–1673), Dutch cloth merchant painted by Frans Hals
- Tieleman Franciscus Suys (1783–1864), Flemish architect
- Tieleman Vuurman (1899–1991), Dutch sports shooter.
