= Tillman (disambiguation) =

Tillman is a given name and surname.

Tillman may also refer to:

== Places in the United States ==
- Tillman, Florida
- Tillman, Indiana
- Tillman, Missouri
- Tillman, South Carolina
- Tillman County, Oklahoma

== Other uses ==
- Tillman (dog), a skateboarding dog
- USS Tillman
  - USS Tillman (DD-135), a Wickes-class destroyer
  - USS Tillman (DD-641), a Gleaves-class destroyer
- Tillman battleships, the Maximum battleship design proposed by Senator Benjamin Tillman

== See also ==
- Dillman (disambiguation)
