= Nationwide opinion polling for the 2028 Democratic Party presidential primaries =

This is a list of nationwide public opinion polls that were conducted relating to the Democratic primaries for the 2028 United States presidential election. The persons named in the polls are candidates who have expressed interest or have received media speculation about their possible candidacy.

== Polling aggregation ==
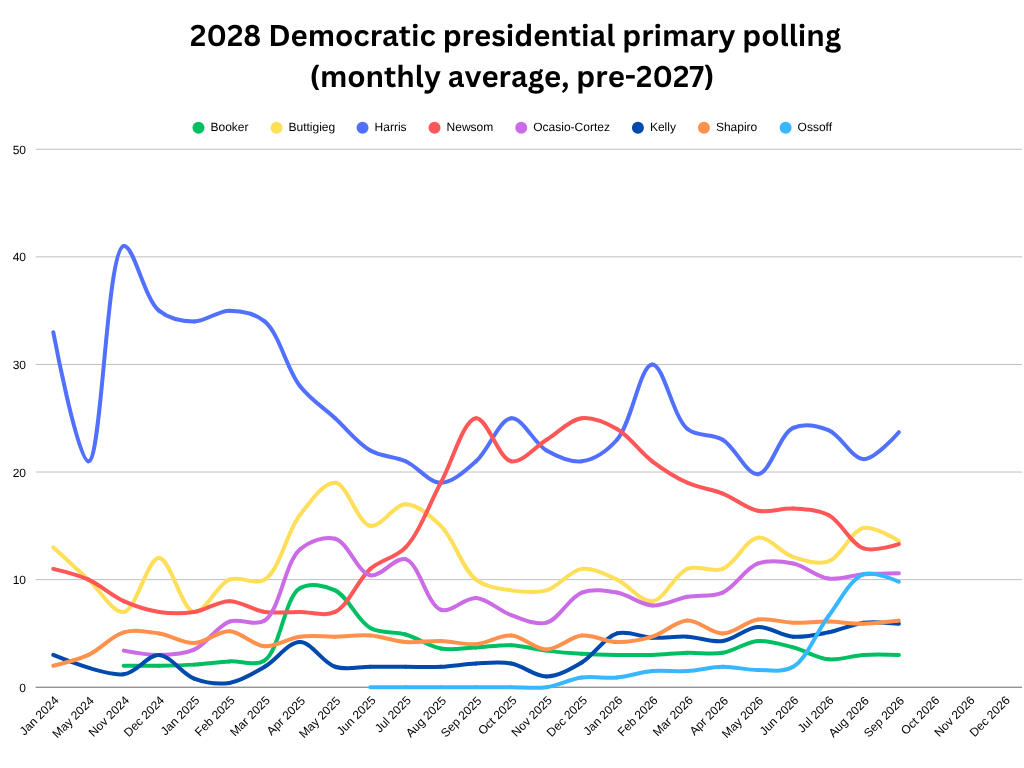
Monthly average of nationwide polling

Aggregator	Updated	Kamala Harris	Cory Booker	Pete Buttigieg	Mark Kelly	Gavin Newsom	Alexandria Ocasio-Cortez	Jon Ossoff	JB Pritzker	Josh Shapiro	Other	Lead
270toWin	November 6, 2026	30.3%	3.5%	10.0%	7.0%	14.3%	9.0%	7.0%	3.0%	5.0%	10.0% (Note: Andy Beshear with 2%, Stephen A. Smith with 2%, Gretchen Whitmer with 2%, Wes Moore with 1%, Chris Van Hollen with 1%, Raphael Warnock with 1%, Rahm Emanuel with 0.5%, Jared Polis with 0.5%)	Harris +16.0%
RealClearPolling	November 20, 2026	16.5%	2.0%	14.0%	5.5%	11.3%	14.0%	15.0%	3.0%	3.5%	4.0% (Note: Andy Beshear with 4%)	Harris +1.5%
Aggregate		23.4%	2.8%	12.0%	6.3%	12.8%	11.5%	11.0%	3.0%	4.3%	—	Harris +10.6%

== 2026 ==
Poll source	Date(s) administered	Sample size (Note: Key: A – all adults RV – registered voters LV – likely voters V – unclear)	Andy Beshear	Cory Booker	Pete Buttigieg	Kamala Harris	Mark Kelly	Gavin Newsom	Alexandria Ocasio-Cortez	Jon Ossoff	JB Pritzker	Josh Shapiro	Other	Undecided
Emerson College	November 14–16, 2026	499 (RV)	4% (Note: Open-ended survey question)	0.6%	6%	6.1%	2.6%	8.4%	12.1%	16.5%	1.2%	2%	21.3% (Note: James Talarico with 1.1%, Abdul El-Sayed with 0.8%, Barack Obama with 0.4, Hakeem Jeffries with 0.3%, Bernie Sanders with 0.2%, Wes Moore with 0.2%, "Other" with 18.3%)	19.2%
Emerson College	November 14–16, 2026	499 (RV)	6.5% (Note: Closed-ended survey question)	—	13.8%	15.5%	4.2%	11.3%	15%	17%	3.4%	2.6%	2.7% (Note: Ro Khanna with 0.4%, Rahm Emanuel with 0.2%, "Someone else" with 2.1%)	8%
Echelon Insights	November 12–16, 2026	531 (LV)	2%	2%	15%	19%	5%	11%	10%	10%	3%	4%	5% (Note: Gretchen Whitmer with 2%, Ro Khanna with 1%, Raphael Warnock with 1%, "Someone else" with 1%)	13%
Strength in Numbers/Verasight	November 11–13, 2026	726 (A)	1%	—	15%	18%	—	10%	17%	12%	3%	4%	5% (Note: Ro Khanna with 1%, Wes Moore with 1%, Raphael Warnock with 1%, "None of them" with 2%)	15%
Rainey Center	November 8–12, 2026	518 (LV)	5%	3%	8%	17%	4%	16%	6%	10%	3%	7%	12% (Note: James Talarico with 6%, Wes Moore with 1%, Gretchen Whitmer with 1%, Raphael Warnock with 1%, Rahm Emanuel with 1%, Mark Cuban with 1%, Stephen A. Smith with 1%, Ruben Gallego with 0%, Chris Murphy with 0%, Ro Khanna with 0%, Amy Klobuchar with 0%, "Someone else" with 0%)	9%
Economist/YouGov	November 9–11, 2026	489 (A)	3%	2%	10%	20%	4%	13%	12%	15%	3%	3%	14% (Note: Bernie Sanders with 2%, Zohran Mamdani with 2%, James Talarico with 1%, Hillary Clinton with 1%, "Other" with 8%)	—
Cygnal	November 4-5, 2026	3,000 (RV) (Note: Sample size of full poll; Cygnal did not publish a separate sample size for the Democratic primary subsample)	3.6%	—	18.5%	13.6%	—	12.1%	17.9%	—	2.8%	6.4%	4% (Note: Wes Moore with 2.3%, Gretchen Whitmer with 1.5%, Abigail Spanberger with 0.2%)	21%
McLaughlin & Associates	October 30 – November 5, 2026	471 (LV)	3%	4%	9%	28%	5%	16%	9%	7%	3%	3%	5% (Note: Gretchen Whitmer with 2%, Wes Moore with 2%, Rahm Emanuel with 1%, Stephen A. Smith with 0%, Jared Polis with 0%)	10%
	November 3, 2026	2026 United States elections held.												
AtlasIntel	October 28 – November 1, 2026	3,566 (LV) (Note: Sample size of full poll; AtlasIntel did not publish a separate sample size for the Democratic primary subsample)	3.9%	1.5%	15.8%	12.6%	9.1%	9%	17.6%	18.2%	2.5%	3.4%	6.4% (Note: Raphael Warnock with 1.1%, Wes Moore with 1%, Ro Khanna with 0.7%, Tim Walz with 0.6%, Gretchen Whitmer with 0.4%; Rahm Emanuel with 0.3%, Stephen A. Smith with 0%, "None of the above" with 2.3%)	—
Harvard CAPS/Harris	October 24–26, 2026	2,700 (RV) (Note: Sample size of full poll; Harvard CAPS/Harris did not publish a separate sample size for the Democratic primary subsample)	2%	—	10%	34%	—	20%	11%	7%	4%	8%	3% (Note: "Someone else" with 3%)	—
Leger	October 23–25, 2026	375 (A)	2%	6%	8%	22%	7%	14%	7%	6%	2%	4%	4% (Note: James Talarico with 3%, Gretchen Whitmer with 1%, Amy Klobuchar with 1%, "Someone else" with 2%, "None of the above" with 5%)	10%
New York Times/Siena College	October 12–19, 2026	1,170 (LV)	1%	<1%	8%	11%	3%	11%	6%	5%	1%	2%	12% (Note: Bernie Sanders with 2%, Barack Obama with 1%, James Talarico with 1%, Zohran Mamdani with <1%, Michelle Obama with <1%, Abdul El-Sayed with <1%, Wes Moore with <1%, Hillary Clinton with <0.5%, Rahm Emanuel with <0.5%, Xavier Becerra with <0.5%, "Someone else" with 2%)	40%
Echelon Insights	October 15–19, 2026	522 (LV)	2%	3%	13%	19%	7%	14%	13%	5%	2%	4%	10% (Note: James Talarico with 4%, Raphael Warnock with 1%, Wes Moore with 1%, Gretchen Whitmer with 1%, Rahm Emanuel with 1%, Chris Murphy with 1%, "Someone else" with 1%)	7%
The Center Square/Noble Predictive Insights	October 5–7, 2026	1,171 (RV)	3%	3%	10%	29%	6%	14%	9%	—	3%	5%	5% (Note: Wes Moore with 1%, Amy Klobuchar with 1%, Chris Murphy with 1%, Ro Khanna with 1%, "Someone else" with 1%)	12%
Focaldata/Financial Times	October 2–5, 2026	778 (LV)	3%	—	9%	30%	5%	15%	9%	8%	—	5%	0% (Note: Rahm Emanuel with 0%, Ro Khanna with 0%)	14%
Harvard CAPS/Harris	September 26–28, 2026	2,200 (RV)	—	—	11%	38%	—	17%	12%	6%	5%	7%	4% (Note: "Someone else" with 4%)	—
McLaughlin & Associates	September 16–22, 2026	463 (LV)	—	4%	9%	29%	8%	12%	8%	—	2%	5%	7% (Note: Stephen A. Smith with 2%, Gretchen Whitmer with 2%, Jared Polis with 1%, Wes Moore with 1%, Rahm Emanuel with 1%)	15%
Echelon Insights	September 17–21, 2026	491 (LV)	2%	3%	10%	24%	7%	14%	7%	8%	2%	3%	6% (Note: Gretchen Whitmer with 2%, Raphael Warnock with 1%, Wes Moore with 1%, Chris Van Hollen with 1%, "Someone else" with 1%)	14%
Big Data Poll	September 13–15, 2026	1,329 (LV)	3.5%	—	10.3%	26.7%	5.4%	16.1%	10.3%	6.4%	—	5.5%	5.3% (Note: Gretchen Whitmer 2.5%, Stephen A. Smith 1.2%, Someone else 1.6%)	10.6%
Veteran Action/The Honest Poll	September 7–13, 2026	626 (LV)	—	—	13%	32%	—	21%	9%	6%	—	5%	4% (Note: "Someone else" with 4%)	10%
Liberal Currents/Center for Strategic Politics	September 3, 8–10, 2026	683 (RV)	3%	—	13%	25%	9%	15%	8%	10%	4%	6%	8% (Note: Shawn Fain with 1%, Ro Khanna with 1%, "Other" with 6%)	—
Focaldata/Financial Times	August 28 – September 2, 2026	614 (LV)	3%	—	9%	29%	6%	14%	11%	7%	—	8%	2% (Note: Rahm Emanuel with 1%, Ro Khanna with 1%)	12%
BGSU/YouGov	August 25 – September 1, 2026	566 (LV)	3%	4%	16%	17%	10%	14%	14%	—	2%	3%	26% (Note: Elizabeth Warren with 3%, Tim Walz with 2%, Amy Klobuchar with 1%, Gretchen Whitmer with 1%, Rahm Emanuel with 0%, "Someone else" with 9%)	–
Harvard CAPS/Harris	August 28–30, 2026	2,100 (RV)	—	—	9%	42%	—	18%	9%	7%	4%	7%	3% (Note: "Someone else" with 3%)	—
Morning Consult	August 28–30, 2026	—	—	—	9%	24%	—	12%	—	7%	—	—	—	—
Quantus Insights	August 26–28, 2026	515 (LV)	—	—	25.7%	8.1%	—	7.1%	15.3%	21.3%	—	—	3.1% (Note: "Someone else" with 1.1%, "Would not vote Democrat" with 2%)	19.4%
McLaughlin & Associates	August 18–24, 2026	474 (LV)	—	3%	10%	29%	7%	16%	9%	—	3%	6%	4% (Note: Gretchen Whitmer with 2%, Rahm Emanuel with 1%, Wes Moore with 1%, Jared Polis with 0%, Stephen A. Smith with 0%)	12%
Echelon Insights	August 13–17, 2026	483 (LV)	2%	3%	13%	18%	7%	12%	11%	5%	3%	6%	7% (Note: Gretchen Whitmer with 2%, Ro Khanna with 1%, Wes Moore with 1%, Raphael Warnock with 1%, John Fetterman with 1%, Abdul El-Sayed with 1%)	13%
The Center Square/Noble Predictive Insights	August 12-16, 2026	930 (RV)	3%	3%	12%	28%	5%	14%	7%	—	3%	5%	7% (Note: Chris Murphy with 2%, Wes Moore with 1%, Amy Klobuchar with 1%, Ro Khanna with 1%, "Someone else" with 2%)	15%
Focaldata/Financial Times	August 7–11, 2026	616 (LV)	1%	—	13%	26%	6%	15%	9%	5%	—	8%	2% (Note: Rahm Emanuel with 1%, Ro Khanna with 1%)	15%
Big Data Poll	July 26–29, 2026	1,338 (LV)	4.0%	—	7.4%	29.7%	5%	14.3%	8.6%	6.2%	—	6.5%	6.2% (Note: Gretchen Whitmer with 2.6%, Stephen A. Smith with 1.5%, Someone else with 2.1%)	12.3%
McLaughlin & Associates	July 15–21, 2026	472 (LV)	—	2%	8%	28%	7%	17%	10%	—	3%	4%	8% (Note: Gretchen with Whitmer 2%, Jared Polis with 2%, Stephen A. Smith with 2% Wes Moore with 1%, Rahm Emanuel with 1%)	14%
Daily Mail/J.L. Partners	July 17–20, 2026	516 (RV)	2%	3%	9%	31%	3%	14%	7%	4%	3%	5%	8% (Note: Tim Walz with 3%, Wes Moore with 2%, Gretchen Whitmer with 1%, Ro Khanna with 1%, Amy Klobuchar with 1%, John Fetterman with 0%, Ruben Gallego with 0%)	9%
Emerson College	July 19–20, 2026	574 (LV)	6.7%	—	18.8%	8.1%	—	16.9%	12.5%	12.6%	2.7%	5%	4% (Note: Ro Khanna with 1.5%, Someone else with 2.5%)	12.6%
Echelon Insights	July 9–13, 2026	496 (LV)	3%	2%	13%	21%	4%	14%	9%	3%	3%	7%	6% (Note: Gretchen Whitmer with 2%, Ro Khanna with 1%, Raphael Warnock with 1%, Wes Moore with 1%, John Fetterman with 1%)	14%
Harvard CAPS/Harris	July 11–12, 2026	1,776 (RV)	—	—	10%	37%	—	24%	9%	—	5%	9%	5% (Note: "Someone else" with 5%)	—
YouGov	July 8–10, 2026	485 (A)	2%	2%	9%	17%	3%	13%	10%	3%	3%	1%	17% (Note: Bernie Sanders with 7%, Elizabeth Warren with 3%, Tim Walz with 3%, Gretchen Whitmer with 1%, Amy Klobuchar with 1%, "Someone else" with 2%)	21%
Quantus Insights	July 3–7, 2026	503 (LV)	—	—	12.9%	35.3%	—	17.7%	11.1%	—	—	7.1%	16% (Note: "Someone else / undecided" with 16%)	—
Manhattan Institute	July 1–6, 2026	1,121 (LV) (Note: Sample size of full poll; Manhattan Institute did not publish a separate sample size for the Democratic primary subsample)	2%	3%	13%	19%	6%	15%	12%	3%	1%	4%	4% (Note: Jon Stewart with 1%, "Someone else" with 3%)	16%
Zogby Analytics	July 1–4, 2026	391 (LV)	—	—	9.2%	37.5%	5.9%	19.1%	12.3%	—	5.3%	7%	4% (Note: Ruben Gallego with 0.6%, "Someone else" with 3%)	—
Focaldata/Financial Times	June 26–30, 2026	755 (LV)	2%	—	8%	33%	5%	15%	9%	2%	3%	7%	1% (Note: Jon Stewart with 1%)	15%
Big Data Poll	June 26-28, 2026	1,256 (LV)	2.2%	—	9.5%	28.8%	6.4%	15.6%	8.3%	3.5%	—	6.9%	7.1% (Note: Gretchen Whitmer with 3.8%, Stephen A. Smith with 1.2%, "Someone else" with 2.1%)	11.7%
Daily Mail/J.L. Partners	June 24–26, 2026	1,040 (RV)	3%	4%	11%	29%	5%	15%	6%	2%	3%	4%	10% (Note: Tim Walz with 3%, Gretchen Whitmer with 2%, Amy Klobuchar with 1%, Ro Khanna with 1%, Wes Moore with 1%, John Fetterman with 0%, Ruben Gallego with 0%, "None of the above" with 2%)	9%
McLaughlin & Associates	June 17–23, 2026	464 (LV)	—	5%	8%	26%	3%	16%	9%	—	5%	5%	5% (Note: Wes Moore with 2%, Gretchen Whitmer with 2%, Rahm Emanuel with 1%, Stephen A. Smith with 0%, Jared Polis with 0%)	17%
Echelon Insights	June 11–14, 2026	515 (LV)	2%	3%	14%	20%	4%	14%	12%	2%	3%	6%	7% (Note: Gretchen Whitmer with 2%, Chris Murphy with 1%, John Fetterman with 1%, Wes Moore with 1%, Ro Khanna with 1%, "Someone else" with 1%)	14%
The Center Square/Noble Predictive Insights	June 1–4, 2026	1,013 (RV)	2%	—	11%	27%	—	14%	8%	—	2%	—	—	17%
Focaldata/Financial Times	May 29–June 1, 2026	646 (RV)	3%	—	8%	37%	5%	17%	7%	2%	2%	3%	1% (Note: Jon Stewart with 1%)	15%
Harvard CAPS/Harris	May 29–31, 2026	1,725 (RV)	—	—	—	44%	—	26%	8%	—	7%	10%	6% (Note: "Someone else" with 6%)	—
I&I/TIPP	May 26–28, 2026	593 (RV)	2%	4%	6%	31%	4%	14%	5%	1%	3%	6%	8% (Note: Tim Walz with 2%, Gretchen Whitmer with 2%, Wes Moore with 1%, John Fetterman with 1%, Raphael Warnock with 1%, Ro Khanna with 1%, "Someone else" with 0%)	18%
Emerson College	May 24–25, 2026	485 (LV)	8.5%	—	17.9%	9.9%	—	15.9%	11.1%	—	4.4%	10%	4.8% (Note: Ro Khanna with 1%, "Someone else" with 3.8%)	17.5%
Overton Insights	May 16–20, 2026	1,337 (LV) (Note: Sample size of full poll; Overton Insights did not publish a separate sample size for the Democratic primary subsample)	3%	7%	16%	9%	4%	13%	12%	—	1%	8%	13% (Note: Bernie Sanders with 9%, Wes Moore with 2%, Gretchen Whitmer with 0%, "Someone else" with 2%)	14%
Echelon Insights	May 14–18, 2026	501 (LV)	2%	3%	10%	23%	6%	17%	11%	1%	4%	5%	9% (Note: Gretchen Whitmer with 4%, Wes Moore with 1%, Ro Khanna with 1%, Raphael Warnock with 1%, John Fetterman with 1%, "Someone else" with 1%)	—
McLaughlin & Associates	May 12–18, 2026	459 (LV)	—	5%	9%	28%	—	16%	7%	—	2%	6%	12% (Note: Gretchen Whitmer with 2%, Tim Walz with 2%, Rahm Emanuel with 2%, Roy Cooper with 2%, Amy Klobuchar with 1%, Stephen A. Smith with 1%, Phil Murphy with 1%, Wes Moore with 1%, Jared Polis with 0%)	18%
Lake Research Partners	May 6–11, 2026	800 (LV)	3%	5%	16%	26%	8%	17%	10%	—	4%	7%	4% (Note: Gretchen Whitmer with 3%, Rahm Emanuel with 1%, Ruben Gallego with 0%, Ro Khanna with 0%)	—
AtlasIntel	May 4–7, 2026	2,069 (A)	4.1%	3.9%	22.4%	12.9%	—	21.2%	26%	—	—	2.4%	7.1% (Note: Gretchen Whitmer with 1.1%, Tim Walz with 1%, Ro Khanna with 0.9%, Rahm Emanuel with 0.6%, Wes Moore with 0.4%, Raphael Warnock with 0%, "None of the above" with 3.1%)	—
Focaldata/Financial Times	May 1–5, 2026	1,339 (LV)	2%	—	9%	38%	6%	16%	9%	1%	3%	5%	1% (Note: Jon Stewart with 1%)	10%
Harvard CAPS/Harris	April 23–26, 2026	2,745 (RV)	—	—	—	50%	—	22%	8%	—	6%	9%	5% (Note: "Someone else" with 5%)	—
Verasight	April 21–23, 2026	864 (A)	—	4%	12%	22%	6%	15%	13%	—	2%	4%	15% (Note: Bernie Sanders with 11%, Amy Klobuchar with 2%, Gretchen Whitmer with 1%, "Someone else" with 1%)	5%
Echelon Insights	April 17–20, 2026	525 (LV)	2%	4%	12%	22%	3%	21%	10%	2%	3%	5%	9% (Note: Gretchen Whitmer with 2%, Wes Moore with 1%, Ro Khanna with 1%, Raphael Warnock with 1%, "Someone else" with 2%)	10%
McLaughlin & Associates	April 8–15, 2026	457 (LV)	—	4%	10%	29%	—	15%	4%	—	3%	4%	17% (Note: Gretchen Whitmer with 4%, Roy Cooper with 3%, Tim Walz with 2%, Wes Moore with 2%, Stephen A. Smith with 2%, Rahm Emanuel with 1%, Amy Klobuchar with 1%, Jared Polis with 1%, Phil Murphy with 1%)	16%
YouGov	April 8–13, 2026	968 (A)	2%	2%	9%	24%	5%	12%	9%	—	3%	4%	15% (Note: Bernie Sanders with 7%, Elizabeth Warren with 3%, Tim Walz with 1%, Gretchen Whitmer with 1%, Amy Klobuchar with 1%, "Someone else" with 2%)	17%
Harvard CAPS/Harris	March 25–26, 2026	2,009 (RV)	—	—	—	41%	—	26%	8%	—	7%	10%	6% (Note: "Someone else" with 6%)	—
Daily Mail/J.L. Partners	March 18–20, 2026	541 (LV)	—	—	10%	22%	—	19%	7%	—	—	8%	—	10%
Echelon Insights	March 12–16, 2026	513 (LV)	3%	4%	9%	21%	4%	19%	11%	1%	2%	5%	10% (Note: Wes Moore with 2%, Raphael Warnock with 2%, Gretchen Whitmer with 2%, Chris Murphy with 1%, Ro Khanna with 1%, Jared Polis with 1%, John Fetterman with 1%)	12%
Focaldata	March 6–10, 2026	672 (LV)	2%	—	8%	39%	4%	22%	11%	2%	4%	6%	2% (Note: Jon Stewart with 2%)	—
McLaughlin & Associates	March 4–9, 2026	456 (LV)	—	2%	9%	20%	—	19%	11%	—	2%	5%	16% (Note: Jasmine Crockett with 3%, Amy Klobuchar with 3%, Gretchen Whitmer with 3%, Tim Walz with 2%, Stephen A. Smith with 1%, Rahm Emanuel with 1%, Roy Cooper with 1%, Phil Murphy with 1%, Wes Moore with 1%, Jared Polis with 0%)	18%
Yale Youth Poll	March 3–9, 2026	1,754 (RV)	2.4%	2.2%	13.9%	19.7%	6.7%	19.1%	12.7%	1.4%	3.5%	3.5%	14.9% (Note: Gretchen Whitmer with 2%, Tim Walz with 1.8%, Mark Cuban with 1.5%, Raphael Warnock with 1.1%, Chris Murphy with 1%, Wes Moore with 0.9%, Jared Polis with 0.9%, Abigail Spanberger with 0.6%, Ruben Gallego with 0.2%, Rahm Emanuel with 0%, "Other" with 4.9%)	—
The Center Square/Noble Predictive Insights	March 2–5, 2026	1,152 (RV)	2%	3%	7%	31%	4%	16%	6%	—	2%	5%	12% (Note: Amy Klobuchar with 2%, Wes Moore with 1%, Chris Murphy with 0%, Ro Khanna with 0%, "Someone else" with 2%)	18%
Daily Mail/J.L. Partners	February 25–27, 2026	1,095 (RV)	2%	5%	10%	23%	5%	19%	7%	1%	4%	5%	7% (Note: Gretchen Whitmer with 3%, Tim Walz with 2%, Amy Klobuchar with 1%, John Fetterman with 0%, Ro Khanna with 0%, Ruben Gallego with 0%, Wes Moore with 0%, "None of the above" with 1%)	10%
Harvard CAPS/Harris	February 25–26, 2026	1,999 (RV)	—	—	—	39%	—	24%	14%	—	6%	10%	7% (Note: "Someone else" with 7%)	—
Echelon Insights	February 19–23, 2026	498 (LV)	2%	3%	8%	18%	4%	24%	9%	1%	4%	4%	8% (Note: Gretchen Whitmer with 2%, Wes Moore with 1%, John Fetterman with 1%, Chris Murphy with 1%, Jared Polis with 1%, Raphael Warnock with 1%, Stephen A. Smith with 1%)	15%
Emerson College	February 21–22, 2026	438 (LV)	5.1%	—	15.7%	12.8%	—	19.6%	9.1%	—	2.7%	7%	4.6% (Note: Gretchen Whitmer with 2.4%, "Someone else" with 2.2%)	23.5%
BGSU/YouGov	February 13–18, 2026	556 (RV)	3%	2%	11%	18%	7%	21%	11%	—	6%	3%	18% (Note: Elizabeth Warren with 4%, Tim Walz with 3%, Gretchen Whitmer with 2%, Amy Klobuchar with 1%, Phil Murphy with 1%, Rahm Emanuel with 0%, "Someone else with 7%")	—
Manhattan Institute	February 6–15, 2026	1,782 (LV)	2%	2%	8%	23%	4%	20%	7%	1%	2%	5%	10% (Note: Jon Stewart with 2%, Gretchen Whitmer with 2%, Mark Cuban with 1%, Wes Moore with 1%, Ro Khanna with 1%, Chris Murphy with 1%, Ruben Gallego with 0%, Stephen A. Smith with 0%, Rahm Emanuel with 0%, "Someone else" with 2%)	15%
Yahoo/YouGov	February 9–12, 2026	1,704 (RV)	—	3%	13%	18%	9%	19%	12%	—	6%	—	3% (Note: Tim Walz 3%)	19%
Focaldata	February 10, 2026	438 (LV)	1%	—	7%	39%	6%	21%	10%	1%	3%	7%	4% (Note: Gretchen Whitmer with 4%)	—
Harvard CAPS/Harris	January 28–29, 2026	2,000 (RV)	—	—	—	39%	—	30%	12%	—	7%	9%	4% (Note: "Someone else" with 4%)	—
I&I/TIPP	January 27–29, 2026	527 (RV)	2%	—	5%	38%	3%	13%	2%	2%	3%	4%	10% (Note: Tim Walz with 3%, Gretchen Whitmer with 2%, Wes Moore with 1%, "Someone else" with 4%)	18%
McLaughlin & Associates	January 21–27, 2026	455 (LV)	—	3%	8%	27%	—	14%	7%	—	2%	4%	17% (Note: Jasmine Crockett with 4%, Tim Walz with 3%, Gretchen Whitmer with 2%, Roy Cooper with 2%, Amy Klobuchar with 1%, Wes Moore with 1%, Jared Polis with 1%, Stephen A. Smith with 1%, Phil Murphy with 1%, Rahm Emanuel with 1%)	18%
Focaldata	January 23–26, 2026	791 (LV)	2%	—	9%	40%	6%	22%	9%	1%	4%	4%	3% (Note: Gretchen Whitmer with 3%)	—
Echelon Insights	January 22–26, 2026	502 (LV)	2%	3%	8%	21%	4%	27%	9%	—	3%	3%	7% (Note: Gretchen Whitmer with 3%, Raphael Warnock with 2%, Wes Moore with 1%, "Someone else" with 1%)	12%
Big Data Poll	January 22–24, 2026	1,346 (LV)	2.5%	—	11.7%	31.4%	—	22.2%	6.4%	—	—	6.1%	7.2% (Note: Gretchen Whitmer with 3.1%, "Someone else" with 4.1%)	12.4%
YouGov	January 9–14, 2026	1,024 (A)	2%	3%	8%	20%	7%	17%	9%	—	3%	2%	12% (Note: Bernie Sanders with 7%, Elizabeth Warren with 3%, Tim Walz with 1%, Gretchen Whitmer with 0%, Amy Klobuchar 0%)	17%
Zogby Analytics	January 1–7, 2026	374 (LV)	—	—	7.6%	30.4%	7.3%	20.7%	11%	—	5.2%	6%	3.8% (Note: Ruben Gallego with 1.4%, "Someone else" with 2.4%)	8.2%

== 2025 ==
Poll source	Date(s) administered	Sample size	Cory Booker	Pete Buttigieg	Kamala Harris	Gavin Newsom	Alexandria Ocasio-Cortez	JB Pritzker	Josh Shapiro	Tim Walz	Gretchen Whitmer	Other	Undecided
Daily Mail/J.L. Partners	December 17–19, 2025	383 (LV)	3%	7%	30%	21%	3%	3%	4%	3%	2%	13% (Note: Mark Kelly with 4%, Andy Beshear with 2%, Wes Moore with 2%, Jon Ossoff with 1%, Amy Klobuchar with 1%, Ro Khanna with 1%, Ruben Gallego with 0%, John Fetterman with 0%, "None of the above" with 2%)	10%
AtlasIntel	December 15–19, 2025	2,315 (A)	2.5%	14.5%	7.8%	35.4%	16%	—	6.1%	4.3%	1.8%	11.5% (Note: Andy Beshear with 5.8%, Ro Khanna with 1.8%, Rahm Emanuel with 1.1%, Wes Moore with 1.1%, Raphael Warnock with 0.2%, Stephen A. Smith with 0%, "None of the above" with 1.5%)	—
McLaughlin & Associates	December 12–19, 2025	460 (LV)	2%	8%	27%	17%	6%	2%	5%	4%	2%	10% (Note: Jasmine Crockett with 2%, Roy Cooper with 2%, Amy Klobuchar with 1%, Wes Moore with 1%, Jared Polis with 1%, Stephen A. Smith with 1%, Phil Murphy with 0%, Rahm Emanuel with 0%)	21%
Echelon Insights	December 11–15, 2025	498 (LV)	4%	11%	22%	23%	6%	5%	4%	3%	2%	11% (Note: Andy Beshear with 3%, Mark Kelly with 2%, Rahm Emanuel with 1%, Chris Murphy with 1%, Raphael Warnock with 1%, "Someone else" with 1%)	12%
Big Data Poll	December 10–12, 2025	1,331 (RV)	—	10%	31.1%	20.3%	6.3%	—	6.4%	—	3.1%	8.4% (Note: Andy Beshear with 3.5%, "Someone else" with 4.9%)	14.4%
McLaughlin & Associates	November 17–24, 2025	437 (LV)	3%	8%	29%	20%	6%	3%	4%	1%	2%	10% (Note: Jasmine Crockett with 5%, Stephen A. Smith with 2%, Roy Cooper with 1%, Wes Moore with 1%, Rahm Emanuel with 1%, Amy Klobuchar with 0%, Phil Murphy with 0%, Jared Polis with 0%)	16%
Echelon Insights	November 13–17, 2025	484 (LV)	4%	12%	17%	29%	6%	2%	3%	2%	1%	13% (Note: Mark Cuban with 3%, Andy Beshear with 2%, Jasmine Crockett with 2%, Jon Stewart with 2%, Raphael Warnock with 1%, Chris Murphy with 1%, John Fetterman with 1%, Jared Polis with 1%)	11%
Yale Youth Poll	October 29 – November 11, 2025	1,588 (RV)	4.7	13.8%	18.3%	24.5%	15.5%	4%	4.1%	2.8%	1.1%	11.2% (Note: Andy Beshear with 2.3%, Mark Cuban with 1.6%, Wes Moore with 0.9%, Jon Ossoff with 0.7%, Chris Murphy with 0.7%, Mark Kelly with 0.7%, Jared Polis with 0.5%, Raphael Warnock with 0.3%, Ruben Gallego with 0.2%, Rahm Emanuel with 0.1%, "Other" with 3.2%)	—
Morning Consult	November 7–9, 2025	984 (RV)	—	8%	29%	20%	7%	—	—	—	—	22% (Note: "Someone else" with 22%)	13%
YouGov	November 6–9, 2025	998 (A)	4%	10%	21%	19%	6%	2%	3%	3%	1%	15% (Note: Bernie Sanders with 6%, Elizabeth Warren with 3%, Mark Kellywith 1%, Amy Klobuchar with 0%, "Someone else" with 4%)	17%
Emerson College	November 3–4, 2025	417 (RV)	1.2%	8.6%	10.3%	24.5%	2.8%	2.3%	2.6%	—	1%	11.9% (Note: Andy Beshear with 2.2%, Bernie Sanders with 1.9%, "Someone else" with 7.8%)	34.9%
Overton Insights	October 27–29, 2025	396 (RV)	5%	7%	35%	23%	7%	—	5%	3%	4%	4% (Note: Wes Moore with 3%, Stephen A. Smith with 1%)	6%
McLaughlin & Associates	October 21–27, 2025	437 (LV)	3%	6%	25%	22%	4%	4%	6%	2%	1%	13% (Note: Jasmine Crockett with 3%, Stephen A. Smith with 3%, Amy Klobuchar with 2%, Wes Moore with 1%, Roy Cooper with 1%, Phil Murphy with 1%, Rahm Emanuel with 1%, Jared Polis with 0%)	17%
Echelon Insights	October 16–20, 2025	512 (LV)	5%	10%	24%	15%	4%	4%	5%	5%	2%	12% (Note: Jasmine Crockett with 3%, Jon Stewart with 2%, Andy Beshear with 2%, Raphael Warnock with 1%, Mark Cuban with 1%, Stephen A. Smith with 1%, John Fetterman with 1%, Wes Moore with 1%)	12%
The Center Square/Noble Predictive Insights	October 2–6, 2025	1,147 (RV)	—	7%	33%	21%	8%	4%	4%	—	3%	3% (Note: Wes Moore with 1%, "Someone else" with 2%)	17%
Leger	September 26–29, 2025	341 (LV)	—	9%	24%	19%	9%	6%	8%	—	4%	5% (Note: "Another candidate" with 5%)	17%
McLaughlin & Associates	September 17–22, 2025	429 (LV)	4%	7%	21%	22%	5%	2%	4%	2%	1%	11% (Note: Jasmine Crockett with 5%, Amy Klobuchar with 2%, Roy Cooper with 1%, Wes Moore with 1%, Jared Polis with 1%, Stephen A. Smith with 1%, Phil Murphy with 1%, Rahm Emanuel with 0%)	20%
Echelon Insights	September 18–22, 2025	500 (LV)	6%	7%	23%	17%	7%	2%	6%	2%	2%	15% (Note: Jasmine Crockett with 3%, Mark Cuban with 3%, Jon Stewart 2%, John Fetterman with 1%, Andy Beshear with 1%, Chris Murphy with 1%, Rahm Emanuel with 1%, Raphael Warnock with 1%, Ro Khanna with 1%, "Someone else" with 1%)	12%
AtlasIntel	September 12–16, 2025	1,066 (A)	2.9%	12.1%	20.5%	37.4%	10.8%	—	2.1%	3.6%	0.3%	10.1% (Note: Andy Beshear with 2.7%, Raphael Warnock with 0.6%, Wes Moore with 0.6%, Stephen A. Smith with 0.2%, "None of the above" with 6%)	—
YouGov	September 5–8, 2025	519 (A)	1%	6%	19%	23%	8%	4%	—	5%	2%	15% (Note: Bernie Sanders with 5%, Elizabeth Warren with 3%, Mark Kelly with 2%, Amy Klobuchar with 1%, "Someone else" with 4%)	16%
YouGov/Yahoo	August 29 – September 2, 2025	1,690 (A) (Note: Sample size of full poll; YouGov/Yahoo did not publish a separate sample size for the Democratic primary subsample)	—	10%	19%	21%	12%	7%	4%	4%	2%	—	—
Leger	August 29–31, 2025	328 (LV)	—	8%	30%	24%	10%	4%	2%	—	2%	3% (Note: "Another candidate" with 3%)	18%
McLaughlin & Associates	August 21–26, 2025	434 (LV)	3%	9%	27%	18%	4%	2%	3%	2%	2%	10% (Note: Jasmine Crockett with 3%, Roy Cooper with 1%, Wes Moore with 1%, Phil Murphy with 1%, Amy Klobuchar with 1%, Jared Polis with 1%, Stephen A. Smith with 1%, Rahm Emanuel with 1%)	20%
Emerson College	August 25–26, 2025	387 (RV)	2.3%	16%	11.4%	25.1%	4.1%	4.1%	5.3%	2.2%	1.5	12% (Note: Bernie Sanders with 2.5%, Andy Beshear with 2%, Wes Moore with 1.9%, Ro Khanna with 1.3%, Amy Klobuchar with 0.8%, Rahm Emanuel with 0.4%, "Someone else" with 3.1%)	15.9%
Morning Consult	August 22–24, 2025	1,000 (LV)	—	9%	29%	19%	6%	3%	4%	3%	2%	10% (Note: Andy Beshear with 2%, Wes Moore with 1%, "Someone else" with 7%)	15%
Echelon Insights	August 14–17, 2025	522 (LV)	5%	11%	26%	13%	6%	3%	3%	2%	3%	11% (Note: Jasmine Crockett with 3%, Mark Cuban with 2%, Andy Beshear with 2%, Wes Moore with 1%, Jon Stewart with 1%, Stephen A. Smith with 1%, "Someone else" with 1%)	16%
AtlasIntel	July 13–18, 2025	1,935 (A)	4.1%	26.7%	14.5%	15.8%	18.5%	—	3.2%	8.7%	1.4	7.1% (Note: Zohran Mamdani with 4%, (Note: Mamdani is not eligible to serve as president as he is not a natural-born citizen.) Raphael Warnock with 0.5%, Rahm Emanuel with 0.3%, "None of the above" with 2.3%)	—
Echelon Insights	July 10–14, 2025	505 (LV)	7%	11%	26%	10%	6%	2%	4%	3%	3%	16% (Note: Mark Cuban with 3%, Andy Beshear with 2%, Chris Murphy with 2%, John Fetterman with 2%, Wes Moore with 1%, Jasmine Crockett with 1%, Jon Stewart with 1%, Stephen A. Smith with 1%, Raphael Warnock with 1%, "Someone else" with 2%)	13%
McLaughlin & Associates	July 9–14, 2025	444 (LV)	4%	8%	25%	9%	9%	2%	4%	4%	4%	13% (Note: Amy Klobuchar with 3%, Roy Cooper with 2%, Stephen A. Smith with 2%, Jasmine Crockett with 2%, Wes Moore with 1%, Phil Murphy with 1%, Rahm Emanuel with 1%, Jared Polis with 1%, Deval Patrick*, Beto O'Rourke*)	22%
Overton Insights	June 23–26, 2025	396 (RV)	4%	11%	38%	10%	7%	—	7%	—	5%	4% (Note: Wes Moore with 2%, Stephen A. Smith with 2%)	6%
Emerson College	June 24–25, 2025	404 (RV)	3.4%	15.6%	12.6%	11.7%	7.1%	2%	7%	1.7%	3.1%	12.6% (Note: Bernie Sanders with 5.4%, Wes Moore with 2%, Andy Beshear with 2%, Amy Klobuchar with 1%, Rahm Emanuel with 0.7%, "Someone else" with 1.5%)	23%
co/efficient	June 12–16, 2025	1,035 (LV) (Note: Sample size of full poll; co/efficient did not publish a separate sample size for the Democratic primary subsample. Figures as published sum to 129%, including undecided.)	—	11%	26%	21%	14%	—	3%	10%	—	33% (Note: Other Democrat 33%)	11%
McLaughlin & Associates	June 10–15, 2025	434 (LV)	7%	10%	30%	8%	7%	1%	3%	4%	3%	10% (Note: Jasmine Crockett with 2%, Rahm Emanuel with 2%, Amy Klobuchar with 2%, Roy Cooper with 1%, Wes Moore with 1%, Stephen A. Smith with 1%, Phil Murphy with 1%, Jared Polis with 0%)	21%
Morning Consult	June 13–15, 2025	1,000 (RV)	3%	7%	34%	11%	7%	2%	2%	4%	2%	10% (Note: Mark Cuban with 4%, Amy Klobuchar with 2%, Andy Beshear with 1%, Jared Polis with 1%, Ruben Gallego with 1%, John Fetterman with 1%, Jon Ossoff with 0%, Raphael Warnock with 0%, Chris Murphy with 0%, Wes Moore with 0%)	16%
AtlasIntel	May 21–27, 2025	3,469 (A)	10.4%	31.5%	16.6%	7.1%	19.4%	0.1%	4.8%	—	3.7%	2.8% (Note: Raphael Warnock with 1.4%, Chris Murphy with 0.4%, Ro Khanna with 0.3%, Stephen A. Smith with 0.3%, Andy Beshear with 0.2%, Rahm Emanuel with 0.2%)	3.6%
McLaughlin & Associates	May 21–26, 2025	439 (LV)	7%	10%	29%	4%	9%	2%	6%	3%	3%	9% (Note: Amy Klobuchar with 3%, Jasmine Crockett with 2%, Stephen A. Smith with 1%, Roy Cooper with 1%, Jared Polis with 1%, Phil Murphy with 1%, Wes Moore with 0%)	19%
Echelon Insights	May 8–12, 2025	471 (LV)	6%	10%	32%	5%	8%	5%	2%	5%	2%	14% (Note: Jasmine Crockett with 3%, Mark Cuban with 2%, Wes Moore with 1%, John Fetterman with 1%, Andy Beshear with 1%, Jared Polis with 1%, Raphael Warnock with 1%, Chris Murphy with 1%, Jon Stewart with 1%, "Someone else" with 1%)	13%
McLaughlin & Associates	April 22–29, 2025	442 (LV)	7%	6%	30%	8%	8%	3%	4%	4%	1%	9% (Note: Jasmine Crockett with 2%, Roy Cooper with 2%, Amy Klobuchar with 2%, Phil Murphy with 1%, Wes Moore with 1%, Stephen A. Smith with 1%, Jared Polis with 0%)	21%
YouGov/The Times	April 21–23, 2025	1,296 (A) (Note: Sample size of full poll; YouGov/The Times did not publish a separate sample size for the Democratic primary subsample)	7%	9%	28%	7%	7%	3%	4%	3%	1%	14% (Note: Elizabeth Warren with 4%, Wes Moore with 1%, Andy Beshear with 1%, Rahm Emanuel with 1%, Mark Kelly with 1%, "Someone else" with 2%, "I would not vote" with 4%)	18%
Quantus Insights	April 21–23, 2025	700 (RV)	13%	13%	30%	7%	14%	—	5%	5%	—	6% (Note: Bernie Sanders with 6%)	5%
AtlasIntel	April 10–14, 2025	2,347 (A)	8.7%	27.7%	24.1%	6.8%	15.9%	—	—	—	8.6%	5.9% (Note: Andy Beshear with 2.4%, Raphael Warnock with 1.9%, Chris Murphy with 1.6%)	1.7%
Echelon Insights	April 10–14, 2025	449 (LV)	11%	7%	28%	4%	7%	3%	3%	5%	3%	16% (Note: Jasmine Crockett with 3%, Jon Stewart with 3%, Wes Moore with 2%, Andy Beshear with 1%, Jared Polis with 1%, John Fetterman with 1%, Raphael Warnock with 1%, Stephen A. Smith with 1%, Chris Murphy with 1%, "Someone else" with 2%)	12%
Data for Progress	April 9–14, 2025	745 (LV)	12%	14%	18%	8%	12%	4%	5%	4%	4%	16% (Note: Jon Stewart with 2%, Amy Klobuchar with 2%, Andy Beshear with 2%, Mark Cuban with 2%, Chris Murphy with 1%, Wes Moore with 1%, Stephen A. Smith with <0.5%, Jasmine Crockett with <0.5%, Raphael Warnock with <0.5%, Shawn Fain with <0.5%)	7%
Yale Youth Poll	April 1–3, 2025	4,100 (RV) (Note: Sample size of full poll; Yale Youth Poll did not publish a separate sample size for the Democratic primary subsample)	—	14%	27.5%	6.4%	21.3%	3.3%	4.6%	—	3%	20% (Note: Mark Kelly with 3.6%, Mark Cuban with 3.2%, Andy Beshear with 2.8%, Roy Cooper with 1.3%, Stephen A. Smith with 1%, Wes Moore with 0.7%, John Fetterman with 0.5%, Ruben Gallego with 0.5%, Jared Polis with 0.3%, "Other" with 6.1%)	—
YouGov/Economist	March 30 – April 1, 2025	691 (A)	1%	10%	25%	7%	8%	—	—	4%	2%	19% (Note: Bernie Sanders with 8%, Mark Kelly with 4%, Elizabeth Warren with 2%, Gretchen Whitmer 2%, "Someone else" with 3%)	25%
Morning Consult	March 14–16, 2025	—	3%	10%	36%	5%	5%	2%	4%	5%	2%	16% (Note: Mark Cuban with 4%, Andy Beshear with 2%, Amy Klobuchar with 2%, Chris Murphy with 1%, Jared Polis with 1%, John Fetterman with 1%, Wes Moore with 1%, Rahm Emanuel with 1%, Raphael Warnock with 1%, Ruben Gallego with 0%, "Someone else" with 2%)	13%
Echelon Insights	March 10–13, 2025	457 (LV)	2%	10%	33%	7%	7%	2%	2%	5%	2%	14% (Note: Jasmine Crockett with 3%, Mark Cuban with 3%, Andy Beshear with 2%, Jared Polis with 1%, John Fetterman with 1%, Raphael Warnock with 1%, Chris Murphy with 1%, Jon Stewart with 1%, "Someone else" with 1%)	15%
SurveyUSA	February 13–16, 2025	835 (RV)	—	11%	37%	9%	7%	—	6%	—	4%	24% (Note: Mark Cuban with 7%, Andy Beshear with 3%, Wes Moore with 2%, Phil Murphy with 1%, "Someone else" with 11%)	—
McLaughlin & Associates	February 11–18, 2025	418 (LV)	3%	8%	36%	4%	3%	2%	3%	4%	4%	11% (Note: Amy Klobuchar with 3%, Roy Cooper with 2%, Beto O'Rourke with 2%, Wes Moore with 1%, Deval Patrick with 1%, Phil Murphy with 1%, Stephen A. Smith with 1%, Jared Polis with 0%)	23%
Echelon Insights	February 10–13, 2025	447 (LV)	2%	10%	36%	6%	5%	2%	3%	9%	4%	13% (Note: Mark Cuban with 3%, Jasmine Crockett with 2%, John Fetterman with 2%, Raphael Warnock with 2%, Jared Polis with 1%, Andy Beshear with 1%, Ruben Gallego with 1%, "Someone else" with 1%)	10%
McLaughlin & Associates	January 22–27, 2025	414 (LV)	2%	9%	33%	7%	6%	1%	3%	3%	3%	10.2% (Note: Amy Klobuchar with 3%, Wes Moore with 2%, Stephen A. Smith with 2%, Beto O'Rourke with 1%, Phil Murphy with 1%, Jared Polis with 1%, Deval Patrick with 0.2%)	22%
	January 20, 2025	Second inauguration of Donald Trump											

== 2024 ==
Poll source	Date(s) administered	Sample size	Pete Buttigieg	Kamala Harris	Gavin Newsom	Alexandria Ocasio-Cortez	JB Pritzker	Josh Shapiro	Tim Walz	Gretchen Whitmer	Other	Undecided
McLaughlin & Associates	December 11–16, 2024	428 (LV)	12%	35%	7%	3%	3%	5%	5%	3%	9.4% (Note: Beto O'Rourke with 3%, Cory Booker with 2%, Amy Klobuchar with 1%, Wes Moore with 1%, Phil Murphy with 1%, Deval Patrick with 1%, Jared Polis with 0.4%)	19%
Emerson College	November 20–22, 2024	400 (RV)	4%	37%	7%	1%	1%	3%	1%	3%	12% (Note: Michelle Obama with 2%, Bernie Sanders with 2%, Hakeem Jeffries with 1%, Wes Moore with 1%, Rashida Tlaib with 1%, Jon Stewart with 1%, Mark Kelly with <1%, Andy Beshear with <1%, "Someone else" with 4%)	35%
Echelon Insights	November 14–18, 2024	457 (LV)	6%	41%	8%	4%	2%	7%	6%	3%	7% (Note: Andy Beshear with 2%, Cory Booker with 2%, Jared Polis with 1%, Wes Moore with 1%, "Someone else" with 1%)	16%
Morning Consult	November 15–17, 2024	1,012 (RV)	9%	43%	8%	4%	1%	5%	7%	3%	19% (Note: Cory Booker with 2%, Amy Klobuchar with 2%, Elizabeth Warren with 2%, Andy Beshear with 2%, Wes Moore with 1%, John Fetterman with 1%, "Someone else" with 3%, "Would not vote" with 6%)	—
	November 5, 2024	2024 United States presidential election held.										
Morning Consult/Politico	May 28–29, 2024	3,997 (RV)	10%	21%	10%	—	—	3%	—	4%	11% (Note: Mark Kelly with 4%, "Someone else" with 7%)	41%
Echelon Insights	January 16–18, 2024	499 (LV)	13%	33%	11%	—	3%	2%	—	3%	13% (Note: John Fetterman with 2%, Raphael Warnock with 2%, Andy Beshear with 1%, Wes Moore with 1%, "Someone else" with 7%)	23%

== See also ==
- Statewide opinion polling for the 2028 Democratic Party presidential primaries
- 2028 Democratic National Convention
- 2028 United States presidential election
