= Thielmann =

Thielmann is a German surname. Notable people with the name include:

- Johann von Thielmann (1765–1824), Saxon cavalry general
- Jan Thielmann (born 2002), German professional footballer
- Greg Thielmann (A. Gregory Thielmann), arms control specialist
- Klaus Thielmann (1933–2024), German politician

== See also ==
- Thielman
- Thielemann
- Thiemann
