= Tielman =

Tielman, or Tieleman, is a primarily archaic Dutch given name that could be of West Frisian origin. It also exists as a patronymic surname. Notable people with the name include:

== Given name ==
- Tielman van Gameren (1632–1706), Dutch architect and engineer working in Poland as Tylman Gamerski
- Tielman Roos (1879–1935), South African politician and minister
- Tielman Susato (also Tylman) 1510–1570, Renaissance composer, instrumentalist and publisher of music in Antwerp

== Surname ==
- Andy Tielman (1936–2011), Indonesia-born Dutch singer and guitarist
  - Tielman Brothers, his 1950s Dutch-Indo band
- Rob Tielman (born 1946), Dutch sociologist

== See also ==
- Dielman (disambiguation)
- Theodoros or Theodorus, a given name
- Tielemans
- Tilman
- Tillmann (disambiguation)
- Tylman
