= John Tillman =

John Tillman may refer to:

- John N. Tillman (1859–1929), U.S. Representative from Arkansas
- John Tillman (lacrosse) (born c. 1970), American lacrosse coach
- John Tillman (policy), American nonprofit executive
- John Tillman Lamkin (1811–1870), American politician
- John Tillman (triple jumper) (born 1965), American triple jumper
- John T. Tilman (1845–1905), American politician in the Virginia House of Delegates

== See also ==
- John Tillmann (1961–2018), Canadian art thief
