= Thielman =

Thielman is a German surname. Notable people with the name include:

- Jake Thielman (John Peter Thielman, 1879–1928), German-American baseball pitcher
- Henry Thielman (1880–1942), brother of the above, baseball pitcher
- Vale P. Thielman (1843–1925) American politician from South Dakota

== See also ==
- Thielmann
- Thielemann
- Thiemann
