= Statewide opinion polling for the 2028 Democratic Party presidential primaries =

2028 Democratic Party presidential primaries statewide polling
- TBD

Leading presidential candidate by state or district, based on opinion polls. This map only represents polling data, it is not a prediction for the election.
Pete Buttigieg
Kamala Harris
Gavin Newsom
Alexandria Ocasio-Cortez
Jon Ossoff
Four or more candidates statistically tied
No polls conducted
Incumbent Democratic nominee
Kamala Harris

This is a list of statewide public opinion polls that have been conducted relating to the Democratic primaries for the 2028 United States presidential election. The persons named in the polls are people who have expressed interest or have received media speculation about their possible candidacy.

== Alaska primary ==
Poll source	Date(s) administered	Sample size (Note: Key: A – all adults RV – registered voters LV – likely voters V – unclear)	Pete Buttigieg	Kamala Harris	Gavin Newsom	Alexandria Ocasio-Cortez	JB Pritzker	Tim Walz	Gretchen Whitmer	Other	Undecided
Alaska Survey Research	October 10–15, 2025	315 (RV)	20%	19%	23%	17%	6%	7%	5%	5% (Note: Andy Beshear with 3%, Josh Shapiro with 2%)	—

== California primary ==
Poll source	Date(s) administered	Sample size	Pete Buttigieg	Kamala Harris	Mark Kelly	Gavin Newsom	Alexandria Ocasio-Cortez	Josh Shapiro	Gretchen Whitmer	Other	Undecided
McLaughlin & Associates	October 17–20, 2026	419 (LV)	17%	7%	10%	14%	18%	3%	1%	7% (Note: JB Pritzker with 3%, Cory Booker with 2%, Rahm Emanuel with 1%, Wes Moore with 1%, Jared Polis with 0%, Stephen A. Smith with 0%)	23%
UC Berkeley IGS/LA Times	March 9–15, 2026	2,317 (RV)	11%	9%	7%	26%	14%	2%	2%	8% (Note: JB Pritzker with 3%, Andy Beshear with 2%, Ro Khanna with 2%, Cory Booker with 2%, Wes Moore with 1%, Rahm Emanuel with 0%, Gina Raimondo with 0%)	19%
UC Berkeley Citrin Center/TrueDot/Politico	February 25 – March 3, 2026	702 (LV)	11%	14%	5%	28%	12%	4%	1%	10% (Note: Ro Khanna with 3%, Andy Beshear with 2%, JB Pritzker with 2%, Cory Booker with 2%, Ruben Gallego with 1%, Amy Klobuchar with 1%, Chris Murphy with 1%, Wes Moore with 1%, Rahm Emanuel with 0%, Jared Polis with 0%, Raphael Warnock with 0%)	—
Emerson College/Nexstar Media (Note: Poll sponsored by Inside California Politics)	December 1–2, 2025	567 (LV)	15.7%	8.8%	—	35.9%	13.4%	3.4%	1.7%	7.4% (Note: JB Pritzker with 3.5%, Andy Beshear with 2.1%, Cory Booker with 1.6%, Amy Klobuchar with 1.2%, "Other" with 1.8%)	11%
UC Berkeley Citrin Center/TrueDot/Politico (Note: Poll sponsored by the California Constitution Center at UC Berkeley School of Law)	July 28 – August 12, 2025	807 (RV)	13%	19%	2%	25%	10%	3%	3%	20% (Note: Tim Walz with 4%, Cory Booker with 4%, Ro Khanna with 3%, Andy Beshear with 3%, Amy Klobuchar with 2%, JB Pritzker with 1%, Ruben Gallego with 1%, Gina Raimondo with 1%, Chris Murphy with 1%, Wes Moore with 1%, Rahm Emanuel with 1%, Raphael Warnock with 1%, Jared Polis with 1%, "Other" with 2%)	—
Emerson College	August 4–5, 2025	444 (LV)	17.4%	11%	—	23.1%	9%	4.4%	1.6%	15.7% (Note: Andy Beshear with 4.8%, Bernie Sanders with 3.9%, Cory Booker with 2.7%, Tim Walz with 2.3%, JB Pritzker with 1.9%, Amy Klobuchar with 1.2%, Wes Moore with 0.8%, Rahm Emanuel with 0.8%, Ro Khanna with 0.6%, "Someone else" with 0.7%)	13.9%
Capitol Weekly	May 21–30, 2025	1,122 (LV)	7.3%	15.3%	—	17.2%	9.9%	6.3%	5.5%	5% (Note: Elizabeth Warren with 5%)	33.1% (Note: Reported as "Other/Undecided")
Capitol Weekly	February 3–7, 2025	681 (RV)	15%	15%	—	27%	—	6%	6%	30% (Note: Amy Klobuchar with 6%, Cory Booker with 5%, JB Pritzker with 1%, Ruben Gallego with 0%, Wes Moore with 0%, "Other" with 18%)	—

== Florida primary ==
Poll source	Date(s) administered	Sample size	Pete Buttigieg	Kamala Harris	Mark Kelly	Gavin Newsom	Alexandria Ocasio-Cortez	Jon Ossoff	Josh Shapiro	Other	Undecided
Big Data Poll (Note: Poll funded by the crowdsourced Public Polling Project)	October 26–30, 2026	284 (LV)	10.1%	30.9%	3.9%	16.5%	9.8%	4.4%	3.8%	11.2% (Note: Andy Beshear with 3.3%, Stephen A. Smith with 3.1%, Gretchen Whitmer with 2.3%, "Someone else" with 2.5%)	9.3%
Victory Insights	June 7–10, 2025	600 (LV) (Note: Sample size of full poll; Victory Insights did not publish a separate sample size for the Democratic primary subsample)	23%	—	—	12%	14%	—	3%	17% (Note: Cory Booker with 12%, Andy Beshear with 5%)	31%

== Georgia primary ==
Poll source	Date(s) administered	Sample size	Pete Buttigieg	Kamala Harris	Mark Kelly	Gavin Newsom	Alexandria Ocasio-Cortez	Jon Ossoff	Other	Undecided
Big Data Poll	September 21–23, 2026	313 (LV)	7.1%	24%	5.5%	12.9%	6%	29.6%	10.7% (Note: Josh Shapiro with 3.5%, Andy Beshear with 3.3%, Gretchen Whitmer with 1.1%, Stephen A. Smith with 0.8%, "Someone else" with 2%)	4.2%

== Maine primary ==
Poll source	Date(s) administered	Sample size	Cory Booker	Pete Buttigieg	Kamala Harris	Gavin Newsom	Alexandria Ocasio-Cortez	JB Pritzker	Bernie Sanders	Other	Undecided
University of New Hampshire	October 16–21, 2025	470 (LV)	7%	14%	9%	16%	15%	8%	7%	14% (Note: Gretchen Whitmer with 5%, Andy Beshear with 2%, Josh Shapiro with 2%, Amy Klobuchar with 2%, Mark Kelly with 2%, Ro Khanna with 1%, Gina Raimondo with 0%, Rahm Emanuel with 0%, Wes Moore with 0%, Ruben Gallego with 0%, "Other" with 0%)	11%

== Massachusetts primary ==
Poll source	Date(s) administered	Sample size	Pete Buttigieg	Kamala Harris	Mark Kelly	Gavin Newsom	Alexandria Ocasio-Cortez	Josh Shapiro	Other	Undecided
Suffolk University/Boston Globe	August 13–16, 2026	500 (LV)	21%	9.8%	7.6%	11.8%	14.2%	7.4%	13.6% (Note: Andy Beshear with 3.2%, Gretchen Whitmer with 3.2%, JB Pritzker with 2%, Rahm Emanuel with 1%, "Other" with 4.2%)	14.6%

== Michigan primary ==
Poll source	Date(s) administered	Sample size	Cory Booker	Pete Buttigieg	Kamala Harris	Mark Kelly	Gavin Newsom	Alexandria Ocasio-Cortez	Gretchen Whitmer	Other	Undecided
Glengariff Group/WDIV/Detroit News	July 8–11, 2026	500 (LV)	8.3%	19.4%	25.1%	8.3%	10.1%	11.5%	—	9.8% (Note: Josh Shapiro with 4.4%, JB Pritzker with 2.2%, Wes Moore with 1.6%, "Someone else" with 1.6%)	7.5%
Glengariff Group (Note: Poll sponsored by the Detroit Regional Chamber)	April 17–19, 2026	500 (LV)	—	17%	14.6%	8.3%	15.2%	6.3%	20.9%	7.2% (Note: Josh Shapiro with 3.6%, JB Pritzker with 2.4%, Andy Beshear with 0.6%, James Talarico with 0.2%, Elizabeth Warren with 0.2%, Michelle Obama with 0.2%)	10.5%

== Minnesota primary ==
Poll source	Date(s) administered	Sample size	Andy Beshear	Pete Buttigieg	Kamala Harris	Mark Kelly	Gavin Newsom	Alexandria Ocasio-Cortez	Jon Ossoff	Josh Shapiro	Other	Undecided
Big Data Poll	September 29–30, 2026	297 (LV)	3.1%	12.3%	24.3%	7.2%	10.5%	15.3%	6.3%	5.3%	3.9% (Note: Stephen A. Smith with 1.4%, Gretchen Whitmer with 0.3%, "Someone else" with 2.2%)	11.9%

== Nevada primary ==
Poll source	Date(s) administered	Sample size	Andy Beshear	Pete Buttigieg	Kamala Harris	Gavin Newsom	Alexandria Ocasio-Cortez	JB Pritzker	Josh Shapiro	Other	Undecided
Emerson College	November 16–18, 2025	348 (RV)	3.6%	18.9%	6%	36.9%	8.9%	3.5%	3%	4.7% (Note: Cory Booker with 1.3%, Amy Klobuchar with 1.1%, Gretchen Whitmer with 1%, "Someone else" with 1.3%)	14.4%

== New Hampshire primary ==
Poll source	Date(s) administered	Sample size	Pete Buttigieg	Kamala Harris	Mark Kelly	Gavin Newsom	Alexandria Ocasio-Cortez	Jon Ossoff	JB Pritzker	Other	Undecided
Saint Anselm College	October 19–20, 2026	784 (LV)	28%	5%	11%	8%	10%	14%	3%	10% (Note: Ro Khanna with 2%, Andy Beshear with 2%, Josh Shapiro with 2%, Rahm Emanuel with 1%, Cory Booker with 1%, Wes Moore with 1%, Gretchen Whitmer with 0%, Chris Murphy with 0%, "Other" with 1%)	9%
Saint Anselm College	August 17–18, 2026	733 (LV)	25%	3%	12%	7%	17%	12%	2%	11% (Note: Cory Booker with 2%, Ro Khanna with 2%, Rahm Emanuel with 2%, Josh Shapiro with 1%, Wes Moore with 1%, Andy Beshear with 1%, Gretchen Whitmer with 0%, Chris Murphy with 0%, "Other" with 2%)	12%
University of New Hampshire	July 15–20, 2026	648 (LV)	21%	5%	9%	8%	22%	2%	1%	14% (Note: Bernie Sanders with 6%, Josh Shapiro with 2%, Ro Khanna with 2%, Cory Booker with 2%, Amy Klobuchar with 1%, Andy Beshear with 1%, Rahm Emanuel with 0%, Gretchen Whitmer with 0%, Wes Moore with 0%, Ruben Gallego with 0%)	12%
Saint Anselm College	June 24–25, 2026	810 (RV)	29%	4%	1%	11%	17%	2%	3%	18% (Note: Cory Booker with 3%, Andy Beshear with 3%, Josh Shapiro with 3%, Amy Klobuchar with 3%, Wes Moore with 2%, Chris Murphy with 1%, Rahm Emanuel with 1%, Gretchen Whitmer with 0%, "Other" with 2%)	15%
Emerson College	March 21–23, 2026	523 (LV)	19.7%	8.4%	10.1%	11.6%	11.8%	—	5.1%	9.6% (Note: Josh Shapiro with 4.4%, Andy Beshear with 2.7%, "Someone else" with 2.5%)	23.6%
Saint Anselm College	March 16–18, 2026	690 (RV)	29%	6%	—	15%	10%	—	5%	20% (Note: Amy Klobuchar with 4%, Andy Beshear with 4%, Josh Shapiro with 4%, Cory Booker with 2%, Chris Murphy with 2%, Gretchen Whitmer with 2%, Rahm Emanuel with 1%, Wes Moore with 1%, "Other" with 4%)	11%
University of New Hampshire	February 12–16, 2026	635 (LV)	20%	10%	10%	15%	15%	—	5%	17% (Note: Bernie Sanders with 5%, Josh Shapiro with 4%, Andy Beshear with 3%, Cory Booker with 2%, Amy Klobuchar with 1%, Gretchen Whitmer with 1%, Rahm Emanuel with 0%, Wes Moore with 0%, Ro Khanna with 0%, Ruben Gallego with 0%, "Another candidate" with 1%)	8%
Saint Anselm College	November 18–19, 2025	1,015 (LV)	28%	6%	—	24%	—	—	4%	19% (Note: Cory Booker with 4%, Josh Shapiro with 3%, Amy Klobuchar with 2%, Andy Beshear with 2%, Gretchen Whitmer with 2%, Chris Murph with 1%, Wes Moore with 1%, Rahm Emanuel with 0%, Ruben Gallego with 0%, "Other" with 4%)	18%
University of New Hampshire	October 16–21, 2025	602 (LV)	19%	11%	3%	15%	14%	—	6%	22% (Note: Bernie Sanders with 8%, Andy Beshear with 3%, Amy Klobuchar with 3%, Cory Booker with 2%, Josh Shapiro with 2%, Gretchen Whitmer with 1%, Wes Moore with 0%, Ro Khanna with 0%, Rahm Emanuel with 0%, Stephen A. Smith with 0%, Gina Raimondo with 0%, Josh Green with 0%, "Other" with 3%)	10%
Saint Anselm College	August 26–27, 2025	867 (RV)	23%	6%	—	23%	7%	—	9%	20% (Note: Cory Booker with 5%, Bernie Sanders with 4%, Amy Klobuchar with 3%, Josh Shapiro with 3%, Gretchen Whitmer with 2%, "Other" with 3%)	12%

== North Carolina primary ==
Poll source	Date(s) administered	Sample size	Cory Booker	Pete Buttigieg	Kamala Harris	Mark Kelly	Gavin Newsom	Alexandria Ocasio-Cortez	Josh Shapiro	Other	Undecided
Big Data Poll	September 27–29, 2026	281 (LV)	—	15%	31%	5%	14%	8%	8%	11% (Note: Jon Ossoff with 3%, Gretchen Whitmer with 3%, Andy Beshear with 2%, Stephen A. Smith with 1%, "Someone else" with 2%)	8%
Emerson College	July 28–30, 2025	421 (LV) (Note: Press release states a Democratic primary sample size of n=445, but crosstabs consistently show a sample size of n=421)	5.2%	16.8%	12%	—	10.2%	4.1%	3.2%	24.8% (Note: Bernie Sanders with 6.9%, Andy Beshear with 3.7%, Tim Walz with 3.3%, Gretchen Whitmer with 3.2%, JB Pritzker with 2.7%, Wes Moore with 2.2%, Amy Klobuchar with 1%, Rahm Emanuel with 0.3%, "Someone else" with 1.5%)	23.9%

== Ohio primary ==
Poll source	Date(s) administered	Sample size	Andy Beshear	Pete Buttigieg	Kamala Harris	Gavin Newsom	Alexandria Ocasio-Cortez	Jon Ossoff	Josh Shapiro	Other	Undecided
Big Data Poll	September 26–27, 2026	302 (LV)	5.3%	12.7%	21.9%	16.2%	10.1%	4.5%	7.9%	10% (Note: Gretchen Whitmer with 3.3%, Mark Kelly with 3%, Stephen A. Smith with 1.1%, "Someone else" with 2.6%)	11.5%
Emerson College	August 18–19, 2025	383 (RV)	4.3%	15.3%	6.8%	20%	8.1%	—	2.8%	25.4% (Note: Tim Walz with 7.1%, Bernie Sanders with 6.6%, JB Pritzker with 3.4%, Cory Booker with 2.7%, Gretchen Whitmer with 1.4%, Rahm Emanuel with 1.4%, Amy Klobuchar with 1%, Wes Moore with 0.5%, Ro Khanna with 0.2%, "Someone else" with 1.1%)	17.4%

== Tennessee primary ==
Poll source	Date(s) administered	Sample size	Pete Buttigieg	Kamala Harris	Mark Kelly	Gavin Newsom	Alexandria Ocasio-Cortez	Jon Ossoff	Josh Shapiro	Undecided
Targoz Market Research (Note: Poll sponsored by the Beacon Center of Tennessee)	August 15–26, 2026	385 (RV)	11%	30%	8%	18%	10%	6%	2%	15%

== Texas primary ==
Poll source	Date(s) administered	Sample size	Pete Buttigieg	Kamala Harris	Mark Kelly	Gavin Newsom	Alexandria Ocasio-Cortez	Jon Ossoff	Bernie Sanders	Other	Undecided
Big Data Poll	September 24–26, 2026	284 (LV)	10.1%	30.9%	3.9%	16.5%	9.8%	4.4%	—	15% (Note: Josh Shapiro with 3.8%, Andy Beshear with 3.3%, Stephen A. Smith with 3.1%, Gretchen Whitmer with 2.3%, "Someone else" with 2.5%)	9.3%
Overton Insights (Note: Poll sponsored by the Texas Public Policy Foundation)	August 24–26, 2026	371 (LV)	14.2%	28.4%	9.4%	11.5%	10.6%	11.6%	—	5.5% (Note: Josh Shapiro with 3.9%, Andy Beshear with 0.9%, Rahm Emanuel 0.7%)	8.8% (Note: Reported as "Would Not Vote")
Emerson College	August 11–12, 2025	370 (RV)	21.6%	16.8%	—	19.5%	5.6%	—	5.4%	16.9% (Note: Cory Booker with 3.5%, Tim Walz with 3.5%, JB Pritzker with 2.5%, Gretchen Whitmer with 1.6%, Josh Shapiro with 1.4%, Andy Beshear with 1.3%, Amy Klobuchar with 1.3%, Wes Moore with 0.7%, Rahm Emanuel with 0.3%, Ro Khanna with 0.1%, "Someone else" with 0.7%)	14.2%

== Utah primary ==
Poll source	Date(s) administered	Sample size	Cory Booker	Pete Buttigieg	Kamala Harris	Mark Kelly	Gavin Newsom	Alexandria Ocasio-Cortez	Jon Ossoff	Josh Shapiro	Other	Undecided
VoteNexus	November 12–13, 2026	815 (RV)	3%	21%	8%	9%	6%	15%	19%	3%	6% (Note: JB Pritzker with 2%, Andy Beshear with 1%, Chris Van Hollen with 1%, Wes Moore with 1%, Gretchen Whitmer with <1%, "Someone else" with 1%)	10%

== Vermont primary ==
Poll source	Date(s) administered	Sample size	Andy Beshear	Pete Buttigieg	Kamala Harris	Gavin Newsom	Alexandria Ocasio-Cortez	JB Pritzker	Bernie Sanders	Other	Undecided
University of New Hampshire	October 16–21, 2025	476 (LV)	4%	16%	6%	17%	17%	4%	14%	10% (Note: Cory Booker with 3%, Amy Klobuchar with 1%, Josh Shapiro with 1%, Gretchen Whitmer with 1%, Mark Kelly with 1%, Wes Moore with 1%, Rahm Emanuel with 0%, Ruben Gallego with 0%, Gina Raimondo with 0%, Ro Khanna with 0%, "Other" with 2%)	11%

== See also ==
- Nationwide opinion polling for the 2028 Democratic Party presidential primaries
- 2028 Democratic National Convention
- 2028 United States presidential election

== Notes ==
Polling sponsors
