= Dielman =

Dielman may refer to:

- Frederick Dielman (1847–1935), American portrait and figure painter
- Kris Dielman (born 1981), American former football guard for the San Diego Chargers
- Jeanne Dielman, 23 quai du Commerce, 1080 Bruxelles, a 1975 film by Belgian filmmaker Chantal Akerman

== See also ==
- Dalman
- Dielmann, a surname
- Dillman (disambiguation)
- Dilman
- Dolman
- Tielman (disambiguation)
