= James Tillman =

James or Jim Tillman may refer to:

- James Calvin Tillman, American former prisoner, exonerated of the crime for which he was imprisoned
- James D. Tillman (1841–1916), American Treasury official and politician
- James Fount Tillman (1854–1899), American diplomat and politician
- James H. Tillman (1869–1911), Lieutenant Governor of South Carolina
- James Tillman (baseball) (1919–2009), Negro league baseball player
- James Tillman (basketball), American basketball player
- Jim K. Tillman (1935–2012), Florida state legislator, rancher and criminologist
- Jim Tillman, American musician and member of The U-Men
