= William H. Boaz =

American politician

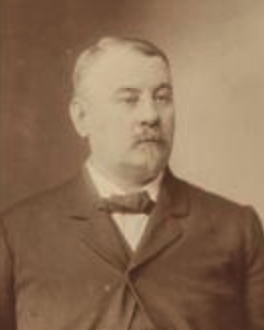

Member of the Virginia House of Delegates for Albemarle and Charlottesville
- In office December 4, 1895 – January 10, 1906
- Preceded by: John B. Moon
- Succeeded by: Thomas M. Dunn
- In office December 4, 1889 – December 2, 1891 Serving with Walter D. Dabney
- Preceded by: John S. Harris
- Succeeded by: John T. Tilman

Personal details
- Born: William Henry Boaz; July 21, 1852
- Died: March 9, 1907 (aged 54) Covesville, Virginia, U.S.
- Party: Democratic

William Henry Boaz (July 21, 1852 – March 9, 1907) was an American politician who served in the Virginia House of Delegates.
