= Innovation Illinois =

Innovation Illinois is a progressive 501(c)(4) non-profit advocacy group formed in April 2015 by leading Illinois liberals and former aides to ex-Illinois governor Pat Quinn to offset the influence of Governor Bruce Rauner, who defeated Quinn in the 2014 election. According to its website, Innovation Illinois is "dedicated to advancing well-researched, progressive policies that support economic growth and equal opportunity in the State of Illinois." A profile of an Innovation Illinois founder said the group "inevitably will be seen as a counterforce to the right-of-center Illinois Policy Institute."

Former interim CEO Michelle Saddler told Crain's Chicago Business in April 2015 that Illinois cannot just "cater to the job creators and the rich." At the time of the group's launch, it hoped to become as large as Innovation Ohio, with a staff of around 30 people.

== Leadership ==
Innovation Illinois was founded by John Kamis and Jay Rowell. It has three employees and a 15-member advisory board chaired by Christopher Kennedy, an influential Illinois Democrat and son of deceased Senator Robert F. Kennedy. According to NBC Chicago, Chris Kennedy is "making the rounds for a possible campaign" for the governor of Illinois for the 2018 election. The Chicago Sun-Times wrote that Innovation Illinois "could serve as a campaign vehicle" for Kennedy's potential gubernatorial run.

Rowell is the current Deputy Treasurer for the State of Illinois. Prior to this position, Rowell was director of the Illinois Department of Employment Security (IDES). Kamis is currently a lobbyist for Carpenter Lipps & Leland. Before becoming a lobbyist, Kamis was Senior Advisor for Economic Development and Legislative Affairs under former Governor Pat Quinn and Quinn's campaign manager for the 2010 primary.

Innovation Illinois' CEO is Michelle R.B. Sadler, former secretary of the Illinois Department of Human Services under Governor Pat Quinn.

== Funding ==
Despite its infancy, Innovation Illinois has received "hundreds of thousands of dollars" in financial backing. Because it is designated as a 501(c)(4) organization, it is able to accept unlimited corporate and personal contributions without disclosing its donors. Kamis told Crain's Chicago Business that the source of some of Innovation Illinois' funding will be publicly disclosed, but not all of it.

== Issues ==
According to its website, Innovation Illinois focuses on the issues of education, entrepreneurship and innovation, environment and sustainability, healthcare and human services, infrastructure, justice and human rights, and labor and employment.
