= Meverell L. Van Doren =

American politician

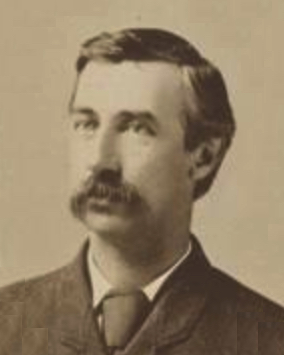
- Official portrait, 1887

Member of the Virginia House of Delegates from Albemarle County
- In office December 2, 1885 – December 8, 1887 Serving with Walter D. Dabney
- Preceded by: Thomas M. Dunn
- Succeeded by: John S. Harris

Personal details
- Born: Meverell Locke Van Doren; October 14, 1845
- Died: August 29, 1917 (aged 71) Richmond, Virginia, U.S.
- Resting place: Hollywood Cemetery
- Party: Democratic
- Spouse: Lucy Minor Maury (m. 1877; died 1915)

Military service
- Allegiance: Confederate States
- Branch/service: Confederate States Army
- Years of service: 1863–1865
- Unit: 1st Virginia Cavalry
- Battles/wars: American Civil War

Meverell Locke Van Doren (October 14, 1845 – August 29, 1917) was an American politician who served in the Virginia House of Delegates. He was married to Lucy Minor Maury, the youngest daughter of Matthew Fontaine Maury.
