= William G. Farish =

American politician

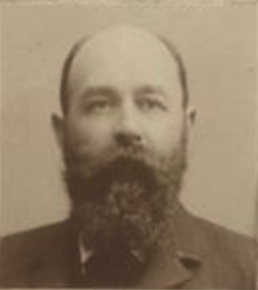

Member of the Virginia House of Delegates for Albemarle and Charlottesville
- In office December 2, 1891 – December 6, 1893 Serving with John T. Tilman
- Preceded by: Walter D. Dabney
- Succeeded by: John B. Moon

Personal details
- Born: William Gaines Farish; June 18, 1847 Albemarle, Virginia, U.S.
- Died: January 22, 1931 (aged 83) Earlysville, Virginia, U.S.
- Party: Democratic

Military service
- Allegiance: Confederate States
- Branch/service: Confederate States Army
- Rank: Private
- Battles/wars: American Civil War

William Gaines Farish (June 18, 1847 – January 22, 1931) was an American politician who served in the Virginia House of Delegates.
