= Thomas M. Dunn =

American physician and politician

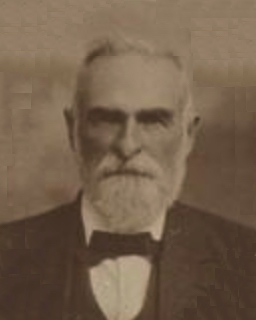

Member of the Virginia House of Delegates for Albemarle and Charlottesville
- In office January 10, 1906 – January 10, 1912 Serving with David H. Pitts
- Preceded by: William H. Boaz
- Succeeded by: John S. White
- In office December 7, 1881 – December 2, 1885 Serving with John B. Moon
- Preceded by: Thomas L. Michie
- Succeeded by: Meverell L. Van Doren
- In office December 1, 1875 – December 5, 1877 Serving with John Massey & Richard Crank
- Preceded by: Benjamin H. Magruder
- Succeeded by: J. Howard Smith

Member of the Virginia Senate from the 17th district
- In office December 4, 1889 – December 6, 1893
- Preceded by: James L. Gordon
- Succeeded by: George W. Morris

Personal details
- Born: Thomas Martin Dunn; September 1, 1836 Albemarle, Virginia, U.S.
- Died: April 4, 1916 (aged 79) Albemarle, Virginia, U.S.
- Party: Democratic
- Spouse: Sallie Shepherd Thompson
- Education: Medical College of Virginia

Military service
- Allegiance: Confederate States
- Branch/service: Confederate States Army
- Battles/wars: American Civil War

Thomas Martin Dunn (September 1, 1836 – April 4, 1916) was an American physician and politician who served in the Virginia House of Delegates and Virginia Senate.
