= John B. Moon =

American politician

Member of the Virginia House of Delegates for Albemarle and Charlottesville
- In office December 6, 1893 – December 4, 1895 Serving with John S. Harris
- Preceded by: William G. Farish
- Succeeded by: William H. Boaz
- In office December 7, 1881 – December 2, 1885 Serving with Thomas M. Dunn
- Preceded by: Richard T. W. Duke
- Succeeded by: Walter D. Dabney

Personal details
- Born: John Barclay Moon; July 20, 1849 Albemarle, Virginia, U.S.
- Died: February 20, 1915 (aged 65) Albemarle, Virginia, U.S.
- Party: Democratic
- Spouse: Marion Gordon Dabney (m. 1878)
- Education: Washington and Lee University

John Barclay Moon (July 20, 1849 – February 20, 1915) was an American lawyer and politician who served in the Virginia House of Delegates.
