= USS Tillman =

USS Tillman has been the name of two ships in the United States Navy. Both are named for Senator Benjamin Tillman.

- USS Tillman (DD-135), a Wickes-class destroyer, which served from 1921 until 1940. She was then transferred to Britain where she served as HMS Wells from 1941 until 1945.
- USS Tillman (DD-641), a Gleaves-class destroyer, serving from 1942 until 1947.
