= Dielmann =

Dielmann is a surname. Notable people with the surname include:

- Jakob Fürchtegott Dielmann (1809–1885), German illustrator and painter
- Leo M. J. Dielmann (1881–1969), American architect

== See also ==
- Dielman (disambiguation)
