= Tillemans =

Tillemans is a patronymic surname of Dutch origin from the personal name Til. Notable people with the surname include:

- Peter Tillemans (c. 1684–1734), Flemish painter
- Tom Tillemans (born 1950), Dutch-Canadian Buddhologist, Indologist, and Tibetologist

== See also ==
- Tielemans
- Tilleman
- Tillemann
