= Franklin News Foundation =

American nonprofit conservative news organization

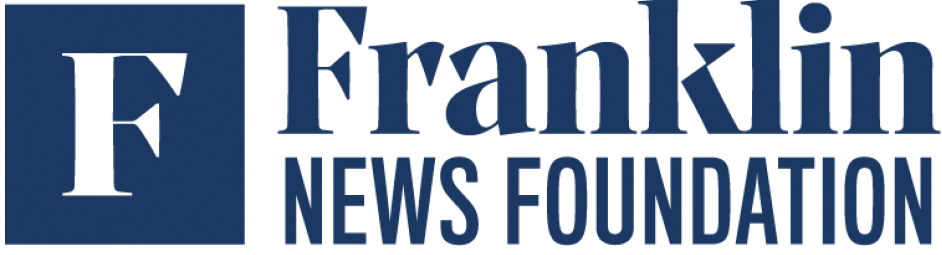
- Formation: 2009; 17 years ago
- Type: 501(c)(3) organization
- Tax ID no.: 26-4066298
- Location(s): 200 West Madison Street, Ste. 2100 Chicago, Illinois, 60606
- Key people: Christopher Krug (president)
- Revenue: $5.76 million (2024)
- Website: www.franklinnews.org

The Franklin News Foundation, previously the Franklin Center for Government and Public Integrity, is an American online nonprofit news organization that publishes news and commentary from a conservative and free market, limited government perspective on state and local politics. Its journalism platform is called The Center Square, rebranded from Watchdog.org. Founded in 2009 in North Dakota, the organization moved to Virginia and is now based in Chicago. The foundation operates Chalkboard News, America's Talking Network, and the Illinois Radio Network in addition to its newswire services.

It was associated with reporting in 41 states as of its second year, but it scaled back later in the 2010s. Its stated mission is "to hold government accountable through objective, balanced, citizen-focused public journalism with a taxpayer sensibility." Much of its funding has come from conservative and Republican-connected large donors, especially via Donors Trust. Chris Krug is the foundation's president.

== History ==
=== 2009 founding ===
The Franklin Center was founded in January 2009 with an initial sponsorship grant from the Sam Adams Alliance, a conservative think tank. It was described that year by the Associated Press as "a government watchdog group led by former Republican staffers". One of its founders was Jason Stverak, a prior executive director of the North Dakota Republican Party. The organization was originally based in Bismarck, North Dakota, before moving to Alexandria, Virginia.

In September 2009, the Franklin Center launched Watchdog.org, a network of state-based journalists who investigate and report on state and local government. Stories from the state news bureaus were linked on Watchdog.org and syndicated for newspapers.

The Franklin Center is an associate member of the State Policy Network, a consortium of conservative and libertarian think tanks which focus on state-level policy. The Franklin Center partnered with the State Policy Network to help establish news websites and hire reporters in each of the State Policy Network think tanks. Thirty news bureaus were established in the first year and 41 as of the second year, almost all in State Policy Network think tanks.

=== 2010s ===
In early 2012, the Franklin Center created a platform for citizen journalism under a banner called Watchdog Wire. As of 2013, many officials of Americans for Prosperity, a Koch-affiliated group known for its Tea Party rallies, were leading the Franklin Center, according to The Nation.

As of 2014, the Franklin Center owned 14 of the 33 ideological press outlets (as identified by a Pew Research Center study) that assigned reporters to state governments. Such ideological outlets were described as filling a void when financially struggling daily newspapers were cutting their statehouse reporters during and after the Great Recession. Governing described the Franklin Center outlets in 2014: "Some covered events in a relatively straightforward fashion; others made little effort to conceal their ideological bent. After some shake-ups and streamlining, most of the sites that didn’t become financially self-sufficient now appear under the Watchdog banner." Governing noted that the Franklin Center had been one of the largest recipients of money from groups connected to the billionaire Koch brothers.

Nicole Neily was appointed the Franklin Center’s president in March 2016. In April 2017, the Franklin Center acquired the non-profit Illinois News Network and its associated assets from the Illinois Policy Institute, a conservative think tank led by John Tillman. INN publisher Chris Krug was named President of the Franklin Center and the headquarters moving to Chicago, Illinois.

By April 2017, the Franklin Center ran just five news bureaus, in Wisconsin, Vermont, Florida, Mississippi and Arizona, at which point it underwent "reorganization". In January 2018, Krug announced that Watchdog.org would be resuming statehouse coverage based upon the Illinois News Network model.

In 2018, the Franklin Center had published almost 4,000 stories, which were republished by 44 news outlets over 12,000 times located across the US. In the same year, the Center paid Newsinator over $190,000 for advertising services.

In May 2019, the organization was renamed the Franklin News Foundation, while Watchdog.org and INN's website were replaced with The Center Square. The website's name was chosen to signify a move towards "shorter, more timely and faster-moving content" and away from long-form investigative reporting.

In 2022, FNF acquired Chalkboard Review and rebranded it Chalkboard News. The platform publishes news related to public K-12 education.

In August 2023, the FNF announced the acquisition of Advanced Digital Media (ADM), which operates BlueRoomStream.com. On 21 February 2024, FNF announced a relaunch of streaming platform BlueRoomStream.com, with ADM founders Tony and Lisa Yuscius as directors.

== Activities ==
In the past, the Franklin Center provided training for investigative reporters, state-based news organizations, public-policy institutions, and watchdog groups.

On May 10, 2011, Franklin Center journalist Lynn Campbell of IowaPolitics.com was named moderator for the 2012 Presidential Candidate Series.

In June 2012, the Franklin Center and The Heritage Foundation hosted the first annual Breitbart Awards dinner. The awards honored the life and work of the late Andrew Breitbart. Syndicated columnist and Fox News Channel contributor Michelle Malkin took home the honors in 2013.

At Conservative Political Action Conference 2013, Erik Telford of the Franklin Center served on a panel discussing "Current trends in technology." The Franklin Center ran a promotion with a Ben Franklin mascot handing out free drink tickets in exchange for tweets.

Reports in The Guardian in 2013 and 2015 said the Franklin Center was leading a "campaign against wind and solar power" and that it had not disclosed the sources of its funding.

=== GreenTech Automotive investigation and libel lawsuit ===
The Franklin Center published a series of articles that raised questions about GreenTech Automotive, founded by company CEO Charlie Wang, and its presumed chairman, Governor of Virginia Terry McAuliffe. The articles focused in part on the company’s reliance on a controversial fundraising program, EB-5, that had been criticized for its lax oversight and subject to abuse. The investigation also revealed that McAuliffe’s public projections, starting back in 2010, of how many cars would be built and jobs created had not come to fruition. In April 2013, it was revealed that McAuliffe had left the car-maker in December 2012.

GreenTech Automotive filed an $85 million libel lawsuit (noting among other things the website's characterization of GreenTech's company headquarters as "a broom closet") against Franklin Center (and a journalist for the company) in 2013. However, in 2014 a federal judge in Mississippi dismissed GreenTech's lawsuit. Wang then allegedly claimed, falsely, that Watchdog.org had paid $1.2 million in damages.

GreenTech filed for Chapter 11 bankruptcy in 2018, stating that articles from Watchdog.org “negatively affected governmental, investor and public perception of GreenTech” and led to investigations by the SEC and the Department of Homeland Security. GreenTech also blamed U.S. Senator Chuck Grassley, who had raised concerns about the company's use of the visa program, among others.

== Funding ==
As of 2012, much of the funding for the Franklin Center came from Donors Trust and Donors Capital Fund, two affiliated donor-advised funds whose funds cannot be traced to individual donors. In 2011, the two funds granted the Franklin Center US$6.3 million. The grants were 95% of the Franklin Center’s revenue that year and was the second-largest grant made by Donors Trust that year. In 2012, the two funds granted the Franklin Center nearly US$9.5 million, more than 80% of the Franklin Center’s revenue that year. For tax years 2011 through 2013, the Franklin Center received US$22 million from the two funds. In 2019, Mlive.com described Franklin as "connected to GOP mega-donors". Around 2021, DonorsTrust announced a $50,000 grant to the Franklin News Foundation to "offer an alternate perspective" on COVID-19 policies.

The Bradley Foundation had contributed nearly $800,000 to the Franklin Center's Wisconsin Watchdog as of 2017. In 2019, the Bradley Foundation contributed $250,000 to the FNF to help fund The Center Square.

== Awards and recognition ==
In November 2010, Franklin Center reporters at Maryland Reporter and Illinois Statehouse News were honored by the National Association of Capitol Reporters and Editors.

The Franklin Center's Maryland affiliate, Maryland Reporter, has won awards from the Washington chapter of the Society of Professional Journalists and from CapitolBeat, the national Association of Capitol Reporters and Editors. In 2012, Maryland Reporter was named Maryland's best political website by Baltimore Magazine. Maryland Reporter was also named one of the best state-based political blogs in the nation by the Washington Post.

In August 2011, Maryland Reporter was awarded a $50,000 grant by the Ethics and Excellence in Journalism Foundation to provide "in-depth coverage of Maryland state government and politics and to expand capacity by giving those who plan on entering journalism as a career real-world experience in investigative reporting supervised by veteran journalists."

Franklin affiliates CapitolBeatOK in Oklahoma, Hawaii Reporter, and the New Jersey Watchdog blog have won awards from respective state chapters of the Society of Professional Journalists. New Jersey Watchdog has also won two New York Press Club awards.
