= Tilmann =

Tilmann is a given name. Notable people with the name include:

- Tilmann Buddensieg (1928-2013), German art historian
- Tilmann Wröbel (born 1964), Franco-German fashion designer

== See also ==
- Tillmann, given name and surname
- Tilman, given name and surname
