= The Center Square =

U.S. conservative news network

- Type: State and local government reporting
- Owner: Franklin News Foundation
- Founded: September 2009
- Political alignment: Conservative
- Language: English
- Readership: 700,000 subscribers
- Website: www.thecentersquare.com

The Center Square, formerly Watchdog.org, is an American news website that features reporting on state and local governments. It is a project of the Franklin News Foundation, an American conservative online nonprofit news organization. The Center Square distributes its content through a newswire service.

As Watchdog.org, it broke a story about website data inaccuracies for the American Recovery and Reinvestment Act of 2009 that appeared to show "phantom congressional districts".

== Background ==
The Center Square is a project of the Franklin News Foundation (formerly called the Franklin Center for Government and Public Integrity), an American conservative online nonprofit news organization. The Columbia Journalism Review in 2012 called the Franklin Center "perhaps the most ambitious conservative news organization you’ve never heard of", said its productivity was "impressive," and noted the original news reporting produced by websites it funded in 18 states at the time.

The Franklin Center, a 501(c)(3) nonprofit organization, received 95% of its 2011 revenue from mostly anonymous benefactors via the American nonprofit donor-advised fund Donors Trust, which is a major source of funding for conservative groups.

== Watchdog.org ==
In 2012, Watchdog.org had sites in 18 states. In 2014, the Franklin Center said it had one reporter in each of 14 state capitols and two in Nebraska and Virginia. In 2015, most of the Watchdog sites had one staff reporter in addition to accepting contributions from citizen journalists via a platform called Watchdog Wire.

The Project for Excellence in Journalism of the Pew Research Center surveyed and analyzed nonprofit news organizations active on the state or national level in 2011 and again in 2013. The studies found that the most consistently ideological of the news outlets were those that were organized in networks, specifically the conservative Watchdog network and the liberal American Independent News Network.

=== American Recovery and Reinvestment Act ===
Watchdog.org sites scrutinized the American Recovery and Reinvestment Act of 2009 for evidence that it had misreported or overpaid for the number of jobs saved. According to the Washington Monthly, such reports by Watchdog.org could be factual but also "thin and missing important context".

Watchdog.org became known for stories about "phantom congressional districts" based on data entry errors on the stimulus website Recovery.gov. In November 2009, Jim Scarantino of Watchdog New Mexico wrote that data he found on the stimulus website showed millions of federal stimulus dollars marked for congressional districts that did not exist. The national Watchdog.org site said that nationally more than $6.4 billion had gone to such "phantom" districts. The reports were publicized by Republicans and conservative news outlets and think tanks, and ABC News claimed the story as a "network exclusive". According to the Associated Press, "Soon, the 'phantom' congressional district story became shorthand for government waste." Reporting by the Associated Press concluded that mistyping of ZIP Codes on the stimulus website had caused the discrepancies; it found examples of funds that had been delivered to real districts but had been misreported on the website. It credited Scarantino with uncovering the inaccuracies, calling it "the latest discovery of problems in the massive database of stimulus spending", while noting that "anyone with a computer can still easily find out the name of the business or agency that received the money".

=== GreenTech Automotive investigation and libel lawsuit ===
GreenTech Automotive filed an $85 million libel lawsuit (noting among other things the website's characterization of GreenTech's company headquarters as "a broom closet") against Watchdog.org and its parent (and a journalist for the company) in 2013. However, in 2014 a federal judge in Mississippi dismissed GreenTech's lawsuit.

GreenTech filed for Chapter 11 bankruptcy in 2018, stating that articles from Watchdog.org "negatively affected governmental, investor and public perception of GreenTech" and led to investigations by the SEC and the Department of Homeland Security.
