= Tillmann =

Tillmann is a surname and given name of German and Danish origin. Variants of the name include Tilman, Tillman, and Dillman. Notable people with the name Tillmann include:

== Surname ==
- Adrian Julius Tillmann (born 1997), German actor
- Angela Tillmann (1957–2025), German politician
- Antje Tillmann (born 1964), German politician
- Fritz Tillmann (1910–1986), German actor
- Jean-Jacques Tillmann (1935–2015), Swiss news reporter
- John Tillmann (1961–2018), Canadian art thief
- Sean Tillmann (born 1978), singer better known as Har Mar Superstar
- Timothy Tillman (born 1999), German-American professional soccer-player
- Ulrike Tillmann (born 1962), German-born mathematician

== Given name ==
- Tillmann Grove (born 1988), German soccer-player
- Tillmann Lohse (fl. 2003–2017), German author, editor, academic, and scholar of Medieval History
- Tillmann Uhrmacher (1967–2011), German DJ

== See also ==
- Tillman, surname and given name
- Tilmann, given name
