= Tillemann =

Tillemann is a patronymic surname of German origin from the personal name Til. Notable people with the surname include:

- Charity Sunshine Tillemann-Dick (1983–2019), American soprano and presenter
- Johann Martin Tillemann, co-owner of the merchant bank Seyler & Tillemann
- Levi Tillemann (born 1981), American businessman, academic, and author

== See also ==
- Tilleman
- Tillemans
