= Illinois Policy Institute =

Libertarian think tank

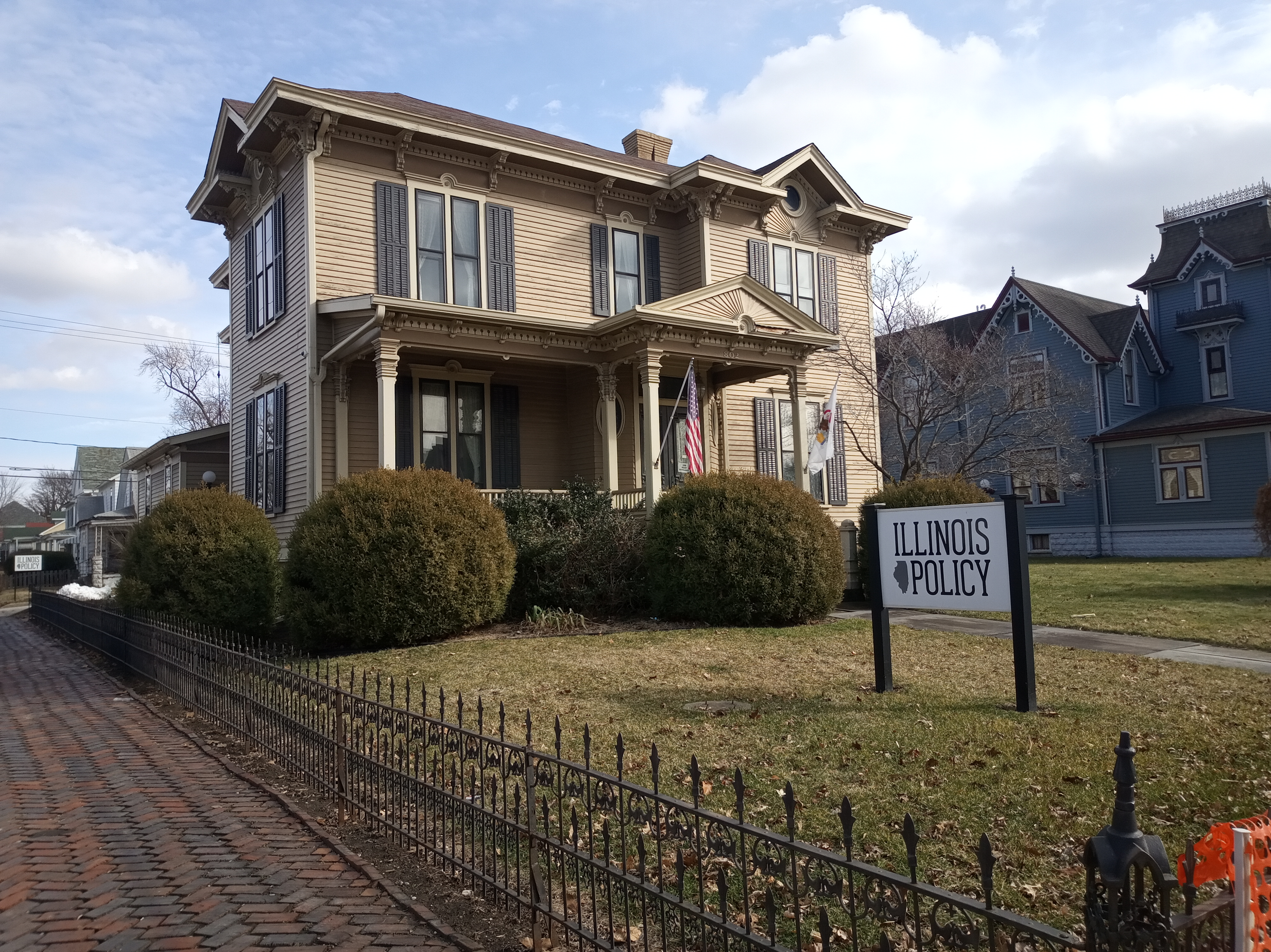
- Former office of the Illinois Policy Institute in Springfield
- Formation: 2002
- Founder: Greg Blankenship
- CEO: Matt Paprocki
- Revenue: $8.09 million (2024)
- Expenses: $7.48 million (2024)
- Website: www.illinoispolicy.org

The Illinois Policy Institute (IPI) is a free market nonprofit think tank based in Chicago. Founded in 2002, it is active in the areas of education policy, pension policy, and state budget issues. IPI advocates for smaller government and lower taxes. It has an affiliated lobbying arm and legal arm. IPI is a member of the State Policy Network, a consortium of free-market think tanks in the U.S.

== History ==
Originally founded by Greg Blankenship, the organization was relaunched by John Tillman in 2007. It expanded its work and influence after Tillman took over. IPI raised $341,000 in 2007 and $6.4 million in 2016. In 2018, the Chicago Sun-Times wrote that "Its studies and opinion pieces on cutting government spending and boosting transparency became must-read material to many Republicans, some Democrats — and the governor of Illinois." IPI was described by ProPublica Illinois as "arguably the most influential conservative organization in the state." The Chicago Sun-Times described the group as "leading a crusade against government regulations, state spending and labor unions in Illinois."

IPI formerly operated the Illinois News Network, transferring ownership of that entity to the Franklin Center for Government and Public Integrity in January 2018. IPI has received financial support from charitable foundations associated with the Koch, Mercer, Uihlein, and Rauner families.

== Operations ==
The group worked closely with former Illinois Governor Bruce Rauner, a Republican and past donor to IPI, during the first several years of his gubernatorial tenure. However, Rauner's relationship with IPI deteriorated in part due to an article by ProPublica Illinois and the Chicago Sun-Times which reported that IPI's leadership had "moved millions of dollars around five interconnected nonprofits they run, steering money to for-profit ventures in which they have a stake." Tilllman denied any wrongdoing, saying "Obviously, these are all fully disclosed transactions, all at fair market value as they should be."
