= USS Tillman (DD-135) =

Wickes-class destroyer

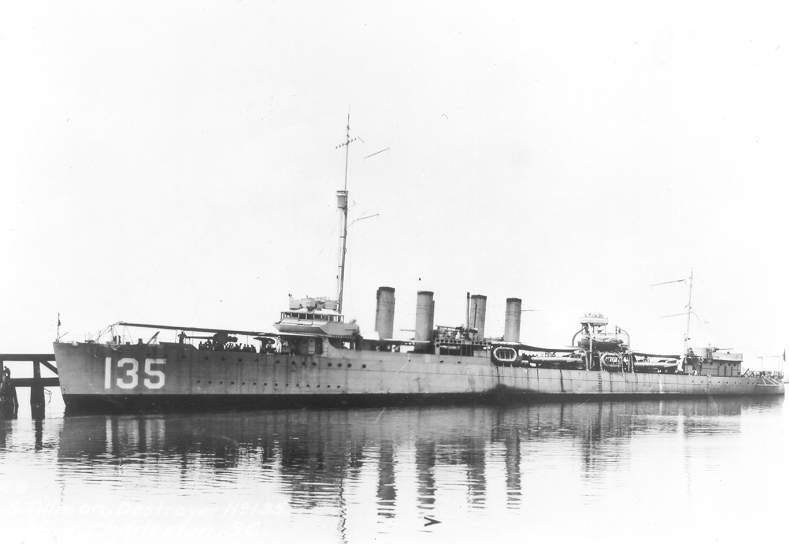
- USS Tillman (DD-135)

History

United States
- Name: USS Tillman
- Namesake: Benjamin Tillman
- Builder: Charleston Navy Yard
- Laid down: 29 July 1918
- Launched: 7 July 1919
- Commissioned: 10 April 1921
- Decommissioned: 3 July 1922
- Recommissioned: 1 May 1930
- Decommissioned: 15 June 1939
- Recommissioned: 24 August 1940
- Decommissioned: 26 November 1940
- Stricken: 8 January 1941
- Identification: DD-135
- Fate: Transferred to UK, 26 November 1940

United Kingdom
- Name: HMS Wells
- Acquired: 26 November 1940
- Commissioned: 5 December 1940
- Decommissioned: 24 July 1945
- Identification: Pennant number: I95
- Fate: Scrapped, 24 July 1945

General characteristics
- Class & type: Wickes-class destroyer
- Displacement: 1,191 tons
- Length: 314 ft 4 1/2 in (95.822 m)
- Beam: 31 ft 8 in (9.65 m)
- Draft: 9 ft 8 1/4 in (2.953 m)
- Propulsion: Twin screws, four steam boilers with superheat, four funnels
- Speed: 35 knots (65 km/h)
- Complement: 122 officers and enlisted
- Armament: 4 × 4 in (102 mm)/50 guns; 2 × 3 in (76 mm)/23 gun; 12 × 21 inch (533 mm) torpedo tubes; 1 × Y-gun depth charge projector

The first USS Tillman (DD–135) was a Wickes-class destroyer in the United States Navy. She was named for Senator Benjamin Tillman. Transferred to the United Kingdom in World War II, she was commissioned in the Royal Navy as HMS Wells (I 95).

== United States Navy ==
Tillman was laid down on 29 July 1918 by the Charleston Navy Yard; launched on 7 July 1919; sponsored by Miss Mary Y. Tillman the granddaughter of Senator Tillman; re-classified DD-135 on 17 July 1920, during the Navy-wide assignment of alphanumeric hull numbers; and commissioned on 10 April 1921.

Following shakedown, Tillman operated out of Charleston Navy Yard with Division 20, Squadron 9, Destroyer Flotilla 1, U.S. Atlantic Fleet, until the summer of 1921. Operating with half of her normal complement by the following winter, the destroyer trained and cruised with Division 33, Squadron 8, Atlantic Fleet Destroyer Squadrons into the spring of 1922. Soon thereafter, Tillman was decommissioned on 3 July 1922 and laid up at the Philadelphia Navy Yard.

After almost eight years of inactivity, Tillman was placed back in commission at Philadelphia on 1 May 1930. Returning to Charleston, the destroyer operated with Division 23, Squadron 7, of the Scouting Fleet Destroyer Squadrons. Transferred to Division 48 by 1 January 1931, Tillman conducted training cruises for naval reserve trainees and NROTC midshipmen until late in the spring of 1933, when she shifted to Boston to train reservists and NROTC midshipmen of the 1st Naval District.

As part of the Scouting Fleet Training Squadron, Tillman eventually returned to the Charleston Navy Yard and alternated tours of active training duty with periods moored in "rotating reserve." On 1 January 1934, she returned to full-time active duty with the Training Squadron and resumed training cruises. The destroyer continued to alternate periods in the rotating reserve with assignments to training duty into the late 1930s. Later assigned to Destroyer Division (DesDiv) 29 of Destroyer Squadron (DesRon) 10, she worked out of Charleston and Boston, training reservists and NROTC midshipmen, participating in Fleet landing exercises in the Caribbean; conducting battle practices and drills; and showing the flag at ports along the eastern seaboard and in the Caribbean. She continued this schedule until she was again decommissioned on 15 June 1939.

Two and one-half months later, German forces attacked Poland, triggering World War II in Europe. Early in the spring of 1940, the tide turned against the Allies, as Germany launched a devastatingly successful blitzkrieg. In addition, German U-boats terrorized transatlantic convoys and took heavy tolls of merchantmen and escorts alike. By summer, the United Kingdom was the last country in Europe still at war with Hitler, with only the English Channel between her and the Germans.

The Royal Navy's destroyer forces had suffered losses in the Atlantic, as well as in the Norwegian debacle and the evacuation of Dunkirk. At this point, the newly installed prime minister, Winston Churchill, appealed to President Franklin D. Roosevelt for help. Accordingly, on 23 July 1940, the two leaders reached the Destroyers for Bases Agreement, whereby the United States would transfer 50 overaged flush-decked destroyers to the British in return for 99-year leases on sites for strategic bases in the Western Hemisphere.

As one of the 50 ships, Tillman was recommissioned at Philadelphia on 24 August 1940. About three months later, she moved up the coast to Halifax, Nova Scotia, the transfer point for the "50 ships that saved the world." On 21 November 1940, she arrived at that port with the remainder of her division, DesDiv 72, the last group of ships to be turned over to the Royal and Royal Canadian Navies.

== Royal Navy ==
Decommissioned on 26 November 1940, Tillman's name was struck from the US Navy list on 8 January 1941. Commissioned in the Royal Navy as HMS Wells (I 95) on 5 December 1940, the destroyer suffered damage on the 9th in a collision with sister ship HMS Newmarket. She was thus unable to sail for the British Isles until 4 February 1941. Getting underway on that date in company with HMS Newark, Wells encountered a heavy gale in which she lost her topmast. Newark soon suffered engine failure and had to be towed back to Halifax.

Wells eventually arrived in the United Kingdom and was soon assigned to the 17th Destroyer Division, which provided escorts for the 1st Minelaying Squadron. During this time, she carried out a number of mining operations off the western coast of Scotland.

Between these operations, Wells escorted convoys to and from Iceland. On 10 June 1941, while operating south of this strategic isle, she attacked a U-boat but without success. Two days later, she encountered another U-boat and went to the attack, but the explosion of her own depth charges damaged her and forced her to give up the search.

Following refitting at Hull, England, in the autumn of 1941, Wells returned to convoy escort duty. Wells was modified for trade convoy escort service by removal of three of the original 4"/50 caliber guns and one of the triple torpedo tube mounts to reduce topside weight for additional depth charge stowage and installation of Hedgehog anti-submarine mortars. On 16 January 1942, she intercepted an SOS from SS R. J. Cullen—an American merchantman which had run aground on the southeast side of Barra Island, in the Outer Hebrides, west of Scotland. Heavy seas initially made launching a boat a virtual impossibility, but Wells stood by until lifeboats and tugs arrived and transported the steamer's crew safely ashore.

While escorting two transports later that spring, Wells and HMS Brighton were bombed by German aircraft west of the Faroe Islands, but escaped damage. During November, Wells conducted convoy escort operations with Convoy KX-6, supporting Operation "Torch", the invasion of North Africa, and returned to the United Kingdom in December with Convoy MKF-3 to resume escort duties with Iceland-bound convoys.

After serving another tour of convoy escort and minelaying escort duties, Wells was transferred to Rosyth in August 1943 and operated with the Rosyth Escort Force, screening coastwise convoys between the Firth of Forth and the Thames estuary. Early in 1945, after refitting at the Clyde in late 1944, she became a target ship for aircraft training with the Western Approaches Command, a role in which she served until reduced to reserve status at Greenock after World War II, in mid-1945. Decommissioned in July 1945, Wells was subsequently scrapped at Troon, on 24 July 1945.
