= Tilman =

Tilman is both a masculine given name and a surname. The German version of the surname is Tillmann. Other variants include Tillman and Dillman.

Notable people with the name include:

== People with the given name ==
- Tilman Fertitta (1957), American businessman
- Tilman Goins, American politician from Tennessee
- Tilman Michael, German chorus master
- Tilman Bacon Parks (1872–1950), American politician from Arkansas
- Tilman Pesch (1836–1899), German Jesuit philosopher
- Tilman Riemenschneider (1460–1531), German sculptor and woodcarver
- Tilman Valentin "Til" Schweiger (born 1963), German actor, director, and producer
- Saint Tilman (c. 608–702), French priest, abbot and hermit

== People with the surname ==
- Bill Tilman (1898–1977), English mountaineer and explorer
- G. David Tilman (born 1949), American ecologist
- Felicia Tilman, fictional character in the television series Desperate Housewives
- Manuel Tilman, East Timorese politician

== See also ==
- Tillman, surname and given name
- Tilmann, given name
