= Walter D. Dabney =

American politician

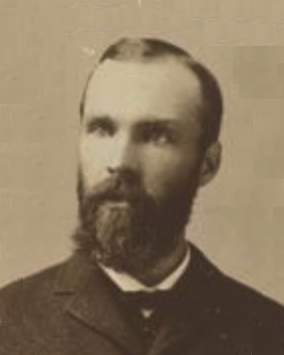
- Official portrait, 1887

Member of the Virginia House of Delegates from Albemarle County
- In office December 2, 1885 – December 2, 1891
- Preceded by: John B. Moon
- Succeeded by: William G. Farish

Personal details
- Born: Walter Davis Dabney; May 13, 1853 Albemarle, Virginia, U.S.
- Died: March 12, 1899 (aged 45) Charlottesville, Virginia, U.S.
- Resting place: University of Virginia Cemetery
- Party: Democratic
- Spouse: Mary Brumfield Douglas
- Education: University of Virginia (LLB)
- Occupation: Law professor; politician

Walter Davis Dabney (May 13, 1853 – March 12, 1899) was an American lawyer, law professor, and politician who served in the Virginia House of Delegates.
