= John McLaughlin (pollster) =

American pollster

John McLaughlin is an American pollster known for his work for conservative politicians. He has worked for President Donald Trump for over a decade, including on his election campaigns in 2016, 2020, and 2024.

== Career ==
John McLaughlin began his career in polling by working for Arthur J. Finkelstein in the 1980s. He then created an independent polling firm with Tony Fabrizio, and soon after established his own firm, McLaughlin & Associates.

In 2002, he was hired to work for the UK Conservative Party. Other past clients include Israeli Prime Minister Benjamin Netanyahu. McLaughlin also worked on then-House majority leader Eric Cantor's 2014 re-election campaign, and produced polls suggesting that Cantor was comfortably ahead in primary campaigning. Cantor lost the Republican primary in an upset, and McLaughlin's polls were off by 45 points from the actual result. New York magazine reported that McLaughlin was "notorious for producing rosy polling data on behalf of his clients."

=== Work for Donald Trump ===
John McLaughlin first worked for Donald Trump in 2011, when Trump was considering running for president. The two were introduced by Dick Morris, and McLaughlin aided Trump in making plans for a possible campaign. McLaughlin subsequently worked on Trump's 2016, 2020, and 2024 presidential campaigns. In 2016, it was reported that McLaughlin focused his campaign efforts on New York state. By the 2020 election, The Hill deemed McLaughlin and his brother, Jim, "Trump's most trusted pollsters". For the 2024 election, McLaughlin & Associates was one of two companies that conducted polls for Trump.

Europe Elects's Pollster Watch page notes that the platform does not include the pollster in its polling average for North Macedonia, citing the company's surveying methodology as unclear. During the 2026 Hungarian election campaign, the company signalled a victory for Trump's ally Viktor Orbán, who lost to the opposition in a landslide a few days later.
