= James Tillman (baseball) =

American baseball player

- Catcher
- Born: December 3, 1919; Washington, D.C.
- Died: May 31, 2009 (aged 89); Capitol Heights, Maryland
- Batted: Right Threw: Right

Teams
- Homestead Grays (1941–1943)

James Pinckney Tillman Sr. (December 3, 1919 – May 31, 2009) was an American catcher who played in Negro league baseball. He batted and threw right handed.

== Biography ==
Born in the Washington, D.C. area, Tillman grew up following the Washington Senators team, while playing pick-up baseball games in the streets with his friends using a broomstick for a bat.

Later, he played for minor black ball clubs before joining the Homestead Grays of the Negro National League, a powerhouse franchise that split its home games between Pittsburgh and Washington, D.C.

From 1941 through 1943, Tillman was a backup for incumbent Josh Gibson, widely known as "the Black Babe Ruth." Additionally, Tillman had the task of filling in for Gibson whenever the latter played in the Puerto Rican Professional Baseball League.

Afterwards in 1947, Tillman played with the Charlotte Black Hornets of the Negro Carolina League before moving back to his homeland and playing with teams based in Rockville, Maryland (ACs) and Washington, D.C. (Aztecs). By then, Negro league teams began folding due to Major League Baseball recruiting of black players after Jackie Robinson broke the color barrier with the Brooklyn Dodgers in 1947.

After his playing days ended, Tillman joined the Chariot Singers, a gospel music group based in Washington, D.C. that performed at local churches. He also worked as a truck driver for W.D. Campbell Furniture Company. After settling in Capitol Heights, Maryland, he worked in D.C. florist shops, retiring once in 1982, then returning to work in 1984 before finally retiring in 2000.

Tillman eventually achieved local and national honors recognizing his contributions to the Negro leagues and the game of baseball. Among his contributions, Tillman delivered his first speech in 1998 to students of Cardozo Senior High School in the district. He later traveled to black baseball memorabilia events across the country in 2002 to sign autographs and meet baseball enthusiasts.

Tillman received his due recognition in February 2008, when he was honored by the U.S. Department of State during Black History Month. Four months later, he was selected by the Pittsburgh Pirates in the special draft of the surviving Negro league players, an event staged by Major League Baseball where each MLB club selected a former NLB player.

Tillman died in 2009 in Capitol Heights, Maryland at the age of 89, following complications from a stroke.
