= John Tillman (policy) =

American conservative activist

John Michael Tillman
- Born: Fremont, Michigan
- Education: B.B.A. (1983)
- Alma mater: Wayne State University
- Occupation: Public policy
- Organization: Hall of Giants
- Website: https://hallofgiants.org/

John Tillman is an American political strategist and the founder and CEO of the Hall of Giants, a museum and cultural institution focused on entrepreneurship. He has held leadership and board roles with public policy think tanks, including the Illinois Policy Institute.

== Career ==
Tillman held roles with Americans for Limited Government and the Sam Adams Alliance.

In 2011, Tillman won the Roe Award from the State Policy Network, which recognizes figures in the state-level free-market policy movement.

In 2014, he joined the board of the National Taxpayers Union.

Tillman runs the American Culture Project, which was founded in 2019. According to The Washington Post, fundraising materials and internal communications described the organization as seeking to improve Republican electoral prospects in the 2022 elections. He and Warlander Asset Management sued Illinois officials in 2019, alleging the state had issued debt in violation of the Illinois Constitution. In 2020, an Illinois appellate court reinstated the litigation, the lawsuit to proceed.

Tillman also runs the Franklin News Foundation. According to The Washington Post, the foundation received a grant during the COVID-19 pandemic for coverage and commentary highlighting opposition to COVID-19 public health restrictions.

In 2026, he founded Hall of Giants, a proposed museum and cultural institution focused on entrepreneurship. Entrepreneur reported that the project planned a temporary pavilion on the National Mall and a later traveling exhibition.
