= Tilleman =

Tilleman is a patronymic surname of Dutch origin from the personal name Til. Notable people with the surname include:

- Donald Tilleman (1919–1972), American mayor
- Karl Tilleman (born 1960), Canadian former basketball player
- Mike Tilleman (1944–2020), American football player

== See also ==
- Tillemann
- Tillemans
