= John T. Tilman =

American politician (1845–1905)

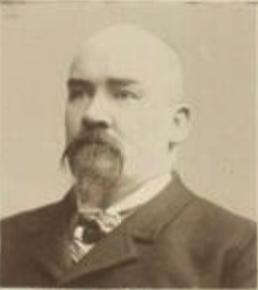

Member of the Virginia House of Delegates for Albemarle and Charlottesville
- In office December 2, 1891 – December 6, 1893 Serving with William G. Farish
- Preceded by: William H. Boaz
- Succeeded by: John S. Harris

Personal details
- Born: John Thomas Tilman; July 10, 1845
- Died: February 28, 1905 (aged 59)
- Party: Democratic

Military service
- Allegiance: Confederate States
- Branch/service: Confederate States Army
- Years of service: 1865
- Rank: Private
- Battles/wars: American Civil War

John Thomas Tilman (July 10, 1845 – February 28, 1905) was an American politician who served in the Virginia House of Delegates.
