= Thiemann =

Thiemann is a surname. Notable people with the surname include:

- Carl Thiemann (1881–1966), Bohemian printmaker
- Elsa Thiemann (1910–1981), German photographer
- Hugo Thiemann (1917–2012), Swiss electronics engineer
- Johannes Thiemann (born 1994), German basketball player
- Ronald Frank Thiemann (1946–2012), American academic

== See also ==
- Thiemann Scott Offutt (1872–1943), justice of the Maryland Court of Appeals
