= James Calvin Tillman =

James Calvin Tillman (born 1961) is a man who was wrongfully convicted of rape, and served 18.5 years in prison before being exonerated by DNA testing on July 11, 2006. Tillman, of East Hartford Connecticut, was convicted of kidnapping in the first degree, sexual assault in the first degree, robbery and assault in the third degree in 1989, and freed in 2007.

== Crime ==
Tillman, a black man, was wrongfully convicted for an attack on a white woman in Hartford, Connecticut that occurred on January 22, 1988. The victim entered her car in an outdoor parking lot at approximately 12:45 A.M. after leaving a bar. Her attacker opened the driver's side door of her car and raped her.

== Judicial appeal ==
Tillman appealed the conviction in the Supreme Court of Connecticut in 1991 (220 Conn. 487, 600 A.2d 738). The Supreme Court upheld the conviction finding that the jury array was not unconstitutionally assembled, alleged errors in jury instruction did not warrant a new trial and certain field notes were not improperly excluded from evidence.

Tillman argued that the jury selection was improper because court clerks had excused a number of potential jurors due to financial hardship. He claimed that the minority candidates were more likely to face this hardship and that this contributed to the fact that there were no African American males on his jury. The court noted that in a murder trial that drew from the same array there were three black persons chosen to serve.

Tillman also raised several issues regarding instructions to the jury. When considering the victim's testimony he had requested that the jury be told that they "may consider...whether the witness was physically impaired or under stress when observing the perpetrator." The jury might have found the victim to have been impaired because she had been drinking and because she had a large cut over her eye that required seven stitches and eventually closed the eye completely. The court instead instructed the jury that it could assess the victim's "ability to observe facts correctly...degree of stress...and opportunity to observe the person." In addition he challenged the court's decision not to limit his own contradictory statement to a police detective. The detective testified that he asked Tillman how he got some cuts and bruises on the major knuckles of his hands. The defendant originally said that he was not sure but later said that he did not get them from "punching no girl". The detective had not told Tillman that the victim had been punched; however he had shown him a picture of the girl after her attack from which he could reasonably deduce that fact. Tillman was not allowed to raise this point on appeal.

The final argument in Tillman's appeal was that the court had improperly excluded a notebook containing field notes from a police department social worker. The notes did not pass proper evidentiary requirements. Within the notes was a statement from the lead detective on the case indicating that fingerprints not matching Tillman's were found on the driver's side door of the vehicle, where the perpetrator had entered. The finding was reported in court as being fingerprints on the passenger side door.

== Verdict upheld ==
Tillman's verdict was affirmed in 1991 and again in 1999 when he claimed ineffective assistance of counsel before the Appellate Court of Connecticut (54 Conn.App. 749, 738 A.2d 208). The main holding in that case was that counsel did not have to press every conceivable argument during a case but should focus on a few strong arguments.

== Exoneration ==
In 2007 DNA testing organized by the Innocence Project was performed on semen found on the victim's pantyhose. After excluding the DNA of the victim's husband, the study found five different samples of DNA, all identified as coming from the same unknown individual and inconsistent with Tillman's DNA, leading to his exoneration and release 18 years into the 45-year sentence.

== Aftermath ==
James Tillman worked as a clerk at the Capitol Region Education Council (CREC), mentors at-risk children and has served in ministry for the Hopewell Baptist Church. The Governor of Connecticut offered him $500,000 in compensation for his wrongful incarceration. Several members of the state legislature introduced a bill to provide Tillman with total compensation of $5,000,000 for the 18.5 years that he wrongfully spent in jail.

On May 16, 2007, the Connecticut legislature unanimously voted to present Tillman with $5 million to assist him in living comfortably following his wrongful imprisonment. The legislature stated that they were touched by his attitude following his release.

== See also ==
- List of wrongful convictions in the United States
