= John Tillman (triple jumper) =

American triple jumper

Personal information
- Nationality: American
- Born: February 11, 1965 (age 61)

Sport
- Sport: Athletics
- Event: Triple jump

John Tillman (born February 11, 1965) is an American athlete. He competed in the men's triple jump at the 1992 Summer Olympics. Tillman attended Parkwood High School in Monroe, North Carolina, where he was the 1983 NCHSAA state champion in the triple jump. He then attended the University of Tennessee, where he was a six-time All-American.
