= Thielemann =

Thielemann is a German surname. Notable people with the surname include:

- Alfred Thielemann (1869–1954), Norwegian sport shooter
- Christian Thielemann (born 1959), German conductor
- Ferdinand Thielemann (1803–1863), Danish architect
- Friedrich-Karl Thielemann (born 1951), German/Swiss theoretical astrophysicist
- Heino Thielemann (1923–2015), German field hockey player
- R. C. Thielemann (born 1955), former American football player
- Ronny Thielemann (born 1973), former German football player
- Ursula Thielemann (born 1960), former German field hockey player

== See also ==
- 17882 Thielemann, main-belt asteroid, named after John Seth Thielemann (born 1986)
