= Dillman =

Dillman may refer to:

== People with the surname ==
- August Dillmann (1823–1894), German Orientalist
- Grover C. Dillman (1889–1979), American engineer and politician
- Bradford Dillman (1930–2018), American actor
- George Dillman, creator of Kyusho jitsu
- Meredith Dillman, American fantasy artist and illustrator

== Other uses ==
- Dillman, Indiana, an unincorporated community in Wells County
- Dillman, Missouri, an unincorporated community
- Dillman (Brooklyn Nine-Nine), an episode of Brooklyn Nine-Nine
