= 2004 Seattle Seahawks season =

American football team season

- Owner: Paul Allen
- General manager: Bob Ferguson
- Head coach: Mike Holmgren
- Home stadium: Qwest Field

Results
- Record: 9–7
- Division place: 1st NFC West
- Playoffs: Lost Wild Card Playoffs (vs. Rams) 20–27
- All-Pros: RB Shaun Alexander (2nd team); OT Walter Jones (1st team); OG Steve Hutchinson (2nd team)
- Pro Bowlers: RB Shaun Alexander; OT Walter Jones; OG Steve Hutchinson

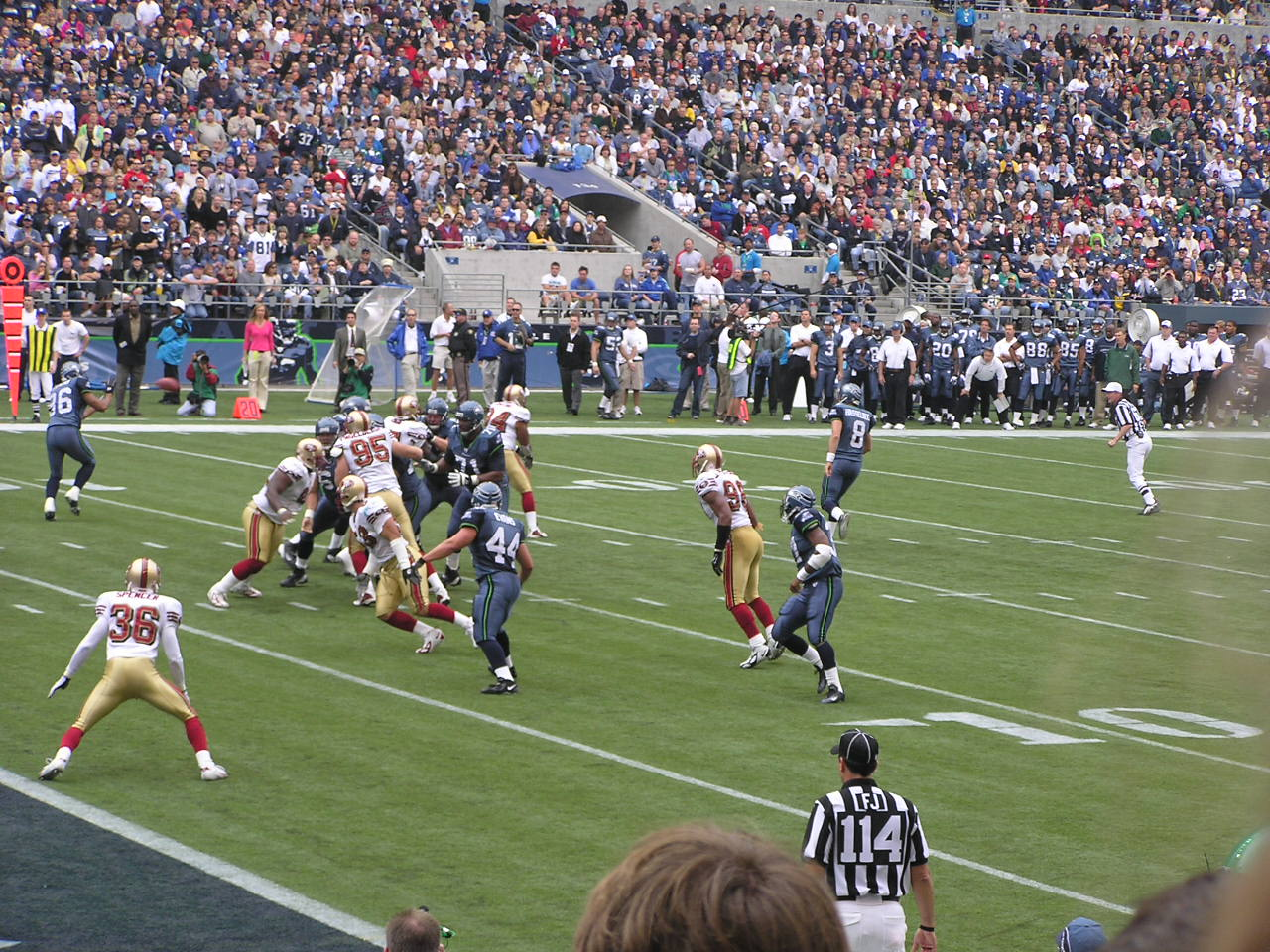
The Seahawks in the red zone in their week 3 shutout of San Francisco, September 26

The 2004 Seattle Seahawks season was the franchise's 29th season in the National Football League (NFL), the third season in Qwest Field and the 6th under head coach Mike Holmgren. Finishing the season at 9–7, the Seahawks were unable to replicate the year they had prior.

This was the first of four consecutive NFC West titles for the Seahawks. In the Wild Card round, they faced off against the divisional rival St. Louis Rams, who swept them 2–0 in the regular season. Seattle looked to avenge their two losses, but it was too late as Matt Hasselbeck's game-tying drive to Bobby Engram was incomplete, leading Hasselbeck to his knees and punch the turf in frustration. The Seahawks lost 27–20. The Rams, despite a mediocre 8–8 record, advanced to the Divisional round the following week, only to lose to Michael Vick's Atlanta Falcons in a 47–17 blowout.

On October 20, 2004, the Seahawks traded a conditional 2005 7th-round pick (condition failed) to the Oakland Raiders in exchange for Jerry Rice.

== Draft ==
2004 Seattle Seahawks draft
Round	Pick	Player	Position	College	Notes
1	23	Marcus Tubbs	DT	Texas	
2	53	Michael Boulware	SS	Florida St	
3	84	Sean Locklear	OT	NC State	
4	116	Niko Koutouvides	LB	Purdue	
5	157	D.J. Hackett	WR	Colorado	
6	189	Craig Terrill	DT	Purdue	
7	224	Donnie Jones	P	LSU	
Made roster † Pro Football Hall of Fame * Made at least one Pro Bowl during career

== Personnel ==
2004 Seattle Seahawks staff
Front Office: Chairman – Paul Allen; President – Bob Whitsitt; Executive Vice President of Football Operations/General Manager – Mike Holmgren; Senior Vice President – Mike Reinfeldt; Vice President of Football Operations – Ted Thompson; General Manager - Bob Ferguson; Director of Player Personnel – John Schneider; Director of Pro Personnel – Will Lewis; Director of College Scouting – Scot McCloughan; Scouting Assistant - Chris Culmer; Football Operations Coordinator / Team Travel - Bill Nayes; Head Coaches: Head Coach – Mike Holmgren; Assistant Head Coach/Offensive Line – Tom Lovat; Area Scout - Scott Fitterer; Bill Walsh Diversity Coaching Fellowship - Grady Brown; Offensive Coaches: Offensive Coordinator – Gil Haskell; Quarterbacks – Jim Zorn; Running Backs – Stump Mitchell; Wide Receivers – Nolan Cromwell; Tight Ends – Jim Lind; Offensive Line - Bill Laveroni; Quality Control / Offensive Assistant – Gary Reynolds	Defensive Coaches: Defensive Coordinator – Ray Rhodes; Defensive Line – Dwaine Board; Assistant Quality Control / Defensive Line - Zerick Rollins; Linebackers – John Marshall; Defensive Backs – Teryl Austin; Special Teams Coaches: Special Teams Coordinator – Mark Michaels; Strength and Conditioning: Strength and Conditioning – Kent Johnston; Assistant Strength and Conditioning – Rod Springer

== Roster ==
2004 Seattle Seahawks roster
**Quarterbacks (QB)**: 4 Trent Dilfer; **8** Matt Hasselbeck; 15 Seneca Wallace; **Running backs (RB)**: **37** Shaun Alexander; 32 Kerry Carter; 44 Heath Evans FB; 20 Maurice Morris; **38** Mack Strong FB; **Wide receivers (WR)**: **84** Bobby Engram; **82** Darrell Jackson; **80** Jerry Rice; 81 Koren Robinson; 89 Jerheme Urban; 87 Taco Wallace; 14 Jason Willis; **Tight ends (TE)**: 83 Ryan Hannam; **88** Itula Mili; 86 Jerramy Stevens	**Offensive linemen (OL)**: **62** Chris Gray G; 73 Wayne Hunter LT; **76** Steve Hutchinson G; **71** Walter Jones LT; 75 Sean Locklear RT; **61** Robbie Tobeck C; 77 Floyd Womack G; 70 Jerry Wunsch RT; **Defensive linemen (DL)**: 99 Rocky Bernard DT; 78 Antonio Cochran DE; 97 Brandon Mitchell DE; **95** Rashad Moore DT; **56** Chike Okeafor DE; 93 Craig Terrill DT; 90 Marcus Tubbs DT; **96** Grant Wistrom DE; **98** Cedric Woodard DT	**Linebackers (LB)**: 50 Solomon Bates OLB; **94** Chad Brown OLB; **57** Orlando Huff MLB; **58** Isaiah Kacyvenski OLB; 53 Niko Koutouvides MLB; 59 Tracy White OLB; **Defensive backs (DB)**: 27 Jordan Babineaux CB; 34 Terreal Bierria SS; **28** Michael Boulware SS; **26** Ken Hamlin FS; **21** Ken Lucas CB; 33 Marquand Manuel FS; 42 Kris Richard CB; 24 Bobby Taylor CB; **23** Marcus Trufant CB; **Special teams (ST)**: 3 Josh Brown K; 52 J.P. Darche LS; 13 Ken Walter P	**Practice squad**: 47 Tony Donald LB; 30 LaTarence Dunbar WR; 68 Kevin Emanuel DE; 40 Michael Harden CB; 60 Joey Hollenbeck C; 9 Donnie Jones P; 67 Otis Leverette DE; 45 R. J. Luke TE; 66 Christian Mohr DE (IPP); **Reserve**: 85 Alex Bannister WR (IR); 35 Chris Davis FB (IR); 18 D. J. Hackett WR (IR); 7 Brock Huard QB (IR); 54 D. D. Lewis OLB (IR); 31 Arnold Parker S (IR); 49 Curtis Randall OLB (IR); 22 Damien Robinson S (IR); 16 Tom Rouen P (IR); 51 Anthony Simmons OLB (IR); **72** Chris Terry LT (IR); Rookies in italics 53 active, 11 reserve, 9 practice squad

- Starters in bold.
- (*) Denotes players that were selected for the 2005 Pro Bowl.

== Schedule ==
=== Preseason ===
Week	Date	Opponent	Result	Record	Game site	Recap
1	August 16	at Green Bay Packers	W 21–3	1–0	Lambeau Field	Recap
2	August 21	Denver Broncos	L 3–19	1–1	Qwest Field	Recap
3	August 27	at San Diego Chargers	W 26–20	2–1	Qualcomm Stadium	Recap
4	September 2	Minnesota Vikings	W 23–21	3–1	Qwest Field	Recap

Source: Seahawks Media Guides

=== Regular season ===
Divisional matchups have the NFC West playing the NFC South and the AFC East.

Week	Date	Opponent	Result	Record	Game site	Recap
1	September 12	at New Orleans Saints	W 21–7	1–0	Louisiana Superdome	Recap
2	September 19	at Tampa Bay Buccaneers	W 10–6	2–0	Raymond James Stadium	Recap
3	September 26	San Francisco 49ers	W 34–0	3–0	Qwest Field	Recap
4	Bye					
5	October 10	St. Louis Rams	L 27–33 (OT)	3–1	Qwest Field	Recap
6	October 17	at New England Patriots	L 20–30	3–2	Gillette Stadium	Recap
7	October 24	at Arizona Cardinals	L 17–25	3–3	Sun Devil Stadium	Recap
8	October 31	Carolina Panthers	W 23–17	4–3	Qwest Field	Recap
9	November 7	at San Francisco 49ers	W 42–27	5–3	3Com Park	Recap
10	November 14	at St. Louis Rams	L 12–23	5–4	Edward Jones Dome	Recap
11	November 21	Miami Dolphins	W 24–17	6–4	Qwest Field	Recap
12	November 28	Buffalo Bills	L 9–38	6–5	Qwest Field	Recap
13	December 6	Dallas Cowboys	L 39–43	6–6	Qwest Field	Recap
14	December 12	at Minnesota Vikings	W 27–23	7–6	Hubert H. Humphrey Metrodome	Recap
15	December 19	at New York Jets	L 14–37	7–7	Giants Stadium	Recap
16	December 26	Arizona Cardinals	W 24–21	8–7	Qwest Field	Recap
17	January 2	Atlanta Falcons	W 28–26	9–7	Qwest Field	Recap

Source: 2004 NFL season results

=== Postseason ===
Round	Date	Opponent (seed)	Result	Record	Game site	Recap
Wild Card	January 8, 2005	St. Louis Rams (5)	L 20–27	0–1	Qwest Field	Recap

== Standings ==
NFC West
	W	L	T	PCT	DIV	CONF	PF	PA	STK
^{(4)} Seattle Seahawks	9	7	0	.563	3–3	8–4	371	373	W2
^{(5)} St. Louis Rams	8	8	0	.500	5–1	7–5	319	392	W2
Arizona Cardinals	6	10	0	.375	2–4	5–7	284	322	W1
San Francisco 49ers	2	14	0	.125	2–4	2–10	259	452	L3

NFC
#	Team	Division	W	L	T	PCT	DIV	CONF	SOS	SOV	STK
Division leaders
1	Philadelphia Eagles	East	13	3	0	.813	6–0	11–1	.453	.409	L2
2	Atlanta Falcons	South	11	5	0	.688	4–2	8–4	.420	.432	L2
3	Green Bay Packers	North	10	6	0	.625	5–1	9–3	.457	.419	W2
4	Seattle Seahawks	West	9	7	0	.563	3–3	8–4	.445	.368	W2
Wild cards
5 (Note: St. Louis clinched the NFC #5 seed instead of Minnesota or New Orleans based on better conference record (7–5 to Minnesota’s 5–7 to New Orleans’ 6–6).)	St. Louis Rams	West	8	8	0	.500	5–1	7–5	.488	.438	W2
6 (Note: Minnesota clinched the NFC #6 seed instead of New Orleans based on head-to-head victory.)	Minnesota Vikings	North	8	8	0	.500	3–3	5–7	.480	.406	L2
Did not qualify for the postseason
7	New Orleans Saints	South	8	8	0	.500	3–3	6–6	.465	.427	W4
8	Carolina Panthers	South	7	9	0	.438	3–3	6–6	.496	.366	L1
9 (Note: Detroit finished ahead of Arizona and New York Giants based upon head-to-head record (2–0 versus Arizona’s 1–1 and New York Giants’ 0–2). Division tiebreak was initially used to eliminate Dallas and Washington.)	Detroit Lions	North	6	10	0	.375	2–4	5–7	.496	.417	L2
10	Arizona Cardinals	West	6	10	0	.375	2–4	5–7	.461	.417	W1
11 (Note: New York Giants finished ahead of Dallas and Washington in the NFC East based on better head-to-head record (3–1 to Dallas‘ 2–2 to Washington’s 1–3).)	New York Giants	East	6	10	0	.375	3–3	5–7	.516	.417	W1
12 (Note: Dallas finished ahead of Washington in the NFC East based on head-to-head sweep.)	Dallas Cowboys	East	6	10	0	.375	2–4	5–7	.516	.375	L1
13	Washington Redskins	East	6	10	0	.375	1–5	6–6	.477	.333	W1
14 (Note: Tampa Bay finished ahead of Chicago based upon head-to-head victory.)	Tampa Bay Buccaneers	South	5	11	0	.313	2–4	4–8	.477	.413	L4
15	Chicago Bears	North	5	11	0	.313	2–4	4–8	.465	.388	L4
16	San Francisco 49ers	West	2	14	0	.125	2–4	2–10	.488	.375	L3
Tiebreakers (Note: When breaking ties for three or more teams under the NFL's rules, they are first broken within divisions, then comparing only the highest-ranked remaining team from each division.)

== Game summaries ==
=== Preseason ===
==== Week P1: at Green Bay Packers ====
Preseason Week One: Seattle Seahawks at Green Bay Packers – Game summary

Quarter	1	2	3	4	Total
Seahawks	7	7	0	7	21
Packers	3	0	0	0	3

at Lambeau Field, Green Bay, Wisconsin

- Date: August 16
- Game time: 7:05pm local
- Game weather: overcast, 68 °F (20 °C), 60% humidity, wind S 8 miles per hour (13 km/h)
- Game attendance: 69,718
- Referee: Bill Leavy
- TV: ABC
- Gamecenter, Gamebook

==== Week P2: vs. Denver Broncos ====
Preseason Week Two: Seattle Seahawks vs. Denver Broncos – Game summary

Quarter	1	2	3	4	Total
Broncos	0	6	3	10	19
Seahawks	0	3	0	0	3

at Qwest Field, Seattle

- Date: August 21
- Game time: 7:05pm local
- Game weather: cloudy, 66 °F (19 °C), 88% humidity, wind S 10 miles per hour (16 km/h)
- Game attendance: 48,090
- Referee: Pete Morelli
- TV: KONG
- Gamecenter, Gamebook

==== Week P3: at San Diego Chargers ====
Preseason Week Three: Seattle Seahawks at San Diego Chargers – Game summary

Quarter	1	2	3	4	Total
Seahawks	10	13	3	0	26
Chargers	0	0	7	13	20

at Qualcomm Stadium, San Diego, California

- Date: August 16
- Game time: 7:05pm local
- Game weather: clear, 73 °F (23 °C), 61% humidity, wind WSW 8 miles per hour (13 km/h)
- Game attendance: 35,536
- Referee: Ed Hochuli
- TV: KONG
- Gamecenter, Gamebook

==== Week P4: vs. Minnesota Vikings ====
Preseason Week Four: Seattle Seahawks vs. Minnesota Vikings – Game summary

Quarter	1	2	3	4	Total
Vikings	7	0	14	0	21
Seahawks	0	14	3	6	23

at Qwest Field, Seattle

- Date: September 2
- Game time: 6:07pm local
- Game weather: partly cloudy, 66 °F (19 °C), 52% humidity, wind variable 5 miles per hour (8.0 km/h)
- Game attendance: 50,198
- Referee: Mike Carey
- TV: KONG
- Gamecenter, Gamebook

=== Regular season ===
==== Week 1: at New Orleans Saints ====
Week One: Seattle Seahawks at New Orleans – Game summary

Quarter	1	2	3	4	Total
Seahawks	0	14	7	0	21
Saints	0	7	0	0	7

at Louisiana Superdome, New Orleans

- Date: September 12
- Game time: 12:06pm local
- Game weather: indoors
- Game attendance: 64,900
- Referee: Ed Hochuli
- TV announcers (Fox): Ron Pitts, Tim Ryan and Eric Clemons
- Gamecenter, Gamebook

Game information

First quarter

- No scoring plays

Second quarter

- SEA – Shaun Alexander 14-yard pass from Matt Hasselbeck (Josh Brown kick), 14:52 (SEA 7–0)
- SEA – Shaun Alexander 6-yard run (Josh Brown kick), 6:38 (SEA 14–0)
- NO – Ernie Conwell 6-yard pass from Aaron Brooks (John Carney kick), 2:54 (SEA 14–7)

Third quarter

- SEA – Shaun Alexander 9-yard run (Josh Brown kick), 3:06 (SEA 21–7)

Fourth quarter

- No scoring plays

Top passers

- SEA – Matt Hasselbeck: 19/29, 246 yds, 1 TD, 1 INT
- NO – Aaron Brooks: 18/37, 223 yds, 1 TD, 1 INT

Top rushers

- SEA – Shaun Alexander: 28 car, 135 yds, 2 TD
- NO – Deuce McAllister: 16 car, 57 yds

Top receivers

- SEA – Darrell Jackson: 7 rec, 98 yds
- NO – Joe Horn: 6 rec, 110 yds

Team – pass – rush – total – to

- SEA – 246 – 169 – 415 – 2
- NO – 207 – 74 – 281 – 3

The Seahawks won for only the seventh time in their last eighteen road games, holding Aaron Brooks to one touchdown while forcing two New Orleans fumbles.

==== Week 2: at Tampa Bay Buccaneers ====
Week Two: Seattle Seahawks at Tampa Bay Buccaneers – Game summary

Quarter	1	2	3	4	Total
Seahawks	3	7	0	0	10
Buccaneers	0	3	0	3	6

at Raymond James Stadium, Tampa, Florida

- Date: September 19
- Game time: 4:05pm local
- Game weather: partly cloudy, 88 °F (31 °C), 46% humidity, wind NE 8 miles per hour (13 km/h)
- Game attendance: 65,089
- Referee: Johnny Grier
- TV announcers (Fox): Curt Menefee, Tim Green and Chip Carter
- Gamecenter, Gamebook

Game information

First quarter

- SEA – Josh Brown 44-yard field goal, 2:24 (SEA 3–0)

Second quarter

- SEA – Koren Robinson 27-yard pass from Matt Hasselbeck (Josh Brown kick), 14:25 (SEA 10–0)
- TB – Martin Gramatica 24-yard field goal, 0:49 (SEA 10–3)

Third quarter

- No scoring plays

Fourth quarter

- TB – Martin Gramatica 27-yard field goal, 4:35 (SEA 10–6)

–)

Top passers

- SEA – Matt Hasselbeck: 12/26, 147 yds, 1 TD, 1 INT
- TB – Chris Simms: 21/32, 175 yds, 1 INT

Top rushers

- SEA – Shaun Alexander: 17 car, 45 yds
- TB – Charlie Garner: 13 car, 75 yds

Top receivers

- SEA – Koren Robinson: 4 rec, 66 yds, 1 TD
- TB – Michael Clayton: 6 rec, 61 yds

Team – pass – rush – total – to

- SEA – 124 – 58 – 182 – 1
- TB – 179 – 92 – 271 – 3

The Seahawks defeated the Buccaneers 10–6 despite recording only nine first downs and being shut out in the second half. The Seahawks intercepted Brad Johnson and Chris Simms and limited the Buccaneers to just 271 total yards.

==== Week 3: vs. San Francisco 49ers ====
Week Three: Seattle Seahawks vs. San Francisco 49ers – Game summary

Quarter	1	2	3	4	Total
49ers	0	0	0	0	0
Seahawks	17	7	10	0	34

at Qwest Field, Seattle

- Date: September 26
- Game time: 1:16pm local
- Game weather: overcast, 57 °F (14 °C), 87% humidity, wind variable 3 miles per hour (4.8 km/h)
- Game attendance: 66,709
- Referee: Bill Carollo
- TV announcers (Fox): Ron Pitts, Tim Ryan and Amy Van Dyken
- Gamecenter, Gamebook

Game information

First quarter

- SEA – Josh Brown 35-yard field goal, 8:24 (SEA 3–0)
- SEA – Shaun Alexander 1-yard run (Josh Brown kick), 4:37 (SEA 10–0)

Second quarter

- SEA – Shaun Alexander 3-yard pass from Matt Hasselbeck (Josh Brown kick), 2:28 (SEA 17–0)
- SEA – Shaun Alexander 1-yard run (Josh Brown kick), 1:02 (SEA 24–0)

Third quarter

- SEA – Itula Mili 1-yard pass from Matt Hasselbeck (Josh Brown kick), 10:41 (SEA 31–0)
- SEA – Josh Brown 28-yard field goal, 2:09 (SEA 34–0)

Fourth quarter

- No scoring plays

Top passers

- SF – Ken Dorsey: 19/32, 153 yds, 2 INT
- SEA – Matt Hasselbeck: 21/30, 254 yds, 2 TD

Top rushers

- SF – Jamal Robertson: 5 car, 24 yds
- SEA – Shaun Alexander: 19 car, 52 yds, 2 TD

Top receivers

- SF – Cedrick Wilson: 6 rec, 57 yds
- SEA – Darrell Jackson: 7 rec, 97 yds

Team – pass – rush – total – to

- SF – 127 – 48 – 175 – 4
- SEA – 257 – 117 – 374 – 0

The Seahawks home opener was a 34–0 shutout of the 49ers where they intercepted Ken Dorsey twice and limited the Niners to just 175 yards. It was San Francisco's first shutout loss since losing to the Atlanta Falcons 0–7 in 1977.

==== Week 5: vs. St. Louis Rams ====
Week Five: Seattle Seahawks vs. St. Louis Rams – Game summary

Quarter	1	2	3	4	OT	Total
Rams	0	7	3	17	6	33
Seahawks	7	17	0	3	0	27

at Qwest Field, Seattle

- Date: October 10
- Game time: 1:15pm local
- Game weather: clear, 57 °F (14 °C), 82% humidity, wind SE 8 miles per hour (13 km/h)
- Game attendance: 58,513
- Referee: Pete Morelli
- TV announcers (Fox): Kenny Albert, Brian Baldinger and Amy Van Dyken
- Gamecenter, Gamebook

Game information

First quarter

- SEA – Shaun Alexander 1-yard run (Josh Brown kick), 9:52 (SEA 7–0)

Second quarter

- SEA – Josh Brown 48-yard field goal, 14:17 (SEA 10–0)
- STL – Marc Bulger 9-yard run (Jeff Wilkins kick), 11:29 (SEA 10–7)
- SEA – Jerramy Stevens 4-yard pass from Matt Hasselbeck (Josh Brown kick), 8:54 (SEA 17–7)
- SEA – Darrell Jackson 56-yard pass from Matt Hasselbeck (Josh Brown kick), 0:50 (SEA 24–7)

Third quarter

- STL – Jeff Wilkins 39-yard field goal, 0:56 (SEA 24–10)

Fourth quarter

- SEA – Josh Brown 34-yard field goal, 8:42 (SEA 27–10)
- STL – Brandon Manumaleuna 8-yard pass from Marc Bulger (Jeff Wilkins kick), 5:34 (SEA 27–17)
- STL – Kevin Curtis 41-yard pass from Marc Bulger (Jeff Wilkins kick), 3:30 (SEA 27–24)
- STL – Jeff Wilkins 36-yard field goal, 0:08 (Tied 27–27)

Overtime

- STL – Shaun McDonald 52-yard pass from Marc Bulger, 11:58 (STL 33–27)

Top passers

- STL – Marc Bulger: 24/42, 325 yds, 3 TD, 3 INT
- SEA – Matt Hasselbeck: 20/35, 216 yds, 2 TD

Top rushers

- STL – Steven Jackson: 5 car, 64 yds
- SEA – Shaun Alexander: 23 car, 150 yds, 1 TD

Top receivers

- STL – Isaac Bruce: 6 rec, 78 yds
- SEA – Darrell Jackson: 5 rec, 91 yds, 1 TD

Team – pass – rush – total – to

- STL – 317 – 124 – 441 – 3
- SEA – 204 – 187 – 391 – 0

The Seahawks suffered their first home loss since 2002. The Rams were bullied in the first half and fell behind 24–7, but in the second half Marc Bulger threw two touchdowns as the Rams outscored Seattle 20–3; tied 27–27 the game went to overtime and Bulger threw three passes – the last a 52-yard score to Shaun McDonald and the 33–27 Rams win.

==== Week 6: at New England Patriots ====
Week Six: Seattle Seahawks at New England Patriots – Game summary

Quarter	1	2	3	4	Total
Seahawks	0	6	3	11	20
Patriots	10	10	0	10	30

at Gillette Stadium, Foxborough, Massachusetts

- Date: October 17
- Game time: 1:02pm local
- Game weather: partly cloudy, 50 °F (10 °C), 65% humidity, wind SSW 12 miles per hour (19 km/h)
- Game attendance: 68,756
- Referee: Terry McAulay
- TV announcers (Fox): Dick Stockton, Troy Aikman, Cris Collinsworth and Pam Oliver
- Gamecenter, Gamebook

Game information

First quarter

- NE – Corey Dillon 1-yard run (Adam Vinatieri kick), 7:44 (NE 7–0)
- NE – Adam Vinatieri 40-yard field goal, 2:14 (NE 10–0)

Second quarter

- NE – David Patten 6-yard pass from Tom Brady (Adam Vinatieri kick), 12:32 (NE 17–0)
- SEA – Josh Brown 33-yard field goal, 9:35 (NE 17–3)
- NE – Adam Vinatieri 39-yard field goal, 3:07 (NE 20–3)
- SEA – Josh Brown 40-yard field goal, 0:34 (NE 20–6)

Third quarter

- SEA – Josh Brown 28-yard field goal, 9:01 (NE 20–9)

Fourth quarter

- SEA – Shaun Alexander 9-yard run (2-pt PAT: Jerramy Stevens pass from Matt Hasselbeck), 11:05 (NE 20–17)
- NE – Adam Vinatieri 30-yard field goal, 6:43 (NE 23–17)
- SEA – Josh Brown 31-yard field goal, 3:01 (NE 23–20)
- NE – Corey Dillon 9-yard run (Adam Vinatieri kick), 1:55 (NE 30–20)

Top passers

- SEA – Matt Hasselbeck: 27/50, 349 yds, 2 INT
- NE – Tom Brady: 19/30, 231 yds, 1 TD, 1 INT

Top rushers

- SEA – Shaun Alexander: 16 car, 77 yds, 1 TD
- NE – Corey Dillon: 23 car, 105 yds, 2 TD

Top receivers

- SEA – Koren Robinson: 9 rec, 150 yds
- NE – David Patten: 5 rec, 58 yds, 1 TD

Team – pass – rush – total – to

- SEA – 341 – 102 – 443 – 2
- NE – 224 – 138 – 362 – 2

A week after losing to one participant in Super Bowl XXXVI the Seahawks fell to that game's winner as the Patriots reached a league-record 20th consecutive win (regular and postseason) 30–20. Matt Hasselbeck, a former Patriots ball boy whose dad Don Hasselbeck played in Foxboro alongside Steve Grogan, threw for 349 yards but was intercepted twice. This game marked the end of an 11-year hiatus between the Patriots and Seahawks dating back to 1993. The Seahawks would not return to New England until 2016.

==== Week 7: at Arizona Cardinals ====
Week Seven: Seattle Seahawks at Arizona Cardinals – Game summary

Quarter	1	2	3	4	Total
Seahawks	0	3	7	7	17
Cardinals	7	6	3	9	25

at Sun Devil Stadium, Tempe, Arizona

- Date: October 24
- Game time: 1:16pm local
- Game weather: clear, 77 °F (25 °C), 30% humidity, wind calm
- Game attendance: 35,695
- Referee: Bill Vinovich
- TV announcers (Fox): Spero Dedes, Erik Kramer and Kevin McCabe
- Gamecenter, Gamebook

Game information

First quarter

- ARI – Larry Fitzgerald 25-yard pass from Josh McCown (Neil Rackers kick), 8:23 (ARI 7–0)

Second quarter

- SEA – Josh Brown 54-yard field goal, 6:28 (ARI 7–3)
- ARI – Neil Rackers 55-yard field goal, 3:01 (ARI 10–3)
- ARI – Neil Rackers 55-yard field goal, 1:01 (ARI 13–3)

Third quarter

- ARI – Neil Rackers 50-yard field goal, 2:50 (ARI 16–3)
- SEA – Darrell Jackson 1-yard pass from Matt Hasselbeck (Josh Brown kick), 0:05 (ARI 16–10)

Fourth quarter

- SEA – Ken Lucas 21-yard interception return (Josh Brown kick), 13:07 (SEA 17–16)
- ARI – Safety, Donnie Jones blocked punt out of end zone, 8:50 (ARI 18–17)
- ARI – Emmitt Smith 23-yard run (Neil Rackers kick), 1:53 (ARI 25–17)

Top passers

- SEA – Matt Hasselbeck: 14/41, 187 yds, 1 TD, 4 INT
- ARI – Josh McCown: 22/36, 212 yds, 1 TD, 1 INT

Top rushers

- SEA – Shaun Alexander: 12 car, 65 yds
- ARI – Emmitt Smith: 26 car, 106 yds, 1 TD

Top receivers

- SEA – Darrell Jackson: 8 rec, 109 yds, 1 TD
- ARI – Larry Fitzgerald: 4 rec, 73 yds, 1 TD

Team – pass – rush – total – to

- SEA – 180 – 77 – 257 – 4
- ARI – 189 – 127 – 316 – 2

Playing in Sun Devil Stadium the Seahawks' previous road woes resumed with four interceptions thrown by Matt Hasselbeck and the Seahawks limited to just 257 total yards in a 25–17 loss. Seattle erased a 16–3 gap (the go-ahead score came when Ken Lucas picked off Josh McCown and ran back a 21-yard score) but gave up a safety, then gave up a 23-yard touchdown by Emmitt Smith in the fourth quarter.

==== Week 8: vs. Carolina Panthers ====
Week Eight: Seattle Seahawks vs. Carolina Panthers – Game summary

Quarter	1	2	3	4	Total
Panthers	0	7	3	7	17
Seahawks	7	7	3	6	23

at Qwest Field, Seattle

- Date: October 31
- Game time: 1:06pm local
- Game weather: clear, 49 °F (9 °C), 64% humidity, wind SE 6 miles per hour (9.7 km/h)
- Game attendance: 66,214
- Referee: Ed Hochuli
- TV announcers (Fox): Curt Menefee, Tim Green and Amy Van Dyken
- Gamecenter, Gamebook

Game information

First quarter

- SEA – Shaun Alexander 35-yard pass from Matt Hasselbeck (Josh Brown kick), 9:12 (SEA 7–0)

Second quarter

- SEA – Shaun Alexander 5-yard run (Josh Brown kick), 9:07 (SEA 14–0)
- CAR – Muhsin Muhammad 20-yard pass from Jake Delhomme (John Kasay kick), 5:14 (SEA 14–7)

Third quarter

- CAR – John Kasay 22-yard field goal, 12:04 (SEA 14–10)
- SEA – Josh Brown 19-yard field goal, 6:44 (SEA 17–10)

Fourth quarter

- SEA – Josh Brown 19-yard field goal, 13:27 (SEA 20–10)
- SEA – Josh Brown 19-yard field goal, 5:42 (SEA 23–10)
- CAR – Muhsin Muhammad 20-yard pass from Jake Delhomme (John Kasay kick), 1:39 (SEA 23–17)

Top passers

- CAR – Jake Delhomme: 19/36, 248 yds, 2 TD, 1 INT
- SEA – Matt Hasselbeck: 21/30, 201 yds, 1 TD, 1 INT

Top rushers

- CAR – Joey Harris: 9 car, 45 yds
- SEA – Shaun Alexander: 32 car, 195 yds, 1 TD

Top receivers

- CAR – Muhsin Muhammad: 8 rec, 106 yds, 2 TD
- SEA – Darrell Jackson: 6 rec, 71 yds

Team – pass – rush – total – to

- CAR – 248 – 94 – 342 – 1
- SEA – 196 – 237 – 433 – 2

Against the defending NFC champion Panthers the Seahawks erupted to 237 rushing yards and a 23–17 win. Shaun Alexander accounted for 195 rushing yards and a touchdown.

==== Week 9: at San Francisco 49ers ====
Week Nine: Seattle Seahawks at San Francisco 49ers – Game summary

Quarter	1	2	3	4	Total
Seahawks	7	14	14	7	42
49ers	14	3	7	3	27

at Monster Park, San Francisco

- Date: November 7
- Game time: 1:05pm local
- Game weather: clear, 57 °F (14 °C), 77% humidity, wind NE 8 miles per hour (13 km/h)
- Game attendance: 64,423
- Referee: Tony Corrente
- TV announcers (Fox): Curt Menefee, Tim Green and Tony Ventrella
- Gamecenter, Gamebook

Game information

First quarter

- SF – Kevan Barlow 3-yard run (Todd Peterson kick), 12:08 (SF 7–0)
- SEA – Darrell Jackson 33-yard pass from Matt Hasselbeck (Josh Brown kick), 5:15 (Tied 7–7)
- SF – Curtis Conway 28-yard pass from Tim Rattay (Todd Peterson kick), 1:22 (SF 14–7)

Second quarter

- SEA – Shaun Alexander 1-yard run (Josh Brown kick), 6:37 (Tied 14–14)
- SEA – Shaun Alexander 4-yard run (Josh Brown kick), 1:57 (SEA 21–14)
- SF – Todd Peterson 27-yard field goal, 0:03 (SEA 21–17)

Third quarter

- SF – Brandon Lloyd 39-yard pass from Tim Rattay (Todd Peterson kick), 12:41 (SF 24–21)
- SEA – Koren Robinson 25-yard pass from Matt Hasselbeck (Josh Brown kick), 11:16 (SEA 28–24)
- SEA – Darrell Jackson 39-yard pass from Matt Hasselbeck (Josh Brown kick), 1:32 (SEA 35–24)

Fourth quarter

- SF – Todd Peterson 30-yard field goal, 11:09 (SEA 35–27)
- SEA – Anthony Simmons 23-yard interception return (Josh Brown kick), 8:27 (SEA 42–27)

Top passers

- SEA – Matt Hasselbeck: 17/28, 285 yds, 3 TD
- SF – Tim Rattay: 23/35, 259 yds, 2 TD, 1 INT

Top rushers

- SEA – Shaun Alexander: 26 car, 160 yds, 2 TD
- SF – Kevan Barlow: 18 car, 61 yds, 1 TD

Top receivers

- SEA – Darrell Jackson: 5 rec, 114 yds, 2 TD
- SF – Brandon Lloyd: 4 rec, 75 yds, 1 TD

Team – pass – rush – total – to

- SEA – 269 – 184 – 453 – 0
- SF – 243 – 74 – 317 – 1

Despite seven penalties for 55 yards the Seahawks shot down the 49ers at Candlestick Park 42–27, rushing for 184 yards and two touchdowns alongside 285 yards and three scores from Matt Hasselbeck. The Seahawks ended the game when they intercepted Tim Rattay and ran back a 23-yard score in the fourth.

==== Week 10: at St. Louis Rams ====
Week Ten: Seattle Seahawks at St. Louis Rams – Game summary

Quarter	1	2	3	4	Total
Seahawks	0	6	6	0	12
Rams	14	3	3	3	23

at Edward Jones Dome, St. Louis, Missouri

- Date: November 14
- Game time: 12:02pm local
- Game weather: indoors
- Game attendance: 66,044
- Referee: Bill Leavy
- TV announcers (Fox): Dick Stockton, Daryl Johnston and Tony Siragusa
- Gamecenter, Gamebook

Game information

First quarter

- STL – Kevin Curtis 15-yard pass from Marc Bulger (Jeff Wilkins kick), 12:23 (STL 7–0)
- STL – Steven Jackson 4-yard run (Jeff Wilkins kick), 6:51 (STL 14–0)

Second quarter

- STL – Jeff Wilkins 36-yard field goal, 12:18 (STL 17–0)
- SEA – Josh Brown 28-yard field goal, 6:50 (STL 17–3)
- SEA – Josh Brown 30-yard field goal, 5:03 (STL 17–6)

Third quarter

- STL – Jeff Wilkins 47-yard field goal, 9:32 (STL 20–6)
- SEA – Josh Brown 45-yard field goal, 5:54 (STL 20–9)
- SEA – Josh Brown 41-yard field goal, 3:54 (STL 20–12)

Fourth quarter

- STL – Jeff Wilkins 23-yard field goal, 0:26 (STL 23–12)

Top passers

- SEA – Matt Hasselbeck: 15/36, 172 yds, 1 INT
- STL – Marc Bulger: 23/34, 262 yds, 1 TD

Top rushers

- SEA – Shaun Alexander: 22 car, 176 yds
- STL – Marshall Faulk: 18 car, 139 yds

Top receivers

- SEA – Koren Robinson: 2 rec, 50 yds
- STL – Isaac Bruce: 7 rec, 104 yds

Team – pass – rush – total – to

- SEA – 172 – 200 – 372 – 2
- STL – 260 – 202 – 462 – 2

At St. Louis the Rams won a battle of field goals 23–12, limiting Hasselbeck to just 172 yards. Hasselbeck was knocked out of the game.

==== Week 11: vs. Miami Dolphins ====
Week Eleven: Seattle Seahawks vs. Miami Dolphins – Game summary

Quarter	1	2	3	4	Total
Dolphins	7	0	7	3	17
Seahawks	10	7	0	7	24

at Qwest Field, Seattle

- Date: November 21
- Game time: 1:06pm local
- Game weather: partly cloudy, 46 °F (8 °C), 73% humidity, wind SE 3 miles per hour (4.8 km/h)
- Game attendance: 66,644
- Referee: Mike Carey
- TV announcers (CBS): Kevin Harlan and Randy Cross
- Gamecenter, Gamebook

Game information

First quarter

- SEA – Jerry Rice 21-yard pass from Trent Dilfer (Josh Brown kick), 9:19 (SEA 7–0)
- MIA – A. J. Feeley 7-yard run (Olindo Mare kick), 4:25 (Tied 7–7)
- SEA – Josh Brown 33-yard field goal, 1:13 (SEA 10–7)

Second quarter

- SEA – Shaun Alexander 4-yard run (Josh Brown kick), 4:38 (SEA 17–7)

Third quarter

- MIA – Chris Chambers 16-yard pass from A. J. Feeley (Olindo Mare kick), 10:33 (SEA 17–14)

Fourth quarter

- MIA – Olindo Mare 39-yard field goal, 2:20 (Tied 17–17)
- SEA – Michael Boulware 63-yard interception return (Josh Brown kick), 0:56 (SEA 24–17)

Top passers

- MIA – A. J. Feeley: 23/45, 229 yds, 1 TD, 2 INT
- SEA – Trent Dilfer: 14/28, 196 yds, 1 TD, 2 INT

Top rushers

- MIA – Travis Minor: 13 car, 37 yds
- SEA – Shaun Alexander: 29 car, 96 yds, 1 TD

Top receivers

- MIA – Chris Chambers: 9 rec, 103 yds, 1 TD
- SEA – Jerry Rice: 3 rec, 86 yds, 1 TD

Team – pass – rush – total – to

- MIA – 177 – 116 – 293 – 3
- SEA – 219 – 69 – 288 – 4

The Dolphins rallied from down 17–7 to tie the game, but in the fourth Michael Boulware picked off A. J. Feeley and ran back a 63-yard touchdown. Trent Dilfer started instead of Matt Hasselbeck and managed a touchdown to Jerry Rice in the 24–17 Seahawks win; the score was Rice's first of the season after being traded to Seattle from the Raiders.

==== Week 12: vs. Buffalo Bills ====
Week Twelve: Seattle Seahawks vs. Buffalo Bills – Game summary

Quarter	1	2	3	4	Total
Bills	7	10	7	14	38
Seahawks	0	3	0	6	9

at Qwest Field, Seattle

- Date: November 28
- Game time: 1:16pm local
- Game weather: clear, 41 °F (5 °C), 82% humidity, wind SE 3 miles per hour (4.8 km/h)
- Game attendance: 66,271
- Referee: Pete Morelli
- TV announcers (CBS): Don Criqui and Steve Tasker
- Gamecenter, Gamebook

Game information

First quarter

- BUF – Willis McGahee 2-yard run (Rian Lindell kick), 10:38 (BUF 7–0)

Second quarter

- BUF – Rian Lindell 53-yard field goal, 13:30 (BUF 10–7)
- SEA – Josh Brown 19-yard field goal, 7:51 (BUF 10–3)
- BUF – Lee Evans 3-yard pass from Drew Bledsoe (Rian Lindell kick), 0:06 (BUF 17–3)

Third quarter

- BUF – Willis McGahee 2-yard run (Rian Lindell kick), 6:44 (BUF 24–3)

Fourth quarter

- BUF – Willis McGahee 30-yard run (Rian Lindell kick), 10:38 (BUF 31–3)
- BUF – Willis McGahee 1-yard run (Rian Lindell kick), 7:14 (BUF 38–3)
- SEA – Bobby Engram 8-yard pass from Matt Hasselbeck (PAT failed), 3:41 (BUF 38–9)

Top passers

- BUF – Drew Bledsoe: 25/37, 275 yds, 1 TD, 3 INT
- SEA – Matt Hasselbeck: 19/38, 185 yds, 1 TD, 1 INT

Top rushers

- BUF – Willis McGahee: 28 car, 116 yds, 4 TD
- SEA – Shaun Alexander: 13 car, 39 yds

Top receivers

- BUF – Eric Moulds: 8 rec, 93 yds
- SEA – Darrell Jackson: 4 rec, 45 yds

Team – pass – rush – total – to

- BUF – 286 – 148 – 434 – 3
- SEA – 175 – 55 – 230 – 2

The 6–4 Seahawks hosted the 4–6 Bills and Willis McGahee exploded to four touchdowns in a 38–9 Buffalo rout. Drew Bledsoe was intercepted three times but managed a touchdown to Lee Evans.

==== Week 13: vs. Dallas Cowboys ====
Week Thirteen: Seattle Seahawks vs. Dallas Cowboys – Game summary

Quarter	1	2	3	4	Total
Cowboys	3	16	10	14	43
Seahawks	14	0	3	22	39

at Qwest Field, Seattle

- Date: December 6
- Game time: 6:09pm local
- Game weather: overcast, 45 °F (7 °C), 76% humidity, wind calm
- Game attendance: 68,093
- Referee: Terry McAulay
- TV announcers (ABC): Al Michaels, John Madden and Michele Tafoya
- Gamecenter, Gamebook

Game information

First quarter

- SEA – Jerry Rice 27-yard pass from Matt Hasselbeck (Josh Brown kick), 10:42 (SEA 7–0)
- DAL – Billy Cundiff 39-yard field goal, 8:49 (SEA 7–3)
- SEA – Darrell Jackson 2-yard pass from Matt Hasselbeck (Josh Brown kick), 3:47 (SEA 14–3)

Second quarter

- DAL – Billy Cundiff 49-yard field goal, 12:12 (SEA 14–6)
- DAL – Terrance Copper 9-yard pass from Vinny Testaverde (PAT failed), 6:08 (SEA 14–12)
- DAL – Julius Jones 8-yard run (Billy Cundiff kick), 0:32 (DAL 19–14)

Third quarter

- DAL – Julius Jones 10-yard run (Billy Cundiff kick), 13:45 (DAL 26–14)
- DAL – Billy Cundiff 47-yard field goal, 10:10 (DAL 29–14)
- SEA – Josh Brown 21-yard field goal, 3:01 (DAL 29–17)

Fourth quarter

- SEA – Shaun Alexander 1-yard run (Josh Brown kick), 9:30 (DAL 29–24)
- SEA – Jerheme Urban 19-yard pass from Matt Hasselbeck (2-pt PAT: Darrell Jackson pass from Matt Hasselbeck), 5:29 (SEA 32–29)
- SEA – Shaun Alexander 32-yard run (Josh Brown kick), 2:46 (SEA 39–29)
- DAL – Keyshawn Johnson 34-yard pass from Vinny Testaverde (Billy Cundiff kick), 1:45 (SEA 39–36)
- DAL – Julius Jones 17-yard run (Billy Cundiff kick), 0:32 (DAL 43–39)

Top passers

- DAL – Vinny Testaverde: 18/34, 225 yds, 2 TD, 2 INT
- SEA – Matt Hasselbeck: 28/40, 414 yds, 3 TD

Top rushers

- DAL – Julius Jones: 30 car, 198 yds, 3 TD
- SEA – Shaun Alexander: 21 car, 83 yds, 2 TD

Top receivers

- DAL – Keyshawn Johnson: 6 rec, 116 yds, 1 TD
- SEA – Jerry Rice: 8 rec, 145 yds, 1 TD

Team – pass – rush – total – to

- DAL – 207 – 198 – 405 – 2
- SEA – 398 – 109 – 507 – 2

Hosting Monday Night Football the Seahawks' roller-coaster of a season continued as they fell to 6–6 to the now-5-7 Cowboys. The Hawks led 14–3 after one quarter, but in the second and third the Cowboys scored 26 points (botching a two-point attempt after Vinny Testaverde's touchdown to Terrance Copper). In the fourth Matt Hasselbeck (414 total yards) erupted to three touchdown drives, two of them ending in Shaun Alexander rushes, a 19-yard score to Jerheme Urban, and a two-point conversion to Darrell Jackson, but the Seahawks could not hold on to a 39–29 lead; Testaverde found Keyshawn Johnson for a 34-yard touchdown with 1:54 to go; the Cowboys kicked onsides and recovered, then four Julius Jones rushes ended in a 17-yard score with 37 seconds remaining. The Seahawks' final drive petered out and the Cowboys had the stunning 43–39 win.

==== Week 14: at Minnesota Vikings ====
Week Fourteen: Seattle Seahawks at Minnesota Vikings – Game summary

Quarter	1	2	3	4	Total
Seahawks	7	14	3	3	27
Vikings	10	10	3	0	23

at Metrodome, Minneapolis

- Date: December 12
- Game time: 12:00pm local
- Game weather: indoors
- Game attendance: 64,110
- Referee: Bill Vinovich
- TV announcers (Fox): Joe Buck, Troy Aikman, Cris Collinsworth and Pam Oliver
- Gamecenter, Gamebook

Game information

First quarter

- MIN – Morten Andersen 48-yard field goal, 10:42 (MIN 3–0)
- MIN – Onterrio Smith 5-yard run (Morten Andersen kick), 3:42 (MIN 10–0)
- SEA – Bobby Engram 35-yard pass from Matt Hasselbeck (Josh Brown kick), 1:12 (MIN 10–7)

Second quarter

- SEA – Shaun Alexander 12-yard pass from Matt Hasselbeck (Josh Brown kick), 12:13 (SEA 14–10)
- MIN – Morten Andersen 32-yard field goal, 9:48 (SEA 14–13)
- MIN – Randy Moss 3-yard pass from Daunte Culpepper (Morten Andersen kick), 5:06 (MIN 20–14)
- SEA – Darrell Jackson 19-yard pass from Matt Hasselbeck (Josh Brown kick), 3:05 (SEA 21–20)

Third quarter

- MIN – Morten Andersen 31-yard field goal, 11:58 (MIN 23–21)
- SEA – Josh Brown 33-yard field goal, 6:42 (SEA 24–23)

Fourth quarter

- SEA – Josh Brown 28-yard field goal, 3:40 (SEA 27–23)

Top passers

- SEA – Matt Hasselbeck: 23/34, 334 yds, 3 TD, 2 INT
- MIN – Daunte Culpepper: 21/33, 270 yds, 1 TD

Top rushers

- SEA – Shaun Alexander: 27 car, 112 yds
- MIN – Onterrio Smith: 14 car, 56 yds, 1 TD

Top receivers

- SEA – Darrell Jackson: 10 rec, 135 yds, 1 TD
- MIN – Randy Moss: 4 rec, 104 yds, 1 TD

Team – pass – rush – total – to

- SEA – 317 – 138 – 455 – 2
- MIN – 261 – 113 – 374 – 2

The Seahawks rallied to beat the Vikings 27–23 on 334 yards and three touchdowns by Hasselbeck and 112 more rushing yards from Shaun Alexander. Darrell Jackson competed despite learning on game morning that his father had died; he caught ten passes for 135 yards and a go-ahead touchdown.

==== Week 15: at New York Jets ====
Week Fifteen: Seattle Seahawks at New York Jets – Game summary

Quarter	1	2	3	4	Total
Seahawks	7	7	0	0	14
Jets	3	21	6	7	37

at Giants Stadium, East Rutherford, New Jersey

- Date: December 19
- Game time: 1:02pm local
- Game weather: hazy, 45 °F (7 °C), 82% humidity, wind variable 5 miles per hour (8.0 km/h)
- Game attendance: 77,894
- Referee: Scott Green
- TV announcers (Fox): Joe Buck, Troy Aikman, Cris Collinsworth and Pam Oliver
- Gamecenter, Gamebook

Game information

First quarter

- NYJ – Doug Brien 21-yard field goal, 9:54 (NYJ 3–0)
- SEA – Jerry Rice 12-yard pass from Matt Hasselbeck (Josh Brown kick), 5:27 (SEA 7–3)

Second quarter

- NYJ – Curtis Martin 1-yard run (Doug Brien kick), 14:57 (NYJ 10–7)
- NYJ – Curtis Martin 3-yard run (Doug Brien kick), 7:44 (NYJ 17–7)
- NYJ – Santana Moss 32-yard pass from Chad Pennington (Doug Brien kick), 1:48 (NYJ 24–7)
- SEA – Jerramy Stevens 6-yard pass from Matt Hasselbeck (Josh Brown kick), 0:03 (NYJ 24–14)

Third quarter

- NYJ – Santana Moss 7-yard pass from Chad Pennington (PAT failed), 9:22 (NYJ 30–14)

Fourth quarter

- NYJ – Justin McCareins 5-yard pass from Chad Pennington (Doug Brien kick), 8:14 (NYJ 37–14)

Top passers

- SEA – Matt Hasselbeck: 22/30, 201 yds, 2 TD, 1 INT
- NYJ – Chad Pennington: 18/24, 253 yds, 3 TD

Top rushers

- SEA – Shaun Alexander: 19 car, 77 yds
- NYJ – Curtis Martin: 24 car, 134 yds, 2 TD

Top receivers

- SEA – Darrell Jackson: 4 rec, 45 yds
- NYJ – Jerald Sowell: 5 rec, 83 yds

Team – pass – rush – total – to

- SEA – 187 – 88 – 275 – 3
- NYJ – 253 – 229 – 482 – 0

Matt Hasselbeck managed two touchdowns in the first half but the game collapsed as the NY Jets scored 24 points in the first half then shut out the Seahawks while adding two more Chad Pennington touchdowns, marred by a missed PAT. Curtis Martin rushed for 134 yards and two scores, outpacing the entire Seahawks backfield (88 rushing yards).

==== Week 16: vs. Arizona Cardinals ====
Week Sixteen: Seattle Seahawks vs. Arizona Cardinals – Game summary

Quarter	1	2	3	4	Total
Cardinals	7	0	0	14	21
Seahawks	0	10	7	7	24

at Qwest Field, Seattle

- Date: December 26
- Game time: 1:16pm local
- Game weather: overcast, 46 °F (8 °C), 89% humidity, wind variable 3 miles per hour (4.8 km/h)
- Game attendance: 65,825
- Referee: Tony Corrente
- TV announcers (Fox): Curt Menefee, Tim Green and Tony Ventrella
- Gamecenter, Gamebook

Game information

First quarter

- ARI – Anquan Boldin 31-yard pass from Josh McCown (Neil Rackers kick), 4:23 (ARI 7–0)

Second quarter

- SEA – Shaun Alexander 1-yard run (Josh Brown kick), 4:44 (Tied 7–7)
- SEA – Josh Brown 34-yard field goal, 0:00 (SEA 10–7)

Third quarter

- SEA – Shaun Alexander 17-yard run (Josh Brown kick), 3:06 (SEA 17–7)

Fourth quarter

- SEA – Shaun Alexander 23-yard run (Josh Brown kick), 14:50 (SEA 24–7)
- ARI – Larry Fitzgerald 29-yard pass from Josh McCown (Neil Rackers kick), 11:32 (SEA 24–14)
- ARI – Larry Fitzgerald 29-yard pass from Josh McCown (Neil Rackers kick), 2:30 (SEA 24–21)

Top passers

- ARI – Josh McCown: 21/33, 248 yds, 3 TD, 2 INT
- SEA – Trent Dilfer: 10/26, 128 yds, 1 INT

Top rushers

- ARI – Emmitt Smith: 23 car, 65 yds
- SEA – Shaun Alexander: 30 car, 154 yds, 3 TD

Top receivers

- ARI – Anquan Boldin: 7 rec, 107 yds, 1 TD
- SEA – Darrell Jackson: 6 rec, 101 yds

Team – pass – rush – total – to

- ARI – 220 – 97 – 317 – 2
- SEA – 126 – 175 – 301 – 1

Shaun Alexander accounted for 154 yards and all three Seahawks touchdowns as Seattle returned to Qwest Field and edged the five-win Cardinals 24–21. Trent Dilfer subbed for Hasselbeck but managed only 128 passing yards.

==== Week 17: vs. Atlanta Falcons ====
Week Seventeen: Seattle Seahawks vs. Atlanta Falcons – Game summary

Quarter	1	2	3	4	Total
Falcons	7	10	0	9	26
Seahawks	7	7	7	7	28

at Qwest Field, Seattle

- Date: January 2
- Game time: 1:06pm local
- Game weather: clear, 40 °F (4 °C), 58% humidity, wind variable 5 miles per hour (8.0 km/h)
- Game attendance: 66,740
- Referee: Mike Carey
- TV announcers (Fox): Dick Stockton, Daryl Johnston and Tony Siragusa
- Gamecenter, Gamebook

Game information

First quarter

- ATL – Peerless Price 2-yard pass from Michael Vick (Jay Feely kick), 6:19 (ATL 7–0)
- SEA – Shaun Alexander 1-yard run (Josh Brown kick), 3:06 (Tied 7–7)

Second quarter

- ATL – Jay Feely 33-yard field goal, 8:32 (ATL 10–7)
- ATL – DeAngelo Hall 48-yard interception return (Jay Feely kick), 6:56 (ATL 17–6)
- SEA – Darrell Jackson 3-yard pass from Matt Hasselbeck (Josh Brown kick), 3:25 (ATL 17–14)

Third quarter

- SEA – Jerramy Stevens 3-yard pass from Matt Hasselbeck (Josh Brown kick), 7:35 (SEA 21–17)

Fourth quarter

- ATL – Jay Feely 40-yard field goal, 10:12 (SEA 21–20)
- SEA – Matt Hasselbeck 1-yard run (Josh Brown kick), 4:28 (SEA 28–20)
- ATL – Brian Finneran 3-yard pass from Matt Schaub (PAT failed), 0:00 (SEA 28–26)

Top passers

- ATL – Matt Schaub: 14/22, 133 yds, 1 TD, 1 INT
- SEA – Matt Hasselbeck: 21/27, 191 yds, 2 TD, 1 INT

Top rushers

- ATL – Warrick Dunn: 25 car, 132 yds
- SEA – Shaun Alexander: 19 car, 80 yds, 1 TD

Top receivers

- ATL – Peerless Price: 7 rec, 46 yds, 1 TD
- SEA – Bobby Engram: 6 rec, 79 yds

Team – pass – rush – total – to

- ATL – 150 – 204 – 353 – 1
- SEA – 170 – 83 – 253 – 1

The Seahawks clinched the NFC West by erasing a 17–7 Falcons lead to win 28–26. It was the second time in three seasons the Falcons made the playoffs despite losing the regular-season finale.

=== Postseason ===
Seattle entered the postseason as the #4 seed in the NFC.

==== NFC Wild Card Playoff: vs. #5 St. Louis Rams ====
NFC Wild Card Playoff: #5 St. Louis Rams at #4 Seattle Seahawks – Game summary

Quarter	1	2	3	4	Total
Rams	7	7	3	10	27
Seahawks	3	7	3	7	20

at Qwest Field, Seattle

- Date: January 8
- Game time: 1:37pm local
- Game weather: partly cloudy, 45 °F (7 °C), 49% humidity, wind SE 9 miles per hour (14 km/h)
- Game attendance: 58,513
- Referee: Walt Coleman
- TV announcers (ABC): Mike Patrick, Joe Theismann, Paul Maguire, Suzy Kolber
- Gamecenter, Gamebook

Game information

First quarter

- STL – Torry Holt 15-yard pass from Marc Bulger (Jeff Wilkins kick), 11:33 (STL 7–0)
- SEA – Josh Brown 47-yard field goal, 2:05 (STL 7–3)

Second quarter

- STL – Marshall Faulk 1-yard run (Jeff Wilkins kick), 13:32 (STL 14–3)
- SEA – Bobby Engram 19-yard pass from Matt Hasselbeck (Josh Brown kick), 8:18 (STL 14–10)

Third quarter

- SEA – Josh Brown 30-yard field goal, 8:52 (STL 14–13)
- STL – Jeff Wilkins 38-yard field goal, 2:35 (STL 17–13)

Fourth quarter

- SEA – Darrell Jackson 23-yard pass from Matt Hasselbeck (Josh Brown kick), 13:43 (SEA 20–17)
- STL – Jeff Wilkins 27-yard field goal, 8:07 (Tied 20–20)
- STL – Cam Cleeland 17-yard pass from Marc Bulger (Jeff Wilkins kick), 2:11 (STL 27–20)

Top passers

- STL – Marc Bulger: 18/32, 313 yds, 2 TD, 1 INT
- SEA – Matt Hasselbeck: 27/43, 341 yds, 2 TD, 1 INT

Top rushers

- STL – Marshall Faulk: 13 car, 55 yds, 1 TD
- SEA – Shaun Alexander: 15 car, 40 yds

Top receivers

- STL – Torry Holt: 6 rec, 108 yds, 1 TD
- SEA – Darrell Jackson: 12 rec, 128 yds, 1 TD

Team – pass – rush – total – to

- STL – 294 – 102 – 396 – 1
- SEA – 332 – 81 – 413 – 1

With the loss, the Seahawks lost to the Rams for the third time in the season.
