= 2002 Seattle Seahawks season =

American football team season

- Owner: Paul Allen
- General manager: Mike Holmgren
- Head coach: Mike Holmgren
- Home stadium: Seahawks Stadium

Results
- Record: 7–9
- Division place: 3rd NFC West
- Playoffs: Did not qualify
- All-Pros: None
- Pro Bowlers: OT Walter Jones

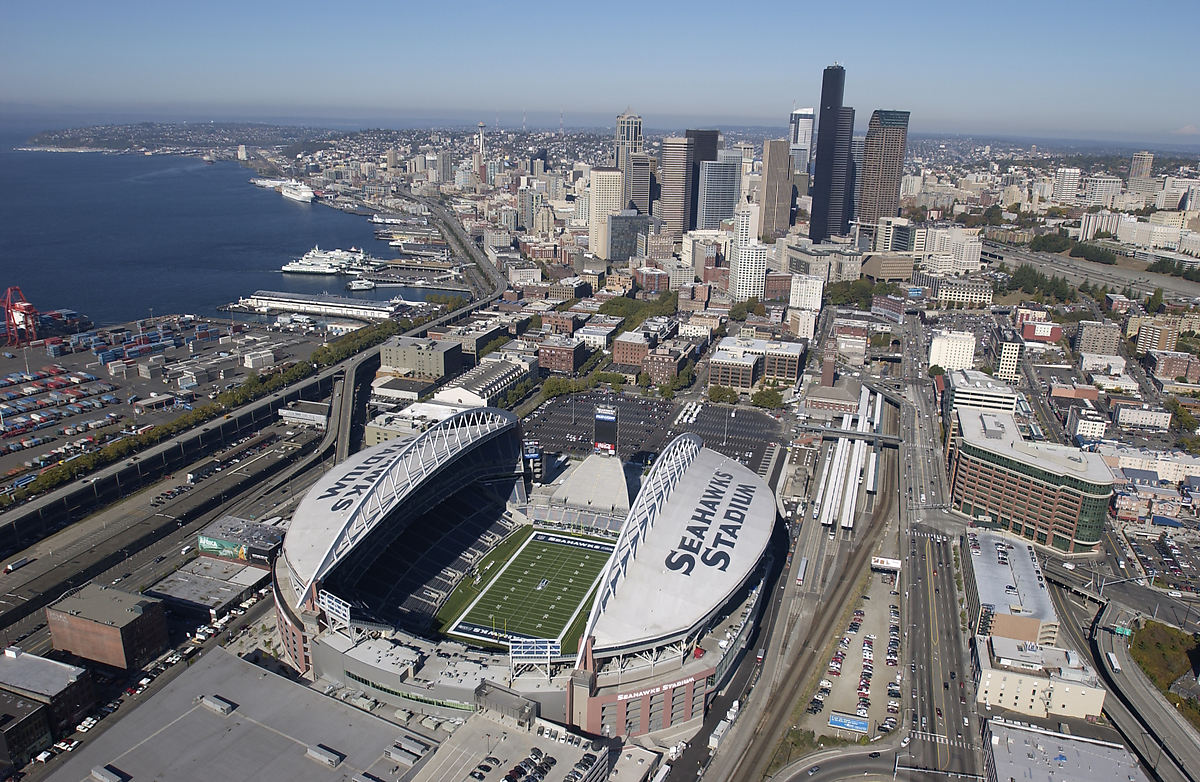
Aerial photo of Seahawks Stadium

The 2002 Seattle Seahawks season was the franchise's 27th season in the National Football League (NFL), the first season in Seahawks Stadium and the fourth under head coach Mike Holmgren. The Seahawks returned to the NFC West for the first time since their inaugural season of 1976, as part of the realignment that occurred when the Houston Texans joined the NFL as the 32nd team. The new stadium was constructed on the same site of their former stadium, the Kingdome. The Seahawks began the season in a new conference, in a new stadium, and with new uniforms.

== Offseason ==
Additions	Subtractions
DT Brandon Mitchell (Patriots)	TE Christian Fauria (Patriots)
T Jerry Wunsch (Buccaneers)	T Todd Weiner (Falcons)
	QB Brock Huard (Colts)
	LB Levon Kirkland (Eagles)
	RB Ricky Watters (retirement)

=== 2002 expansion draft ===
Seattle Seahawks selected during the expansion draft
Round	Overall	Name	Position	Expansion team
——	13	Charlie Rogers	Return specialist	Houston Texans

=== NFL draft ===
2002 Seattle Seahawks draft
Round	Pick	Player	Position	College	Notes
1	28	Jerramy Stevens	Tight end	Washington	
2	54	Maurice Morris	Running back	Oregon	
2	60	Anton Palepoi	Defensive end	UNLV	
3	85	Kris Richard	Cornerback	USC	
4	120	Terreal Bierria	Safety	Georgia	
5	146	Rocky Bernard	Defensive tackle	Texas A&M	
5	169	Ryan Hannam	Tight end	Northern Iowa	
5	171	Matt Hill	Offensive tackle	Boise State	
6	194	Craig Jarrett	Punter	Michigan State	
7	232	Jeff Kelly	Quarterback	Southern Mississippi	
Made roster † Pro Football Hall of Fame * Made at least one Pro Bowl during career

=== Undrafted free agents ===
2002 undrafted free agents of note
Player	Position	College
D. D. Lewis	Linebacker	Texas
Nakoa McElrath	Wide recevier	Washington State
John Niklos	Fullback	Western Illinois
Jon Pendergrass	Wide receiver	Southern Illinois
Merceda Perry	Linebacker	North Carolina
Ryan Van Dyke	Quarterback	Michigan State
Damion Wright	Guard	Weber State

== Personnel ==
=== Staff / Coaches ===
2002 Seattle Seahawks staff
Front Office: Chairman – Paul Allen; President – Bob Whitsitt; Executive Vice President of Football Operations/General Manager – Mike Holmgren; Senior Vice President – Mike Reinfeldt; Vice President of Football Operations – Ted Thompson; Director of Player Personnel – John Schneider; Director of Pro Personnel – Will Lewis; Director of College Scouting – Scot McCloughan; Head Coaches: Head Coach – Mike Holmgren; Assistant Head Coach/Offensive Line – Tom Lovat; Area Scout - Scott Fitterer; Offensive Coaches: Offensive Coordinator – Gil Haskell; Quarterbacks – Jim Zorn; Running Backs – Stump Mitchell; Wide Receivers – Nolan Cromwell; Tight Ends – Jim Lind; Offensive Quality Control – Jerry Colquitt	Defensive Coaches: Defensive Coordinator – Steve Sidwell; Defensive Line – Larry Brooks; Linebackers – Johnny Holland; Defensive Backs – Ken Flajole; Quality Control / Assistant Defensive Backs (Secondary) Coach – Clayton Lopez; Special Teams Coaches: Special Teams Coordinator – Pete Rodriguez; Assistant Special Teams – Mark Michaels; Strength and Conditioning: Strength and Conditioning – Kent Johnston; Assistant Strength and Conditioning – Rod Springer

== Final roster ==
2002 Seattle Seahawks roster
Quarterbacks (QB): 3 Jeff George; 8 Matt Hasselbeck; 17 Jeff Kelly; Running backs (RB): 37 Shaun Alexander; 44 Heath Evans FB; 20 Maurice Morris; 38 Mack Strong FB; Wide receivers (WR): 85 Alex Bannister; 84 Bobby Engram; 82 Darrell Jackson; 81 Koren Robinson; 88 James Williams; Tight ends (TE): 83 Ryan Hannam; 89 Itula Mili; 86 Jerramy Stevens	Offensive linemen (OL): 79 Konrad Dean G; 62 Chris Gray G; 74 Matt Hill T; 71 Walter Jones T; 68 Dennis Norman C; 72 Chris Terry T; 61 Robbie Tobeck C; 69 Floyd Wedderburn G; 77 Floyd Womack T; 70 Jerry Wunsch G/T; Defensive linemen (DL): 99 Rocky Bernard DT; 78 Antonio Cochran DE; 90 Chad Eaton DT; 95 John Hilliard DE; 64 Norris McCleary DT; 67 Rich Owens DE; 91 Anton Palepoi DE; 93 John Randle DT; 98 Cedric Woodard DT	Linebackers (LB): 55 Marcus Bell OLB; 57 Orlando Huff MLB; 54 D. D. Lewis OLB; 53 Keith Miller MLB; 51 Anthony Simmons OLB; 59 Tim Terry OLB; Defensive backs (DB): 30 Walter Bernard CB; 34 Terreal Bierria SS; 28 Harold Blackmon CB/S; 33 Doug Evans CB; 29 Curtis Fuller FS; 21 Ken Lucas CB; 31 Marcus Robertson FS; 24 Shawn Springs CB; 25 Reggie Tongue SS; 27 Willie Williams CB; Special teams (ST): 52 J.P. Darche LS; 10 Jeff Feagles P; 9 Rian Lindell K	Practice squad: 60 Joe Brown DT; 66 Joey Evans DE; 19 Emmett Johnson WR; 65 Kaulana Noa T; 39 Rodnick Phillips RB; 63 Brandon Winey T (IR); Reserve: 94 Chad Brown LB (IR); 4 Trent Dilfer QB (IR); 76 Steve Hutchinson G (IR); 58 Isaiah Kacyvenski LB (IR); 92 Lamar King DE (IR); 75 Chris McIntosh T (IR); 97 Brandon Mitchell DT (IR); 42 Kris Richard CB (IR); Rookies in italics 53 active, 9 reserve, 5 practice squad

== Season highlights ==
- September 8: The Seahawks began their new life as an NFC team with an interconference run through their old division, the AFC West. At Oakland Matt Hasselbeck threw for 155 yards and two touchdowns but Rich Gannon threw for 214 yards and two scores while he and four Raiders backs combined for 221 rushing yards and two touchdowns in a 31–17 Raiders win.
- September 15: The Seahawks opened their new stadium by being outscored 14–3 in the fourth quarter, losing 24–13 to the Cardinals. Trent Dilfer started instead of Hasselback and threw for 352 yards but managed only one touchdown.
- September 22: The Seahawks traveled to Giants Stadium and lost a 9–6 battle of field goals to the Giants. The Hawks managed just 145 yards of offense.
- September 29: The Seahawks finally got on the victory board by crushing the Vikings 48–23. The two teams combined for 353 rushing yards and seven touchdowns, while the Seahawks won the turnover battle, forcing two fumbles while picking off Daunte Culpepper twice.
- Monday Night Football, October 14: Trent Dilfer was picked off twice as Jeff Garcia managed two touchdowns in a 28–21 Niners win. Shaun Alexander rushed for 96 yards and a score. Niners receiver Terrell Owens (six catches for 84 yards and two scores) autographed the ball in the endzone after one of his touchdowns and gave it to his agent, causing a stir.
- October 20: The Seahawks traveled to St. Louis and fell to 1–5 after Marshall Faulk erupted to four touchdowns, three of them on the ground as the Rams won 37–20. Trent Dilfer was intercepted twice.
- October 27: Against the Seahawks, Cowboys running back Emmitt Smith surpassed Walter Payton as the NFL's all-time leading rusher. This game also marked the team's full-time switch at starting quarterback; starter Trent Dilfer was injured after compiling just 46 passing yards; backup Matt Hasselbeck replaced Dilfer and became starter the next week.

== Schedule ==
=== Preseason ===
Week	Date	Opponent	Result	Record	Game site	Recap
1	August 10	Indianapolis Colts	**L** 10–28	0–1	Seahawks Stadium	Recap
2	August 16	at San Diego Chargers	**L** 14–24	0–2	Qualcomm Stadium	Recap
3	August 24	Kansas City Chiefs	**W** 17–14	1–2	Seahawks Stadium	Recap
4	August 29	at Denver Broncos	**L** 0–31	1–3	Mile High Stadium	Recap

Source: Seahawks Media Guides

=== Regular season ===
Divisional matchups have the NFC West playing the NFC East and the AFC West.

Week	Date	Opponent	Result	Record	Game site	Recap
1	September 8	at Oakland Raiders	**L** 17–31	0–1	Network Associates Coliseum	Recap
2	September 15	**Arizona Cardinals**	**L** 13–24	0–2	Seahawks Stadium	Recap
3	September 22	at New York Giants	**L** 6–9	0–3	Giants Stadium	Recap
4	September 29	Minnesota Vikings	**W** 48–23	1–3	Seahawks Stadium	Recap
5	Bye					
6	October 14	**San Francisco 49ers**	**L** 21–28	1–4	Seahawks Stadium	Recap
7	October 20	at **St. Louis Rams**	**L** 20–37	1–5	Edward Jones Dome	Recap
8	October 27	at Dallas Cowboys	**W** 17–14	2–5	Texas Stadium	Recap
9	November 3	Washington Redskins	**L** 3–14	2–6	Seahawks Stadium	Recap
10	November 10	at **Arizona Cardinals**	**W** 27–6	3–6	Sun Devil Stadium	Recap
11	November 17	Denver Broncos	**L** 9–31	3–7	Seahawks Stadium	Recap
12	November 24	Kansas City Chiefs	**W** 39–32	4–7	Seahawks Stadium	Recap
13	December 1	at **San Francisco 49ers**	**L** 24–31	4–8	3Com Park	Recap
14	December 8	Philadelphia Eagles	**L** 20–27	4–9	Seahawks Stadium	Recap
15	December 15	at Atlanta Falcons	**W** 30–24 (OT)	5–9	Georgia Dome	Recap
16	December 22	**St. Louis Rams**	**W** 30–10	6–9	Seahawks Stadium	Recap
17	December 29	at San Diego Chargers	**W** 31–28 (OT)	7–9	Qualcomm Stadium	Recap

Bold indicates division opponents.
Source: 2002 NFL season results

== Standings ==
=== Division ===
NFC West
	W	L	T	PCT	DIV	CONF	PF	PA	STK
^{(4)} San Francisco 49ers	10	6	0	.625	5–1	8–4	367	351	L1
St. Louis Rams	7	9	0	.438	4–2	5–7	316	369	W1
Seattle Seahawks	7	9	0	.438	2–4	5–7	355	369	W3
Arizona Cardinals	5	11	0	.313	1–5	5–7	262	417	L3

=== Conference ===
NFC
#	Team	Division	W	L	T	PCT	DIV	CONF	SOS	SOV
Division leaders
1 (Note: Philadelphia finished ahead of Tampa Bay and Green Bay based on conference record (11–1 vs 9–3/9–3).)	Philadelphia Eagles	East	12	4	0	.750	5–1	11–1	.469	.432
2 (Note: Tampa Bay finished ahead of Green Bay based on head-to-head victory.)	Tampa Bay Buccaneers	South	12	4	0	.750	4–2	9–3	.482	.432
3	Green Bay Packers	North	12	4	0	.750	5–1	9–3	.451	.414
4	San Francisco 49ers	West	10	6	0	.625	5–1	8–4	.504	.450
Wild Cards
5	New York Giants	East	10	6	0	.625	5–1	8–4	.482	.450
6	Atlanta Falcons	South	9	6	1	.594	4–2	7–5	.494	.429
Did not qualify for the postseason
7	New Orleans Saints	South	9	7	0	.563	3–3	7–5	.498	.566
8 (Note: St. Louis finished ahead of Seattle based on division record (4–2 to 2–4).)	St. Louis Rams	West	7	9	0	.438	4–2	5–7	.508	.446
9	Seattle Seahawks	West	7	9	0	.438	2–4	5–7	.506	.433
10 (Note: Washington finished ahead of Carolina based on common games (2–3 to 1–4))	Washington Redskins	East	7	9	0	.438	1–5	4–8	.527	.438
11	Carolina Panthers	South	7	9	0	.438	1–5	4–8	.486	.357
12	Minnesota Vikings	North	6	10	0	.375	4–2	5–7	.498	.417
13 (Note: Arizona finished ahead of Dallas based on head-to-head victory.)	Arizona Cardinals	West	5	11	0	.313	1–5	5–7	.500	.400
14	Dallas Cowboys	East	5	11	0	.313	1–5	3–9	.500	.475
15	Chicago Bears	North	4	12	0	.250	2–4	3–9	.521	.430
16	Detroit Lions	North	3	13	0	.188	1–5	3–9	.494	.375
Tiebreakers (Note: When breaking ties for three or more teams under the NFL's rules, they are first broken within divisions, then comparing only the highest-ranked remaining team from each division.)

== Game summaries ==
=== Preseason ===
==== Week P1: vs. Indianapolis Colts ====
Preseason Week One: Seattle Seahawks vs. Indianapolis Colts – Game summary

Quarter	1	2	3	4	Total
Colts	0	7	14	7	28
Seahawks	10	0	0	0	10

at Seahawks Stadium, Seattle

- Date: August 10
- Game time: 7:08pm local
- Game weather: clear, 76 °F (24 °C), 54% humidity, wind S 5 miles per hour (8.0 km/h)
- Game attendance: 52,902
- Referee: Larry Nemmers
- TV: KCPQ
- Gamecenter, Gamebook

==== Week P2: at San Diego Chargers ====
Preseason Week Two: Seattle Seahawks at San Diego Chargers – Game summary

Quarter	1	2	3	4	Total
Seahawks	0	7	0	7	14
Chargers	7	3	7	7	24

at Qualcomm Stadium, San Diego

- Date: August 16
- Game time: 8:05pm local
- Game weather: clear, 68 °F (20 °C), 71% humidity, wind WSW 8 miles per hour (13 km/h)
- Game attendance: N/A
- Referee: Mike Carey
- TV: KCPQ
- Gamecenter, Gamebook

==== Week P3: vs. Kansas City Chiefs ====
Preseason Week Three: Seattle Seahawks vs. Kansas City Chiefs – Game summary

Quarter	1	2	3	4	Total
Chiefs	0	0	7	7	14
Seahawks	0	10	0	7	17

at Seahawks Stadium, Seattle

- Date: August 24
- Game time: 7:05pm local
- Game weather: clear, 79 °F (26 °C), 47% humidity, wind NW 5 miles per hour (8.0 km/h)
- Game attendance: 49,036
- Referee: Ed Hochuli
- TV: KCPQ
- Gamecenter, Gamebook

==== Week P4: at Denver Broncos ====
Preseason Week Four: Seattle Seahawks at Denver Broncos – Game summary

Quarter	1	2	3	4	Total
Seahawks	0	0	0	0	0
Broncos	21	3	0	7	31

at Invesco Field at Mile High, Denver

- Date: August 29
- Game time: 7:10pm local
- Game weather: mostly cloudy, 65 °F (18 °C), 69% humidity, wind SE 7 miles per hour (11 km/h)
- Game attendance: 71,755
- Referee: Ron Blum
- TV: KCPQ
- Gamecenter, Gamebook

=== Regular season ===
==== Week 1: at Oakland Raiders ====
Week 1: Seattle Seahawks at Oakland Raiders – Game summary

Quarter	1	2	3	4	Total
Seahawks	7	0	0	10	17
Raiders	7	21	3	0	31

at Network Associates Coliseum, Oakland, California

- Date: September 8
- Game time: 1:17pm local
- Game weather: clear, 70 °F (21 °C), 47% humidity, wind W 7 miles per hour (11 km/h)
- Game attendance: 53,260
- Referee: Larry Nemmers
- TV announcers (Fox): Ron Pitts, Dave Krieg, and Brian Webber
- Gamecenter, Gamebook

Game information

First quarter

- OAK – Tim Brown 8-yard pass from Rich Gannon (Sebastian Janikowski kick), 10:47 (OAK 7–0)
- SEA – Itula Mili 1-yard pass from Matt Hasselbeck (Rian Lindell kick), 6:53 (Tied 7–7)

Second quarter

- OAK – Charlie Garner 20-yard run (Sebastian Janikowski kick), 13:51 (OAK 14–7)
- OAK – Charlie Garner 26-yard run (Sebastian Janikowski kick), 9:38 (OAK 21–7)
- OAK – Randy Jordan 12-yard run (Sebastian Janikowski kick), 3:17 (OAK 28–7)

Third quarter

- OAK – Sebastian Janikowski 27-yard field goal, 9:02 (OAK 31–7)

Fourth quarter

- SEA – Rian Lindell 19-yard field goal, 14:57 (OAK 31–10)
- SEA – Shaun Alexander 11-yard pass from Matt Hasselbeck (Rian Lindell kick), 5:44 (OAK 31–17)

Top passers

- SEA – Matt Hasselbeck: 23/32, 155 yds, 2 TD
- OAK – Rich Gannon: 19/28, 214 yds, 2 TD, 1 INT

Top rushers

- SEA – Shaun Alexander: 13 car, 36 yds
- OAK – Charlie Garner: 15 car, 127 yds, 1 TD

Top receivers

- SEA – Koren Robinson: 5 rec, 39 yds
- OAK – Charlie Garner: 5 rec, 64 yds, 1 TD

Team – pass – rush – total – to

- SEA – 143 – 43 – 186 – 0
- OAK – 202 – 221 – 423 – 2

==== Week 2: vs. Arizona Cardinals ====
Week 2: Arizona Cardinals (0–1) at Seattle Seahawks (0–1) – Game summary

Quarter	1	2	3	4	Total
Cardinals	3	0	7	14	24
Seahawks	3	7	0	3	13

at Seahawks Stadium, Seattle

- Date: September 15
- Game time: 1:05pm local
- Game weather: overcast, 62 °F (17 °C), 75% humidity, wind S 8 miles per hour (13 km/h)
- Game attendance: 63,104
- Referee: Tony Corrente
- TV announcers (Fox): Curt Menefee, Tim Ryan, Kevin McCabe
- Gamecenter, Gamebook

Game information

First quarter

- SEA – Rian Lindell 46-yard field goal, 9:09 (SEA 3–0)
- ARI – Bill Gramatica 23-yard field goal, 3:05 (Tied 3–3)

Second quarter

- SEA – Itula Mili 1-yard pass from Trent Dilfer (Rian Lindell kick), 4:10 (SEA 10–3)

Third quarter

- ARI – Thomas Jones 58-yard run (Bill Gramatica kick), 11:59 (Tied 10–10)

Fourth quarter

- SEA – Rian Lindell 18-yard field goal, 12:52 (SEA 13–10)
- ARI – MarTay Jenkins 95-yard kickoff return (Bill Gramatica kick), 12:41 (ARI 17–13)
- ARI – Frank Sanders 4-yard pass from Jake Plummer (Bill Gramatica kick), 3:18 (ARI 24–13)

Top passers

- ARI – Jake Plummer: 10/22, 107 yds, 1 TD, 1 INT
- SEA – Trent Dilfer: 29/47, 352 yds, 1 TD

Top rushers

- ARI – Thomas Jones: 24 car, 173 yds, 1 TD
- SEA – Shaun Alexander: 17 car, 37 yds

Top receivers

- ARI – David Boston: 4 rec, 49 yds,
- SEA – Darrell Jackson: 10 rec, 174 yds

Team – pass – rush – total – to

- ARI – 98 – 249 – 347 – 1
- SEA – 345 – 81 – 426 – 1

==== Week 3: at New York Giants ====
Week 3: Seattle Seahawks (0–2) at New York Giants (1–1) – Game summary

Quarter	1	2	3	4	Total
Seahawks	3	3	0	0	6
Giants	0	0	3	6	9

at Giants Stadium, East Rutherford, New Jersey

- Date: September 22
- Game time: 4:14pm local
- Game weather: clear, 82 °F (28 °C), 49% humidity, wind SE 8 miles per hour (13 km/h)
- Game attendance: 78,551
- Referee: Jeff Triplette
- TV announcers (Fox): Sam Rosen, Bill Maas
- Gamecenter, Gamebook

Game information

First quarter

- SEA – Rian Lindell 42-yard field goal, 6:24 (SEA 3–0)

Second quarter

- SEA – Rian Lindell 27-yard field goal, 4:05 (SEA 6–0)

Third quarter

- NYG – Matt Bryant 33-yard field goal, 8:06 (SEA 6–3)

Fourth quarter

- NYG – Matt Bryant 21-yard field goal, 12:05 (Tied 6–6)
- NYG – Matt Bryant 47-yard field goal, 2:04 (NYG 9–6)

Top passers

- SEA – Trent Dilfer: 16/25, 118 yds, 1 INT
- NYG – Kerry Collins: 23/38, 282 yds

Top rushers

- SEA – Shaun Alexander: 14 car, 37 yds
- NYG – Tiki Barber: 21 car, 50 yds

Top receivers

- SEA – Darrell Jackson: 7 rec, 54 yds
- NYG – Amani Toomer: 4 rec, 100 yds

Team – pass – rush – total – to

- SEA – 105 – 40 – 145 – 1
- NYG – 257 – 94 – 351 – 0

==== Week 4: vs. Minnesota Vikings ====
Week 4: Minnesota Vikings (0–3) at Seattle Seahawks (0–3) – Game summary

Quarter	1	2	3	4	Total
Vikings	7	3	7	6	23
Seahawks	14	31	0	3	48

at Seahawks Stadium, Seattle, Washington

- Date: September 29, 2002
- Game time: 8:35 p.m. EDT/5:35 p.m. PDT
- Game weather: Sunny, 59 °F (15 °C)
- Game attendance: 65,212
- Referee: Dick Hantak (105)
- TV announcers (ESPN): Mike Patrick, Joe Theismann and Suzy Kolber
- Recap, Game Book

Game information

First quarter

- SEA – Shaun Alexander 2-yard run (Rian Lindell kick), 11:17. Seahawks 7–0. Drive: 11 plays, 74 yards, 3:43.
- SEA – Shaun Alexander 20-yard run (Rian Lindell kick), 7:24. Seahawks 14–0. Drive: 4 plays, 72 yards, 2:12.
- MIN – Daunte Culpepper 12-yard run (Gary Anderson kick), 1:49. Seahawks 14–7. Drive: 11 plays, 77 yards, 5:35.

Second quarter

- SEA – Rian Lindell 35-yard field goal, 11:46. Seahawks 17–7. Drive: 12 plays, 53 yards, 5:03.
- MIN – Gary Anderson 35-yard field goal, 3:13. Seahawks 17–10. Drive: 14 plays, 51 yards, 8:33.
- SEA – Shaun Alexander 80-yard pass from Trent Dilfer (Rian Lindell kick), 2:53. Seahawks 24–10. Drive: 1 play, 80 yards, 0:20.
- SEA – Shaun Alexander 3-yard run (Rian Lindell kick), 1:57. Seahawks 31–10. Drive: 3 plays, 29 yards, 0:50.
- SEA – Shaun Alexander 14-yard run (Rian Lindell kick), 1:48. Seahawks 38–10. Drive: 1 play, 14 yards, 0:04.
- SEA – Reggie Tongue 46-yard interception return (Rian Lindell kick), 1:06. Seahawks 45–10.

Third quarter

- MIN – Moe Williams 3-yard run (Gary Anderson kick), 12:07. Seahawks 45–17. Drive: 2 plays, 14 yards, 0:35.

Fourth quarter

- MIN – Moe Williams 5-yard run (run failed), 8:56. Seahawks 45–23. Drive: 11 plays, 55 yards, 4:04.
- SEA – Rian Lindell 21-yard field goal, 2:48. Seahawks 48–23. Drive: 10 plays, 47 yards, 6:08.

Top passers

- MIN – Daunte Culpepper – 29/53, 273 yards, 2 INT
- SEA – Trent Dilfer – 13/28, 222 yards, TD

Top rushers

- MIN – Michael Bennett – 15 rushes, 91 yards
- SEA – Shaun Alexander – 24 rushes, 139 yards, 4 TD

Top receivers

- MIN – Moe Williams – 7 receptions, 77 yards
- SEA – Shaun Alexander – 3 receptions, 92 yards, TD

==== Week 6: vs. San Francisco 49ers ====
Week 6: San Francisco 49ers (3–1) at Seattle Seahawks (1–3) – Game summary

Quarter	1	2	3	4	Total
49ers	10	3	7	8	28
Seahawks	7	7	7	0	21

at Seahawks Stadium, Seattle

- Date: October 14
- Game time: 6:09pm local
- Game weather: clear, 64 °F (18 °C), 48% humidity, wind N 6 miles per hour (9.7 km/h)
- Game attendance: 66,420
- Referee: Bill Leavy
- TV announcers (ABC): Al Michaels, John Madden, Melissa Stark
- Gamecenter, Gamebook

Game information

First quarter

- SF – José Cortéz 35-yard field goal, 10:06 (SF 3–0)
- SF – Terrell Owens 8-yard pass from Jeff Garcia (José Cortéz kick), 6:50 (SF 10–0)
- SEA – Mack Strong 5-yard pass from Trent Dilfer (Rian Lindell kick), 1:45 (SF 10–7)

Second quarter

- SEA – Bobby Engram 61-yard punt return (Rian Lindell kick), 5:41 (SEA 14–10)
- SF – José Cortéz 29-yard field goal, 2:09 (SEA 14–13)

Third quarter

- SF – Kevan Barlow 6-yard run (José Cortéz kick), 5:29 (SF 20–14)
- SEA – Shaun Alexander 1-yard run (Rian Lindell kick), 1:11 (SEA 21–20)

Fourth quarter

- SF – Terrell Owens 37-yard pass from Jeff Garcia (2-pt PAT: Garrison Hearst pass from Jeff Garcia), 7:46 (SF 28–21)

Top passers

- SF – Jeff Garcia: 16/29, 202 yds, 2 TD
- SEA – Trent Dilfer: 21/31, 212 yds, 1 TD, 2 INT

Top rushers

- SF – Kevan Barlow: 12 car, 68 yds, 1 TD
- SEA – Shaun Alexander: 25 car, 96 yds, 1 TD

Top receivers

- SF – Terrell Owens: 6 rec, 84 yds, 2 TD
- SEA – Bobby Engram: 6 rec, 85 yds

Team – pass – rush – total – to

- SF – 190 – 161 – 351 – 0
- SEA – 211 – 123 – 334 – 2

==== Week 7: at St. Louis Rams ====
Week 7: Seattle Seahawks (1–4) at St. Louis Rams (1–5) – Game summary

Quarter	1	2	3	4	Total
Seahawks	0	14	0	6	20
Rams	7	6	10	14	37

at Edward Jones Dome, St. Louis, Missouri

- Date: October 20
- Game time: 12:02pm local
- Game weather: indoors
- Game attendance: 65,931
- Referee: Terry McAulay
- TV announcers (Fox): Scott Graham, Sean Jones, Martin Kilcoyne
- Gamecenter, Gamebook

Game information

First quarter

- STL – Marshall Faulk 6-yard pass from Marc Bulger (Jeff Wilkins kick), 6:00 (STL 7–0)

Second quarter

- STL – Jeff Wilkins 31-yard field goal, 7:11 (STL 10–0)
- SEA – Koren Robinson 79-yard pass from Trent Dilfer (Rian Lindell kick), 6:51 (STL 10–7)
- STL – Jeff Wilkins 45-yard field goal, 0:29 (STL 13–7)
- SEA – Maurice Morris 97-yard kickoff return (Rian Lindell kick), 0:16 (SEA 14–13)

Third quarter

- STL – Marshall Faulk 3-yard run (Jeff Wilkins kick), 5:08 (STL 20–14)
- STL – Jeff Wilkins 47-yard field goal, 3:23 (STL 23–14)

Fourth quarter

- STL – Marshall Faulk 2-yard run (Jeff Wilkins kick), 12:12 (STL 30–14)
- STL – Marshall Faulk 1-yard run (Jeff Wilkins kick), 6:05 (STL 37–14)
- SEA – Chad Eaton 1-yard fumble return (PAT failed), 3:28 (STL 37–20)

Top passers

- SEA – Trent Dilfer: 8/25, 232 yds, 1 TD, 2 INT
- STL – Marc Bulger: 22/40, 265 yds, 1 TD, 1 INT

Top rushers

- SEA – Shaun Alexander: 12 car, 30 yds
- STL – Marshall Faulk: 32 car, 183 yds, 3 TD

Top receivers

- SEA – Koren Robinson: 3 rec, 166 yds, 1 TD
- STL – Torry Holt: 3 rec, 71 yds

Team – pass – rush – total – to

- SEA – 240 – 50 – 290 – 3
- STL – 260 – 218 – 478 – 2

==== Week 8: at Dallas Cowboys ====
Week 8: Seattle Seahawks (1–5) at Dallas Cowboys (3–4) – Game summary

Quarter	1	2	3	4	Total
Seahawks	0	7	0	10	17
Cowboys	0	0	7	7	14

at Texas Stadium, Irving, Texas

- Date: October 27
- Game time: 12:04pm local
- Game weather: cloudy, 60 °F (16 °C), 96% humidity, wind calm
- Game attendance: 63,854
- Referee: Mike Carey
- TV announcers (Fox): Pat Summerall, Daryl Johnston, Pam Oliver
- Gamecenter, Gamebook

Game information

First quarter

- No scoring plays

Second quarter

- SEA – Shaun Alexander 2-yard run (Rian Lindell kick), 0:12 (SEA 7–0)

Third quarter

- DAL – Joey Galloway 39-yard pass from Chad Hutchinson (Billy Cundiff kick), 0:26 (Tied 7–7)

Fourth quarter

- SEA – Shaun Alexander 5-yard run (Rian Lindell kick), 10:16 (SEA 14–7)
- DAL – Emmitt Smith 1-yard run (Billy Cundiff kick), 5:35 (Tied 14–14)
- SEA – Rian Lindell 20-yard field goal, 0:25 (SEA 17–14)

Top passers

- SEA – Matt Hasselbeck: 12/19, 131 yds, 1 INT
- DAL – Chad Hutchinson: 12/24, 145 yds, 1 TD

Top rushers

- SEA – Shaun Alexander: 23 car, 58 yds, 2 TD
- DAL – Emmitt Smith: 24 car, 109 yds, 1 TD

Top receivers

- SEA – Bobby Engram: 6 rec, 69 yds
- DAL – Joey Galloway: 4 rec, 62 yds, 1 TD

Team – pass – rush – total – to

- SEA – 170 – 97 – 267 – 2
- DAL – 132 – 105 – 237 – 1

==== Week 9: vs. Washington Redskins ====
Week 9: Washington Redskins (3–4) at Seattle Seahawks (2–5) – Game summary

Quarter	1	2	3	4	Total
Redskins	7	7	0	0	14
Seahawks	0	3	0	0	3

at Seahawks Stadium, Seattle

- Date: November 3
- Game time: 1:15pm local
- Game weather: clear, 49 °F (9 °C), 43% humidity, wind N 3 miles per hour (4.8 km/h)
- Game attendance: 64,325
- Referee: Ed Hochuli
- TV announcers (Fox): Sam Rosen, Bill Maas & Brian Webber
- Gamecenter, Gamebook

Game information

First quarter

- WAS – Darnerien McCants 11-yard pass from Shane Matthews (James Tuthill kick), 7:34 (WAS 7–0)

Second quarter

- SEA – Rian Lindell 23-yard field goal, 14:57 (WAS 7–3)
- WAS – Rod Gardner 19-yard pass from Shane Matthews (James Tuthill kick), 12:34 (WAS 14–3)

Third quarter

- No scoring plays

Fourth quarter

- No scoring plays

Top passers

- WAS – Shane Matthews: 10/27, 114 yds, 2 TD, 1 INT
- SEA – Matt Hasselbeck: 28/44, 264 yds

Top rushers

- WAS – Kenny Watson: 23 car, 110 yds
- SEA – Shaun Alexander: 19 car, 67 yds

Top receivers

- WAS – Rod Gardner: 4 rec, 47 yds, 1 TD
- SEA – Koren Robinson: 8 rec, 100 yds

Team – pass – rush – total – to

- WAS – 113 – 146 – 259 – 1
- SEA – 240 – 84 – 324 – 2

==== Week 10: at Arizona Cardinals ====
Week 10: Seattle Seahawks (2–6) at Arizona Cardinals (4–4) – Game summary

Quarter	1	2	3	4	Total
Seahawks	10	17	0	0	27
Cardinals	3	3	0	0	6

at Sun Devil Stadium, Tempe, Arizona

- Date: November 10
- Game time: 2:06pm local
- Game weather: clear, 76 °F (24 °C), 27% humidity, wind W 8 miles per hour (13 km/h)
- Game attendance: 29,252
- Referee: Walt Coleman
- TV announcers (Fox): Curt Menefee, Tim Ryan, Brent Ringenbach
- Gamecenter, Gamebook

Game information

First quarter

- SEA – Rian Lindell 23-yard field goal, 8:55 (SEA 3–0)
- ARI – Bill Gramatica 40-yard field goal, 6:04 (Tied 3–3)
- SEA – Shaun Alexander 5-yard run (Rian Lindell kick), 3:16 (SEA 10–3)

Second quarter

- SEA – Rian Lindell 30-yard field goal, 10:47 (SEA 13–3)
- SEA – Ryan Hannam 16-yard pass from Matt Hasselbeck (Rian Lindell kick), 8:38 (SEA 20–3)
- ARI – Bill Gramatica 27-yard field goal, 3:50 (SEA 20–6)
- SEA – Shaun Alexander 1-yard run (Rian Lindell kick), 0:16 (SEA 27–6)

Third quarter

- No scoring plays

Fourth quarter

- No scoring plays

Top passers

- SEA – Matt Hasselbeck: 23/31, 260 yds, 1 TD
- ARI – Jake Plummer: 17/29, 226 yds, 2 INT

Top rushers

- SEA – Maurice Morris: 15 car, 72 yds
- ARI – Marcel Shipp: 16 car, 85 yds

Top receivers

- SEA – Koren Robinson: 7 rec, 96 yds
- ARI – Jason McAddley: 5 rec, 113 yds

Team – pass – rush – total – to

- SEA – 255 – 151 – 406 – 0
- ARI – 226 – 111 – 337 – 5

==== Week 11: vs. Denver Broncos ====
Week 11: Denver Broncos (6–3) at Seattle Seahawks (3–6) – Game summary

Quarter	1	2	3	4	Total
Broncos	0	3	7	21	31
Seahawks	0	0	6	3	9

at Seahawks Stadium, Seattle

- Date: November 17
- Game time: 1:16pm local
- Game weather: partly cloudy, 53 °F (12 °C), 71% humidity, wind SW 8 miles per hour (13 km/h)
- Game attendance: 65,495
- Referee: Larry Nemmers
- TV announcers (CBS): Dick Enberg, Dan Dierdorf, and Bonnie Bernstein
- Gamecenter, Gamebook

Game information

First quarter

- No scoring plays

Second quarter

- DEN – Jason Elam 45-yard field goal, 5:02 (DEN 3–0)

Third quarter

- SEA – Rian Lindell 52-yard field goal, 13:06 (Tied 3–3)
- DEN – Mike Anderson 9-yard run (Jason Elam kick), 11:15 (DEN 10–3)
- SEA – Rian Lindell 37-yard field goal, 6:00 (DEN 10–6)

Fourth quarter

- DEN – Patrick Hape 1-yard pass from Steve Beuerlein (Jason Elam kick), 14:55 (DEN 17–6)
- SEA – Rian Lindell 29-yard field goal, 8:57 (DEN 17–9)
- DEN – Rod Smith 14-yard pass from Steve Beuerlein (Jason Elam kick), 5:20 (DEN 24–9)
- DEN – Deltha O'Neal 22-yard interception return (Jason Elam kick), 0:14 (DEN 31–9)

Top passers

- DEN – Brian Griese: 17/27, 194 yds, 1 INT
- SEA – Matt Hasselbeck: 22/36, 180 yds, 2 INT

Top rushers

- DEN – Clinton Portis: 23 car, 136 yds
- SEA – Shaun Alexander: 11 car, 18 yds

Top receivers

- DEN – Rod Smith: 5 rec, 58 yds, 1 TD
- SEA – Itula Mili: 4 rec, 41 yds

Team – pass – rush – total – to

- DEN – 199 – 202 – 401 – 1
- SEA – 153 – 51 – 204 – 3

==== Week 12: vs. Kansas City Chiefs ====
Week 12: Kansas City Chiefs (5–5) at Seattle Seahawks (3–7) – Game summary

Quarter	1	2	3	4	Total
Chiefs	10	7	0	15	32
Seahawks	0	21	7	11	39

at Seahawks Stadium, Seattle, Washington

- Date: November 24
- Game time: 3:05 p.m. CST/1:05 p.m. PST
- Game weather: Sunny, 50 °F (10 °C)
- Game attendance: 56,250
- Referee: Bernie Kukar
- TV announcers (CBS): Ian Eagle and Solomon Wilcots
- Recap, Game Book

Game information

First quarter

- KC – Priest Holmes 15-yard run (Morten Andersen kick), 10:51. Chiefs 7–0. Drive: 8 plays, 70 yards, 4:09.
- KC – Morten Andersen 31-yard field goal, 3:29. Chiefs 10–0. Drive: 10 plays, 60 yards, 5:44.

Second quarter

- SEA – Shaun Alexander 3-yard run (Rian Lindell kick), 7:23. Chiefs 10–7. Drive: 3 plays, 92 yards, 1:49.
- KC – Priest Holmes 64-yard pass from Trent Green (Morten Andersen kick), 7:08. Chiefs 17–7. Drive: 1 play, 64 yards, 0:24.
- SEA – Mack Strong 2-yard pass from Matt Hasselbeck (Rian Lindell kick), 2:36. Chiefs 17–14. Drive: 8 plays, 79 yards, 4:32.
- SEA – Jerramy Stevens 6-yard pass from Matt Hasselbeck (Rian Lindell kick), 0:06. Seahawks 21–17. Drive: 8 plays, 80 yards, 0:53.

Third quarter

- SEA – Koren Robinson 17-yard pass from Matt Hasselbeck (Rian Lindell kick), 11:47. Seahawks 28–17. Drive: 6 plays, 74 yards, 3:13.

Fourth quarter

- KC – Priest Holmes 4-yard run (Trent Green run), 14:57. Seahawks 28–25. Drive: 8 plays, 92 yards, 4:04.
- SEA – Rian Lindell 37-yard field goal, 10:42. Seahawks 31–25. Drive: 9 plays, 56 yards, 4:15.
- SEA – Shaun Alexander 46-yard run (Matt Hasselbeck run), 1:52. Seahawks 39–25. Drive: 11 plays, 94 yards, 3:58.
- KC – Marc Boerigter 15-yard pass from Trent Green (Morten Andersen kick), 0:31. Seahawks 39–32. Drive: 6 plays, 70 yards, 1:21.

Top passers

- KC – Trent Green – 26/34, 343 yards, 2 TD, INT
- SEA – Matt Hasselbeck – 25/36, 362 yards, 3 TD

Top rushers

- KC – Priest Holmes – 23 rushes, 197 yards, 2 TD
- SEA – Shaun Alexander – 23 rushes, 145 yards, 2 TD

Top receivers

- KC – Priest Holmes – 7 receptions, 110 yards, TD
- SEA – Koren Robinson – 8 receptions, 168 yards, TD

Team – pass – rush – total – to

- KC – 343 – 217 – 552 – 1
- SEA – 362 – 180 – 534 – 0

==== Week 13: at San Francisco 49ers ====
Week 13: Seattle Seahawks (4–7) at San Francisco 49ers (7–4) – Game summary

Quarter	1	2	3	4	Total
Seahawks	0	3	7	14	24
49ers	0	17	7	7	31

at 3Com Park, San Francisco

- Date: December 1
- Game time: 1:15pm local
- Game weather: clear, 58 °F (14 °C), 14% humidity, wind variable
- Game attendance: 67,594
- Referee: Tom White
- TV announcers (Fox): Pat Summerall, Brian Baldinger, Brian Webber
- Gamecenter, Gamebook

Game information

First quarter

- No scoring plays

Second quarter

- SEA – Rian Lindell 20-yard field goal, 14:31 (SEA 3–0)
- SF – Garrison Hearst 5-yard run (Jeff Chandler kick), 5:45 (SF 7–3)
- SF – Jimmy Williams 89-yard punt return (Jeff Chandler kick), 2:48 (SF 14–3)
- SF – Jeff Chandler 23-yard field goal, 0:20 (SF 17–3)

Third quarter

- SF – Garrison Hearst 1-yard run (Jeff Chandler kick), 10:12 (SF 24–3)
- SEA – Darrell Jackson 36-yard pass from Matt Hasselbeck (Rian Lindell kick), 8:52 (SF 24–10)

Fourth quarter

- SF – Garrison Hearst 1-yard run (Jeff Chandler kick), 13:25 (SF 31–10)
- SEA – Koren Robinson 15-yard pass from Matt Hasselbeck (Rian Lindell kick), 3:50 (SF 31–17)
- SEA – Darrell Jackson 3-yard pass from Matt Hasselbeck (Rian Lindell kick), 1:57 (SF 31–24)

Top passers

- SEA – Matt Hasselbeck: 30/55, 427 yds, 3 TD, 2 INT
- SF – Jeff Garcia: 16/29, 164 yds, 2 INT

Top rushers

- SEA – Shaun Alexander: 16 car, 74 yds
- SF – Garrison Hearst: 31 car, 124 yds, 3 TD

Top receivers

- SEA – Darrell Jackson: 7 rec, 114 yds, 2 TD
- SF – Tai Streets: 6 rec, 66 yds

Team – pass – rush – total – to

- SEA – 427 – 80 – 507 – 3
- SF – 157 – 142 – 299 – 2

==== Week 14: vs. Philadelphia Eagles ====
Week 14: Philadelphia Eagles (9–3) at Seattle Seahawks (4–8) – Game summary

Quarter	1	2	3	4	Total
Eagles	7	13	7	0	27
Seahawks	6	0	7	7	20

at Seahawks Stadium, Seattle

- Date: December 8
- Game time: 1:05pm local
- Game weather: clear, 45 °F (7 °C), 74% humidity, wind S 5 miles per hour (8.0 km/h)
- Game attendance: 59,862
- Referee: Bill Carollo
- TV announcers (Fox): Curt Menefee, Tim Ryan, and Brent Ringenbach
- Gamecenter, Gamebook

Game information

First quarter

- SEA – Rian Lindell 34-yard field goal, 9:19 (SEA 3–0)
- SEA – Rian Lindell 43-yard field goal, 4:53 (SEA 6–0)
- PHI – James Thrash 6-yard pass from A.J. Feeley (David Akers kick), 0:13 (PHI 7–6)

Second quarter

- PHI – Duce Staley 21-yard run (David Akers kick), 8:59 (PHI 14–6)
- PHI – David Akers 33-yard field goal, 4:00 (PHI 17–6)
- PHI – David Akers 40-yard field goal, 0:08 (PHI 20–6)

Third quarter

- PHI – Todd Pinkston 20-yard pass from A.J. Feeley (David Akers kick), 9:51 (PHI 27–6)

Fourth quarter

- SEA – Darrell Jackson 8-yard pass from Matt Hasselbeck (Rian Lindell kick), 2:04 (PHI 27–13)
- SEA – Jerramy Stevens 11-yard pass from Matt Hasselbeck (Rian Lindell kick), 0:45 (PHI 27–20)

Top passers

- PHI – A.J. Feeley: 21/35, 190 yds, 2 TD, 1 INT
- SEA – Matt Hasselbeck: 24/45, 223 yds, 2 TD, 3 INT

Top rushers

- PHI – Duce Staley: 21 car, 100 yds, 1 TD
- SEA – Shaun Alexander: 17 car, 123 yds

Top receivers

- PHI – Todd Pinkston: 7 rec, 88 yds, 1 TD
- SEA – Bobby Engram: 5 rec, 48 yds

Team – pass – rush – total – to

- PHI – 190 – 126 – 316 – 1
- SEA – 195 – 172 – 367 – 3

==== Week 15: at Atlanta Falcons ====
Week 15: Seattle Seahawks (4–9) at Atlanta Falcons (8–4–1) – Game summary

Quarter	1	2	3	4	OT	Total
Seahawks	7	0	14	3	6	30
Falcons	14	3	0	7	0	24

at Georgia Dome, Atlanta

- Date: December 15
- Game time: 1:03pm local
- Game weather: indoors
- Game attendance: 69,551
- Referee: Ron Blum
- TV announcers (Fox): Kenny Albert, Tim Green, Buck Lanford
- Gamecenter, Gamebook

Game information

First quarter

- SEA – Shaun Alexander 3-yard run (Rian Lindell kick), 8:48 (SEA 7–0)
- ATL – Allen Rossum 91-yard kickoff return (Jay Feely kick), 8:35 (Tied 7–7)
- ATL – Alge Crumpler 20-yard pass from Michael Vick (Jay Feely kick), 0:13 (ATL 14–7)

Second quarter

- ATL – Jay Feely 22-yard field goal, 0:24 (ATL 17–7)

Third quarter

- SEA – Jerramy Stevens 5-yard pass from Matt Hasselbeck (Rian Lindell kick), 11:01 (ATL 17–14)
- SEA – Willie Williams 25-yard fumble return (Rian Lindell kick), 4:02 (SEA 21–17)

Fourth quarter

- SEA – Rian Lindell 43-yard field goal, 1:55 (SEA 24–17)
- ATL – Trevor Gaylor 12-yard pass from Michael Vick (Jay Feely kick), 0:17 (Tied 24–24)

Overtime

- SEA – Shaun Alexander 27-yard run, 4:24 (SEA 30–24)

Top passers

- SEA – Matt Hasselbeck: 22/31, 298 yds, 1 TD
- ATL – Michael Vick: 21/38, 240 yds, 2 TD, 2 INT

Top rushers

- SEA – Shaun Alexander: 28 car, 127 yds, 2 TD
- ATL – Warrick Dunn: 20 car, 101 yds

Top receivers

- SEA – Koren Robinson: 9 rec, 143 yds
- ATL – Alge Crumpler: 5 rec, 75 yds, 1 TD

Team – pass – rush – total – to

- SEA – 298 – 166 – 464 – 3
- ATL – 223 – 150 – 373 – 3

==== Week 16: vs. St. Louis Rams ====
Week 16: St. Louis Rams (6–8) at Seattle Seahawks (5–9) – Game summary

Quarter	1	2	3	4	Total
Rams	0	3	7	0	10
Seahawks	3	10	10	7	30

at Seahawks Stadium, Seattle

- Date: December 22
- Game time: 1:05pm local
- Game weather: cloudy, 45 °F (7 °C), 76% humidity, wind SE 5 miles per hour (8.0 km/h)
- Game attendance: 63,953
- Referee: Mike Carey
- TV announcers (Fox): Kenny Albert, Tim Green & Brent Ringenbach
- Gamecenter, Gamebook

Game information

First quarter

- SEA – Rian Lindell 31-yard field goal, 8:46 (SEA 3–0)

Second quarter

- SEA – Rian Lindell 36-yard field goal, 12:12 (SEA 6–0)
- STL – Jeff Wilkins 45-yard field goal, 5:43 (SEA 6–3)
- SEA – Shaun Alexander 1-yard run (Rian Lindell kick), 3:43 (SEA 13–3)
- SEA – Shaun Alexander 1-yard run (Rian Lindell kick), 8:58 (SEA 20–3)

Third quarter

- STL – Torry Holt 5-yard pass from Jamie Martin (Jeff Wilkins kick), 3:17 (SEA 20–10)
- SEA – Rian Lindell 22-yard field goal, 0:06 (SEA 23–10)

Fourth quarter

- SEA – Darrell Jackson 38-yard pass from Matt Hasselbeck (Rian Lindellc kick), 11:16 (SEA 30–10)

Top passers

- STL – Jamie Martin: 31/48, 259 yds, 1 TD, 3 INT
- SEA – Matt Hasselbeck: 20/32, 303 yds, 1 TD

Top rushers

- STL – Marshall Faulk: 9 car, 13 yds
- SEA – Shaun Alexander: 26 car, 79 yds, 2 TD

Top receivers

- STL – Torry Holt: 9 rec, 92 yds, 1 TD
- SEA – Koren Robinson: 4 rec, 94 yds

Team – pass – rush – total – to

- STL – 254 – 17 – 271 – 5
- SEA – 292 – 100 – 392 – 1

==== Week 17: at San Diego Chargers ====
Week 17: Seattle Seahawks (6–9) at San Diego Chargers (8–7) – Game summary

Quarter	1	2	3	4	OT	Total
Seahawks	7	0	0	21	3	31
Chargers	0	10	10	8	0	28

at Qualcomm Stadium, San Diego, California

- Date: December 29
- Game time: 1:15 p.m. PST
- Game weather: 61 °F (16 °C), relative humidity 87%, wind 8 mph
- Game attendance: 52,159
- Referee: Bill Leavy
- TV announcers (FOX): Ron Pitts, Marv Levy and Brent Ringenbach
- Box score, Game Book

Game information

First quarter

- SEA – Darrell Jackson 14-yard pass from Matt Hasselbeck (Ryan Lindell kick), 10:49. Seahawks 7–0. Drive: 8 plays, 79 yards, 4:11.

Second quarter

- SDG – Stephen Alexander 26-yard pass from Drew Brees (Steve Christie kick), 11:59. Tied 7–7. Drive: 9 plays, 79 yards, 3:42.
- SDG – Steve Christie 26-yard field goal, 8:21. Chargers 10–7. Drive: 6 plays, 41 yards, 2:27.

Third quarter

- SDG – Steve Christie 29-yard field goal, 12:06. Chargers 13–7. Drive: 7 plays, 57 yards, 2:54.
- SDG – Eric Parker 31-yard pass from Drew Brees (Steve Christie kick), 0:59. Chargers 20–7. Drive: 9 plays, 80 yards, 4:29.

Fourth quarter

- SEA – Shaun Alexander 2-yard run (Ryan Lindell kick), 13:59. Chargers 20–14. Drive: 5 plays, 63 yards, 2:00.
- SDG – Fred McCrary 1-yard pass from Drew Brees (Drew Brees–Reche Caldwell pass), 8:37. Chargers 28–14. Drive: 12 plays, 73 yards, 5:22.
- SEA – Koren Robinson 19-yard pass from Matt Hasselbeck (Ryan Lindell kick), 6:14. Chargers 28–21. Drive: 5 plays, 58 yards, 2:23.
- SEA – Matt Hasselbeck 1-yard run (Ryan Lindell kick), 0:01. Tied 28–28. Drive: 17 plays, 88 yards, 3:31.

Overtime

- SEA – Ryan Lindell 24-yard field goal, 5:02. Seahawks 31–28. Drive: 10 plays, 46 yards, 4:52.

Top passers

- SEA – Matt Hasselbeck – 36/53, 449 yards, 2 TD, 2 INT
- SDG – Drew Brees – 27/49, 332 yards, 3 TD, INT

Top rushers

- SEA – Shaun Alexander – 15 rushes, 67 yards, TD
- SDG – LaDainian Tomlinson – 17 rushes, 67 yards

Top receivers

- SEA – Itula Mili – 7 receptions, 119 yards
- SDG – Stephen Alexander – 8 receptions, 129 yards, TD

Team – pass – rush – total – to

- SEA – 449 – 163 – 591 – 3
- SDG – 352 – 88 – 414 – 1
