= Cedric Woodard =

American football player (born 1977)

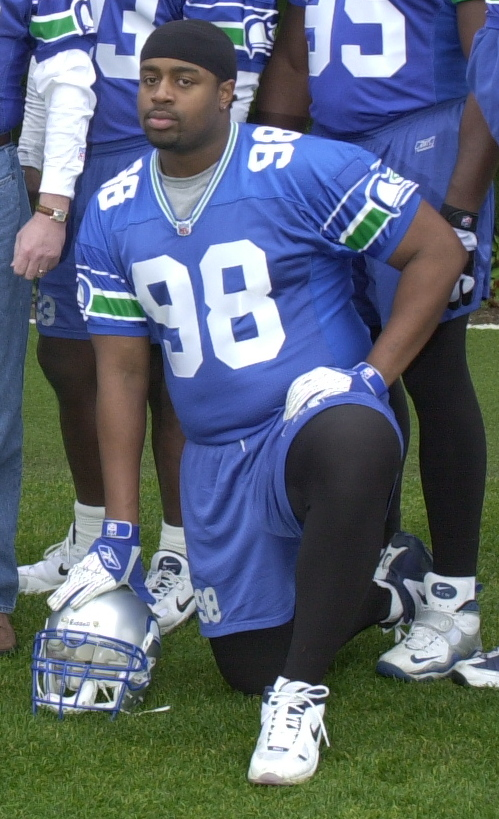
- Woodard with the Seattle Seahawks in 2002

No. 98
- Position: Defensive tackle

Personal information
- Born: September 5, 1977 (age 49); Bay City, Texas, U.S.
- Listed height: 6 ft 2 in (1.88 m)
- Listed weight: 310 lb (141 kg)

Career information
- High school: Sweeny (TX)
- College: Texas
- NFL draft: 2000: 6th round, 191st overall pick

Career history
- Baltimore Ravens (2000)*; Seattle Seahawks (2000–2004); New Orleans Saints (2005)
- * Offseason or practice squad member only

Career NFL statistics
- Tackles: 117
- Sacks: 1
- Stats at Pro Football Reference

Cedric Darnell Woodard (born September 5, 1977) is an American former professional football player who was a defensive tackle in the National Football League (NFL). He played college football for the Texas Longhorns and was selected by the Baltimore Ravens in the sixth round of the 2000 NFL draft.

Pre-draft measurables
| Height | Weight | Arm length | Hand span | 40-yard dash | 10-yard split | 20-yard split | Vertical jump | Broad jump | Bench press |
|---|---|---|---|---|---|---|---|---|---|
| 6 ft 2 1/2 in (1.89 m) | 290 lb (132 kg) | 34 3/4 in (0.88 m) | 10 in (0.25 m) | 5.23 s | 1.84 s | 3.04 s | 30.5 in (0.77 m) | 9 ft 1 in (2.77 m) | 23 reps |
All values from NFL Combine

Woodard's cousin, Quentin Jammer, played cornerback for the San Diego Chargers and the Denver Broncos.

== NFL career statistics ==
Legend
| **Bold** | Career high |

=== Regular season ===
| Year | Team | Games | | Tackles | | | | | Interceptions | | | | | Fumbles | | | |
| Year | Team | GP | GS | Cmb | Solo | Ast | Sck | TFL | Int | Yds | TD | Lng | PD | FF | FR | Yds | TD |
|---|---|---|---|---|---|---|---|---|---|---|---|---|---|---|---|---|---|
| 2001 | SEA | **16** | 0 | 10 | 9 | 1 | 0.0 | **3** | 0 | 0 | 0 | 0 | 0 | **1** | 0 | 0 | 0 |
| 2002 | SEA | 13 | 0 | 1 | 0 | 1 | 0.0 | 0 | 0 | 0 | 0 | 0 | 0 | 0 | 0 | 0 | 0 |
| 2003 | SEA | **16** | 13 | **57** | **41** | 16 | 0.0 | 2 | 0 | 0 | 0 | 0 | 0 | 0 | 0 | 0 | 0 |
| 2004 | SEA | **16** | **16** | 49 | 28 | **21** | **1.0** | **3** | 0 | 0 | 0 | 0 | 0 | **1** | **1** | 0 | 0 |
| | | 61 | 29 | 117 | 78 | 39 | 1.0 | 8 | 0 | 0 | 0 | 0 | 0 | 2 | 1 | 0 | 0 |

=== Playoffs ===
| Year | Team | Games | | Tackles | | | | | Interceptions | | | | | Fumbles | | | |
| Year | Team | GP | GS | Cmb | Solo | Ast | Sck | TFL | Int | Yds | TD | Lng | PD | FF | FR | Yds | TD |
|---|---|---|---|---|---|---|---|---|---|---|---|---|---|---|---|---|---|
| 2003 | SEA | **1** | **1** | **3** | **2** | **1** | 0.0 | 0 | 0 | 0 | 0 | 0 | **1** | 0 | 0 | 0 | 0 |
| 2004 | SEA | **1** | **1** | 1 | 1 | 0 | **0.5** | 0 | 0 | 0 | 0 | 0 | 0 | 0 | 0 | 0 | 0 |
| | | 2 | 2 | 4 | 3 | 1 | 0.5 | 0 | 0 | 0 | 0 | 0 | 1 | 0 | 0 | 0 | 0 |
