= Brian Webber =

American actor (born 1967)

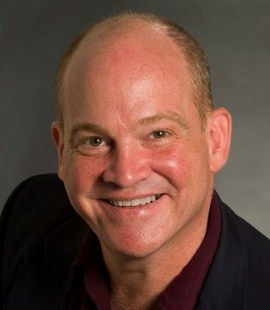
- Born: December 19, 1967 (age 58); Birmingham, Alabama
- Occupation: Actor

Brian Webber (born December 19, 1967) is an American actor from Birmingham, Alabama. He left a successful career in Sales and Sales Management in 2004 at the age of 35 to pursue a new career in acting with the film called “Alice's Misadventures in Wonderland” in which he played the role of Mr. Jones, director and writer of the film is Robert Rugan and the cast of the film includes: Maggie Henry, Cullen Carr, Will Keenan, Melba Sibrel, Kyle Holman, Chris Garrison, and Barry Austin. He also portrayed Judge Roy Moore in the original stage cast of Judge Roy Moore is Coming to Dinner. Brian Webber continues to do commercial acting work in Atlanta, Orlando and Nashville along with owning and operating Storyville Productions, Inc. and Storyville Station in Birmingham Alabama.
