= Ryan Hannam =

American football player (born 1980)

No. 83, 86
- Position: Tight end

Personal information
- Born: February 24, 1980 (age 46); St. Ansgar, Iowa, U.S.
- Listed height: 6 ft 2 in (1.88 m)
- Listed weight: 255 lb (116 kg)

Career information
- High school: St. Ansgar
- College: Northern Iowa
- NFL draft: 2002: 5th round, 169th overall pick

Career history
- Seattle Seahawks (2002–2005); Dallas Cowboys (2006)

Awards and highlights
- Second-team All-Gateway (2001)

Career NFL statistics
- Receptions: 22
- Receiving yards: 215
- Receiving touchdowns: 2
- Stats at Pro Football Reference

Ryan Hannam (born February 24, 1980) is an American former professional football player who was a tight end in the National Football League (NFL) for the Seattle Seahawks and Dallas Cowboys. He played college football for the Northern Iowa Panthers.

== Early life ==
Hannam attended St. Ansgar High School in St. Ansgar, Iowa, where he played football, baseball, track and basketball. In football he was a three-time All-district selection at defensive tackle and a 1st Team all-state kicker.

Hannam was inducted into the Iowa High School Football Hall of Fame in 2020.

== College career ==
Hannam accepted a football scholarship from the Division I-AA University of Northern Iowa. As a freshman, he recorded two receptions for 39 yards and one touchdown.

During his sophomore season, Hannam started four games and recorded 23 receptions (fifth on the team) for 253 yards and five touchdowns.

As a junior, Hannam recorded 18 receptions (fourth on the team) for 261 yards (14.5-yard avg.) and one touchdown.

As a senior, Hannam was elected as one of the team captains and helped lead the team to the semi-final round of the playoffs. He started fourteen games, recording 43 receptions (second on the team) for 404 yards and five tackles on special teams. Following the season, he was awarded the Stan Sheriff Award, named after the former UNI head football coach and athletic director, given to the player that is the most inspirational and who is a leader in helping the team run smoothly. He was a second team All-conference choice, first team All-academic pick, and was also selected as an honorable-mention All-American pick by the Football Gazette.

During his senior season, University of Northern Iowa head coach Mark Farley had this to say about Hannam: "He is, by far, the best tight end I've been around, whether it's here or anywhere else. I've made this statement many times: I believe he is the best football player on our team as far as running, blocking, catching and tackling. He's one of those guys who, to me, is maybe the best player in our league, as well."

Hannam finished his college career with 47 games played, including 28 starts, 86 receptions for 957 yards (11.1-yard avg.) and seven touchdowns, and is considered one of the best tight ends, and top all-round players, to have played football at the University of Northern Iowa.

== Professional career ==
=== Seattle Seahawks ===
Hannam was selected by the Seattle Seahawks in the 5th round (169th overall) of the 2002 NFL draft. As a rookie, he played primarily on special teams while also serving as the second or third tight end. His first career reception was a 16-yard touchdown against the Arizona Cardinals.

During the 2003 season, he suffered a serious injury to his right knee, tearing the anterior cruciate ligament and meniscus, during the fifth game against the Chicago Bears, ending his season. He was placed on the injured reserve list on October 29. Over the next few years, Hannam underwent multiple procedures on his right knee.

In 2004, he served as the second tight end, finishing with eight receptions for 110 yards, while also playing extensively on special teams.

In 2005, he started five games for the Seahawks. His efforts contributed to Shaun Alexander rushing for a league high 1,880 yards, setting the single season rushing touchdown record, and being named the NFL MVP. He played in Super Bowl XL in Detroit, recording two catches for 12 yards against the Pittsburgh Steelers. He finished the season with 13 receptions for 89 yards and one touchdown.

=== Dallas Cowboys ===
Following his impressive performance during the 2005 season, on March 18, 2006, Hannam signed a four-year contract with the Dallas Cowboys to take over the blocking tight end role that was previously handled by Dan Campbell. However, due to the degenerative condition in his right knee, he was only able to appear in two games that season before being placed on the injured reserve list on October 11. He was subsequently released by the Cowboys on March 1, 2007., and retired from the NFL.

Hannam finished his NFL career with 54 games played, 22 receptions for 215 yards, two touchdowns, one kickoff return, one punt return, and eight special teams tackles.

== Personal life ==
Hannam currently owns a financial services company in Cedar Falls, IA called Financial Designs, and is married to April Hannam with two daughters.
