= Shaun Alexander =

American football player (born 1977)

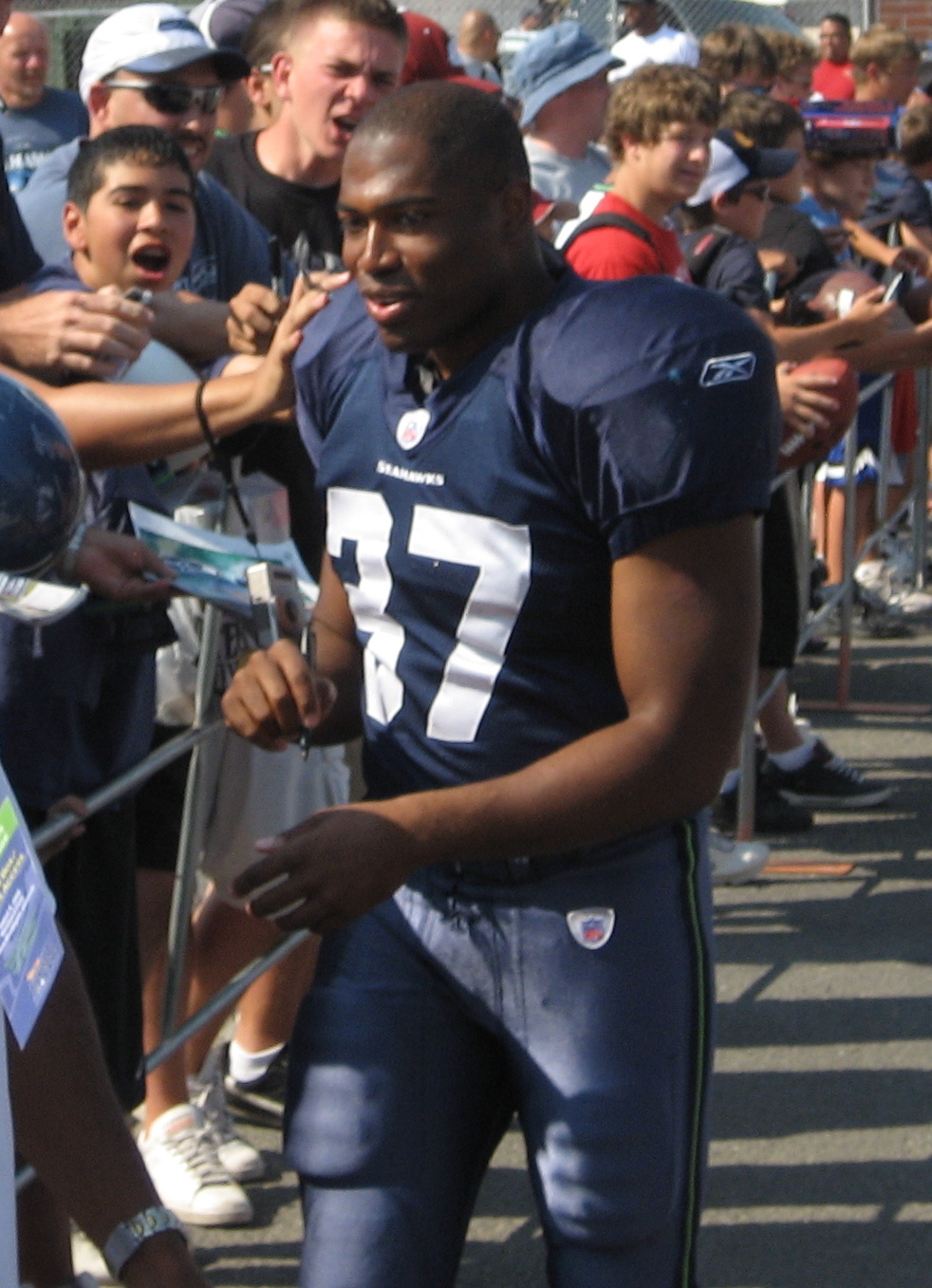
- Alexander with the Seattle Seahawks in 2006

No. 37
- Position: Running back

Personal information
- Born: August 30, 1977 (age 49); Florence, Kentucky, U.S.
- Listed height: 5 ft 11 in (1.80 m)
- Listed weight: 228 lb (103 kg)

Career information
- High school: Boone County (Florence)
- College: Alabama (1996–1999)
- NFL draft: 2000: 1st round, 19th overall pick

Career history
- Seattle Seahawks (2000–2007); Washington Redskins (2008)

Awards and highlights
- NFL Most Valuable Player (2005); NFL Offensive Player of the Year (2005); 2× First-team All-Pro (2004, 2005); 3× Pro Bowl (2003–2005); NFL rushing yards leader (2005); 2× NFL rushing touchdowns leader (2001, 2005); NFL scoring leader (2005); NFL 2000s All-Decade Team; Seattle Seahawks 35th Anniversary team; Seattle Seahawks Top 50 players; Seattle Seahawks Ring of Honor; First-team All-American (1999); NCAA rushing touchdowns co-leader (1999); NCAA scoring leader (1999); First-team All-SEC (1999); Second-team All-SEC (1998); SEC Player of the Year (1999)

Career NFL statistics
- Rushing yards: 9,453
- Rushing average: 4.3
- Rushing touchdowns: 100
- Receptions: 215
- Receiving yards: 1,520
- Receiving touchdowns: 12
- Stats at Pro Football Reference

Shaun Edward Alexander (born August 30, 1977) is an American former professional football running back who played in the National Football League (NFL) for the Seattle Seahawks and Washington Redskins. He played college football for the Alabama Crimson Tide, earning first-team All-American honors in 1999. He was selected by the Seahawks 19th overall in the 2000 NFL draft. In 2011, he was inducted into the Alabama Sports Hall of Fame.

Alexander set numerous NFL and Seahawks' franchise records and was named the NFL MVP in 2005. He was also named to the NFL's 2000 All-Decade team, and is tied in ranking ninth all time in NFL history for rushing touchdowns (100). Alexander was the first athlete featured on the cover of both the NCAA Football and Madden NFL series of video games.

== Early life ==
Alexander was born and raised in Florence, Kentucky. His father, Curtis Alexander Jr., works for Morton Salt and his mother Carol works in the truancy department of the Boone County School District. He has an older brother Durran, and four older half-sisters and three older half-brothers. His parents divorced when he was 11, and he and Durran were raised by their mother in a two-bedroom apartment off of Shenandoah Drive in Florence, Kentucky.

Alexander attended Florence Elementary School and Rector A. Jones Middle School. In 1991, he entered Boone County High School. As a freshman, he played football for the junior varsity team and was voted Class President—as he was every year in high school. As well as football, Alexander excelled in basketball, baseball, and track.

In his sophomore season, Alexander made the varsity team as the second-string running back. By mid-season, he was the team's featured running back as he rushed for 1,095 yards and 14 touchdowns. During his junior season in 1993, Alexander ran for 2,396 yards and 42 touchdowns as Boone County made it to the state semifinals. In a game versus Campbell County, Alexander rushed for seven touchdowns. He was listed in "Faces in the Crowd" section of Sports Illustrated in January 1994.

During his senior season, 1994–1995, Alexander rushed for 3,166 yards and a state record 54 touchdowns and was named Kentucky's "Mr. Football". He also was selected All-American by Parade and USA Today's 1994 All USA team, named "Old Spice Athlete of the Month" by Sports Illustrated, and was known as "Alexander the Great" and had his high school number 37 retired a few weeks before his graduation. In three varsity seasons, Alexander rushed for 6,657 yards and 110 touchdowns—both of which are Top 10 prep all-time records.

== College career ==
Alexander had narrowed his choices down to Michigan, Alabama, and Notre Dame (where his brother Durran played drums in the marching band). He ultimately chose the University of Alabama because of the warm weather and the overall students' enthusiasm.

In 1995, during his senior year in high school, Alexander accepted a scholarship from Gene Stallings, then-head coach for the Alabama Crimson Tide football team. Mike DuBose replaced Stallings in 1997. In his freshman season on campus, Alexander was redshirted.

In the 1996 season, as a redshirt freshman, Alexander rushed for a school-record 291 yards and four touchdowns in a 26–0 victory over rivals LSU at Tiger Stadium. He finished the year with 589 rushing yards and six touchdowns, and helped the team to a 10–3 record.

The 1997 season proved to be tough for both Alexander and the Crimson Tide, as Alexander finished with 415 rushing yards and three touchdowns, while the Tide limped to four victories.

The 1998 season turned out much better for both, as Alabama improved to 7–5, and Alexander had 18 touchdowns (14 rushing and four receiving) and attained 1,178 yards. He was rewarded with an All-Southeast Conference honors at the end of the season.

Following his junior season, Alexander decided to return for his senior season rather than leaving early for the NFL draft. After initially being given Heisman Trophy consideration to start the 1999 season, those hopes faded as the season progressed and he ended with a sprained ankle versus Tennessee. Alexander still led the NCAA in scoring 144 points and co-led in rushing touchdowns with 19. He played a key role in leading the Tide to the 1999 SEC Championship Game, as Alabama trampled #3 Florida with a 34–7 victory. In the fourth quarter of the 1999 Iron Bowl versus rivals Auburn, Alexander led a comeback and scored three rushing touchdowns in the 28–17 victory, finishing the game with 199 total yards. He left the school holding 15 records, including 3,565 career rushing yards. He finished the 1999 season with 302 carries for 1,383 yards and 19 touchdowns to go with 25 receptions for 323 yards and four receiving touchdowns as the Crimson Tide improved to 10–3. He finished seventh in Heisman Trophy voting.

== Professional career ==
Pre-draft measurables
Height	Weight	40-yard dash
5 ft 11 7/8 in (1.83 m)	218 lb (99 kg)	4.58 s
All values from NFL Combine

=== Seattle Seahawks ===
==== 2000–2004 ====
Alexander was selected by the Seattle Seahawks on April 15 in the 2000 NFL draft in the first round as the 19th overall pick. The Seahawks acquired the pick in the draft following a trade that sent wide receiver Joey Galloway to the Dallas Cowboys. In his rookie season, Alexander saw limited action behind starter Ricky Watters, rushing 64 times for just 313 yards and two touchdowns.

In Alexander's second season in the NFL, he became the Seahawks' featured running back, following injuries and the eventual retirement of Watters. Alexander rushed 309 times for 1,318 yards and 14 touchdowns, only behind Marshall Faulk for total touchdowns. The offensive line was led by All-Pro left tackle Walter Jones and rookie left guard Steve Hutchinson. In Week 4, he had 31 carries for 176 yards and two touchdowns in the 24–15 over the Jacksonville Jaguars. He was named AFC Offensive Player of the Week for Week 4. In the following game, he had 33 carries for 142 yards and two touchdowns in the 34–21 win over the Denver Broncos. On ESPN Sunday Night Football on November 11, 2001, versus AFC West rival Oakland Raiders at Husky Stadium in Seattle, Alexander rushed for a franchise-record 266 yards on 35 carries, including an 88-yard run to the endzone. He was named the NFC Offensive Player of the Week after his performance against the Raiders. In Week 17, he had 20 carries for 127 yards and a touchdown in the 21–18 win over the Kansas City Chiefs. Following the season, Fox Sports Net hired him to do a variety show called Shaun Alexander Live, aimed to poke fun at Alexander's lack of recognition despite his on-field accomplishments, but it was short-lived.

In 2002, Alexander started all 16 games en route to an NFC leading (and franchise record) 16 rushing touchdowns, four of which came in the first half of Seattle's September 29, 2002, game against the Minnesota Vikings in only the second regular-season game ever at Seahawks Stadium in Seattle. He caught an 80-yard touchdown pass in the first half. In Week 12, against the Kansas City Chiefs, he had 23 carries for 145 yards and two touchdowns in the 39–32 win. In Week 15, in a 30–24 overtime win over the Atlanta Falcons, he had 28 carries for 127 yards and two touchdowns. He finished with 295 carries for 1,175 yards and the 16 rushing touchdowns to go with 59 receptions for 460 yards and two touchdowns. He had six games with multiple touchdowns and seven games over 100 scrimmage yards. The five touchdowns in that half set an NFL record. This was another ESPN Sunday Night Football game, enhancing Alexander's reputation for performing phenomenally well in high-profile, prime time nationally televised games. He was named NFC Offensive Player of the Week for Week 4.

The 2003 season marked another productive year for Alexander. In Week 16, against the Arizona Cardinals, he had 21 carries for 135 yards and two touchdowns in the 28–10 victory. He had seven games on the season rushing for at least 100 yards and scored a touchdown in 13 of the 16 games. He rushed his way to a career-high of 1,435 rushing yards and scored 16 touchdowns. Seattle also made its first playoff appearance since 2000. Against the Green Bay Packers in the wild card game, Alexander had only 45 yards on 20 carries, but had three rushing touchdowns. Alexander's success in the 2003 season earned him his first trip to Honolulu for the annual Pro Bowl.

In 2004, Alexander remained one of the key components of Seattle's offense. He started the season with 28 carries for 135 yards and two rushing touchdowns to go with a receiving touchdown in a 21–7 win over the New Orleans Saints. In Week 4, a 34–0 win over the San Francisco 49ers, he had two rushing touchdowns and a receiving touchdown. IN Week 5, he had 23 carries for 150 yards and a touchdown in the 33–27 overtime loss to the St. Louis Rams. In Week 8, against the Carolina Panthers, he had 32 carries for 195 yards and a rushing touchdown to go with a receiving touchdown in the 23–17 win. In the following game, he had 26 carries for 160 yards and two touchdowns in the 42–27 road win over the San Francisco 49ers. In the following game he had 22 carries for 176 yards in the 23–12 loss to the St. Louis Rams. In Week 16, he had 30 carries for 154 yards and three touchdowns in a 24–21 win over the Arizona Cardinals. He was named NFC Offensive Player of the Week for Week 16. He finished second in the NFL in rushing yards with 1,696, one yard shy of New York Jets running back Curtis Martin. After being passed over for a late-game rushing attempt during his team's victory over the Atlanta Falcons, Alexander accused his coach Mike Holmgren of "stabbing him in the back" by denying him an opportunity to win the rushing title. Alexander retracted his comments the following day and expressed support for his coach. He earned another Pro Bowl nomination.

==== 2005 season ====
Alexander had a great deal of success in the 2005 season. In Week 2, against the Atlanta Falcons, he had 28 carries for 144 yards and one touchdown in the 21–18 win. In Week 3, he had 22 carries for 140 yards and four rushing touchdowns in a 37–12 win over the Arizona Cardinals to earn NFC Offensive Player of the Week. In Week 5, he had 25 carries for 119 yards and two touchdowns in a 37–31 win over the St. Louis Rams. In Week 6, he had 22 carries for 141 yards and four touchdowns in a 42–10 win over the Houston Texans to earn his second NFC Offensive Player of the Week honor of the season.

In Week 9, Alexander had 23 carries for 173 yards and two touchdowns in a 33–19 win over the Arizona Cardinals to earn a third NFC Offensive Player of the Week honor for the season. In Week 10, scoring three touchdowns to go with 33 carries for 165 yards against the St. Louis Rams, Alexander became the first running back in NFL history to record 15 or more touchdowns in five consecutive seasons. On November 20, 2005, in San Francisco in Week 11, Alexander became the first player in NFL history to score 19 rushing or receiving touchdowns in only 10 games (Steve Van Buren had 18 in 1945).

On December 11, 2005, in Seattle's NFC West-clinching victory over the San Francisco 49ers, Alexander had his ninth 100–yard rushing game of the year, breaking Chris Warren's franchise record of eight 100–yard games. In the process he also set a more significant NFL record, running for 100 yards against divisional opponents in nine straight games, a record previously held by Walter Payton. On December 18, 2005, in a game against the Tennessee Titans, Alexander had 26 carries for 172 yards and a touchdown and passed the 1,600-yard mark for the second consecutive season, had a Seahawks franchise record 10th 100-yard rushing game, and scored his 24th rushing touchdown of the year (as well as the 86th of his career, tying him with Priest Holmes at 12th on the all-time rushing touchdown leader list). Perhaps more substantial is that his 96th career touchdown moved him into an 18th place tie with Randy Moss and Eric Dickerson on the all-time touchdown leader list, having already bumped Priest Holmes (94 TDs) into 21st. Alexander also became the first Seahawks player to appear on the cover of Sports Illustrated. In Week 16, he had 21 carries for 139 yards and two touchdowns in the 28–13 win over the Indianapolis Colts.

On January 1, 2006, in a Week 17 game against the Green Bay Packers, Alexander set the single-season touchdown record at 28, and tied Priest Holmes's record of 27 rushing touchdowns in a season.. Alexander also won his first NFL rushing title with 1,880 rushing yards, while leading the NFC for the second consecutive year. In 2005, he joined Emmitt Smith, Priest Holmes, and Marshall Faulk as the only running backs to record consecutive seasons of 20 or more touchdowns. Alexander broke the franchise record for the most rushing yards in the Seattle Seahawks' history. Combined with quarterback Matt Hasselbeck, Alexander aided the Seahawks in producing the league's top ranked offense, and the team scoring title. In a Pro Bowl-season, he led the NFL in rushing yards, rushing touchdowns, and points.

On January 5, he was awarded the 2005 NFL MVP Award, becoming the first Seahawk to win the MVP award. He beat out New York Giants running back Tiki Barber and Indianapolis Colts quarterback Peyton Manning who had won the award the previous two years. Alexander garnered 19 out of a possible 50 votes. A day after receiving the MVP award, Alexander was named Associated Press Offensive Player of the Year. He received 34 votes of a panel of 50 NFL sportswriters and broadcasters. He was also named the FedEx Ground NFL Player of the Year. At the ESPY Awards Alexander received two awards, Best Record Breaking Performance and Best NFL Player.

In the divisional round against the Washington Redskins, Alexander suffered a concussion early on and had to watch the Seahawks win. However, in the NFC Championship Game against the Carolina Panthers he had 34 carries for 132 yards and two touchdowns, which was easily the best playoff performance of his career.

The Seahawks lost to the Pittsburgh Steelers in Super Bowl XL on February 5, 2006. Alexander was, however, the leading rusher of the game with 95 yards. At the end of the season, he was selected to be the cover athlete of Madden NFL 2007. Alexander was the first player to be featured on both the covers of Madden NFL and NCAA Football (the latter on 2001). He was also the only one with this accomplishment up until Larry Fitzgerald was selected to appear on Madden NFL 10, though Fitzgerald was sharing a cover with the Steelers' Troy Polamalu.

Alexander's MVP season was celebrated musically by Dustin Blatnik and the 12th Man Band in the song "Sweet Shaun Alexander", a parody of Lynyrd Skynyrd's "Sweet Home Alabama". "Sweet Shaun" was widely aired in the Seattle area in the weeks leading up to Super Bowl XL, plus national play on ESPN Radio and other outlets. The song was decried in Sports Illustrated magazine, calling this parody "the sacrilege with cheese".

==== 2006 season ====
In March 2006, Alexander signed an eight-year, $62 million contract ($15.1 million of which was guaranteed and $15 million to be paid in the first year of the contract) to remain with the Seattle Seahawks organization, becoming the highest paid running back in NFL history at the time. However, the Seahawks All-Pro offensive guard Steve Hutchinson left to go to the Minnesota Vikings several weeks later in free agency, weakening an offensive line that had been a large part of Alexander's 2005 productivity.

Alexander broke his left foot in Week 3 of the season, effectively continuing the Madden Curse. However, in the same game, Alexander set a team record while scoring his 102nd touchdown of his career, breaking Steve Largent's record. He returned to action on November 19 against the San Francisco 49ers, rushing 17 times for 37 yards. In a November 27 game on ESPN's Monday Night Football against the Packers, Alexander carried the ball a team record 40 times for 201 yards in a game that featured snow for the first time at Qwest Field. Alexander's performance was a return to MVP form and yet another prime-time showcase for Alexander, who was still playing with the broken foot. In a December 10 loss to the Arizona Cardinals, Alexander broke Barry Sanders' record for most consecutive games with a run of 10 or more yards.

Alexander finished the 2006 season with 252 rushing attempts for 896 yards and seven touchdowns in ten games. In the Divisional Round against the Chicago Bears, Alexander had 26 carries for 108 yards and two touchdowns in the 27–24 overtime loss.

==== 2007 season ====
During the Week 1 game against Tampa Bay, Alexander sustained a fractured left wrist. He indicated that the injury was not major and that he would continue to play, but his performance took a noticeable turn for the worse. He rushed 27 times for 105 yards and 21 times for 100 yards in the victories in Weeks 1 and 3. During Week 5, Alexander's lead blocker, Mack Strong, was injured with a herniated disk in his neck, forcing him to retire; he was replaced by Leonard Weaver. This left Alexander even more exposed and as a result, injuries continued to plague him. In Week 9, he sprained both his knee and ankle. Even so, in the final game of the regular season, Alexander was able to become the eighth player in NFL history to score 100 rushing touchdowns.

Alexander's final regular season statistics for the 2007 season were 716 yards rushing on 207 attempts, a 3.5–yard per carry with four touchdowns in 10 games. He added 14 receptions for 76 yards and a touchdown to his rushing totals. After a January 12, 2008, playoff loss in the Divisional Round to the Green Bay Packers in which Alexander recorded only 20 yards on 9 carries and scored one touchdown, the Seahawks opted to cut Alexander from the team on April 22, 2008.

=== Washington Redskins ===
After his release, Alexander visited several teams including the Cincinnati Bengals, Detroit Lions, and New Orleans Saints, but was not able to come to terms on a contract until he visited the Washington Redskins. On October 14, 2008, the team signed Alexander to fill the void left when back-up running back Ladell Betts went down with a knee injury. However, the Redskins released Alexander on November 25, 2008, after he logged only 11 carries in four games and averaged 2.2 yards per carry.

== Career statistics ==
Legend
	AP NFL MVP & OPOTY
	Led the league
**Bold**	Career high

=== NFL ===
Year	Team	Games		Rushing					Receiving					Fumbles	
Year	Team	GP	GS	Att	Yds	Avg	Lng	TD	Rec	Yds	Avg	Lng	TD	Fum	Lost
2000	SEA	16	1	64	313	4.9	50	2	5	41	8.2	18	0	2	2
2001	SEA	16	12	309	1,318	4.3	**88**	14	44	343	7.8	28	2	4	**4**
2002	SEA	16	16	295	1,175	4.0	58	16	**59**	**460**	7.8	**80**	2	3	1
2003	SEA	16	15	326	1,435	4.4	55	14	42	295	7.0	22	2	4	3
2004	SEA	16	16	353	1,696	4.8	44	16	23	170	7.4	24	**4**	5	3
2005	SEA	16	16	**370**	**1,880**	**5.1**	**88**	**27**	15	78	5.2	9	1	5	1
2006	SEA	10	10	252	896	3.6	33	7	12	48	4.0	14	0	**6**	3
2007	SEA	13	10	207	716	3.5	25	4	14	76	5.4	18	1	2	0
2008	WAS	4	0	11	24	2.2	8	0	1	9	**9.0**	9	0	0	0
Career		123	96	2,187	9,453	4.3	88	100	215	1,520	7.1	80	12	31	17

=== College ===
Legend
Co-led the NCAA

Season	Team	GP	Rushing						Receiving					
Season	Team	GP	Att	Yds	Avg	Lng	TD	Y/G	Rec	Yds	Avg	Lng	TD	Y/G
1996	Alabama	11	77	589	**7.6**	**73**	6	53.5	7	53	7.6	28	0	4.8
1997	Alabama	9	90	415	4.6	27	3	46.1	4	37	9.3	22	0	4.1
1998	Alabama	10	232	1,046	4.5	37	12	104.6	**25**	**379**	**15.2**	43	**4**	**37.9**
1999	Alabama	11	**302**	**1,383**	4.6	38	**19**	**125.7**	**25**	323	12.9	**51**	**4**	29.4
Career		41	701	3,433	4.9	73	40	83.7	61	792	13.0	51	8	19.3

== Legacy ==
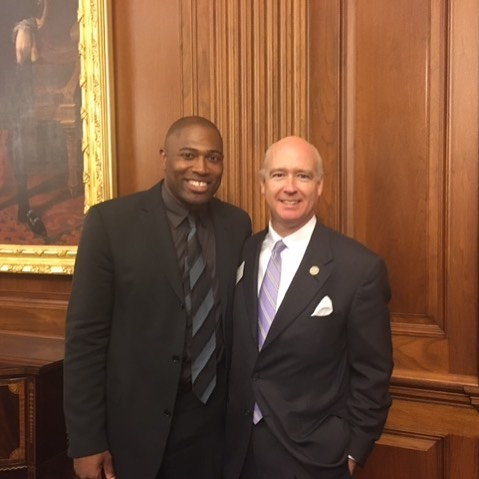
Alexander with U.S. Representative Robert Aderholt in 2017

When he retired, Alexander was 14th among the 20 players with 100 career touchdowns and one of eight to do so with 100 rushing touchdowns. When he retired, he was one of only eleven players to record 100 touchdowns in their first ten seasons and one of just three to record 100 touchdowns in a career of 10 seasons or less.

However, he has not been inducted into the Pro Football Hall of Fame, where he has not even been selected as a semifinalist since being first eligible in 2014. Two of the teammates who blocked for him on the offensive line, Walter Jones and Steve Hutchinson, are inductees.

In 2016, Alexander was inducted into The Kentucky Athletic Hall of Fame.

The Shaun Alexander Freshman of the Year Award, presented annually by the Maxwell Football Club since 2018, honors the most outstanding freshman player in college football for exceptional on-field performance, leadership, and character and the award was named after the NFL MVP Shaun Alexander.

== Personal life ==
Alexander married Valerie Alexander (née Boyd) in April 2002 after a two-year courtship. Together, the couple has 12 living children. The couple had another child who died unexpectedly at two months of age. Alexander's older brother, Durran, serves as executive director of the Shaun Alexander Foundation.

Shaun and Valerie Alexander announced on September 25, 2025, that they are expecting their 14th child.

== See also ==
- List of NCAA major college football yearly scoring leaders
