= Terreal Bierria =

American football player (born 1980)

No. 34
- Position: Safety

Personal information
- Born: October 10, 1980 (age 46); Slidell, Louisiana, U.S.
- Listed height: 6 ft 3 in (1.91 m)
- Listed weight: 211 lb (96 kg)

Career information
- High school: Salmen (Slidell)
- College: Georgia
- NFL draft: 2002: 4th round, 120th overall pick

Career history
- Seattle Seahawks (2002–2004)

Career NFL statistics
- Tackles: 91
- Passes defended: 5
- INT: 1
- Stats at Pro Football Reference

Terreal Bierria (born October 10, 1980) is an American former professional football player who was a safety in the National Football League (NFL). He played college football for the Georgia Bulldogs and was selected in the fourth round of the 2002 NFL draft. He played two seasons for the Seattle Seahawks in 2002 and 2004, starting twelve games in 2004 for a defense that ranked 23rd in the NFL against the pass. He was cut after he left training camp to help families members trapped by Hurricane Katrina. He was arrested and charged with first-degree murder of a man in Slidell, Louisiana, but, after two trials, was never convicted.
