= Chris Terry (American football) =

American football player (born 1975)

No. 70, 72, 60
- Position: Offensive tackle

Personal information
- Born: August 8, 1975 (age 51); Jacksonville, Florida, U.S.
- Listed height: 6 ft 5 in (1.96 m)
- Listed weight: 295 lb (134 kg)

Career information
- College: Georgia
- NFL draft: 1999: 2nd round, 34th overall pick

Career history
- Carolina Panthers (1999–2002); Seattle Seahawks (2002–2004); Kansas City Chiefs (2006–2007)

Awards and highlights
- NFL All-Rookie Team (1999)

Career NFL statistics
- Games Played: 100
- Games Started: 88
- Stats at Pro Football Reference

Christopher Alexander Terry (born August 8, 1975) is an American former professional football player who was an offensive tackle in the National Football League. Terry was selected by the Carolina Panthers in 1999, released in 2002 and played three seasons with the Seattle Seahawks.

On October 26, 2006, the Kansas City Chiefs signed Terry to a two-year contract and played with Kansas City until week 15 of the 2007 season.

On January 27, 2010, Terry was booked into jail in Clark County, Indiana on charges of class A felony dealing cocaine and class C felony possession of cocaine along with charges of operating while intoxicated by refusal, resisting law enforcement, possession of a handgun without a permit and driving with a suspended license.
