= List of Seattle Seahawks broadcasters =

As of 2013, the Seattle Seahawks' flagship stations are 710 KIRO-AM and 97.3 KIRO-FM. 710 AM is the only AM radio station the team has ever been affiliated with, although it has been simulcast on various FM radio stations co-owned with KIRO. The current announcers are former Seahawks receiver Steve Raible (who was the team's color commentator from 1982–2003) and former Seahawks linebacker Dave Wyman. Games are heard on 65 stations in five states and Canada.

Preseason games not shown on national networks are televised by Seattle's local Fox affiliate, KCPQ-TV channel 13. Curt Menefee is the current preseason voice of the Seahawks, while Brock Huard provides color commentary on preseason telecasts.

== Past ==
Past announcers include: Pete Gross, who called games from 1976 until just days before his death from cancer in 1992, is a member of the team's Ring of Honor, Steve Thomas (Radio: 1992–1997), Lee Hamilton also known as "Hacksaw" (Radio: 1998–1999), Brian Davis (Radio: 2000–2003), and Warren Moon (2004–2017).

=== Radio broadcasters ===
Years	Flagship station	Play-by-play	Color commentator
1976	KIRO	Pete Gross	Don Heinrich and Wayne Cody
1977–1981	KIRO	Pete Gross	Don Heinrich
1982–1992	KIRO	Pete Gross	Steve Raible
1992–1997	KIRO	Steve Thomas	Steve Raible
1998–1999	KIRO	Lee Hamilton	Steve Raible
2000–2003	KIRO	Brian Davis	Steve Raible
2004–2017	KIRO	Steve Raible	Warren Moon
2018–present	KIRO	Steve Raible	Dave Wyman
