= KFIO =

KFIO may refer to:

- KFIO-FM, a radio station (106.5 FM) licensed to serve Dishman, Washington, United States
- KFIO (AM), a radio station (1050 AM) licensed to serve Dishman, Washington, United States which held this call sign from 2016 to 2025
- KSBN (AM), a radio station (1230 AM) licensed to serve Spokane, Washington, United States which held this call sign from 1923 to 1950
