= KSPO =

KSPO may refer to:

- KSPO (AM), a radio station (1050 AM) licensed to serve Dishman, Washington, United States
- KFIO-FM, a radio station (106.5 FM) licensed to serve Dishman, Washington, United States which held the KSPO call sign from 1996 to 2025
- KSPO Korea Sports Promotion Foundation, an organization in Seoul, South Korea
- KSPO Dome, the Olympic Gymnastics Arena in Seoul, South Korea
