= State of Washington Sports Hall of Fame =

- Established: 1960s, Tacoma Athletic Commission
- Location: Tacoma, Washington
- Coordinates: 47.236°N 122.4295°W
- Type: Hall of Fame
- Founder: Clay Huntington
- Executive director: Marc Blau
- Website: https://washingtonsportshof.org/

The State of Washington Sports Hall of Fame is a sports hall of fame honoring athletes associated with the U.S. state of Washington. There have been 235 individuals inducted into the hall since 1960.

== Inductees ==
Candidates for the State of Washington Sports Hall of Fame are nominated and voted on annually. Not every year has a class of inductees, years that do not have inductees include: 1971, 1972, 1973, 1975, 1976, 1981, 1982, 1984, 1985, 1987, 1988, 1990, 1991, 1992, 1993, 1995, 2000, 2002, 2016.

For the 2019 class, Dan Fitzgerald, Bernie Fryer, Ken Griffey Jr., Jason Hanson, Megan Jendrick, Steve Raible, Rick Rizzs, and Sugar Ray Seales were named into the hall of fame.

The Class of 2020 inductees included Aaron Sele, Adam Morrison, Brad Walker, Dick Cartmell, Don Zech, and Joe Kearney.

Inductees to the State of Washington Sports Hall of Fame include the following:

=== 1960s ===
Name	Category (role)	Birthplace	Washington Affiliation(s)	Inducted
Raymond "Nig" Borleske	Football (coach), Basketball (coach), Baseball (coach)	Albert Lea, Minnesota	Whitman College	1960
Hiram Conibear	Rowing (coach)	Mineral, Illinois	University of Washington	1960
Gretchen Kunigk Fraser	Skiing (alpine skier)	Tacoma, Washington	Stadium High School, College of Puget Sound	1960
Helene Madison	Swimming (sprint freestyle, distance freestyle)	Madison, Wisconsin	Washington Athletic Club	1960
George Wilson	Football (halfback)	Everett, Washington	University of Washington	1960
Herman Brix	Track and Field (shot put)	Tacoma, Washington	Stadium High School, University of Washington	1961
Gil Dobie	Football (coach)	Hastings, Minnesota	University of Washington	1961
Mel Hein	Football (center)	Redding, California	Washington State University	1961
Freddie Steele	Boxing (middleweight)	Seattle, Washington	Seattle, Tacoma	1961
Elgin Baylor	Basketball (small forward)	Washington, D.C., United States of America	Seattle University	1962
Orin E. "Babe" Hollingbery	Football (coach)	Hollister, California	Washington State University	1962
Fred Hutchinson	Baseball (pitcher)	Seattle, Washington	Seattle	1962
Jack Medica	Swimming (distance freestyle)	Seattle, Washington	Washington Athletic Club, University of Washington	1962
Vean Gregg	Baseball (pitcher)	Chehalis, Washington	Pacific Coast League, Aberdeen	1963
Ray Flaherty	Football (end)	Lamont, Washington	Gonzaga Preparatory School, Gonzaga University	1963
Hugh McElhenny	Football (halfback)	Los Angeles, California	University of Washington	1963
Al Ulbrickson	Rowing (coach)	Seattle, Washington	University of Washington	1963
Marvin "Bud" Ward	Golf	Elma, Washington	Olympia, Olympia High School, Olympia Country & Golf Club, Spokane Country Club	1963
Earl Averill	Baseball (batter)	Snohomish, Washington	Snohomish	1964
Russell "Rusty" Callow	Rowing (coach)	Kamilche, Washington	University of Washington	1964
Bob Johnson	Baseball (batter)	Pryor, Oklahoma	Tacoma	1964
Butch Meeker	Football	Spokane, Washington	Washington State University	1964
Arnold Riegger	Trapshooting (marksman)	Bothell, Washington		1964
Chuck Carroll	Football	Seattle, Washington	University of Washington	1965
Al Hostak	Boxing (middleweight)	Minneapolis, Minnesota		1965
Jack Nichols	Basketball	Palm Springs, California		1965
Arthur Buckner "Buck" Bailey	Baseball (coach)	San Saba, Texas	Washington State University	1966
Clarence "Hec" Edmundson	Basketball (coach), Track and Field (coach)	Moscow, Idaho	University of Washington	1966
Olav Ulland	Skiing (ski jumper)	Kongsberg, Norway		1966
Morris "Red" Badgro	Football (end)	Orillia, Washington		1967
Basil James	Horse racing (jockey)	Loveland, Colorado	Longacres	1967
Eddie O'Brien	Basketball	South Amboy, New Jersey	Seattle University	1967
Johnny O'Brien	Basketball	South Amboy, New Jersey	Seattle University	1967
Gale Bishop	Basketball	Sumas, Washington		1968
Royal Brougham	Sportswriter	St. Louis, Missouri	Seattle Post-Intelligencer	1968
Glenn "Turk" Edwards	Football (tackle)	Mold, Washington		1968
John Heinrick	Football (coach), Basketball (coach), Baseball (|coach)	Tacoma, Washington	University of Puget Sound	1969
Bob Houbregs	Basketball	Vancouver, Canada	University of Washington	1969
Harland Svare	Football (linebacker)	Clarkfield, Minnesota	Kitsap County	1969
Earl Torgeson	Baseball	Snohomish, Washington	Pacific Coast League	1969

=== 1970s ===
Name	Category (role)	Birthplace	Washington Affiliation(s)	Inducted
Harry Deegan	Horse racing (administrator)			1970
Harry Givan	Golf	Sequim, Washington		1970
Jimmy Phelan	Football (coach)	Sacramento, California	University of Washington	1970
Arnie Weinmeister	Football (defensive tackle)	Rhein, Canada	University of Washington	1970
George Burns	Baseball (outfielder)	Utica, New York		1974
Tony Canadeo	Football (halfback)	Chicago, Illinois	Gonzaga University	1974
Jeff Heath	Baseball (batter)	Fort William, Canada	Garfield High School, Northwest League	1974
Don Heinrich	Football (quarterback)	Chicago, Illinois	Bremerton High School, University of Washington	1974
Leo Lassen	Sportswriter, Broadcaster	Marathon County, Wisconsin	Seattle Rainiers	1974
Hal Lee	Basketball (point guard)	Thief River Falls, Minnesota	University of Washington	1974
Sam Baker	Football	San Francisco, California	Stadium High School	1977
Harlond Clift	Baseball	El Reno, Oklahoma		1977
Joe Gottstein	Horse racing (administrator)	Seattle, Washington		1977
Vic Markov	Football (tackle)	Chicago, Illinois	University of Washington	1977
Vince O'Keefe	Sportswriter		The Seattle Times, Seattle Post-Intelligencer	1977
Gerry Staley	Baseball (pitcher)	Brush Prairie, Washington		1977
Ernie Steele	Football (running back)	Bothell, Washington	University of Washington	1977
Chuck Congdon	Golf	Blaine, Washington	Tacoma Country and Golf Club	1978
Jack Friel	Basketball (coach)	Waterville, Washington	Washington State University	1978
Roy Johnson	Baseball (outfielder)	Pryor, Oklahoma	Tacoma	1978
Bill Nollan	Basketball (coach)		Washington State University	1978
Don Paul	Football (defensive back)	Tacoma, Washington	Washington State University	1978
George "Rube" Walberg	Baseball	Pine City, Minnesota		1978
Gene Conley	Basketball, Baseball (pitcher)	Muskogee, Oklahoma	Richland High School, Washington State University	1979
Jack Fournier	Baseball	Au Sable, Michigan		1979
Bobby Galer	Basketball	Seattle, Washington	University of Washington	1979
Gerry Lindgren	Track and Field (long-distance running)	Spokane, Washington	Washington State University	1979
Bill Schumacher	Hydroplane racing (hydroplane driver)			1979
Ray Washburn	Baseball (pitcher)	Pasco, Washington		1979

=== 1980s ===
Name	Category (role)	Birthplace	Washington Affiliation(s)	Inducted
Keith Lincoln	Football (running back)	Reading, Michigan	Washington State University	1980
Brian Sternberg	Track and Field (pole vault)		University of Washington	1980
Joyner "Jo Jo" White	Baseball (outfielder)	Red Oak, Georgia	Seattle Rainiers	1980
Sammy White	Baseball (catcher)	Kinsley, England	Lincoln High School, University of Washington	1980
Chuck Allen	Football (linebacker, administrator)	Cle Elum, Washington	University of Washington, Seattle Seahawks	1983
Enoch Bagshaw	Football (coach)	Flint, Wales	Everett High School, University of Washington	1983
Ed Goddard	Football (quarterback, halfback)	San Diego, California	Washington State University	1983
Kaye Hall Greff	Swimming (backstroke)	Tacoma, Washington	Woodrow Wilson High School	1983
Earl Johnson	Baseball (pitcher)	Redmond, Washington	Seattle	1983
Bill Morris	Basketball	Snohomish, Washington	University of Washington	1983
George Reed	Football	Vicksburg, Mississippi	Washington State University	1983
Ron Santo	Baseball (batter)	Seattle, Washington	Sick's Stadium	1983
Jack Westland	Golf	Everett, Washington	Everett	1983
Fred "Doc" Bohler	Basketball, Track and Field (coach)	Reading, Pennsylvania	Washington State University	1986
Frank Foyston	Ice hockey (center)			1986
Bill Muncey	Hydroplane racing (hydroplane driver)	Detroit, Michigan		1986
Amos Rusie	Baseball (pitcher)	Mooresville, Indiana		1986
Paul Schwegler	Football (tackle)	Chicago, Illinois	University of Washington	1986
Ed Brandt	Baseball (pitcher)	Spokane, Washington		1989
Gail Cogdill	Football (wide receiver)	Worland, Wyoming	Washington State University	1989
Woody Jensen	Baseball (outfielder)	Bremerton, Washington		1989
Jim Owens	Football (coach)	Oklahoma City, Oklahoma	University of Washington	1989
Mel Stottlemyre	Baseball (pitcher)	Hazleton, Missouri		1989
Torchy Torrence	Baseball (administrator)		University of Washington, Pacific Coast League	1989
Milt Woodard	Sportswriter	Tacoma, Washington	College of Puget Sound, Tacoma News Tribune	1989

=== 1990s ===
Name	Category (role)	Birthplace	Washington Affiliation(s)	Inducted
Earl Anthony	Bowling	Tacoma, Washington	Tacoma	1994
Hugh Campbell	Football (wide receiver, coach)	Saratoga, California	Washington State University	1994
Ron Cey	Baseball	Tacoma, Washington	Mount Tahoma High School, Washington State University	1994
Ray Frankowski	Football (guard)	Chicago, Illinois	University of Washington	1994
Joanne Gunderson-Carner	Golf	Kirkland, Washington		1994
Dick Hannula	Swimming (coach)		Woodrow Wilson High School	1994
Marv Harshman	Basketball (coach)	Eau Claire, Wisconsin	Pacific Lutheran University, Washington State University, University of Washington	1994
Paul Lindeman	Basketball	Bartlesville, Oklahoma		1994
John McCallum	Sportswriter	Tacoma, Washington		1994
Gordon Pfeifer	Handball		University of Puget Sound	1994
Rick Redman	Football (linebacker)	Portland, Oregon	University of Washington	1994
Doug Smart	Basketball (power forward)	Seattle, Washington	Garfield High School, University of Washington	1994
Ken Still	Golf	Tacoma, Washington	Tacoma	1994
Wes Stock	Baseball (pitcher)	Longview, Washington	Longview	1994
LaVern Torgeson	Football (coach)	La Crosse, Washington		1994
Jerry Williams	Football (player, coach)	Spokane, Washington	Washington State University	1994
Phil Mahre	Skiing (alpine skier)	Yakima, Washington	Yakima Valley	1996
Steve Mahre	Skiing (alpine skier)	Yakima, Washington	Yakima Valley	1996
Ahmad Rashad	Football (wide receiver, broadcaster)	Portland, Oregon	Mount Tahoma High School	1996
Stan Sayres	Hydroplane racing (hydroplane driver)	Dayton, Washington		1996
Bob Schloredt	Football (quarterback)	Deadwood, South Dakota	University of Washington	1996
Fred Brown	Basketball			1997
Jimmie Cain	Football (player, official)	Rancho Mirage, California	University of Washington	1997
Tom Gorman	Tennis	Seattle, Washington		1997
Ray Mansfield	Football (center)	Bakersfield, California	Kennewick High School, University of Washington	1997
Anne Quast Sander	Golf	Everett, Washington	Everett	1997
Janet Hopps-Adkisson	Tennis			1998
Don James	Football (coach)	Massillon, Ohio	University of Washington	1998
Jack Sikma	Basketball	Kankakee, Illinois		1998
Rod Belcher	Broadcaster (TV, radio)	Berkeley, California	University of Washington, Seattle University, Pacific Coast League, KING-TV	1999
Rod Funseth	Golf	Spokane, Washington		1999
Clay Huntington	Broadcaster, Sportswriter		The Tacoma Times, Tacoma Athletic Commission, State of Washington Sports Hall of Fame	1999
Steve Largent	Football	Tulsa, Oklahoma		1999
Pat Lesser-Harbottle	Golf			1999
Mac Wilkins	Track and Field (discus throw)	Eugene, Oregon	Clover Park High School	1999

=== 2000s ===
Name	Category (role)	Birthplace	Washington Affiliation(s)	Inducted
Bob Blackburn	Broadcaster (play-by-play)		Seattle SuperSonics	2001
Les Keiter	Broadcaster			2001
Georg Meyers	Sportswriter			2001
Harry Missildine	Sportswriter (columnist, editor)		Spokesman-Review, Washington State University, Gonzaga University	2001
Ira Flagstead	Baseball	Montague, Michigan		2003
Hub Kittle	Baseball	Los Angeles, California		2003
Ryne Sandberg	Baseball	Spokane, Washington		2003
Frank Burgess	Basketball	Eudora, Arkansas		2004
Ben Cheney	Baseball (administrator)	Lima, Montana	Cheney Stadium, Pacific Coast League	2004
Steve Hawes	Basketball	Seattle, Washington	Mercer Island High School, University of Washington, Seattle SuperSonics	2004
Terry Metcalf	Football	Seattle, Washington		2004
Stan Naccarato	Baseball (administrator)		Pacific Coast League	2004
Dave Niehaus	Broadcaster	Princeton, Indiana		2004
Mike Blowers	Baseball (third baseman)	Würzburg, West Germany	Bethel High School, University of Washington, Seattle Mariners	2005
John Chaplin	Track and Field (coach)		Washington State University	2005
Doris Severtson Brown Heritage	Track and Field (running)	Gig Harbor, Washington	Seattle Pacific University	2005
Edo Vanni	Baseball (player, manager, worker)	Black Diamond, Washington	Seattle Rainiers, Sick's Stadium, Seattle Pilots	2005
Trish Bostrom	Tennis (doubles)		University of Washington	2006
John Cherberg	Football (coach)	Pensacola, Florida	University of Washington, Queen Anne High School	2006
Pat McMurtry	Boxing (heavyweight)		Tacoma	2006
Vince Hanson	Basketball (center)	Austin, Minnesota	Lincoln High School, Washington State University	2007
Laurie Niemi	Football (tackle)	Red Lodge, Montana	Washington State University	2007
Bob Robertson	Sportscaster (announcer)	Fullerton, California	Washington State University, Pacific Coast League, Seattle Totems, Seattle Sounders	2007
Frosty Westering	Football (coach)	Council Bluffs, Iowa	Pacific Lutheran University	2007
Guyle Fielder	Hockey (center)	Potlatch, Idaho	Seattle Bombers, Seattle Americans, Seattle Totems	2008
Pete Gross	Broadcaster (radio)		Seattle Seahawks	2008
Mark Rypien	Football (quarterback)	Calgary, Canada	Shadle Park High School, Washington State University	2008
Jack Sprenger	Official (football official)	Tacoma, Washington	Lincoln High School, College of Puget Sound	2008
Lenny Wilkens	Basketball (player, coach)	Brooklyn, New York	Seattle SuperSonics	2008
Jim Zorn	Football (quarterback)	Whittier, California	Seattle Seahawks	2008
Michelle Akers	Soccer (midfielder-forward)	Santa Clara, California	Shorecrest High School	2009
William "Wee" Coyle	Football (quarterback)	Sutter Creek, California	Seattle High School, University of Washington, Gonzaga University	2009
Jud Heathcote	Basketball (coach)	Harvey, North Dakota	South Kitsap High School, West Valley High School, Washington State University	2009
John Stockton	Basketball (point guard)	Spokane, Washington	Gonzaga Preparatory School, Gonzaga University	2009

=== 2010s ===
Name	Category (role)	Birthplace	Washington Affiliation(s)	Inducted
Edgar Martínez	Baseball (batter)	New York City	Seattle Mariners	2010
Dean Nicholson	Basketball (coach)		Puyallup High School, Central Washington University, Yakima SunKings, Yakima Valley College	2010
Emmett Watson	Sportswriter (columnist)	Seattle, Washington	Franklin High School, University of Washington, Seattle Post-Intelligencer, The Seattle Times, Seattle Mariners, Seattle Seahawks	2010
Jim Whittaker	Mountaineering (mountain climbing)	Seattle, Washington	West Seattle High School, Seattle University, REI	2010
Lou Whittaker	Mountaineering (mountain climbing)	Seattle, Washington	West Seattle High School, Seattle University, RMI Expeditions	2010
Charles "Bobo" Brayton	Baseball (coach)		Washington State University	2011
Don Coryell	Football (coach)	Seattle, Washington	University of Washington	2011
Bruce King	Sportscaster (TV, radio)		KOMO-TV, University of Washington, Seattle Seahawks, Seattle SuperSonics, Seattle Mariners	2011
John Olerud	Baseball (batter)	Seattle, Washington	Washington State University, Seattle Mariners	2011
Russell Baze	Horse racing (jockey)	Vancouver, Canada	Granger High School	2012
Drew Bledsoe	Football (quarterback)	Ellensburg, Washington	Walla Walla High School, Washington State University	2012
Cliff McCrath	Soccer (coach)	Detroit, Michigan	Seattle Pacific University, Seattle Sounders	2012
Warren Moon	Football (quarterback)	Los Angeles, California	University of Washington, Seattle Seahawks	2012
Ed Pepple	Basketball (coach)		Mercer Island High School, Lincoln High School, Everett Community College	2012
Emil Sick	Baseball (administrator)	Tacoma, Washington	Seattle Rainiers, Rainier Brewing Company, Puget Sound Blood Bank	2012
Ray Daughters	Swimming (coach)		Queen Anne High School, Washington Athletic Club	2013
Steve Emtman	Football (defensive tackle)	Spokane, Washington	Cheney High School, University of Washington	2013
Gary Payton	Basketball (point guard)	Oakland, California	Seattle SuperSonics	2013
Bob Walsh	Special (promoter)	Winthrop, Massachusetts	Seattle SuperSonics, King County Aquatic Center	2013
Alvin Davis	Baseball (designated hitter)	Riverside, California	Seattle Mariners	2014
Eddie Feigner	Softball (pitcher)	Walla Walla, Washington	Walla Walla	2014
Chip Hanauer	Hydroplane racing (hydroplane driver)	Seattle, Washington	Newport High School, Washington State University	2014
Keith Jackson	Broadcaster (TV, radio)	Roopville, Georgia	Washington State University, KOMO-TV, KOMO radio	2014
Detlef Schrempf	Basketball (forward)	Leverkusen, West Germany	Centralia High School, University of Washington, Seattle SuperSonics	2014
Tom Sneva	Auto racing (race car driver)	Spokane, Washington	Lewis and Clark High School, Eastern Washington University	2014
Jack Thompson	Football (quarterback)	Tutuila, American Samoa	Evergreen High School, Washington State University	2014
Chris Chandler	Football (quarterback)	Everett, Washington	Everett High School, University of Washington	2015
James Edwards	Basketball (center)	Seattle, Washington	Roosevelt High School, University of Washington	2015
John Owen	Sportswriter (columnist, editor)		Seattle Post-Intelligencer	2015
George Pocock	Rowing (boat-builder)	Kingston upon Thames, England	University of Washington	2015
Rosalyn Sumners	Figure skating (ladies singles)	Palo Alto, California	Edmonds	2015
Joyce Walker	Basketball		Garfield High School	2015
Debbie Armstrong	Skiing (alpine skier)	Salem, Oregon	Garfield High School	2017
Byron Beck	Basketball (forward-center)	Ellensburg, Washington	Kittitas High School, Columbia Basin College	2017
Dennis Erickson	Football (coach)	Everett, Washington	Everett High School, Washington State University, Seattle Seahawks	2017
Mike Holmgren	Football (coach)	San Francisco, California	Seattle Seahawks	2017
Kasey Keller	Soccer (goalkeeper)	Olympia, Washington	North Thurston High School, Seattle Sounders FC	2017
Joe Steele	Football (running back)		Bishop Blanchet High School, University of Washington	2017
Curt Warner	Football (running back)	Wyoming County, West Virginia	Seattle Seahawks	2017
Gary Wright	Football (administrator)		Seattle Seahawks, Seattle Sounders FC	2017
Dan Dugdale	Baseball (catcher)	Peoria, Illinois	Dugdale Park, Pacific Northwest League	2018
Albert Johnson	Horse racing (jockey)	Milan, Washington	Spokane County	2018
Kelly Blair LaBounty	Track and Field (heptathlon)	Prosser, Washington	Prosser High School, Seattle Pacific University	2018
Rueben Mayes	Football (running back)	North Battleford, Canada	Washington State University, Seattle Seahawks	2018
Louise Mazzuca	Softball (pitcher)		Stadium High School	2018
Mike Price	Football (coach)	Denver, Colorado	Everett High School, Washington State University, University of Puget Sound	2018
Dan Fitzgerald	Basketball (coach)	San Francisco, California	Gonzaga University, Spokane	2019
Bernie Fryer	Basketball (guard, official)	Bellingham, Washington	Port Angeles High School, Peninsula College	2019
Ken Griffey Jr.	Baseball (batter)	Donora, Pennsylvania	Seattle Mariners	2019
Jason Hanson	Football (placekicker)	Spokane, Washington	Mead High School, Washington State University	2019
Megan (Quann) Jendrick	Swimming (breaststroke)	Tacoma, Washington	Emerald Ridge High School, Pacific Lutheran University	2019
Steve Raible	Broadcaster (radio)	Louisville, Kentucky	Seattle Seahawks	
Rick Rizzs	Sportscaster (TV, radio)	Blue Island, Illinois	Seattle Mariners	
Sugar Ray Seales	Boxing (light welterweight)	Saint Croix, United States Virgin Islands	Stadium High School, Tacoma Boxing Club, Lincoln High School	

=== 2020s ===
Name	Category (role)	Birthplace	Washington Affiliation(s)	Inducted
Dick Cartmell	Official (basketball referee)	Richland, Washington	National Collegiate Athletic Association	2020
Joe Kearney	Athletic Director		Seattle Pacific University, University of Washington	2020
Adam Morrison	Basketball (forward)	Glendive, Montana	Mead High School, Gonzaga University	2020
Aaron Sele	Baseball (pitcher)	Golden Valley, Minnesota	North Kitsap High School, Seattle Mariners	2020
Brad Walker	Track and Field (pole vault)	Aberdeen, South Dakota	University High School, University of Washington	2020
Don Zech	Basketball (coach)		Bishop Blanchet High School, University of Washington, University of Puget Sound	2020
Shannon Higgins-Cirovski	Soccer	Kent, Washington	Mount Rainier High School	2022
Alan Hinton	Soccer	Wednesbury, England	Seattle Sounders, Vancouver Whitecaps, Tacoma Stars	2022
Bruce Kison	Baseball	Pasco, Washington	Pasco High School	2022
Bill North	Baseball	Seattle	Garfield High School, Central Washington University	2022
Pete Rademacher	Boxing	Tieton, Washington	Yakima Valley College, Washington State University	2022
Courtney Thompson	Volleyball	Bellevue, Washington	Kentlake High School, University of Washington	2022
Ted Garhart	Rowing		Garfield High School, University of Washington	2022
Steve Gervais	Football		Puyallup High School, Eatonville High School, Skyline High School, Bishop Blanchet High School	2022
Nathan Adrian	Swimming	Bremerton, Washington	Bremerton High School	2023
Tim Lincecum	Baseball	Bellevue, Washington	Liberty High School, University of Washington	2023
Joe Martin	Baseball manager	Bellingham, Washington	Whatcom High School, Washington State University, Bellingham Bells,	2023
Apolo Ohno	Speed skating	Seattle, Washington	Decatur High School	2023
Kate Starbird	Basketball	West Point, New York	Lakes High School, Seattle Reign, Seattle Storm	2023
Lawyer Milloy	Football	St. Louis, Missouri	Lincoln High School, University of Washington, Seattle Seahawks	2024
Sid Otton	Football coach	Lewiston, Idaho	Tumwater High School	2024
George M. Varnell	Track and field, football, basketball coach	Chicago, Illinois	Gonzaga University, The Seattle Times	2024
Chris Henderson	Soccer	Edmonds, Washington	Cascade High School, Seattle Storm, Seattle Sounders FC	2025
Lori Ann Henry	Soccer	Wilmington, North Carolina	Shorewood High School	2025
Mark Hendrickson	Baseball and basketball	Mount Vernon, Washington	Mount Vernon High School, Washington State University	2025
John Clayton	Sportswriter	Braddock, Pennsylvania	The News Tribune	2025
Christal Engle	Volleyball	Puyallup, Washington	Puyallup High School, University of Washington	2025
Chinook Pass	Thoroughbred	Enumclaw, Washington	Washington State Horse of the Century	2025
Jason Terry	Basketball	Seattle, Washington	Franklin High School	2026
Rhonda Smith-Banchero	Basketball	Seattle, Washington	Franklin High School, University of Washington, Seattle Reign	2026
Kelly Stephens-Tysland	Ice hockey	Seattle, Washington	Shorewood High School	2026
Bob Rondeau	Broadcaster	Denver, Colorado	University of Washington	2026
Richie Sexson	Baseball	Portland, Oregon	Prairie High School, Seattle Mariners	2026
Ed Viesturs	Mountaineering	Fort Wayne, Indiana	University of Washington	2026
Aretha Thurmond	Track and field	Seattle, Washington	Renton High School, University of Washington	2026
