= Wayne Cody =

American radio and television sportscaster

- Born: September 4, 1936; Atlantic City, New Jersey, U.S.
- Died: June 7, 2002 (aged 65); Renton, Washington, U.S.
- Occupations: Radio and television sportscaster
- Children: 2

Wayne (Wendel) Cody (September 4, 1936 – June 7, 2002) was an American popular radio and television sportscaster who spent the bulk of his career in Seattle, broadcasting on KIRO and KIRO-TV. In all, he spent 14 years on KIRO TV and 21 on KIRO Radio. In radio alone, he made more than 43,000 sportscasts.

== Early life and career ==
Cody was born on September 4, 1936, in Atlantic City, New Jersey. He was the only son of Wendel Wayne Cody (1904–1985), a vaudeville musician and radio broadcaster and Ethel (Sack) Cody (1895–1957), a vaudeville musician and actress on Broadway. The family moved to Philadelphia shortly after Cody's birth. He often described his early childhood as being very lonely and sheltered, a situation compounded by his obesity. At a young age he would appear on his father's radio program (The Uncle Wip Show). Cody's father and mother divorced when he was 12, and his father remarried and moved the family to Salt Lake City, Utah. Cody attended East High School, where he was an average student but enjoyed music and drama class. At age 16, Cody decided to pursue a career in radio and acting. After graduation, he began his career working in the mailroom at KNEB, an AM radio station in Scottsbluff, Nebraska. Almost immediately, he was asked to fill in for the vacationing weatherman, and within a few months he was announcing station breaks. He also had a stint in Kokomo, Indiana at WIOU radio as the broadcast voice of the Kokomo HS Wildkats.

Cody met Judy Carter (born 1943), who is related to Lynda Carter, in Danville, Illinois, when he was working at the local radio station, (WDAN) and television station WICD Channel 24, owned by Adam Young Television, which also owned channels 33 and 3 in Champaign-Urbana. Cody had his own daily television show, The Wayne Cody Show where he was known for his amazing ability to improvise and ad-lib. In addition, he became quite popular through the entire Tri-State region for his hilarious and informative weather broadcasts. Cody performed in hundreds of live television commercials, and interviewed Dick Van Dyke live on television during Danville's Dick Van Dyke Day in 1962. He was also an avid golfer. Cody and Judy Carter were married in 1963, and two years later set off for Hollywood on the advice of his friend Dick Van Dyke, who was also from Danville. Van Dyke was starring in his popular CBS sitcom at the time. Cody's original ambition was to be an actor, but his success in this field was limited. Cody had been a regular in summer-stock musicals and plays. On the way to L.A. they had their first baby in Visalia, California, Shay, in 1965. Cody was cast in a pilot that was never picked up, and had a brief appearance on The Red Skelton Show.

Cody moved back to the Midwest and became the radio play-by-play announcer for the Indiana Pacers of the American Basketball Association. During this time his daughter, Shannon Lee, was born in Indianapolis in 1969. Soon after he moved to Ohio and became the traveling public relations spokesman for the Professional Bowler's Association, which was headquartered in Akron. He divorced Judy in 1970 and met Jeanne Boyce in Seattle when the PBA tour had come to town. They were married in 1971, and Cody moved to Seattle to start a new career in sports broadcasting at KTW.

Cody is best known for being the sports anchor on KIRO (channel 7 / CBS) television (1978-1992) and hosting KIRO (710AM) Sportsline, a weeknight sports radio talk show that was the only one of its kind at the time in Seattle. He was also the original sideline reporter for the Seattle Seahawks radio network with play-by-play announcer Pete Gross, Steve Raible and game analyst Don Heinrich. Cody's other play-by-play experience in the Pacific Northwest included the Seattle SuperSonics (NBA) during the late 1970s into the mid-1980s, Seattle Sounders of the North American Soccer League and University of Washington Huskies college football games. Earlier in his career, he was also the sideline reporter for the Seattle SuperSonics (NBA).

He was nicknamed the "Mound of Sound" by Brent Musburger of CBS Sports, because of both his rich voice and his large size. The bearded and rotund Cody, who estimated his own weight at 325 pounds (147.4 kg), energized the sports scene in Western Washington for more than 20 years. He was well known for his on-camera antics and his entertaining style of broadcasting. In 1982, KIRO TV ran a promotion called "Watch Wayne Disappear." The sportscaster was to lose 100 pounds over nine months and collect a $25,000 bonus. He was 25 pounds too heavy by deadline day.

In the late 1980s Cody had a stake in a chain of sports-themed restaurants licensed under the name "Cody's Restaurant and Bakery". There were three locations in the Seattle area.

In 1991, he appeared as himself in the movie Singles, interviewing then-Supersonic player Xavier McDaniel during a dream scene. His son Shay was also in the movie and was working on the TV show Northern Exposure at the time.

== Death ==
Cody had been in declining health for a number of years, suffering from obesity, diabetes and other ailments. He died from complications of a heart attack (coronary thrombosis) on June 7, 2002, in Renton, Washington, at age 65.

Cody had a son, Shay, a graphic designer, and a daughter, Shannon, a model.

== Filmography ==
- Singles (1992)
