= KTRW =

Radio station in Spokane, Washington

- Opportunity, Washington; United States
- Broadcast area: Spokane metropolitan area
- Frequency: 630 kHz
- Branding: KTW 630 AM and 96.5 FM

Programming
- Format: Christian talk and teaching; adult standards
- Affiliations: American Christian Network; Liberty Broadcasting System

Ownership
- Owner: Thomas W. Read; (Mutual Broadcasting System, LLC)
- Sister stations: KSPO

History
- First air date: 1955
- Former call signs: KZUN (1955–1985); KKPL (1985–1989); KHDL (1989–1999); KXLI (1999–2005)

Technical information
- Licensing authority: FCC
- Facility ID: 13568
- Class: D
- Power: 620 watts (day); 62 watts (night)
- Transmitter coordinates: 47°36′29.8″N 117°22′24.1″W
- Translator: 96.5 K243CG (Spokane)

Links
- Public license information: Public file; LMS
- Website: ktrw.com

KTRW (630 kHz) is a locally owned AM radio station licensed to Opportunity, Washington, and serving the Spokane metropolitan area. It airs a Christian talk and teaching radio format for part of its day, with adult standards heard in several time slots by day and most of the night. Though it uses the KTW call sign in its marketing, KTRW is not related to the original Seattle radio station KTW which was at 1250 kHz and is now called KKDZ.

KTRW's license is held by the Mutual Broadcasting System, LLC, owned by Thomas Read. This Mutual Broadcasting System is unrelated to the defunct nationwide radio network of the same name; as part of the station's promotion, KTRW uses the name of another defunct network, the Liberty Broadcasting System.

== Technical data ==
By day, KTRW transmits with 620 watts, with a non-directional signal. It reduces power at night to 62 watts to avoid interfering with other stations on 630 AM. With its low power, KTRW's signal is confined to Spokane and adjacent communities. KTRW is simulcast on 250–watt FM translator K243CG at 96.5 MHz.

== History ==
KTRW originally broadcast on 970 kHz and was the home of KREM-TV's AM sister station until it was sold off to different owners in the 1980s. The current KTRW began as KZUN in 1955. KZUN became KKPL on April 3, 1985. On January 11, 1989, the station changed its call sign to KHDL. On November 5, 1999, the station became KXLI and on October 24, 2005, the current KTRW.

On September 25, 2005, the station changed frequency to KXLI's 630 signal and changed its format. KTRW's schedule includes Christian talk and teaching programs, with adult standards heard several hours each day and most of the night. In 2016, KTRW launched an FM translator station on the 96.5 MHz frequency.
