= Mike Holmgren =

American football player, coach, and executive (born 1948)

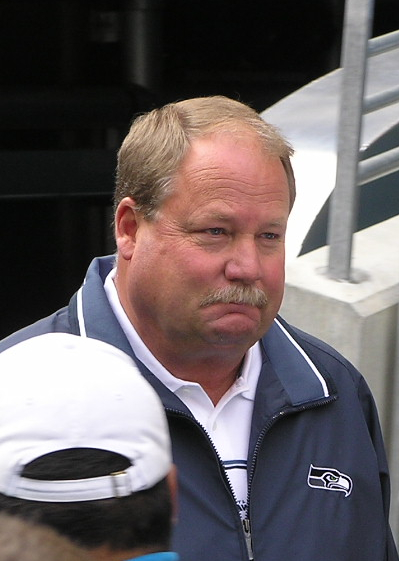
- Holmgren in 2004

No. 19
- Position: Quarterback

Personal information
- Born: June 15, 1948 (age 78); San Francisco, California, U.S.
- Listed height: 6 ft 5 in (1.96 m)
- Listed weight: 245 lb (111 kg)

Career information
- High school: Abraham Lincoln (San Francisco)
- College: USC (1966–1969)
- NFL draft: 1970: 8th round, 201st overall pick

Career history

Playing
- St. Louis Cardinals (1970)*; New York Jets (1970)*
- * Offseason or practice squad member only

Coaching
- Abraham Lincoln HS (CA) (1971) Offensive coordinator; Sacred Heart HS (CA) (1972–1974) Offensive coordinator; Oak Grove HS (CA) (1975–1980) Assistant coach; San Francisco State (1981) Offensive coordinator & quarterbacks coach; BYU (1982–1985) Quarterbacks coach; San Francisco 49ers (1986–1991); Quarterbacks coach (1986–1988); Offensive coordinator & quarterbacks coach (1989–1991); Green Bay Packers (1992–1998) Head coach; Seattle Seahawks (1999–2008) Head coach

Operations
- Seattle Seahawks (1999–2002) Vice president of football operations & general manager; Cleveland Browns (2010–2012) Team president

Awards and highlights
- As a player: National champion (1967); Grantland Rice Trophy (1967); As a head coach: Super Bowl champion (XXXI); Green Bay Packers Hall of Fame; Seattle Seahawks Ring of Honor; State of Washington Sports Hall of Fame (2017); As an assistant coach: 2× Super Bowl champion (XXIII, XXIV); National champion (1984); San Jose Sports Hall of Fame (2024)

Head coaching record
- Regular season: 161–111 (.592)
- Postseason: 13–11 (.542)
- Career: 174–122 (.588)
- Coaching profile at Pro Football Reference

Michael George Holmgren (born June 15, 1948) is an American former football coach and executive in the National Football League (NFL). He began his NFL career as a quarterbacks' coach and later as an offensive coordinator with the San Francisco 49ers, where they won Super Bowls XXIII and XXIV. He served as the head coach of the Green Bay Packers from 1992 to 1998, where he won Super Bowl XXXI, and of the Seattle Seahawks from 1999 to 2008. His last role in the NFL was as team president of the Cleveland Browns from 2010 to 2012. Prior to his career in the NFL, Holmgren coached football at the high school and collegiate levels.

Holmgren is noted for his role in molding quarterbacks such as Steve Young, Brett Favre, and Matt Hasselbeck during his tenures in San Francisco, Green Bay, and Seattle, respectively. Joe Montana won his two MVP awards under the direction of Holmgren in 1989 and 1990.

Under Holmgren's leadership and play-calling, the Green Bay Packers were consistent winners and never had a losing season. He was considered one of the best coaches in the NFL by many fellow coaches and players. He led the Packers to their 12th league championship in Super Bowl XXXI, a 35–21 win over the New England Patriots; and also reached Super Bowl XXXII. Under Holmgren the Seahawks also became a frequent playoff team, including five division titles and the franchise's first Super Bowl appearance in Super Bowl XL. In total, Holmgren won eight division titles as a head coach to go along with twelve playoff appearances, three NFC Championships and one Super Bowl.

As president of the Cleveland Browns, Holmgren failed to improve the team, which had a record of 5–11 the season before his arrival, and 14–34 in his tenure. Despite Holmgren's reputation as a quarterback guru, the Browns fielded three different opening-day starters in his three years with the team. In the face of much criticism in the media and new ownership, he was released by the Browns in November 2012.

He is a weekday daily guest throughout the football season on Seattle radio station Sports Radio KJR across various shows. As of 2021, Holmgren also works as a guest analyst for Super Bowl broadcasts on Westwood One.

== Career ==
=== Playing career ===
Holmgren started out as a tight end before becoming a standout quarterback and punter at San Francisco's Abraham Lincoln High School where he was named "Prep Athlete of the Year" in 1965 and graduated in 1966.

Holmgren continued his playing career in Los Angeles as a quarterback at the University of Southern California from 1966 to 1969, and was a member of the Sigma Chi fraternity. As a sophomore, he was on USC's national championship team of 1967. Holmgren played behind starter Steve Sogge in 1967 and 1968. A shoulder injury put him behind sophomore Jimmy Jones in 1969; he earned his bachelor's degree in 1970.

Although a backup, Holmgren was selected in the 1970 NFL draft by the St. Louis Cardinals; taken in the eighth round (201st overall), he went to camp with both the Cardinals and the New York Jets that year.

=== Coaching career ===
==== High school ====
Holmgren's coaching career began in 1971 at his alma mater, Abraham Lincoln High School in San Francisco, where he also taught history. One year later, he moved to San Francisco's Sacred Heart Cathedral Preparatory as a teacher and assistant coach. He also coached at Oak Grove High School in San Jose, California, from 1975 to 1980 and won one Central Coast Section championship.

==== College ====
In 1981, Holmgren became the offensive coordinator and quarterbacks coach for the San Francisco State Gators, working for Vic Rowen.

From 1982 to 1985, Holmgren was the quarterbacks coach at Brigham Young University under LaVell Edwards. During his four-year tenure at BYU, Holmgren not only helped coach the team's potent offense to a national championship in 1984, but in that period mentored and developed two of BYU's future NFL quarterbacks, Steve Young and Robbie Bosco, and one future NFL head coach, Andy Reid.

Bosco would make it to Green Bay several years before Holmgren, but his eventual appointment as Packers head coach would bring him back into contact with Andy Reid and Steve Young.

Under Holmgren, Bosco led the Cougars to a national championship in 1984, finished third in Heisman Trophy balloting and was drafted by the Green Bay Packers in 1985. Bosco's NFL career was cut short by an arm injury, and he returned to BYU as a quarterbacks coach.

In addition to mentoring quarterbacks at BYU, Holmgren also worked with Reid, at the time a graduate assistant. Reid went on to become an offensive line coach at Holmgren's previous school, San Francisco State, and in 1992 rejoined Holmgren in Green Bay as offensive assistant coach. In 1998, Reid became quarterbacks coach and assistant coach, then in 1999 was named head coach of the Philadelphia Eagles.

==== Professional ====
===== San Francisco 49ers =====
Holmgren began his NFL coaching career as an assistant coach of the San Francisco 49ers from 1986 to 1991. He coached the 49ers' quarterbacks from 1986 to 1988 under head coach Bill Walsh, working with Steve Young, whom he had coached at BYU, and Joe Montana. When George Seifert took over as head coach, Holmgren became the team's offensive coordinator and served from 1989 to 1991. In this stretch, Joe Montana won his two MVP awards and had his best season in 1989. During his tenure with San Francisco, the 49ers posted a 71-–23–1 (74.7%) regular season record to reach the postseason each year except 1991. San Francisco won Super Bowl XXIII over the Cincinnati Bengals 20–16 and Super Bowl XXIV over the Denver Broncos 55–10, setting records for most points, most offensive points, and margin of victory in a Super Bowl. As offensive coordinator in 1989, Holmgren's 49er offense was ranked number one in the NFL. His years with the 49ers have led to later success mentoring other young assistants and Holmgren is one of the larger branches of the Sid Gillman coaching tree, from which Walsh and Seifert descended.

===== Green Bay Packers =====
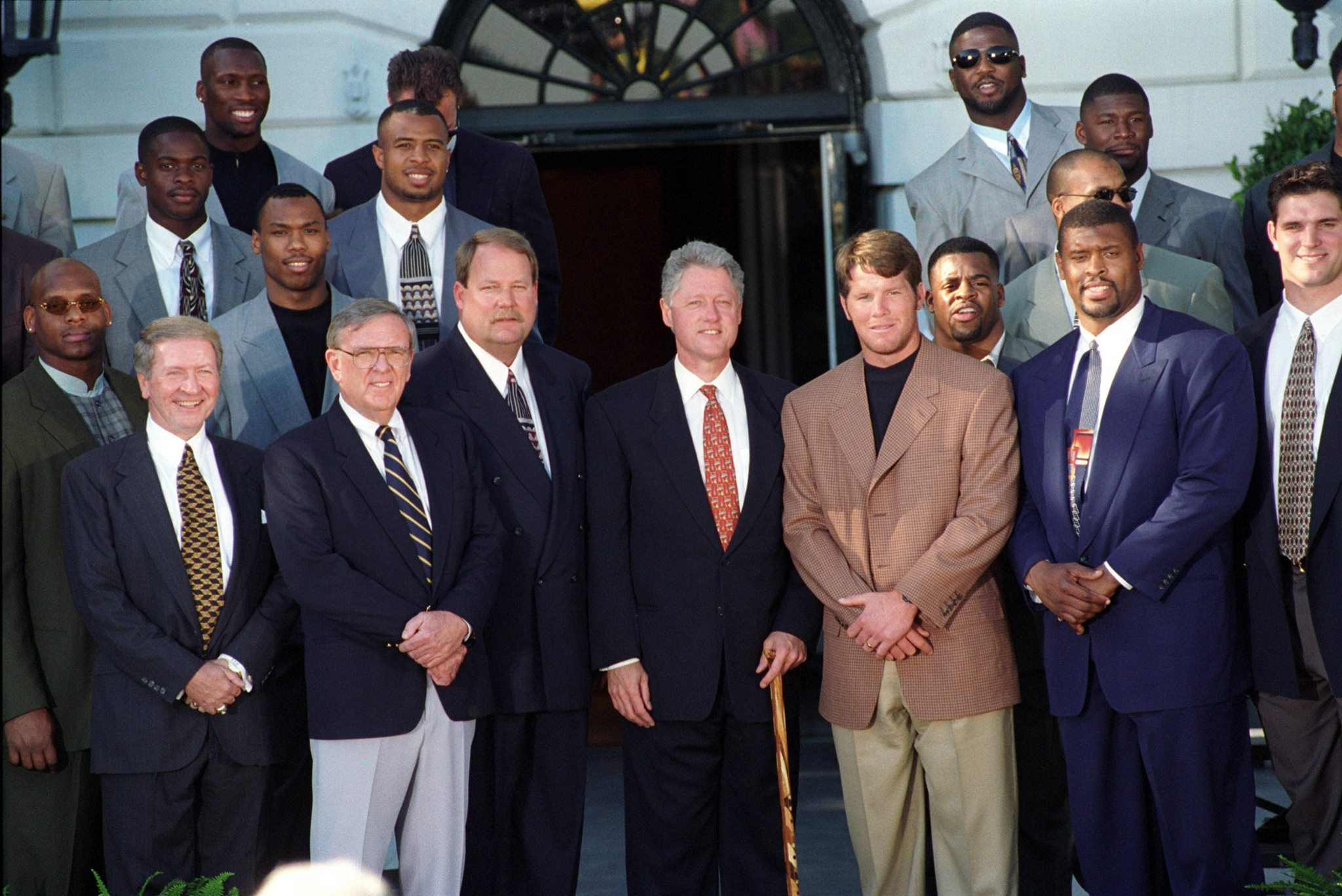
Holmgren in 1997

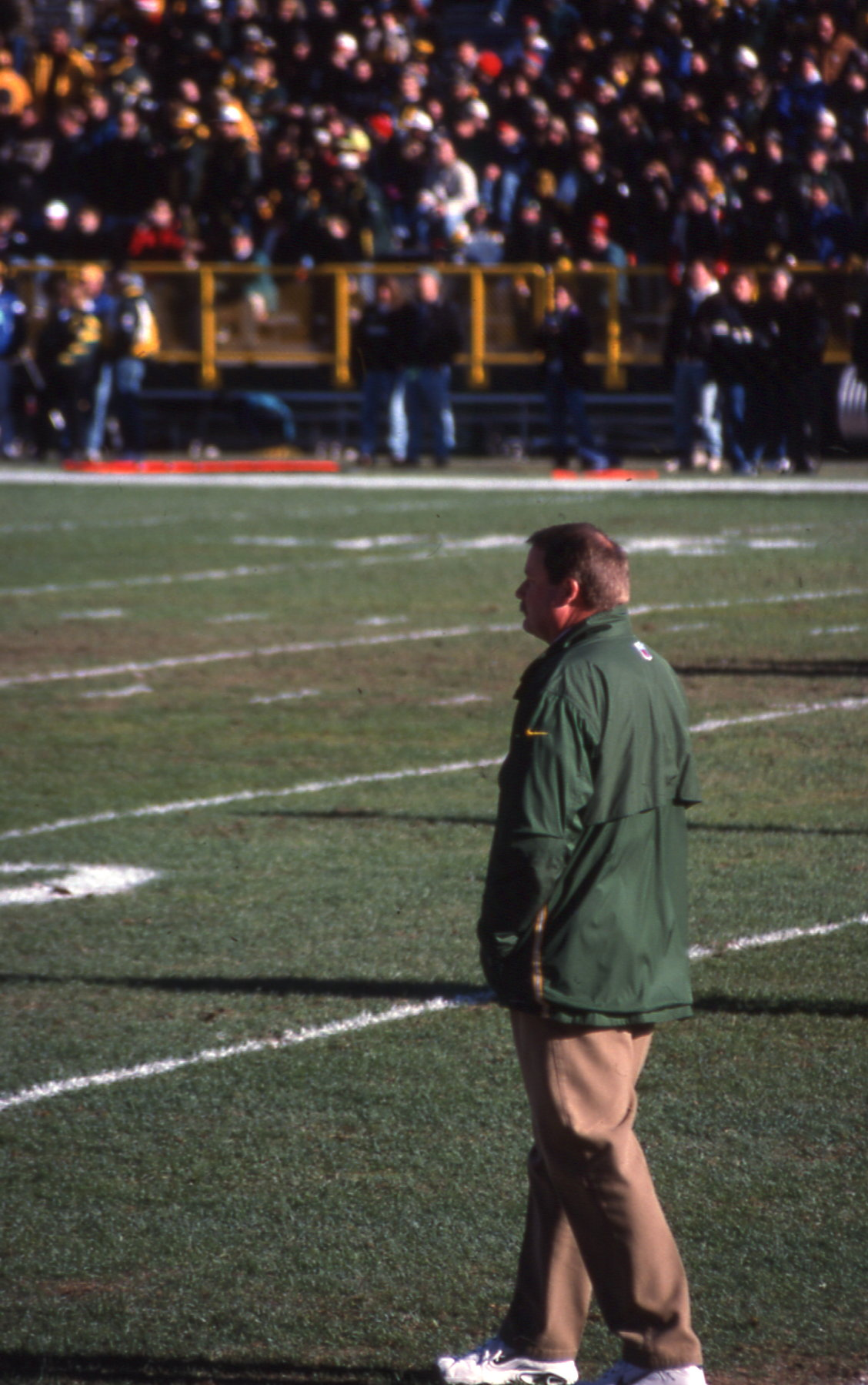
Holmgren in a 1998 game

Holmgren was head coach of the Green Bay Packers from 1992 to 1998, which became one of the most successful coaching stints in NFL history. As head coach of the Packers, Holmgren posted a 75–37–0 (67.0%) regular-season record, a 9–5 (64.3%) postseason mark, and two Super Bowl appearances, including a 35–21 victory over the New England Patriots in Super Bowl XXXI. By winning at least one game in five consecutive postseasons (1993–1997) Holmgren joined John Madden (1973–1977), Andy Reid (2000-2004) (2018-2024), John Harbaugh (2008–2012), Bill Belichick (2003-2007) (2011–2018), Sean McDermott (2020-Present), and Pete Carroll (2012–2016) as the only coaches in league history to accomplish the feat. Holmgren's Packers posted an NFL-best 48–16 (75.0%) record, finished first in the NFC Central Division three times and second once, and set a 7–3 mark in the playoffs between 1995 and 1998. By taking the Packers to six consecutive postseasons (1993–1998), Holmgren set a franchise record with a team that had had just two winning seasons in the 19 years before he was hired. Holmgren is well known for molding quarterback Brett Favre from a wild gun slinger to a three time MVP from 1995 to 1997.

Many of Holmgren's 1992 coaches, including Andy Reid, Steve Mariucci, Dick Jauron, Ray Rhodes, and Jon Gruden, would go on to head coaching careers in the NFL. Marty Mornhinweg, an assistant hired later in Holmgren's tenure at Green Bay, also became an NFL head coach, and was previously an offensive coordinator under Reid with the Philadelphia Eagles from 2006 to 2012. Doug Pederson, a backup quarterback for Holmgren's Packers from 1996 through 1998, would also serve as an assistant under Reid in both Philadelphia and with the Kansas City Chiefs, later winning Super Bowl LII as the head coach of the Eagles in 2018.

===== Seattle Seahawks =====
Holmgren resigned from the Green Bay Packers after the 1998 season to accept an eight-year, $32 million head coach contract offered by the Seattle Seahawks. Originally, Holmgren was the executive vice president and general manager and head coach of the Seahawks. Following the 2002 season, Holmgren was terminated as general manager.

Holmgren took the Seahawks to their first postseason since 1988 during his first season with the club in 1999, breaking a ten-year playoff drought. Holmgren posted a 72–56 (56.3%) regular season record and a 4–6 postseason record, including an AFC West Division title (1999), one NFC Wildcard berth (2003), four consecutive NFC West Division titles (2004, 2005, 2006 and 2007), an NFC championship (2005), and the Seahawks' first-ever appearance in a Super Bowl.

Holmgren's (and the Seahawks' until they won the Super Bowl in 2013) best season to date was 2005. The team posted the best regular season 13–3 (81.3%) record in franchise history to date, set a team record 11 consecutive wins, and won their first playoff game since 1984. Holmgren also molded former Green Bay backup quarterback Matt Hasselbeck into a Pro Bowl and Super Bowl quarterback in the 2005 NFL season (much as he did with Favre in the 1990s), and coached Shaun Alexander to the NFL's MVP, a 2005 rushing title, and an NFL record 28 touchdowns in a single season.

With the 2005 NFC Championship win, Holmgren became the fifth member of a small coaching fraternity that has taken two different NFL franchises to the Super Bowl, joining Bill Parcells, Dan Reeves, Don Shula, Dick Vermeil, and later John Fox and Andy Reid. Had the Seahawks won Super Bowl XL, he would have become the first head coach in NFL history to win a Super Bowl with two different franchises, however they fell short, losing 21–10 to the Pittsburgh Steelers in a game that was remembered heavily for its questionable officiating.

On January 22, 2008, Holmgren announced he would serve out the remaining year of his contract with a lame duck year and end his tenure as head coach of the Seattle Seahawks at the end of the 2008 NFL season. Jim L. Mora, the defensive backs coach, succeeded Holmgren upon his departure.

On December 19, 2008, Holmgren received the Steve Largent Award, becoming the first coach in Seahawks history to attain the accolade.

=== Post-coaching career ===
On February 1, 2009, Holmgren served as an analyst for NBC's coverage of Super Bowl XLIII. Since 2012, He has served as an analyst for Seattle Sports station KJR 950AM and as a color analyst for Westwood One's radio broadcast of Super Bowl LI.

On December 21, 2009, Holmgren accepted the job to be president of the Cleveland Browns. On January 3, 2011, Holmgren fired Browns coach Eric Mangini after a disappointing 5–11 record. On October 16, 2012, Browns owner Jimmy Haslam announced that Holmgren would leave the team at the end of the 2012 season.

In 2015, Holmgren was in consideration for the New York Jets head coaching job, but removed himself from speculation after entertaining the idea. The Jets would end up hiring Todd Bowles.

In 2020, he was named as a coaching finalist for the Pro Football Hall of Fame's "Centennial Slate". He was again up for the class of 2021, but was among the coaches part of the final cut.

He was inducted into the Seahawks Ring of Honor on October 31, 2021.

In 2024, he was named as a coach finalist for the Pro Football Hall of Fame.

== Head coaching record ==
Team	Year	Regular season					Postseason			
Team	Year	Won	Lost	Ties	Win %	Finish	Won	Lost	Win %	Result
GB	1992	9	7	0	.563	2nd in NFC Central	–	–	–	–
GB	1993	9	7	0	.563	3rd in NFC Central	1	1	.500	Lost to Dallas Cowboys in NFC Divisional Game
GB	1994	9	7	0	.563	2nd in NFC Central	1	1	.500	Lost to Dallas Cowboys in NFC Divisional Game
GB	1995	11	5	0	.688	1st in NFC Central	2	1	.667	Lost to Dallas Cowboys in NFC Championship Game
GB	1996	13	3	0	.813	1st in NFC Central	3	0	1.000	Super Bowl XXXI champions
GB	1997	13	3	0	.813	1st in NFC Central	2	1	.667	Lost to Denver Broncos in Super Bowl XXXII
GB	1998	11	5	0	.688	2nd in NFC Central	0	1	.000	Lost to San Francisco 49ers in NFC Wild Card Game
GB Total		75	37	0	.670		9	5	.643	
SEA	1999	9	7	0	.563	1st in AFC West	0	1	.000	Lost to Miami Dolphins in AFC Wild Card Game
SEA	2000	6	10	0	.375	4th in AFC West	–	–	–	–
SEA	2001	9	7	0	.563	2nd in AFC West	–	–	–	–
SEA	2002	7	9	0	.438	3rd in NFC West	–	–	–	–
SEA	2003	10	6	0	.625	2nd in NFC West	0	1	0.000	Lost to Green Bay Packers in NFC Wild Card Game
SEA	2004	9	7	0	.563	1st in NFC West	0	1	0.000	Lost to St. Louis Rams in NFC Wild Card Game
SEA	2005	13	3	0	.813	1st in NFC West	2	1	0.667	Lost to Pittsburgh Steelers in Super Bowl XL
SEA	2006	9	7	0	.563	1st in NFC West	1	1	0.500	Lost to Chicago Bears in NFC Divisional Game
SEA	2007	10	6	0	.625	1st in NFC West	1	1	0.500	Lost to Green Bay Packers in NFC Divisional Game
SEA	2008	4	12	0	.250	3rd in NFC West	–	–	–	–
SEA Total		86	74	0	.541		4	6	.400	
Total		161	111	0	.592		13	11	.542	

== Coaching tree ==
Holmgren has worked under two head coaches:

- Bill Walsh, San Francisco 49ers (1986–1988)
- George Seifert, San Francisco 49ers (1989–1991)

Ten of Holmgren's assistant coaches/executives became head coaches in the NFL or NCAA:

- Ray Rhodes, Philadelphia Eagles (1995–1998), Green Bay Packers (1999)
- Steve Mariucci, San Francisco 49ers (1997–2002), Detroit Lions (2003–2005)
- Jon Gruden, Oakland / Las Vegas Raiders (1998–2001, 2018–2021), Tampa Bay Buccaneers (2002–2008)
- Dick Jauron, Chicago Bears (1999–2003), Buffalo Bills (2006–2009)
- Andy Reid, Philadelphia Eagles (1999–2012), Kansas City Chiefs (2013–present)
- Mike Sherman, Green Bay Packers (2000–2005), Texas A&M (2008–2011)
- Marty Mornhinweg, Detroit Lions (2001–2002)
- Jim Zorn, Washington Redskins (2008–2009)
- Jim L. Mora, Atlanta Falcons (2004-2006) Seattle Seahawks (2009), UCLA (2012–2017), UConn (2022–present)
- Stump Mitchell, Southern (2010–2012)

== Personal life ==
Holmgren and his wife, Kathy, met at age 12 and have been married since June 15, 1971. They wed on his birthday so he would not forget the date. Holmgren first proposed marriage to Kathy when he was age 15, to which she replied: "Nope." They have four daughters — twins Calla and Jenny (born 1973), Emily (1977) and Gretchen (1981). They also have five granddaughters — Emma, Emerson, Mary, Isabelle and Eloise. He also has four grandsons — Luke, Michael, Samuel and Theodore. Holmgren and his wife currently reside in Seattle, Washington.

The Holmgren family is heavily involved in the Evangelical Covenant Church and the denomination's North Park University in Chicago. In 2004, they led the fundraising drive to build the university's Holmgren Athletic Complex.

Holmgren's grandfather, Jens Bugge, who served briefly as a commandant at West Point and wrote a book on military strategy, also had the distinction of being eulogized by Gen. Douglas MacArthur. Both of Holmgren's parents were officers in the Salvation Army.

Holmgren is a brother in the Sigma Chi fraternity.

Holmgren Way is a street named for the coach and is located in Green Bay, Wisconsin.

== See also ==
- List of National Football League head coaches with 50 wins
- List of Super Bowl head coaches
