= KTSL =

- Medical Lake, Washington; United States
- Broadcast area: Spokane metropolitan area
- Frequency: 101.9 MHz

Programming
- Format: Contemporary worship music
- Affiliations: Air1

Ownership
- Owner: Educational Media Foundation; (K-LOVE, Inc.)
- Sister stations: KLSN

History
- First air date: March 7, 1989
- Former call signs: KAAR (1988–1992)
- Former frequencies: 95.3 MHz (1989–1994)

Technical information
- Licensing authority: FCC
- Facility ID: 63869
- Class: C2
- ERP: 28,500 watts
- HAAT: 198 meters (650 ft)
- Transmitter coordinates: 47°42′11″N 117°44′26″W

Links
- Public license information: Public file; LMS
- Webcast: Listen live
- Website: air1.com

KTSL (101.9 FM) is a contemporary worship music radio station licensed to Medical Lake, Washington, United States, and serving the Spokane metropolitan area as an affiliate of Air1. KTSL is owned by Educational Media Foundation.

== History ==
On March 7, 1989, the station first signed on the air. It originally had the call sign KAAR and broadcast at 95.3 MHz. In 1991, it moved to 101.9 MHz, initially called "The Word In Music" and later "Power 101.9", to reflect its Christian rock sound. In July 2001, Power 101.9 changed its name to "Spirit 101.9", also changing its format to a more worship-styled music.

On July 4, 2005, after seeing its ratings drop, Spirit 101.9 was changed back to Christian rock and called "101.9 Spirit FM". As of May 2008, KTSL is broadcasting the Air 1 Radio Network, an adult contemporary format playing well established songs combined with worship music. The KTSL call letters were once used on channel 2 in Los Angeles, now KCBS-TV.

KTSL logo prior to Air 1 network changeover
