= Matt Hasselbeck =

American football player (born 1975)

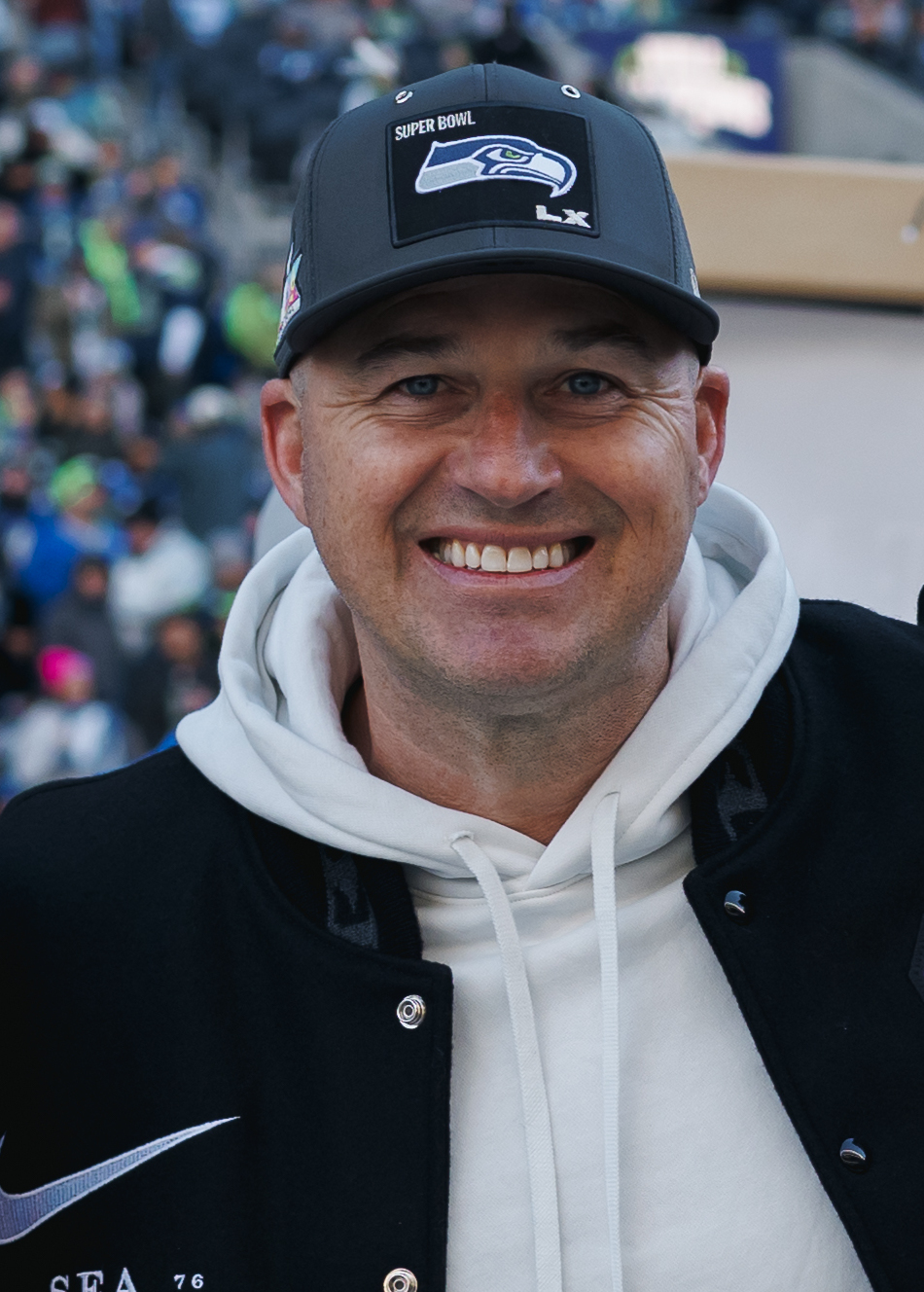
- Hasselbeck in 2026

No. 11, 8
- Position: Quarterback

Personal information
- Born: September 25, 1975 (age 51); Boulder, Colorado, U.S.
- Listed height: 6 ft 4 in (1.93 m)
- Listed weight: 235 lb (107 kg)

Career information
- High school: Xaverian Brothers (Westwood, Massachusetts)
- College: Boston College (1994–1997)
- NFL draft: 1998: 6th round, 187th overall pick

Career history

Playing
- Green Bay Packers (1998–2000); Seattle Seahawks (2001–2010); Tennessee Titans (2011–2012); Indianapolis Colts (2013–2015)

Coaching
- Ensworth High School (2024–present) Offensive Coordinator

Awards and highlights
- 3× Pro Bowl (2003, 2005, 2007); Seattle Seahawks 35th Anniversary team; Seattle Seahawks Top 50 players; Seattle Seahawks Ring of Honor

Career NFL statistics
- Passing attempts: 5,330
- Passing completions: 3,222
- Completion percentage: 60.5%
- TD–INT: 212–153
- Passing yards: 36,638
- Passer rating: 82.4
- Stats at Pro Football Reference

Matthew Michael Hasselbeck (born September 25, 1975) is an American former professional football quarterback who played in the National Football League (NFL) for 18 seasons, primarily with the Seattle Seahawks. He played college football for the Boston College Eagles and was selected in the sixth round of the 1998 NFL draft by the Green Bay Packers. After a season on the practice squad and two seasons backing up Brett Favre, he was traded to the Seattle Seahawks in 2001, where he spent the majority of his career. Hasselbeck led Seattle to six playoff appearances, including the franchise's first Super Bowl appearance during the 2005 season. He was selected to three Pro Bowls in his career. Hasselbeck also played for the Tennessee Titans and Indianapolis Colts. He is a former analyst for ESPN's Sunday NFL Countdown and Monday Night Countdown.

In 2024, Hasselbeck was hired by The Ensworth School in Nashville, Tennessee to serve as the offensive coordinator of the high school’s football team, led by his brother and head Ensworth football coach Tim Hasselbeck.

== Early life ==
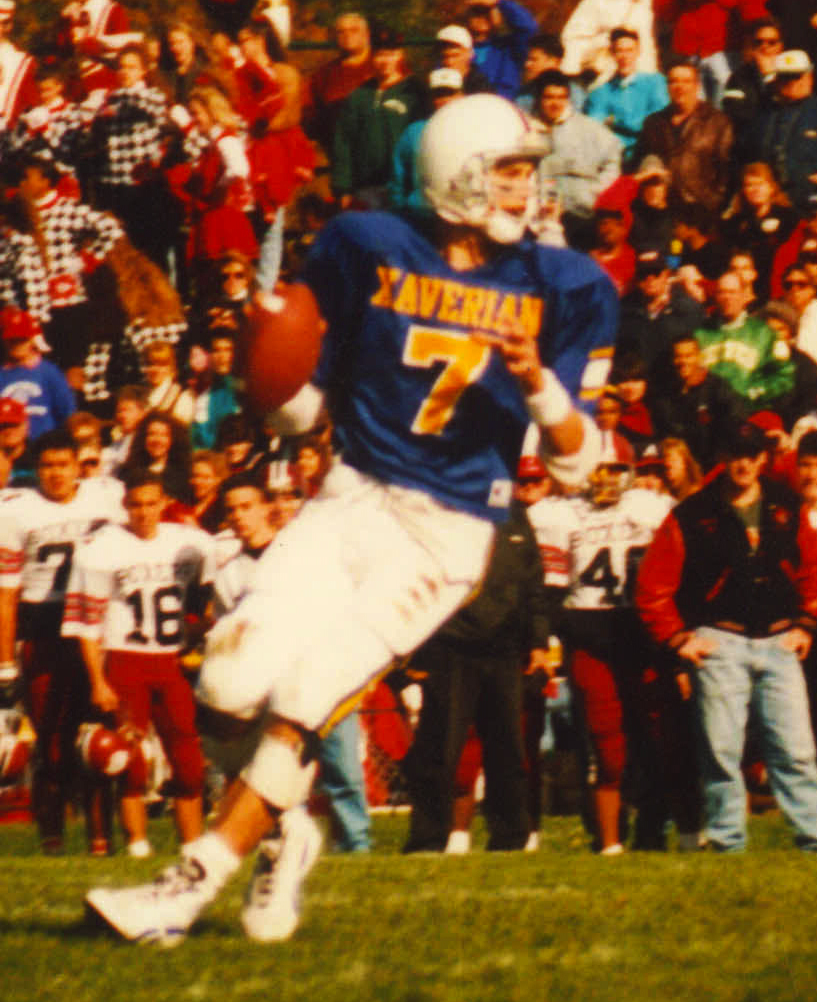
Hasselbeck at Xaverian Brothers High School in 1993

Hasselbeck is the son of Mary Beth "Betsy" (Rueve) and Don Hasselbeck, a former New England Patriots tight end.

Matt and his younger brothers Tim and Nathanael grew up in Norfolk, Massachusetts, and attended Xaverian Brothers High School in Westwood.

He was selected as an honorable mention All-American by USA Today as a high school senior.

== College career ==
Hasselbeck attended Boston College near his family's hometown. He played for the Boston College Eagles football team from 1994 to 1997, including two years with his younger brother Tim. Hasselbeck finished his college career as the starting quarterback (a position his brother Tim would later hold with the Eagles). Matt had career totals of 4,548 passing yards, 22 passing touchdowns, and 26 interceptions. He graduated with a degree in marketing.

== Professional career ==
=== Green Bay Packers ===
Hasselbeck was selected by the Green Bay Packers in the sixth round (187th overall) of the 1998 NFL draft. He joined the team's practice squad in 1998 and was the backup for starting quarterback Brett Favre for the 1999 and 2000 NFL seasons. In Week 15 of the 1999 season, he threw his first professional touchdown on a nine-yard pass to Jeff Thomason in the 24–20 loss to the Minnesota Vikings. He had his first meaningful action in Week 11 of the 2000 season. He went 9-of-18 for 93 yards and a touchdown in a 20–15 road loss to the Tampa Bay Buccaneers.

=== Seattle Seahawks ===
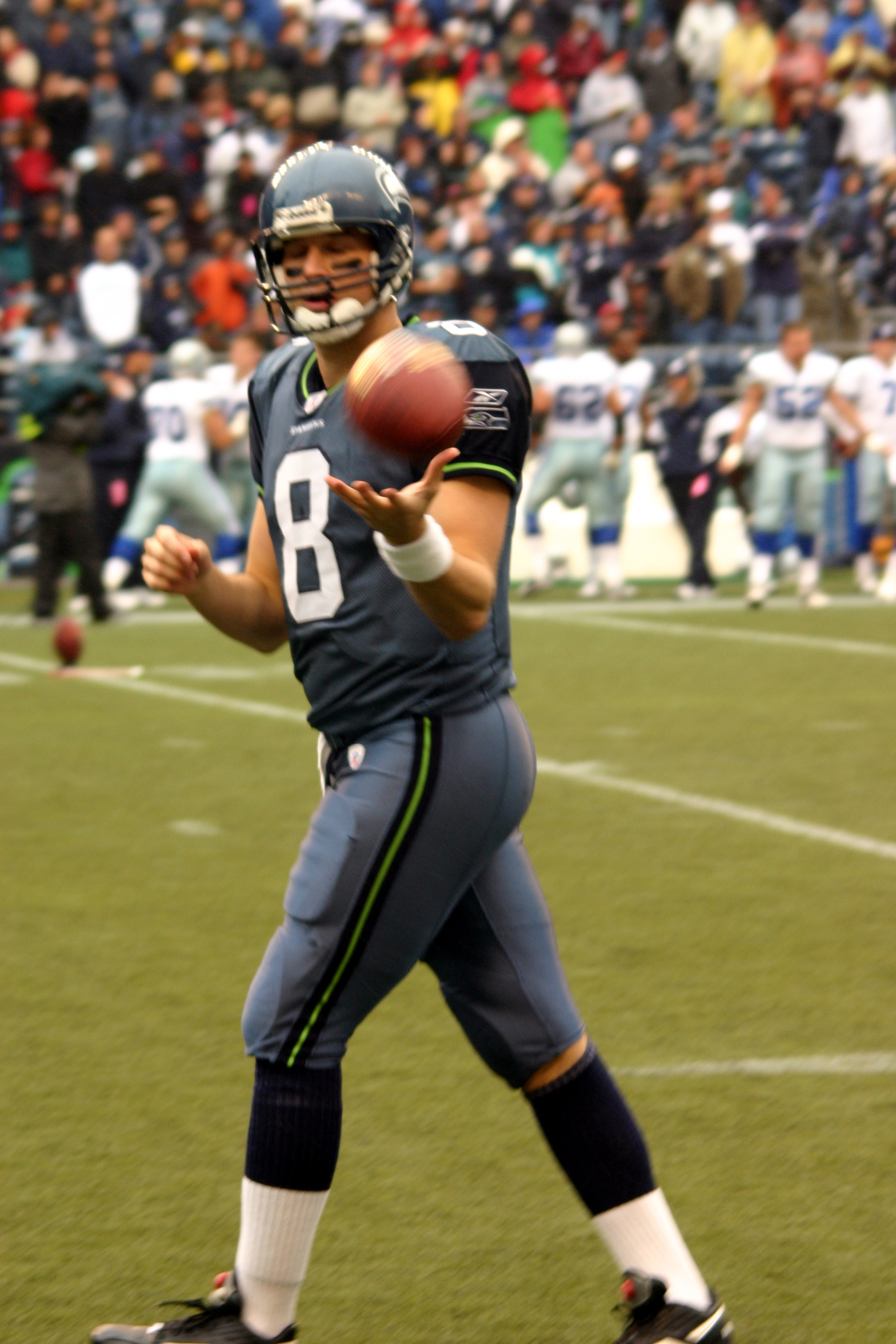
Hasselbeck during the Seahawks' Super Bowl XL campaign in 2005

Hasselbeck joined former Packers head coach Mike Holmgren and the Seattle Seahawks on March 2, 2001. The Packers traded him, along with their first draft pick (17th overall), to the Seahawks for their first (10th overall) and third-round draft picks (72nd overall).

In his early years in Seattle, Hasselbeck battled for playing time with Trent Dilfer. He started all 13 games he appeared in during the 2001 season. He passed for 2,023 yards, seven touchdowns, and eight interceptions.

In Week 12 of the 2002 season, against the Kansas City Chiefs, Hasselbeck had 362 yards and three touchdowns in the 39–32 win. He was named NFC Offensive Player of the Week for Week 12. In Week 13, he had 427 yards, three touchdowns, and two interceptions in the 31–24 loss to the San Francisco 49ers. In Week 17, he passed for 449 yards, two touchdowns, and two interceptions to go with a rushing touchdown. in a 31–28 road overtime win against the San Diego Chargers. He finished the 2002 season with 3,075 yards, 15 touchdowns, and ten interceptions.

After a strong finish in 2002, Hasselbeck entered 2003 as the unquestioned starter. In Week 12, he had 333 yards and five touchdowns in a road overtime 44–41 loss to the Baltimore Ravens. Hasselbeck started all 16 games, leading Seattle to a 10–6 record for the first time since 1988 and a Wild Card berth. He also was selected to the Pro Bowl. The 2003 NFC Wild Card Game against the Green Bay Packers went into overtime where, at the overtime coin toss, Hasselbeck famously said "we want the ball and we're going to score". During the second overtime possession for the Seahawks, Hasselbeck threw an interception to Packers defensive back Al Harris which was returned 52 yards down the sideline for a touchdown. It gave Green Bay a 33–27 overtime victory.

In 2004, Hasselbeck won the 2004 NFL Quarterback Challenge. He was named NFC Offensive Player of the Month for December. He passed for 3,382 yards, 22 touchdowns, and 15 interceptions to go with a rushing touchdown in the 2004 season. He led Seattle to their first NFC West title since conference realignment in 2002.

In 2005, Hasselbeck had one of his most productive career performances, earning the highest passer rating in the NFC, and leading the Seahawks to the playoffs for the third consecutive year while clinching the NFC's top seed. In the 2005 season, he had 3,459 yards, 24 touchdowns, and nine interceptions to go with a rushing touchdown. He led the Seahawks to Super Bowl XL, in which they lost to the Pittsburgh Steelers, and was the starting quarterback for the NFC in the 2006 Pro Bowl.

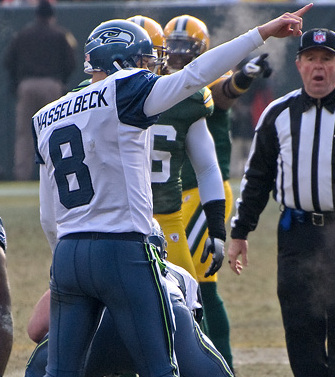
Hasselbeck (8) leads the Seattle offense at Lambeau Field in 2009

In Week 6 of the 2005 season, Hasselbeck had 227 passing yards, five touchdowns, and three interceptions in a 42–30 win over the New York Giants. Hasselbeck led the Seahawks to a 4–1 record to start the 2006 season before being seriously injured on Week 7. Minnesota Vikings linebacker E. J. Henderson rolled into Hasselbeck's right leg. The result was a second degree MCL sprain, causing Hasselbeck to miss four games. Hasselbeck contended that Henderson could have avoided injuring him. Upon returning he subsequently broke fingers on his non-throwing hand, but continued to lead his team to a 9–7 record and the divisional round of the post-season. The fourth-seeded Seahawks defeated the Dallas Cowboys 21–20 in the wild card round in Seattle, then lost to the top-seeded Chicago Bears in overtime, 27–24.

In Week 14 of the 2007 season, Hasselbeck had 272 yards and four touchdowns in a 42–21 win over the Arizona Cardinals. In 2007, Hasselbeck led his team to its fourth consecutive division title and fifth consecutive playoff appearance. He had 3,966 passing yards, 28 touchdowns (both career highs), 62.6% completion percentage, and a 91.4 passer rating. He threw for 229 yards in a 35–14 NFC wild card victory over the Washington Redskins. The third-seeded Seahawks lost in the divisional round to the NFC's No. 2 seed Green Bay Packers, losing 42–20 in the snow at Lambeau Field despite an early 14–0 lead.

Hasselbeck set career highs in yards, attempts, and touchdown passes in the 2007 season and was elected to his third Pro Bowl.

In 2008, Hasselbeck suffered from a back injury that affected a nerve in his lower back, creating a weakness in his leg that brought on a knee injury. Hasselbeck twisted his back awkwardly in the preseason opener on August 8 at Minnesota and missed the rest of the preseason. His bulging disk was diagnosed and treated with injections and he opened the regular season as the starter, but he hurt his knee after a hit early in the Seahawks' 44–6 loss to the New York Giants on October 5. He also received a helmet-to-helmet hit against the Arizona Cardinals. These injuries caused Hasselbeck to miss most of the 2008 NFL season.

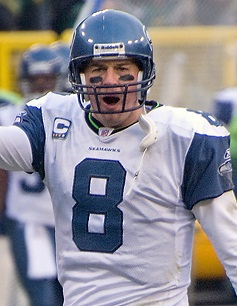
Hasselbeck in 2009

In the 2009 season opener, things did not start out well for Hasselbeck, who threw two interceptions in the first quarter. After that Hasselbeck dominated the rest of the way, completing 25 of 36 passes for 279 yards and three touchdowns in their 28–0 win over the St. Louis Rams. During Week 2 of the season, Hasselbeck fractured his rib against the San Francisco 49ers and missed the next two games against the Chicago Bears (Week 3) and the Indianapolis Colts (Week 4). During Week 5, playing the Jacksonville Jaguars, Hasselbeck threw four touchdown passes in the Seahawks' second shutout of the season, beating Jacksonville 41–0. In Week 6, Hasselbeck played his career-worst, losing to the Arizona Cardinals 27–3. In a Week 16 road game at Lambeau Field, Hasselbeck had one touchdown and four interceptions (three of which set up their opponents touchdowns) as the Seahawks would suffer a 48–10 loss to the Green Bay Packers. He finished the 2009 season with 3,029 yards, 17 touchdowns, and 17 interceptions.

During the final week of the season, Hasselbeck won the Seahawks' "Steve Largent Award."

In 2010, the season started off strong for Hasselbeck, leading his team to a 4–2 record and victories over the Chicago Bears and San Diego Chargers. But the degree of Hasselbeck's health would prove to be inconsistent, with injuries leading him to sit out two games during the season, and leading the Seahawks to lose seven of their last ten. Nevertheless, Seattle would make the playoffs with their fifth NFC West division championship. He finished the 2010 season with 3,001 yards, 12 touchdowns, and 17 interceptions.

Seattle became the first team with a losing record to host a playoff game, taking on the defending Super Bowl XLIV champion New Orleans Saints during wild card weekend. Despite being 11 point underdogs, Hasselbeck had one of the most memorable and clutch performances of his career. He threw for 272 yards, four touchdowns (a franchise postseason record), and an interception coming from a tipped ball with a 113.03 passer rating, leading the Seahawks to victory over the Saints. However, Seattle would go on to lose 35–24 in the divisional playoffs against the Chicago Bears. Hasselbeck still played well, however, with over 250 yards passing and three touchdowns.

==== Playoff career ====
Hasselbeck's 11 postseason starts as a quarterback rank 16th all-time in NFL history, leading the Seahawks to five postseasons in a row under Mike Holmgren at one point.

In 2003, his first playoff appearance, Hasselbeck pronounced, "we want the ball and we're going to score" at the coin flip of overtime with the Green Bay Packers. Hasselbeck was intercepted by Al Harris in overtime, who returned the pass for a game-winning touchdown. After that season, Hasselbeck would go on to lead Seattle to six playoff appearances in eight years.

In 2005, Hasselbeck led the Seahawks to Super Bowl XL, where they lost to the Pittsburgh Steelers in a game remembered for its poor officiating. The NFL Network called it one of the 10 most controversial games in NFL history. Head referee Bill Leavy later apologized to Hasselbeck at a Seahawks offseason practice in 2010, publicly saying he would "go to his grave for kicking several calls in the fourth quarter that affected the outcome of the game."

In 2006, Hasselbeck rallied the Seahawks in the fourth quarter and threw the game-winning touchdown at Qwest Field to beat the Dallas Cowboys 21–20, but that occurred before Tony Romo's infamous dropped snap.

In 2010, Hasselbeck led the Seahawks to a surprising playoff upset when he beat the New Orleans Saints, who were the defending Super Bowl XLIV champions and 11-point favorites. Although the game would be remembered for Marshawn Lynch's Beast Quake run, Hasselbeck was an integral part in the win with 272 yards and four touchdowns. The game was called "Hasselbeck's finest hour" by ESPN, and turned out to be his final game at Qwest Field in Seattle leading Seattle to a 41–36 upset of the New Orleans Saints.

==== Departure from Seattle ====
Hasselbeck's departure from the Seahawks was largely a surprise, given his status with the Seattle fan base. At the conclusion of the 2010 season Pete Carroll announced re-signing Hasselbeck was the Seahawks "number one offseason priority", with Hasselbeck emphasizing his desire to retire in Seattle. However, the two sides had trouble reaching an agreement as Hasselbeck reportedly turned down a one-year offer before the NFL lockout began, asking for two years. When Hasselbeck was rumored to be "Plan A" for the Tennessee Titans and rumors surfaced the Seahawks were pursuing the late Tarvaris Jackson instead of Hasselbeck, Seattle fans began a web and social media campaign at the end of the NFL lockout in 2011 to "Bring Back Matt", with a website www.bringbackmatt.com. Pete Carroll and general manager John Schneider called Hasselbeck after the lockout to let them know they were "moving on." Hasselbeck described the call as "worse than breaking up with an old girlfriend." The Seahawks took out a full-page ad in The Seattle Times the following day to salute Hasselbeck and his family for their work.

=== Tennessee Titans ===
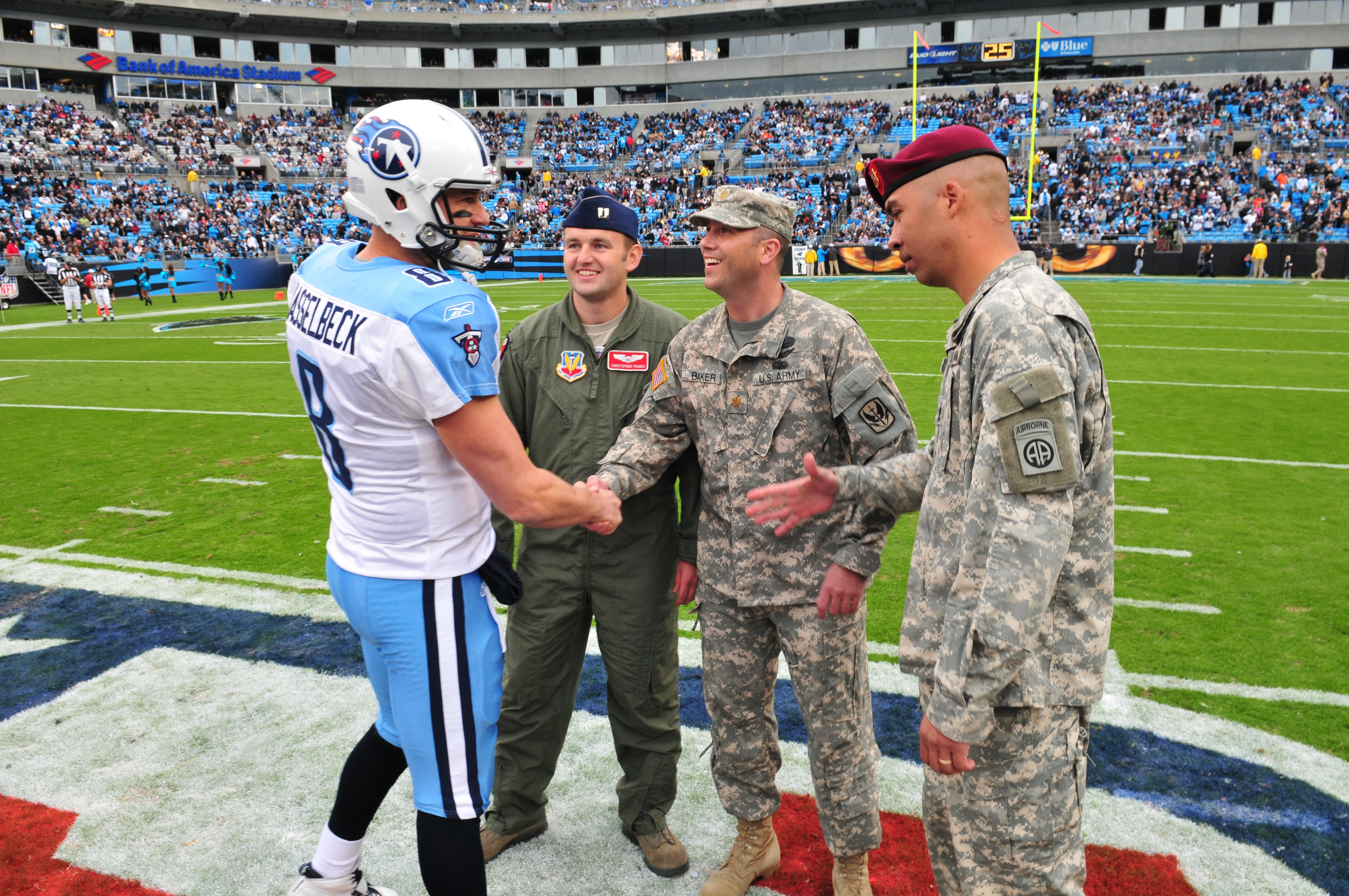
Hasselbeck with U.S. soldiers prior to kickoff at a game in November 2011.

On July 29, 2011, Hasselbeck signed a three-year, $21 million deal to play for the Tennessee Titans. He was recruited by Mike Reinfeldt, the former vice president of football administration for the Seahawks and current executive vice president and the chief operating officer for the Titans, who was part of the team for four of Hasselbeck's five NFC West division championships and Super Bowl appearance. Hasselbeck was targeted by the Titans, who were looking for a veteran quarterback to help lead the team to wins while also mentoring first-round draft pick Jake Locker. The Titans finished 2011 with a 9–7 record, narrowly missing out on the final playoff berth due to losing to the Cincinnati Bengals in Week 9. He finished the 2011 season with 3,571 yards, 18 touchdowns, and 14 interceptions.

Hasselbeck's first action in the 2012 season came in Week 1 against the New England Patriots after Locker left early in the game with a shoulder injury. Hasselbeck started the next four weeks while Locker healed, finishing 2–2 in those starts; his victories were at home against Pittsburgh (the first Titans win over Pittsburgh since 2008) and at Buffalo, winning on a last-minute touchdown to Nate Washington. The Titans went 6–10 on the season. He finished with 1,367 yards, seven touchdowns, and five interceptions in eight games.

On March 18, 2013, Hasselbeck was released by the Titans.

=== Indianapolis Colts ===
On March 19, 2013, the Indianapolis Colts signed Hasselbeck to a two-year deal worth up to $7.25 million. He beat Chandler Harnish to win the backup job for the 2013 season. Backing up Andrew Luck, Hasselbeck saw little playing time during his first two years but mentored the budding star. In 2013, Hasselbeck attempted only 12 passes, completing seven for 130 yards and one interception. The following season, Hasselbeck appeared in only four games but led two touchdown drives, one during a blowout loss against the Dallas Cowboys and another during garbage time in the season finale against division rival (and former team) the Tennessee Titans.

==== 2015 season ====
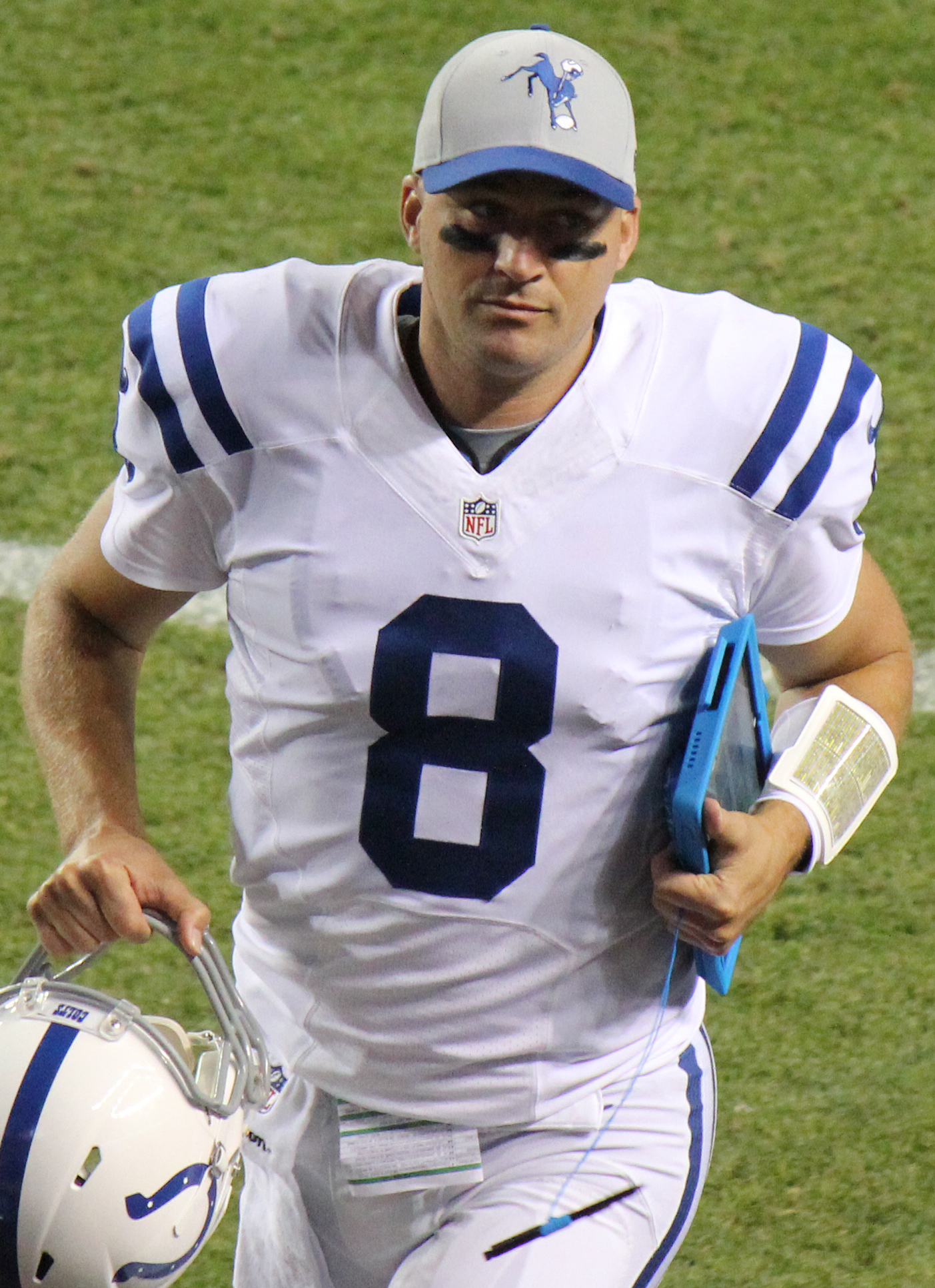
Hasselbeck in 2014

On February 26, 2015, Hasselbeck signed a one-year contract to remain with the Colts.

Hasselbeck made his first start with the Colts on October 4, 2015, filling in for the injured Luck. He led the Colts to an overtime win, defeating the Jacksonville Jaguars, 16–13. After a short week that included Hasselbeck being ill from a bacterial infection and having virtually no practice time, he was once again called upon to play for Luck. He became only the second 40-year-old NFL quarterback to win back-to-back games, when he engineered a 27–20 win over the Houston Texans on October 8, 2015. Over those two starts, he completed 48 of 76 passes for three touchdowns and no turnovers, compiling a 2–0 record as starter.

On November 22, 2015, Hasselbeck started his third game for the Colts, as Luck suffered a kidney injury that would ultimately take him out for the remainder of the season. He passed for 213 yards with two touchdowns and two interceptions in a come-from-behind win over the Atlanta Falcons. The win kept Indianapolis in the lead of the AFC South division and improved them to a 5–5 record. The following week, the Colts took on the Tampa Bay Buccaneers, who were on a four-game winning streak. Hasselbeck led the team to a 25–12 win, passing for 315 yards with two touchdowns and no interceptions, which led to a passer rating of 100.8. Hasselbeck led the Colts to a 6–5 record with a 4–0 record as starter at the age of 40, and was the first quarterback in NFL history to do so. However, injuries began to take their toll on the aging quarterback, and Hasselbeck's play would begin to deteriorate as the Colts lost three straight games. Hasselbeck won the final start of his career, an 18–12 win over the Miami Dolphins, thanks in large part to Frank Gore's two rushing touchdowns. He and backup Charlie Whitehurst were unable to play the season finale due to injury; to take their place the Colts signed Josh Freeman and Ryan Lindley, who subsequently split time in a 30–24 win over the Titans. Overall, Hasselbeck was responsible for five of the Colts' eight wins over the season, despite only starting eight games.

=== Retirement ===
On February 28, 2016, it was reported that Hasselbeck would not return to the Colts. On March 9, 2016, Hasselbeck announced his retirement from professional football, and that he would join his brother Tim and become an analyst for ESPN, replacing Mike Ditka on Sunday NFL Countdown. Hasselbeck signed a one-day contract with the Seattle Seahawks to officially retire as part of their organization.

Hasselbeck was laid off with other ESPN analysts on July 30, 2023.

== Career statistics ==
Legend
**Bold**	Career high

=== NFL ===
==== Regular season ====
Year	Team	Games			Passing								Rushing				Sacks		Fumbles	
Year	Team	GP	GS	Record	Cmp	Att	Pct	Yds	Avg	TD	Int	Rtg	Att	Yds	Avg	TD	Sck	SckY	Fum	Lost
1998	GB	0	0	Did not play																
1999	GB	16	0	—	3	10	30.0	41	4.1	1	0	77.5	6	15	2.5	0	1	9	1	0
2000	GB	16	0	—	10	19	52.6	104	5.5	1	0	86.3	4	−5	−1.3	0	1	2	0	0
2001	SEA	13	12	5–7	176	321	54.8	2,023	6.3	7	8	70.9	**40**	141	3.5	0	38	**251**	6	2
2002	SEA	16	10	5–5	267	419	63.7	3,075	7.3	15	10	87.8	**40**	**202**	5.1	1	26	143	5	4
2003	SEA	16	16	10–6	313	513	61.0	3,841	7.5	26	15	88.8	36	125	3.5	2	**42**	246	4	1
2004	SEA	14	14	7–7	279	474	58.9	3,382	7.1	22	15	83.1	27	90	3.3	1	30	155	5	1
2005	SEA	16	16	**13–3**	294	449	65.5	3,459	7.7	24	9	98.2	36	124	3.4	1	24	154	4	2
2006	SEA	12	12	7–5	210	371	56.6	2,442	6.6	18	15	76.0	18	110	6.1	0	34	229	3	2
2007	SEA	16	16	10–6	**352**	**562**	62.6	**3,966**	7.1	**28**	12	91.4	39	89	2.3	0	33	204	9	**5**
2008	SEA	7	7	1–6	109	209	52.2	1,216	5.8	5	10	57.8	11	69	**6.3**	0	19	119	1	0
2009	SEA	14	14	5–9	293	488	60.0	3,029	6.2	17	**17**	75.1	26	119	4.6	0	32	209	**11**	3
2010	SEA	14	14	6–8	266	444	59.9	3,001	6.8	12	**17**	73.2	23	60	2.6	**3**	29	175	7	**5**
2011	TEN	16	16	9–7	319	518	61.6	3,571	6.9	18	14	82.4	20	52	2.6	0	19	153	4	1
2012	TEN	8	5	2–3	138	221	62.4	1,367	6.2	7	5	81.0	13	38	2.9	0	14	103	3	1
2013	IND	3	0	—	7	12	58.3	130	**10.8**	0	1	61.1	2	−2	−1.0	0	0	0	0	0
2014	IND	4	0	—	30	44	**68.2**	301	6.8	2	0	**102.6**	8	−11	−1.4	0	2	7	1	1
2015	IND	8	8	5–3	156	256	60.9	1,690	6.6	9	5	84.0	16	15	0.9	0	16	101	3	2
Career		209	160	85–75	3,222	5,330	60.5	36,638	6.9	212	153	82.4	365	1,231	3.4	8	360	2,260	67	30

==== Postseason ====
Year	Team	Games			Passing								Rushing				Sacks		Fumbles	
Year	Team	GP	GS	Record	Cmp	Att	Pct	Yds	Avg	TD	Int	Rtg	Att	Yds	Avg	TD	Sck	SckY	Fum	Lost
2003	SEA	1	1	0–1	25	45	55.6	305	6.8	0	1	67.4	0	0	0.0	0	2	14	1	0
2004	SEA	1	1	0–1	27	43	**62.8**	341	**7.9**	2	1	93.3	2	26	**13.0**	0	3	9	0	0
2005	SEA	3	3	**2–1**	**62**	**103**	60.2	**707**	6.9	4	1	89.7	**15**	**83**	5.5	**1**	**5**	**30**	0	0
2006	SEA	2	2	1–1	36	69	52.2	435	6.3	3	**3**	68.2	3	11	3.7	0	3	16	0	0
2007	SEA	2	2	1–1	39	65	60.0	423	6.5	2	2	76.6	3	0	0.0	0	3	24	**2**	0
2010	SEA	2	2	1–1	47	81	59.3	530	6.5	**7**	1	**102.4**	2	−1	−0.5	0	3	22	1	0
2013	IND	0	0	Did not play																
2014	IND	3	0	—	0	0	0	0	0	0	0	0	0	0	0	0	0	0	0	0
Career		14	11	5–6	236	406	58.4	2,741	6.8	18	9	84.4	25	51	2.0	1	19	115	4	0

=== College ===
Season	Team	GP	Passing						
Season	Team	GP	Cmp	Att	Pct	Yds	TD	Int	Rtg
1994	Boston College	5	4	6	**66.7**	39	0	0	121.3
1995	Boston College	11	27	60	45.0	280	2	7	71.9
1996	Boston College	11	171	**330**	51.8	1,990	9	9	106.0
1997	Boston College	11	**188**	305	61.6	**2,239**	**11**	**10**	**128.6**
Totals		37	390	701	55.6	4,548	22	26	113.1

== Career highlights ==
=== Awards and honors ===
- 3× Pro Bowl (2003, 2005, 2007)
- NFC champion (2005)
- Nils V. "Swede" Nelson Award (1997)
- Steve Largent Award (2009)
- Seattle Seahawks 35th Anniversary team
- Seattle Seahawks Top 50 players
- Seattle Seahawks Ring of Honor
- NFC Offensive Player of the Month (December 2004)
- 2× NFC Offensive Player of the Week (Week 12, 2002; Week 5, 2005)

=== Seahawks franchise records ===
==== Regular season ====
- Most pass completions, game – 39 (vs Detroit, November 8, 2009)
- Most passing touchdowns, game (tied with three players): 5
- Most 4th quarter comeback wins in a single season – 4 (2006) (tied with Russell Wilson and Dave Krieg)
- Most game-winning drives in a single season – 5 (2006) (tied with Russell Wilson and Dave Krieg)

==== Playoffs ====
- Most consecutive passes without an interception – 109 (2004–05)
- Most touchdown passes in a single game – 4 (January 8, 2011, vs. Saints)

== Personal life ==
Hasselbeck is married to Sarah Egnaczyk. They met at age 17. Sarah was an athlete at Boston College, playing with the field hockey team. Together they live in Weston, Massachusetts, and have two daughters, Annabelle (born 2001) and Mallory (born 2003), and one son, Henry (born 2005). Annabelle and Mallory both play women's lacrosse at Boston College, while Henry is a quarterback who currently plays for Appalachian State.

Matt and his wife have both been struck by lightning. Matt was struck in 1996.

He is a born again Christian and participates in online Bible studies with former teammates and current players.

He is the brother-in-law of television personality Elisabeth Hasselbeck, who is married to his younger brother Tim. Tim also played quarterback at Boston College and in the NFL. He now works for ESPN.

Hasselbeck was inducted into the Seattle Seahawks Ring of Honor on October 25, 2021.
