= Bob Walsh (sports executive) =

American television director (1940–2017)

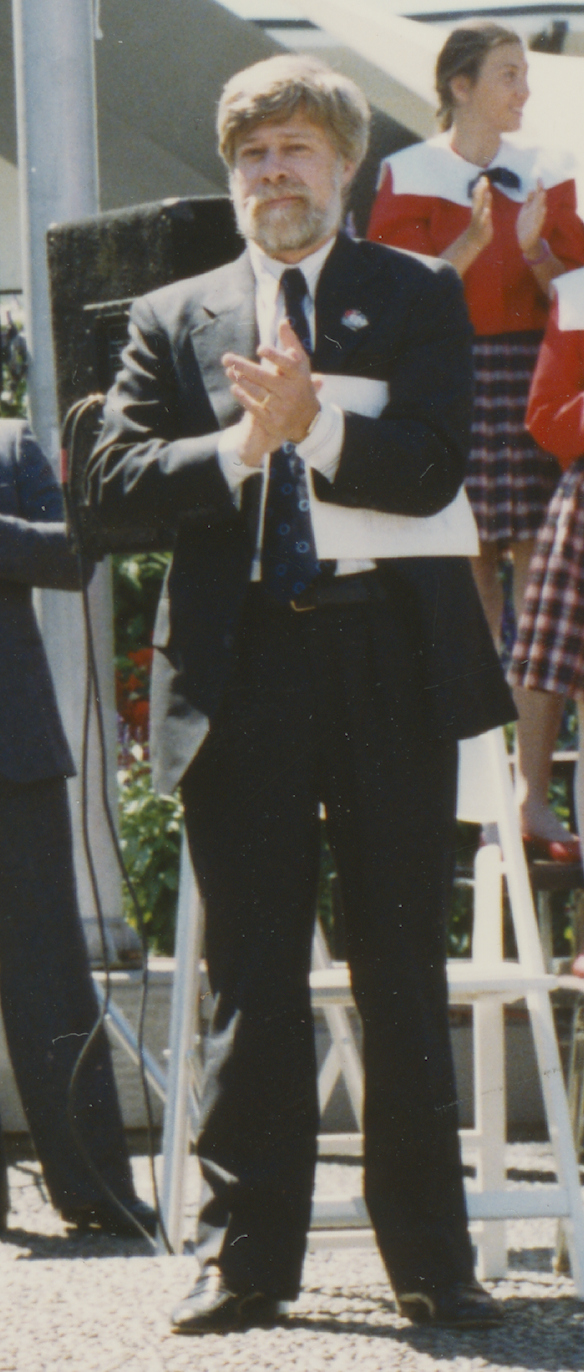
Bob Walsh at the 1990 Goodwill Games

Robert Walsh (September 20, 1940 – January 23, 2017) was an American television producer, marketing executive, sports executive, business consultant, and humanitarian.

== Early life ==
Walsh was born on September 20, 1940, in Winthrop, Massachusetts. He attended Marietta College, graduating in 1962 with a degree in radio, television and journalism.

== Career ==
Walsh was a television director and cameraman at WTAP-TV in Parkersburg, West Virginia, from 1961 to 1963. He was Program Director of WNAC in Boston from 1963 to 1967. He was a producer of the Al Capp syndicated television show (RKO General) and Program Director of KABC Radio in Los Angeles from 1967 to 1973. At KABC he programmed shows hosted by Regis Philbin, Patty Morrow (Peyton Place), Mr. Blackwell, Keith Jackson, David Cassidy, Marv Gray, Bob Arthur, Army Archerd, Robert Vaughn (Man from U.N.C.L.E.) and Maureen Reagan and guest regulars William Shatner, Merlin Olson and Jim Drury (The Virginian). In 1971 he hired journalist Joe Ortiz, the first Mexican American to host an English-language talk show on a commercial radio station. He also hired NBA player Bill Russell to host a two-hour talk show. Two years later, when Russell left Los Angeles to become coach and general manager of the Seattle SuperSonics, he brought Walsh with him as assistant general manager. Walsh stayed with the team until 1976.

In 1976, Walsh began to represent professional athletes, including Matt Millen, Jim Zorn, Steve Largent, Steve Raible, Sam McCullum, Mike Guman and Ray Horton of the NFL. He handled marketing for coaches Lenny Wilkens, Bill Russell and Jack Ramsay, movie producer Stanley Kramer, and Olympic gold medalists Tracie Ruiz (synchronized swimming) and Olga Korbut of the Soviet Union (gymnastics).

Walsh has produced many major sporting events, the NCAA credits him with starting the March Madness celebration in 1984 in Seattle when he was executive director of the Final Four Host Committee. He also served as executive director of 1989 NCAA Men's Final Four; 1988 and 1989 Women's Final Four; 1987 NBA All-Star Game; and 1987 and 1988 NCAA West Regionals (basketball). His company, Bob Walsh Enterprises, was responsible for the 1995 successful bid for the Vancouver Grizzlies franchise in the National Basketball Association.

He was an employee of Ross Shafer Consultants, an international consulting and speaking organization that helps corporations.

Walsh was involved in OneWorld Now!, a non-profit organization uniting unemployed youth (15–25) with businesses worldwide.

== Humanitarian efforts ==
Walsh is probably best known for his international diplomatic and humanitarian efforts.

=== Goodwill Games ===
He worked with TBS founder Ted Turner and the Ministry of Radio and Television (Gosteleradio) and the Ministry of Sports (Goskomsport) of the Soviet Union during the Cold War to produce the 1990 Goodwill Games, which Turner started in 1986 because of the boycotts of the 1980 and 1984 Olympics. The summer-long Games, held in Seattle and the U.S. northwest region, included 54 countries and 23 sports. It also presented a major arts and cultural program, which included the Bolshoi Ballet, Moscow Circus, combined Moscow-Seattle Opera's presentation of War and Peace, and combined USSR and Seattle Symphony presentation. About 2,000 citizens of the Soviet Union lived in homes with Americans through a Rotary International program. Turner and Soviet television broadcast the event in the U.S. and throughout the Soviet Union. The Goodwill Games was the largest exchange between the United States and the USSR.

=== Other ===
In 1991, he worked with Russian entrepreneurs and cosmonauts to launch a capsule on a Soyuz rocket from the Plesetsk Cosmodrome in Russian into orbit for seven days. The capsule landed off the coast of Washington and now sits in the Boeing Museum of Flight. The mission is believed to be the first commercial space flight.

Walsh also worked in humanitarian activities in Belarus, Russia and the Republic of Georgia during and after the Cold War. He brought dozens of young people to the United States for major medical operations. He brought the first major Western investment to Georgia, resulting in the development of the Marriott Tbilisi Hotel, Marriott Courtyard, office buildings, and an ice cream factory in Tbilisi, the Georgian capital. He directed the first Western relief efforts at the request of Soviet General Secretary Gorbachev after the 1988 Armenian earthquake, the first time American citizens and aircraft were allowed behind the Iron Curtain without visas since World War II. He negotiated with USSR Minister of Sports Marat Gramov and Deputy Minister Alexander Kozlovsky for the historic swim of the Bering Strait by cold-water swimmer Lynne Cox in 1987 and the Earth Day 20 International Peace Climb of Mt. Everest by Chinese, Soviet, and American climbers led by Jim Whittaker.

== Awards and memberships ==
Walsh received the Supreme Soviet Award from the Chairman of the USSR for his humanitarian activities during the Cold War and was named an "Honorary Citizen of the Republic of Georgia" by former President Eduard Shevardnadze. He also received the World Affairs Council award in 1990, Washington Man of the Year Award; Marietta College Distinguished Alumnus Award; and the "Abe Lincoln Award" for producing a groundbreaking 24-hour broadcast on "Homosexuality" on ABC Radio.

He has served as chairman of the board of the Russian American Foundation for Economic Cooperation; as a Board Member of the Sugar Ray Robinson Youth Foundation; is Founding Chairman and current member of the Board of One World Now; was a member of the Pasadena Tournament of Roses Committee, and Chairman of the Board of the Seattle Convention and Visitors Bureau. He has been credited with the successful marketing of the "Emerald City" nickname for Seattle.

== Death ==
Walsh died on January 23, 2017 in Istanbul, Turkey following a respiratory infection contracted while traveling in Tbilisi, Georgia.

== Sources ==
- Broom, Jack; Keene, Linda; Balter, Joni (August 5, 1990). "Sharing The Moment -- The Legacy Of The Games -- Intangible Benefits May Be More Meaningful Than Physical Facilities". Seattle Times.* Rudman, Steve (2001). Who the Hell is Bob?. Hara Publishing. ISBN 978-1-883697-70-9. pages 59–60; 61-70.
- Cox, Lynne (2004). Swimming to Antarctica. Harcourt. ISBN 9780156031301.
- Hubbard, Kim (August 24, 1987). "Lynne Cox's Brave Swim Across the Frigid Bering Strait Breaks the Ice with the Russians". People. 28 (8).
- Miller, Julie (2010). Secrets of Self-Starters. Book Publishers Network. ISBN 978-1-935359-51-7.
- Smith, Sarah (July 8, 1990). "Tireless And Tenacious -- Bob Walsh Is Behind The Biggest U.S.-Soviet Cultural Exchange In History, But It Has Taken Time To Win Respect In His Own City". Seattle Times.
- Vaughn, Robert (2008). A Fortunate Life. Macmillan. ISBN 978-0-312-37112-8. Pages 252, 253
- Wilhelm, Steve (July 12, 1998). "Bob Walsh partners with former Soviet dairy plant". Puget Sound Business Journal.
