= KYAK =

Coordinates: 46°36′48″N 120°28′57″W

- Yakima, Washington; United States
- Frequency: 930 kHz
- Branding: American Christian Network

Programming
- Format: Christian radio
- Affiliations: American Christian Network

Ownership
- Owner: Thomas W. Read
- Sister stations: KTBI, KGDN

History
- First air date: October 17, 1962
- Former call signs: KQOT (1962–1979); KVGM (1979–1984); KBNG (1984–1985); KAJR (1985–1986); KZTA (1986–1987); KAJR (1987); KZTA (1987–1996); KJOX (1996–1997); KGER (1997–1998)
- Former frequencies: 940 kHz (1962–1966)

Technical information
- Licensing authority: FCC
- Facility ID: 36030
- Class: D
- Power: 10,000 watts (day); 127 watts (night)
- Translator: 96.1 K241CV (Yakima)

Links
- Public license information: Public file; LMS
- Website: kyak.com

KYAK is a Christian radio station licensed to Yakima, Washington, broadcasting on 930 AM. The station is owned by Thomas W. Read.

== History ==
The station began broadcasting October 17, 1962, holding the call sign KQOT, and originally broadcast at 940 kHz. In 1966, the station's frequency was changed to 930 kHz. The station aired a rock format in the 1970s. In 1979, the station's call sign was changed to KVGM, and it adopted a MOR format.

In 1984, the station's call sign was changed to KBNG. In 1985, its call sign was changed to KAJR. In 1986, the station's call sign was changed to KZTA. In February 1987, the station's call sign was changed back to KAJR, but was changed back to KZTA in June 1987. As KZTA, the station aired a Spanish language format.

In February 1996, the station's call sign was changed to KJOX, and it adopted a sports radio format, branded "Jocks 930". In November 1997, the station's call sign was changed to KGER, and it adopted a religious format. In June 1998, the station's call sign was changed to KYAK, with the station continuing to air a religious format.

A license was granted on July 24, 2019, for KYAK to operate an FM translator on 96.1 mHz, K241CV. The translator went on shortly after. K241CV operates with a power of 180 watts, with strong coverage throughout the Yakima Valley.
