= Seattle Seahawks Ring of Honor =

Group of people honored for contributing to the Seattle Seahawks

Coordinates: 47.59521°N 122.33091°W

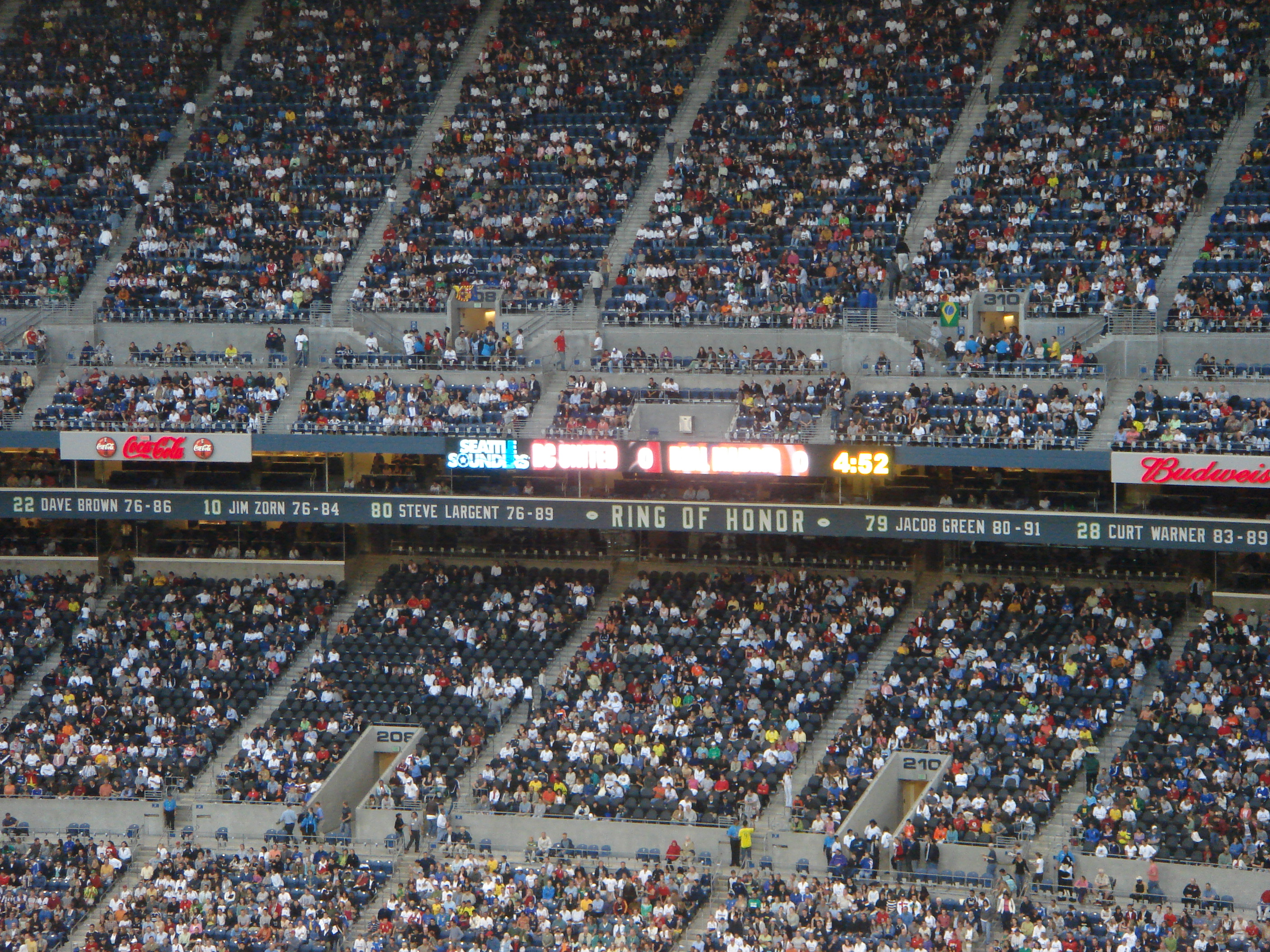
Taken in 2006.

The Seattle Seahawks Ring of Honor is a group of people honored for their contributions to the Seattle Seahawks, a professional football team in the National Football League.

== Key ==
| Inducted | Year officially inducted |
| Name | Name of inductee |
| Position | Player position or other role of inductee |
| Years | Years with the Seahawks |
| No. | Jersey number with Seahawks (players only) |
| | Member of Pro Football Hall of Fame |
| | Number retired by the Seahawks |

== Ring of Honor inductees ==
Seattle Seahawks Ring of Honor
| Inducted | No. | Name | Position | Tenure | Ref. |
| 1989 | 80 | Steve Largent | WR | 1976–1989 | |
| 1991 | 10 | Jim Zorn | QB | 1976–1984 | |
| 1992 | 22 | Dave Brown | CB | 1976–1986 | |
| 1992 | — | Pete Gross | Radio announcer | 1976–1992 | |
| 1994 | 28 | Curt Warner | RB | 1983–1989 | |
| 1995 | 79 | Jacob Green | DE | 1980–1991 | |
| 2002 | 45 | Kenny Easley | SS | 1981–1987 | |
| 2004 | 17 | Dave Krieg | QB | 1980–1991 | |
| 2005 | — | Chuck Knox | Head coach | 1983–1991 | |
| 2006 | 96 | Cortez Kennedy | DT | 1990–2000 | |
| 2014 | 71 | Walter Jones | OT | 1997–2009 | |
| 2019 | — | Paul Allen | Owner | 1996–2018 | (Note: Inducted posthumously.) |
| 2021 | 8 | Matt Hasselbeck | QB | 2001–2010 | |
| 2021 | — | Mike Holmgren | Head coach | 1999–2008 | |
| 2022 | 37 | Shaun Alexander | RB | 2000–2007 | |
