= Don Heinrich =

American football player, coach, and announcer (1930–1992)

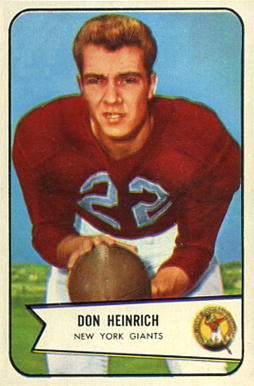
- 1954 Bowman football card

No. 11
- Position: Quarterback

Personal information
- Born: September 19, 1930; Chicago, Illinois, U.S.
- Died: February 29, 1992 (aged 61); Saratoga, California, U.S.
- Listed height: 6 ft 0 in (1.83 m)
- Listed weight: 182 lb (83 kg)

Career information
- High school: Bremerton (WA)
- College: Washington (1948–1952)
- NFL draft: 1952: 3rd round, 35th overall pick

Career history

Playing
- New York Giants (1954–1959); Dallas Cowboys (1960); Oakland Raiders (1962)

Coaching
- New York Giants (1961) Backfield coach; Los Angeles Rams (1963) Offensive backs coach; Pittsburgh Steelers (1966–1968) Offensive backs coach; New Orleans Saints (1969–1970) Offensive backs coach; San Francisco 49ers (1971–1973) Defensive backs coach; San Francisco 49ers (1974–1975) Passing / receiving coach

Awards and highlights
- NFL champion (1956); NCAA passing yards leader (1950); 2× First-team All-American (1950, 1952); 2× All-Pacific Coast (1950, 1952)

Career NFL/AFL statistics
- Passing attempts: 406
- Passing completions: 164
- Completion percentage: 40.4%
- TD–INT: 17–23
- Passing yards: 2,287
- Passer rating: 49.6
- Stats at Pro Football Reference
- College Football Hall of Fame

Donald Alan Heinrich (September 19, 1930 – February 29, 1992) was an American professional football player, coach, and announcer. He played professionally as a quarterback in National Football League (NFL) for the New York Giants and Dallas Cowboys. He also was a member of the Oakland Raiders in the American Football League (AFL). Heinrich played college football at the University of Washington.

== Early life ==
Born in Chicago, Heinrich was raised in Western Washington and graduated from Bremerton High School, west of Seattle, in 1948. As a senior in the fall of 1947, he led the Wildcats to the mythical state title. That winter, he contributed to the basketball team finishing in second-place at state.

== College career ==
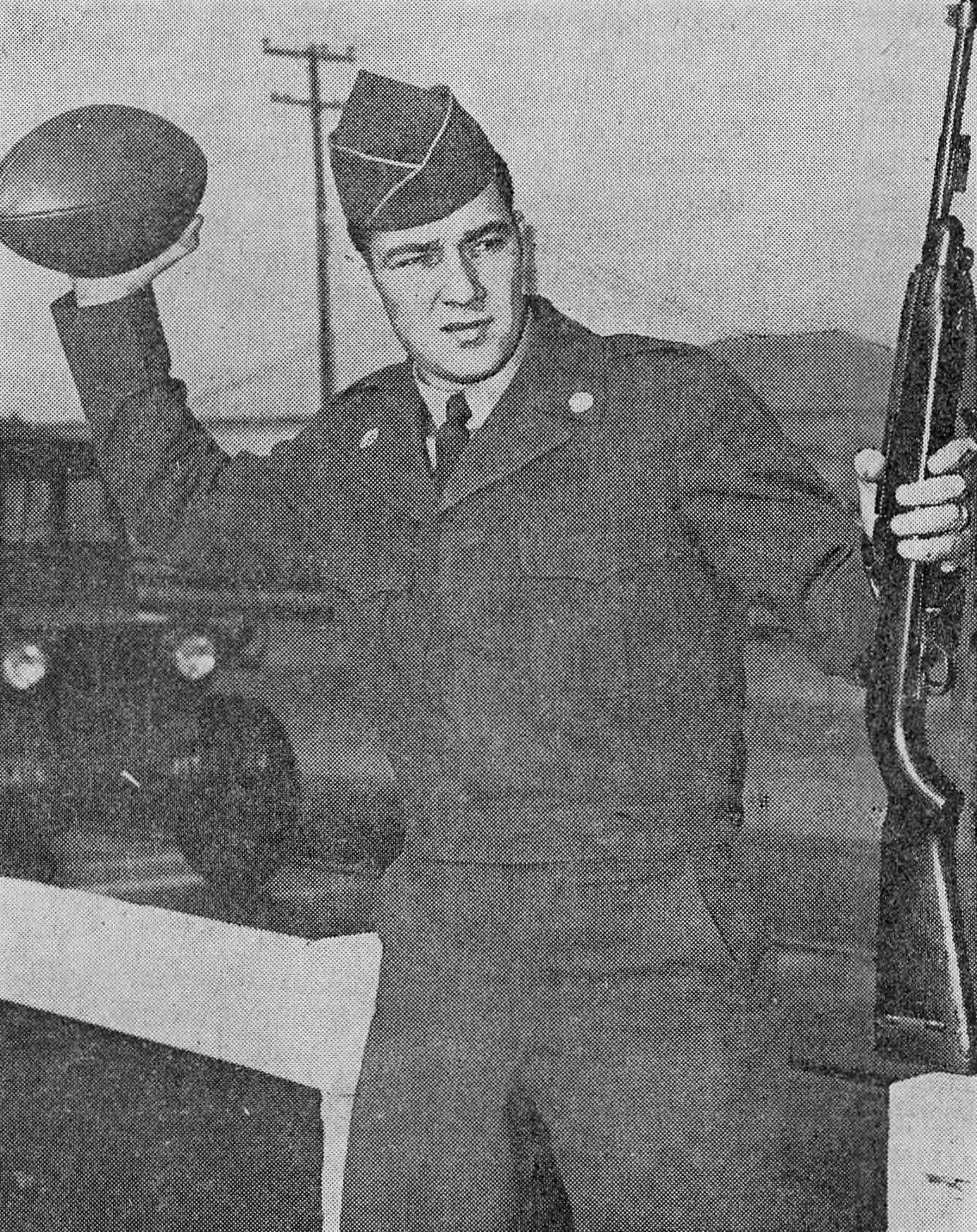
Heinrich served in the U.S. Army from 1952 to 1953.

Heinrich played quarterback at Washington in Seattle, leading the nation in passing in 1950 and 1952, and setting many of the school's passing records. His 60.9 completion percentage in 1950 set an NCAA record. Heinrich missed the 1951 season due to a pre-season shoulder separation, and was selected in the third round of the 1952 NFL draft, but stayed in college and played his fifth-year senior season with the Huskies in 1952.

He was inducted into the U.S. Army that November, prior to the Apple Cup in Spokane against Washington State, but was granted a pass to play. The Cougars had won the previous year in Husky Stadium while Heinrich was sidelined, but he led the Huskies to a 33–27 victory in 1952, and finished 3–0 in his career against WSC.

Heinrich played two seasons (1949, 1950) with hall of fame running back Hugh McElhenny. They were expected to play together for three, but Heinrich's shoulder injury put junior Sam Mitchell and sophomore Dean Rockey at quarterback in 1951; after three wins in their first four games, Washington went winless and fell to 3–6–1.

== Professional career ==
=== New York Giants ===
Heinrich was selected by the New York Giants in the third round (35th overall) of the 1952 NFL draft with a future draft pick, which allowed the team to draft him before his college eligibility was over.

He served in the military for just under two years, and also got a chance to play football for Fort Ord. He missed the 1953 season and reported to the Giants in 1954. While in the army, he played for the Fort Ord Warriors, which included running back Ollie Matson.

In his six seasons with the Giants, he saw action in three NFL championship games (1956, 1958, 1959), while being the starting quarterback of the 1956 title team. With Vince Lombardi as the Giants' offensive coordinator (1954–58), Heinrich split time at quarterback with Charlie Conerly, with him being used to probe defenses and Conerly coming into the games to capitalize on weaknesses.

=== Dallas Cowboys ===
Heinrich was selected by the Dallas Cowboys in the 1960 expansion draft. He reunited with head coach Tom Landry, who was the defensive coordinator with the Giants. Heinrich again shared time at quarterback, with veteran Eddie LeBaron and rookie Don Meredith.

=== Oakland Raiders ===
On July 9, 1962, he returned as a player after the American Football League Oakland Raiders bought his rights from the NFL's Cowboys. The Raiders needed quarterback depth after learning that the previous year's No. 1 draft choice, Tom Flores, would miss the season due to a lung infection.

== Coaching career ==
In 1961, Heinrich returned to the Giants as a backfield coach under newly promoted head coach Allie Sherman. From 1963 to 1964, he was the backfield coach for the Los Angeles Rams, under former Giants teammate Harland Svare. In 1965, he was hired as a scout for the expansion Atlanta Falcons.

From 1966 to 1968, he was the assistant for offense and called the plays for the Pittsburgh Steelers under former Giants teammate Bill Austin. From 1969 to 1970, he was the backfield coach for the New Orleans Saints under Tom Fears. From 1971 to 1975, he began as the defensive backfield coach before being moved to the passing-receiving coach for the San Francisco 49ers under Dick Nolan.

== Broadcasting career ==
In 1976, Heinrich began his broadcasting career, working first on Washington Huskies games and also as the first radio game analyst for the Seattle Seahawks Radio Network (working with Pete Gross and Wayne Cody) and then becoming an analyst for the 49ers' games. In 1983 and 1984, Heinrich was a color analyst for ESPN and ABC broadcasts of the United States Football League (USFL).

Heinrich worked with Preview Sports Publications, with whom he published the magazines Don Heinrich's College Football and Don Heinrich's Pro Preview, until his death. In 1991, he was the analyst for Pac-10 games on Prime Ticket, a cable channel based in Los Angeles.

== Honors and death ==
In 1974, he was inducted into the State of Washington Sports Hall of Fame. In 1981, he was inducted into the Husky Hall of Fame. In 1987, he was inducted into the College Football Hall of Fame. In 1990, he was named the starting quarterback on Washington's Centennial Team.

Heinrich was diagnosed with pancreatic cancer in June 1991, and died at age 61 at his home in Saratoga, California.

== See also ==
- List of American Football League players
- List of college football yearly passing leaders
