= Opportunity, Washington =

- Locale
- Location of Opportunity, Washington
- Coordinates: 47°38′49″N 117°14′28″W
- Country: United States
- State: Washington
- County: Spokane

Area
  - Total: 6.7 sq mi (17.3 km^{2})
  - Land: 6.7 sq mi (17.3 km^{2})
  - Water: 0 sq mi (0.0 km^{2})
- Elevation: 2,005 ft (611 m)

Population (2000)
  - Total: 25,065
  - Density: 3,747/sq mi (1,446.6/km^{2})
- Time zone: UTC-8 (Pacific (PST))
  - Summer (DST): UTC-7 (PDT)
- FIPS code: 53-51515 http://www.city-data.com/city/Opportunity-Washington.html#top
- GNIS feature ID: 1512530

Opportunity is a locale and former census-designated place in Spokane County, Washington, United States. The population was 25,065 at the 2000 census.

== History ==
The name Opportunity was selected in 1905 as the winning entry in a naming contest. The area has been a city neighborhood of Spokane Valley since the city incorporated in 2003.

== Geography ==
Opportunity is located at 47°38′49″N 117°14′28″W (47.646994, -117.241064).

According to the United States Census Bureau, the CDP has a total area of 6.7 square miles (17 km^{2}), all land.

== Demographics ==
Historical population
Census	Pop.	Note	%±
1910	1,928		—
1920	3,278		70.0%
1930	5,280		61.1%
1940	7,342		39.1%
1950	14,240		94.0%
1960	12,465		−12.5%
1970	16,604		33.2%
1980	21,241		27.9%
1990	22,236		4.7%
2000	25,065		12.7%
U.S. Census

As of the census of 2000, there were 25,065 people, 10,242 households, http://www.city-data.com/city/Opportunity-Washington.html#top and 6,667 families residing in the CDP. The population density was 3,746.8 per square mile (1,446.6/km^{2}). There were 10,827 housing units at an average density of 1,618.5 per square mile (624.9/km^{2}). The racial makeup of the CDP was 93.52% White, 1.01% African American, 1.01% Native American, 1.29% Asian, 0.10% Pacific Islander, 0.63% from other races, and 2.45% from two or more races. Hispanic or Latino of any race were 2.67% of the population.

There were 10,242 households, out of which 31.8% had children under the age of 18 living with them, 48.7% were married couples living together, 12.1% had a female householder with no husband present, and 34.9% were non-families. 28.8% of all households were made up of individuals, and 11.1% had someone living alone who was 65 years of age or older. The average household size was 2.42 and the average family size was 2.95.

In the CDP, the age distribution of the population shows 25.7% under the age of 18, 9.8% from 18 to 24, 27.9% from 25 to 44, 21.8% from 45 to 64, and 14.8% who were 65 years of age or older. The median age was 36 years. For every 100 females, there were 91.5 males. For every 100 females age 18 and over, there were 87.4 males.

The median income for a household in the CDP was $38,658, and the median income for a family was $44,230. Males had a median income of $35,435 versus $25,860 for females. The per capita income for the CDP was $18,116. About 6.3% of families and 9.0% of the population were below the poverty line, including 10.7% of those under age 18 and 6.2% of those age 65 or over.
