= Steve Raible =

American football player and analyst (born 1954)

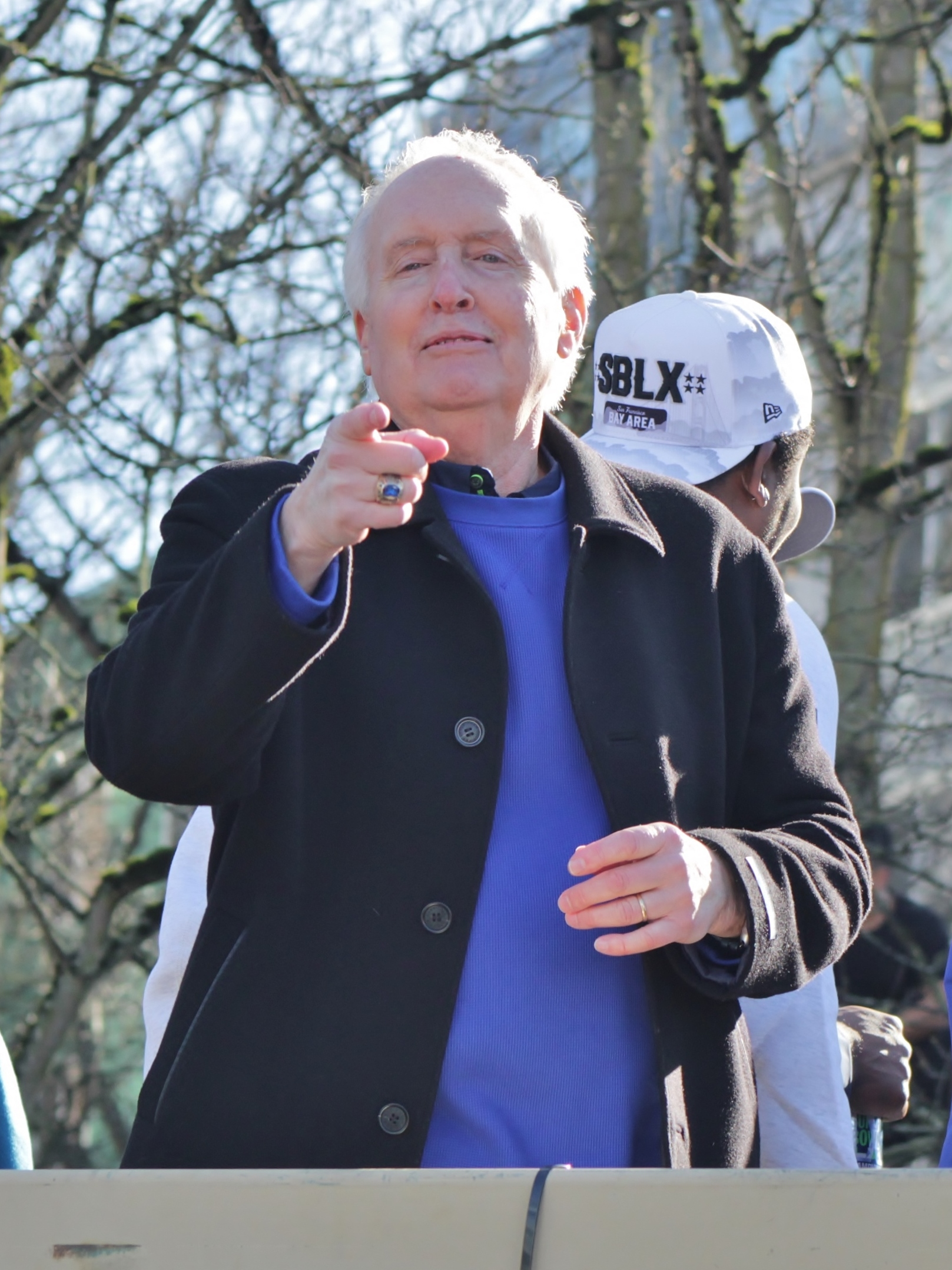
- Raible in 2026

No. 83
- Position: Wide receiver

Personal information
- Born: June 2, 1954 (age 72); Louisville, Kentucky, U.S.
- Listed height: 6 ft 2 in (1.88 m)
- Listed weight: 195 lb (88 kg)

Career information
- High school: Louisville (KY) Trinity
- College: Georgia Tech
- NFL draft: 1976: 2nd round, 59th overall pick

Career history
- Seattle Seahawks (1976–1981)

Awards and highlights
- State of Washington Sports Hall of Fame

Career NFL statistics
- Receptions: 68
- Receiving yards: 1,017
- Touchdowns: 3
- Stats at Pro Football Reference

Steven Carl Raible (born June 2, 1954) is the play-by-play radio broadcaster for the Seattle Seahawks of the National Football League (NFL), and was a weeknight news anchor for KIRO 7 in Seattle, Washington, until his retirement in 2020. He was a wide receiver for the Seahawks for their first six seasons.

== Early life ==
Born and raised in Louisville, Kentucky, Raible graduated from Trinity High School in 1972 (and was its first alumnus to play pro football). He played college football for Georgia Tech in Atlanta, as a tight end and wide receiver in the wishbone offense under head coach Pepper Rodgers.

== Pro football ==
An original member of the expansion Seattle Seahawks, Raible was a second round selection in the 1976 NFL draft (59th overall). He played wide receiver for six seasons, from 1976 to 1981, all under head coach Jack Patera.

In his final season, Raible incurred a collapsed lung in the second preseason game in mid-August, and did not play again for nearly two months, until the sixth game of the regular season. He dropped on the depth chart and caught just one pass during the 1981 season.

As a receiver with the Seahawks, Raible wore #83 and was often jovially referred to as "the other Steve", much less celebrated than hall of fame teammate Steve Largent.

=== Career statistics ===
Year	Team	G	GS	Rec	Yards	Y/R	TDs
1976	SEA	13	1	4	126	31.5	1
1977	SEA	14	3	3	79	26.3	0
1978	SEA	16	0	22	316	14.4	1
1979	SEA	16	3	20	252	12.6	1
1980	SEA	16	0	16	232	14.5	0
1981	SEA	9	0	1	12	12.0	0
Career		84	7	68	1017	15.0	3

== Broadcasting ==
During his playing career, Raible did broadcasting and public appearance work during the off season. While preparing for his seventh NFL season, Raible was offered an opportunity in June 1982 to be the color analyst for the Seahawks radio broadcasts with Pete Gross on KIRO radio; he accepted and retired from playing at age 28. He also became a sports reporter at KIRO-TV in Seattle, and later shared duties as one of its news anchors.

After 22 seasons in the analyst role, Raible became the lead play-by-play radio announcer for the Seahawks (the "Voice of the Seahawks") in 2004 on flagship stations KIRO-AM 710 ESPN Seattle and KIRO Radio 97.3 FM, where his catchphrases include "Are you kidding me?!" and "Holy catfish!" He is teamed with former Seahawks linebacker Dave Wyman, the current color commentator. He is one of the few people to have been associated with the Seahawks franchise in every year of its existence.

Raible also hosted the television coverage of the Seafair hydroplane races and Blue Angels airshow during the first weekend of August each year in Seattle. He shaved his famous mustache in March 2008 after KIRO-TV converted to a high definition news operation.

In his career as a news anchor, Raible received five Regional Emmy Awards, including two for "best anchor". He was a news anchor at KIRO-TV from 1993 until his retirement in 2020.

== Video ==
- NFL Films Presents: Steve Raible
