= KSPO (AM) =

- Dishman, Washington; United States
- Broadcast area: Spokane, Washington
- Frequency: 1050 kHz
- Branding: American Christian Network

Programming
- Format: Religious/Talk

Ownership
- Owner: Thomas W. Read; (Liberty Broadcasting System, LLC)
- Sister stations: KTRW

History
- First air date: 1984
- Former call signs: KSPO (1984-2001); KDRK (2001-2004); KEYF (2004-2016); KFIO (2016-2025)

Technical information
- Licensing authority: FCC
- Facility ID: 53148
- Class: B
- Power: 25,000 watts (day); 260 watts (night)
- Transmitter coordinates: 47°36′27″N 117°21′40″W
- Translator: 97.7 K249FF (Spokane)

Links
- Public license information: Public file; LMS

KSPO (1050 kHz) is an AM radio station licensed to Dishman, Washington and serves the greater Spokane media market. The station is owned by Thomas R. Read, through licensee Liberty Broadcasting System, LLC, and is the flagship for the American Christian Network.

The station broadcasts in the daytime at 25,000 watts but at night it must reduce power to 260 watts; that is because 1050 kHz is assigned as a clear channel frequency reserved for Mexico, so it cannot use a higher power that might interfere with Mexican radio stations.

== History ==
KSPO first signed on in 1984. Tom and Melinda Read purchased the tower and property of the former KPEG on Crestline on Spokane's South Hill. In an interview with the Northwest Pioneer Broadcasters, Tom Read said he purchased the radio station building for his production and tape duplicating facility. Every morning he came to work and looked at the AM tower on the property and thought that the tower should be put to use. He phoned George Frese, then a consulting broadcast engineer, and asked him to conduct an AM allocation study for a new AM station for Spokane. Tom further asked George to see why 1050 would not work as it had been assigned to nearby Coeur d'Alene, Idaho but that station had been deleted. Frese study confirmed that 1050 AM was used by some Canadian station but was available for Spokane with 5,000 watts, daytime. The original call letters were KSPO. KSPO 1050 AM became Spokane's premier religious-programmed station.

Years later, KSPO 1050 was sold by Read in order to increase power of his Central Washington station, KTBI, to 50,000 watts on 810 kHz. The FCC rules at the time did not allow one owner to control two AM stations which overlapped. In his book, Read explained that KTBI was a grandfathered type of facility and if it did not increase power to the maximum allow at the time, it would most likely never be able to do so. For that reason, he reluctantly sold KSPO 1050.

The station went through a large number of owners through the years. Read repurchased the Crestline transmitter property and studio building after the 1050 facility was moved to another transmitter location. Finally, Mapleton was the owner of the 1050 and approached Read about purchasing the license and moving the transmitter back to its original Crestline tower where it remain today.

With the KSPO call letters used by Read on 106.5 FM in Spokane, some thought was given to using the KSPO AM and FM combination with the 1050. However, to pay honor to the original KFIO, the first licensed radio station in Spokane, Read decided to use the KFIO callsign for the new 1050 AM station.

In January 2016, KEYF owner Mapleton Communications sold the frequency to Thomas Read, owner of Spokane religious stations KSPO and KTRW, who changed the call sign to KFIO in honor of the original KFIO (now KSBN), which was assigned these call letters from 1923 to 1950. On April 25, 2016, KEYF went silent to allow for the installation of a new 25,000–watt transmitter at the Crestline location. KFIO began equipment testing in October 2016 and returned to the airwaves later that year.

Date from the archives of the Northwest Pioneer Broadcasters and the draft of Tom Read's forthcoming book, "A Young Man With A Microphone".

On March 25, 2025, sister stations KSPO 106.5 (also licensed to Dishman) and KGDN 101.3 in Pasco were sold to the Educational Media Foundation (K-Love, Inc.) for $1.3 million. Ahead of the expected takeover, KFIO's owner Thomas Read filed to exchange the call letters on KFIO and sister station KSPO 106.5, effective on June 16.

== Repeaters ==
The American Christian Network can be heard on the following full-powered repeaters and broadcast translators:

American Christian Network
Call sign	Frequency	City of license	Broadcast Area
KGDN	93.9 FM	Ephrata, WA	Moses Lake
K241CV	96.1 FM	Yakima, WA	Yakima
K243CG	96.5 FM	Spokane, WA	Spokane
K249FF	97.7 FM	Spokane, WA	Spokane
K291CS	106.1 FM	Ephrata, WA	Moses Lake
KTRW (Note: Partial KSPO repeater, but part of ACN)	630 AM	Opportunity, WA	Spokane
KTBI	810 AM	Ephrata, WA	Moses Lake, Wenatchee, Tri-Cities
KYAK	930 AM	Yakima, WA	Yakima, Ellensburg
