= Pete Gross =

American sports announcer

- Born: December 28, 1936; San Francisco Bay Area, California, U.S.
- Died: December 2, 1992 (aged 55); Mercer Island, Washington, U.S.
- Sports commentary career
- Team: Seattle Seahawks

Peter R. Gross (December 28, 1936 – December 2, 1992) was an American sports announcer known in Seattle, Washington, as the "Voice of the Seahawks" for 17 years. He spent most of his career as a radio play-by-play announcer with KIRO (AM). His most memorable call line was "Touchdown Seahawks!"

Before announcing for the Seahawks, Gross called football and basketball play-by-play for the University of Washington in Seattle as well as for the University of the Pacific in Stockton, California. He was the play-by-play announcer on KIRO-TV Seattle SuperSonics telecasts from 1976 to 1978. The Seahawks inducted Gross into their Ring of Honor in 1992, attending the ceremony just two days before his death.

== Early years ==
Born and raised in the San Francisco Bay area, Gross graduated from Tamalpais High School in 1954. He attended the University of Southern California (USC) and graduated from the University of Miami, where he competed as a swimmer.

== Career ==
Gross began his career in sports broadcasting as high school play-by-play announcer in Watsonville, California. Later, he worked as a Top 40 disc jockey at KSRO Santa Rosa, KXOA Sacramento (using the on-air name "Tony King"), and KJOY Stockton. While in Sacramento, Gross also served as Director of Public Relations for the Sacramento Capitols of the Continental Football League, while also doing football play-by-play for American River College. At K-JOY Gross was play-by-play broadcaster for the University of the Pacific football and basketball. He later continued broadcasting sports on KIRO 710 Radio in Seattle in 1973, covering University of Washington football and basketball, and radio and TV broadcasting of the NBA SuperSonics.

When the expansion Seattle Seahawks began NFL preseason play in 1976, Gross became their play-by-play announcer, an assignment which eventually stretched out 17 years. His original broadcast partners on the Seahawks radio broadcasts were Don Heinrich and Wayne Cody. In addition, Gross covered Pac-10 basketball broadcasts for TCS/Metro and ESPN, color analysis for Philadelphia 76ers broadcasts, and color for the Mutual radio network's coverage of the NBA championships (1978).

Gross broadcast 331 Seahawks' games as the Voice of the Seahawks; in seventeen seasons, he called almost every game, only missing five games in 1992 due to cancer. In the 1983 season, Gross was in the broadcast booth as the Seahawks came within one game of the Super Bowl. His trademark call was "Touchdown, Seahawks!" Steve Raible, who served as color commentator with Gross for much of his 17 years, continues to call that line as the Seahawks play-by-play announcer today, a role he has served in since 2004.

== Death and legacy ==
Gross died of cancer in 1992 at age 55, two days after his entry into the team's Ring of Honor. The Fred Hutchinson Cancer Research Center created the Pete Gross House, a 69-unit housing complex that provides living space for families of patients undergoing treatment at the center, in his memory. Pete Gross House also houses an administrative office for the Seattle Cancer Care Alliance.

== Personal life ==
Gross was married with three daughters.
