= KLSN (FM) =

Religious radio station in Spokane, Washington

Coordinates: 47.694°N 117.335°W

- Dishman, Washington; United States
- Broadcast area: Spokane metropolitan area
- Frequency: 106.5 MHz
- Branding: K-Love

Programming
- Format: Contemporary Christian
- Affiliations: K-Love

Ownership
- Owner: Educational Media Foundation; (K-LOVE, Inc.)
- Sister stations: KTSL

History
- First air date: 1992 (as KWQL)
- Former call signs: KWQL (1990–1996); KSPO (1996-2025); KFIO (2025)

Technical information
- Licensing authority: FCC
- Facility ID: 31495
- Class: A
- ERP: 2,250 watts
- HAAT: 161 meters (528 ft)

Links
- Public license information: Public file; LMS
- Webcast: Listen Live
- Website: klove.com

KLSN (106.5 MHz) is an FM radio station licensed to Dishman, Washington, and serving the Spokane metropolitan area. It broadcasts a Contemporary Christian format. The station is currently owned by Educational Media Foundation. Before the K-Love format, it aired a Christian talk and teaching program affiliated with the American Christian Network.

== History ==
KSPO was an AM station from its inception in the late 1920s until becoming an FM station in 1992. The station was originally at 96.9 before moving to its current frequency in 1996.

On March 25, 2025, KSPO and KGDN in Pasco were sold to the Educational Media Foundation (K-Love, Inc.) for $1.3 million. Ahead of the expected takeover, KSPO's owner, Thomas Read, filed to exchange the call letters for KSPO and sister station KFIO 1050, effective June 16, while EMF filed to change the call letters for 106.5 to KLSN, effective June 30.

The station went silent and changed its call letters on June 30, then signed back on the next morning, carrying K-Love programming.
