= The King's Academy (West Palm Beach, Florida) =

School in Florida, US

Location
- 8401 Belvedere Road; West Palm Beach, Florida, 33411; United States of America; 26.6941°N 80.1815°W

Information
- Type: College Preparatory, Private
- Motto: Fiat Lux ("Let There be Light")
- Religious affiliation: Christian
- Established: 1970; 56 years ago
- President: Randal L. Martin
- Chairman: Steven T. Rasmussen
- Principals: Deborah Rantin (High Sch), John Raines (Middle Sch), Adam Miller (Elem Sch), Natasha Smith (Early Child)
- Headmaster: Douglas Raines
- Age: 2 to 18
- Enrollment: 1,925
- Colors: Red, White and Royal Blue
- Athletics: FHSAA
- Team name: Lions
- Accreditation: Cognia, ACSI
- Yearbook: The Sceptre
- Website: tka.net

The King's Academy is a three-time National Blue Ribbon, private Christian pre-K–12 college-preparatory school in West Palm Beach, Florida. Established in 1970, it is run by an independent board of governors. The King’s Academy’s mission is to assist the home and church in their endeavor to "train up a child in the way he (she) should go” (Proverbs 22:6), sharing salvation through Jesus Christ and graduating Christian leaders who seek to impact their world for the King of kings through academic excellence and spiritual vitality.

== History ==
The King's Academy was founded by a group of Christian business leaders and pastor and theologian C. Ernest Tatham in August 1970 and opened on the campus of Belvedere Baptist Church in West Palm Beach, Florida. In 1971, the school purchased a 20-acre campus on Cherry Road where it remained until the 2004 school year. In August 2005, The King's Academy moved to its current location, 65 acres at Belvedere Road and Sansbury's Way in Palm Beach County, Florida.

Since 1970, four presidents have overseen the daily operations of the school:

- Kye Harris (1970–1974)
- M. Nelson Loveland (1974–1999)
- Jeffrey M. Loveland (1999–2016)
- Randal L. Martin (2016–present).

Since the school's inception, seven chairs of the board of governors have served:

- M. Nelson Loveland (1970–1974)
- Lloyd Prouty (1974–1975)
- Stanley F. Frederick (1975–1987)
- Gene Martin (1987–1993)
- David Fiebig (1993–2006)
- Clyde S. Meckstroth (2006–2019)
- Steven T. Rasmussen (2019–present).

=== National awards and recognition ===
The King's Academy has received a number of national honors, including:

1986: The school received national recognition for excellence in education from President Ronald Reagan and U.S. Secretary of Education William Bennett as one of the top 60 private schools in the country.

1988: The band performed at the White House during President Ronald Reagan's term.

1989: The school's band students were selected to play for President George H. W. Bush and Vice President Dan Quayle at their inaugural parade.

2000: The school's fine arts students performed the world amateur premiere of Disney's Beauty and the Beast musical.

2007: Christian school researcher Dr. Gene Frost cited the school as one of the seven best Christian schools in America in his book, Learning from the Best: Growing Greatness in the Christian School.

2013: The school's fine arts students performed the world premiere of Disney's The Hunchback of Notre Dame (an English adaptation of the German-language musical Der Glöckner von Notre Dame).

2014: Dr. Frost reiterated the school's top seven national ranking.

2014: Arne Duncan, U.S. Secretary of Education for President Barack Obama, named the school a National Blue Ribbon School as an Exemplary High Performing School; one of 50 private schools to receive the honor.

2015: The National Football League named the school to its Super Bowl High School Honor Roll.

2016: The school's musical theatre program was named one of the nation's five best by the American High School Theatre Festival, winning the award for its performance of "Jekyll & Hyde."

2016: The school's boys golf team won a national championship at the Antigua National High School Golf Invitational in Scottsdale, Arizona; defeating the Utah state champion team by 11 strokes, the Arizona champion by 15 strokes, and the Illinois winner by 25 strokes.

2017: The school's choir and dance students were selected to perform for President Donald Trump and Vice President Mike Pence at their inaugural concert.

2017: For a second time, the school's musical theatre program was named one of the nation's five best by the American High School Theatre Festival, winning the award for its performance of "Les Miserables."

2017-2020, 2022, 2026: The school's competitive cheerleading team earned six National Grand Champion honors, defeating all teams, at the Fellowship of Christian Cheerleaders ("FCC") National Championships in Orlando, Florida.

2018: The school's conservatory students performed the world high school premiere of "Newsies" the musical.

2022: The school hosted the Fox News Hannity Town Hall Special Live Event which included Governor Ron DeSantis, US Senator Marco Rubio, and US Senator Rick Scott.

2022: TKA became the first brick-and-mortar K-12 school to earn a YouTube silver play button for 100,000 subscribers. By 2025, the school's @TKAWPB channel had more than 300,000 subscribers.

2023-2024: The school's conservatory students performed the world school and world amateur premieres of Sight & Sound's "Ruth" and "Joseph" musicals, respectively.

2024: Broadway's Jeremy Jordan performed a Christmas concert with the school's jazz ensemble.

2025: The school earned Exemplary Accreditation from the Association of Christian Schools International (ACSI), one of approximately 25 Christian schools in the USA to earn ACSI's highest award.

2025: Linda McMahon, U.S. Secretary of Education for President Donald Trump, nominated the school for a third National Blue Ribbon School as an Exemplary High Performing School; one of 50 private schools to receive the honor.

2025: First Lady Melania Trump, invited the school's jazz ensemble to perform Christmas favorites in the White House's East Room; one of 25 musical groups to be selected.

2026: Best-selling jazz saxophonist Kenny G collaborated with the school's jazz ensemble on a recording of "You Raise Me Up."

== Academic profile ==
The King's Academy was named a 1986, 2014, and 2025 National Blue Ribbon School by the U.S. Dept. of Education.

The King's Academy offers a college preparatory program for students from early childhood to 12th grade. The King's Academy is fully accredited by Cognia and the Association of Christian Schools International. The school's most recent re-accreditation study resulted in an extension of the school's exemplary accreditation through 2030.

=== Middle and high schools ===
The King's Academy's secondary schools educate students from 6th to 12th grade. On average, 99% of The King's Academy's graduates enter college, with 96% of graduates matriculating into a four-year university or college. Other graduates commit to service in the United States military branches. Recent commencement speakers have included Vice President Mike Pence, Mac Powell, Bob Goff, Dr. Ben Carson, Tim Tebow, Benjamin Watson, Gov. Mike Huckabee, Sen. Marco Rubio, Rep. Brian Mast, and TKA alumni Dr. Juli Slattery, US Tax Court Judge Emin Toro, and Gary Wallace.

The King's Academy offers 21 Advanced Placement courses and 39 hours of dual enrollment credits in partnership with Palm Beach Atlantic University and Southeastern University.

==== Business Program of Distinction ====
In 2013, the school established a business track for high school students. Business-minded students can earn a certificate of completion by taking electives in American entrepreneurship, economics, ethics, foreign language, marketing and statistics; along with becoming a member of Future Business Leaders of America (FBLA-PBL). In 2023, the school's accounting program was endowed by an anonymous donor.

==== DiMino Engineering & Technology Program of Distinction ====
In 2015, the school established a STEM magnet program for high school and elementary students, offering an academically rigorous science, technology, engineering and math curriculum. Students that complete the STEM track receive a certificate of completion.

In 2018, Frank DiMino gifted $1 million to endow the school’s engineering track and to establish the DiMino Engineering Program.

==== O'Keeffe Pre-Law Studies Program of Distinction ====
In 2016, the school established a pre-law track for high school students. Students interested in the field of law can earn a certificate of completion by taking six electives in law-related classes. In 2018, the Esther B. O'Keeffe Foundation donated $1 million to the Pre-Law Program, and King's named the program after the foundation.

==== Pre-Medical Program of Distinction ====
In 2017, the school established a sports medicine track for high school students. Students interested in the field of athletic training can earn a certificate of completion by taking five electives in sports medicine-related classes. Subsequently, the school added medical science terminology, pathology, applied research, and anatomy and physiology classes to allow students to also pursue a pre-medical certificate.

==== Christian Leadership Program of Distinction ====
In 2017, the school established a Christian leadership track for high school students. Students interested in a future career in ministry can earn a certificate of completion by enrolling and successfully completing three advanced biblical electives including Interpreting the Bible, Introduction to Christian Ministry, and Evangelism and Apologetics. In 2025, this program was endowed by an anonymous donor.

==== Aviation Program of Distinction ====
The school has also established an aviation program by which juniors and seniors can pursue a private pilot's license. In 2023, the program was gifted an on-campus flight simulator. In 2025, an anonymous donor endowed the program's annual scholarships.

=== Elementary school ===
The King's Academy's elementary school educates students from pre-Kindergarten to 6th grade. The school's elementary students' average scores ranked in the top 15 percent of private schools nationally for 2013 and 2014 academic standardized testing; qualifying the school as a Blue Ribbon Elementary School according to the U.S. Department of Education. As a result, the school was named a 2014 National Blue Ribbon School. In addition to academic subjects, the School's elementary program provides instruction in art, band, cognitive development, Latin, music appreciation, physical education, Spanish, science laboratory, technology and vocal music. Optional after-school extracurricular activities are offered for athletic and fine arts development.

=== Early childhood program ===
The King's Academy's early childhood program educates students from age 2 to pre-Kindergarten at its on-campus home, the Frank DiMino Early Childhood Center, which opened in 2024.

== Athletics ==
The King's Academy Athletic Shield.

The King's Academy's Lions athletics program competes in the following sports: Baseball, Basketball, Bowling, Cheerleading, Cross Country, Football, Golf, Lacrosse, Swimming and Diving, Soccer, Softball, Tennis, Track & Field, Volleyball (Indoor, Boys, and Beach), Weightlifting and Wrestling.

As a full member of the Florida High School Athletic Association (FHSAA), the school fields approximately 60 boys and girls teams in 30 FHSAA-sanctioned varsity sports.

=== Team championships ===
In 1992, The King's Academy's baseball team defeated Tallahassee Maclay for the school's first Florida state championship, and won another state title in 2001. The King's Academy volleyball team won the Florida state title in 1993, in 1994, and again in 2006. The King's Academy competitive cheerleading team won five consecutive FHSAA state championships from 2010 to 2014 and a sixth in 2019. In 2025, the school's boys' volleyball program won its first state championship with a 3-0 sweep of SLAM (Tampa) in the finals. In 2026, the school's girls' soccer program won its first state championship with a 5-4 penalty kick victory over Palmer Trinity.

In 2016, The King's Academy's boys' golf team won the school's first national championship at the Antigua National High School Golf Invitational in Scottsdale, Arizona. The school's competitive cheerleading team earned National Grand Champion and FHSAA Public School Champion honors at the 2017 through 2020, 2022, and 2026 FCC National Championships in Orlando, Florida.

In all, varsity teams competing for The King's Academy have won 181 FHSAA district championships, 64 FHSAA regional titles, 3 football conference titles, 7 Palm Beach County championship, 13 FHSAA state championships, and 7 national championships:

Sport	District Titles	Regional/Conference/County Titles	Final Fours	State/National Titles
Baseball	1975, 1977–78, 1983, 1992, 1998–2001, 2003, 2012–13, 2021	1992, 1997, 2001	1992, 1997, 2001	1992, 2001
Basketball (Boys)	1977–86, 1988–90, 2023, 2025	1978, 1982–84, 1986, 1989	1983, 1986	
Basketball (Girls)	1976–78, 1980, 1984–88, 1990, 1993–95, 2008–09, 2013, 2021–24	1976–78, 1984, 1990, 1993, 2022–23	2022-23	
Bowling (Boys)	2020			
Bowling (Girls)	2020			
Competitive Cheerleading		2002-04(^), 2014–15, 2017, 2019–22, 2024, 2026	2009(**), 2010–15, 2017-18(**), 2019, 2020, 2024–25, 2026(**)	2010–14, 2017-20(*), 2019, 2022(*), 2026(*)
Cross Country (Boys)	2011, 2016–18, 2021	2018-19, 2022(^^^)	2019	
Cross Country (Girls)	2012–14, 2016–18, 2020, 2023-24	2022-23(^^^)	2019	
Football	1976, 2004–05, 2022–24	2016-18(^^), 2018	1996, 2018(**)	
Golf (Boys)	2013–14, 2016–17	2015		2016(*)
Lacrosse (Boys)	2015			
Lacrosse (Girls)	2017, 2019			
Soccer (Boys)	2012–13, 2019, 2021, 2026			
Soccer (Girls)	1998–2000, 2007–12, 2026	2009, 2026	2009, 2026	2026
Softball	1988–89, 1993, 1995, 1997–2001, 2012–13, 2026	1993, 1998, 2012–13	1993(**), 1998(**), 2012–13	
Swimming (Boys)	2019-21, 2023–25	2019(^^^), 2019–20	2020(**), 2023	
Swimming (Girls)	2022-24	2021-22(^^^), 2022, 2024	2022-24	
Tennis (Girls)	2006-08	2008		
Track (Boys)	1980, 1990, 2001, 2009–12, 2017–18, 2021, 2025–26	2018, 2026		
Track (Girls)	1980–81, 1984, 1987–90, 2011, 2013, 2016, 2018, 2021, 2023, 2025–26	2006, 2018, 2022(^^^)	2006(**)	
Volleyball (Beach)	2021-25	2023	2023	
Volleyball (Boys)	2023-26	2023, 2025	2023, 2025	2025
Volleyball (Girls)	1977–78, 1984, 1992–94, 1996, 2000–02, 2005–08, 2015, 2017, 2020–25	1977–78, 1984, 1992–94, 2000, 2002, 2006–07, 2020	1993–94, 2000, 2002, 2006, 2007(**), 2020	1993–94, 2006
Weightlifting (Boys, Olympic)	2025-26	2025-26		
Weightlifting (Boys, Traditional)	2025-26	2025-26		
Weightlifting (Girls, Traditional)	2026	2026		
Wrestling (Boys, Duals)	2026			
Wrestling (Boys, Team)	2025-26			

(*) National title. (**) State runner-up. (^) FCC Division championship. (^^) Southeastern Football Conference championship. (^^^) Palm Beach County championship.

=== Individual Championships and Hall of Fame ===
While competing for The King's Academy, student-athletes have won 38 individual state and national athletic titles in cross country, golf, swimming, and track:

Year	Athlete(s)	Sport	Event	Winning Time/Distance/Score
1988	Zoboke Lehtinen	Track (Boys)	Shot Put	46-6
2001	Kathryn Hallquist	Swimming (Girls)	100y Backstroke	57.55
2001	Kathryn Hallquist	Swimming (Girls)	100y Butterfly	57.08
2003	Danielle Bradley	Track (Girls)	800m	2:18.20
2003	Hailey (Mercer) Neal	Track (Girls)	1600m	5:06.86
2003	Hailey (Mercer) Neal	Track (Girls)	3200m	11:28.86
2004	Hailey (Mercer) Neal	Cross Country (Girls)	5K	18:08
2004	Danielle Bradley	Track (Girls)	800m	2:15.72
2005	Danielle Bradley	Track (Girls)	800m	2:13.08
2005	Danielle Bradley, Hailey (Mercer) Neal, Hillary (Mercer) Neal, Amanda Jenkins	Track (Girls)	4 × 800 m Relay	9:35.42
2005	Hailey (Mercer) Neal	Track (Girls)	1600m	5:11.29
2005	Hailey (Mercer) Neal	Track (Girls)	3200m	11:09.40
2006	Danielle Bradley	Track (Girls)	800m	2:15.19
2006	Danielle Bradley, Hailey Neal, Hillary Neal, Gilda Doria	Track (Girls)	4 × 800 m Relay	9:36.77
2006	Hailey Neal	Track (Girls)	1600m	5:03.87
2007	Vincent Mercurio	Track (Boys)	Shot Put	53-5 1/4
2007	Hillary Neal	Track (Girls)	800m	2:15.72
2007	Hillary Neal	Track (Girls)	1600m	4:57.16
2008	Vincent Mercurio	Track (Boys)	Shot Put	55-7
2008	Ian Williams, Bryan Carpenter, Henry Cabrera, Burk Hedrick	Track (Boys)	4 × 400 m Relay	3:24.99
2009	Ian Williams	Track (Boys)	200m	22.41
2009	Ian Williams, Bryan Carpenter, Dallas Herrmann, Ricky Roy	Track (Boys)	4 × 100 m Relay	43.37
2010	Jamaal Wallace	Track (Boys)	Discus	156-4
2010	Ian Williams	Track (Boys)	200m	22.15
2013	Daysi Wilkinson, Payton Campbell, Katie Wentz, Emily Cohen	Track (Girls)	4 × 400 m Relay	4:03.14
2015	Andrew Kozan	Golf (Boys)	FHSAA State Golf Championship	141 (-3)
2016	Andrew Kozan (*)	Golf (Boys)	Antigua National H.S. Golf Invitational	137 (-7)
2017	Justin Bridgewater	Track (Boys)	800m	1.55.11
2018	Joshua Zuchowski	Swimming (Boys)	100y Backstroke	49.20
2019	Joshua Zuchowski, Christian Proscia, Noah Sipowski, Will Coady	Swimming (Boys)	200y Medley Relay	1.31.87
2019	Joshua Zuchowski	Swimming (Boys)	200y Medley	1.47.44
2019	Joshua Zuchowski	Swimming (Boys)	100y Backstroke	47.85
2020	Joshua Zuchowski	Swimming (Boys)	200y Medley	1.46.85
2020	Joshua Zuchowski	Swimming (Boys)	100y Backstroke	47.45
2021	Joshua Zuchowski	Swimming (Boys)	200y Individual Medley	1:45.51(#)
2021	Joshua Zuchowski	Swimming (Boys)	100y Backstroke	47.29
2022	Ava Fasano, Aly Bozzuto, Emma Herrera, Julianne Bell	Swimming (Girls)	200y Medley Relay	1:42.41
2022	Aly Bozzuto	Swimming (Girls)	50y Freestyle	22.69

(*) National champion. (#) Florida state record.

Individual athletes with significant accomplishments in both high school and the collegiate or professional levels are inducted into The King's Academy's Athletic Hall of Fame. To date, the following individuals have been included:

Name	Class of	Sport(s)	Induction Year
Jeff Loveland	1975	Football, Basketball, Baseball	2002
Kerry Smith Paguaga	1978	Volleyball, Basketball, Softball	2002
Scott Hamilton	1981	Football, Basketball, Track	2002
Amy Freeman	1995	Volleyball, Basketball, Softball	2002
Kristi Frenier	1996	Volleyball, Basketball, Softball	2002
Heath Evans	1997	Football, Basketball, Track	2002
Steve Hustad	1980	Baseball, Football, Basketball	2003
Pedro Arruza	1992	Football, Soccer, Baseball	2003
Kimmy Carter Bloemers	1998	Softball, Volleyball, Soccer	2003
John James	1983	Football, Basketball, Baseball	2004
Jennifer Mossadeghi	1999	Volleyball, Soccer, Tennis, Softball	2004
Karen Jackson Chapin	1994	Volleyball, Basketball, Softball	2005
Troy Roberson	1998	Baseball	2005
Rebekah Sentgeorge Haine	1993	Volleyball, Basketball, Softball	2006
Carrie Lorenz Himes	2001	Soccer, Cross Country, Track	2006
Mark Roncace	1991	Baseball, Basketball	2007
Janet Meckstroth Alessi	1978	Basketball, Softball, Volleyball	2007
Jon Roncace		TKA Coach 1972-2004	2007
Thomas "Gator" Brooks II	2001	Baseball, Football	2009
Kathryn Hallquist	2002	Swimming	2009
Danielle Bradley	2006	Basketball, Cross Country, Track & Field	2012
Colt Morton	2000	Baseball	2012
Hailey Neal	2007	Track, Cross Country	2013
Hillary Neal	2007	Track, Volleyball	2013
Andrew Woodward	1984	Basketball	2014
Christina Alessi	2010	Basketball, Volleyball	2016
Gilda Doria	2010	Soccer, Cross Country	2016
Emmanuel Lamur	2007	Football	2017
Sammuel Lamur	2007	Football	2017
Brooke Garmon	2010	Basketball, Track	2020
Richie Leber	1996	Basketball, Baseball, Coach	2020
Ian Williams	2010	Football, Track, Basketball	2020
Brian Grove	2012	Football, Track	2022
James Holland	2014	Football, Basketball	2022
Sarah Collins Wilson	2014	Soccer, Track & Field	2023
Kristen Wright	2015	Softball	2024
Andrew Kozan	2017	Golf	2024
Nate Toulson	2007	Football	2026
Daniel Pickett	2008	Football	2026

=== Athletic facilities ===
The King's Academy's football, soccer and lacrosse teams play home games on campus at Kahlert Stadium, a lighted, natural turf facility with seating for 1,850 fans. Lion and Lady Lion volleyball and basketball teams compete in the M. Nelson Loveland Athletic Center's gymnasium, which houses a game court and two practice courts and has seating for 800 spectators. The School's property also contains lighted baseball and softball fields, a track and field facility with seating for 300, six competition tennis courts, three beach volleyball courts, and a USATF certified 5-K cross-country course. In 2015, the school built the Full-Page Aquatic Center, comprising a 25-meter competition swimming pool and pool house, for use by its swimming teams.

On-campus athletic training facilities include a field house and weight and athletic training rooms, a covered basketball and volleyball pavilion, a golf practice facility, and three prescription athletic turf practice fields (football, multi-purpose and lacrosse). In all, The King's Academy maintains 15 acres of natural turf fields for its athletic program.

== The Smith Family Conservatory of the Arts ==
The King's Academy offers a comprehensive arts education to its preschool through high school students. Students perform in Broadway-style musicals, His People and His Voice choirs, jazz, band, percussion, strings, dance, visual arts, broadcasting, film and digital arts, and stagecraft. They can also earn diploma distinctions in theatre arts, instrumental arts, vocal arts, dance arts, visual arts, and digital arts. In 2016 and 2017, the school's conservatory program was ranked in the top five schools nationally by the American High School Theatre Festival.

=== Elementary Arts (Kidservatory) ===
Kindergarten through third grade students are taught music theory and receive beginning vocal training. They also participate in basic visual art classes.

=== Junior Conservatory ===
Students in fourth through eighth grade are given the opportunity to enroll and perform in theatre arts, instrumental arts including piano laboratory, vocal arts, photography and digital arts, and dance arts classes.

=== Theatre Arts ===
In April 2013, the school's students performed the world premiere of Disney's The Hunchback of Notre Dame (an English adaptation of the German-language musical Der Glöckner von Notre Dame). This performance was made in collaboration with Walt Disney Executive Studios. After viewing the performance, Disney executive Brian Turwilliger commented, "The story was so beautifully crafted and displayed in new and fresh ways." He explained that Disney will now offer The Hunchback of Notre Dame to be performed at other schools and amateur theaters, as it did with Beauty and the Beast after another Disney-The King's Academy collaboration in 2000 resulted in the world amateur stage premiere of the musical.

In 2015, the school's production of The Sound of Music was featured on an episode of ABC News' 20/20. The school's production of Jekyll & Hyde earned a 2016 top high school musical theatre program award from the American High School Theatre Festival and an invitation to perform Les Misérables at the 2017 Fringe Festival in London, England and Edinburgh, Scotland. In 2017, the school earned a second top theatre program award for its productions of "Les Miserables" and "Funny Girl." In 2018, the school premiered the nation's first high school production of Disney's Newsies (the musical). In 2023 and 2024, the school's conservatory students performed the global school and world amateur premieres of Sight & Sound Theatres' Ruth and Joseph musicals.

Other recent stage productions have included:

Season	Stage Productions
2006-07	The Mousetrap (play), The King & I (musical)
2007-08	God's Favorite (play), Children of Eden (musical)
2008-09	Lord Arthur Savile's Crime (play), The Music Man (musical)
2009-10	The Curious Savage (play), Rodgers and Hammerstein's Cinderella (musical)
2010-11	Strange Boarders (play), Disney's Beauty and the Beast (musical)
2011-12	The Diary of Anne Frank (play), Seussical Jr. (musical), Les Misérables (musical)
2012-13	Our Town (play), Annie Jr. (musical), Steel Magnolias (play), Disney's The Hunchback of Notre Dame (musical)
2013-14	Pygmalion (play), The Wizard of Oz (musical), Little Women (play), The Phantom of the Opera (musical)
2014-15	The Sound of Music (musical), Willy Wonka Jr. (musical), The Glass Menagerie (play), Anne of Green Gables (play), Titanic the Musical (concert), Aida (musical)
2015-16	Jekyll & Hyde (musical), A Christmas Carol (musical), Breakfast at Tiffany's (play), Wicked (concert), The Light in the Piazza (musical)
2016-17	Cheaper by the Dozen (play), And Then They Came for Me (play), Les Misérables (musical), Funny Girl (musical), The Lion King Jr. (concert)
2017-18	Disney's Beauty and the Beast (musical), White Christmas (musical), Peter and the Starcatcher (play), Oliver! (musical), Ghost the Musical
2018-19	Newsies (musical), “‘’Handel’s Messiah’’ (concert), Our Town (play), Titanic (musical), Miss Saigon (musical), Newsies (musical)
2019-20	Aida (musical), Hunchback of Notre Dame (musical), Jekyll & Hyde (musical), Broadway Spectacular/TKA 50th Anniversary Celebration featuring Sierra Boggess, Norm Lewis, Tony Yazbeck
2020-21	The Light in the Piazza (musical), Little Women (musical), Steel Magnolias (play), Into the Woods (musical), Frozen Jr. (musical), Les Misérables (musical)
2021-22	Mary Poppins (musical), Romeo + Juliet (play), Amelie (musical), Matilda Jr. (musical)
2022-23	The Little Mermaid (musical), Ruth the Musical (musical), The Music Man (musical), Annie Jr. (musical).
2023-24	Singin' in the Rain (musical), Big Fish (musical), The Nutcracker (ballet), Best of Broadway (Overture: There's No Business Like Show Business and Don't Rain on My Parade from Funny Girl, You Will Be Found from Dear Evan Hansen, Defying Gravity from Wicked, Masquerade from The Phantom of the Opera, You'll Never Walk Alone from Carousel, Journey to the Past from Anastasia, Santa Fe from Newsies, I Hope I Get It from A Chorus Line, Six from Six, My Shot from Hamilton & One Day More and Bring Him Home from Les Misérables) (performance), Peter Pan (musical)
2024-25	Sight and Sound's Joseph (musical), Charlie and the Chocolate Factory (musical), Best of Broadway (Overture: You Can't Stop the Beat from Hairspray, Summertime from Porgy and Bess, On My Own and I Dreamed a Dream from Les Misérables, Seasons of Love from Rent, Gonna Fly Now from Rocky the Musical, Can't Take My Eyes Off You from Jersey Boys, Against All Odds (Take a Look at Me Now) instrumental cover, Smooth Criminal from MJ the Musical, I Will Survive and Survivor (cover mashup), (Mamma Mia Medley: Mamma Mia, Gimme! Gimme! Gimme! (A Man After Midnight) and Dancing Queen from Mamma Mia!, She Used to Be Mine from Waitress, Only Us from Dear Evan Hansen and When You Believe from The Prince of Egypt) (performance), West Side Story (musical)
2025-26	The Prince of Egypt (musical), Henry V (play), Moana Jr. (musical), Guys and Dolls (musical)
2026-27	Finding Neverland (musical), A Christmas Carol (musical), Frozen Jr. (musical), Fiddler on the Roof (musical)

=== Instrumental Arts ===
The King's Academy offers instrumental classes for students starting with beginning band in 5th grade and intermediate band in 6th grade. Secondary students may choose to continue their studies in the school's concert and symphonic bands and symphony orchestra. The King's Academy also offers classes in jazz performance, woodwinds, percussion and strings.

==== TKA Jazz Ensemble ====
In 2024, the TKA Jazz Ensemble became the first high school group to perform onstage at New York City's renowned 54 Below Supper Club. In December 2025, First Lady Melania Trump invited the Ensemble to perform Christmas favorites in the White House's East Room. At its annual Night of Jazz performances, the Ensemble has also performed with notable musical guests including drummer Duffy Jackson (2018), trumpeter Wayne Bergeron (2022), trombonist Wycliffe Gordon (2023), The Voice's Wendy Moten (2024), Broadway star Jeremy Jordan (2024), flautist Nestor Torres (2025), jazz vocalist Nicole Henry (2025), and pianist Peter Cincotti (2026),. In 2026, best-selling jazz saxophonist Kenny G collaborated with the Ensemble on a recording of "You Raise Me Up." The TKA Jazz Ensemble is under the direction of Wes Lowe and Mickey Smith Jr., a 2020 Grammy Award winner.

==== The King's Regiment ====
The school's marching and parade band, The King's Regiment (formerly known as the Marching Lions) was a 3-time state runner-up (2008, 2010 and 2012) in Class A at the Florida Marching Band Championships. In 2013, the Marching Lions finished 10th in the nation (Class A) at the Bands of America's Grand National Championships, held at Indianapolis' Lucas Oil Stadium. In the mid-2010s, the band began performing solely as a parade band.

Past performances by the Marching Lions included:

Season	Show Title	Composer	Championship Ranking
2004	The Chase	Bill Chase	3rd, Class A (Florida)
2005	Cirque du Magique	music of La Nouba	3rd, Class A (Florida)
2006	Bon Voyage	Joseph Curiale	3rd, Class A (Bands of America Regionals)
2007	Amazonian Rainforest	Key Poulan	4th, Class A (Florida)
2008	Groove	Michael Pote	2nd, Class A (Florida)
2009	Aquasonic	Andrew Yozviak	9th, Class A (Florida)
2010	Classic Schizophrenia	Key Poulan	2nd, Class A (Florida)
2011	Transformed	Key Poulan	8th, Class A (Florida)
2012	Pyramids of Egypt	Gary P. Gilroy	2nd, Class A (Florida)
2013	A Pirate's Life	Gary P. Gilroy	10th, Class A (Bands of America Grand Nationals)
2014	My Many Colored Days	Richard Einhorn	4th, Class A (Florida)
2015	At The Crossroads	David Skinner & William Smith	3rd, Class A (Florida)

=== Digital Arts ===
The King's Academy's film program is named "Studio 70" in honor of the year of the school's founding in 1970. The program offers classes in film, photography, social media, and game design. Studio 70 student-produces short films, a summer feature film, and video games. The film program utilizes two LED volumes, offering adaptive virtual backgrounds, in its Studios A and B.

Studio 70's features include:

Year	Title	Length	Awards
2021	The Fountain of Youth	79 minutes	Telly Award (Siver), AVA Digital Award (Gold), Viddy Award (Platinum)
2022	The Wreck of Echo 10-4 (miniseries)	87 minutes	Communicator Award (Platinum), AVA Digital Award (Platinum), Viddy Award (Platinum)
2023	Flamingo Heist	78 minutes	Telly Award (Gold, Silver), Communicator Award (Platinum), AVA Digital Award (Platinum), Viddy Award (Platinum)
2023	The Making of The Wreck of Echo 10-4 (documentary)	71 minutes	Telly Award (Gold, Silver), AVA Award (Gold)
2024	Star Wars: Gray Trials (fan film)	83 minutes	Telly Award (2X Silver), AVA Digital Award (Platinum), Viddy Award (Platinum)
2024	Iron Dusk	95 minutes	Telly Award (2X Silver), AVA Digital Award (Platinum), Viddy Award (Gold)
2026	Star Wars: Knights of the Old Republic--Escape from Taris (fan film)	125 minutes	

== Notable alumni ==
- Pedro Arruza (class of 1992), head football coach, Randolph–Macon College
- Heath Evans (1997), former professional football player, Miami Dolphins, New England Patriots, and New Orleans Saints
- Lauren Jelencovich (2003), professional soprano singer
- Emmanuel Lamur (2007), former professional football player, Cincinnati Bengals, Minnesota Vikings, Oakland Raiders, and New York Jets
- Sammuel Lamur (2007), former professional football player, Tampa Bay Storm
- Larry the Cable Guy (Daniel Whitney, attended late 1970s-1980), stand-up comedian and actor
- Tasmin Mahfuz (2005), television journalist and news anchor, WGAL
- Mike Miller (2010), offensive coordinator and quarterback coach, UNC Charlotte
- Colt Morton (2000), former professional baseball player, San Diego Padres
- Gigi Perez (2018), singer-songwriter
- Rachel Rossin (2005), artist
- Emin Toro (1993), federal tax court judge

== Notable faculty ==
- Jarrod Saltalamacchia was the school's varsity baseball coach. Saltalamacchia was drafted in the first round of the 2003 Major League Baseball Draft by the Atlanta Braves. He won 3 Gold Medals with Team USA in 2000, 2003, and 2005 and the World Series with the Boston Red Sox in 2013. Saltalamacchia also had stints with the Miami Marlins, Arizona Diamondbacks, Detroit Tigers, and Toronto Blue Jays.
- Keith Allen was the school's STEM faculty chair and head football coach. Allen is the head football coach for Schreiner University, a position he has held since 2025. He was the head football coach at Southwest Baptist University from 2007 to 2012 and The King's Academy from 2013 to 2021.
- Brad Wilkerson was the school's head baseball coach. Wilkerson was a Major League baseball outfielder and first baseman who played college baseball for the University of Florida. During his professional career, Wilkerson played for the Montreal Expos, Boston Red Sox, Texas Rangers, Seattle Mariners, and Toronto Blue Jays. He also won a gold medal in the 2000 Olympics with the United States.
- Glenn Blackwood was a school board member and served as the school's head football coach in 2001 and 2002 and as an assistant football coach from 2003 to 2006. Blackwood played safety for the Miami Dolphins for ten NFL seasons and competed in two Super Bowls.

== Campus ==
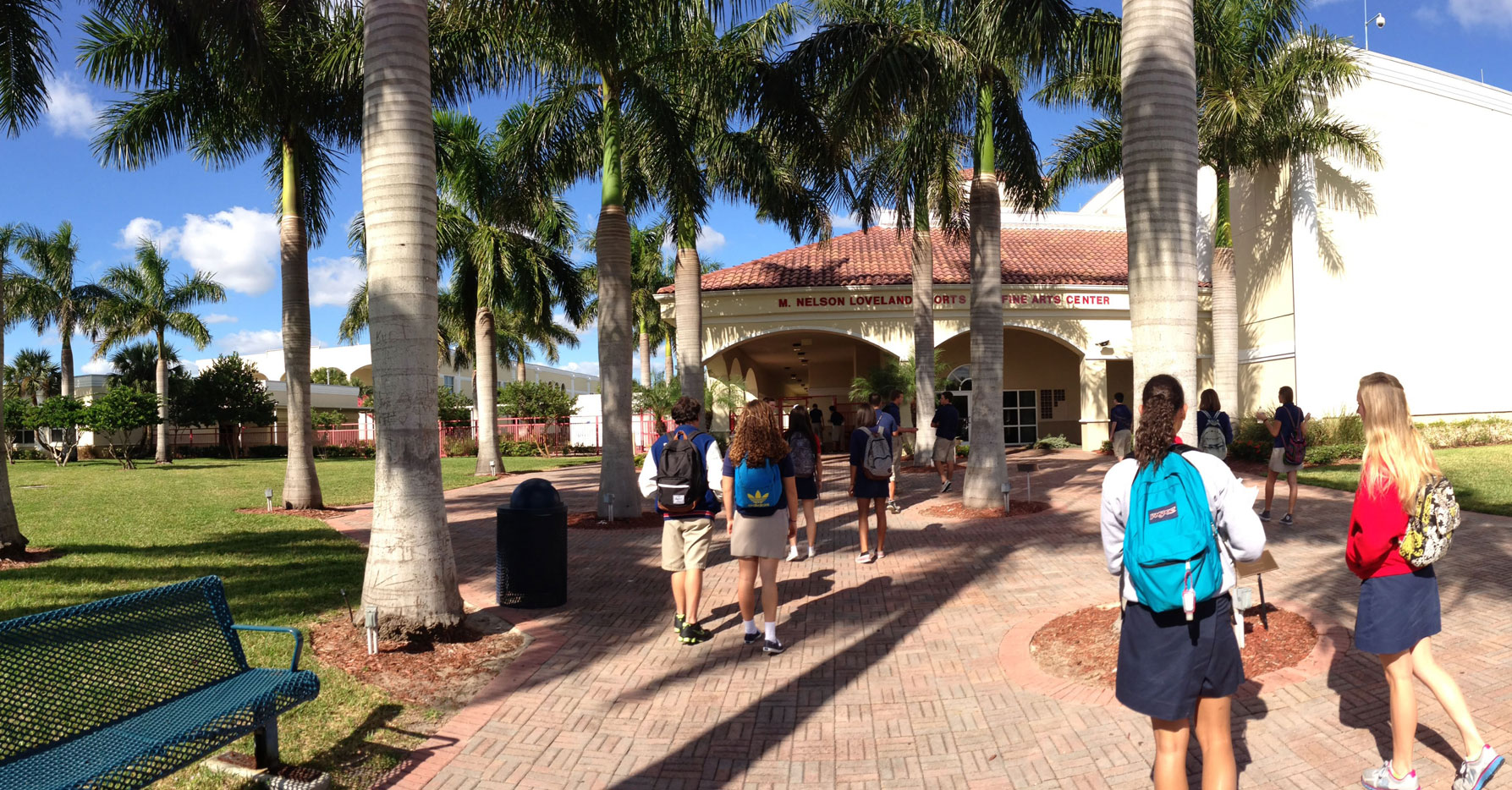
M. Nelson Loveland Athletic Center at The King's Academy

The King's Academy is located on approximately 65 acres at the northeast corner of Belvedere Road and Sansbury's Way in Palm Beach County, Florida. Most of the campus was constructed in 2005 and consists of 19 buildings (Lower Elementary, Administration, Upper Elementary, High School Administration, High School Science, High School Education, M. Nelson Loveland Athletic Center, Elementary Music, Smith Family Cafe, Rosemary Beaumont Library, Jeffrey & Gloria Loveland Field House, Bus Garage/Maintenance, Events Center (completed in 2012), Full-Page Aquatic Center (completed in 2015), Page Family Center for Performing Arts (completed in 2017), Boswell Science & Technology Center (completed in 2018), Frank DiMino Student Union (completed in 2022), the Esther B. O’Keeffe Innovation Center (completed in 2023), and the Frank DiMino Early Childhood Center (completed in 2024)) encompassing approximately 267,000 square feet under air.

In 2015, the school added Studio 70, a film and television broadcasting facility.

== Online learning ==
In 2010, The King's Academy established an internet-based school for middle and high school students called The King's Academy Online. The online program offered approximately 140 courses, with advanced placement courses and dual enrollment credits from Christian institutions including Indiana Wesleyan University and Taylor University.

In 2022, TKA's online school was relaunched as The King's Online Academy (TKOA), with 100 percent self-developed, proprietary classes; including dual enrollment classes from Palm Beach Atlantic University. TKOA offers more than 100 classes for students in grades 7 through 12, including honors and advanced placement courses and classes from all seven of TKA's Programs of Distinction. Additionally, TKOA offers master classes from notable Christian instructors including Bob Goff, Dan Cathy, Lee Strobel, and Mac Powell.

== Publications ==
The King's Academy publishes student-produced elementary (EL) and high school (HS) yearbooks (both named The Sceptre) annually, student-written newspapers (Roar, formerly The Lion Ledger and The Scroll) and semi-annual magazines (The Chronicle). During the school year, the school also issues a weekly online edition of TKA E-News.

From 2014 to 2016 and 2023 to 2025, the school's yearbook program was named a Jostens National Yearbook Program of Excellence.

The school's yearbooks have included:

Year	Title	Dedicated To	Pages	Year	Title	Dedicated To	Pages
1971	SCEPTRE- Volume I	William H. Vimont, Founding Headmaster	58 (8 color)	2007EL	LEAVE YOUR MARK	Carolyn Slade, Sixth Grade Teacher	111 (full color)
1972	SCEPTRE- Volume II	Kye Harris, Founding President	77 (4 color)	2007HS	STAR QUALITY	Douglas Raines, History Teacher	256 (b&w/color)
1973	SCEPTRE- Volume III	Robert C. Brooks, Assistant Headmaster	109 (14 color)	2008EL	BETTER TOGETHER	Anthony & Laurie Campbell, Elem Coord & Acad Support	110 (full color)
1974	SCEPTRE- Volume IV	David A. Frazier, History Teacher	145 (8 color)	2008HS	BETTER TOGETHER	Anthony & Laurie Campbell, Elem Coord & Acad Support	248 (full color)
1975	SCEPTRE- Volume V	M. Nelson Loveland, President	175 (8 color)	2009EL	I LIVE	Paula DeJesus, School Nurse	113 (full color)
1976	GOD BLESS AMERICA	TKA Board of Governors	159 (14 color)	2009HS	BECOMING THE ARCHETYPE	Andy Camizzi, Art Teacher	272 (full color)
1977	SCEPTRE- Volume VII	Paul A. Tatham, Executive Vice President	169 (16 color)	2010EL	BREAKING FREE	Jean Albert, Elementary Assistant Principal	139 (full color)
1978	SCEPTRE- Volume VIII	Stanley Frederick, Board of Governors Chairman	197 (17 color)	2010HS	inTENse	Bob & Fatima Silva, Spanish & Latin Teachers	280 (full color)
1979	MEMORIES	Tom Mossop, Director of Operations	185 (17 color)	2011EL	WHAT REALLY COUNTS	Bev Hodel, Elementary Assistant Principal	140 (full color)
1980	WE'VE ONLY JUST BEGUN	Richard Harrington, High School Counselor	186 (17 color)	2011HS	ONE SCHOOL	David Linder, Security	252 (full color)
1981	ONCE UPON A YEAR	Jon Roncace, Athletic Director	189 (17 color)	2012EL	LINKED	Greg Dulkowski, Elementary Physical Education Teacher	144 (full color)
1982	SCEPTRE- Volume XII	Caroline Sigmon, High School Counselor	191 (16 color)	2012HS	THRIVE	Randal & Heidi Martin, VP, CFO & Mathematics Teacher	288 (full color)
1983	SCEPTRE- Volume XIII	Mary Anderson, Spanish Teacher	179 (15 color)	2013EL	HOW WE GET THERE	Kim Phillips, Fourth Grade Teacher	147 (full color)
1984	SCEPTRE- Volume XIV	Andreana Wisniewski, Science Teacher	208 (16 color)	2013HS	AND LIFTED UP	Nancy Stack, English Teacher	279 (full color)
1985	SCEPTRE- Volume XV	Mary Purdie, Elementary Principal	208 (16 color)	2014EL	SMALL CHANGE	Robin Wentz, Transportation Coordinator	160 (full color)
1986	THE YEAR IN PICTURES	Oliver Steele, High School Principal	240 (16 color)	2014HS	MAKE YOURSELF CLEAR	Anne Spell, Business Teacher	291 (full color)
1987	LET THERE BE LIGHT	Cecil Walker, History Teacher	235 (16 color)	2015EL	TAKE YOUR TURN	Robin Phillips, Elementary Vocal Music Teacher	144 (full color)
1988	A TOUCH OF CLASS	Gary Slade, Physical Education Teacher	231 (49 color)	2015HS	BIGGER & BETTER	Sonya Jones, High School Principal	284 (full color)
1989	SCRAP THE '80s	Wilbur Mundt, Janitor	239 (b&w/color)	2016EL	HIDE & SEEK	Deborah Lopez, Housekeeping	148 (full color)
1990	GENUINE LION	M. Nelson Loveland, President (2nd Dedication)	215 (b&w/color)	2016HS	RELENTLESS	Jim & Michelle Kolar, Asst. Principal & Dir. of Student Life	302 (full color)
1991	MORE THAN JUST A NUMBER	Jean Frazier, Elementary Supervisor	225 (b&w/color)	2017EL	MORE COLORFUL TOGETHER	Bunny Crocetti, Receptionist	144 (full color)
1992	A SHARPER IMAGE	Cecil Walker, History Teacher (2nd Dedication)	247 (b&w/color)	2017HS	CONSTANT CHANGE	Jennifer Arrington, Science Teacher	268 (full color)
1993	RECYCLE THE TIMES	Robert Fletcher, Bible & Economics Teacher	251 (b&w/color)	2018EL	RADIANT	Dan McDonald, 6th Grade Teacher	148 (full color)
1994	ETCHED IN STONE	Jeff Gentry, English Teacher	261 (b&w/color)	2018HS	BEYOND MEASURE	Tammy Richardson, Department of Mathematics Chair	302 (full color)
1995	ONCE UPON OUR TIME	M. Nelson (3rd Ded) & Jane Loveland, Pres & Asst	272 (b&w/color)	2019EL	DEFINE US	Heidi Patchin, 3rd Grade Teacher	176 (full color)
1996	THE BIG PICTURE	Delia Albee, First Grade Teacher	271 (b&w/color)	2019HS	RIPTIDE	Donna Phillips, Science Teacher	280 (full color)
1997	ATTITUDE IS EVERYTHING	Karen Moore, Receptionist	273 (b&w/color)	2020EL	PAWS FOR THE MOMENT	Sandy Erneston, Physical Education Teacher	164 (full color)
1998	OUT WITH THE OLD, IN WITH THE NEW	Carol Lynne Hirsh, Cafeteria Manager	284 (b&w/color)	2020HS	DON'T BLINK.	David Snyder, Artistic Director	320 (full color)
1999	SAVING THE BEST FOR LAST	Chris Huether, Bible Teacher	310 (b&w/color)	2021EL	GRATEFUL TOGETHER	Kim Smith, 5th Grade Teacher	144 (full color)
2000	YESTERDAY, TODAY, AND FOREVER	Mary Anderson, Spanish Teacher (2nd Dedication)	296 (68 color)	2021HS	OUR SILVER LINING	John Raines, History Teacher	272 (full color)
2001	ONE FOCUS	Jeffrey M. Loveland, President	314 (98 color)	2022EL	BUILT ON THIS	Adam Miller, Elementary Principal	200 (full color)
2002	FOR FUTURE REFERENCE	United States of America	306 (82 color)	2022HS	THROUGH THE EYES OF A LION	Rosario Larson, Director of Development	312 (full color)
2003	THE TIME IS NOW	Shannan Kiedis, Choral Assistant	292 (116 color)	2023EL	STRONG IN NUMBER	David Burke, Director of Facilities	192 (full color)
2004EL	STAND OUT	Jon Otto, Elementary Principal	124 (full color)	2023HS	SEALED WITHIN	Joel Henning, Science Teacher	344 (full color)
2004HS	STAND OUT	Andreana Wisniewski, High School Dean (2nd Ded)	232 (96 color)	2024EL	GROWING UP TOGETHER	Rett Paulsen, Academic Support Teacher	184 (full color)
2005EL	OLD SCHOOL	Retta Calcutt, Second Grade Teacher	128 (full color)	2024HS	LIMITLESS	Susan Lockmiller, Journalism and Print Media Teacher	368 (full color)
2005HS	OLD SCHOOL	Catherine Hilliard, Receptionist	227 (116 color)	2025EL	LONG STORY SHORT	Kelly Martin, 3rd Grade Teacher	208 (full color)
2006EL	BLUEPRINTS TO FOOTPRINTS	Sharon Caldwell, Elementary Dean	103 (full color)	2025HS	STAND OUT	Tyler Hamilton, Athletic Trainer	392 (full color)
2006HS	BLUEPRINTS TO FOOTPRINTS	David Snyder, Choral & Artistic Director	240 (65 color)	2026EL	A WALK IN OUR SHOES	Jennifer Pope, 4th Grade Teacher	232 (full color)
				2026HS	WE ARE 8401 BELVEDERE ROAD	Debbie Rantin, High School Principal	392 (full color)
