= Restoration =

Restoration is the act of restoring something to its original state. This may refer to:

- Conservation and restoration of cultural property
  - Audio restoration
  - Conservation and restoration of immovable cultural property
  - Film restoration
  - Image restoration (disambiguation)
  - Textile restoration
- Ecological restoration

Restoration may also refer to:

== Film and television ==
- The Restoration (1909 film), a film by D.W. Griffith starring Mary Pickford
- The Restoration (1910 film), an American silent short drama produced by the Thanhouser Company
- The Restoration (2020 film), a Peruvian comedy film
- Restoration (1995 film), a film by Michael Hoffman starring Robert Downey Jr
- Restoration (2011 film), an Israeli film by Yossi Madmoni
- Restoration (2016 film), an Australian science fiction thriller by Stuart Willis
- Restoration (TV series), a BBC TV series
- "Restoration" (Arrow), an episode of Arrow
- "Restoration" (Shifting Gears), an episode of Shifting Gears

== History ==
- Kenmu Restoration (1333) in Japan
- Portuguese Restoration War (1640–1668)
- Stuart Restoration (1660) in England, Wales and associated realms
  - Restoration (Ireland)
  - Restoration (Scotland)
  - Restoration in the English colonies
- Restoration and Regeneration in Switzerland (1814–1830)
- First Restoration in France (1814)
- Bourbon Restoration in France (1815)
- Restoration (Peru) (1839–1841), also called the Peruvian Restoration
- Dominican Restoration War (1863–1865)
- Meiji Restoration (1868) in Japan
- Restoration (Spain) (1874–1931), also called the Bourbon Restoration
- Manchu Restoration (1917) in China
- Restoration House, an Elizabethan mansion manor house in Rochester, Kent, England

== Literature ==
- Restoration literature, English literature written during the Stuart Restoration of 1660–1688
- Restoration comedy, English comedy written and performed in the English Restoration period of 1660–1710
- Restoration (Berg novel), 2002, by Carol Berg
- Restoration (Ólafsson novel), 2012, by Ólafur Jóhann Ólafsson
- Restoration (Tremain novel), 1989, by Rose Tremain set during the English Revolution
- Restoration (newspaper), a Catholic newspaper published by the Madonna House Apostolate

== Music ==
- Restorations (band), an American rock band
- Restoration (EP), an EP by Haken, 2014
- Restoration (Lecrae album), 2020
- Restoration (Røry album), 2025
- The Restoration – Joseph: Part Two, by Neal Morse, 2024
- Restoration, half of the Revamp & Restoration double tribute album to Elton John and Bernie Taupin, 2018
- "The Restoration", a song from Jacobite Relics

== Religion ==
- Church of God (Restoration), denomination rooted in the holiness movement
- Restoration (Latter Day Saints), doctrine of the Latter Day Saint movement
- Restoration branches, independent Latter Day Saints organizations
- Restoration Movement, a Christian movement originating in the 19th century that seeks to restore the doctrine and practice of the early church
- Victorian restoration, extensive refurbishment and rebuilding of Church of England churches during the 19th-century

== Ships ==
- HMS Restoration (1678), a third rate built by Betts
- HMS Restoration (1706), a third rate
- Restaurationen (Restoration), a sloop

== Other uses ==
- Dental restoration
- Restoration Hardware, a hardware store
- Restoration style
- Restoration of the Monarchy, a fashion label by Eric Villency
- Foreskin restoration, the process of regaining some of the tissue lost in circumcision

== See also ==
- Restauration (disambiguation)
- Restorationism (disambiguation)
- Concert of Europe, the European Restoration following the Napoleonic Wars
- Reforestation, natural or intentional restocking of existing forests and woodlands that have been depleted, usually through deforestation
- Restorative justice, in criminal justice sometimes called restoration
- Restore (disambiguation)
