= Restore =

Restore may refer to:

== Businesses and organisations ==
- Restore Britain, a British political party
- Restore International, former name of Love Does, a nonprofit organization
- Restore plc, a British document management company

== Music ==
- "Restore", a single by Chris August
- Restore (EP), a 2022 EP by South Korean duo Jinjin & Rocky

== Other uses ==
- Restore, a term used for creating original data from a backup copy of computer data.
  - RESTORE (DOS command)

== See also ==
- Project Restore, an ocean restoration project led by the Sydney Institute of Marine Science
- Restor, an online platform supporting ecological projects
- Restoration (disambiguation)
- Restored (album)
