= Independence Community College =

Public college in Independence, Kansas, US

- Type: Public community college
- Established: 1925
- President: Taylor Crawshaw (interim)
- Students: 821 (Fall 2023)
- Location: Independence, Kansas, United States; 37°11′40″N 95°43′17″W
- Campus: Rural
- Colors: Navy blue and Vegas gold
- Mascot: Pirates
- Website: indycc.edu

Independence Community College is a public community college in Independence, Kansas. It was formerly Independence Community Junior College.

== History ==
Independence Community College was established in 1925 as grades 13 and 14 of the Independence public school system. In 1967, Independence Community College legally separated from the school district. Construction of the new community college on a 68-acre (28 ha) campus, formerly the Independence Country Club, began in 1969. Classes at the new site began in September 1970. The ICC campus is now home to the Academic Building, Fine Arts Building, Student Union, Center for Innovation and Entrepreneurship, Field House, Administration Building, William Inge Center for the Arts, fitness center, athletic practice fields, disc golf course, 96-bed multi-structure living complex, a 200-bed residence hall, and a 135-bed suite-style residence hall. In 2010, a former large retail space was donated at a location next to the local Wal-Mart. The college renovated the new West Campus, increasing the college's visibility in the community and adding much-needed space for technical programs. A capital campaign was conducted, raising $760,000 for renovation of the facility. The college has also contributed approximately $350,000 to the renovation of that building. This campus is located on the west side of Independence and is home to Allied Health, Cosmetology, Veterinary Technology, and Culinary. ICC also maintains a presence downtown through the ICC Foundation office, which is a separate organization from the college.

It is the featured college in the third and fourth seasons of the Netflix series Last Chance U.

== Academics ==
Independence Community College is accredited by the Higher Learning Commission and offers several associate degrees along with more than 20 certificate programs in vocational occupations.

== Athletics ==
The ICC athletic teams are called the Pirates and the official team colors are Navy Blue and Vegas Gold. The college is affiliated with the National Junior College Athletic Association and is a member of the Kansas Jayhawk Community College Conference. As of Fall of 2018, there will be nine athletic programs on campus: football, volleyball, cheer and dance, men's and women's basketball, women's softball, golf, Throughout the course of the academic year, students have the opportunity to cheer on their Pirates at over 100 home games.

== Student groups ==
Independence Community College offers a handful of different activities for students to participate in outside of sports. There is a book club that meets once a week and decides together what books to read and discuss. The Buccaneer is the campus newspaper that is composed of articles written by students and staff alike. Open Mic Nights allow students, employees, and community members to read or perform their original or favorite literary or musical works. ICC also has a multi-cultural student organization (MSO) whose purpose is to bring together students of different cultural backgrounds and foster an attitude of acceptance. Phi Theta Kappa is an honor society for junior colleges. Every few months the campus also sponsors some sort of intramural tournament that generally lasts about two days.

== William Inge Center for the Arts ==
ICC is also home to the William Inge Center for the Arts, named after famous playwright, William Inge, an alumnus of the college. The center is home to the Inge Festival which is a four-day festival in which community members and students alike can participate in workshops, attend plays, and tour the historical sites around town that were part of Inge's childhood. The campus library is also home to a collection of original manuscripts, William Inge's personal book collection and his personal record collection.

== Fab Lab ICC ==
In 2014, Fab Lab ICC was constructed in the former Cessna Learning Center on ICC main campus. Fab Lab ICC houses tools for digital fabrication, small business development, graphic design, computer aided manufacturing, and rapid prototyping. Public memberships are available and ICC students, faculty, and staff receive a Fab Lab ICC membership for free.

== Notable alumni ==
- Tank Dell, professional football player
- Armen Gilliam, professional basketball player
- Harvey Grant, professional basketball player
- William Inge, playwright and novelist
- Bobby Johnson, professional football player
- Jermaine Johnson II, professional football player
- Emmanuel Lamur, professional football player
- Sammuel Lamur, professional football player
- Bruce McCray, professional football player
- Jonathan Mogbo, professional basketball player
- Ron Parker, professional football player
- Allen Patrick, professional football player
- Ruben Patterson, professional basketball player
- Tarik Phillip, professional basketball player
- Zahir Porter, professional basketball player
- Reggie Rembert, professional football player
- Antwoine Sanders, professional football player
- Ancuţa Stoenescu, professional basketball player
- Brad Underwood, college basketball coach
- Ron Warner, professional football player
