= Jonathan Mogbo =

American basketball player (born 2001)

No. 22 – Sacramento Kings
- Position: Power forward
- League: NBA

Personal information
- Born: October 29, 2001 (age 25) West Palm Beach, Florida, U.S.
- Listed height: 6 ft 7 in (2.01 m)
- Listed weight: 225 lb (102 kg)

Career information
- High school: Cardinal Newman (West Palm Beach, Florida); Forest Hill (West Palm Beach, Florida)
- College: Independence CC (2020–2021); Northeastern Oklahoma A&M (2021–2022); Missouri State (2022–2023); San Francisco (2023–2024)
- NBA draft: 2024: 2nd round, 31st overall pick
- Drafted by: Toronto Raptors
- Playing career: 2024–present

Career history
- 2024–2026: Toronto Raptors
- 2024–2026: →Raptors 905
- 2026–present: Sacramento Kings
- 2026–present: →Stockton Kings

Career highlights
- First-team All-WCC (2024); WCC Newcomer of the Year (2024)
- Stats at NBA.com
- Stats at Basketball Reference

Jonathan Michael Mogbo (/ˈmoʊboʊ/ MOH-boh; born October 29, 2001) is an American basketball player for the Sacramento Kings of the National Basketball Association (NBA), on a two-way contract with the Stockton Kings of the NBA G League. He played college basketball for the Independence CC Pirates, the Northeastern Oklahoma A&M Golden Norsemen, the Missouri State Bears and the San Francisco Dons.

== Early life and high school career ==
Mogbo was raised in Wellington, Florida, by his parents Chuck and Karen Mogbo. His father is of Nigerian descent and his mother is Jamaican. Mogbo has two older stepbrothers and one older brother.

Mogbo played football while growing up and did not start playing organized basketball until he was in the fourth grade. He played alongside future Toronto Raptors teammate Scottie Barnes on an Amateur Athletic Union (AAU) basketball team. Barnes lived with Mogbo and his family during his freshman year when they both attended Cardinal Newman High School in West Palm Beach, Florida. Mogbo later attended Forest Hill Community High School.

== College career ==
Mogbo had no Division I scholarship offers in high school and began his college basketball career at Independence Community College. He transferred to Northeastern Oklahoma A&M College before the start of his sophomore season. Mogbo averaged 14.3 points, 10.3 rebounds, and 1.4 blocks per game with the Golden Norsemen.

Mogbo transferred to Missouri State for his junior season. He was the Bears' starting power forward and averaged eight points, seven rebounds, 1.4 assists, 1.3 steals and 1.1 blocks per game. After the season, Mogbo entered NCAA transfer portal.

Mogbo ultimately transferred to San Francisco. He was named the West Coast Conference (WCC) Newcomer of the Year and first-team All-WCC after averaging 14.2 points and a conference-high 10.1 rebounds per game. After the season, Mogbo declared for the 2024 NBA draft and re-entered the NCAA transfer portal. He opted to remain in the draft and forgo his remaining season of college eligibility.

== Professional career ==
=== Toronto Raptors (2024–2026) ===
On June 27, 2024, Mogbo was selected with the 31st overall pick by the Toronto Raptors in the 2024 NBA draft and on July 4, he signed with them. During his rookie season, he was assigned several times to Raptors 905. On April 9, 2025, Mogbo recorded his first career triple-double with 17 points, 11 assists, and 10 rebounds in a 126–96 win over the Charlotte Hornets. He made 63 appearances (including 18 starts) for the Raptors during his rookie campaign, averaging 6.2 points, 4.9 rebounds, and 2.3 assists.

Mogbo made 40 appearances for the Raptors during the 2025–26 NBA season, recording averages of 1.5 points, 1.7 rebounds, and 0.6 assists.

=== Sacramento / Stockton Kings (2026–present) ===
On July 3, 2026, Mogbo signed a two-way contract with the Sacramento Kings.

== Career statistics ==
Legend
GP	Games played	GS	Games started	MPG	Minutes per game
FG%	Field goal percentage	3P%	3-point field goal percentage	FT%	Free throw percentage
RPG	Rebounds per game	APG	Assists per game	SPG	Steals per game
BPG	Blocks per game	PPG	Points per game	**Bold**	Career high

=== NBA ===
==== Regular season ====
Year	Team	GP	GS	MPG	FG%	3P%	FT%	RPG	APG	SPG	BPG	PPG
2024–25	Toronto	**63**	**18**	**20.4**	.438	**.243**	**.732**	**4.9**	**2.3**	**.9**	**.5**	**6.2**
2025–26	Toronto	40	0	6.2	**.591**	.000	.643	1.7	.6	.3	.2	1.5
Career		103	18	14.9	.455	.239	.719	3.7	1.7	.6	.4	4.4

==== Playoffs ====
Year	Team	GP	GS	MPG	FG%	3P%	FT%	RPG	APG	SPG	BPG	PPG
2026	Toronto	3	0	1.3	1.000	—	—	.0	.0	.0	.0	1.3
Career		3	0	1.3	1.000	—	—	.0	.0	.0	.0	1.3

=== College ===
==== NCAA Division I ====
Year	Team	GP	GS	MPG	FG%	3P%	FT%	RPG	APG	SPG	BPG	PPG
2022–23	Missouri State	30	28	24.4	.589	—	.432	7.0	1.4	1.3	**1.1**	8.0
2023–24	San Francisco	**34**	**34**	**28.9**	**.636**	.000	**.692**	**10.1**	**3.6**	**1.6**	.8	**14.2**
Career		64	62	26.8	.619	.000	.578	8.7	2.6	1.4	1.0	11.3

==== NJCAA ====
Year	Team	GP	GS	MPG	FG%	3P%	FT%	RPG	APG	SPG	BPG	PPG
2020–21	Independence CC	23	13	22.7	**.497**	.250	.614	5.9	2.1	1.2	**1.9**	8.1
2021–22	Northeastern Oklahoma A&M	**30**	**29**	**30.1**	**.497**	**.346**	**.652**	**10.3**	**3.3**	**1.8**	1.4	**14.3**
Career		53	42	26.9	.497	.316	.639	8.4	2.8	1.6	1.6	11.6
