= Heath Evans =

American football player and sports analyst (born 1978)

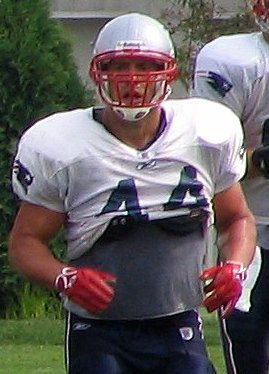
- Evans with the New England Patriots in 2007

No. 44
- Position: Fullback

Personal information
- Born: December 30, 1978 (age 47); West Palm Beach, Florida, U.S.
- Listed height: 6 ft 0 in (1.83 m)
- Listed weight: 250 lb (113 kg)

Career information
- High school: The King's Academy (West Palm Beach, Florida)
- College: Auburn
- NFL draft: 2001: 3rd round, 82nd overall pick

Career history
- Seattle Seahawks (2001–2004); Miami Dolphins (2005); New England Patriots (2005–2008); New Orleans Saints (2009–2010)

Awards and highlights
- Super Bowl champion (XLIV)

Career NFL statistics
- Rushing yards: 579
- Rushing average: 3.5
- Rushing touchdowns: 4
- Receptions: 57
- Receiving yards: 439
- Receiving touchdowns: 4
- Stats at Pro Football Reference

Bryan Heath Evans (born December 30, 1978) is an American former professional football player who was a fullback in the National Football League (NFL). After playing college football for the Auburn Tigers, he was selected by the Seattle Seahawks in the third round of the 2001 NFL draft. He also played in the NFL for the Miami Dolphins, New England Patriots, and New Orleans Saints, the last of which he won a Super Bowl with while on injured reserve. Evans retired after the 2010 season and was formerly an analyst with NFL Network.

== Early life ==
While attending The King's Academy in West Palm Beach, Evans lettered in football and basketball. In football, he was a two-time All-State selection as a tailback. During a game his junior year, Heath was once tackled in the backfield by Tom Segura.

== College career ==
Evans attended Auburn University. In football, he finished his three-year career with 149 rushing attempts for 626 yards (4.2 yards per rush) and six touchdowns, and 30 receptions for 354 yards (11.8 yards per reception) and a touchdown.

== Professional career ==
Pre-draft measurables
Height	Weight	Arm length	Hand span	40-yard dash	10-yard split	20-yard split	20-yard shuttle	Three-cone drill	Vertical jump	Broad jump	Bench press
5 ft 11 7/8 in (1.83 m)	246 lb (112 kg)	31 1/2 in (0.80 m)	9 in (0.23 m)	4.56 s	1.59 s	2.64 s	4.24 s	7.30 s	34.5 in (0.88 m)	9 ft 3 in (2.82 m)	30 reps
All values from NFL Combine

=== Seattle Seahawks ===
Evans was the first fullback taken in the 2001 NFL draft, with the Seahawks selecting him in the third round (82nd overall). Evans spent four years in Seattle blocking for running back Shaun Alexander.

=== Miami Dolphins ===
Evans signed with the Miami Dolphins in the spring of 2005. While in Miami, Evans was re-united with former Auburn tailback Ronnie Brown (with whom he was a teammate in 2000), but was cut six weeks into the season.

=== New England Patriots ===
One week later, the New England Patriots signed Evans for the remainder of the 2005 season. On November 16, he filled in for an injured Corey Dillon at tailback against his former team and rushed for 84 yards on 17 carries and caught 3 passes for 18 yards, subsequently leading the Patriots to victory. On March 23, 2006, the Patriots re-signed Evans as an unrestricted free agent to another one-year contract.

During the 2006 season, Evans ran for 117 yards on 27 carries. He also caught 7 passes for 34 yards. In week 5 against the Dolphins, Evans scored his first career touchdown on a 1-yard reception from Tom Brady. Two weeks later against the Minnesota Vikings, Evans recorded his career long carry of 35 yards. Against the San Diego Chargers in the playoffs, Evans recorded 3 special team tackles in the Patriots' 24–21 upset. Evans caught 4 passes in the AFC Championship loss to the Colts.

On February 24, 2007, the Patriots announced that Evans signed a two-year contract extension, keeping him off the free agent market. During the pre-season, in a Week 3 scrimmage against the Carolina Panthers, Evans rushed for 58 yards on 7 carries with 1 touchdown and caught 2 receptions for 19 yards and a score. His touchdown run was of 2 yards and his touchdown reception was of 8 yards. In total, he had 77 yards of total offense on 9 touches with 2 touchdowns. Evans rushed for a 2-yard touchdown against the New York Jets in a 38–14 victory in the opening game of the 2007 season.

=== New Orleans Saints ===
An unrestricted free agent in the 2009 offseason, Evans was signed by the New Orleans Saints on March 5. Upon the signing, the team released incumbent fullback Mike Karney. Evans played in the Saints' first six games (5 att, 16yds, 1 touchdown), but he suffered a season-ending knee injury in their October 25 game against the Miami Dolphins and was placed on the injured reserve list. While Evans was on injured reserve, the Saints went on to beat the Indianapolis Colts in Super Bowl XLIV, earning Evans his only Super Bowl ring.

=== Retirement ===
On August 24, 2011, Evans announced via Twitter that he had decided to retire from the NFL after 10 seasons, agreeing to a multi-year contract to become an analyst for the NFL Network.

== NFL career statistics ==
Legend
**Bold**	Career high

=== Regular season ===
Year	Team	Games		Rushing					Receiving				
Year	Team	GP	GS	Att	Yds	Avg	Lng	TD	Rec	Yds	Avg	Lng	TD
2001	SEA	**16**	0	2	11	**5.5**	7	0	0	0	0.0	0	0
2002	SEA	**16**	1	17	53	3.1	8	0	8	41	5.1	13	0
2003	SEA	14	0	7	24	3.4	8	0	2	34	17.0	20	0
2004	SEA	15	0	7	20	2.9	7	0	2	12	6.0	9	0
2005	MIA	6	2	1	0	0.0	0	0	4	17	4.3	5	0
2005	NE	6	1	**51**	**192**	3.8	21	0	**10**	**88**	8.8	19	0
2006	NE	**16**	3	27	117	4.3	**35**	0	7	34	4.9	11	1
2007	NE	**16**	1	34	121	3.6	11	**3**	4	43	10.8	**29**	0
2008	NE	**16**	4	11	23	2.1	4	0	3	59	**19.7**	28	0
2009	NO	6	5	5	16	3.2	6	1	**10**	70	7.0	13	**2**
2010	NO	**16**	**6**	2	2	1.0	2	0	7	41	5.9	18	1
		143	23	164	579	3.5	35	4	57	439	7.7	29	4

=== Playoffs ===
Year	Team	Games		Rushing					Receiving				
Year	Team	GP	GS	Att	Yds	Avg	Lng	TD	Rec	Yds	Avg	Lng	TD
2003	SEA	1	0	0	0	0.0	0	0	0	0	0.0	0	0
2004	SEA	1	0	0	0	0.0	0	0	0	0	0.0	0	0
2005	NE	1	0	0	0	0.0	0	0	1	3	3.0	3	0
2006	NE	**3**	0	2	4	2.0	**4**	0	**4**	**33**	8.3	**15**	0
2007	NE	**3**	0	**3**	**9**	**3.0**	**4**	0	1	13	**13.0**	13	0
2010	NO	1	0	0	0	0.0	0	0	**4**	23	5.8	8	**1**
		10	0	5	13	2.6	4	0	10	72	7.2	15	1

== Broadcasting career ==
Evans was an analyst on NFL Network and joined the NFL on Fox as a game analyst in 2012 with Sam Rosen.

On December 12, 2017, Evans, along with Marshall Faulk and Ike Taylor, was suspended from the NFL Network after sexual harassment accusations against them were made.

On August 9, 2018, Evans released a statement that he was fired from the NFL Network after refusing to sign a "silencing agreement."

== Personal ==
Evans has two daughters, Ava and Naomi; they reside in Manhattan Beach, CA.

In September 2017, Evans launched an Athletic Performance Coaching and Fitness Apparel website.

He married Christine Porter on August 21, 2020.
