= Emmanuel Lamur =

American football player (born 1989)

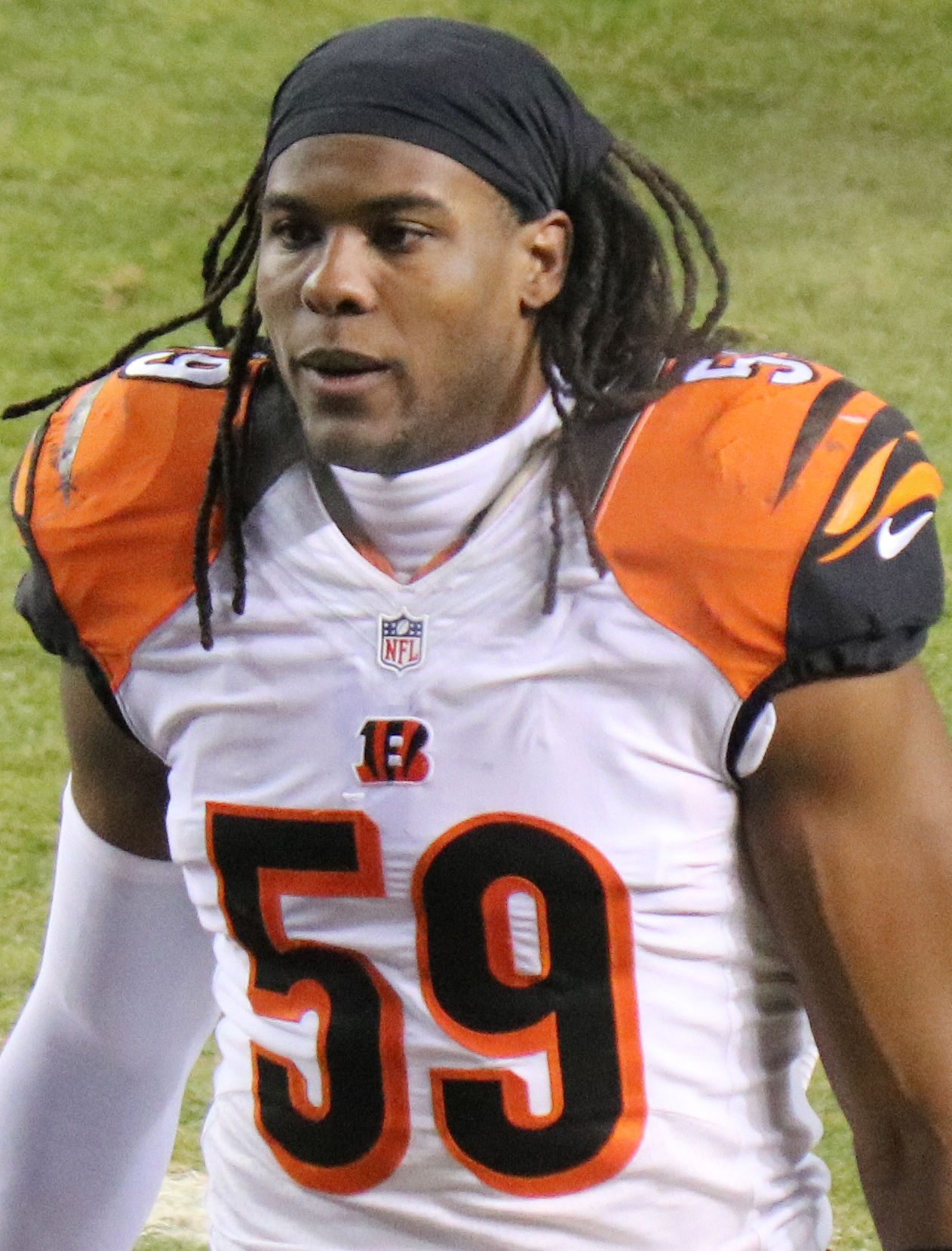
- Lamur with the Cincinnati Bengals in 2015

No. 59, 57, 54
- Position: Linebacker

Personal information
- Born: June 8, 1989 (age 37); Delray Beach, U.S.
- Listed height: 6 ft 5 in (1.96 m)
- Listed weight: 245 lb (111 kg)

Career information
- High school: The King's Academy (West Palm Beach)
- College: Independence CC (2008); Kansas State (2009–2011)
- NFL draft: 2012: undrafted

Career history
- Cincinnati Bengals (2012–2015); Minnesota Vikings (2016–2017); Oakland Raiders (2018); New York Jets (2018)

Career NFL statistics
- Total tackles: 193
- Sacks: 0.5
- Forced fumbles: 1
- Fumble recoveries: 2
- Interceptions: 2
- Stats at Pro Football Reference

Emmanuel Andrew Lamur (born June 8, 1989) is an American former professional football player who was a linebacker in the National Football League (NFL). He was signed by the Cincinnati Bengals as an undrafted free agent in 2012. He played college football for the Kansas State Wildcats.

== Early life ==
While attending The King's Academy in West Palm Beach, Florida, Lamur lettered in football and track and led the Lions to an 8–4 record as a senior, recording 70 tackles, three interceptions, and two forced fumbles. He earned All-Palm Beach County honors and received an All-State honorable mention for his efforts.

As a freshman in 2008 at Independence Community College, Lamur had 45 tackles in nine games, with one sack and two interceptions, earning an All-Conference second-team selection.

Regarded as a three-star recruit at safety by Rivals.com, Lamur committed to Kansas State University on January 18, 2009, choosing the Wildcats over scholarship offers from Arkansas, Ole Miss, Miami, Missouri, North Carolina, South Florida, UCF, Arizona State, Kansas and Ohio.

== College career ==
Lamur played college football at Kansas State University from 2009 to 2011. He finished his college career with 197 tackles, 2 sacks, 5 interceptions, 16 pass deflections, and 2 forced fumbles.

In his sophomore year with the Wildcats, he had 68 tackles, 3 interceptions, and 5 pass deflections. Lamur also blocked a field goal against Iowa State that ended the game.

In his junior year, Lamur had 46 tackles, an interception, 2 sacks, and 3 pass deflections.

In his senior year, he had 83 tackles, 8 pass deflections, 2 forced fumbles, and an interception.

== Professional career ==
Pre-draft measurables
| Height | Weight | 40-yard dash | 10-yard split | 20-yard split | 20-yard shuttle | Three-cone drill | Vertical jump | Broad jump | Bench press |
|---|---|---|---|---|---|---|---|---|---|
| 6 ft 4 1/8 in (1.93 m) | 232 lb (105 kg) | 4.63 s | 1.57 s | 2.64 s | 4.28 s | 7.30 s | 34 in (0.86 m) | 9 ft 9 in (2.97 m) | 20 reps |
All values from Pro Day

=== Cincinnati Bengals ===
==== 2012 ====
Lamur went undrafted in the 2012 NFL draft and did not receive any contract offers to sign as an undrafted free agent immediately after the draft concluded. Lamur received an invitation to try out for the Cincinnati Bengals and attend rookie minicamp. On May 14, 2012, the Bengals signed Lamur to a three-year, $1.44 million contract.

During training camp, he competed for a roster spot as a backup outside linebacker against Dontay Moch, Micah Johnson, Dan Skuta, and Brandon Joyner. On August 31, 2012, Lamur was released as part of the Bengals' final roster cuts. The next day, the Bengals signed Lamur to their practice squad. On November 2, 2012, he was promoted to the active roster after the team placed Dontay Moch on the season-ending reserve non-football injury list. Head coach Marvin Lewis named Lamur the fifth outside linebacker on the depth chart, behind Manny Lawson, Vontaze Burfict, Dan Skuta, and Vincent Rey.

The following Sunday, November 4, 2012, Lamur made his professional regular season debut and recorded three combined tackles and broke up a pass during a 31–23 loss to the Denver Broncos in Week 9. The next week, Lamur collected a season-high six combined tackles in the Bengals' 31–13 victory against the New York Giants in Week 10. He finished his rookie season in 2012 with 19 combined tackles (ten solo) and a pass deflection in nine games and no starts.

The Bengals finished second in the AFC North in 2012 with an 11–5 record and earned a wildcard berth. On January 5, 2013, Lamur appeared in his first career playoff game, made his first career start, in place of Manny Lawson, and recorded two combined tackles in the Bengals' 19–13 loss at the Houston Texans in the AFC Wildcard Game.

==== 2013 ====
During training camp in 2013, Lamur competed for a job as a backup outside linebacker against Aaron Maybin, Sean Porter, Jayson DiManche, Vincent Rey, Brandon Joiner, and Bruce Taylor. On August 30, 2013, Lamur was carted off the field due to a shoulder injury he suffered while tackling Donald Brown in the Bengals' 27–10 win against the Indianapolis Colts on their fourth preseason game. The following day, the Bengals placed Lamur on season-ending injured reserve due to a dislocated shoulder.

==== 2014 ====
Lamur entered training camp as a possible replacement for James Harrison at strongside linebacker. He competed against Jayson DiManche and Brandon Joiner. Head coach Marvin Lewis named Lamur the starting strongside linebacker to begin the regular season, alongside Vontaze Burfict and middle linebacker Rey Maualuga.

He started in the Bengals' season-opener at the Baltimore Ravens and recorded ten combined tackles (five solo), deflected a pass, and intercepted a pass by Joe Flacco in the third quarter of their 23–16 victory. Lamur was inactive during the Bengals' Week 7 loss at the Indianapolis Colts due to a shoulder injury. In Week 10, he collected a season-high 11 combined tackles (five solo) in a 24–3 loss to the Cleveland Browns. In Week 15, Lamur sustained a hamstring injury during a 30–0 win at the Cleveland Browns. His injury sidelined him for the Bengals' Week 16 victory against the Denver Broncos. He finished the 2014 NFL season with 91 combined tackles (53 solo), seven pass deflections, two interceptions in 14 games and 13 starts.

==== 2015 ====
In 2015, Lamur played in the first six games of the season, collecting 19 tackles, a shared sack, one pass defended and a special teams fumble recovery. In Week 2 against the San Diego Chargers, he recovered a muffed punt by Keenan Allen in the first quarter that set up a Bengals touchdown for a 7–0 lead. On October 11 against the Seattle Seahawks, he was credited with three tackles, and teamed with defensive end Carlos Dunlap to sack Seahawks quarterback Russell Wilson for an eight-yard loss on a third down situation late in the fourth quarter. The following week at Buffalo, he logged a season-high six tackles in the Bengals' win over the Bills 34–21.

=== Minnesota Vikings ===
Lamur signed with the Minnesota Vikings on March 9, 2016, reuniting him with former defensive coordinator, Mike Zimmer, who at that time was the Vikings' head coach.

=== Oakland Raiders ===
On March 21, 2018, Lamur signed with the Oakland Raiders, reuniting him with former Bengals defensive coordinator Paul Guenther. He played in nine games, starting four, before being waived on December 18, 2018.

=== New York Jets ===
On December 19, 2018, Lamur was claimed off waivers by the New York Jets.

== Career statistics ==
=== NFL ===
| Season | | Games | | Tackles | | | | | Interceptions | | | | | | Fumbles | | |
| Year | Team | GP | GS | Comb | Total | Ast | Sck | Sfty | PDef | Int | Yds | Avg | Lng | TDs | FF | FR | YDS |
|---|---|---|---|---|---|---|---|---|---|---|---|---|---|---|---|---|---|
| 2012 | Cincinnati Bengals | 9 | 0 | 19 | 10 | 9 | 0.0 | -- | 3 | 0 | 0 | 0.0 | 0 | 0 | 0 | 0 | 0 |
| 2014 | Cincinnati Bengals | 14 | 13 | 91 | 53 | 38 | 0.0 | -- | 7 | 2 | 6 | 3.0 | 5 | 0 | 0 | 0 | 0 |
| 2015 | Cincinnati Bengals | 16 | 2 | 40 | 27 | 13 | 0.5 | -- | 1 | 0 | 0 | 0.0 | 0 | 0 | 1 | 0 | 0 |
| 2016 | Minnesota Vikings | 16 | 0 | 13 | 5 | 8 | 0.0 | -- | 0 | 0 | 0 | 0.0 | 0 | 0 | 0 | 0 | 0 |
| 2017 | Minnesota Vikings | 16 | 0 | 17 | 9 | 8 | 0.0 | -- | 1 | 0 | 0 | 0.0 | 0 | 0 | 0 | 1 | 0 |
| Total | | 71 | 15 | 180 | 104 | 76 | 0.5 | -- | 12 | 2 | 6 | 3.0 | 5 | 0 | 1 | 1 | 0 |

=== College ===
| Regular season statistics | | | | Tackles | | | | | Interceptions | | | | | | Fumbles | | | |
| Season | Team | GP | GS | Comb | Total | Ast | Sck | Tfl | PDef | Int | Yds | Avg | Lng | TDs | FF | FR | FR YDS | TDs |
|---|---|---|---|---|---|---|---|---|---|---|---|---|---|---|---|---|---|---|
| 2009 | Kansas State | 12 | 12 | 68 | 44 | 24 | 0.0 | 1.0 | 5 | 3 | 31 | 10.3 | 0 | 0 | 0 | 0 | 0 | 0 |
| 2010 | Kansas State | 12 | 12 | 46 | 23 | 23 | 2.0 | 3.0 | 3 | 1 | 10 | 10.0 | 0 | 0 | 0 | 0 | 0 | 0 |
| 2011 | Kansas State | 13 | 13 | 83 | 67 | 57 | 0.0 | 6.0 | 8 | 1 | 15 | 15.0 | 0 | 0 | 2 | 0 | 0 | 0 |
| Totals | | 37 | 37 | 197 | 114 | 83 | 2.0 | 10.0 | 16 | 5 | 56 | 11.2 | 0 | 0 | 2 | 0 | 0 | 0 |

== Personal life ==
Lamur is of Haitian descent. He is the twin brother of football player Sammuel Lamur. Lamur has been nicknamed as "E-Man" by his teammates and family. He married singer Julia Lamur
