= Jarrod Saltalamacchia =

American baseball player (born 1985)

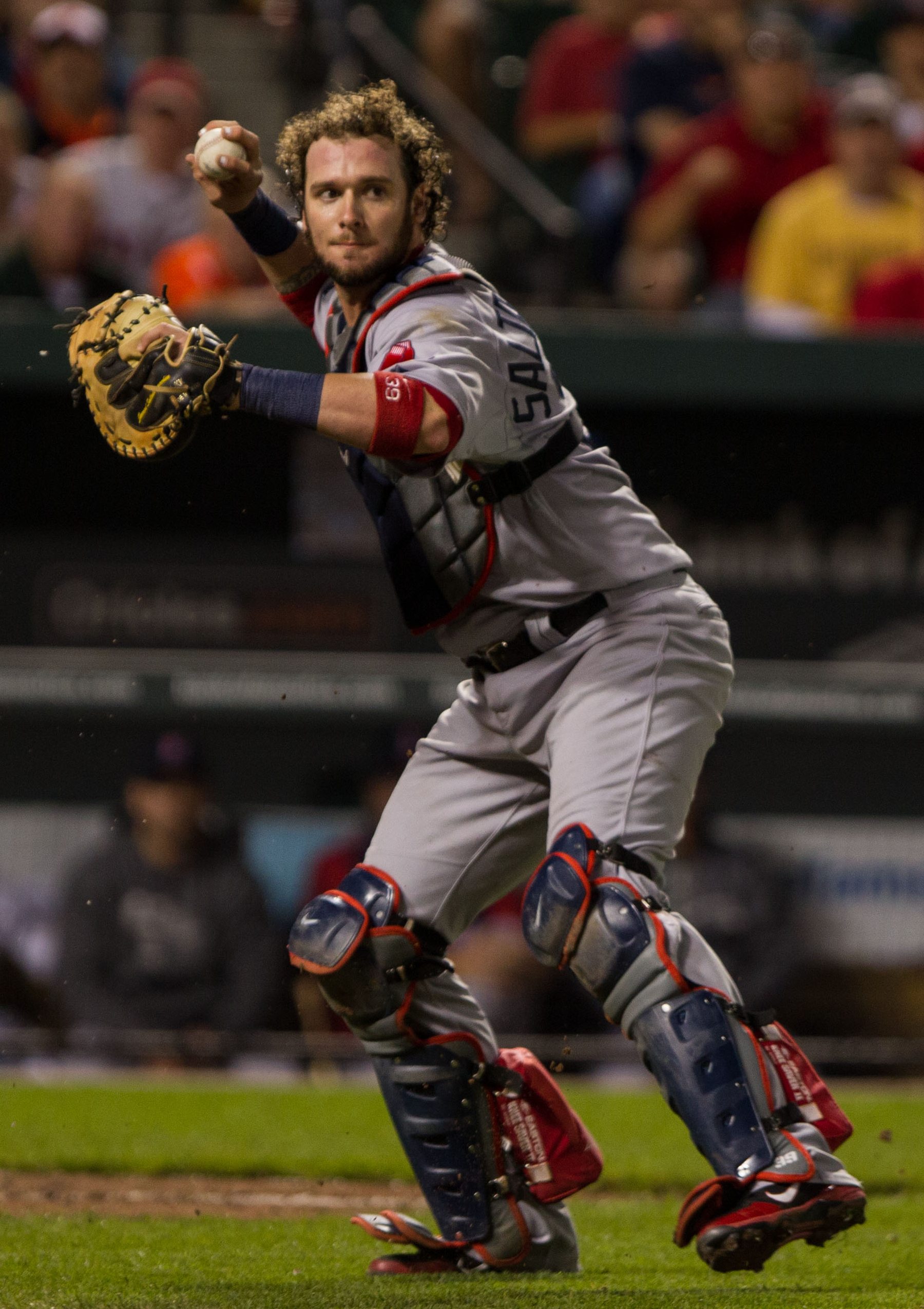
- Saltalamacchia with the Boston Red Sox in 2012
- Catcher
- Born: May 2, 1985 (age 41); West Palm Beach, Florida, U.S.
- Batted: Switch Threw: Right

MLB debut
- May 2, 2007, for the Atlanta Braves

Last MLB appearance
- September 29, 2018, for the Detroit Tigers

MLB statistics
- Batting average: .232
- Home runs: 110
- Runs batted in: 381
- Stats at Baseball Reference

Teams
- Atlanta Braves (2007); Texas Rangers (2007–2010); Boston Red Sox (2010–2013); Miami Marlins (2014–2015); Arizona Diamondbacks (2015); Detroit Tigers (2016); Toronto Blue Jays (2017); Detroit Tigers (2018)

Career highlights and awards
- World Series champion (2013)
Medals
Men's baseball
Representing United States
World Junior Baseball Championship
Bronze medal – third place	2002 Sherbrooke	Team

Jarrod Scott Saltalamacchia (/ˌsɒltələˈmɑːkiə/; born May 2, 1985) is an American former professional baseball catcher. Between 2007 and 2018, he played in Major League Baseball (MLB) for the Atlanta Braves, Texas Rangers, Boston Red Sox, Miami Marlins, Arizona Diamondbacks, Detroit Tigers, and Toronto Blue Jays. In August 2025, he was named the Director of Program Development for the Miami Hurricanes baseball program.

Raised in West Palm Beach, Florida, Saltalamacchia attended Royal Palm Beach High School. His performance on the institution's baseball team drew the attention of scouts, and the Braves selected him in the first round of the 2003 MLB draft. He spent four years in the Braves' farm system, but in 2007, injuries to both of Atlanta's regular catchers forced them to call him up to the major leagues. Saltalamacchia was prevented from becoming a regular catcher for the Braves by the presence of Brian McCann, and so he became the centerpiece of a trading deadline deal with the Rangers in 2007. Shortly after becoming the team's starting catcher in 2009, a bout of thoracic outlet syndrome forced Saltalamacchia to undergo season-ending rib removal surgery, and lingering issues from the surgery caused him to suffer from the "yips" in 2010.

The Rangers traded Saltalamacchia to the Red Sox in 2010, and he continued to suffer from health issues that limited his play. Under the mentorship of Jason Varitek, however, Saltalamacchia began to improve, and he succeeded Varitek as the team's starting catcher in 2012. While Saltalamacchia had a breakout season in 2013, he was benched for the final stretch of the 2013 World Series after a missed play caused the Red Sox to lose Game 3. The following year, he signed with the Marlins as a free agent, but his production declined, and he was released from the team in May 2015.

Saltalamacchia batted just .171 with the Tigers in 2016. Most of his time with Toronto and Detroit over the next two seasons was spent with their Triple-A affiliates, where he helped mentor pitching and catching prospects like Grayson Greiner. Saltalamacchia announced his retirement from baseball in January 2019, citing a desire to spend more time with his family. Since then, he has served as a baseball coach for The King's Academy in Florida and has filled in as a sports analyst for the New England Sports Network.

== Early life ==
Saltalamacchia was born on May 2, 1985, in West Palm Beach, Florida. He attended Royal Palm Beach High School, where he caught for his friend and future Major League Baseball (MLB) teammate Kason Gabbard. In 2000, they helped the Royal Palm team reach the state tournament. His father wanted Saltalamacchia to play football, but he was singularly focused on baseball. By his junior year, he was drawing interest from MLB scouts.

== Professional career ==
=== Draft and minor leagues ===
The Atlanta Braves selected Saltalamacchia in the supplemental first round, 36th overall, of the 2003 MLB draft. On June 3, 2003, he agreed to a contract with the team for a signing bonus of $950,000, and he spent his first season of professional baseball with the Rookie-level Gulf Coast League (GCL) Braves. At the time, he had committed to play college baseball for the Florida State Seminoles, but college coach Mike Martin told him, "If you go first round, take your money and go." In 46 games, Saltalamacchia batted .239 with two home runs and 14 runs batted in (RBIs) in 134 at-bats. After helping take the team to a GCL championship title, Saltalamacchia was promoted to the Class A Rome Braves for the 2004 season. In 91 games there, Saltalamacchia batted .272, recording 10 home runs and 51 RBIs in 323 at-bats.

2005 proved to be a breakout year for Saltalamacchia, who was named the Myrtle Beach Pelicans' Most Valuable Player, as well as the top prospect in the Class A-Advanced Carolina League, by batting .314, hitting 19 home runs, and setting a club single-season record with 81 RBIs. After the conclusion of the regular Minor League Baseball season, Saltalamacchia was one of two Pelicans selected to play for the Phoenix Desert Dogs of the Arizona Fall League, alongside outfielder Josh Burrus. In an additional 21 fall league games, Saltalamacchia batted .288, adding one home run and eight RBIs to his season totals.

Entering the 2006 season as one of Atlanta's top prospects, Saltalamacchia was assigned to the Double-A Mississippi Braves. He had what Braves manager Bobby Cox referred to as "an off year" in Mississippi: despite flashes of strong batting in July and August, his overall average for the year was only .230, with nine home runs and 39 RBIs. He stayed in Mississippi to begin the 2007 season, with the anticipation that he would be promoted to the Triple-A Richmond Braves at some point in the year. Saltalamacchia also made another Arizona Fall League appearance in 2006, going 13-for-23 in six games with the Peoria Javelinas.

=== Atlanta Braves (2007) ===
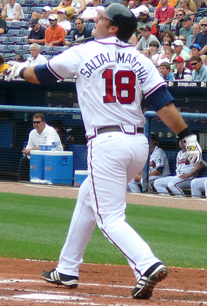
Saltalamacchia with the Braves in 2007

With both starting catcher Brian McCann and backup Brayan Peña injured during a game against the Philadelphia Phillies, Saltalamacchia was called up to Atlanta on May 2, 2007, his 22nd birthday. He made his MLB debut that same night, getting on base twice with a walk and a hit by pitch. Four days later, Saltalamacchia recorded both his first major league hit and RBI in a 6–4 win over the Los Angeles Dodgers. The latter hit, which came off of a pitch from Saltalamacchia's childhood friend Chad Billingsley, helped bring home Andruw Jones to give the Braves the lead. His first home run came on May 27, with a solo shot off of the Phillies' Cole Hamels. Exactly one month later, while filling in at first base to make room for McCann behind the plate, Saltalamacchia recorded his first multi-home run game, with third- and fifth-inning solo shots against Mike Bacsik of the Washington Nationals. In 47 major league games with Atlanta, Saltalamacchia batted .284 with four home runs and 12 RBIs in 141 at-bats.

=== Texas Rangers (2007–10) ===
Despite his strong performance in the minors, Saltalamacchia was essentially blocked from becoming an Atlanta staple by McCann, who received his second consecutive All-Star selection in 2007. This made Saltalamacchia an attractive piece for the MLB trading deadline. On July 31, 2007, Saltalamacchia was the centerpiece of a five-prospect deal with the Texas Rangers in exchange for Mark Teixeira. Alongside Saltalamacchia, Neftalí Feliz, Elvis Andrus, Matt Harrison, and Beau Jones were sent to Texas in order for Atlanta to receive Teixeira. Shortly after joining the team, Saltalamacchia contributed two home runs and seven RBIs in the Rangers' 30–3 rout of the Baltimore Orioles. It was the first time that a team had scored 30 or more runs in a game since the Chicago Colts defeated the Louisville Colonels on June 29, 1897. Saltalamacchia played in 46 games for the Rangers in 2007, batting .251 with 21 RBIs in 167 at-bats. Additionally, his seven home runs set a new single-season record for Texas rookie catchers.

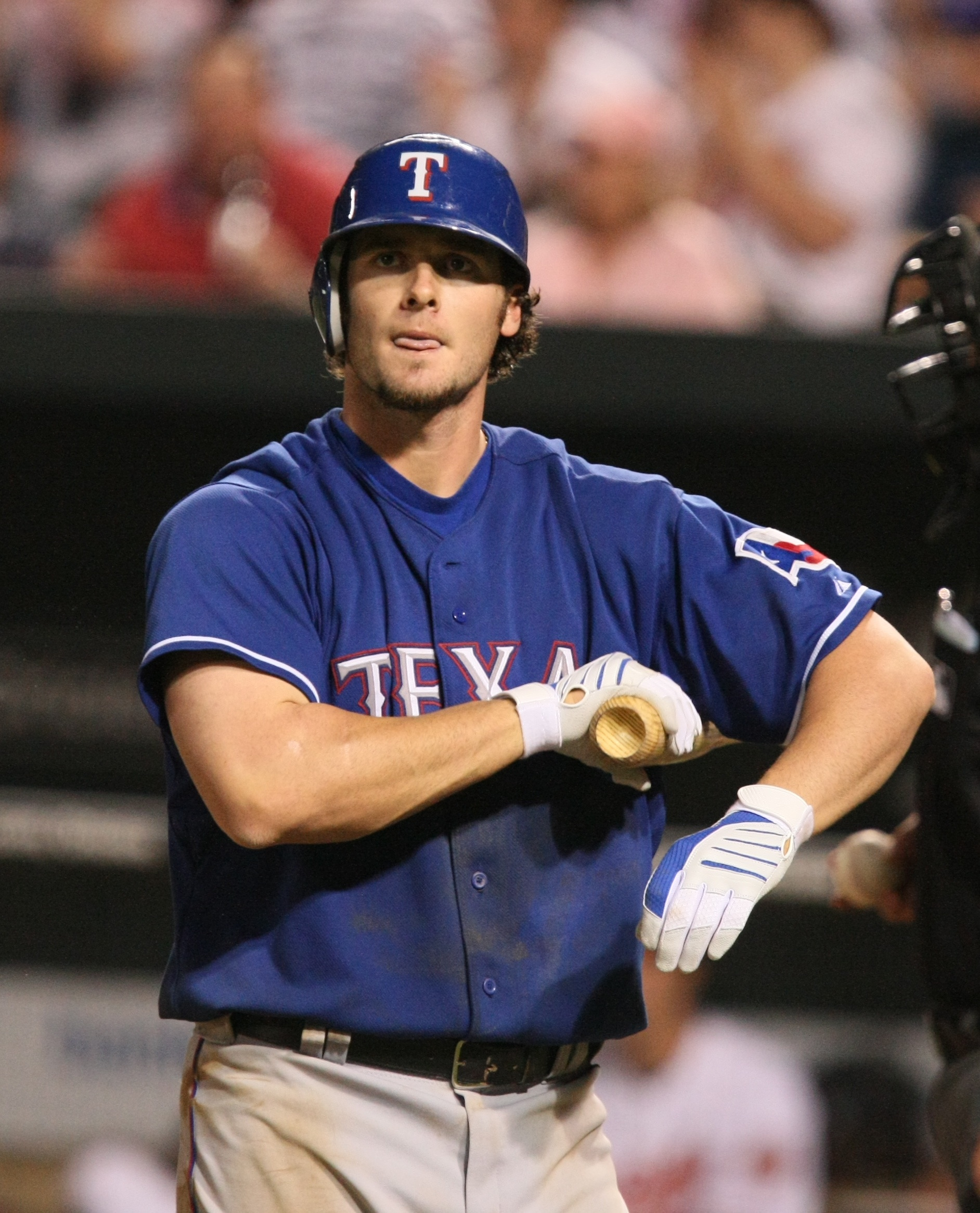
Saltalamacchia with the Rangers in 2009

After battling with Gerald Laird for the starting catcher job in spring training, Saltalamacchia was optioned to the Triple-A Oklahoma City RedHawks for the start of the 2008 season. His time in the minors was limited, however, as he was called up on April 25 to replace Adam Melhuse, who was released from his contract after breaking a bone in the back of his hand during a game against the Detroit Tigers. Saltalamacchia played in 61 games that season, batting .253 with three home runs and 26 RBIs. One of those home runs was Saltalamacchia's first career grand slam, which helped lift the Rangers to a 13–9 victory over the Cleveland Indians on May 23, 2008. Laird recalled later that Saltalamacchia struggled with the pressure placed on him both by himself and by the Rangers, and that "[s]ometimes you could see he wasn't being himself". His season came to an end on September 1, when an injured elbow forced the Rangers to shut him down. After the regular season ended, Saltalamacchia spent time with the Leones del Escogido of the Dominican Winter League, batting .364 with nine home runs and 21 RBIs in 20 games before returning home.

The Rangers traded Laird to the Tigers after the 2008 season, leaving the starting catcher role open for 2009. Saltalamacchia earned the position out of spring training after Taylor Teagarden showed poor pitch blocking and stamina and Max Ramírez suffered an injury. His time at the position was hindered, however, by tingling and numbness in Saltalamacchia's throwing arm and hand that got increasingly worse as the season went on. The symptoms worsened to the point that Saltalamacchia had to leave a game in the fourth inning, and he was placed on the 15-day disabled list on August 15. The symptoms were ultimately traced back to a car accident that Saltalamacchia had survived in June: the collision caused Saltalamacchia's top rib to pinch a nerve, a condition known as thoracic outlet syndrome, and he required surgery to remove the bone. Saltalamacchia was limited to only 84 games during the 2009 season, during which he batted .233 with nine home runs and 34 RBIs. He attempted to play once more in the Dominican Winter Leagues but had to be shut down after experiencing shoulder discomfort.

Saltalamacchia opened the 2010 MLB season with the fourth opening day walk-off win in Rangers history, driving in David Murphy with an RBI single to defeat the Toronto Blue Jays 5–4. The back pain and shoulder inflammation that had bothered him during spring training, however, had returned in full by the second game of the season, and Saltalamacchia was placed on the 15-day disabled list on April 8 with upper back stiffness. After returning from the injury, Saltalamacchia showed difficulties both batting and catching, and he was sent to the Triple-A Oklahoma City RedHawks to isolate and remedy the mechanical issues with his play. Saltalamacchia also struggled mentally, with a bout of the "yips" preventing him from making accurate throws back to the pitcher. He was frustrated with his inability to make what should be a simple throw, saying that it was "the only thing keeping [him] from being back in the big leagues". Saltalamacchia spent most of his time with the Rangers organization that season in Oklahoma City, where he batted .244 in 238 at-bats, with 11 home runs and 33 RBIs in 63 games.

=== Boston Red Sox (2010–13) ===
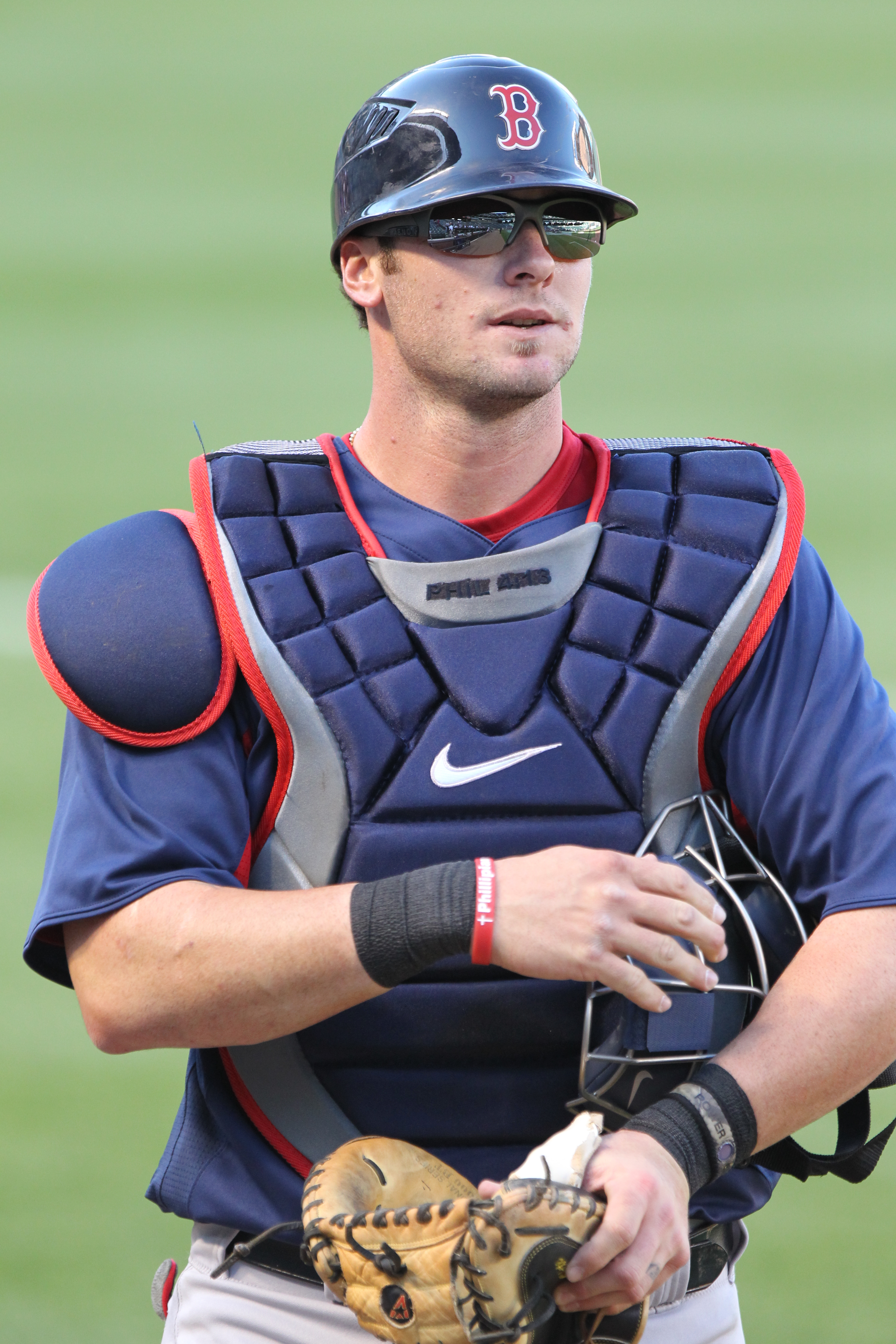
Saltalamacchia with the Red Sox in 2011

On July 31, 2010, the Rangers traded Saltalamacchia to the Boston Red Sox in exchange for prospects Román Méndez and Chris McGuinness, $350,000 in cash, and a player to be named later. After the trade was finalized, he was assigned to the Triple-A Pawtucket Red Sox as one of multiple potential replacements for the veteran Jason Varitek. When Kevin Cash was placed on the disabled list with a hamstring injury on August 11, Saltalamacchia was called up to start behind the plate, with regular catcher Víctor Martínez filling in for Cash at first base. His stint was short-lived, as Saltalamacchia was placed on the 15-day disabled list on August 19 after a sore leg turned out to be infected. He had only 13 at-bats after returning from the infection before going down with a torn ligament in his left thumb. The ligament required surgery and 4–6 weeks of recovery, and Saltalamacchia was shut down for the season on September 28, 2010. He appeared in only 10 games for the Red Sox that season, going 3-for-19 in the process, but manager Terry Francona said that he was "kind of excited about" the limited action that Saltalamacchia did see.

After Martínez signed with the Detroit Tigers as a free agent during the 2010–11 offseason, Saltalamacchia inherited the starting catcher position for Boston. The Red Sox had a slow start to the season, and troubles with both Saltalamacchia's swing and the performance of his batterymates led to rumors that Varitek would gain more time behind the plate. As the season progressed, Saltalamacchia became more comfortable catching for Boston. He took the general advice on how to call a game from pitching coach Bob McClure, while Varitek taught Saltalamacchia how to handle the individual personalities of members of the Red Sox' starting rotation like Josh Beckett, John Lackey, and Jon Lester. This comfort appeared to translate to Saltalamacchia's batting as well: by the start of August, he had already set career highs in runs, doubles, triples, home runs, RBIs, walks, slugging percentage, and on-base plus slugging (OPS). Saltalamacchia played in 103 games for Boston in 2011, closing out the season with a .235 batting average, a .450 slugging percentage, a .288 on-base percentage (OBP), 16 home runs, 56 RBIs, and 52 runs scored in 358 at-bats.

On January 15, 2012, Saltalamacchia avoided contract arbitration when the Red Sox signed him to a new one-year, $2.5 million deal. With Varitek's offseason retirement, Saltalamacchia became the de facto leader of Boston's "Wolf Pack" of catchers, a group that also included Kelly Shoppach, Ryan Lavarnway, and Luis Exposito. The veteran Shoppach joined Saltalamacchia as a mentor for the team, both with the younger catchers and with the Red Sox pitching staff. While Saltalamacchia served as the everyday catcher for Boston, Shoppach would frequently get the nod against left-handed pitchers, against whom Saltalamacchia was less effective. After the first half of the season saw Saltalamacchia make an All-Star case with 15 home runs and a .537 slugging percentage, he seemed to collapse in August, finishing the year with 139 strikeouts in 405 at-bats. In 121 games for the Red Sox in 2012, Saltalamacchia batted .273, with 65 RBIs and 58 runs scored. He put up middling offensive numbers for the season, with a .288 OBP and 1.2 Wins Above Replacement, but his 25 home runs were one short of the single-season franchise record among catchers, which was set by Carlton Fisk in both 1973 and 1977. His troubles were more defensive: only 18.4 percent of attempted runners were caught stealing by Saltalamacchia, down from 30.8 percent the previous year, and he struggled to call games: Red Sox pitchers in 2012 had a combined 4.84 earned run average (ERA) with Saltalamacchia behind the plate, compared to 4.51 with other catchers.

The offseason signing of veteran catcher David Ross placed Saltalamacchia in competition with Lavarnway for the remaining position behind the plate. Boston general manager Ben Cherington ultimately optioned Lavarnway to Triple-A, keeping Ross and Saltalamacchia as his major league catching staff for the 2013 season. The season turned out to be the most offensively impressive of Saltalamacchia's career, as he set new career highs with a .273 batting average, a .338 OBP, a .466 slugging percentage, 68 runs scored, 40 doubles, 65 RBIs, and 43 walks. Saltalamacchia also helped take the Red Sox to the postseason for the first time since he joined the team, both through his own offensive performance and by helping to coach the Red Sox' young pitching staff. Saltalamacchia recorded a walk-off RBI single in Game 2 of the 2013 American League Championship Series, bringing home Jonny Gomes to take the game 6–5, right after the Red Sox had tied the game with a grand slam, making him one of the unsung heroes of their postseason. Saltalamacchia's success did not continue into the 2013 World Series, as a wild throw to third base in Game 3 was called as "obstruction", allowing Allen Craig of the St. Louis Cardinals to take a run and win the game 5–4. He was benched for the remainder of the series, which the Red Sox won in six games, and Boston did not tender Jarrod Saltalamacchia a qualifying offer for the following season, leaving him a free agent.

=== Miami Marlins (2014–15) ===
After passing a physical exam, Saltalamacchia finalized a three-year, $21 million contract with the Miami Marlins, his hometown team, on December 9, 2013. The deal subsequently pushed Jeff Mathis to the backup role and Rob Brantly to the minors. The Marlins had been interested in signing Saltalamacchia to serve as a veteran starter who could carry the team while they waited for a promising catching prospect to emerge.

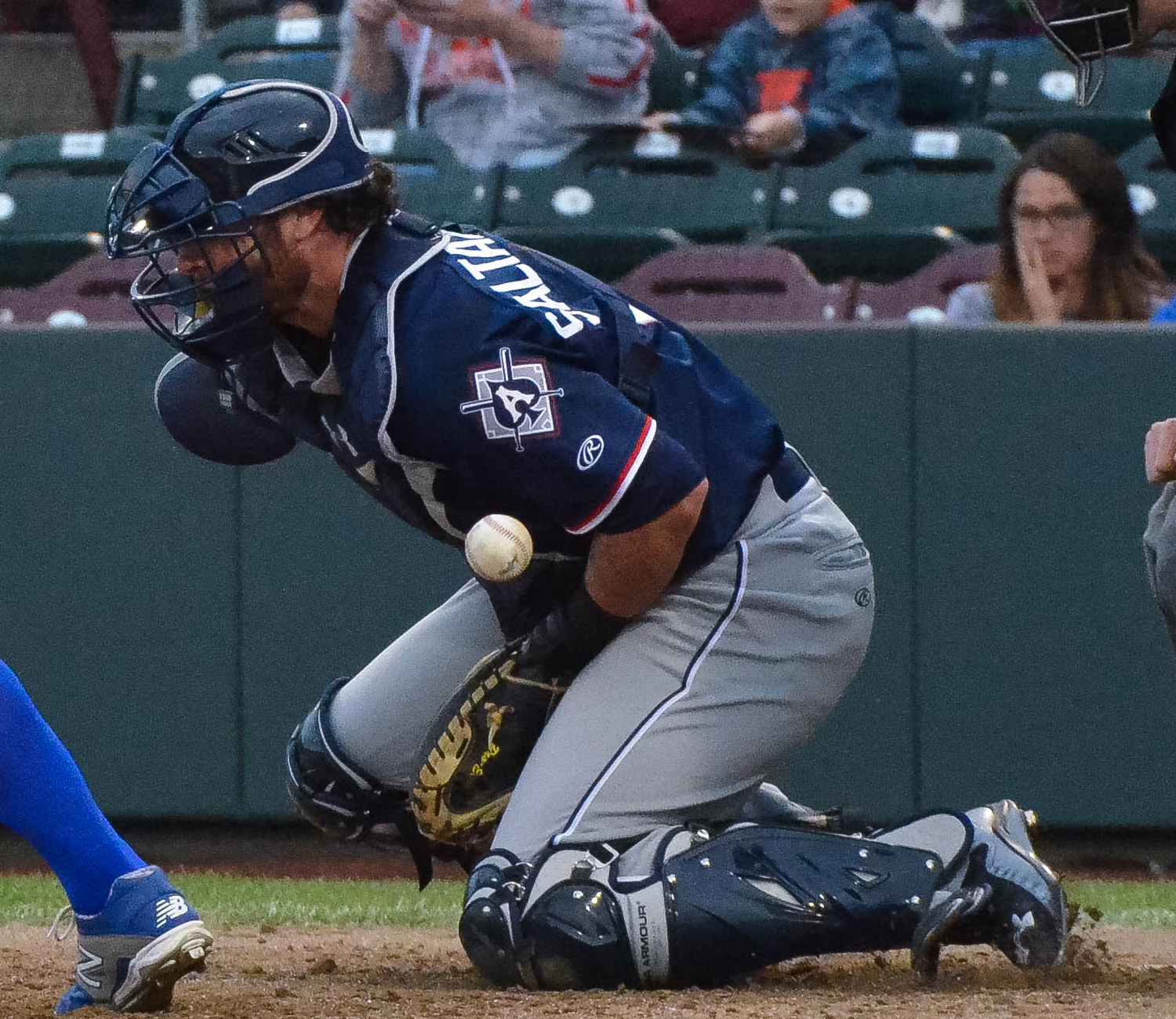
Saltalamacchia with the Marlins in 2015

After a hot streak to start the 2014 MLB season which saw Saltalamacchia record four home runs and seven RBIs in 11 games, he fell into a slump, going a career-high 0-for-26 before recording a hit against the San Francisco Giants on May 16. Amidst another 0-for-11 slump, Saltalamacchia was placed on the concussion list on June 1, with the Marlins electing not to disclose how he suffered the injury. While the catcher continued to disappoint in hit production, carrying a .220 average into the start of August, he managed to raise his on-base percentage to .329 by drawing 43 walks in that same time frame. In 114 games for the Marlins in 2014, Saltalamacchia batted .220, with 11 home runs and 44 RBIs in 373 at-bats. Despite striking out 143 times, he also recorded 55 walks in 435 plate appearances.

Saltalamacchia's difficulties continued into the 2015 season. He went 2-for-29 with 12 strikeouts, and his .289 on-base plus slugging was the lowest among MLB catchers by the time that he went on paternity leave in April. On April 27, Saltalamacchia was designated for assignment as the rookies moved J. T. Realmuto into the starting catcher role, with Jhonatan Solano acting as his backup. Although several teams expressed interest in claiming Saltalamacchia off of waivers, they were reluctant to inherit the remainder of his Marlins contract. On May 5, the Marlins released Saltalamacchia, an agreement that required them to pay the remaining $15 million on his initial $21 million contract.

=== Arizona Diamondbacks (2015) ===
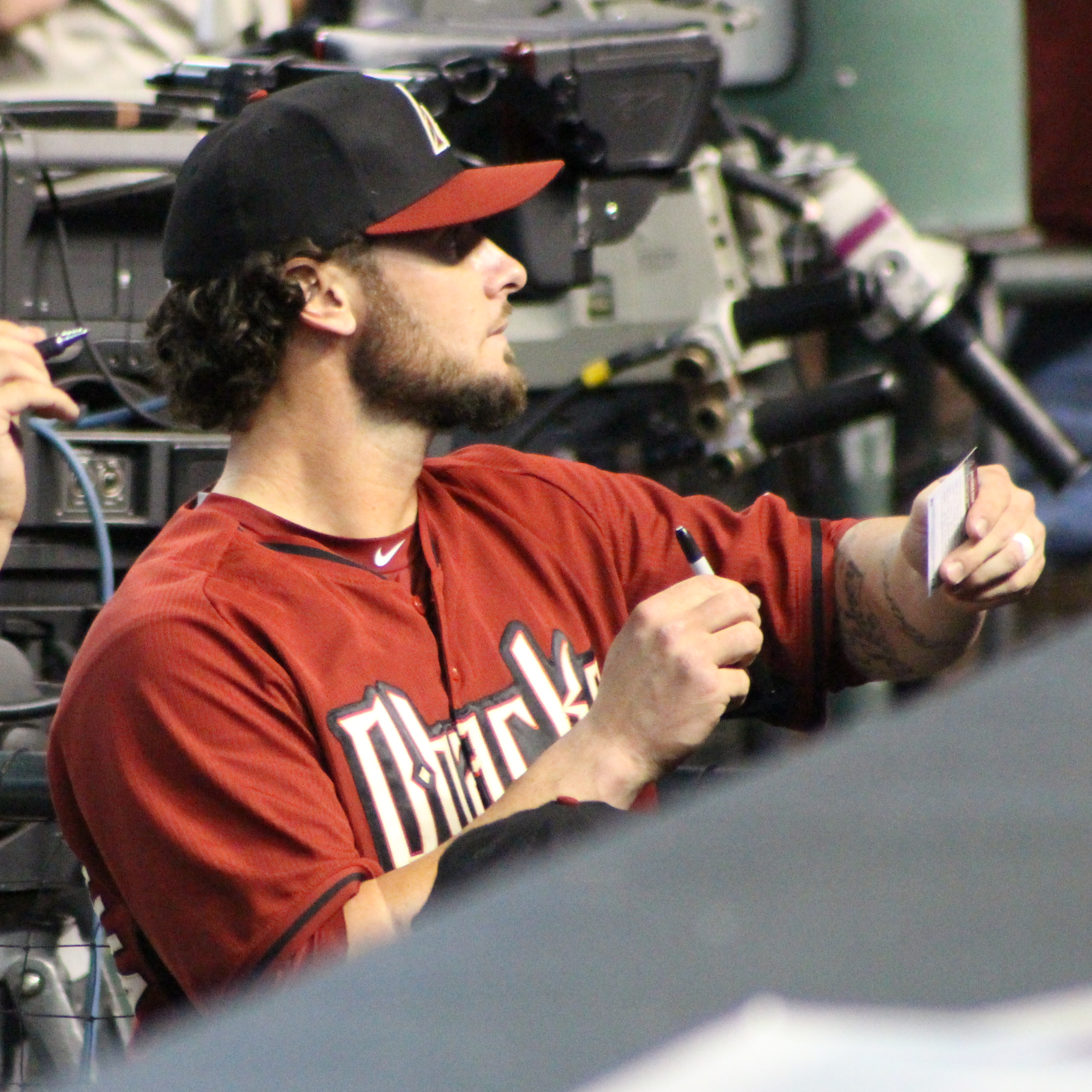
Saltalamacchia with the Diamondbacks in 2015

Two days after his release from the Marlins, Saltalamacchia signed a minor league contract with the Arizona Diamondbacks, a deal that would allow him to gain more at-bats in Triple-A before joining the rest of the team. He was meant to serve as the backup catcher for Tuffy Gosewisch, but after Gosewisch suffered a season-ending knee injury at the end of May, Saltalamacchia became the Diamondbacks' everyday catcher. While he adjusted to the role, he split time with new backup Jordan Pacheco. As the season progressed, the Diamondbacks settled into a three-catcher workload, with Saltalamacchia splitting time behind the plate with Oscar Hernández and Welington Castillo. At the end of the 2015 season, Saltalamacchia, who batted .251 in 70 games with eight home runs and 23 RBIs, became a free agent.

=== First stint with the Detroit Tigers (2016) ===
On December 6, 2015, Saltalamacchia signed a one-year contract with the Detroit Tigers. As the Marlins still owed him $8 million from the remainder of that contract, Detroit was allowed to sign Saltalamacchia for the minimum amount. Detroit was primarily interested in Saltalamacchia's switch-hitting abilities, as they were in need of more left-handed batters; defensively, he would serve as the backup catcher for other new acquisition James McCann. When McCann suffered a sprained ankle at the start of the season, Saltalamacchia received regular starting time, and he hit his 100th career home run on April 13, 2016, with a go-ahead grand slam in a 7–3 defeat of the Pittsburgh Pirates. After a strong offensive start which led Tigers manager Brad Ausmus to platoon his two catchers equally, Saltalamacchia fell into a slump as the season progressed, and the Tigers made no attempt to re-sign their backup catcher at the conclusion of the season. Although his offensive performance was middling, batting only .171 with 12 home runs and 38 RBIs in 92 games, Saltalamacchia's primary contribution to the Tigers was his clubhouse presence. He acted as a mentor to young pitchers Michael Fulmer and Matthew Boyd, serving also as Boyd's personal catcher.

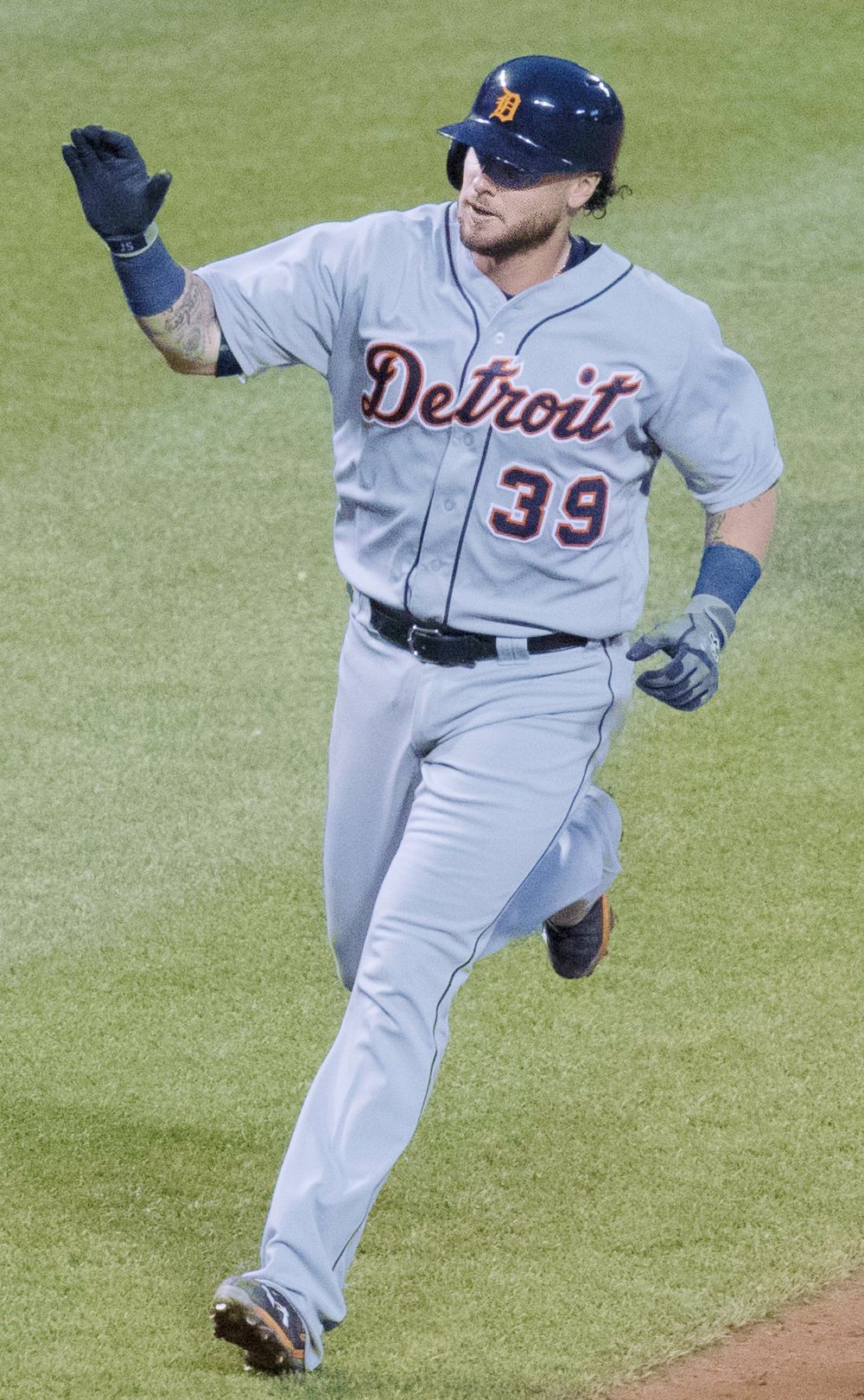
Saltalamacchia with the Tigers in 2016

=== Toronto Blue Jays (2017) ===
The Toronto Blue Jays signed Saltalamacchia to a minor league contract on February 6, 2017, with an invitation to spring training. He was ultimately named to the Blue Jays' opening day roster as a backup catcher for Russell Martin, and he got his first start of the season on April 7, catching for Francisco Liriano. After Saltalamacchia demonstrated difficulties at the plate, going 1-for-25 with 16 strikeouts in 10 games, the Jays recalled Luke Maile from the minors as his replacement. Saltalamacchia was released from the Blue Jays on May 3 but signed a new minor league contract two weeks later and was assigned to the Triple-A Buffalo Bisons. Saltalamacchia's offensive difficulties continued in the minor leagues, and after he batted .162 in 33 games, the Bisons released him on June 30, 2017. Saltalamacchia revealed later that his struggles at the plate were due in large part to the fact that his wife was undergoing health issues at home. As a result, his "mind wasn't there" during games. He spent the remainder of the season serving as a fill-in color commentator for the New England Sports Network (NESN).

=== Second stint with the Detroit Tigers (2018) ===
Leading into the 2018 MLB season, Saltalamacchia was contemplating leaving MLB for Nippon Professional Baseball in Japan, or for one of the independent baseball leagues in the United States. On March 9, 2018, however, Saltalamacchia signed a minor league contract with the Tigers, with the understanding that he would primarily play for the Triple-A Toledo Mud Hens and serve as "insurance" in case one of the major league catchers suffered an injury. He took on the unofficial role of clubhouse teacher with the Mud Hens, helping both the Tigers' pitching prospects and fellow Triple-A catcher Grayson Greiner develop their skills in preparation for an MLB promotion. Greiner and Saltalamacchia had a particular rapport with each other, referring to the other catcher as "Dad" or "Son", respectively. In 67 games with Toledo, Saltalamacchia batted .174, with five home runs and 28 RBIs in 218 at-bats. After Toledo was eliminated from the International League playoffs on September 8, Saltalamacchia was one of three Triple-A players added to the Tigers' expanded roster. He played in five major league games that season, going 0-for-7 with one walk and four strikeouts.

== Retirement ==
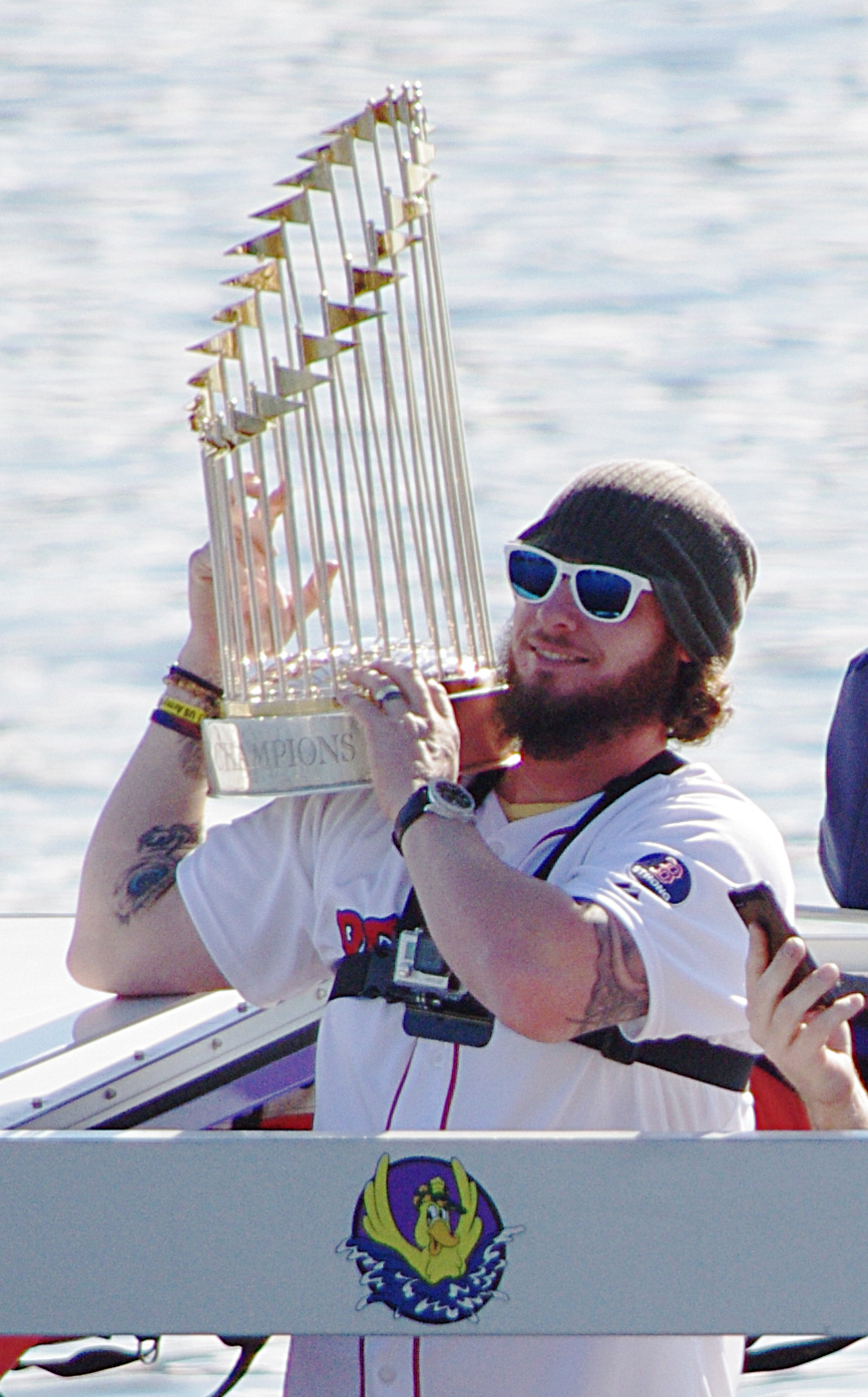
Saltalamacchia holding the trophy from the 2013 World Series

Saltalamacchia announced his retirement from baseball on January 28, 2019, after 12 years in Major League Baseball. He told reporter Ken Rosenthal of The Athletic that it was time to "hang up [his] gear and start the next chapter of [his] life", which involved spending more time with his family. Saltalamacchia finished his career with a .232 average, 110 home runs, and 381 RBIs.

After his retirement, Saltalamacchia was hired to coach the baseball team of The King's Academy in West Palm Beach. He took over the position from his former Rangers teammate Brad Wilkerson, who left the school to pursue other baseball opportunities. In addition to coaching The King's Academy, Saltalamacchia was hired by NESN to serve as a substitute sports commentator when the network's regular analysts were unavailable. In 2022, he joined the coaching staff of the Bourne Braves, a collegiate summer baseball team in the Cape Cod Baseball League. In 2024, he was named as the head coach of the Falmouth Commodores, another Cape League team.

== Personal life ==
Saltalamacchia married his wife Ashley on July 12, 2005. She was a gym teacher at Royal Palm Beach High School during his time as a student, but claims they did not begin dating until 2004, the year after he graduated. They have four daughters. He and his family are Christians, and he listed his strong faith as one of the reasons he decided to coach baseball at The King's Academy. The family lives in Wellington, Florida.

Fourteen letters long, Saltalamacchia had the longest last name in MLB history. The previous record-holder was Ossee Schreckengost, who played for the Red Sox in 1901. He was surpassed by Simeon Woods Richardson in 2022 with sixteen characters (including a space). Saltalamacchia is of Italian descent, as his last name translated literally means "jump over the thicket". Most of Saltalamacchia's teammates refer to him by the nickname "Salty".

Saltalamacchia was inducted to the Palm Beach County Sports Hall of Fame as part of the class of 2020–21.

Politically, Saltalamacchia has expressed several conservative beliefs. Although scheduling conflicts with the Marlins prevented Saltalamacchia from joining his World Series champion teammates on a celebratory visit to the White House, the catcher told reporters that he would have declined to attend regardless, as he did not support then-President Barack Obama. In 2016, Saltalamacchia expressed his disagreement with San Francisco 49ers player Colin Kaepernick's decision to take the knee during the playing of the U.S. national anthem prior to games. He referred to Kaepernick's kneeling as "pretty disgusting", and said that the football player "needs to go back to the history books and realize what the flag represents and what a lot of people have sacrificed for it". Later that season, Saltalamacchia wore a pair of cleats emblazoned with the American flag, with a sheriff's badge imprinted on one heel. The cleats were worn to show his support for the Palm Beach County Sheriff's Office and were auctioned off at a department charity event that November.
