= Colt Morton =

American baseball player (born 1982)

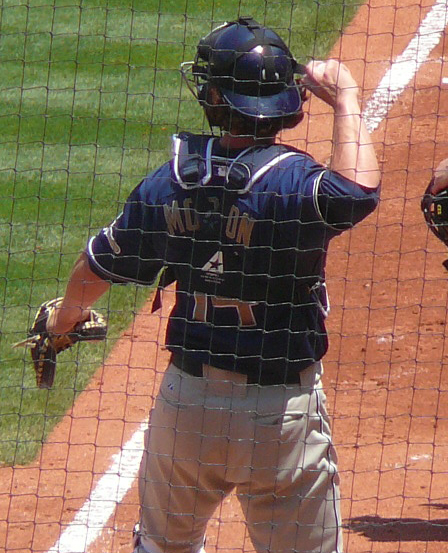
- Morton with the Padres in 2008
- Catcher
- Born: April 10, 1982 (age 44); Fort Lauderdale, Florida, U.S.
- Batted: Right Threw: Right

MLB debut
- September 21, 2007, for the San Diego Padres

Last MLB appearance
- May 8, 2008, for the San Diego Padres

MLB statistics
- Batting average: .063
- Home runs: 0
- Runs batted in: 1
- Stats at Baseball Reference

Teams
- San Diego Padres (2007–2008)

Kristopher Colt Morton (born April 10, 1982) is an American former Major League Baseball catcher who played for the San Diego Padres.

== Amateur career ==
While attending high school at The King's Academy in West Palm Beach, Florida, Morton lettered in baseball and led the team with a .339 batting average, eight home runs, and 26 RBI as a senior. He was a two-time All-State honoree, a preseason Louisville Slugger/TPX High School All-American, and received an All-American honorable mention from Collegiate Baseball for his efforts.

He attended North Carolina State University in Raleigh, North Carolina, and in 2002 he played collegiate summer baseball with the Chatham A's of the Cape Cod Baseball League. He was selected by the Padres in the third round of the 2003 MLB draft.

== Professional career ==
He made his major league debut for the Padres in 2007, appearing in one game. He appeared in nine more games for the team the following season.
