= Restorationism (disambiguation) =

Restorationism or Christian primitivism is the belief that a purer form of Christianity should be restored by believers using the early church as a model.

Restorationism may also refer to:

- the Stone–Campbell Restoration Movement, Christian primitivism from the 1840s onward in North America and Britain
- the British New Church Movement, British Christian primitivism of the 1960s onward
- Christian restorationism, a 19th-century movement promoting restoration of Jews to the Holy Land, which later became known as Christian Zionism
- Universal restoration, Greek apocatastasis, the "restoration of all things" mentioned in Acts, and most closely associated with Origen of Alexandria (184/185 – 253/254) and Gregory of Nyssa (c. 335 – c. 395)
- The formative Universalist Church of America's Restorationist faction of the 1820s, which insisted on a period of purgatory for some souls
- Restoration (Latter Day Saints), the process in the 1820s with which the Latter-day Saint movement started; also at times used as a synonym for the movement itself
- Restoration Branches, are Latter Day Saint independent organizations separate from the Community of Christ (at the time of separation in the 1980s known as the Reorganized Church of Jesus Christ of Latter Day Saints) over rejected changes made in 1984 church's conference
- Reactionism, a political ideological label for favoring a restoration of a previous state of society thought to possess positive characteristics absent from contemporary society

== See also ==
- Restoration (disambiguation)
- Revanchism
