= Love Does =

2012 Christian book by Bob Goff

- Book cover
- Author: Bob Goff and Donald Miller (foreword)
- Language: English
- Genre: Non-fiction, Memoir
- Publisher: Thomas Nelson
- Publication date: May 1, 2012
- Publication place: United States
- Media type: Print (paperback)
- Pages: 239
- ISBN: 1400203759

Love Does is a 2012 Christian non-fiction book by Bob Goff. It was published on May 1, 2012, by Thomas Nelson and collects several essays about life stories and experiences.

== Synopsis ==
The book contains several anecdotes that Goff ties into Christianity and how it relates to himself and others. In each passage, he relates several life lessons and how he believes that they can help the reader.

== Reception ==
Relevant magazine gave the book a positive review, writing that it "is an easy, challenging and inspiring read. If you've been looking for a breath of fresh air in your spirituality, this is it."
