= Restauration =

Restauration is French for restoration.

Restauration can refer to:

- Portuguese Restoration War (1640–1668)
- European Restoration, the return of many monarchies after Napoleon's French were defeated.
  - Bourbon Restoration, the restoration of the French monarchy under Louis XVIII.
  - Restauration (Switzerland), the period from 1814 to 1830 in Switzerland.
- Restauration (ship), one of the first ships bearing Norwegian immigrants to the United States.

== See also ==
- Restoration (disambiguation)
