= Love Does (organization) =

- Founded: 2003
- Founder: Bob Goff
- Type: 501(c)(3) under the laws of the State of California
- Location: San Diego, California, United States
- Region served: Afghanistan, Congo, India, Iraq, Nepal, Somalia, Uganda, United States
- Key people: Bob Goff (Founder) Jody Luke (Executive Director)
- Revenue: $1,800,000
- Website: lovedoes.org

Love Does, formerly known as Restore International, is a nonprofit organization founded by Bob Goff in 2003. Their goal is to work for freedom and human rights, improve educational opportunities, and try to be helpful to those in need of a voice and a friend.

== History ==
Restore International was founded in 2003 by Bob Goff after a trip to India where he witnessed extreme human rights violations. Restore India began with efforts to free those in bonded labor, human trafficking, or who were otherwise exploited. In 2006, they began working in Uganda in human rights and education. In March 2014 they launched a program in Somalia to improve educational opportunities, safety care for women and children, and feeding programs. In September 2014, Restore opened a school in Iraq as well as an orphanage in Nepal. In 2016, they rebranded to "Love Does" and continue to further their work in these countries.

== Activities ==
The work of Love Does is divided into two major areas: education and human rights. Their activities include education, fighting human trafficking through investigations, surveillance, brothel raids, working with local law enforcement, and providing safety for women and children. Love Does has been noted by Nicholas Kristof in his book A Path Appears in regards to their work in Uganda Restore International.

Love Does hosted two Love Does conferences in Austin, Texas and Tacoma, Washington. All of the proceeds went to efforts in Uganda and India.

=== Afghanistan ===
Love Does built a school in Afghanistan allowing for children to receive an adequate education. The school provides families and children with a stable and safe community where they can receive support and education.

=== Congo ===
Love Does built a school in the city of Goma to educate children living in conflict zones. They are partnered with the Price Fund and Justice Rising.

=== Uganda ===
Love Does has been working in Uganda since 2006, primarily to promote human rights and education. They also maintain a safe house in Kampala, Uganda, that has over 25 girls living there. Love Does holds weekly classes for more than 70 traditional healers to teach them basic literacy and anti human trafficking. Goff holds the position of Honorary Consul in Uganda.

==== Restore Leadership Academy ====
In 2007, Love Does founded Restore Leadership Academy, a secondary school, in Gulu, Uganda. Many of the students were previous child soldiers, rescued from lives of forced sex trafficking, orphans, or from backgrounds of extreme poverty. As of 2017, there are more than 500 students and 30 staff members in the primary, middle, and high schools. Restore Leadership Academy is one of the top schools in Northern Uganda for its academic performance and sports teams.

In addition to academics, they have focused on a holistic approach to student development by providing extracurricular actives and community building programs such sport teams, boy and girl scouts, group studies, and music programs.

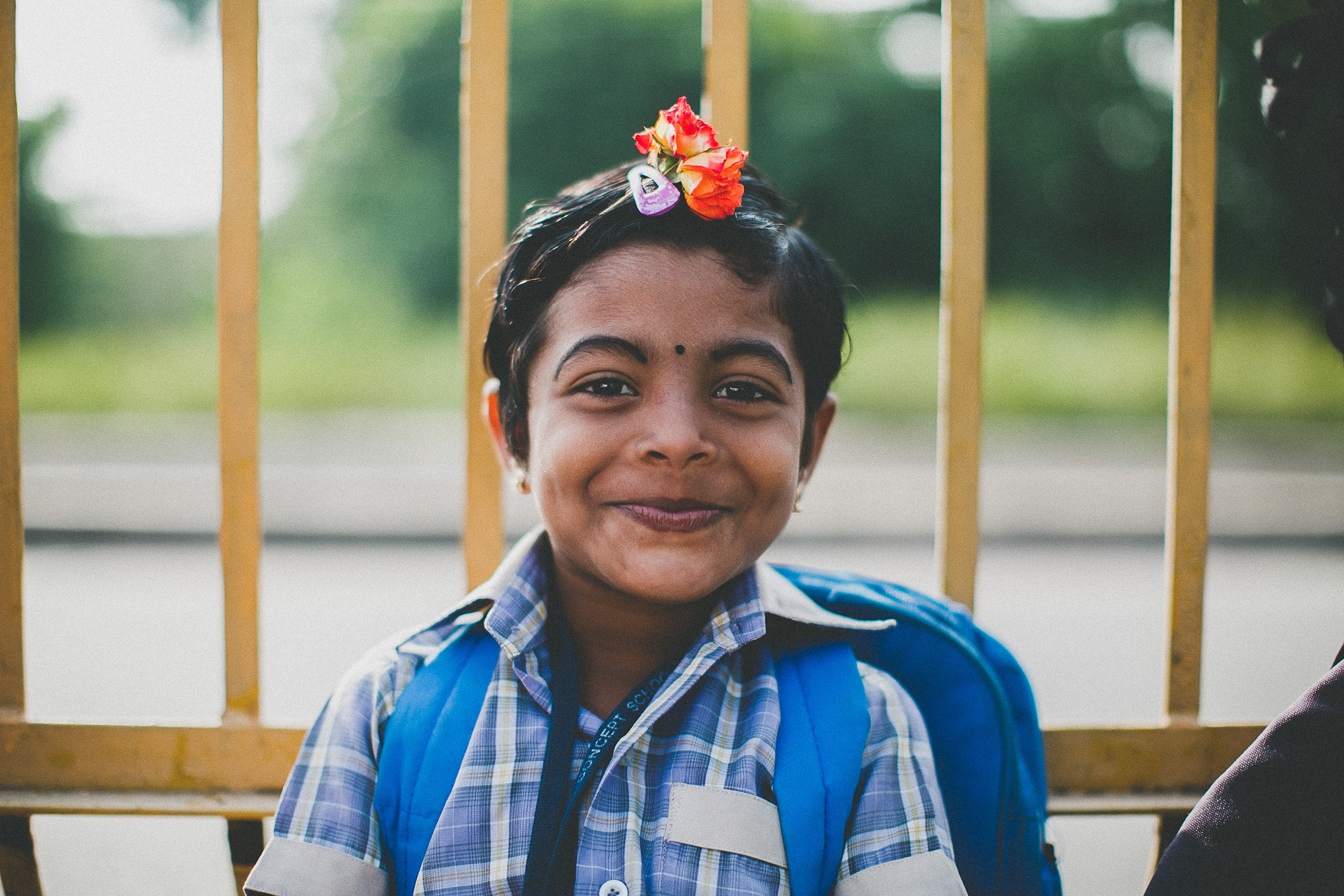
India Restore International

=== India ===
Love Does has been working in India since 2002 to investigate and perform surveillance to find children being enslaved in brothels or other forms of bonded labor. The children are then taken to homes to be cared for and, depending on the situation, returned to their families. It has helped stop forced prostitution in India by arresting over 80 criminals and placing the children in safe houses.

=== Somalia ===
Love Does works to improve educational opportunities for youth in Somalia and safety and care for women and children. The Mogadishu Safe House was opened in September 2014 for women and children who had been victims of gender based violence. The home provides safety, medical attention, counseling and therapy, and job training skills to help them rebuild their lives.

=== Iraq ===
Love Does has been working in Iraq since the summer of 2014, when ISIS took control of vast areas of Northern Iraq and displaced almost a million people. During this time they helped refugees by providing emergency supplies and aid and constructing a school for refugee children. The Love Does School is now home to almost 300 refugees. The student body is made up of Yazidi children from the Sinjar Mountain, Shabak children from Mosul, and Arab children from the Anbar province. All of their students are able to attend classes 5 days a week, and they bus all children living in IDP camps to the school. The Love Does Village is in construction and will consist of 20 homes for Syrian Refugee families.

=== Nepal ===
In September 2014, they opened the Love Does Nepal Orphanage. The girls cared for there attend a private school nearby the home. In 2015 Love Does went on relief trips to Nepal after the earthquake that struck in April and opened an after school program for children whose homes were destroyed by the earthquake. The Love Does School has more than 40 children attending. They come to the center after they get out of school and get a meal, tutoring, help with homework, and a safe place to spend time.

=== United States ===
==== San Diego ====
In 2019, Love Does began leading teams monthly into San Quentin State Prison to work with a special group of inmates. In 2020, they bought a food truck to serve low-income families and homeless children in the San Diego county. Love Does partners with Monarch School and UrbanLife, serving the families and children involved with those organizations.

=== Ukraine ===
In May 2022, Love Does worked with Legacy Collective to provide emergency relief to refugees of the Russian invasion. They secured 285,000 meals and helped supply and staff youth centers for refugees staying at the Warsaw Expo in Poland.
