= Sammuel Lamur =

American football player (born 1989)

Profile
- Position: Linebacker

Personal information
- Born: June 8, 1989 (age 37); West Palm Beach, Florida, U.S.
- Listed height: 6 ft 5 in (1.96 m)
- Listed weight: 235 lb (107 kg)

Career information
- High school: West Palm Beach (FL) The King's Academy
- College: Kansas State
- NFL draft: 2012: undrafted

Career history
- Tampa Bay Storm (2014–2015); Tampa Bay Buccaneers (2015)*
- * Offseason or practice squad member only
- Stats at ArenaFan.com

Sammuel Lamur (born June 8, 1989) is an American former professional football quarterback. He was signed by the Tampa Bay Storm as an undrafted free agent in 2014 as a quarterback. He played college football at Kansas State University. He is the twin brother of Minnesota Vikings linebacker, Emmanuel Lamur. He was signed by the Tampa Bay Buccaneers to play linebacker on August 6, 2015. He was waived on August 11, 2015.

== Personal life ==
Lamur is of Haitian descent. He is the twin brother of current free agent linebacker Emmanuel Lamur.
