= Bob Goff =

American lawyer and author (born 1959)

- Born: February 22, 1959 (age 67); California
- Education: San Diego State University (BS); University of San Diego School of Law (JD)
- Occupation: Lawyer
- Employer(s): Goff & DeWalt, Love Does
- Website: www.bobgoff.com

Robert Kendall Goff (born February 22, 1959) is an American lawyer, speaker, and author of the New York Times best-selling books Love Does and Everybody, Always. Goff currently works with Love Does, formerly known as Restore International, a non-profit organization he founded.

== Philanthropic work ==
Goff founded Restore International (now known as Love Does) in 2003 to "find daring, productive, and effective ways to fight the injustices committed against children". Love Does works to promote human rights and education in current and recovering conflict zones. Love Does currently works in Uganda, Iraq, Nepal, Somalia, Afghanistan, India, and the Dominican Republic.

== Career ==
Goff founded Goff and Dewalt, LLP (along with Daniel J DeWalt) in 1998 as a construction defect attorney. Located in Washington, the firm specializes in construction defect litigation, general counsel, and international rights (through Restore International).

Goff worked as an adjunct professor at Point Loma Nazarene University where he taught a class in business law. Goff similarly serves as an adjunct professor to Pepperdine University, in both the law school and the graduate degree programs, with courses such as Nonprofit Law in the Global Justice Program.

Goff is also a writer and an international motivational speaker. In 2016 he launched the Dream Big Framework, a curriculum and workshop designed to motivate people to accomplish their biggest dreams and ambitions. He has also invested in a Southern California retreat center, The Oaks, to be used as a hosting site for various workshops and events.

== Works ==
- Love Does. Nashville, TN: Thomas Nelson (2012)
- Everybody, Always. Nashville, TN: Nelson Books (2018)
- Live in Grace, Walk in Love. Nashville, TN: Nelson Books (2019)
- Dream Big. Nashville, TN: Nelson Books (2020)
- Undistracted. Nashville, TN: Nelson Books (2022)
