= Image restoration =

Image restoration may refer to:

- Conservation and restoration of photographs
- Digital photograph restoration
- Image restoration by artificial intelligence
- Iterative reconstruction

== See also ==
- Image restoration theory
