= 2003 Seattle Seahawks season =

American football team season

- Owner: Paul Allen
- General manager: Bob Ferguson
- Head coach: Mike Holmgren
- Home stadium: Seahawks Stadium

Results
- Record: 10–6
- Division place: 2nd NFC West
- Playoffs: Lost Wild Card Playoffs (at Packers) 27–33 (OT)
- All-Pros: OG Steve Hutchinson (1st team); ST Alex Bannister (1st team)
- Pro Bowlers: QB Matt Hasselbeck; RB Shaun Alexander; OT Walter Jones; OG Steve Hutchinson; ST Alex Bannister

The 2003 Seattle Seahawks season was the franchise's 28th season in the National Football League (NFL), the second season in Seahawks Stadium and the 5th under head coach Mike Holmgren. After going 31–33 in his first four years as head coach, the Seahawks went undefeated at home for the first time in franchise history and improved to 10–6, thus making the NFC playoffs as a wild card team, the first of fifteen playoff appearances over the next twenty seasons, and their first playoff berth since 1999. However, the team fell 33–27 to the Green Bay Packers in the opening round due to an interception returned for a touchdown by Green Bay's Al Harris in overtime. Following the season, Hall of Fame defensive tackle John Randle retired after 14 seasons.

== Offseason ==
Additions	Subtractions
LB Randall Godfrey (Titans)	P Jeff Feagles (Giants)
DE Chike Okeafor (49ers)	K Rian Lindell (Bills)
DT Norman Hand (Saints)	

=== 2003 NFL draft ===
2003 Seattle Seahawks draft
Round	Pick	Player	Position	College	Notes
1	11	Marcus Trufant *	CB	Washington State	
2	42	Ken Hamlin *	FS	Arkansas	
3	73	Wayne Hunter	OT	Hawaii	
4	110	Seneca Wallace	QB	Iowa State	
4	135	Solomon Bates	LB	Arizona State	
5	165	Chris Davis	FB	Syracuse	
6	183	Rashad Moore	DT	Tennessee	
7	222	Josh Brown *	K	Nebraska	
7	224	Taco Wallace	WR	Kansas State	
Made roster † Pro Football Hall of Fame * Made at least one Pro Bowl during career

=== Undrafted free agents ===
2003 undrafted free agents of note
Player	Position	College
Cedric Bonner	Wide receiver	Texas A&M–Commerce
Kerry Carter	Running Back	Stanford
Deitan Dubuc	Tight end	Michigan
Shane Hall	Guard	South Carolina

== Personnel ==
2003 Seattle Seahawks staff
Front Office: Chairman – Paul Allen; President – Bob Whitsitt; Executive Vice President of Football Operations/General Manager – Mike Holmgren; Senior Vice President – Mike Reinfeldt; Vice President of Football Operations – Ted Thompson; General Manager - Bob Ferguson; Director of Player Personnel – John Schneider; Director of Pro Personnel – Will Lewis; Director of College Scouting – Scot McCloughan; Scouting Assistant - Chris Culmer; Football Operations Coordinator / Team Travel - Bill Nayes; Head Coaches: Head Coach – Mike Holmgren; Assistant Head Coach/Offensive Line – Tom Lovat; Area Scout - Scott Fitterer; Offensive Coaches: Offensive Coordinator – Gil Haskell; Quarterbacks – Jim Zorn; Running Backs – Stump Mitchell; Wide Receivers – Nolan Cromwell; Tight Ends – Jim Lind; Assistant Offensive Line - Bill Laveroni; Quality Control / Offensive Assistant – Gary Reynolds	Defensive Coaches: Defensive Coordinator – Ray Rhodes; Defensive Line – Dwaine Board; Assistant Quality Control / Defensive Line - Zerick Rollins; Linebackers – John Marshall; Defensive Backs – Teryl Austin; Special Teams Coaches: Special Teams Coordinator – Pete Rodriguez; Assistant Special Teams – Mark Michaels; Strength and Conditioning: Strength and Conditioning – Kent Johnston; Assistant Strength and Conditioning – Rod Springer

== Final roster ==
2003 Seattle Seahawks roster
**Quarterbacks (QB)**: 4 Trent Dilfer; **8** Matt Hasselbeck; 15 Seneca Wallace; **Running backs (RB)**: **37** Shaun Alexander; 32 Kerry Carter; 44 Heath Evans; 20 Maurice Morris; **38** Mack Strong; **Wide receivers (WR)**: 85 Alex Bannister; 84 Bobby Engram; **82** Darrell Jackson; **81** Koren Robinson; 89 Jerheme Urban; 87 Taco Wallace; **Tight ends (TE)**: **88** Itula Mili; 86 Jerramy Stevens	**Offensive linemen (OL)**: **62** Chris Gray G; 74 Matt Hill T; 73 Wayne Hunter T; **76** Steve Hutchinson G; **71** Walter Jones T; 68 Dennis Norman C; **72** Chris Terry T; **61** Robbie Tobeck C; 77 Floyd Womack T; **Defensive linemen (DL)**: 99 Rocky Bernard DT; **78** Antonio Cochran DE; 92 Lamar King DE; 97 Brandon Mitchell DE; 95 Rashad Moore DT; **56** Chike Okeafor DE; 91 Anton Palepoi DE; **93** John Randle DT; **98** Cedric Woodard DT	**Linebackers (LB)**: 50 Solomon Bates OLB; **94** Chad Brown OLB; **53** Randall Godfrey MLB; 57 Orlando Huff MLB; 58 Isaiah Kacyvenski OLB; 54 D. D. Lewis OLB; **51** Anthony Simmons OLB; 59 Tracy White OLB; **Defensive backs (DB)**: **26** Ken Hamlin FS; 21 Ken Lucas CB; 42 Kris Richard CB; 22 Damien Robinson FS; **24** Shawn Springs CB; **25** Reggie Tongue SS; **23** Marcus Trufant CB; 27 Willie Williams CB; **Special teams (ST)**: 3 Josh Brown K; 52 J.P. Darche LS; 16 Tom Rouen P	**Practice squad**: 30 Walter Bernard CB; 19 Antoine Burns WR; 63 Dustin Kroeker T; 47 Casey Poppinga TE; **Reserve**: 34 Terreal Bierria S (IR); 35 Chris Davis FB (IR); 90 Chad Eaton DT (IR); 60 Shane Hall G (IR); 96 Norman Hand DT (IR); 83 Ryan Hannam TE (IR); 14 Jason Willis WR (IR); 70 Jerry Wunsch T (IR); Rookies in italics 53 active, 8 reserve, 4 practice squad

- Starters in bold.
- (*) Denotes players that were selected for the 2004 Pro Bowl.

== Schedule ==
=== Preseason ===
Week	Date	Opponent	Result	Record	Game site	Recap
1	August 9	San Diego Chargers	**W** 20–7	1–0	Seahawks Stadium	Recap
2	August 15	at Indianapolis Colts	**L** 7–21	1–1	RCA Dome	Recap
3	August 23	Kansas City Chiefs	**W** 42–31	2–1	Seahawks Stadium	Recap
4	August 29	at Denver Broncos	**L** 3–20	2–2	Mile High Stadium	Recap

Source: Seahawks Media Guides

=== Regular season ===
Week	Date	Opponent	Result	Record	Game site	Recap
1	September 7	New Orleans Saints	**W** 27–10	1–0	Seahawks Stadium	Recap
2	September 14	at **Arizona Cardinals**	**W** 38–0	2–0	Sun Devil Stadium	Recap
3	September 21	**St. Louis Rams**	**W** 24–23	3–0	Seahawks Stadium	Recap
4	Bye					
5	October 5	at Green Bay Packers	**L** 13–35	3–1	Lambeau Field	Recap
6	October 12	**San Francisco 49ers**	**W** 20–19	4–1	Seahawks Stadium	Recap
7	October 19	Chicago Bears	**W** 24–17	5–1	Seahawks Stadium	Recap
8	October 26	at Cincinnati Bengals	**L** 24–27	5–2	Paul Brown Stadium	Recap
9	November 2	Pittsburgh Steelers	**W** 23–16	6–2	Seahawks Stadium	Recap
10	November 9	at Washington Redskins	**L** 20–27	6–3	FedExField	Recap
11	November 16	Detroit Lions	**W** 35–14	7–3	Seahawks Stadium	Recap
12	November 23	at Baltimore Ravens	**L** 41–44 (OT)	7–4	M&T Bank Stadium	Recap
13	November 30	Cleveland Browns	**W** 34–7	8–4	Seahawks Stadium	Recap
14	December 7	at Minnesota Vikings	**L** 7–34	8–5	Metrodome	Recap
15	December 14	at **St. Louis Rams**	**L** 22–27	8–6	Edward Jones Dome	Recap
16	December 21	**Arizona Cardinals**	**W** 28–10	9–6	Seahawks Stadium	Recap
17	December 27	at **San Francisco 49ers**	**W** 24–17	10–6	3Com Park	Recap

Bold indicates division opponents.
Source: 2003 NFL season results

=== Postseason ===
Round	Date	Opponent (seed)	Result	Record	Game site	Recap
Wild Card	January 4, 2004	at Green Bay Packers (4)	**L** 27–33 (OT)	0–1	Lambeau Field	Recap

== Standings ==
NFC West
	W	L	T	PCT	DIV	CONF	PF	PA	STK
^{(2)} St. Louis Rams	12	4	0	.750	4–2	8–4	447	328	L1
^{(5)} Seattle Seahawks	10	6	0	.625	5–1	8–4	404	327	W2
San Francisco 49ers	7	9	0	.438	2–4	6–6	384	337	L1
Arizona Cardinals	4	12	0	.250	1–5	3–9	225	452	W1

== Game summaries ==
=== Preseason ===
==== Week P1: vs. San Diego Chargers ====
Preseason Week One: Seattle Seahawks vs. San Diego Chargers – Game summary

Quarter	1	2	3	4	Total
Chargers	0	0	0	7	7
Seahawks	7	7	0	6	20

at Seahawks Stadium, Seattle

- Date: August 9
- Game time: 7:05pm local
- Game weather: clear, 73 °F (23 °C), 64% humidity, wind variable 5 miles per hour (8.0 km/h)
- Game attendance: 37,763
- Referee: Ed Hochuli
- TV: FSNW
- Gamecenter, Gamebook

==== Week P2: at Indianapolis Colts ====
Preseason Week Two: Seattle Seahawks at Indianapolis Colts – Game summary

Quarter	1	2	3	4	Total
Seahawks	0	0	0	7	7
Colts	7	7	7	0	21

at RCA Dome, Indianapolis

- Date: August 15
- Game time: 7:00pm local
- Game weather: indoors
- Game attendance: 37,469
- Referee: Walt Coleman
- TV: FSNW
- Gamecenter, Gamebook

==== Week P3: vs. Kansas City Chiefs ====
Preseason Week Three: Seattle Seahawks vs. Kansas City Chiefs – Game summary

Quarter	1	2	3	4	Total
Chiefs	7	14	10	0	31
Seahawks	3	10	15	14	42

at Seahawks Stadium, Seattle

- Date: August 23
- Game time: 7:05pm local
- Game weather: overcast, 68 °F (20 °C), 39% humidity, wind SE 8 miles per hour (13 km/h)
- Game attendance: 39,833
- Referee: Ron Blum
- TV: FSNW
- Gamecenter, Gamebook

==== Week P4: at Denver Broncos ====
Preseason Week Four: Seattle Seahawks at Denver Broncos – Game summary

Quarter	1	2	3	4	Total
Seahawks	0	3	0	0	3
Broncos	3	0	14	3	20

at Invesco Field at Mile High, Denver

- Date: August 29
- Game time: 7:05pm local
- Game weather: cloudy, 70 °F (21 °C), 53% humidity, wind S 8 miles per hour (13 km/h)
- Game attendance: 73,038
- Referee: Bill Leavy
- TV: FSNW
- Gamecenter, Gamebook

=== Regular season ===
==== Week 1: vs. New Orleans Saints ====
Week One: Seattle Seahawks vs. New Orleans Saints – Game summary

Quarter	1	2	3	4	Total
Saints	3	0	0	7	10
Seahawks	0	21	3	3	27

at Seahawks Stadium, Seattle

- Date: September 7
- Game time: 1:18pm local
- Game weather: cloudy, 66 °F (19 °C), 68% humidity, wind N 6 miles per hour (9.7 km/h)
- Game attendance: 52,250
- Referee: Tony Corrente
- TV announcers (Fox): Ron Pitts, Tim Ryan & Darrell Greene
- Gamecenter, Gamebook

Game information

First quarter

- NO – John Carney 33-yard field goal, 5:20 (NO 3–0)

Second quarter

- SEA – Shaun Alexander 1-yard run (Josh Brown kick), 6:52 (SEA 7–3)
- SEA – Koren Robinson 35-yard pass from Matt Hasselbeck (Josh Brown kick), 5:43 (SEA 14–3)
- SEA – Shaun Alexander 10-yard pass from Matt Hasselbeck (Josh Brown kick), 0:17 (SEA 21–3)

Third quarter

- SEA – Josh Brown 37-yard field goal, 6:41 (SEA 24–3)

Fourth quarter

- NO – Joe Horn 2-yard pass from Aaron Brooks (John Carney kick), 8:47 (SEA 24–10)
- SEA – Josh Brown 25-yard field goal, 1:01 (SEA 27–10)

Top passers

- NO – Aaron Brooks: 29/47, 274 yds, 1 TD, 1 INT
- SEA – Matt Hasselbeck: 12/23, 137 yds, 2 TD

Top rushers

- NO – Deuce McAllister: 22 car, 99 yds, 0 TD
- SEA – Shaun Alexander: 24 car, 108 yds, 1 TD

Top receivers

- NO – Donté Stallworth: 8 rec, 101 yds
- SEA – Koren Robinson: 3 rec, 56 yds, 1 TD

Team – pass – rush – total – to

- NO – 263 – 96 – 359 – 4
- SEA – 119 – 151 – 270 – 0

Shaun Alexander bulled the Seahawks to a 27–10 win as he rushed for 108 yards and a touchdown while also catching a touchdown. The Saints fumbled away the ball three times and also committed eleven penalties.

==== Week 2: at Arizona Cardinals ====
Week Two: Seattle Seahawks at Arizona Cardinals – Game summary

Quarter	1	2	3	4	Total
Seahawks	7	17	7	7	38
Cardinals	0	0	0	0	0

at Sun Devil Stadium, Tempe, Arizona

- Date: September 14
- Game time: 1:06pm local
- Game weather: 98 °F (37 °C), 14% humidity, wind E 7 miles per hour (11 km/h)
- Game attendance: 23,127
- Referee: Ron Blum
- TV announcers (Fox): Curt Menefee, Tim Green & Kevin McCabe
- Gamecenter, Gamebook

Game information

First quarter

- SEA – Matt Hasselbeck 2-yard run (Josh Brown kick), 13:42 (SEA 7–0)

Second quarter

- SEA – Randall Godfrey 55-yard fumble return (Josh Brown kick), 14:11 (SEA 14–0)
- SEA – Josh Brown 37-yard field goal, 6:01 (SEA 17–0)
- SEA – Darrell Jackson 55-yard pass from Matt Hasselbeck (Josh Brown kick), 1:16 (SEA 24–0)

Third quarter

- SEA – Darrell Jackson 66-yard pass from Matt Hasselbeck (Josh Brown kick), 13:59 (SEA 31–0)

Fourth quarter

- SEA – Shaun Alexander 2-yard run (Josh Brown kick), 10:26 (SEA 38–0)

Top passers

- SEA – Matt Hasselbeck: 8/19, 175 yds, 2 TD
- ARI – Josh McCown: 18/32, 150 yds, 2 INT

Top rushers

- SEA – Maurice Morris: 11 car, 67 yds
- ARI – Emmitt Smith: 14 car, 54 yds

Top receivers

- SEA – Darrell Jackson: 3 rec, 133 yds, 2 TD
- ARI – Bryant Johnson: 7 rec, 68 yds

Team – pass – rush – total – to

- SEA – 193 – 130 – 323 – 0
- ARI – 193 – 93 – 286 – 6

After forcing four turnovers by the Saints, the Seahawks picked off Jeff Blake and Josh McCown four times while swallowing two fumbles en route to a 38–0 shutout win. Maurice Morris and Shaun Alexander split carries for 118 yards and a touchdown while Matt Hasselbeck ran in a touchdown and threw another.

==== Week 3: vs. St. Louis Rams ====
Week Three: Seattle Seahawks vs. St. Louis Rams – Game summary

Quarter	1	2	3	4	Total
Rams	7	10	6	0	23
Seahawks	7	3	0	14	24

at Seahawks Stadium, Seattle

- Date: September 21
- Game time: 1:06pm local
- Game weather: clear, 63 °F (17 °C), 60% humidity, wind variable 7 miles per hour (11 km/h)
- Game attendance: 65,841
- Referee: Ed Hochuli
- TV announcers (Fox): Sam Rosen, Bill Mass & Chris Myers
- Gamecenter, Gamebook

Game information

First quarter

- SEA – Orlando Huff recovered fumble in end zone (Josh Brown kick), 11:59 (SEA 7–0)
- STL – Marc Bulger 3-yard run (Jeff Wilkins kick), 3:29 (Tied 7–7)

Second quarter

- STL – Isaac Bruce 7-yard pass from Marc Bulger (Jeff Wilkins kick), 9:10 (STL 14–7)
- STL – Jeff Wilkins 28-yard field goal, 2:21 (STL 17–7)
- SEA – Josh Brown 19-yard field goal, 0:12 (STL 17–10)

Third quarter

- STL – Jeff Wilkins 33-yard field goal, 10:48 (STL 20–10)
- STL – Jeff Wilkins 33-yard field goal, 3:52 (STL 23–10)

Fourth quarter

- SEA – Darrell Jackson 15-yard pass from Matt Hasselbeck (Josh Brown kick), 14:10 (STL 23–17)
- SEA – Koren Robinson 3-yard pass from Matt Hasselbeck (Josh Brown kick), 1:00 (SEA 24–23)

Top passers

- STL – Marc Bulger: 21/34, 226 yds, 1 TD, 2 INT
- SEA – Matt Hasselbeck: 22/39, 256 yds, 2 TD, 1 INT

Top rushers

- STL – Lamar Gordon: 8 car, 41 yds
- SEA – Shaun Alexander: 14 car, 58 yds

Top receivers

- STL – Isaac Bruce: 5 rec, 69 yds, 1 TD
- SEA – Koren Robinson: 7 rec, 95 yds, 1 TD

Team – pass – rush – total – to

- STL – 226 – 82 – 308 – 3
- SEA – 220 – 96 – 316 – 1

The Rams and Seahawks began to build a bitter rivalry as the two clubs met with the Rams at 1–1 and the Seahawks 2–0. A Rams goalline fumble led to a Seahawks touchdown before the Rams reeled off 23 points by the fourth quarter. Then Matt Hasselbeck erupted to two fourth-quarter touchdowns and the 24–23 Seahawks win.

==== Week 5: at Green Bay Packers ====
Week Five: Seattle Seahawks at Green Bay Packers – Game summary

Quarter	1	2	3	4	Total
Seahawks	7	6	0	0	13
Packers	7	14	14	0	35

at Lambeau Field, Green Bay, Wisconsin

- Date: October 5
- Game time: 12:02pm local
- Game weather: clear, 48 °F (9 °C), 49% humidity, wind N 5 miles per hour (8.0 km/h)
- Game attendance: 70,365
- Referee: Larry Nemmers
- TV announcers (Fox): Dick Stockton, Daryl Johnston & Tony Siragusa
- Gamecenter, Gamebook

Game information

First quarter

- GB – Donald Driver 34-yard pass from Brett Favre (Ryan Longwell kick), 9:54 (GB 7–0)
- SEA – Shaun Alexander 1-yard run (Josh Brown kick), 5:31 (Tied 7–7)

Second quarter

- GB – Ahman Green 1-yard run (Ryan Longwell kick), 13:13 (GB 14–7)
- SEA – Josh Brown 27-yard field goal, 5:28 (GB 14–10)
- GB – Ahman Green 3-yard run (Ryan Longwell kick), 0:36 (GB 21–10)
- SEA – Josh Brown 58-yard field goal, 0:00 (GB 21–13)

Third quarter

- GB – Tony Fisher 11-yard run (Ryan Longwell kick), 11:09 (GB 28–13)
- GB – William Henderson 2-yard pass from Brett Favre (Ryan Longwell kick), 0:39 (GB 35–13)

Fourth quarter

- No scoring plays

Top passers

- SEA – Matt Hasselbeck: 23/39, 225 yds, 1 INT
- GB – Brett Favre: 19/25, 185 yds, 2 TD

Top rushers

- SEA – Shaun Alexander: 20 car, 102 yds, 1 TD
- GB – Ahman Green: 27 car, 118 yds, 2 TD

Top receivers

- SEA – Koren Robinson: 8 rec, 76 yds
- GB – Donald Driver: 7 rec, 72 yds, 1 TD

Team – pass – rush – total – to

- SEA – 215 – 128 – 343 – 2
- GB – 177 – 159 – 336 – 0

Mike Holmgren returned to Lambeau Field and saw his Seahawks routed 35–13 by his old team, the Packers. Brett Favre threw two touchdowns while Ahman Green and Tony Fisher combined for 141 rushing yards and three touchdowns. Matt Hasselbeck was intercepted once while Shaun Alexander managed 102 yards and a score.

==== Week 6: vs. San Francisco 49ers ====
Week Six: Seattle Seahawks vs. San Francisco 49ers – Game summary

Quarter	1	2	3	4	Total
49ers	0	3	13	3	19
Seahawks	7	10	0	3	20

at Seahawks Stadium, Seattle

- Date: October 12
- Game time: 5:37pm local
- Game weather: partly cloudy, 59 °F (15 °C), 72% humidity, wind N 16 miles per hour (26 km/h)
- Game attendance: 66,437
- Referee: Pete Morelli
- TV announcers (ESPN): Mike Patrick, Joe Theismann, Paul Maguire, Suzy Kolber
- Gamecenter, Gamebook

Game information

First quarter

- SEA – Itula Mili 15-yard pass from Matt Hasselbeck (Josh Brown kick), 7:35 (SEA 7–0)

Second quarter

- SEA – Josh Brown 27-yard field goal, 14:58 (SEA 10–0)
- SEA – Mack Strong 21-yard run (Josh Brown kick), 5:04 (SEA 17–0)
- SF – Owen Pochman 42-yard field goal, 0:03 (SEA 17–3)

Third quarter

- SF – Garrison Hearst 6-yard run (Owen Pochman kick), 10:38 (SEA 17–10)
- SF – Jeff Garcia 2-yard run (PAT failed), 0:56 (SEA 17–16)

Fourth quarter

- SF – Owen Pochman 33-yard field goal, 8:09 (SF 19–17)
- SEA – Josh Brown 37-yard field goal, 3:04 (SEA 20–19)

Top passers

- SF – Jeff Garcia: 16/27, 168 yds
- SEA – Matt Hasselbeck: 17/27, 207 yds, 1 TD, 1 INT

Top rushers

- SF – Garrison Hearst: 16 car, 62 yds, 1 TD
- SEA – Shaun Alexander: 22 car, 77 yds

Top receivers

- SF – Tai Streets: 5 rec, 77 yds
- SEA – Darrell Jackson: 5 rec, 55 yds

Team – pass – rush – total – to

- SF – 150 – 111 – 261 – 1
- SEA – 186 – 147 – 333 – 1

Former Seahawks coach Dennis Erickson came to Seattle and saw his 49ers fall behind 17–0 in the second quarter. The Niners clawed back but a failed point after kick left them trailing 17–16 in the third; it proved fatal as the Seahawks won 20–19 on a late 37-yard field goal.

==== Week 7: vs. Chicago Bears ====
Week Seven: Seattle Seahawks vs. Chicago Bears – Game summary

Quarter	1	2	3	4	Total
Bears	3	3	0	11	17
Seahawks	0	14	3	7	24

at Seahawks Stadium, Seattle

- Date: October 19
- Game time: 1:15pm local
- Game weather: clear, 63 °F (17 °C), 84% humidity, wind SW 8 miles per hour (13 km/h)
- Game attendance: 65,671
- Referee: Tony Corrente
- TV announcers (Fox): Ron Pitts & Tim Ryan
- Gamecenter, Gamebook

Game information

First quarter

- CHI – Paul Edinger 50-yard field goal, 3:08 (CHI 3–0)

Second quarter

- SEA – Shaun Alexander 1-yard run (Josh Brown kick), 12:41 (SEA 7–3)
- SEA – Bobby Engram 25-yard pass from Matt Hasselbeck (Josh Brown kick), 8:47 (SEA 14–3)
- CHI – Paul Edinger 35-yard field goal, 1:49 (SEA 14–6)

Third quarter

- SEA – Josh Brown 45-yard field goal, 5:37 (SEA 17–6)

Fourth quarter

- CHI – Paul Edinger 40-yard field goal, 13:28 (SEA 17–9)
- CHI – Stanley Pritchett 1-yard run (2-pt PAT: Chris Chandler run), 4:12 (Tied 17–17)
- SEA – Shaun Alexander 25-yard run (Josh Brown kick), 0:58 (SEA 24–17)

Top passers

- CHI – Chris Chandler: 19/34, 149 yds, 2 INT
- SEA – Matt Hasselbeck: 19/27, 215 yds, 1 TD, 1 INT

Top rushers

- CHI – Adrian Peterson: 16 car, 55 yds
- SEA – Shaun Alexander: 21 car, 101 yds, 2 TD

Top receivers

- CHI – Dez White: 6 rec, 35 yds
- SEA – Bobby Engram: 6 rec, 73 yds, 1 TD

Team – pass – rush – total – to

- CHI – 124 – 87 – 211 – 2
- SEA – 211 – 124 – 335 – 2

Despite two Chris Chandler interceptions and just 211 yards of offense, the Bears erased a 17–6 Seahawks lead and tied the game in the fourth quarter. The Seahawks then finished it off on Shaun Alexander's 25-yard score and a 24–17 win.

==== Week 8: at Cincinnati Bengals ====
Week Eight: Seattle Seahawks at Cincinnati Bengals – Game summary

Quarter	1	2	3	4	Total
Seahawks	7	10	7	0	24
Bengals	7	10	3	7	27

at Paul Brown Stadium, Cincinnati, Ohio

- Date: October 26
- Game time: 1:02pm local
- Game weather: cloudy, 49 °F (9 °C), 86% humidity, wind NE 5 miles per hour (8.0 km/h)
- Game attendance: 52,131
- Referee: Walt Anderson
- TV announcers (Fox): Chris Myers, Dale Hellestrae, Ari Wolfe
- Gamecenter, Gamebook

Game information

First quarter

- SEA – Itula Mili 46-yard pass from Matt Hasselbeck (Josh Brown kick), 10:39 (SEA 7–0)
- CIN – Rudi Johnson 18-yard run (Shayne Graham kick), 5:33 (Tied 7–7)

Second quarter

- CIN – Kelley Washington 8-yard pass from Jon Kitna (Shayne Graham kick), 10:39 (CIN 14–7)
- SEA – Shaun Alexander 2-yard pass from Matt Hasselbeck (Josh Brown kick), 6:34 (Tied 14–14)
- CIN – Shayne Graham 30-yard field goal, 0:59 (CIN 17–14)
- SEA – Josh Brown 27-yard field goal, 0:00 (Tied 17–17)

Third quarter

- SEA – Itula Mili 6-yard pass from Matt Hasselbeck (Josh Brown kick), 9:16 (SEA 24–17)
- CIN – Shayne Graham 25-yard field goal, 0:06 (SEA 24–20)

Fourth quarter

- CIN – Chad Johnson 53-yard pass from Jon Kitna (Shayne Graham kick), 8:03 (CIN 27–24)

Top passers

- SEA – Matt Hasselbeck: 26/43, 344 yds, 3 TD, 3 INT
- CIN – Jon Kitna: 18/30, 226 yds, 2 TD

Top rushers

- SEA – Shaun Alexander: 20 car, 86 yds
- CIN – Rudi Johnson: 27 car, 101 yds, 1 TD

Top receivers

- SEA – Darrell Jackson: 6 rec, 98 yds
- CIN – Chad Johnson: 3 rec, 84 yds, 1 TD

Team – pass – rush – total – to

- SEA –338 – 121 – 459 – 5
- CIN – 218 – 194 – 412 – 0

The Seahawks season began to take on a concerning problem of road performances. Their second straight road loss and sixth in their last two seasons came in a game where the lead tied or changed seven times; the Seahawks fumbled twice and Matt Hasselbeck was intercepted three times; Chad Johnson's 53-yard touchdown catch gave the Bengals the 27–24 win.

==== Week 9: vs. Pittsburgh Steelers ====
Week Nine: Seattle Seahawks vs. Pittsburgh Steelers – Game summary

Quarter	1	2	3	4	Total
Steelers	0	3	3	10	16
Seahawks	3	3	3	14	23

at Seahawks Stadium, Seattle

- Date: November 2
- Game time: 1:06pm local
- Game weather: clear, 44 °F (7 °C), 68% humidity, wind S 8 miles per hour (13 km/h)
- Game attendance: 66,507
- Referee: Bill Leavy
- TV announcers (CBS): Dick Enberg, Dan Dierdorf & Bonnie Bernstein
- Gamecenter, Gamebook

Game information

First quarter

- SEA – Josh Brown 36-yard field goal, 11:22 (SEA 3–0)

Second quarter

- PIT – Jeff Reed 49-yard field goal, 12:12 (Tied 3–3)
- SEA – Josh Brown 46-yard field goal, 7:05 (SEA 6–3)

Third quarter

- SEA – Josh Brown 34-yard field goal, 10:39 (SEA 9–3)
- PIT – Jeff Reed 33-yard field goal, 3:54 (SEA 9–6)

Fourth quarter

- SEA – Darrell Jackson 14-yard pass from Matt Hasselbeck (Josh Brown kick), 12:28 (SEA 16–6)
- PIT – Hines Ward 2-yard pass from Tommy Maddox (Jeff Reed kick), 9:32 (SEA 16–13)
- SEA – Shaun Alexander 1-yard run (Josh Brown kick), 7:21 (SEA 23–13)
- PIT – Jeff Reed 21-yard field goal, 3:24 (SEA 23–16)

Top passers

- PIT – Tommy Maddox: 21/35, 226 yds, 1 TD
- SEA – Matt Hasselbeck: 18/31, 215 yds, 1 TD

Top rushers

- PIT – Jerome Bettis: 17 car, 50 yds
- SEA – Shaun Alexander: 20 car, 48 yds, 1 TD

Top receivers

- PIT – Plaxico Burress: 5 rec, 75 yds
- SEA – Darrell Jackson: 5 rec, 85 yds, 1 TD

Team – pass – rush – total – to

- PIT – 215 – 105 – 320 – 0
- SEA – 191 – 98 – 289 – 0

The first three quarters were a battle of field goals, then in the fourth up 9–6 the Seahawks scored twice while Tommy Maddox had a touchdown. The 23–16 Seahawks win left them at 6–2 with the Steelers 2–6.

==== Week 10: at Washington Redskins ====
Week Ten: Seattle Seahawks at Washington Redskins – Game summary

Quarter	1	2	3	4	Total
Seahawks	14	3	0	3	20
Redskins	3	14	3	7	27

at FedExField, Landover, Maryland

- Date: November 9
- Game time: 1:02pm local
- Game weather: clear, 42 °F (6 °C), 44% humidity, wind NE 4 miles per hour (6.4 km/h)
- Game attendance: 80,728
- Referee: Walt Coleman
- TV announcers (Fox): Dick Stockton, Daryl Johnston & Tony Siragusa
- Gamecenter, Gamebook

Game information

First quarter

- WAS – John Hall 20-yard field goal, 12:26 (WAS 3–0)
- SEA – Bobby Engram 5-yard pass from Matt Hasselbeck (Josh Brown kick), 10:35 (SEA 7–3)
- SEA – Shaun Alexander 1-yard run (Josh Brown kick), 1:36 (SEA 14–3)

Second quarter

- WAS – Laveranues Coles 15-yard pass from Patrick Ramsey (John Hall kick), 5:54 (SEA 14–10)
- SEA – Josh Brown 27-yard field goal, 2:07 (SEA 17–10)
- WAS – Rod Gardner 14-yard pass from Patrick Ramsey (John Hall kick), 0:06 (SEA 17–17)

Third quarter

- WAS – John Hall 34-yard field goal, 8:35 (WAS 20–17)

Fourth quarter

- SEA – Josh Brown 48-yard field goal, 9:59 (Tied 20–20)
- WAS – Trung Canidate 10-yard pass from Rod Gardner (John Hall kick), 1:57 (WAS 27–20)

Top passers

- SEA – Matt Hasselbeck: 19/29, 241 yds, 1 TD, 1 INT
- WAS – Patrick Ramsey: 17/32, 232 yds, 2 TD, 2 INT

Top rushers

- SEA – Shaun Alexander: 22 car, 94 yds, 1 TD
- WAS – Rock Cartwright: 13 car, 81 yds

Top receivers

- SEA – Koren Robinson: 5 rec, 88 yds
- WAS – Laveranues Coles: 5 rec, 125 yds, 1 TD

Team – pass – rush – total – to

- SEA – 221 – 125 – 346 – 3
- WAS – 242 – 137 – 379 – 2

For the third straight road game the Seahawks fell short, blowing a 14–3 lead as Patrick Ramsey and Rod Gardner combined for three touchdowns. The Seahawks lost two fumbles while Matt Hasselbeck was intercepted once.

==== Week 11: vs. Detroit Lions ====
Week Eleven: Seattle Seahawks vs. Detroit Lions – Game summary

Quarter	1	2	3	4	Total
Lions	7	7	0	0	14
Seahawks	14	21	0	0	35

at Seahawks Stadium, Seattle

- Date: November 16
- Game time: 1:16pm local
- Game weather: cloudy, 46 °F (8 °C), 93% humidity, wind SE 9 miles per hour (14 km/h)
- Game attendance: 65,865
- Referee: Mike Carey
- TV announcers (Fox): Ron Pitts & Tim Ryan
- Gamecenter, Gamebook

Game information

First quarter

- SEA – Matt Hasselbeck 4-yard pass from Matt Hasselbeck (Josh Brown kick), 11:33 (SEA 7–0)
- SEA – Shaun Alexander 1-yard pass from Matt Hasselbeck (Josh Brown kick), 0:52 (SEA 14–0)
- DET – Scotty Anderson 72-yard pass from Joey Harrington (Jason Hanson kick), 0:38 (SEA 14–7)

Second quarter

- SEA – Koren Robinson recovered fumble in end zone (Josh Brown kick), 11:05 (SEA 21–7)
- SEA – Bobby Engram 34-yard pass from Matt Hasselbeck (Josh Brown kick), 6:38 (SEA 28–7)
- SEA – Bobby Engram 83-yard punt return (Josh Brown kick), 3:51 (SEA 35–7)
- DET – Az-Zahir Hakim 15-yard pass from Joey Harrington (Jason Hanson kick), 0:41 (SEA 35–14)

Third quarter

- No scoring plays

Fourth quarter

- No scoring plays

Top passers

- DET – Joey Harrington: 26/48, 285 yds, 2 TD, 2 INT
- SEA – Matt Hasselbeck: 21/28, 207 yds, 1 TD

Top rushers

- DET – Olandis Gary: 6 car, 43 yds
- SEA – Shaun Alexander: 20 car, 110 yds, 1 TD

Top receivers

- DET – Scotty Anderson: 2 rec, 87 yds, 1 TD
- SEA – Bobby Engram: 3 rec, 59 yds, 1 TD

Team – pass – rush – total – to

- DET – 276 – 81 – 357 – 2
- SEA – 207 – 159 – 366 – 0

Bobby Engram scored twice, on a 34-yard catch from Matt Hasselbeck and an 83-yard punt return. The Seahawks and Lions combined for 49 points in the first half before being shut out in the second as Seattle won 35–14.

==== Week 12: at Baltimore Ravens ====
Week Twelve: Seattle Seahawks at Baltimore Ravens – Game summary

Quarter	1	2	3	4	OT	Total
Seahawks	0	17	17	7	0	41
Ravens	0	3	21	17	3	44

at M&T Bank Stadium, Baltimore, Maryland

- Date: November 23
- Game time: 1:02pm local
- Game weather: partly cloudy, 55 °F (13 °C), 80% humidity, wind 6 miles per hour (9.7 km/h)
- Game attendance: 69,477
- Referee: Tom White
- TV announcers (Fox): Curt Menefee, Tim Green, Brent Harris
- Gamecenter, Gamebook

Game information

First quarter

- No scoring plays

Second quarter

- SEA – Josh Brown 45-yard field goal, 11:49 (SEA 3–0)
- BAL – Matt Stover 21-yard field goal, 3:32 (Tied 3–3)
- SEA – Darrell Jackson 2-yard pass from Matt Hasselbeck (Josh Brown kick), 0:23 (SEA 10–3)
- SEA – Bobby Engram 10-yard pass from Matt Hasselbeck (Josh Brown kick), 0:01 (SEA 17–3)

Third quarter

- BAL – Marcus Robinson 13-yard pass from Anthony Wright (Matt Stover kick), 12:07 (SEA 17–10)
- SEA – Koren Robinson 10-yard pass from Matt Hasselbeck (Josh Brown kick), 10:38 (SEA 24–10)
- SEA – Josh Brown 46-yard field goal, 7:59 (SEA 27–10)
- BAL – Marcus Robinson 50-yard pass from Anthony Wright (Matt Stover kick), 5:26 (SEA 27–17)
- SEA – Darrell Jackson 80-yard pass from Matt Hasselbeck (Josh Brown kick), 5:06 (SEA 34–17)
- BAL – Marcus Robinson 25-yard pass from Anthony Wright (Matt Stover kick), 3:18 (SEA 34–24)

Fourth quarter

- SEA – Bobby Engram 5-yard pass from Matt Hasselbeck (Josh Brown kick), 14:16 (SEA 41–24)
- BAL – Ed Reed 16-yard blocked punt return (Matt Stover kick), 6:41 (SEA 41–31)
- BAL – Marcus Robinson 9-yard pass from Anthony Wright (Matt Stover kick), 1:12 (SEA 41–38)
- BAL – Matt Stover 40-yard field goal, 0:00 (Tied 41–41)

Overtime

- BAL – Matt Stover 42-yard field goal, 6:32 (BAL 44–41)

Top passers

- SEA – Matt Hasselbeck: 23/41, 333 yds, 5 TD
- BAL – Anthony Wright: 20/37, 319 yds, 4 TD

Top rushers

- SEA – Shaun Alexander: 22 car, 72 yds
- BAL – Jamal Lewis: 26 car, 117 yds

Top receivers

- SEA – Darrell Jackson: 7 rec, 146 yds, 2 TD
- BAL – Marcus Robinson: 7 rec, 131 yds, 4 TD

Team – pass – rush – total – to

- SEA – 293 – 133 – 426 – 3
- BAL – 276 – 150 – 426 – 2

Former Seahawks beat writer Clare Farnsworth called this game "one of the monumental collapses in Seahawks history." After going 29 minutes with just a pair of field goals and resultant 3–3 tie, the Seahawks scored 14 points to end the first half, then built a 41–24 lead in the fourth quarter. Ed Reed scored on a blocked punt, then Anthony Wright erupted with huge throws to Frank Sanders and Marcus Robinson and the score was now 41–38 Seahawks. In the final 33 seconds an administrative mistake on a Seahawks run and a withdrawn ineligible player penalty by referee Tom White stopped the clock and saved the Ravens from using their final timeout; they stopped a Matt Hasselbeck sneak on fourth down, then a pass interference penalty set up Matt Stover's tying field goal. In overtime ex-Raven Trent Dilfer had to come in for one play but the Seahawks had to punt and the Ravens won on another Stover field goal. It was Seattle's fourth straight road loss.

==== Week 13: vs. Cleveland Browns ====
Week Thirteen: Seattle Seahawks vs. Cleveland Browns – Game summary

Quarter	1	2	3	4	Total
Browns	0	0	0	7	7
Seahawks	7	10	10	7	34

at Seahawks Stadium, Seattle

- Date: November 30
- Game time: 1:05pm local
- Game weather: clear, 42 °F (6 °C), 85% humidity, wind NE 9 miles per hour (14 km/h)
- Game attendance: 64,680
- Referee: Ed Hochuli
- TV announcers (CBS): Ian Eagle & Solomon Wilcots
- Gamecenter, Gamebook

Game information

First quarter

- SEA – Itula Mili 2-yard pass from Matt Hasselbeck (Josh Brown kick), 11:41 (SEA 7–0)

Second quarter

- SEA – Josh Brown 36-yard field goal, 9:05 (SEA 10–0)
- SEA – Darrell Jackson 3-yard pass from Matt Hasselbeck (Josh Brown kick), 4:41 (SEA 17–0)

Third quarter

- SEA – Darrell Jackson 26-yard pass from Matt Hasselbeck (Josh Brown kick), 8:49 (SEA 24–0)
- SEA – Josh Brown 41-yard field goal, 2:36 (SEA 27–0)

Fourth quarter

- SEA – Shaun Alexander 3-yard run (Josh Brown kick), 7:15 (SEA 34–0)
- CLE – Andre King 28-yard blocked punt return (Phil Dawson kick), 3:23 (SEA 34–7)

Top passers

- CLE – Kelly Holcomb: 22/31, 186 yds, 1 INT
- SEA – Matt Hasselbeck: 26/35, 328 yds, 3 TD, 1 INT

Top rushers

- CLE – James Jackson: 12 car, 32 yds
- SEA – Shaun Alexander: 27 car, 127 yds, 1 TD

Top receivers

- CLE – Dennis Northcutt: 5 rec, 61 yds
- SEA – Koren Robinson: 6 rec, 122 yds

Team – pass – rush – total – to

- CLE – 167 – 47 – 214 – 3
- SEA – 306 – 157 – 463 – 1

Still angry over the loss to the Ravens, the Seahawks finished the AFC North portion of their schedule by crushing the Browns 34–7; Andre King scored on a blocked Seahawks punt in the fourth quarter but by then Matt Hasselbeck had thrown three touchdowns and the Seahawks had forced three Browns turnovers.

==== Week 14: at Minnesota Vikings ====
Week Fourteen: Seattle Seahawks at Minnesota Vikings – Game summary

Quarter	1	2	3	4	Total
Seahawks	0	0	7	0	7
Vikings	0	13	7	14	34

at Metrodome, Minneapolis

- Date: December 7
- Game time: 12:00pm local
- Game weather: indoors
- Game attendance: 63,968
- Referee: Larry Nemmers
- TV announcers (Fox): Sam Rosen, Bill Maas & Chris Myers
- Gamecenter, Gamebook

Game information

First quarter

- No scoring plays

Second quarter

- MIN – Randy Moss 47-yard pass from Daunte Culpepper (Aaron Elling kick), 13:17 (MIN 7–0)
- MIN – Aaron Elling 36-yard field goal, 3:27 (MIN 10–0)
- MIN – Aaron Elling 35-yard field goal, 0:00 (MIN 13–0)

Third quarter

- SEA – Shaun Alexander 1-yard run (Josh Brown kick), 12:42 (MIN 13–7)
- MIN – Randy Moss 45-yard pass from Daunte Culpepper (Aaron Elling kick), 9:24 (MIN 20–7)

Fourth quarter

- MIN – Kelly Campbell 43-yard pass from Daunte Culpepper (Aaron Elling kick), 14:53 (MIN 27–7)
- MIN – Mike Nattiel 80-yard interception return (Aaron Elling kick), 1:34 (MIN 34–7)

Top passers

- SEA – Matt Hasselbeck: 17/34, 218 yds, 2 INT
- MIN – Daunte Culpepper: 21/33, 274 yds, 3 TD

Top rushers

- SEA – Shaun Alexander: 14 car, 56 yds, 1 TD
- MIN – Michael Bennett: 25 car, 103 yds

Top receivers

- SEA – Bobby Engram: 4 rec, 93 yds
- MIN – Randy Moss: 8 rec, 133 yds, 2 TD

Team – pass – rush – total – to

- SEA – 202 – 56 – 258 – 3
- MIN – 272 – 193 – 465 – 0

The Seahawks' road struggles continued as Randy Moss and Kelly Campbell caught touchdowns from Daunte Culpepper while Matt Hasselbeck was picked off by Mike Nattiel and Nattiel scored from 80 yards out. The Vikings won 34–7 by outgaining the Seahawks 463 total yards to 258, leaving both teams at 8–5.

==== Week 15: at St. Louis Rams ====
Week Fifteen: Seattle Seahawks at St. Louis Rams – Game summary

Quarter	1	2	3	4	Total
Seahawks	2	10	3	7	22
Rams	14	7	0	6	27

at Edward Jones Dome, St. Louis, Missouri

- Date: December 14
- Game time: 12:02pm local
- Game weather: indoors
- Game attendance: 66,152
- Referee: Walt Coleman
- TV announcers (Fox): Joe Buck, Troy Aikman, Cris Collinsworth & Pam Oliver
- Gamecenter, Gamebook

Game information

First quarter

- SEA – Safety, Orlando Huff tackled Marc Bulger in end zone, 11:37 (SEA 2–0)
- STL – Marshall Faulk 5-yard run (Jeff Wilkins kick), 3:05 (STL 7–2)
- STL – Isaac Bruce 18-yard pass from Marc Bulger (Jeff Wilkins kick), 1:10 (STL 14–2)

Second quarter

- SEA – Darrell Jackson 9-yard pass from Matt Hasselbeck (Josh Brown kick), 7:53 (STL 14–9)
- STL – Torry Holt 40-yard pass from Marc Bulger (Jeff Wilkins kick), 5:06 (STL 21–9)
- SEA – Josh Brown 31-yard field goal, 0:18 (STL 21–12)

Third quarter

- SEA – Josh Brown 38-yard field goal, 5:18 (STL 21–15)

Fourth quarter

- STL – Jeff Wilkins 33-yard field goal, 14:18 (STL 24–15)
- SEA – Shaun Alexander 2-yard run (Josh Brown kick), 10:18 (STL 24–22)
- STL – Jeff Wilkins 46-yard field goal, 1:37 (STL 27–22)

Top passers

- SEA – Matt Hasselbeck: 21/37, 246 yds, 1 TD, 1 INT
- STL – Marc Bulger: 20/32, 236 yds, 2 TD, 1 INT

Top rushers

- SEA – Shaun Alexander: 25 car, 126 yds, 1 TD
- STL – Marshall Faulk: 28 car, 85 yds, 1 TD

Top receivers

- SEA – Darrell Jackson: 6 rec, 99 yds, 1 TD
- STL – Torry Holt: 6 rec, 100 yds, 1 TD

Team – pass – rush – total – to

- SEA – 231 – 135 – 366 – 1
- STL – 230 – 86 – 316 – 1

The Seahawks fell out of contention for the NFC West as the Rams won 27–22 to go to 11–3 with the Seahawks clawing for a wildcard spot at 8–6 with their sixth straight road loss. The deciding play came in the final seconds when Hasselbeck launched a Hail Mary pass from the 50; a referee stumbled and Bobby Engram tripped over him short of the goalline as the pass was nearly intercepted.

==== Week 16: vs. Arizona Cardinals ====
Week Sixteen: Seattle Seahawks vs. Arizona Cardinals – Game summary

Quarter	1	2	3	4	Total
Cardinals	0	3	0	7	10
Seahawks	14	7	0	7	28

at Seahawks Stadium, Seattle

- Date: December 21
- Game time: 1:15pm local
- Game weather: overcast, 49 °F (9 °C), 97% humidity, wind SE 3 miles per hour (4.8 km/h)
- Game attendance: 64,899
- Referee: Bill Leavy
- TV announcers (Fox): Dan Miller & Bill Romanowski
- Gamecenter, Gamebook

Game information

First quarter

- SEA – Shaun Alexander 9-yard run (Josh Brown kick), 9:58 (SEA 7–0)
- SEA – Maurice Morris 4-yard pass from Matt Hasselbeck (Josh Brown kick), 0:59 (SEA 14–0)

Second quarter

- ARI – Neil Rackers 49-yard field goal, 12:42 (SEA 14–3)
- SEA – Shaun Alexander 44-yard run (Josh Brown kick), 11:06 (SEA 21–3)

Third quarter

- No scoring plays

Fourth quarter

- ARI – Anquan Boldin 60-yard pass from Josh McCown (Neil Rackers kick), 12:49 (SEA 21–10)
- SEA – Bobby Engram 3-yard pass from Trent Dilfer (Josh Brown kick), 3:12 (SEA 28–10)

Top passers

- ARI – Josh McCown: 25/40, 274 yds, 1 TD
- SEA – Matt Hasselbeck: 17/24, 179 yds, 1 TD, 1 INT

Top rushers

- ARI – Josh McCown: 8 car, 38 yds
- SEA – Shaun Alexander: 21 car, 135 yds, 2 TD

Top receivers

- ARI – Anquan Boldin: 10 rec, 122 yds, 1 TD
- SEA – Itula Mili: 6 rec, 70 yds

Team – pass – rush – total – to

- ARI – 220 – 79 – 299 – 1
- SEA – 180 – 160 – 340 – 4

The Seahawks climbed back into wildcard contention as they sacked Josh McCown eight times, Shaun Alexander rushed for 135 yards and two touchdowns, Matt Hasselbeck and Trent Dilfer combined for a touchdown and an interception apiece, and Seattle won 28–10. Seattle stood tied with the Vikings (45–20 winners over Kansas City) and Green Bay (who would blast the Oakland Raiders 41–7 on Monday Night Football the next night) all at 9–6 with the Cowboys holding the first wildcard at 10–5.

==== Week 17: at San Francisco 49ers ====
Week Seventeen: Seattle Seahawks at San Francisco 49ers – Game summary

Quarter	1	2	3	4	Total
Seahawks	0	14	7	3	24
49ers	0	14	3	0	17

at 3Com Park, San Francisco

- Date: December 27
- Game time: 2:15pm local
- Game weather: clear, 49 °F (9 °C), 80% humidity, wind NE 5 miles per hour (8.0 km/h)
- Game attendance: 67,840
- Referee: Mike Carey
- TV announcers (Fox): Dick Stockton, Daryl Johnston & Tony Siragusa
- Gamecenter, Gamebook

Game information

First quarter

- No scoring plays

Second quarter

- SF – Jed Weaver 18-yard pass from Jeff Garcia (Todd Peterson kick), 10:59 (SF 7–0)
- SF – Cedrick Wilson 14-yard pass from Jeff Garcia (Todd Peterson kick), 8:47 (SF 14–0)
- SEA – Alex Bannister 31-yard pass from Matt Hasselbeck (Josh Brown kick), 5:51 (SF 14–7)
- SEA – Shaun Alexander 3-yard run (Josh Brown kick), 0:54 (Tied 14–14)

Third quarter

- SF – Todd Peterson 38-yard field goal, 9:36 (SF 17–14)
- SEA – Koren Robinson 30-yard pass from Matt Hasselbeck (Josh Brown kick), 3:28 (SEA 21–17)

Fourth quarter

- SEA – Josh Brown 33-yard field goal, 1:56 (SEA 24–17)

Top passers

- SEA – Matt Hasselbeck: 24/37, 315 yds, 2 TD, 2 INT
- SF – Jeff Garcia: 22/38, 248 yds, 2 TD, 1 INT

Top rushers

- SEA – Shaun Alexander: 21 car, 84 yds, 1 TD
- SF – Kevan Barlow: 14 car, 40 yds

Top receivers

- SEA – Koren Robinson: 6 rec, 85 yds, 1 TD
- SF – Brandon Lloyd: 3 rec, 63 yds

Team – pass – rush – total – to

- SEA – 305 – 89 – 394 – 3
- SF – 231 – 59 – 290 – 1

Seattle finally won a second road game as they clawed from down 17–14 with a Matt Hasselbeck touchdown and a field goal; Jeff Garcia's 4th down incompletion sealed a 24–17 Seahawks win. The game was the second of a pre-New Year's Saturday triple header; the Seahawks thus had to wait until Sunday before a win by Green Bay, a loss by Dallas, and a last-second loss by Minnesota sorted out the NFC playoff picture, putting Seattle as the conference's fifth seed.

=== Postseason ===
Seattle entered the postseason as the #5 seed in the NFC.

==== NFC Wild Card Playoff: at #4 Green Bay Packers ====
NFC Wild Card Playoff: #5 Seattle Seahawks at #4 Green Bay Packers – Game summary

Quarter	1	2	3	4	OT	Total
Seahawks	3	3	14	7	0	27
Packers	0	13	0	14	6	33

at Lambeau Field, Green Bay, Wisconsin

- Date: January 4
- Game time: 1:04pm local
- Game weather: 20 °F (−7 °C), 74% humidity, wind 14 miles per hour (23 km/h)
- Game attendance: 71,457
- Referee: Bernie Kukar
- TV announcers (Fox): Joe Buck, Troy Aikman, Cris Collinsworth, Pam Oliver & Chris Myers
- Gamecenter, Gamebook

Game information

First quarter

- SEA – Josh Brown 30-yard field goal, 7:01 (SEA 3–0)

Second quarter

- GB – Ryan Longwell 31-yard field goal, 9:13 (Tied 3–3)
- SEA – Josh Brown 35-yard field goal, 6:50 (SEA 6–3)
- GB – Bubba Franks 23-yard pass from Brett Favre (Ryan Longwell kick), 4:37 (GB 10–6)
- GB – Ryan Longwell 27-yard field goal, 0:46 (GB 13–6)

Third quarter

- SEA – Shaun Alexander 1-yard run (Josh Brown kick), 9:28 (Tied 13–13)
- SEA – Shaun Alexander 1-yard run (Josh Brown kick), 1:57 (SEA 20–13)

Fourth quarter

- GB – Ahman Green 1-yard run (Ryan Longwell kick), 10:01 (Tied 20–20)
- GB – Ahman Green 1-yard run (Ryan Longwell kick), 2:44 (GB 27–20)
- SEA – Shaun Alexander 1-yard run (Josh Brown kick), 0:51 (Tied 27–27)

Overtime

- GB – Al Harris 52-yard interception return, 10:35 (GB 33–27)

Top passers

- SEA – Matt Hasselbeck: 25/45, 305 yds, 1 INT
- GB – Brett Favre: 26/38, 319 yds, 1 TD

Top rushers

- SEA – Shaun Alexander: 20 car, 45 yds, 3 TD
- GB – Ahman Green: 23 car, 66 yds, 2 TD

Top receivers

- SEA – Koren Robinson: 7 rec, 88 yds
- GB – Javon Walker: 5 rec, 111 yds

Team – pass – rush – total – to

- SEA – 291 – 49 – 340 – 1
- GB – 319 – 78 – 397 – 0

With Nate Poole of the Cardinals in attendance (a result of knocking the Vikings out of the playoffs the week before) in a mild snowstorm, the Packers hosted the upstart Seahawks. Green Bay clawed to a 13–6 halftime lead, but in the third quarter Shawn Alexander touchdowns put the Seahawks up 20–13. Two Ahman Green touchdown rushes in the fourth quarter put the Packers back up 27–20. After the Seahawks tied the game, Brett Favre completed three straight passes for 41 yards in Green Bay's final drive, but Ryan Longwell misfired on the ensuing 47-yard field goal attempt. The Seahawks won the overtime coin toss; Matt Hasselbeck brashly stated to referee Bernie Kukar "We want the ball and we're gonna score!" The boast was picked up on stadium and FOX Sports television microphones and became a source of infamy; after completing two passes for twelve yards Hasselbeck targeted Alex Bannister but the ball was intercepted by Packers cornerback Al Harris at the Packers' 48-yard-line and he ran it back for a touchdown, ending the game with a 33–27 Packers victory and ending Seattle's season.
