= Bob Ferguson =

Bob Ferguson may refer to:

== Athletes ==
- Bob Ferguson (American football executive) (born 1951), general manager of the Arizona Cardinals and Seattle Seahawks
- Bob Ferguson (footballer) (1917–2006), English professional footballer
- Bob Ferguson (fullback) (1939–2004), American football fullback
- Bob Ferguson (golfer) (1846–1915), golfer
- Bob Ferguson (ice hockey) (born 1954), Canadian former ice hockey player and coach
- Bob Ferguson (infielder) (1845–1894), baseball infielder, manager, executive, and umpire
- Bob Ferguson (pitcher) (1919–2008), baseball pitcher

== Other ==
- Bob Ferguson (journalist) (1931–2014), Canadian sports journalist and writer
- Bob Ferguson (musician) (1927–2001), songwriter, manager, executive, writer, historian, and media specialist
- Bob Ferguson (politician) (born 1965), Washington state politician, 24th Governor of Washington
- Bob Ferguson, Canadian pole vaulter and medallist in athletics at the 1986 Commonwealth Games
- Bob Ferguson, main character of the film One Battle After Another (2025)

== See also ==
- Robert Ferguson (disambiguation)
- Bobby Ferguson (disambiguation)
- Ferguson (name)
