= Robert Ferguson =

Robert Ferguson may refer to:

== Law and politics ==
- Robert Ferguson of Raith (1769–1840), Scottish MP for Fife and Kirkcaldy Burghs
- Sir Robert Ferguson, 2nd Baronet (1795–1860), Irish MP for Londonderry
- Robert Munro Ferguson (1802–1868), Scottish army officer and MP for Kirkcaldy Burghs
- Robert Ferguson (Carlisle MP) (1817–1898), English member of parliament for Carlisle
- Robert Ferguson (Ontario politician) (1834–1901), Canadian merchant and political figure
- Robert Ferguson (Manitoba politician) (1866–1958), Canadian politician
- Robert Ross Ferguson (1917–2006), Canadian reeve (mayor) of Fort Qu'Appelle, Saskatchewan
- Robert E. Ferguson (1924–2016), American politician
- Bob Ferguson (born 1965), American lawyer and attorney general of Washington State

== Science and medicine ==
- Robert Ferguson (physician) (1799–1865), Scottish physician
- Robert McNair Ferguson (1829–1912), Scottish mathematician
- Robert Ferguson (physicist) (1932–2022), American nuclear physicist

== Sports ==
- Robert Ferguson (footballer, born 1884) (1884–1962), Scottish footballer who played for Liverpool
- Robert Ferguson (English footballer) (fl. 1906–1907), Bradford City player
- Robert Ferguson (footballer, born 1902) (1902–?), Scottish footballer who played for Sunderland and Middlesbrough
- Robert Ferguson (footballer, born 1908) (1908–?), English professional footballer
- Robert Ferguson (American football) (born 1979), American football wide receiver
- Bob Ferguson (golfer) (1846-1915), Scottish golfer who won the Open Championship in 1880, 1881 and 1882

== Other ==
- Robert Ferguson (minister) (c. 1637–1714), Scottish religious minister, conspirator and political pamphleteer
- Robert Ferguson (author) (born 1948), English-born Norwegian author, dramatist and translator

== Other uses ==
- A fictional character in The Adventure of the Sussex Vampire, a 1924 Sherlock Holmes story by Sir Arthur Conan Doyle
- Robert Ferguson House, near Newark, New Castle County, Delaware, built 1790–1810
- Robert W. Ferguson House, a historic home in Emathla, Florida

== See also ==
- Robert Fergusson (disambiguation)
- Bob Ferguson (disambiguation)
- Bobby Ferguson (disambiguation)
