= Orlando Huff =

American football player (born 1978)

No. 57
- Position: Linebacker

Personal information
- Born: August 14, 1978 (age 48); Mobile, Alabama, U.S.
- Listed height: 6 ft 3 in (1.91 m)
- Listed weight: 236 lb (107 kg)

Career information
- High school: Upland (CA)
- College: Fresno State
- NFL draft: 2001: 4th round, 104th overall pick

Career history
- Seattle Seahawks (2001–2004); Arizona Cardinals (2005–2006); Atlanta Falcons (2007)*; California Redwoods (2009)*
- * Offseason or practice squad member only

Career NFL statistics
- Total tackles: 282
- Sacks: 3
- Forced fumbles: 3
- Fumble recoveries: 3
- Interceptions: 2
- Defensive touchdowns: 1
- Stats at Pro Football Reference

Orlando Huff (born August 14, 1978) is an American former professional football player who was a linebacker in the National Football League (NFL). He was selected by the Seattle Seahawks in the fourth round of the 2001 NFL draft. He played college football for the Fresno State Bulldogs.

Huff was also a member of the Arizona Cardinals, Atlanta Falcons, and New York Sentinels.

== Early life ==
Huff attended Upland High School, where he was on the football, basketball, and track and field teams.

== College career ==
Huff played college football at Eastern Arizona College and Fresno State University.

== Professional career ==
=== Seattle Seahawks ===
Huff was selected in the fourth round (104th overall) of the 2001 NFL draft.

=== Arizona Cardinals ===
In the 2005 season, Huff started in 15 games, making 69 tackles, one quarterback sack, and one interception for two yards.

== NFL career statistics ==
Legend
	Led the league
**Bold**	Career high

=== Regular season ===
Year	Team	Games		Tackles					Interceptions					Fumbles			
Year	Team	GP	GS	Cmb	Solo	Ast	Sck	TFL	Int	Yds	TD	Lng	PD	FF	FR	Yds	TD
2001	SEA	12	0	7	7	0	0.0	0	0	0	0	0	0	**1**	0	0	0
2002	SEA	**16**	7	59	45	14	0.0	1	**1**	0	0	0	**5**	0	0	0	0
2003	SEA	11	2	24	20	4	**1.0**	2	0	0	0	0	0	0	1	0	**1**
2004	SEA	**16**	**14**	52	42	10	**1.0**	3	0	0	0	0	3	0	**2**	0	0
2005	ARI	**16**	12	**70**	50	**20**	**1.0**	**11**	**1**	**3**	0	**3**	3	**1**	0	0	0
2006	ARI	**16**	13	**70**	**58**	12	0.0	2	0	0	0	0	4	**1**	0	0	0
		87	48	282	222	60	3.0	19	2	3	0	3	15	3	3	0	1

=== Playoffs ===
Year	Team	Games		Tackles					Interceptions					Fumbles			
Year	Team	GP	GS	Cmb	Solo	Ast	Sck	TFL	Int	Yds	TD	Lng	PD	FF	FR	Yds	TD
2003	SEA	**1**	0	0	0	0	0.0	0	0	0	0	0	0	0	0	0	0
2004	SEA	**1**	0	**3**	**3**	0	0.0	0	0	0	0	0	0	0	0	0	0
		2	0	3	3	0	0.0	0	0	0	0	0	0	0	0	0	0
