= 2003 Washington Redskins season =

NFL team season

- Owner: Daniel Snyder
- General manager: Vinny Cerrato
- Head coach: Steve Spurrier
- Home stadium: FedExField

Results
- Record: 5–11
- Division place: 3rd NFC East
- Playoffs: Did not qualify
- All-Pros: CB Champ Bailey (1st & 2nd team); LB LaVar Arrington (2nd team)
- Pro Bowlers: WR Laveranues Coles; LB LaVar Arrington; CB Champ Bailey

The 2003 season was the Washington Redskins' 72nd season in the National Football League (NFL). The team failed to improve on their 7–9 record from 2002, dropping to 5–11 and missing the playoffs for the fourth straight year. This was their worst season since 1994.

This was the first season since 1982 that the Redskins did not have cornerback Darrell Green, who retired after the 2002 season. Owing to different formulas for intraconference scheduling used by the NFL before 2002, it was the first time since 1994 that the Redskins played the Atlanta Falcons and the first time ever the Redskins had played at the Georgia Dome, which opened in 1992. During the season the Redskins wore a patch on their jerseys with the initials "GSS: Hail to the Redskins" to commemorate Gerald S. Snyder, the father of owner Daniel Snyder who had died during the 2003 offseason.

Following the season, defensive end Bruce Smith retired after 19 seasons in the NFL, Pro Bowl defensive back Champ Bailey would be traded to the Denver Broncos and head coach Steve Spurrier left after spending only two seasons coaching the Redskins.

== Offseason ==
The Redskins acquired former New York Jets players Randy Thomas, John Hall, Laveranues Coles, and Chad Morton in free agency.

=== NFL draft ===
2003 Washington Redskins draft
Round	Pick	Player	Position	College	Notes
2	44	Taylor Jacobs	WR	Florida	
3	81	Derrick Dockery	G	Texas	
7	232	Gibran Hamdan	QB	Indiana	
Made roster † Pro Football Hall of Fame * Made at least one Pro Bowl during career

=== Undrafted free agents ===
2003 undrafted free agents of note
Player	Position	College
Chris Clemons	Defensive end	Georgia
Ade Jimoh	Cornerback	Utah State
Sultan McCullough	Running back	USC
Clifton Smith	Linebacker	Syracuse
Kevin Ware	Tight end	Washington

== Roster ==
2003 Washington Redskins roster
Quarterbacks (QB): 12 Gibran Hamdan; 8 Tim Hasselbeck; Running backs (RB): 46 Ladell Betts; 30 Trung Canidate; 40 Rock Cartwright; 47 Bryan Johnson FB; 22 Sultan McCullough; 20 Chad Morton; 45 John Simon; Wide receivers (WR): 80 Laveranues Coles; 87 Rod Gardner; 86 Taylor Jacobs; 84 Patrick Johnson; 85 Darnerien McCants; 83 Cliff Russell; Tight ends (TE): 82 Byron Chamberlain; 89 Zeron Flemister; 48 Kevin Ware	Offensive linemen (OL): 66 Derrick Dockery G; 79 Pita Elisara G/T; 64 Lennie Friedman C; 76 Jon Jansen T; 60 Chris Samuels T; 67 Daryl Terrell G/T; 77 Randy Thomas G; 68 Brandon Winey T; Defensive linemen (DL): 92 Martin Chase DT; 95 Lional Dalton DT; 90 Bernard Holsey DT; 96 Darrell Russell DT; 78 Bruce Smith DE; 91 Regan Upshaw DE; 94 Ron Warner DE; 97 Renaldo Wynn DE; 93 Peppi Zellner DE	Linebackers (LB): 98 Jessie Armstead OLB; 56 LaVar Arrington OLB; 52 Lemar Marshall OLB; 55 Kevin Mitchell MLB; 58 Antonio Pierce OLB; 51 Clifton Smith OLB; 54 Jeremiah Trotter MLB; Defensive backs (DB): 24 Champ Bailey CB; 25 Rashad Bauman CB; 41 Matt Bowen FS; 29 Todd Franz SS; 23 Ade Jimoh CB; 34 Andre Lott CB/S; 21 Fred Smoot CB; 31 David Terrell FS; Special teams (ST): 71 Ethan Albright LS; 4 Bryan Barker P; 10 John Hall K	Practice squad: 72 Nic Clemons DT; 19 Scott Cloman WR; -- Brandon Doman QB; 61 Ben Nowland C; -- Greg White DE; Reserve: 59 Chris Clemons LB (IR); 74 Dave Fiore G (IR); 99 Jermaine Haley DT (IR); 73 Kenyatta Jones T (IR); 50 Larry Moore C (IR); 75 Brandon Noble DT (IR); 26 Ifeanyi Ohalete S (IR); 11 Patrick Ramsey QB (IR); 88 Robert Royal TE (IR); Rookies in italics 53 active, 9 reserve, 5 practice squad

== Regular season ==
=== Schedule ===
Week	Date	Opponent	Result	Record	Venue	Attendance
1	September 4	New York Jets	**W** 16–13	1–0	FedExField	85,420
2	September 14	at Atlanta Falcons	**W** 33–31	2–0	Georgia Dome	70,241
3	September 21	**New York Giants**	**L** 21–24 (OT)	2–1	FedExField	84,856
4	September 28	New England Patriots	**W** 20–17	3–1	FedExField	83,632
5	October 5	at **Philadelphia Eagles**	**L** 25–27	3–2	Lincoln Financial Field	67,792
6	October 12	Tampa Bay Buccaneers	**L** 13–35	3–3	FedExField	85,490
7	October 19	at Buffalo Bills	**L** 7–24	3–4	Ralph Wilson Stadium	73,149
8	Bye					
9	November 2	at **Dallas Cowboys**	**L** 14–21	3–5	Texas Stadium	64,002
10	November 9	Seattle Seahawks	**W** 27–20	4–5	FedExField	80,728
11	November 16	at Carolina Panthers	**L** 17–20	4–6	Ericsson Stadium	73,263
12	November 23	at Miami Dolphins	**L** 23–24	4–7	Pro Player Stadium	73,578
13	November 30	New Orleans Saints	**L** 20–24	4–8	FedExField	76,821
14	December 7	at **New York Giants**	**W** 20–7	5–8	Giants Stadium	78,217
15	December 14	**Dallas Cowboys**	**L** 0–27	5–9	FedExField	70,284
16	December 21	at Chicago Bears	**L** 24–27	5–10	Soldier Field	61,719
17	December 27	**Philadelphia Eagles**	**L** 7–31	5–11	FedExField	76,766
Note: Intra-division opponents are in **bold** text.

=== Standings ===
NFC East
	W	L	T	PCT	DIV	CONF	PF	PA	STK
^{(1)} Philadelphia Eagles	12	4	0	.750	5–1	9–3	374	287	W1
^{(6)} Dallas Cowboys	10	6	0	.625	5–1	8–4	289	260	L1
Washington Redskins	5	11	0	.313	1–5	3–9	287	372	L3
New York Giants	4	12	0	.250	1–5	3–9	243	387	L8
