= Koren Robinson =

American football player (born 1980)

No. 81, 18, 19
- Position: Wide receiver

Personal information
- Born: March 19, 1980 (age 46); Belmont, North Carolina, U.S.
- Listed height: 6 ft 1 in (1.85 m)
- Listed weight: 205 lb (93 kg)

Career information
- High school: South Point (Belmont)
- College: NC State (1998–2000)
- NFL draft: 2001: 1st round, 9th overall pick

Career history
- Seattle Seahawks (2001–2004); Minnesota Vikings (2005); Green Bay Packers (2006–2007); Seattle Seahawks (2008); Florida Tuskers (2009)*; New York Sentinels (2009)
- * Offseason or practice squad member only

Awards and highlights
- First-team All-Pro (2005); Pro Bowl (2005); Third-team All-American (2000); First-team All-ACC (2000); ACC Rookie of the Year (1999)

Career NFL statistics
- Receptions: 294
- Receiving yards: 4,244
- Rushing yards: 115
- Return yards: 2,070
- Total touchdowns: 19
- Stats at Pro Football Reference

Koren Lynard Robinson (born March 19, 1980) is an American former professional football player who was a wide receiver for eight seasons in the National Football League (NFL). He played college football for the NC State Wolfpack. He was selected by the Seattle Seahawks ninth overall in the 2001 NFL draft, and also played for the NFL's Minnesota Vikings and Green Bay Packers between stints with the Seahawks. He was selected to the Pro Bowl with the Vikings in 2005.

== Professional career ==
Pre-draft measurables
Height	Weight	Arm length	Hand span	40-yard dash	10-yard split	20-yard split	Vertical jump	Broad jump
6 ft 1 1/2 in (1.87 m)	211 lb (96 kg)	31 1/2 in (0.80 m)	9 in (0.23 m)	4.61 s	1.60 s	2.69 s	38.5 in (0.98 m)	10 ft 3 in (3.12 m)
All values from NFL Combine

=== Seattle Seahawks (first stint) ===
The Seattle Seahawks selected Robinson with the 9th overall pick in the 2001 NFL draft, which was acquired along with a first round pick that was used to select Shaun Alexander in a trade that sent Joey Galloway to the Dallas Cowboys.

=== Minnesota Vikings ===
Robinson was signed by the Minnesota Vikings. He was given a limited role in his time with the Vikings and was named the team's kick returner. Despite it being the first time in his career he had returned kicks, Robinson made the Pro Bowl in 2005.

Robinson's time with the Vikings was marred by an incident that took place in, and between, St. Peter and Mankato, Minnesota. In August 2006, Robinson was charged with "A felony charge of fleeing a police officer in a motor vehicle, and misdemeanor charges of driving while intoxicated, reckless driving, careless driving and driving after suspension..." Police reported speeds in excess of 120 MPH during the pursuit and reported Robinson's blood-alcohol concentration (BAC) as 0.11 after his arrest. The legal BAC in Minnesota at the time was 0.08. Robinson was released by the Vikings 10 days later.

=== Green Bay Packers ===
In September 2006, Robinson was signed by the Green Bay Packers, much by the urging of then-quarterback Brett Favre and GM Ted Thompson (former Seahawks executive who had drafted Robinson in 2001 in Seattle). Robinson was suspended without pay on October 16, 2006, for a minimum of one year for violating the NFL's substance abuse policy. Robinson worked out with Favre's trainer to stay in football shape. Robinson was reinstated by Commissioner Goodell in October 2007, and he completed the 2007 season with 21 catches for 241 yards and one touchdown. His touchdown came against the Detroit Lions on December 30, 2007.

However, the Packers picked two younger receivers in the 2008 NFL draft, creating a logjam at the position. Robinson was deemed expendable, and the Packers released him on May 9, 2008. Packers General Manager Ted Thompson said, "I think a lot of Koren. I'm very proud to be able to see him turn things around. He's a true professional. He helped us in the locker room. He helped the young guys learn to be pros."

=== Seattle Seahawks (second stint) ===
On September 16, 2008, the Seahawks signed Robinson, due to the large number of injuries at the receiver position. In his second stint with the Seahawks, Robinson broke the franchise record with the longest catch in team history. Backup quarterback Seneca Wallace threw a pass to Robinson that went for 90 yards and a touchdown on the Seahawks' first play from scrimmage against the Philadelphia Eagles at Qwest Field in Seattle on November 2, 2008, which was also the longest pass in team history. On January 26, 2009, it was reported by Pro Football Weekly that Robinson was not expected to be back with the Seahawks the next season due to a chronic knee injury.

=== Florida Tuskers ===
Robinson was signed by the Florida Tuskers of the United Football League on September 3, 2009.

=== New York Sentinels ===
Robinson was traded to the Sentinels for future considerations.

== NFL career statistics ==
Year	Team	Games		Receiving					Returning				
Year	Team	GP	GS	Rec	Yds	Avg	Lng	TD	Ret	Yds	Avg	Lng	TD
2001	SEA	16	13	39	536	13.7	42	1	—	—	—	—	—
2002	SEA	16	16	78	1,240	15.9	83	5	—	—	—	—	—
2003	SEA	15	15	65	896	13.8	38	4	—	—	—	—	—
2004	SEA	10	8	31	495	16	33	2	—	—	—	—	—
2005	MIN	14	5	22	347	15.8	80	1	47	1,221	26.0	86	1
2006	GB	4	0	7	89	12.7	24	0	12	253	21.1	31	0
2007	GB	9	1	21	241	11.5	43	1	25	596	23.8	67	0
2008	SEA	12	12	31	400	12.9	90	2	—	—	—	—	—
Career		96	70	294	4,244	14.4	90	16	84	2,070	24.6	86	1
