= Seneca Wallace =

American football player (born 1980)

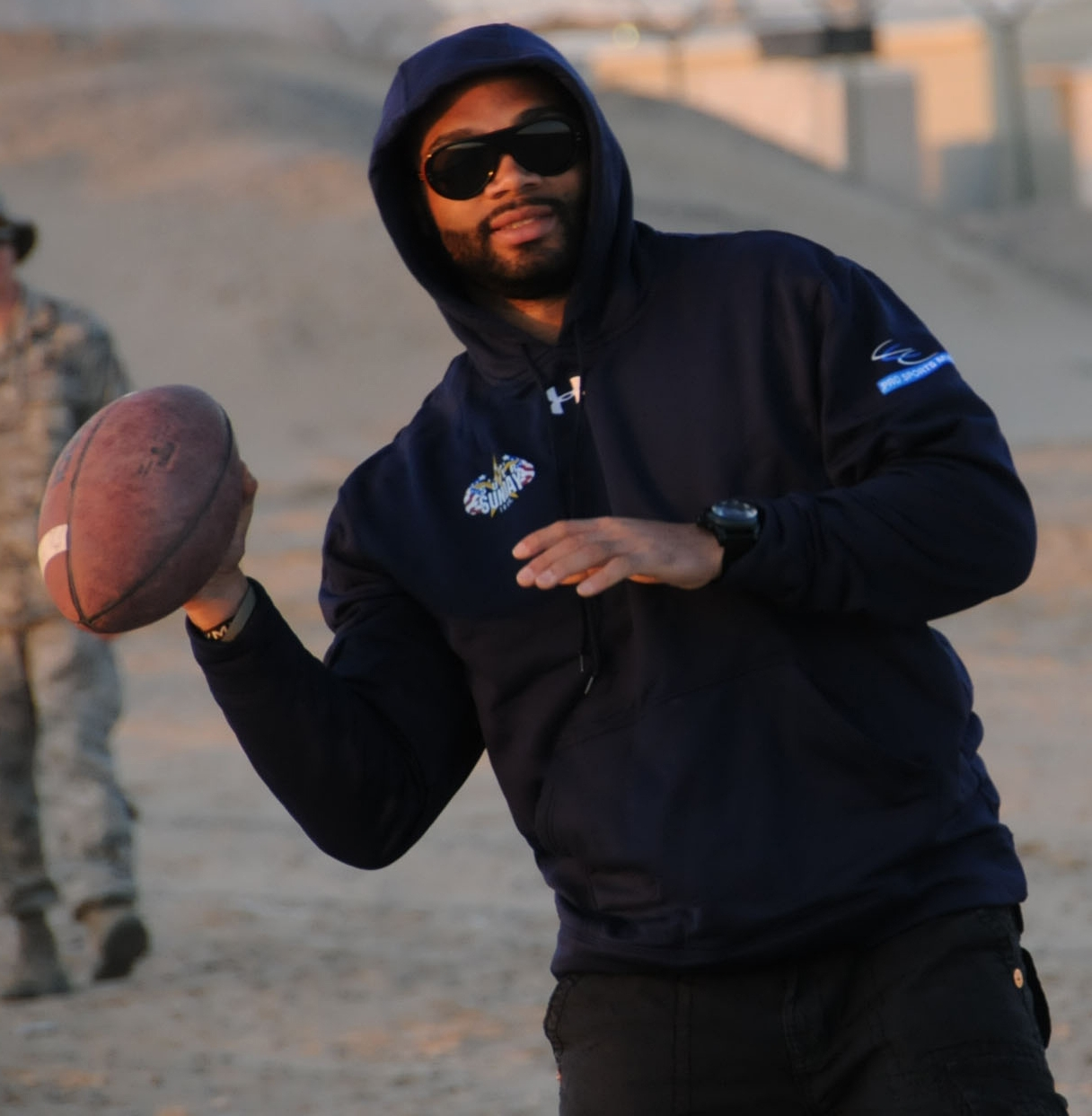
- Wallace in 2012

No. 15, 6, 9
- Positions: Quarterback, wide receiver

Personal information
- Born: August 6, 1980 (age 46); Sacramento, California, U.S.
- Listed height: 5 ft 11 in (1.80 m)
- Listed weight: 205 lb (93 kg)

Career information
- High school: Cordova (Rancho Cordova, California)
- College: Sacramento City College (1999–2000); Iowa State (2001–2002)
- NFL draft: 2003: 4th round, 110th overall pick

Career history

Playing
- Seattle Seahawks (2003–2009); Cleveland Browns (2010–2011); New Orleans Saints (2013)*; San Francisco 49ers (2013)*; Green Bay Packers (2013)
- * Offseason or practice squad member only

Coaching
- Episcopal School of Dallas (2017–2021) Assistant coach; Dallas Cowboys (2020) Coaching assistant; John Paul II High School (2022–2023) Assistant coach; Rock Hill High School (2023–2024) Assistant coach / wide receivers coach; St. Louis Battlehawks (2025) Quarterbacks coach

Awards and highlights
- Big 12 Offensive Newcomer of the Year (2001); Second-team All-Big 12 (2002)

Career NFL statistics
- Passing attempts: 788
- Passing completions: 468
- Completion percentage: 59.4%
- Passing yards: 4,947
- TD–INT: 31–14
- Passer rating: 80.8
- Rushing yards: 293
- Rushing touchdowns: 1
- Stats at Pro Football Reference

Seneca Sinclair Wallace (born August 6, 1980) is an American former professional football player who was a quarterback in the National Football League (NFL). He recently served as the quarterbacks coach for the St. Louis Battlehawks of the United Football League (UFL). He played college football for the Iowa State Cyclones and was selected by the Seattle Seahawks in the fourth round of the 2003 NFL draft. Wallace was also a member of the Cleveland Browns, New Orleans Saints, San Francisco 49ers, and Green Bay Packers. He became a coach after his playing career.

== Early life ==
Wallace attended Cordova High School in Rancho Cordova, California, and was a letterman in football and basketball. In basketball, he won All-Sierra Conference honors and All-Sacramento honorable mention honors.

== College career ==
Wallace attended Sacramento City College in order to stay close to home at his mother's request. After initially receiving only three offers, two at wide receiver, Wallace transferred to Iowa State University for his junior and senior year.

Wallace received widespread notice in 2002 while with the Iowa State Cyclones in a play famously known as "The Run," in which he traversed back to the 32 yard line before running it in for a 12-yard touchdown versus Texas Tech. It was later estimated that he ran 135 yards on the 12-yard touchdown rush. While quarterbacking the Iowa State Cyclones in 2001 and 2002, he threw 26 touchdowns and 27 interceptions.

== Professional career ==
Pre-draft measurables
Height	Weight	Arm length	Hand span	40-yard dash	10-yard split	20-yard split	20-yard shuttle	Three-cone drill	Vertical jump	Broad jump	Wonderlic
5 ft 11 3/8 in (1.81 m)	196 lb (89 kg)	31 in (0.79 m)	9 1/4 in (0.23 m)	4.56 s	1.62 s	2.67 s	4.14 s	6.98 s	38.0 in (0.97 m)	10 ft 7 in (3.23 m)	12, 14
All values from NFL Combine

=== Seattle Seahawks ===
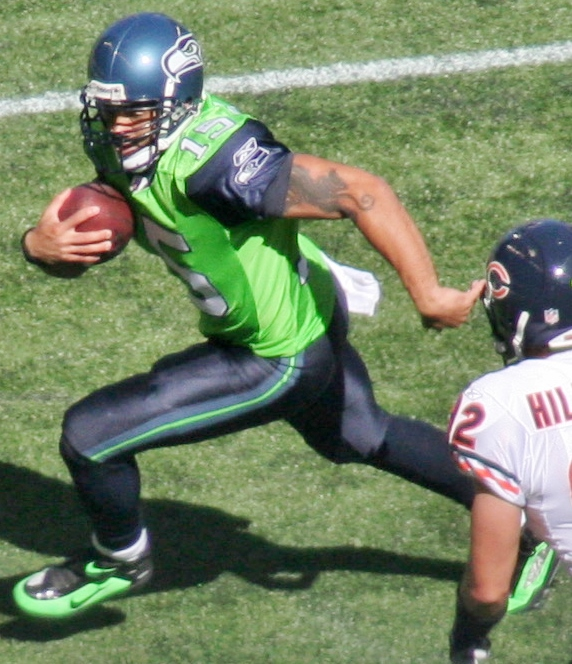
Wallace with the Seattle Seahawks in 2009

He was selected in the fourth round of the 2003 NFL draft out of Iowa State University. It is widely thought his draft value dropped because of his insistence that he play quarterback for the team, rather than wide receiver. Intrigued by his athleticism, the Seattle Seahawks gave him that chance. Wallace made his mark in the 2005 NFL playoffs when he caught an acrobatic 28-yard pass from Matt Hasselbeck in the NFC Championship game against former Seahawks cornerback Ken Lucas of the Carolina Panthers.

In 2006, Wallace started in four games as quarterback after an injury to Hasselbeck's right knee. Under his leadership, the team won two games and lost two. His passer rating was 76.2 for the 2006 season, passing just under 1,000 yards, throwing 8 touchdowns and 7 interceptions. He started at wide receiver in the Wild Card round playoff game on January 6, 2007, catching one pass for six yards on one target in a 21–20 loss to the Dallas Cowboys.

In 2007, Mike Holmgren began using Wallace as a wide receiver during the regular season in limited formations. By Week 7, Wallace had caught two passes, run two end arounds, and thrown an incomplete pass on an end around option pass.

In 2008, Wallace started two pre-season games at quarterback and had good statistics against the Minnesota Vikings and Oakland Raiders. After injuries to wide receivers that hurt the Seahawks, Wallace was moved to that position but strained a calf in his first game.

After the injury of Hasselbeck, he returned as a starter in week seven of the season at Tampa Bay, where the team lost 20–10. The next week, he led his team to a 34–13 win over San Francisco. In week 9, Wallace threw for the longest touchdown pass in Seattle Seahawks franchise history with a 90-yard completion to Koren Robinson in the Seahawks' first play from scrimmage. However, the Seahawks lost to the Philadelphia Eagles, 26–7. Wallace played again in the 21–19 road loss to the Miami Dolphins in week ten. Hasselbeck was cleared by team doctors to play and was the starter again for week 11. Because of another injury to Hasselbeck, Wallace started in week 14 against the New England Patriots, where he threw 20 completions in 28 attempts for 212 yards and three touchdowns. His passer rating for the game was 128.9. He also ran for 47 yards on three carries. However, a lost fumble by Wallace late in the fourth quarter led to a 24–21 Seahawks loss. The following week, he captured his second win as a starter as the Seahawks beat the St. Louis Rams 23–20 at the Edward Jones Dome. Hasselbeck returned from injury, but Wallace remained the starter for the rest of the season. Wallace had another good performance in a victory against the New York Jets in week 16, but lost to the eventual NFC champion Arizona Cardinals in week 17.

In his limited action, Wallace ended the 2008 NFL season as the league leader in Passing Touchdown to Interception Ratio, with 3.67.

=== Cleveland Browns ===
On March 8, 2010, Wallace was traded to the Cleveland Browns for a seventh round pick in the 2011 NFL draft. With this trade, Wallace was reunited with his former Seattle coach and then-Browns president Mike Holmgren. He made his regular-season debut September 12, 2010, after starting quarterback Jake Delhomme injured his ankle during a week 1 loss to the Tampa Bay Buccaneers. He would go on to start the next four games before suffering a high ankle sprain during week 5 versus the Atlanta Falcons. On March 3, 2011, Wallace signed a three-year deal with the Browns. Wallace was released by the Cleveland Browns after the conclusion of the 2012 preseason.

=== New Orleans Saints ===
On April 15, 2013, the New Orleans Saints signed Wallace to a one-year deal. On August 19, 2013, he was released by the Saints.

=== San Francisco 49ers ===
On August 22, 2013, he signed a one-year deal with the San Francisco 49ers. A week later on August 29, 2013, he asked for his release. He later said that (contrary to some news reports) he was not retiring, but had decided to leave the 49ers because he felt they were not giving him a chance to make the team, and had signed him only to pressure their principal backup quarterback, Colt McCoy, to accept a pay cut.

=== Green Bay Packers ===
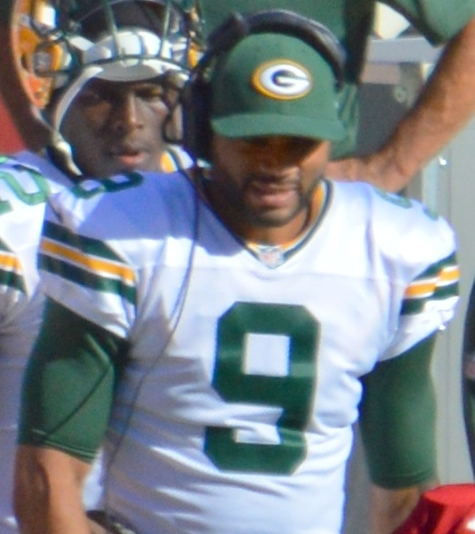
Wallace with the Green Bay Packers in 2013

On September 2, 2013, Wallace signed with the Green Bay Packers. He first played for the Packers on November 4, 2013, after an injury to the left shoulder of Aaron Rodgers in the first quarter of the Monday night game against the Chicago Bears. His first start for the Packers was on Sunday, November 10, 2013, against the Philadelphia Eagles. During the game's opening drive, Wallace suffered a season-ending groin injury and had to leave the game. He was replaced by quarterback Scott Tolzien, who made his first regular-season NFL appearance.

Wallace was the first African-American to start a game as quarterback for the Packers.

== Career statistics ==
=== NFL ===
==== Regular season ====
Year	Team	Games			Passing								Rushing				Sacks		Fumbles (Note: Fumbles lost data taken from Pro Football Reference career game log)		Receiving				
Year	Team	GP	GS	Record	Cmp	Att	Pct	Yds	Y/A	TD	Int	Rtg	Att	Yds	Avg	TD	Sck	SckY	Fum	Lost	Rec	Yds	Avg	Lng	TD
2003	SEA	0	0	DNP																					
2004	SEA	0	0	DNP																					
2005	SEA	7	0	–	13	25	52.0	173	6.9	1	1	70.9	6	−5	−0.8	0	3	20	2	0	0	0	0.0	0	0
2006	SEA	8	4	2–2	82	141	58.2	927	6.6	8	7	76.2	12	122	10.2	0	14	83	5	3	0	0	0.0	0	0
2007	SEA	10	0	–	19	28	67.9	215	7.7	2	1	99.6	4	17	4.3	0	3	13	1	1	2	47	23.5	29	0
2008	SEA	10	8	3–5	141	242	58.3	1,532	6.3	11	3	87.0	16	78	4.9	0	14	76	4	3	0	0	0.0	0	0
2009	SEA	13	2	0–2	78	120	65.0	700	5.8	3	2	81.9	16	2	0.1	1	9	59	5	2	2	29	14.5	24	0
2010	CLE	8	4	1–3	64	101	63.4	694	6.9	4	2	88.5	7	9	1.3	0	6	33	1	0	1	9	9.0	9	0
2011	CLE	6	3	0–3	55	107	51.4	567	5.3	2	2	65.4	7	70	10.0	0	6	30	1	1	1	21	21.0	21	0
2013	GB	2	1	0–1	16	24	66.7	139	5.8	0	1	64.4	0	0	0.0	0	4	20	0	0	0	0	0.0	0	0
Career		64	22	6– 16	468	788	59.4	4,947	6.3	31	19	80.8	68	293	4.3	1	59	339	19	10	6	106	17.7	29	0

==== Playoffs ====
Year	Team	Games			Passing								Rushing				Sacks		Fumbles		Receiving				
Year	Team	GP	GS	Record	Cmp	Att	Pct	Yds	Y/A	TD	Int	Rtg	Att	Yds	Avg	TD	Sck	SckY	Fum	Lost	Rec	Yds	Avg	Lng	TD
2003	SEA	0	0	DNP																					
2004	SEA	0	0	DNP																					
2005	SEA	2	0	–	0	0	0.0	0	0.0	0	0	0.0	0	0	0.0	0	0	0	0	0	1	28	28.0	28	0
2006	SEA	1	1	–	0	0	0.0	0	0.0	0	0	0.0	0	0	0.0	0	0	0	0	0	1	6	6.0	6	0
2007	SEA	1	0	–	0	0	0.0	0	0.0	0	0	0.0	0	0	0.0	0	0	0	0	0	0	0	0.0	0	0
2013	GB	0	0	DNP																					
Career		4	1	–	0	0	0.0	0	0.0	0	0	0.0	0	0	0.0	0	0	0	0	0	2	34	17	28	0

=== College ===
Season	Team	Games		Passing								Rushing				
Season	Team	GP	GS	Cmp	Att	Pct	Yds	Lng	TD	Int	Rtg	Att	Yds	Avg	Lng	TD
2001	Iowa State	11	11	167	269	62.1	2,044	54	11	9	132.7	114	475	4.2	60	7
2002	Iowa State	14	14	244	443	55.1	3,245	60	15	18	119.7	123	437	3.6	48	8
Career		25	25	411	712	57.7	5,289	60	26	27	124.6	237	912	3.8	60	15

== Coaching career ==
=== Episcopal School of Dallas ===
From 2017 to 2021 Seneca coached at the Episcopal School of Dallas as an assistant coach.

=== Dallas Cowboys ===
Wallace joined the Dallas Cowboys staff in 2020 as a camp assistant working with the quarterbacks.

=== John Paul II High School ===
In 2022, Wallace was an assistant coach for John Paul II High School.

=== St. Louis Battlehawks ===
On February 19, 2025, Wallace was hired to serve as the quarterbacks coach for the St. Louis Battlehawks of the United Football League.

== Post-career ==
In the summer of 2018, Wallace was the quarterback for Godspeed, a flag football team made of former professional American football players that participated in the American Flag Football League (AFFL). The team were crowned the champions of participating pro teams but lost in the final match to the amateur champion team.
