= Robert Fergusson (disambiguation) =

Robert Fergusson (1750–1774) was a Scottish poet.

Robert Fergusson may also refer to:

- Robert Cutlar Fergusson (1768–1838), Scottish lawyer
- Robert Fergusson, 9th Laird of Craigdarroch, see William Cunningham, 6th Earl of Glencairn
- Captain Robert Fergusson, founder of American paint manufacturer Rust-Oleum

== See also ==
- Robert Ferguson (disambiguation)
