= Solomon Bates =

American football player (born 1982)

No. 50
- Position: Linebacker

Personal information
- Born: April 18, 1982 (age 44); Culver City, California, U.S.
- Listed height: 6 ft 1 in (1.85 m)
- Listed weight: 243 lb (110 kg)

Career information
- High school: Canyon Springs (Moreno Valley, California)
- College: Arizona State
- NFL draft: 2003: 4th round, 135th overall pick

Career history
- Seattle Seahawks (2003–2004); Indianapolis Colts (2005)*
- * Offseason or practice squad member only

Career NFL statistics
- Total tackles: 37
- Pass deflections: 2
- Stats at Pro Football Reference

Solomon Augustus Bates (born April 18, 1982) is an American former professional football player who was a linebacker in the National Football League (NFL). He was selected by the Seattle Seahawks in the fourth round of the 2003 NFL draft. He played college football for the Arizona State Sun Devils.

== Early life ==
Bates was born in Culver City, California, and played high school football at Canyon Springs High School in Moreno Valley, California. He earned USA Today honorable mention All-American honors in 1999. He was rated the No. 13 linebacker in the country in the class of 1999 by SuperPrep.

== College career ==
Bates played college football for the Arizona State Sun Devils from 1999 to 2002. He recorded 42 tackles his freshman year in 1999, earning Sporting News first-team All-Freshman honors. He started all 12 games in 2000, totaling 99 tackles (70 of which were solo tackles), three sacks, four forced fumbles, two interceptions and eight pass breakups, garnering honorable mention All-Pac-10 recognition.

Bates played in 11 games, starting 10, in 2001, recording 49 tackles (19 solo), one sack, one fumble recovery and six pass breakups. His production reportedly dropped in 2001 due to being out of shape.

He majored in sociology at Arizona State.

Bates was invited to the 2003 Hula Bowl.

== Professional career ==
Bates was selected by the Seattle Seahawks in the fourth round, with the 135th overall pick, of the 2003 NFL draft. He officially signed with the team on July 24, 2003. He played in seven games during his rookie year in 2003, recording three solo tackles. Bates appeared in 10 games, starting three, in 2004, totaling 22 solo tackles, 12 assisted tackles and two pass breakups. He was waived by the Seahawks on August 8, 2005.

Bates signed with the Indianapolis Colts on August 9, 2005. He was waived by the Colts on August 11, 2005.

== Personal life ==
His son Alijah Bates was also a member of the Arizona State football team.
