= Bobby Ferguson =

Bobby Ferguson may refer to:

- Bobby Ferguson (footballer, born 1938) (1938–2018), English football player and manager
- Bobby Ferguson (footballer, born 1945), Scottish international football goalkeeper

== See also ==
- Robert Ferguson (disambiguation)
- Bob Ferguson (disambiguation)
