= Ade Jimoh =

American football player (born 1980)

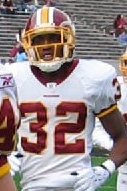

No. 23, 32, 35
- Position: Cornerback

Personal information
- Born: April 18, 1980 (age 46); Los Angeles, California, U.S.
- Listed height: 6 ft 1 in (1.85 m)
- Listed weight: 190 lb (86 kg)

Career information
- College: Utah State
- NFL draft: 2003: undrafted

Career history
- Washington Redskins (2003–2006); Chicago Bears (2007); New England Patriots (2008)*
- * Offseason or practice squad member only

Career NFL statistics
- Total tackles: 65
- Fumble recoveries: 1
- Pass deflections: 5
- Stats at Pro Football Reference

Adebola Olurotimi Jimoh (born April 18, 1980) is an American former professional football player who was a cornerback in the National Football League (NFL). He was signed by the Washington Redskins as an undrafted free agent in 2003. He played college football for the Utah State Aggies.

Jimoh was also a member of the Chicago Bears and New England Patriots. His name "Adebola" means "Crown meets wealth" in the Yoruba language

== Early life ==
Jimoh grew up in Canoga Park and attended El Camino Real High School where he was a two-year letterman and a second-team all-league selection, as well as a preseason third-team all-area pick. In his senior year, his team won the city championship.

== College career ==
Jimoh played college football for Utah State University. He started all 11 games at left corner his sophomore year in 2000 and earned second-team All-Big West honors as well as the team's outstanding defensive back. He also shared the team lead with two interceptions and had a team-high 12 pass deflections and a blocked kick. He started nine games at cornerback in 2001 and registered 39 tackles and an interception. He played in all 11 games for the Aggies in 2002 and recorded one interception for three yards and 53 tackles (34 solo).

== Professional career ==
=== Washington Redskins ===
Jimoh was signed by the Redskins in April 2003 as an undrafted rookie free agent. In 2003, Jimoh appeared in all 16 games with the Redskins as a reserve cornerback but mostly on special teams coverage units. In 2004, he appeared in 15 games as a reserve cornerback and was a valued special teams player, recording 20 special teams tackles on the season, tied for third-best on the team. His season was cut short late in the year when he suffered a season-ending knee injury. In 2005, he played in all 16 games and two playoff games, mostly as a reserve cornerback and special teams leader. He finished with ten tackles (nine solo) and 20 special teams tackles, fifth-best on the team.

=== Chicago Bears ===
On September 11, 2007, the Chicago Bears signed Jimoh to assist with special teams, due to the promotion of kick returner Danieal Manning to take the place of injured starting safety Mike Brown. Between September 16, 2007, and September 24, 2007, Jimoh was twice waived and then re-signed a few days later to make room for fill-in punter Dirk Johnson.

Jimoh suffered a broken collarbone on November 18, 2007, while playing on special teams. He was placed on injured reserve, ending his season.

=== New England Patriots ===
On August 13, 2008, Jimoh was signed by the New England Patriots. He was assigned No. 43 in New England. He was released on August 21 after the team signed offensive lineman Mike Flynn.
