= Bob Ferguson (footballer) =

English footballer

Personal information
- Full name: Robert Ferguson
- Date of birth: 25 July 1917
- Place of birth: Grangetown, North Riding of Yorkshire, England
- Date of death: 17 June 2006 (aged 88)
- Place of death: Marlow, Buckinghamshire, England
- Height: 5 ft 10 in (1.78 m)
- Position: Goalkeeper

Senior career*
Years	Team	Apps	(Gls)
–1935	Hurworth Juniors		
1935–1939	Middlesbrough	10	(0)
1939–1947	York City	26	(0)
1947–1949	Peterborough United	68	(0)
1950–1953	Goole Town		
Total		36	(0)
- * Club domestic league appearances and goals

Robert Ferguson (25 July 1917 – 17 June 2006) was an English professional footballer who played as a goalkeeper in the Football League for Middlesbrough and York City, in non-League football for Hurworth Juniors and Goole Town and was on the books of Peterborough United.
