= Bob Ferguson (American football executive) =

American football executive (born 1950)

Personal information
- Born: November 5, 1950 (age 76); Enumclaw, Washington, U.S.

Career information
- College: University of Washington

Career history
- Seattle Seahawks (1975–1980) Director of Sales and Special Events; Dallas Cowboys (1984) Performance testing supervisor; Buffalo Bills (1985–1986) Assistant director of player personnel; Buffalo Bills (1987–1988) Director of pro personnel; Buffalo Bills (1989–1992) Assistant general manager and director of pro personnel; Denver Broncos (1993–1995) Director of football operations and player personnel; Arizona Cardinals (1996) Special assistant to the president; Arizona Cardinals (1997–1998) Vice president of player personnel; Arizona Cardinals (1999–2002) General manager; Seattle Seahawks (2003–2004) General manager
- Executive profile at Pro Football Reference

Bob Ferguson (born November 5, 1950) is an American football executive who served as general manager of the Arizona Cardinals from 1999 to 2002 and the Seattle Seahawks from 2003 to 2004.

== Early life ==
Ferguson was born in Enumclaw, Washington and raised in Federal Way, Washington. He played linebacker for the University of Washington and earned a communications degree from there in 1973.

== Career ==
=== Early career ===
Ferguson joined the expansion Seattle Seahawks in 1975 as director of sales and special events. From 1981 to 1983 he was an area scout for a scouting combine that served the Buffalo Bills, Dallas Cowboys, San Francisco 49ers, and Seattle Seahawks. From 1984 to 1985 he was a performance testing supervisor for the Dallas Cowboys.

=== Buffalo Bills ===
Ferguson joined the Bills organization in 1985 and was named the team's director of pro personnel in 1986. In 1989 he was given the additional title of assistant general manager. He helped build the Bills teams that made four consecutive Super Bowls.

=== Denver Broncos ===
Following the dismissal of general manager Bill Polian, Ferguson left the Bills to become director of football operations and player personnel for the Denver Broncos. Ferguson oversaw Denver's college and professional scouting and worked with head coach Wade Phillips and general manager John Beake on player acquisition. The team credited Ferguson for its aggressive approach to free agency in 1993 and 1994, which saw the team sign Rod Bernstine, Robert Delpino, Anthony Miller, Brian Habib, Dave Wyman, and Ray Crockett. Wade Phillips was fired after the 1994 season and his successor, Mike Shanahan, removed Ferguson's power to take the initiative in pursuing free agents. Ferguson was fired on January 19, 1996.

=== Arizona Cardinals ===
On February 21, 1996, Ferguson was named special assistant to Arizona Cardinals president Bill Bidwill. As the team had no general manager, Ferguson, assistant GM Joe Woolley, director of pro scouting Keith Kidd, and head coach Vince Tobin made personnel decisions by committee. In 1997, Ferguson was named the Cardinals' vice president of player personnel. He traded the Cardinals first round pick in the 1998 NFL draft to the San Diego Chargers, who moved up to take quarterback Ryan Leaf, in exchange for picks used to take Andre Wadsworth, Corey Chavous, David Boston. Wadsworth was an all-rookie selection in 1998 and Boston and Chavous were Pro Bowl players, while Leaf is considered one of the biggest draft busts in the history of professional sports. In 1998, the Cardinals made the playoffs for the first time in 25 years and won their first playoff game in 50 years. On May 1, 1999, he became the team's general manager. During his tenure in Arizona, the Cardinals compiled a 41–71 record and made the playoffs once. He was fired on January 6, 2003.

=== Seattle Seahawks ===
On February 10, 2003, Ferguson was named general manager of the Seattle Seahawks. He succeeded Mike Holmgren, who agreed to step down as general manager, but remained as head coach. The Seahawks went 10–6 in 2003 and 9–7 in 2004; making the playoffs both seasons. He resigned on February 22, 2005, as part of an executive house-cleaning following the dismissal of team president Bob Whitsitt.
