= Robert Ferguson (footballer, born 1902) =

Scottish footballer

Personal information
- Full name: Robert Gibson Ferguson
- Date of birth: 5 January 1902
- Place of birth: Blythswood Hill, Scotland
- Height: 5 ft 9 in (1.75 m)
- Position: Centre-half

Senior career*
| Years | Team | Apps | (Gls) |
| 1919–1920 | Battlefield | | |
| 1920 | Queen's Park | | |
| 1920–1922 | Cambuslang Rangers | | |
| 1922–1925 | Sunderland | 32 | (1) |
| 1925–1932 | Middlesbrough | 139 | (2) |
| 1932–193? | Northwich Victoria | | |
- * Club domestic league appearances and goals

Robert Gibson Ferguson (born 5 January 1902) was a Scottish professional footballer who played as a centre-half for Sunderland.
