= Itula Mili =

American football player (born 1973)

No. 49, 89, 88
- Position: Tight end

Personal information
- Born: April 20, 1973 (age 53); Kahuku, Hawaii, U.S.
- Listed height: 6 ft 4 in (1.93 m)
- Listed weight: 260 lb (118 kg)

Career information
- High school: Kahuku
- College: BYU (1991, 1994–1996)
- NFL draft: 1997: 6th round, 174th overall pick

Career history
- Seattle Seahawks (1997–2006)

Awards and highlights
- First-team All-American (1996)

Career NFL statistics
- Receptions: 164
- Receiving yards: 1,743
- Receiving touchdowns: 13
- Stats at Pro Football Reference

Itula Mili (born April 20, 1973) is an American former professional football player who spent his entire 10-year career as a tight end for the Seattle Seahawks of the National Football League (NFL). He played college football for the BYU Cougars, earning first-team All-American honors in 1996.

== Early life ==
Mili attended Kahuku High School and lived in Lā'ie, Hawai'i, where he starred in football, basketball, and track. In football, he was an All-State selection. In track and field, Mili was the state high jump champion as a junior.

== College career ==
Mili chose to attend BYU where he majored in business management. Mili played tight end and half-back for the Cougars during his football career. He began his freshman season in 1991 and was second string the season after Ty Detmer's Heisman Trophy season for the cougars. In 1994, his sophomore season, Mili filled in two games for the injured starter Chad Lewis. At the start of his junior season, Mili was moved to the half-back position.

During his senior year in 1996, Mili was named by the AFCA to the first-team All-American team and selected to play in both the Hula and Senior Bowl. However, he was unable to play due to surgery to repair a knee injury that was sustained during the 1996 Western Athletic Conference championship game against Wyoming. Mili finished his college career with 125 receptions for 1,763 yards and 11 touchdowns for the Cougars, along with 13 carries for 50 yards.

== Professional career ==
Pre-draft measurables
Height	Weight	Arm length	Hand span	Bench press
6 ft 3 7/8 in (1.93 m)	262 lb (119 kg)	34 in (0.86 m)	9 5/8 in (0.24 m)	16 reps

He was drafted in the sixth round of the 1997 NFL draft by the Seahawks. He played on a Seahawks 2005 Super Bowl team that consisted of Walter Jones, Shaun Alexander, Matt Hasselbeck, Mack Strong, Steve Hutchinson, and fellow Samoan teammate Lofa Tatupu. On January 4, 2007, Mili was released from the Seahawks to make room for Ben Obomanu on the roster.
