= Alex Bannister =

American football player (born 1979)

No. 85, 80
- Position: Wide receiver

Personal information
- Born: April 23, 1979 (age 47); Cincinnati, Ohio, U.S.
- Listed height: 6 ft 5 in (1.96 m)
- Listed weight: 207 lb (94 kg)

Career information
- High school: Cincinnati (OH) Hughes Center
- College: Eastern Kentucky
- NFL draft: 2001: 5th round, 140th overall pick

Career history
- Seattle Seahawks (2001−2005); Chicago Bears (2006)*; Baltimore Ravens (2006)
- * Offseason or practice squad member only

Awards and highlights
- First-team All-Pro (2003); Pro Bowl (2003)

Career NFL statistics
- Receptions: 9
- Receiving yards: 121
- Touchdowns: 1
- Stats at Pro Football Reference

Alex Bannister (born April 23, 1979) is an American former professional football player who was a wide receiver for six seasons in the National Football League (NFL). He played college football for Eastern Kentucky University and was selected in the fifth round of the 2001 NFL draft by the Seattle Seahawks. In 2003, he was selected to the Pro Bowl, due to his special teams contributions.

Lex Bannister Fitness is a gym operated by Bannister in Bellingham, Washington, with a focus on Sweat Camps. Like many fitness boot camps, Bannister's classes focus on cross-training, plyometrics, and calisthenics, amongst other exercises, often with a focus on bodyweight movements.
