= 2003 NFL season =

American football season

Regular season
- Duration: September 4 – December 28, 2003

Playoffs
- Start date: January 3, 2004
- AFC Champions: New England Patriots
- NFC Champions: Carolina Panthers

Super Bowl XXXVIII
- Date: February 1, 2004
- Site: Reliant Stadium, Houston, Texas
- Champions: New England Patriots

Pro Bowl
- Date: February 8, 2004
- Site: Aloha Stadium

AFC teams: West, North, South, East
NFC teams: West, North, South, East

The 2003 NFL season was the 84th regular season of the National Football League (NFL).

Regular-season play was held from September 4, 2003, to December 28, 2003. Due to damage caused by the Cedar Fire, Qualcomm Stadium was used as an emergency shelter, and thus the Miami Dolphins–San Diego Chargers regular-season game on October 27 was instead played at Sun Devil Stadium, the home field of the Arizona Cardinals. This was the first season in NFL history where every team won at least 4 games.

The playoffs began on January 3, 2004. The NFL title was won by the New England Patriots when they defeated the Carolina Panthers 32–29 in Super Bowl XXXVIII at Reliant Stadium in Houston, Texas, on February 1.

== Draft ==
The 2003 NFL draft was held from April 26 to 27, 2003, at New York City's Theater at Madison Square Garden. With the first pick, the Cincinnati Bengals selected quarterback Carson Palmer from the University of Southern California.

== Referee changes ==
Dick Hantak and Bob McElwee retired in the 2003 off-season. Hantak joined the league as a back judge (the position title was changed to field judge in 1998) in 1978, and was assigned Super Bowl XVII in that position. He was promoted to referee in 1986, working Super Bowl XXVII. McElwee joined the NFL in 1976 as a line judge, and became a referee in 1980. He was the referee for three Super Bowls: XXII, XXVIII, and XXXIV. Walt Anderson and Pete Morelli were promoted to referee to replace Hantak and McElwee.

== Major rule changes ==
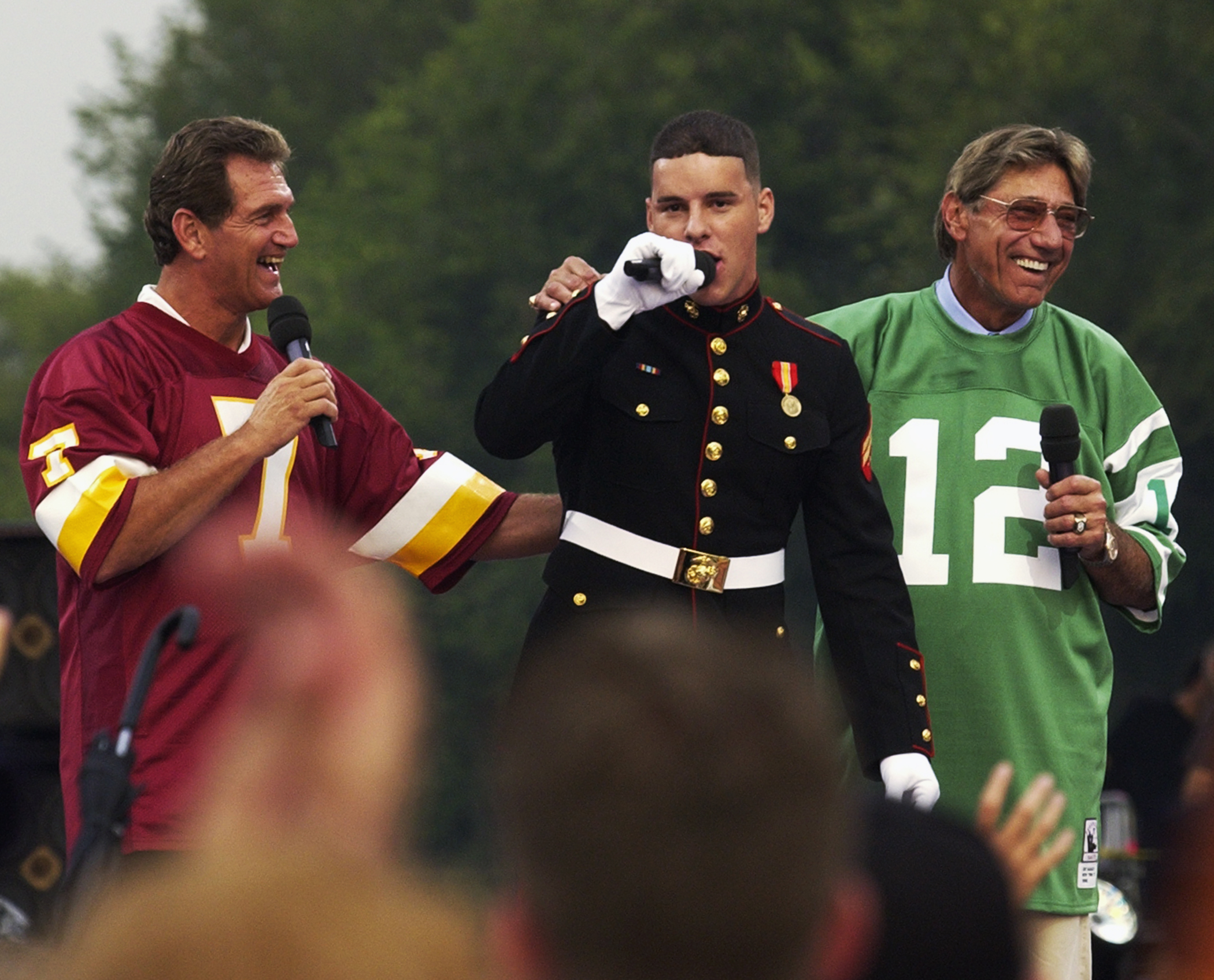
"NFL Kickoff" event on September 4, 2003: Joe Theismann (L) and Joe Namath (R) at a military tribute

- If an onside kick inside the final five minutes of the game does not go 10 yards, goes out of bounds, or is touched illegally, the receiving team will have the option of accepting the penalty and getting the ball immediately. Previously, the kicking team was penalized, but had another chance to kick again from five yards back.
- League officials encouraged networks to immediately cut to a commercial break if an instant replay challenge review was initiated. Previously networks were generally not permitted to utilize those game stoppages for their prescribed commercial periods.

== 2003 deaths ==
- John Butler: A former general manager with the Buffalo Bills, whose team qualified for Super Bowl XXVIII and the San Diego Chargers, he died of lymphoma on April 11, 2003.
- David Woodley: Having played for the Miami Dolphins in Super Bowl XVII, Woodley died from complications due to kidney and liver failure on May 4, 2003. Twenty years after Super Bowl XVII, he became the youngest Super Bowl starting quarterback to die, until the death of Super Bowl XXXIV starter Steve McNair at age 36 in 2009. Woodley was buried at St. Joseph Cemetery in Shreveport, alongside his parents.

=== Pro Football Hall of Fame ===
- Sid Gillman: A former head coach and general manager with the San Diego Chargers, Gillman died in his sleep on January 3, 2003, at the age of 91. He was interred in the Hillside Memorial Park Cemetery in Culver City, California.

== Notable Retirements ==
- John Jackson
- Raghib Ismail
- Qadry Ismail
- Darrell Green
- Marvcus Patton
- Desmond Howard
- Bryan Cox
- James Allen
- Brenden Stai
- Bob Christian
- Henry Jones
- Willie Jones
- Damon Gibson
- Eric Metcalf

== Final regular season standings ==
AFC East
| | W | L | T | PCT | DIV | CONF | PF | PA | STK |
|---|---|---|---|---|---|---|---|---|---|
| ^{(1)} New England Patriots | 14 | 2 | 0 | .875 | 5–1 | 11–1 | 348 | 238 | W12 |
| Miami Dolphins | 10 | 6 | 0 | .625 | 4–2 | 7–5 | 311 | 261 | W2 |
| Buffalo Bills | 6 | 10 | 0 | .375 | 2–4 | 4–8 | 243 | 279 | L3 |
| New York Jets | 6 | 10 | 0 | .375 | 1–5 | 6–6 | 283 | 299 | L2 |

AFC North
| | W | L | T | PCT | DIV | CONF | PF | PA | STK |
|---|---|---|---|---|---|---|---|---|---|
| ^{(4)} Baltimore Ravens | 10 | 6 | 0 | .625 | 4–2 | 7–5 | 391 | 281 | W2 |
| Cincinnati Bengals | 8 | 8 | 0 | .500 | 3–3 | 6–6 | 346 | 384 | L2 |
| Pittsburgh Steelers | 6 | 10 | 0 | .375 | 3–3 | 5–7 | 300 | 327 | L1 |
| Cleveland Browns | 5 | 11 | 0 | .313 | 2–4 | 3–9 | 254 | 322 | W1 |

AFC South
| | W | L | T | PCT | DIV | CONF | PF | PA | STK |
|---|---|---|---|---|---|---|---|---|---|
| ^{(3)} Indianapolis Colts | 12 | 4 | 0 | .750 | 5–1 | 9–3 | 447 | 336 | W1 |
| ^{(5)} Tennessee Titans | 12 | 4 | 0 | .750 | 4–2 | 8–4 | 435 | 324 | W3 |
| Jacksonville Jaguars | 5 | 11 | 0 | .313 | 2–4 | 3–9 | 276 | 331 | L1 |
| Houston Texans | 5 | 11 | 0 | .313 | 1–5 | 3–9 | 255 | 380 | L4 |

AFC West
| | W | L | T | PCT | DIV | CONF | PF | PA | STK |
|---|---|---|---|---|---|---|---|---|---|
| ^{(2)} Kansas City Chiefs | 13 | 3 | 0 | .813 | 5–1 | 10–2 | 484 | 332 | W1 |
| ^{(6)} Denver Broncos | 10 | 6 | 0 | .625 | 5–1 | 9–3 | 381 | 301 | L1 |
| Oakland Raiders | 4 | 12 | 0 | .250 | 1–5 | 3–9 | 270 | 379 | L2 |
| San Diego Chargers | 4 | 12 | 0 | .250 | 1–5 | 2–10 | 313 | 441 | W1 |

NFC East
| | W | L | T | PCT | DIV | CONF | PF | PA | STK |
|---|---|---|---|---|---|---|---|---|---|
| ^{(1)} Philadelphia Eagles | 12 | 4 | 0 | .750 | 5–1 | 9–3 | 374 | 287 | W1 |
| ^{(6)} Dallas Cowboys | 10 | 6 | 0 | .625 | 5–1 | 8–4 | 289 | 260 | L1 |
| Washington Redskins | 5 | 11 | 0 | .313 | 1–5 | 3–9 | 287 | 372 | L3 |
| New York Giants | 4 | 12 | 0 | .250 | 1–5 | 3–9 | 243 | 387 | L8 |

NFC North
| | W | L | T | PCT | DIV | CONF | PF | PA | STK |
|---|---|---|---|---|---|---|---|---|---|
| ^{(4)} Green Bay Packers | 10 | 6 | 0 | .625 | 4–2 | 7–5 | 442 | 307 | W4 |
| Minnesota Vikings | 9 | 7 | 0 | .563 | 4–2 | 7–5 | 416 | 353 | L1 |
| Chicago Bears | 7 | 9 | 0 | .438 | 2–4 | 4–8 | 283 | 346 | L1 |
| Detroit Lions | 5 | 11 | 0 | .313 | 2–4 | 4–8 | 270 | 379 | W1 |

NFC South
| | W | L | T | PCT | DIV | CONF | PF | PA | STK |
|---|---|---|---|---|---|---|---|---|---|
| ^{(3)} Carolina Panthers | 11 | 5 | 0 | .688 | 5–1 | 9–3 | 325 | 304 | W3 |
| New Orleans Saints | 8 | 8 | 0 | .500 | 3–3 | 7–5 | 340 | 326 | W1 |
| Tampa Bay Buccaneers | 7 | 9 | 0 | .438 | 2–4 | 6–6 | 301 | 264 | L2 |
| Atlanta Falcons | 5 | 11 | 0 | .313 | 2–4 | 4–8 | 299 | 422 | W2 |

NFC West
| | W | L | T | PCT | DIV | CONF | PF | PA | STK |
|---|---|---|---|---|---|---|---|---|---|
| ^{(2)} St. Louis Rams | 12 | 4 | 0 | .750 | 4–2 | 8–4 | 447 | 328 | L1 |
| ^{(5)} Seattle Seahawks | 10 | 6 | 0 | .625 | 5–1 | 8–4 | 404 | 327 | W2 |
| San Francisco 49ers | 7 | 9 | 0 | .438 | 2–4 | 6–6 | 384 | 337 | L1 |
| Arizona Cardinals | 4 | 12 | 0 | .250 | 1–5 | 3–9 | 225 | 452 | W1 |

=== Conference standings ===
AFC
| # | Team | Division | W | L | T | PCT | DIV | CONF | SOS | SOV | STK |
|---|---|---|---|---|---|---|---|---|---|---|---|
Division leaders
| 1 | New England Patriots | East | 14 | 2 | 0 | .875 | 5–1 | 11–1 | .484 | .492 | W12 |
| 2 | Kansas City Chiefs | West | 13 | 3 | 0 | .813 | 5–1 | 10–2 | .418 | .385 | W1 |
| 3 (Note: Indianapolis finished ahead of Tennessee based upon head-to-head sweep.) | Indianapolis Colts | South | 12 | 4 | 0 | .750 | 5–1 | 9–3 | .492 | .448 | W1 |
| 4 | Baltimore Ravens | North | 10 | 6 | 0 | .625 | 4–2 | 7–5 | .457 | .400 | W2 |
Wild cards
| 5 | Tennessee Titans | South | 12 | 4 | 0 | .750 | 4–2 | 8–4 | .473 | .401 | W3 |
| 6 (Note: Denver finished as the second Wild Card instead of Miami based upon better conference record.) | Denver Broncos | West | 10 | 6 | 0 | .625 | 5–1 | 9–3 | .500 | .406 | L1 |
Did not qualify for the postseason
| 7 | Miami Dolphins | East | 10 | 6 | 0 | .625 | 4–2 | 7–5 | .512 | .388 | W2 |
| 8 | Cincinnati Bengals | North | 8 | 8 | 0 | .500 | 3–3 | 6–6 | .457 | .469 | L2 |
| 9 (Note: Pittsburgh finished ahead of Buffalo based upon conference win percentage. Division tiebreak was initially used to eliminate New York Jets.) | Pittsburgh Steelers | North | 6 | 10 | 0 | .375 | 3–3 | 5–7 | .500 | .365 | L1 |
| 10 (Note: Buffalo finished ahead of New York Jets based upon better division record.) | Buffalo Bills | East | 6 | 10 | 0 | .375 | 2–4 | 4–8 | .570 | .438 | L3 |
| 11 | New York Jets | East | 6 | 10 | 0 | .375 | 1–5 | 6–6 | .527 | .396 | L2 |
| 12 (Note: Jacksonville finished ahead of Cleveland based upon better record against common opponents (Jacksonville was 2–3 against Cleveland’s 0–5 versus New England, Indianapolis, Baltimore and San Diego). Division tiebreaker was initially used to eliminate Houston.) (Note: Jacksonville finished ahead of Houston based upon better conference record.) | Jacksonville Jaguars | South | 5 | 11 | 0 | .313 | 2–4 | 3–9 | .543 | .453 | L1 |
| 13 (Note: Cleveland finished ahead of Houston based upon better record against common opponents (Cleveland was 1–4 against Houston‘s 0–5 versus New England, Kansas City, Indianapolis and Cincinnati.)) | Cleveland Browns | North | 5 | 11 | 0 | .313 | 2–4 | 3–9 | .539 | .363 | W1 |
| 14 | Houston Texans | South | 5 | 11 | 0 | .313 | 1–5 | 3–9 | .570 | .463 | L4 |
| 15 (Note: Oakland finished ahead of San Diego based upon conference record) | Oakland Raiders | West | 4 | 12 | 0 | .250 | 1–5 | 3–9 | .516 | .484 | L2 |
| 16 | San Diego Chargers | West | 4 | 12 | 0 | .250 | 1–5 | 2–10 | .504 | .359 | W1 |
Tiebreakers (Note: When breaking ties for three or more teams under the NFL's rules, they are first broken within divisions, then comparing only the highest-ranked remaining team from each division.)

NFC
| # | Team | Division | W | L | T | PCT | DIV | CONF | SOS | SOV | STK |
|---|---|---|---|---|---|---|---|---|---|---|---|
Division leaders
| 1 (Note: Philadelphia was #1 NFC seed ahead of St. Louis based upon better conference record.) | Philadelphia Eagles | East | 12 | 4 | 0 | .750 | 5–1 | 9–3 | .477 | .438 | W1 |
| 2 | St. Louis Rams | West | 12 | 4 | 0 | .750 | 4–2 | 8–4 | .434 | .443 | L1 |
| 3 | Carolina Panthers | South | 11 | 5 | 0 | .688 | 5–1 | 9–3 | .445 | .398 | W3 |
| 4 | Green Bay Packers | North | 10 | 6 | 0 | .625 | 4–2 | 7–5 | .488 | .438 | W4 |
Wild cards
| 5 (Note: Seattle was #5 NFC seed ahead of Dallas based upon strength of victory.) | Seattle Seahawks | West | 10 | 6 | 0 | .625 | 5–1 | 8–4 | .465 | .406 | W2 |
| 6 | Dallas Cowboys | East | 10 | 6 | 0 | .625 | 5–1 | 8–4 | .461 | .388 | L1 |
Did not qualify for the postseason
| 7 | Minnesota Vikings | North | 9 | 7 | 0 | .563 | 4–2 | 7–5 | .457 | .500 | L1 |
| 8 | New Orleans Saints | South | 8 | 8 | 0 | .500 | 3–3 | 7–5 | .500 | .375 | W1 |
| 9 (Note: San Francisco finished ahead of Tampa Bay based upon head-to-head victory. Conference record tiebreak was used to eliminate Chicago.) (Note: San Francisco and Tampa Bay finished ahead of Chicago by virtue of better conference record.) | San Francisco 49ers | West | 7 | 9 | 0 | .438 | 2–4 | 6–6 | .512 | .473 | L1 |
| 10 | Tampa Bay Buccaneers | South | 7 | 9 | 0 | .438 | 2–4 | 6–6 | .508 | .438 | L2 |
| 11 | Chicago Bears | North | 7 | 9 | 0 | .438 | 2–4 | 4–8 | .488 | .366 | L1 |
| 12 (Note: Atlanta finished ahead of Detroit based upon better win percentage against common opponents (Atlanta were 2–3 against Detroit’s 1–4 versus St. Louis, Carolina, Dallas and Minnesota). Conference record tiebreak was used to eliminate Washington.) (Note: Atlanta and Detroit finished ahead of Washington by virtue of better conference record.) | Atlanta Falcons | South | 5 | 11 | 0 | .313 | 2–4 | 4–8 | .539 | .463 | W2 |
| 13 | Detroit Lions | North | 5 | 11 | 0 | .313 | 2–4 | 4–8 | .535 | .463 | W1 |
| 14 | Washington Redskins | East | 5 | 11 | 0 | .313 | 1–5 | 3–9 | .531 | .488 | L3 |
| 15 (Note: New York Giants finished ahead of Arizona based upon better win percentage against common opponents (New York Giants were 2–3 against Arizona’s 1–4 versus St. Louis, Carolina, Dallas and Minnesota).) | New York Giants | East | 4 | 12 | 0 | .250 | 1–5 | 3–9 | .555 | .500 | L8 |
| 16 | Arizona Cardinals | West | 4 | 12 | 0 | .250 | 1–5 | 3–9 | .543 | .531 | W1 |
Tiebreakers (Note: When breaking ties for three or more teams under the NFL's rules, they are first broken within divisions, then comparing only the highest-ranked remaining team from each division.)

== Playoffs ==
Within each conference, the four division winners and the top two non-division winners with the best overall regular season records) qualified for the playoffs. The four division winners are seeded 1–4 based on their overall won-lost-tied record, and the wild card teams are seeded 5–6. The NFL does not use a fixed bracket playoff system, and there are no restrictions regarding teams from the same division matching up in any round. In the first round, dubbed the wild-card playoffs or wild-card weekend, the third-seeded division winner hosts the sixth-seed wild card, and the fourth seed hosts the fifth. The 1 and 2 seeds from each conference received a first-round bye. In the second round, the divisional playoffs, the number 1 seed hosts the worst-surviving seed from the first round (seed 4, 5, or 6), while the number 2 seed will play the other team (seed 3, 4, or 5). The two surviving teams from each conference's divisional playoff games met in the respective AFC and NFC Conference Championship games, hosted by the higher seed. Although the Super Bowl, the championship round of the playoffs, is played at a neutral site, the designated home team is based on an annual rotation by conference.

Playoff seeds
| Seed | AFC | NFC |
|---|---|---|
| 1 | New England Patriots (East winner) | Philadelphia Eagles (East winner) |
| 2 | Kansas City Chiefs (West winner) | St. Louis Rams (West winner) |
| 3 | Indianapolis Colts (South winner) | Carolina Panthers (South winner) |
| 4 | Baltimore Ravens (North winner) | Green Bay Packers (North winner) |
| 5 | Tennessee Titans (wild card) | Seattle Seahawks (wild card) |
| 6 | Denver Broncos (wild card) | Dallas Cowboys (wild card) |

== Bracket ==
Jan 3 – Bank of America Stadium | Jan 10 – Edward Jones Dome
6 | Dallas | 10
3 | Carolina | 29**
3 | Carolina | 29 | Jan 18 – Lincoln Financial Field
2 | St. Louis | 23
NFC
Jan 4 – Lambeau Field | 3 | Carolina | 14
Jan 11 – Lincoln Financial Field
1 | Philadelphia | 3
5 | Seattle | 27 | NFC Championship
4 | Green Bay | 17
4 | Green Bay | 33* | Feb 1 – Reliant Stadium
1 | Philadelphia | 20*
Wild-card round
Divisional round
Jan 4 – RCA Dome | N3 | Carolina | 29
Jan 11 – Arrowhead Stadium
A1 | New England | 32
6 | Denver | 10 | Super Bowl XXXVIII
3 | Indianapolis | 38
3 | Indianapolis | 41 | Jan 18 – Gillette Stadium
2 | Kansas City | 31
AFC
Jan 3 – M&T Bank Stadium | 3 | Indianapolis | 14
Jan 10 – Gillette Stadium
1 | New England | 24
5 | Tennessee | 20 | AFC Championship
5 | Tennessee | 14
4 | Baltimore | 17
1 | New England | 17

* Indicates OT periods

== Milestones ==
The following teams and players set all-time NFL records during the season:

| Record | Player or team | Date/opponent | Previous record holder |
|---|---|---|---|
| Most touchdowns, season | Priest Holmes, Kansas City (27) | December 28, vs. Chicago | Marshall Faulk, St. Louis, 2000 (26) |
| Most rushing yards gained, game | Jamal Lewis, Baltimore (295) | September 14, vs. Cleveland | Corey Dillon, Cincinnati vs. Denver, October 22, 2000 (278) |
| Most consecutive field goals | Mike Vanderjagt, Indianapolis | December 28, at Houston | Gary Anderson, 1997–98 (40) |
| Most consecutive road games lost | Detroit Lions | December 21, vs. Carolina | Houston Oilers, 1981–84 (23) |
| Most consecutive games with a sack | Tampa Bay Buccaneers (69) | November 9, 2003 | Dallas Cowboys (68) |

== Statistical leaders ==
=== Team ===
| Points scored | Kansas City Chiefs (484) |
| Total yards gained | Minnesota Vikings (6,294) |
| Yards rushing | Baltimore Ravens (2,674) |
| Yards passing | Indianapolis Colts (4,179) |
| Fewest points allowed | New England Patriots (238) |
| Fewest total yards allowed | Dallas Cowboys (4,056) |
| Fewest rushing yards allowed | Tennessee Titans (1,295) |
| Fewest passing yards allowed | Dallas Cowboys (2,631) |

=== Individual ===
| Scoring | Jeff Wilkins, St. Louis (163 points) |
| Touchdowns | Priest Holmes, Kansas City (27 TDs) |
| Most field goals made | Jeff Wilkins, St. Louis (39 FGs) |
| Rushing | Jamal Lewis, Baltimore (2,066 yards) |
| Passing | Peyton Manning, Indianapolis (4,267 yards) |
| Passing touchdowns | Brett Favre, Green Bay (32 TDs) |
| Pass receiving | Torry Holt, St. Louis (117 catches) |
| Pass receiving yards | Torry Holt, St. Louis (1,696) |
| Pass receiving touchdowns | Randy Moss, Minnesota (17 touchdowns) |
| Punt returns | Dante Hall, Kansas City (16.3 average yards) |
| Kickoff returns | Jerry Azumah, Chicago (29.0 average yards) |
| Interceptions | Brian Russell, Minnesota and Tony Parrish, San Francisco (9) |
| Punting | Shane Lechler, Oakland (46.9 average yards) |
| Sacks | Michael Strahan, New York Giants (18.5) |

== Awards ==
| Most Valuable Player | Peyton Manning, quarterback, Indianapolis and Steve McNair, quarterback, Tennessee Titans (as of 2025, this is the most recent season without a consensus MVP) |
| Coach of the Year | Bill Belichick, New England |
| Offensive Player of the Year | Jamal Lewis, running back, Baltimore |
| Defensive Player of the Year | Ray Lewis, linebacker, Baltimore |
| Offensive Rookie of the Year | Anquan Boldin, wide receiver, Arizona |
| Defensive Rookie of the Year | Terrell Suggs, linebacker, Baltimore |
| NFL Comeback Player of the Year | Jon Kitna, quarterback, Cincinnati |
| Walter Payton NFL Man of the Year | Will Shields, guard, Kansas City |
| Super Bowl Most Valuable Player | Tom Brady, quarterback, New England |

== Head coach/front office changes ==
Head coach

- Cincinnati Bengals – Marvin Lewis replaced Dick LeBeau who was fired following the 2002 season.
- Dallas Cowboys – Bill Parcells replaced Dave Campo who was fired following the 2002 season.
- Detroit Lions – Steve Mariucci replaced Marty Mornhinweg who was fired following the 2002 season.
- Jacksonville Jaguars – Jack Del Rio replaced Tom Coughlin who was fired following the 2002 season.
- San Francisco 49ers – Dennis Erickson replaced Steve Mariucci who was fired following the 2002 season.

Front office

- Arizona Cardinals – Rod Graves replaced Bob Ferguson, who was fired following the 2002 season.
- Jacksonville Jaguars – James "Shack" Harris replaced former head coach Tom Coughlin, who was fired following the 2002 season.
- Seattle Seahawks – Bob Ferguson replaced head coach Mike Holmgren, who agreed to step down as general manager to focus on coaching the team.
- San Diego Chargers – A. J. Smith replaced John Butler, who died of lymphoma on April 11, 2003.

== Stadium changes ==
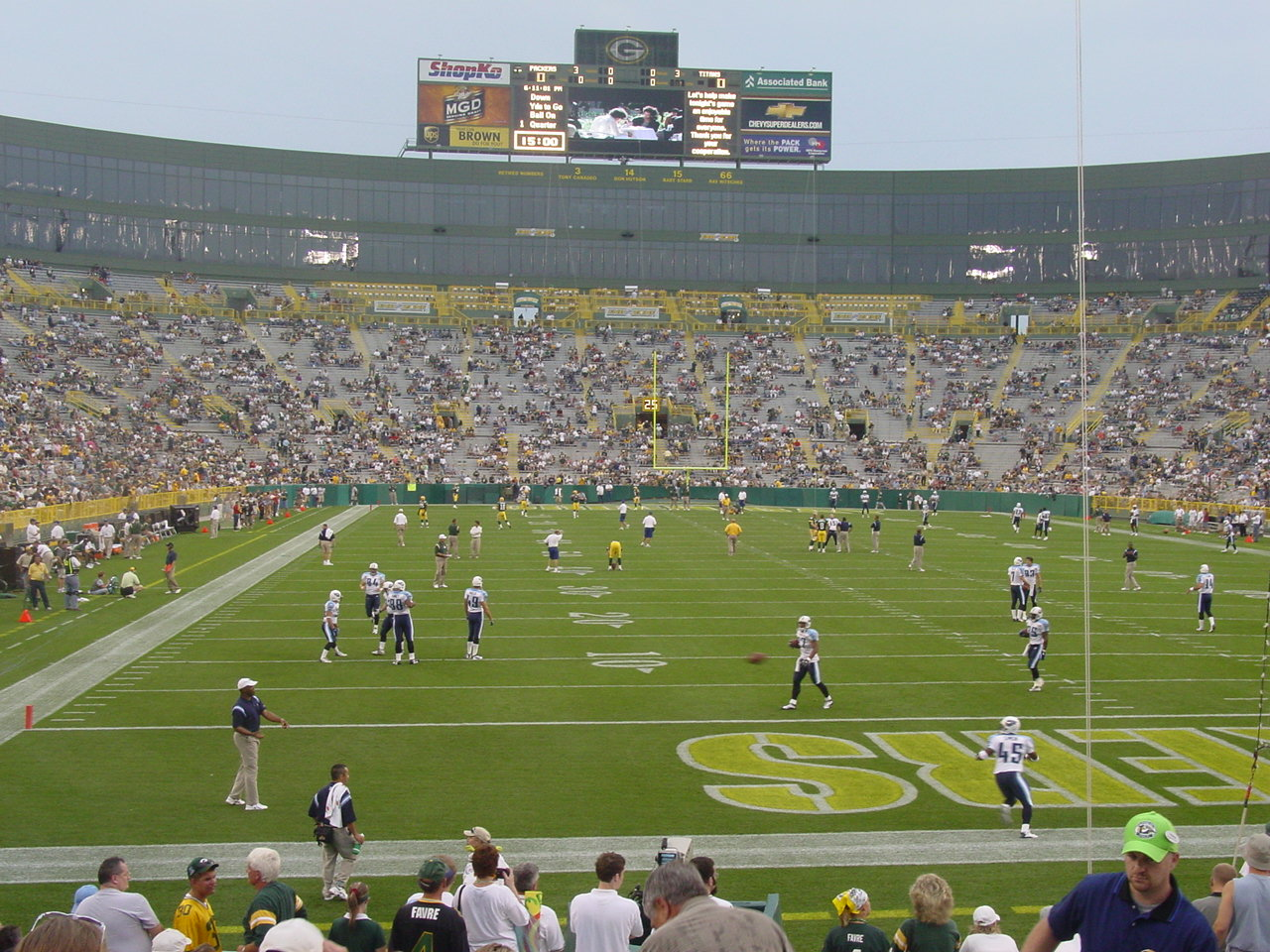
Tennessee at Green Bay in the preseason; both teams made the playoffs

- Baltimore Ravens: Ravens Stadium was renamed M&T Bank Stadium after M&T Bank acquired the naming rights
- Chicago Bears: The Bears moved back to a newly renovated Soldier Field after temporarily playing in 2002 at Memorial Stadium in Champaign, Illinois
- Philadelphia Eagles: The Eagles moved from Veterans Stadium to Lincoln Financial Field, with Lincoln Financial Group acquiring the naming rights
- San Francisco 49ers: After the naming rights deal with 3Com expired, the stadium was officially renamed San Francisco Stadium at Candlestick Point instead of its original Candlestick Park name

In addition, new turf was installed for the following teams:

- Atlanta Falcons: New FieldTurf surface
- Buffalo Bills: New AstroPlay home turf
- New Orleans Saints: New AstroPlay home turf by mid-season
- New York Giants, New York Jets: New FieldTurf surface replacing natural grass.

== New uniforms ==
- The Atlanta Falcons unveiled a new uniform design featuring red trim down the sides of both the jerseys and pants. The pants were switched from gray to white, and black pants were also introduced for selected games. Black remained the primary jersey color while a red alternate jersey was also introduced. The falcons helmet logo was redesigned to be more aggressive and closely resemble a capital "F".
- The Cincinnati Bengals added new alternate black pants with their black jerseys for select home games.
- The Cleveland Browns added new alternate orange pants last worn during the 1970s-early 1980s Kardiac Kids era of coach Sam Rutigliano.
- The Denver Broncos introduced blue pants with orange streaks to match with their blue jerseys.
- The Detroit Lions introduced a new design that added black trim to their logo and jerseys, and changed their face masks from blue to black.
- The Houston Texans added red third alternate uniforms.
- The Miami Dolphins added orange third alternate uniforms.
- The New England Patriots added silver third alternate uniforms.
- The New Orleans Saints wore gold pants full time, discontinuing using black pants with their white jerseys.
- The Philadelphia Eagles added silver trim to the jersey numbers on uniforms, and black third alternate uniforms.
- The St. Louis Rams added alternate blue pants to their road uniforms.
- The San Diego Chargers wore white pants instead of blue with their white jerseys. They wore blue pants with their blue jerseys for the game vs. the Dolphins which had to be moved from San Diego to Arizona due to wildfires in southern California.
- The Tennessee Titans added powder blue third alternate uniforms.

== Television ==
This was the sixth year under the league's eight-year broadcast contracts with ABC, CBS, Fox, and ESPN to televise Monday Night Football, the AFC package, the NFC package, and Sunday Night Football, respectively.

At Fox, Tony Siragusa joined Dick Stockton and Daryl Johnston on the network's #2 broadcast team in a sideline analyst role instead of the traditional sideline reporter.

At CBS it was Greg Gumbel’s final season as lead play by play commentator with Phil Simms, and Armen Keteyian. It would be Beasley Reece’s last season as color commentator for the first time since 1999, after serving as a sideline reporter from 2000-2002. This would also be The SEC football on CBS’s Tim Brando and Spencer Tillman’s last season with the NFL on CBS after week 2 as they were no longer needed being replaced by Bill Macatee. Also on The NFL today studio it was Jim Nantz’s final season as studio host as he and Greg Gumbel would trade places the following year. Verne Lundquist would call his first NFL game at CBS since 2000 week 1 covering the Patriots Bills matchup with his former partner Dan Dierdorf.
