= National Register of Historic Places listings in Cowlitz County, Washington =

Location of Cowlitz County in Washington

This list presents the full set of buildings, structures, objects, sites, or districts designated on the National Register of Historic Places in Cowlitz County, Washington, and offers brief descriptive information about each of them. The National Register recognizes places of national, state, or local historic significance across the United States. Out of over 90,000 National Register sites nationwide, Washington is home to approximately 1,500, and 32 of those are found partially or wholly in Cowlitz County.

This National Park Service list is complete through NPS recent listings posted December 12, 2025.

== Current listings ==
	Name on the Register	Image	Date listed	Location	City or town	Description
1	Berwind–Purcell House	Berwind–Purcell House	July 6, 2010 (#10000416)	808 Lone Oak Rd. 46°10′56″N 122°57′58″W	Longview	
2	Big Four Furniture Building	Big Four Furniture Building	December 5, 1985 (#85003013)	1329 Commerce Ave. 46°08′18″N 122°55′54″W	Longview	Built in 1924 for Lumberman's Bank. Civic, Cultural, and Commercial Resources of Longview Thematic Resource MPS
3	Adam Catlin House	Adam Catlin House	December 9, 1994 (#94001434)	202 NW. Second Ave. 46°08′49″N 122°54′55″W	Kelso	
4	Columbia Theater	Columbia Theater	December 5, 1985 (#85003014)	1225 Vandercook Way; 46°08′27″N 122°55′53″W	Longview	Civic, Cultural, and Commercial Resources of Longview Thematic Resource MPS
5	First Christian Church	First Christian Church	December 5, 1985 (#85003015)	2000 E. Kessler Blvd. 46°07′53″N 122°56′45″W	Longview	Civic, Cultural, and Commercial Resources of Longview Thematic Resource MPS
6	Jim Creek Bridge	Jim Creek Bridge	March 28, 1995 (#95000258)	WA 503 over Jim Cr. 45°59′45″N 122°30′55″W	Woodland	Bridges of Washington State MPS
7	Hulda Klager Lilac Gardens	Hulda Klager Lilac Gardens	July 17, 1975 (#75001847)	115 S. Pekin Rd. 45°53′51″N 122°45′07″W	Woodland	
8	Lake Sacajawea Park	Lake Sacajawea Park	December 5, 1985 (#85003011)	Bounded by Nichols and Kessler Blvds. 46°08′14″N 122°56′46″W	Longview	Civic, Cultural, and Commercial Resources of Longview Thematic Resource MPS
9	Laughlin Round Barn	Laughlin Round Barn	May 15, 1986 (#86001080)	8249 Barnes Dr. 46°20′25″N 122°55′24″W	Castle Rock	Laughlin Round Bridge near Castle Rock.
10	Lawetlat'la	Lawetlat'la	September 11, 2013 (#13000748)	Gifford Pinchot National Forest; 46°12′49″N 122°14′39″W	Cougar	Cowlitz people name for Mount St. Helens
11	Robert Alexander Long High School	Robert Alexander Long High School	December 5, 1985 (#85003010)	2903 Nichols Blvd. 46°08′27″N 122°57′15″W	Longview	Built in 1927, this is the oldest high school in Longview. Civic, Cultural, and Commercial Resources of Longview Thematic Resource MPS
12	Longview Bridge	Longview Bridge	July 16, 1982 (#82004208)	Spans Columbia river 46°06′48″N 122°57′10″W	Longview	Better known as the Lewis and Clark Bridge. Historic Bridges and Tunnels in Washington TR
13	Longview Civic Center Historic District	Longview Civic Center Historic District	December 5, 1985 (#85003012)	Bounded by Maple St., Sixteenth Ave., Hemlock St., and Eighteenth Ave. 46°08′23″N 122°56′16″W	Longview	Civic, Cultural, and Commercial Resources of Longview Thematic Resource MPS
14	Longview Community Church	Longview Community Church	December 5, 1985 (#85003016)	2323 Washington Way; 46°08′03″N 122°56′55″W	Longview	Civic, Cultural, and Commercial Resources of Longview Thematic Resource MPS
15	Longview Community Church-Saint Helen's Addition	Longview Community Church-Saint Helen's Addition	December 5, 1985 (#85003017)	416 Twentieth Ave. 46°07′28″N 122°57′32″W	Longview	Civic, Cultural, and Commercial Resources of Longview Thematic Resource MPS
16	Longview Community Store	Longview Community Store	December 5, 1985 (#85003027)	421 Twentieth Ave. 46°07′29″N 122°57′05″W	Longview	Civic, Cultural, and Commercial Resources of Longview Thematic Resource MPS
17	Longview Women's Clubhouse	Longview Women's Clubhouse	December 5, 1985 (#85003018)	835 Twenty-first Ave. 46°07′55″N 122°56′52″W	Longview	Civic, Cultural, and Commercial Resources of Longview Thematic Resource MPS
18	Mills Building	Mills Building	December 5, 1985 (#85003019)	1239 Commerce Ave. 46°08′11″N 122°56′00″W	Longview	Civic, Cultural, and Commercial Resources of Longview Thematic Resource MPS
19	Nutty Narrows Bridge	Nutty Narrows Bridge	August 18, 2014 (#14000500)	Spanning Olympia Way between 18th Avenue and Maple Street; 46°08′29″N 122°56′26″W	Longview	
20	Pacific Telephone and Telegraph Building	Pacific Telephone and Telegraph Building	December 5, 1985 (#85003020)	1304 Vandercook Way; 46°08′27″N 122°55′57″W	Longview	Civic, Cultural, and Commercial Resources of Longview Thematic Resource MPS
21	Pounder Building	Pounder Building	December 5, 1985 (#85003021)	1208 Commerce Ave. 46°08′10″N 122°56′01″W	Longview	Civic, Cultural, and Commercial Resources of Longview Thematic Resource MPS
22	Schumann Building	Schumann Building	December 5, 1985 (#85003022)	1233 Commerce Ave. 46°08′11″N 122°55′58″W	Longview	Civic, Cultural, and Commercial Resources of Longview Thematic Resource MPS
23	Sevier and Weed Building	Sevier and Weed Building	December 5, 1985 (#85003023)	1266 Twelfth Ave. 46°08′12″N 122°55′53″W	Longview	Civic, Cultural, and Commercial Resources of Longview Thematic Resource MPS
24	Nat Smith House	Nat Smith House	March 3, 1975 (#75001846)	110 W. Grant St. 46°08′48″N 122°54′56″W	Kelso	
25	Stella Blacksmith Shop	Stella Blacksmith Shop	December 19, 1985 (#85003204)	8530 Ocean Beach Hwy. 46°11′30″N 123°07′13″W	Stella	
26	J. D. Tennant House	J. D. Tennant House	April 12, 1984 (#84003461)	420 Rutherglen Rd. 46°09′06″N 122°59′30″W	Longview	
27	Tyni Building	Tyni Building	December 5, 1985 (#85003024)	1166 Commerce Ave. 46°08′05″N 122°56′02″W	Longview	Civic, Cultural, and Commercial Resources of Longview Thematic Resource MPS
28	U.S. Post Office – Kelso Main	U.S. Post Office – Kelso Main	August 7, 1991 (#91000646)	304 Academy St. 46°08′44″N 122°54′31″W	Kelso	
29	U.S. Post Office – Longview Main	U.S. Post Office – Longview Main	May 30, 1991 (#91000647)	1603 Larch St. 46°08′17″N 122°56′16″W	Longview	Civic, Cultural, and Commercial Resources of Longview Thematic Resource MPS
30	Washington Gas and Electric Building	Washington Gas and Electric Building	December 5, 1985 (#85003025)	1346 Fourteenth Ave. 46°08′18″N 122°56′01″W	Longview	Fourteenth Ave., corner of Broadway: current address 1333 Broadway. Civic, Cultural, and Commercial Resources of Longview Thematic Resource MPS
31	Willard Building	Willard Building	December 5, 1985 (#85003026)	1403 Twelfth Ave. 46°08′19″N 122°55′53″W	Longview	Civic, Cultural, and Commercial Resources of Longview Thematic Resource MPS
32	Yale Bridge	Yale Bridge	July 16, 1982 (#82004206)	Spanning the Lewis River on State Route 503; 45°57′40″N 122°22′18″W	Yale	Extends into Clark County

== See also ==
- National Register of Historic Places listings in Washington state
- Listings in neighboring counties: Clark, Columbia, Lewis, Skamania, Wahkiakum
- Historic preservation
- History of Washington (state)
- Index of Washington (state)-related articles
