= R. A. Long High School =

Robert A. Long High School
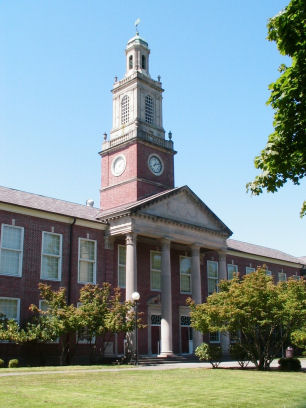

Location
- 2903 Nichols Blvd; Longview, Washington 98632; United States; 46.141°N 122.956°W

Information
- Type: Public
- Established: 1927
- School district: Longview Public Schools
- Principal: Richard Reeves
- Teaching staff: 43.74 (FTE)
- Grades: 9–12
- Enrollment: 897 (2023–2024)
- Student to teacher ratio: 20.51
- Colors: Black and red
- Athletics conference: Greater St. Helens 2A
- Mascot: Lumberjacks and Lumberjills
- Rival: Mark Morris High School
- WIAA Class: 2A
- Website: ralong.longviewschools.com
- Robert Alexander Long High School
- U.S. National Register of Historic Places
- Built: 1927
- MPS: Civic, Cultural, and Commercial Resources of Longview Thematic Resource
- NRHP reference No.: 85003010
- Added to NRHP: September 3, 1991

R. A. Long High School is the oldest high school serving the city of Longview, Washington. A part of Longview Public Schools, it was erected in 1927, three years after the city of Longview was incorporated. The total student enrollment at the end of the 2015–2016 school year was 890. The school is named for the city's founder, Robert A. Long, a wealthy timber baron from Missouri. Their mascot, the Lumberjack, was so named due to the area's reliance on the timber industry. The female students and sports teams are referred to as "Lumberjills". The school is on the city Historical Register, with the following inscription:

"This school, a gift to the City of Longview by Robert A. Long, was designed by William B. Ittner. The two-story Corinthian columns and clock tower dominate the Georgian Revival style. The 900-seat auditorium serves as an educational and cultural center. The building and grounds are listed on the National Register of Historic Places."

== Student body and curriculum ==
Every senior at R. A. Long is required to complete senior oral presentation. Seniors must have a minimum of 24 hours of community service and at least 12 service to school points in order to graduate.

Many classes and programs in the Longview school district are shared between both R. A. Long and Mark Morris High School, such as the Dana Brown Mainstage Theatre program, higher level math, science, language classes, the orchestra, and shop classes.

== Lumberjack sports ==
R. A. Long High School currently competes in the Washington Interscholastic Activities Association (WIAA) Greater St. Helens 2A league. The football team shares the Longview Memorial Stadium with cross-town rival Mark Morris High School. Longview Memorial Stadium was renovated during the Summer of 2023, and the track and grass field were replaced with a turf field and new track. The basketball team competes in the R. A. Long Gymnasium, playing in two "Civil War" games versus Mark Morris each year. One is held at the R. A. Long Lumberdome and the other on Mark Morris's Ted M. Natt Court. The football team also plays at least one game a year against Mark Morris, also called the Civil War.

=== State championships ===
- Boys Swimming: 1939
- Girls Basketball: 1981
- Softball: 1996
- Volleyball: 1983, 1984, 1985, 1990
- Girls Bowling: 2024, 2026

=== State runners-up ===
- Boys Swimming: 1950
- Boys Baseball: 2010
- Softball: 1993, 2013
- Volleyball: 1982, 1988
- Girls Bowling: 2025
- Boys Basketball: 2026

== Notable alumni ==
- Jim Caple, sports reporter with ESPN and contributor to Page2, 1980
- Loren L. Coleman, science fiction author, 1986
- Steve De Jarnatt, director of cult films Miracle Mile and Cherry 2000
- Cole Escola, comedian and actor, 2005
- Bob Gambold, Former professional football player and coach
- Sharry Konopski, Playboy centerfold, 1986
- David Korten, author of When Corporations Rule the World (ISBN 1887208046), 1955
- Jeff Pilson, current Foreigner bass player, formerly of Dokken and Dio, 1976
- Kent R. Weeks - Egyptologist
