= Longview Women's Clubhouse =

Historic women's clubhouse in Washington

- U.S. National Register of Historic Places
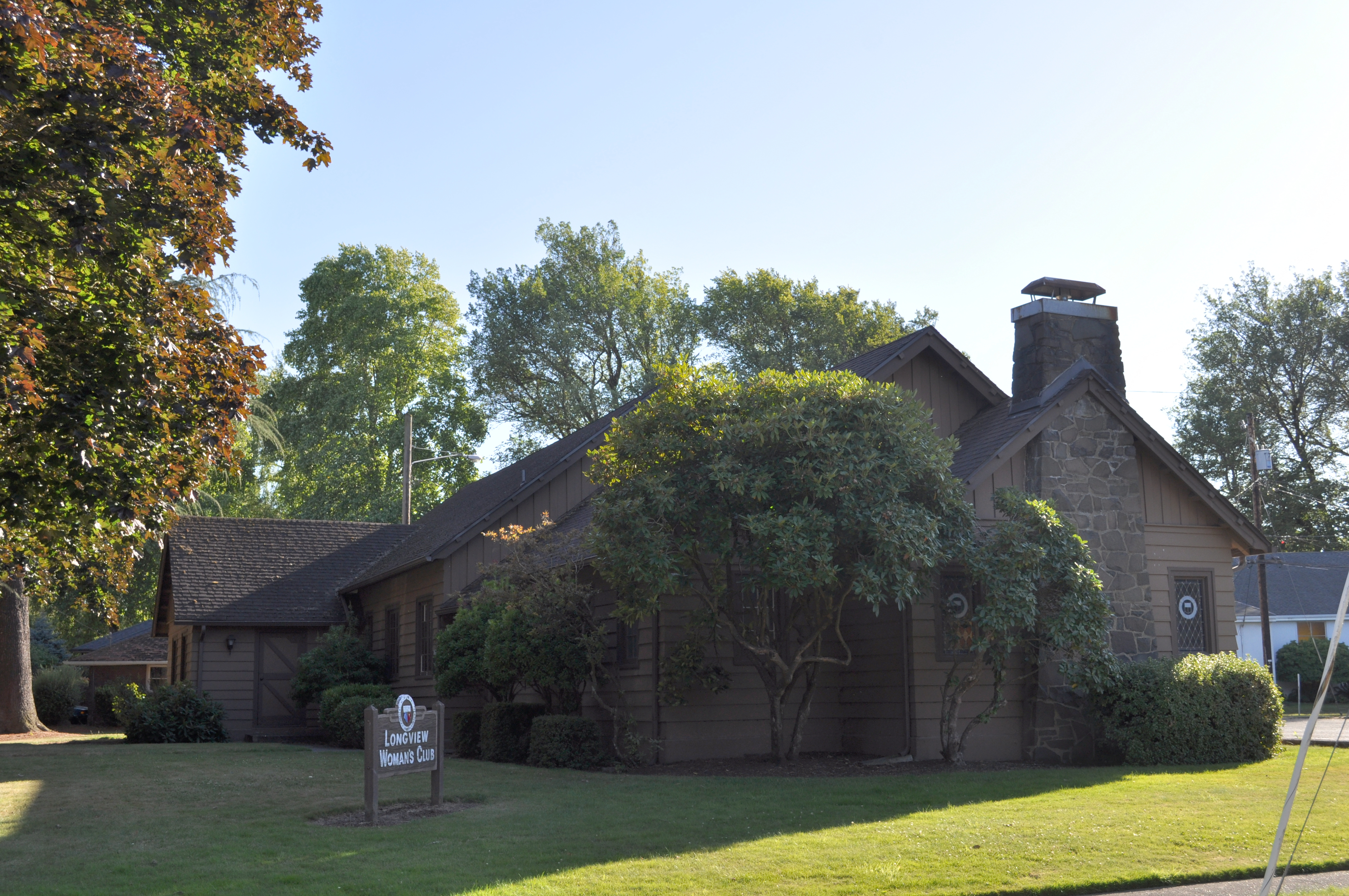
- The clubhouse from Delaware Street

- Location within Washington (state) Location within the United States
- Location: 834 21st Avenue, Longview, Washington 98632
- Coordinates: 46°07′55″N 122°56′52″W
- Built: 1935
- Built by: Works Progress Administration
- Architect: George MacPherson
- Architectural style: Rustic, Carpenter Gothic
- MPS: Civic, Cultural, and Commercial Resources of Longview Thematic Resource
- NRHP reference No.: 85003018
- Added to NRHP: December 5, 1985

The Longview Women's Clubhouse is a historic building in Longview, Washington. The building was completed in 1935 and was listed on the National Register of Historic Places in 1985 as part of a Multiple Property Submission.

== History ==
The Community Service Club was established in 1923, at the same time that the company town of Longview was being established. Originally the organization met in one of the dormitories built by the Long-Bell Lumber Company. The group was renamed and, in 1929, joined the National Federation of Women's Clubs.

During the Great Depression, the group constructed the clubhouse from corporate, individual, and government donations. The prime lots near Lake Sacajawea were donated by Long-Bell while the wood was donated by the Weyerhaeuser Timber Company, which had by then also opened a mill in Longview. The construction labor was provided from the Works Progress Administration, which completed the building in 1935.

Initially the women's club had a social welfare focus on supporting with new arrivals for Long-Bell, but it gradually became more of a social and philanthropic organization. The building was increasingly used for meetings of various non-profit organizations, blood drives, church services, and wedding receptions.

The clubhouse is now owned by the City of Longview and civic and political events are held in the building. Beginning in 2022, the building has been used for summer camps.

== Architecture ==
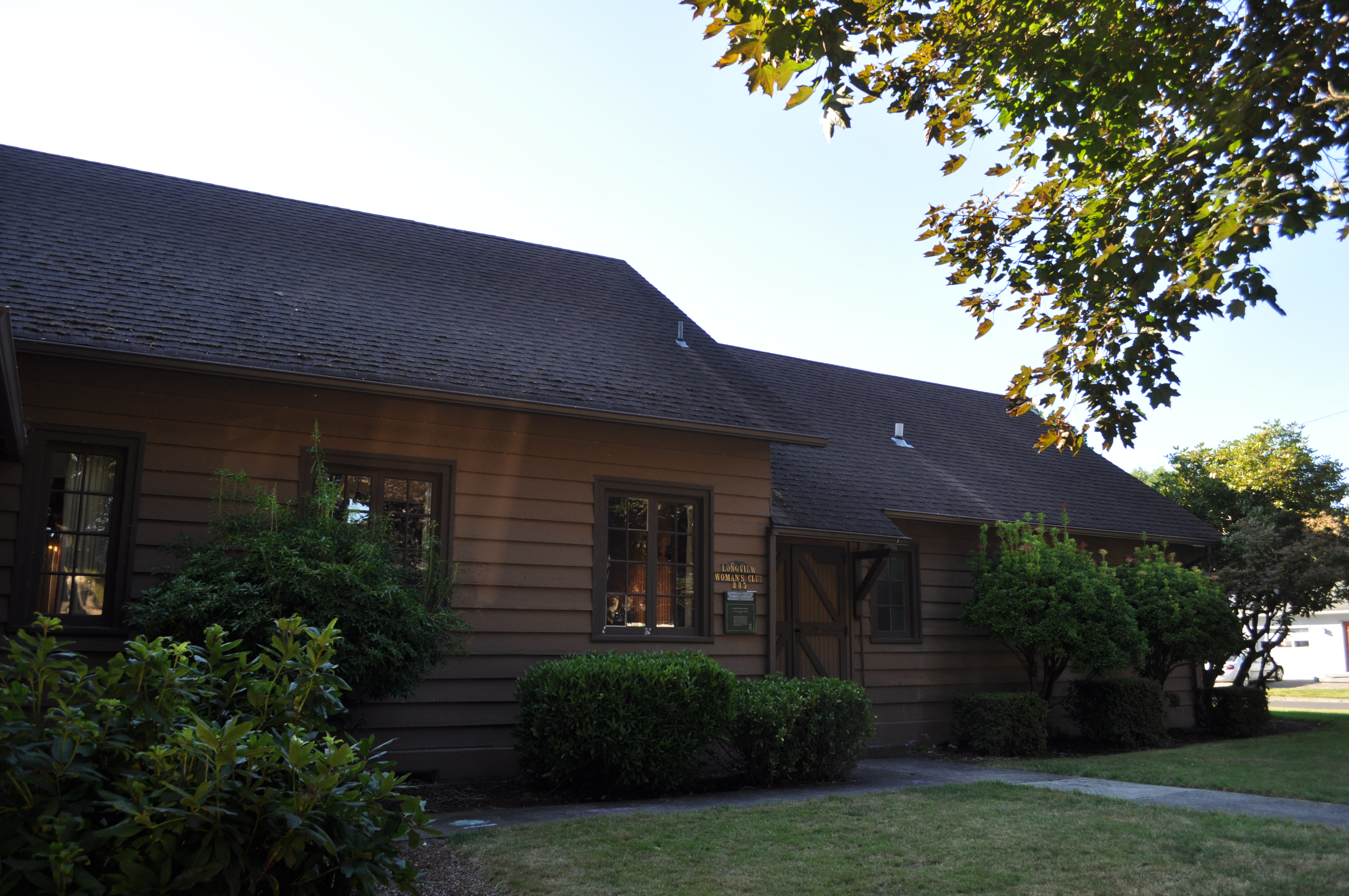
The clubhouse from 21st Avenue

Local architect George MacPherson designed the clubhouse in a rustic and carpenter Gothic architectural style. The exterior has rough sawn weather boarding and projecting purlin ends. The roof has stepping gables and a rubble chimney. The interior has a trussed great meeting room with ancillary wing stepping down to the rear with a kitchen.

== See also ==
- List of women's clubs
- National Register of Historic Places listings in Cowlitz County, Washington
