= Bud Black =

American baseball player and manager (born 1957)

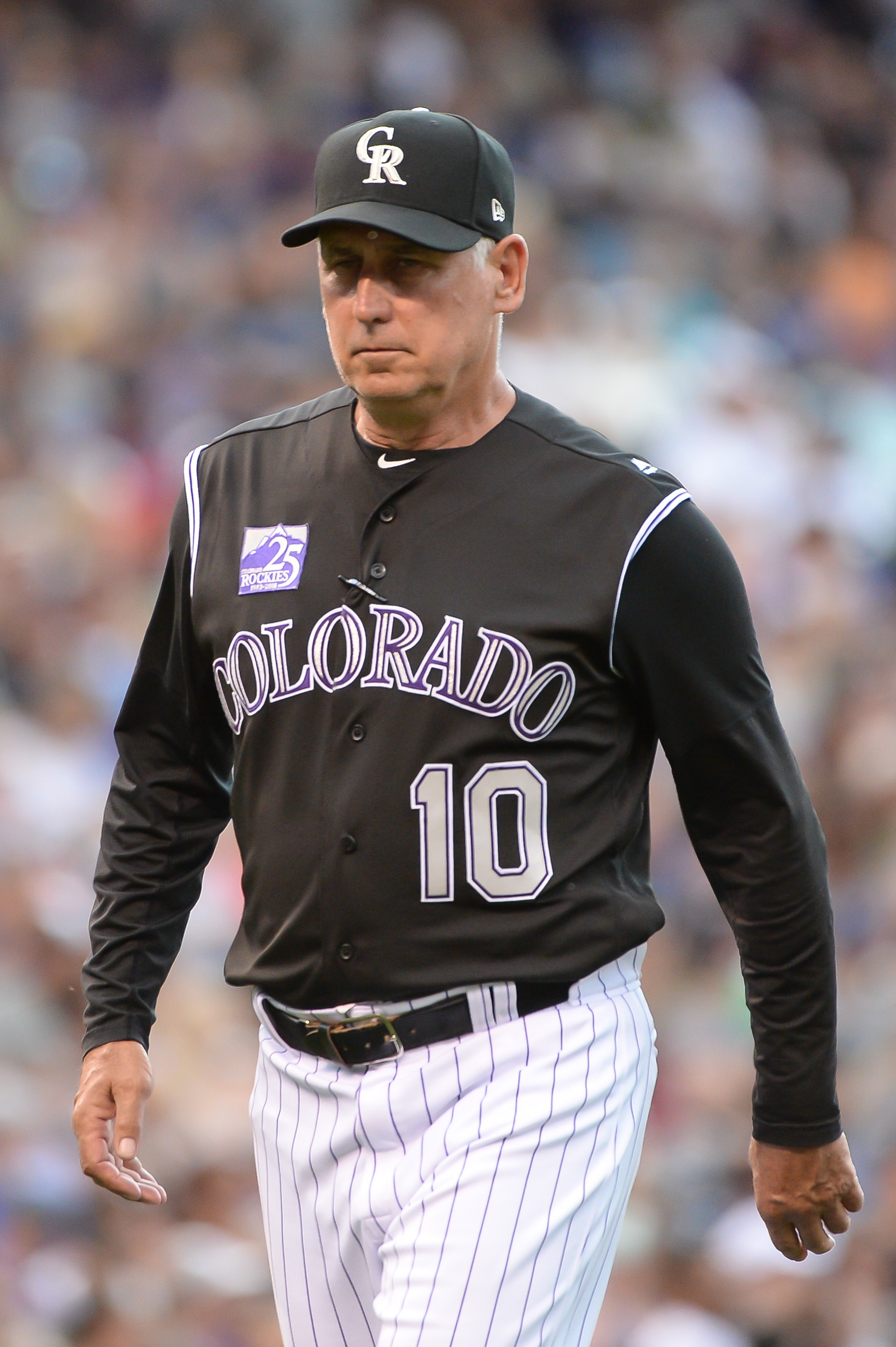
- Black with the Colorado Rockies in 2018
- Pitcher / Manager
- Born: June 30, 1957 (age 69); San Mateo, California, U.S.
- Batted: Left Threw: Left

MLB debut
- September 5, 1981, for the Seattle Mariners

Last MLB appearance
- July 9, 1995, for the Cleveland Indians

MLB statistics
- Win–loss record: 121–116
- Earned run average: 3.84
- Strikeouts: 1,039
- Managerial record: 1,193–1,403
- Winning %: .460
- Stats at Baseball Reference
- Managerial record at Baseball Reference

Teams
- As player: Seattle Mariners (1981); Kansas City Royals (1982–1988); Cleveland Indians (1988–1990); Toronto Blue Jays (1990); San Francisco Giants (1991–1994); Cleveland Indians (1995); As manager: San Diego Padres (2007–2015); Colorado Rockies (2017–2025); As coach: Anaheim Angels / Los Angeles Angels of Anaheim (2000–2006)

Career highlights and awards
- 2× World Series champion (1985, 2002); NL Manager of the Year (2010)

Harry Ralston "Bud" Black (born June 30, 1957) is an American professional baseball manager and pitcher who most recently served as manager for the Colorado Rockies of Major League Baseball (MLB). He played in MLB from 1981 through 1995, most notably for the Kansas City Royals and Cleveland Indians. He coached the Anaheim Angels / Los Angeles Angels of Anaheim from 2000 through 2006 and managed the San Diego Padres from 2007 through 2015. He was named the National League Manager of the Year in 2010.

== Early life ==
Black graduated from Mark Morris High School in Longview, Washington. He initially pitched collegiately for Lower Columbia College. The San Francisco Giants selected him in the third round of the January 1977 amateur draft and the New York Mets selected him in the second round of the June 1977 MLB draft, but he did not sign with either team. He then attended San Diego State University, pitching for the Aztecs in 1978 and 1979. He graduated in 1979 with a bachelor's degree in management. He was inducted into the Aztecs Hall of Fame in 1992.

== Professional career ==
=== Seattle Mariners ===
The Seattle Mariners selected Black in the 17th round of 1979 Major League Baseball draft, with the 417th overall pick. The Mariners assigned him to the San Jose Missions of the Class A-Advanced California League, where he pitched in 17 games, mostly in relief, and posted a 3.00 ERA. He spent the entire 1980 season with San Jose, posting a 5–3 won-lost record with a 3.45 ERA in 32 appearances. In 1981, Black spent time with the Triple-A Spokane Indians and Double-A Lynn Sailors, posting a 3–6 record and 3.13 ERA in 11 starts and 26 total appearances.

Black made his major league debut with the Mariners on September 5, 1981, in a relief appearance where he faced only one batter (Rick Miller of the Boston Red Sox) and gave up a hit. He only made one more appearance that season, the following day where he pitched 1 inning, gave up 1 hit, and issued 3 walks.

=== Kansas City Royals ===
In March 1982, the Mariners traded Black to the Kansas City Royals in exchange for Manny Castillo. At the time of the trade, Royals general manager John Schuerholz said the team intended to use Black out of the bullpen. He began the 1982 season in the major leagues, primarily as a reliever. On April 18, Black made his first major league start, lasting 5 2/3 innings but giving up 9 hits, 7 runs, and 4 walks to the Cleveland Indians. He was optioned in May to the Triple-A Omaha Royals, where he posted a 3–1 record with a 2.49 ERA in 4 starts. The Royals recalled Black to the major leagues in June, adding him to the starting rotation. In his first start back, he pitched 7 innings and held the Minnesota Twins to 5 hits and 1 earned run, striking out 2 and walking 2. In his rookie season, Black had a 4–6 record with a 4.58 ERA across 88 1/3 innings.

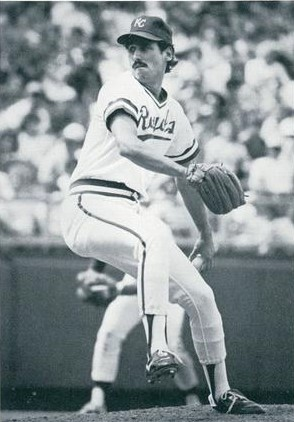
Black with the Royals in 1982

In 1983, Black began the season with Triple-A Omaha. He was called up in late May and made his season debut on May 25 against the Texas Rangers, lasting 7 2/3 innings and giving up 2 earned runs. On July 24 against the New York Yankees, Black pitched the first 6 innings of what would ultimately become the Pine Tar Incident, an incident where George Brett's go-ahead home run was overturned to become a game-ending out because the umpires decided there was too much pine tar on Brett's bat. Black received a no-decision instead of a loss because the game was protested, causing the league to reinstate Brett's go-ahead home run. On August 4 and 9, Black threw back-to-back complete games, both against the Milwaukee Brewers. For the season, Black had a 10–7 record, 161 1/3 innings pitched, and a 3.79 ERA.

In 1984, Black was the Royals' Opening Day starter, starting the season with a 7-inning, 2-run outing against the Yankees. On May 23, Black threw the first shutout of his career, blanking the Chicago White Sox as the Royals scored an unearned run to win 1–0. Black threw 8 complete games that season. On September 17, Reggie Jackson hit his 500th career home run off of Black. Black had a 17–12 record, 3.12 ERA and AL-leading 1.128 walks plus hits per innings pitched (WHIP) in 257 innings pitched. Black started Game 1 of the American League Championship Series (ALCS), but he surrendered 7 hits and 4 earned runs across 5 innings as his team was swept by the Detroit Tigers in 3 games.

In 1985, Black was the Royals' Opening Day starter for the second consecutive season. He pitched 7 2/3 innings against the Toronto Blue Jays, giving up 4 hits and 1 earned run. He threw 5 complete games that year, 2 of which were shutouts. He finished the regular season with a 10–15 record, 205 2/3 innings pitched, and a 4.33 ERA. In the postseason, Black was both a starting pitcher and relief pitcher. He started Game 2 of the American League Championship Series, lasting 7 innings while giving up 5 hits and 3 runs (2 earned). He was used for 1/3 of an inning in Game 3 of the series on one day of rest. In Game 6, Black deployed as a long reliever, holding the Blue Jays scoreless through 3 1/3 innings and earning the hold. In Game 1 of the World Series, Black got the final out of the 9th inning after walking two batters. In Game 4, he started and went 5 innings against the Cardinals but gave up 4 hits, 3 earned runs, and took the loss.

1986 started as planned for Black — he was once again the Opening Day starter, but he struggled against the New York Yankees with 6 hits and 4 earned runs surrendered across 7 innings. Through his first 3 starts, Black posted a 6.43 ERA, prompting the Royals to move him to the bullpen. He made his first relief appearance in years on April 22, pitching 2/3 of an inning against the Yankees and giving up one hit. Black's performance improved as a member of the bullpen, ultimately posting a 4–8 record, collecting 9 saves and 6 holds while posting a 2.78 ERA in his 107 innings of relief appearances.

Black split the 1987 season between the rotation and bullpen, intermittently moving between starting and relieving. He opened the season as a reliever, not giving up an earned run through his first 5 appearances but blowing a save with 2 earned runs on April 29. In May, Black returned to the starting rotation. He primarily remained as a starter throughout the season, making three relief appearances in September but starting in his final appearance of the year. He finished the year with an 8–6 record, 1 save, 122 1/3 innings pitched, and a 3.60 ERA.

Black opened the 1988 season with the Royals, only working as a reliever. He made 17 appearances and pitched 22 innings, posting a 2–1 record and a 4.91 ERA.

=== Cleveland Indians ===
On June 3, 1988, the Royals traded Black to the Cleveland Indians for Pat Tabler. The Indians went the same direction as the Royals, initially using Black as a relief pitcher. He made his Indians debut on June 5, collecting 1 strikeout against the Detroit Tigers. In July, the Indians converted Black back to a starting pitcher. His stint in the rotation that year lasted 7 games, a stretch where he threw 37 innings, posting a 1–2 record with a 4.86 ERA. In late September, Cleveland moved Black to the bullpen once again for his final two appearances of the season.

After the 1988 season, Black became a free agent but re-signed with the Indians a month later. In 1989, he experienced a revival in his pitching career, being named as the Indians #2 starter behind Greg Swindell. He made his season debut on April 6 against the Milwaukee Brewers, pitching 7 2/3 innings while giving up 8 hits and 2 earned runs. In 1989, Black pitched 6 complete games, 3 of which were shutouts. He finished the year with a 12–11 record, 222 1/3 innings pitched, and a 3.36 ERA.

In 1990, Black was Cleveland's Opening Day starter, going 5 innings with 6 hits and 3 earned runs surrendered against the New York Yankees. He remained the team's ace for most of the year, starting 29 games where posted an 11–10 record with 191 innings pitched and a 3.53 ERA. He threw 5 complete games in that stretch, 2 of which were shutouts.

=== Toronto Blue Jays ===
On September 16, 1990, the Indians traded Black to the Toronto Blue Jays for Mauro Gozzo and two players to be named later (Steve Cummings and Alex Sanchez). He made his final 3 appearances of the 1990 season with Toronto, including 1 relief appearance and 2 starts. Following the season, he was granted free agency.

=== San Francisco Giants ===
On November 9, 1990, Black signed a four-year, $10 million contract with the San Francisco Giants. In the 1991 season, he was placed second in the starting rotation behind John Burkett. He made his Giants debut on April 10, going 7 innings against the San Diego Padres, giving up 4 hits, 4 runs, and striking out 10. He threw 3 shutouts in 1991, including back-to-back shutouts on May 5 and 10, both times against the New York Mets. He finished the season with a 12–16 record, 214 1/3 innings pitched, and a 3.99 ERA.

Black spent the first month of the 1992 season sidelined due to a back sprain he suffered during spring training. He made his season debut on May 9 against the Montreal Expos, surrendering 7 hits and 8 runs (7 earned) through 4 2/3 innings. He threw 2 complete games, one of which was a shutout. He finished with a 10–12 record, 177 innings pitched, and a 3.97 ERA.

In 1993, following an August 3 game against the San Diego Padres, Black suffered elbow inflammation that ended his season due to a 60-day disabled list placement. He finished with an 8–2 record, 93 2/3 innings pitched, and a 3.56 ERA.

In 1994, Black pitched a limited number of games due to the 1994–95 Major League Baseball strike that ended the season in August. He went 4–2 with 54 1/3 innings pitched and a 4.47 ERA. Following the season, Black became a free agent.

=== Cleveland Indians (second stint) ===
On April 7, 1995, Black signed a minor-league contract with the Cleveland Indians, marking his second stint with the organization. He was later signed to a major-league deal on April 25. He struggled through 10 starts and 1 relief appearance with the team, posting a 4–2 record in 47 1/3 innings pitched with a 6.85 ERA. The Indians released Black on July 14.

Following his release from the Indians, several organizations contacted Black about joining their team, but he was only interested in pitching in San Francisco or Cleveland. As a result, he retired as a player in August 1995 and was hired as a special assistant in the Indians organization. His final career stats were a 121–116 record, 2053 1/3 innings pitched, 398 games (296 started), a 3.84 ERA, a 1.267 WHIP, 1,039 strikeouts, 12 shutouts, and 11 saves.

=== Winter ball ===
Between MLB seasons, Black pitched for the Leones del Caracas of the Venezuela Winter League and was a member of the 1982 Caribbean Series champion team.

== Coaching and managerial career ==
=== Cleveland Indians organization ===
In 1998, Black was the pitching coach for the Buffalo Bisons, Cleveland's Triple-A affiliate. When Charlie Manuel was tapped to manage the Indians for the 2000 season, Black was considered a finalist for the team's pitching coach position, but Dick Pole was hired instead.

=== Anaheim/Los Angeles Angels ===
On November 23, 1999, Anaheim Angels manager Mike Scioscia hired Black to be the team's pitching coach, joining a group of new assistant coaching hires that also included Joe Maddon, Alfredo Griffin, Ron Roenicke, and Mickey Hatcher. Black took over an Angels starting rotation that was considered subpar by the media in the previous season. He worked with young pitchers like Jarrod Washburn, Ramón Ortiz, and Scott Schoeneweis.

Under Black's direction in 2002, Angels pitchers combined for a 3.69 ERA and a .247 batting average against (BAA), both good for fourth-best in the league. In October 2002, as the Angels were preparing for the 2002 World Series, the Cleveland Indians inquired about Black becoming the team's next manager after the firing of Charlie Manuel. Black declined the job offer and Eric Wedge was hired instead. Black and the Angels took on the Giants in the World Series, a team led by Dusty Baker, the manager of the 1993 and 1994 Giants teams that Black pitched for. Following the Angels' defeat of the Giants and the subsequent release of Baker, Black was named as a potential candidate for the San Francisco managerial job.

On October 24, 2003, the Angels gave Black a one-year contract extension to remain with the team through the 2004 season. In November 2003, Black was interviewed by the Boston Red Sox for the team's managerial opening, but the job went to Terry Francona and Black remained with the Angels.

Black coached Bartolo Colón in 2005 during his AL Cy Young-winning season.

=== San Diego Padres ===
In October 2006, Brian Sabean, general manager of the Giants, interviewed Black for the Giants' vacant managerial position. After the position went to Padres manager Bruce Bochy, Black became a candidate for the Padres job, and was officially hired on November 8, 2006. Despite a last-place finish for the Padres in 2008, Black returned to finish his contract in 2009. During the 2009 season, Black was given a contract extension for the 2010 season with a club option for 2011. During the 2010 season, the Padres gave Black another three-year extension through 2013, with club options in 2014 and 2015. In 2010, Black presided over the worst collapse in Padres history when they went on a ten-game losing streak with a little over a month left in the season, went 12–16 in September and squandered a 6 1/2-game lead over the Giants for the NL West title. Black nonetheless was the winner of the 2010 National League Manager of the Year Award, edging Dusty Baker of the Cincinnati Reds in voting by a single point. Black is only the third former full-time pitcher to win a Manager of the Year Award, joining Tommy Lasorda and Larry Dierker.

On June 15, 2015, Black was fired after eight-plus seasons with the Padres after the team started 2015 at 32–33 and was six games behind in the National League West. He finished with a record of 649 wins and 713 losses.

On October 28, 2015, The Washington Post reported that the Washington Nationals intended to hire Black as their new manager following the 2015 World Series, replacing fired manager Matt Williams. However, it was later reported that he would not be getting the job. Black turned down the Nationals offer, which he considered to be too low.

=== Los Angeles Angels (second stint) ===
On November 25, 2015, it was announced that Black would be returning to the Los Angeles Angels to serve as a special assistant to the new general manager, Billy Eppler. Black previously served as a pitching coach for the team from 2000 to 2006.

=== Colorado Rockies ===
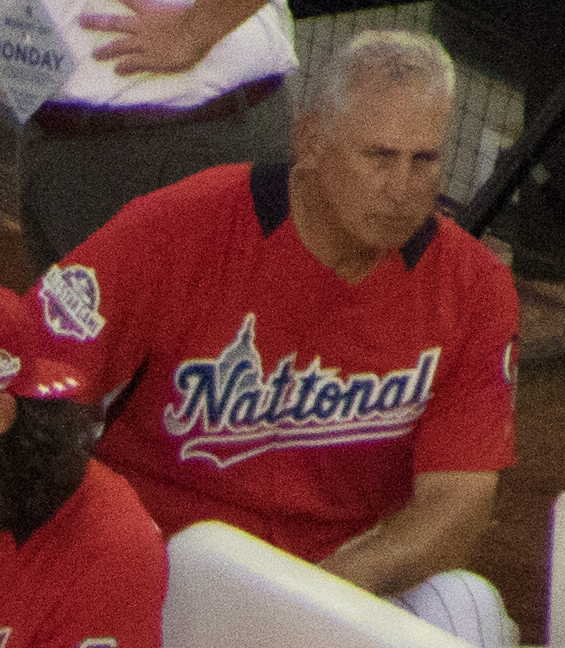
Black representing the Rockies at the 2018 Major League Baseball Home Run Derby

On November 7, 2016, the Colorado Rockies announced Black as its new manager. On April 3, 2017, Black won his Rockies debut, defeating the Milwaukee Brewers on Opening Day, notching his 650th win as a manager. Black led the Rockies to the playoffs in both 2017 and 2018, his first two seasons as Rockies manager.

On February 8, 2022, the Rockies extended Black through the 2023 season. On April 10, Black earned his 1,000th career win as a manager in a game against the Los Angeles Dodgers.

On February 15, 2023, Black signed a one-year contract extension that ran through the 2024 season. The Rockies finished the 2023 season with 103 losses, five more than the franchise's previous high of 98 in 2012. The Rockies also ended the season with 1,543 strikeouts, the most in franchise history as well as the lowest team batting average of .249 (which was just slightly lower than the 2021 team batting average).

In 2024, the Rockies suffered their second consecutive 100-loss season. On September 17, 2024, Black became the winningest manager in the franchise's 32–year history following an 8–2 victory over the Arizona Diamondbacks, passing the record set previously by Clint Hurdle.

On October 8, 2024, Black signed a one-year contract extension with the Rockies for the 2025 season. On May 11, 2025, after a 7–33 (.175) start to the season, the Rockies fired Black.

=== San Diego Padres (second stint) ===
On January 14, 2026, the San Diego Padres hired Black to serve as a senior advisor to baseball operations.

=== Managerial record ===
As of end of the 2025 season

Team	Year	Regular season					Postseason			
Team	Year	Games	Won	Lost	Win %	Finish	Won	Lost	Win %	Result
SD	2007	163	89	74	.546	3rd in NL West	-	–	–	
SD	2008	162	63	99	.389	5th in NL West	–	–	–	
SD	2009	162	75	87	.463	5th in NL West	–	–	–	
SD	2010	162	90	72	.556	2nd in NL West	–	–	–	
SD	2011	162	71	91	.438	5th in NL West	–	–	–	
SD	2012	162	76	86	.469	4th in NL West	–	–	–	
SD	2013	162	76	86	.469	3rd in NL West	–	–	–	
SD	2014	162	77	85	.475	3rd in NL West	–	–	–	
SD	2015	65	32	33	.492	Fired	–	–	–	
SD total		1,362	649	713	.477		-	-	–	
COL	2017	162	87	75	.537	3rd in NL West	0	1	.000	Lost NLWC (ARI)
COL	2018	163	91	72	.558	2nd in NL West	1	3	.250	Lost NLDS (MIL)
COL	2019	162	71	91	.438	4th in NL West	–	–	–	
COL	2020	60	26	34	.433	4th in NL West	–	–	–	
COL	2021	161	74	87	.460	4th in NL West	–	–	–	
COL	2022	162	68	94	.420	5th in NL West	–	–	–	
COL	2023	162	59	103	.364	5th in NL West	–	–	–	
COL	2024	162	61	101	.377	5th in NL West	-	-	-	
COL	2025	40	7	33	.175	Fired	-	-	-	
COL total		1,234	544	690	.441		1	4	.200	
Total		2,596	1,193	1,403	.460		1	4	.200	

== Personal life ==
Black was born to Canadian parents in Northern California. He and his wife, a pediatric ICU nurse, have two daughters.

== See also ==
- List of Colorado Rockies managers
- List of San Diego Padres managers

Sporting positions
Preceded by Dick Pole	Anaheim Angels Pitching Coach; 2000–2006	Succeeded by Mike Butcher
