= List of Colorado Rockies managers =

List of managers for the Major League Baseball franchise Colorado Rockies

The Colorado Rockies are members of Major League Baseball (MLB) and based in Denver, Colorado. The Rockies have had eight managers since their founding in 1993. The Rockies' first manager was Don Baylor, who led the team for six seasons and qualified for the playoffs once. Former manager Clint Hurdle led the Rockies to the playoffs in 2007, the only time the Rockies have won the National League pennant. The team was defeated in the World Series. As of 2025, Bud Black is the longest-tenured Rockies manager, leading the team from 2017-2025.

== Table key ==
WPct	Winning percentage: number of wins divided by number of games managed
PA	Playoff appearances: number of years this manager has led the franchise to the playoffs
PW	Playoff wins: number of wins this manager has accrued in the playoffs
PL	Playoff losses: number of losses this manager has accrued in the playoffs
WS	World Series: number of World Series victories achieved by the manager

== Managers ==
#	Image	Manager	Years	Games managed	Wins	Losses	W%	Postseason appearances	Postseason games managed	Postseason wins	Postseason losses	Postseason W%	World Series appearances	World Series titles	Ref
1		Don Baylor	1993–1998	909	440	469	.484	1	4	1	3	.250	0	0	
2		Jim Leyland	1999	162	72	90	.444	0	0	0	0	–	0	0	
3		Buddy Bell	2000–2002	346	161	185	.465	0	0	0	0	–	0	0	
4		Clint Hurdle	2002–2009	1,159	534	625	.461	1	11	7	4	.636	1 (2007)	0	
5		Jim Tracy	2009–2012	602	294	308	.488	1	4	1	3	.250	0	0	
6		Walt Weiss	2013–2016	648	283	365	.437	0	0	0	0	–	0	0	
7		Bud Black	2017–2025	1,234	537	657	.450	2	5	1	4	.200	0	0	
8		Warren Schaeffer	2025–present	263	90	173	.342	0	0	0	0	–	0	0	
Totals			1993–2026	5,323	2,418	2,905	.454	5	24	10	14	.417	1	0	

Statistics current through September 4, 2026.
