= Longview Public Schools =

School district in Washington, United States

Longview Public Schools is a school district headquartered in Longview, Washington.

== Schools ==
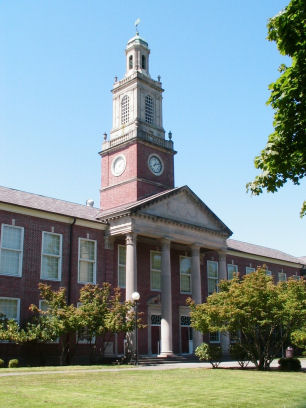
RA Long High School

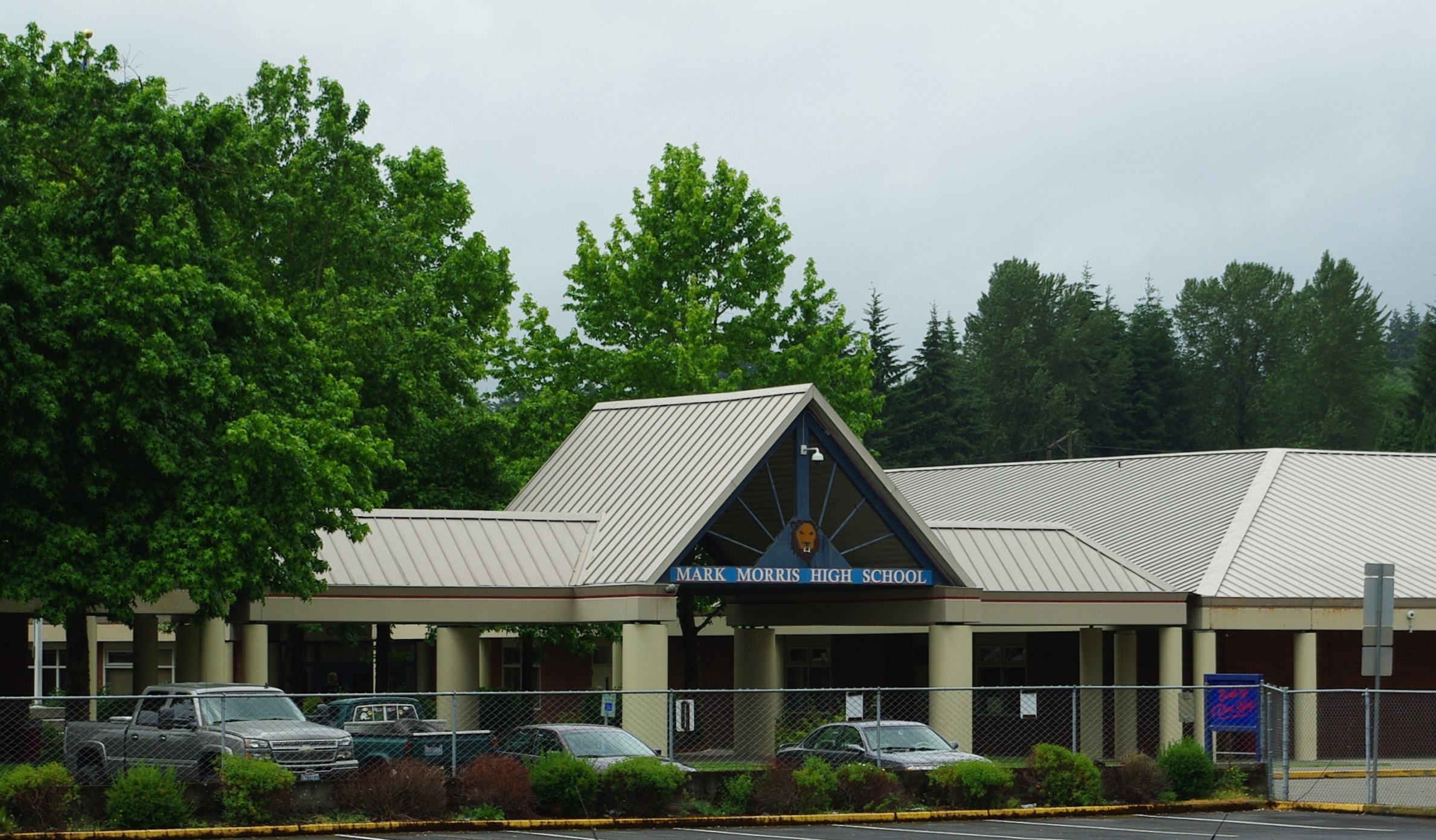
Mark Morris High School

High schools:

- RA Long High School
- Mark Morris High School
- Discovery High School

Middle schools:

- Cascade Middle School
- Monticello Middle School
- Mt. Solo Middle School

Elementary schools:

- Columbia Heights Elementary
- CVG Elementary
- Kessler Elementary
- Mint Valley Elementary
- Northlake Elementary
- Olympic Elementary
- Robert Gray Elementary
- St Helens Elementary

Other:

- Broadway Learning Center
