= Longview Community Church-Saint Helen's Addition =

Historic church in Washington, United States

- Longview Community Church--Saint Helen's Addition
- U.S. National Register of Historic Places
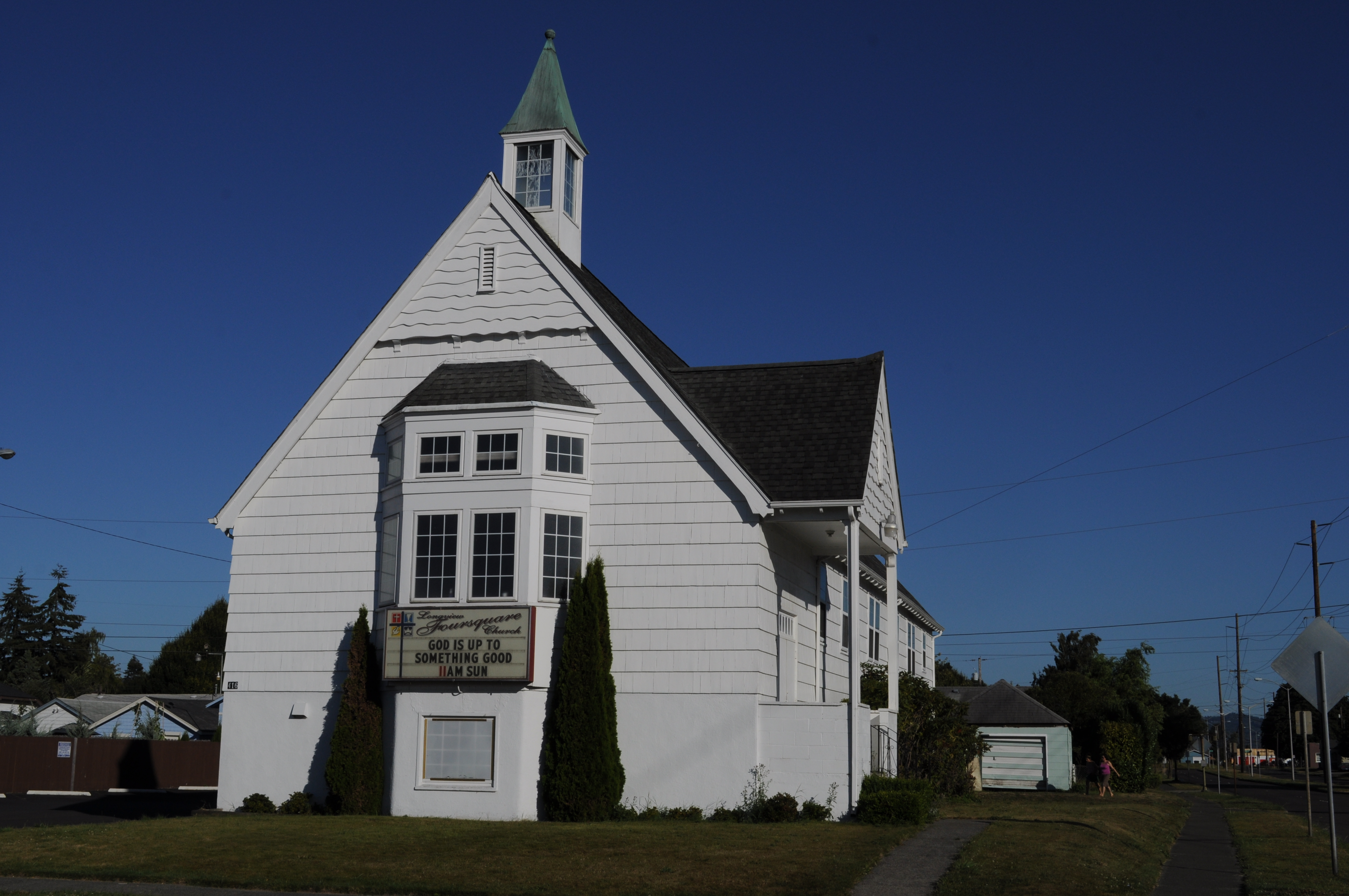

- Location within Washington (state) Location within the United States
- Location: 416 Twentieth Ave., Longview, Washington
- Coordinates: 46°7′28″N 122°57′32″W
- Area: less than one acre
- Built: 1929
- Architectural style: Classical Revival
- MPS: Civic, Cultural, and Commercial Resources of Longview TR
- NRHP reference No.: 85003017
- Added to NRHP: December 5, 1985

Longview Community Church—Saint Helen's Addition (also known as the Foursquare Gospel Church) is a historic church at 416 Twentieth Avenue in Longview, Washington.

It was built in 1929 and added to the National Register of Historic Places in 1985.
