= Nutty Narrows Bridge =

Bridge for squirrels in Longview, Washington, U.S.

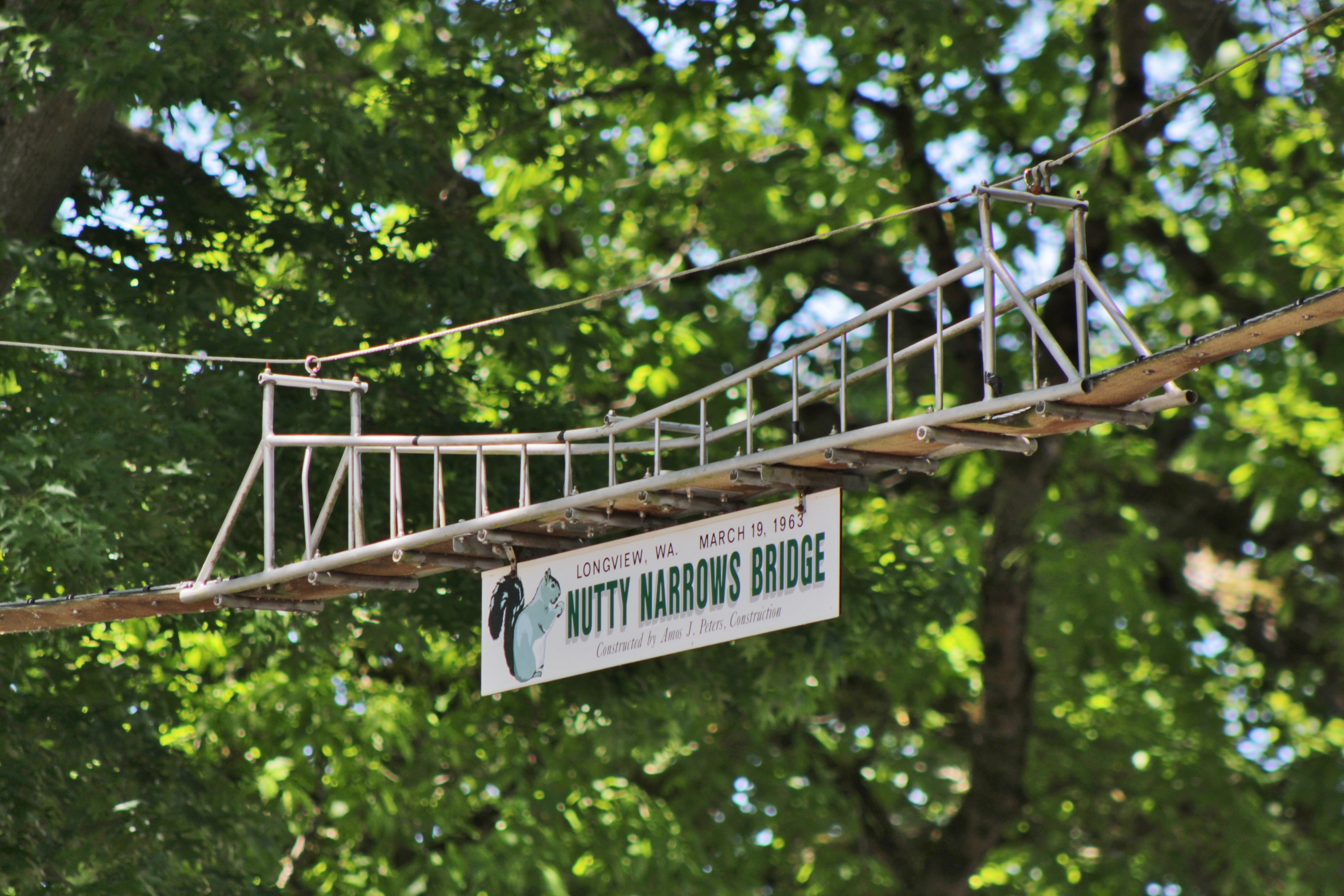
- Coordinates: 46°08′29″N 122°56′26″W
- Carries: Squirrels
- Crosses: Olympia Way
- Locale: Longview, Washington
- Owner: City of Longview

Characteristics
- Design: Catenary bridge in imitation of a suspension bridge
- Material: Canvas fire hose and aluminum
- Total length: 60 ft (18 m)

History
- Designer: Amos Peters, Robert Newhall, and LeRoy Dahl
- Constructed by: Amos Peters
- Construction end: 1963
- Opened: March 19, 1963
- Rebuilt: 1983, 1989, 1999, 2005, 2010
- Nutty Narrows Bridge
- U.S. National Register of Historic Places
- Location: Longview, Washington, spanning Olympia Way between 18th Avenue and Maple Street
- NRHP reference No.: 14000500
- Added to NRHP: August 18, 2014

Location
- Interactive map of Nutty Narrows Bridge

The Nutty Narrows Bridge is a squirrel bridge in Longview, Washington, United States. It spans Olympia Way near R. A. Long Park in downtown Longview, comprising a 60 feet (18 m) catenary bridge with a center section resembling a suspension bridge. The bridge was built by local contractor Amos Peters in 1963 and named by a city councilwoman, in a likely nod to the Tacoma Narrows Bridge.

The bridge was proposed after local tenants noticed that several squirrels had died while crossing the street in search of nuts. The proposal garnered national attention and was quickly approved by the city council. It was installed on March 19, 1963, and saw use by squirrels the following day. The bridge was removed for repairs and renovations several times in the late 20th century and remains a symbol of Longview.

The Nutty Narrows was moved from its original location in 2005 following the discovery of termite damage in the oak trees holding up its structure. Its new location, in the middle of a traffic circle, was determined to be a distraction to motorists and prompted a second move in 2010. The bridge inspired the construction of several other squirrel crossings in Longview and the original Nutty Narrows was added to the National Register of Historic Places in 2014.

== History ==
=== Conception and construction ===
Before the bridge was built, several squirrels were killed while crossing busy streets that separated large trees in R. A. Long Park from an area with plentiful nuts. Several tenants at a nearby office building proposed the construction of a dedicated bridge for squirrels as early as 1960 and received approval from the Longview City Council on February 28, 1963. The bridge was named the "Nutty Narrows" by councilwoman Bess LaRivere, likely as a reference to the Tacoma Narrows Bridge. The proposal brought international attention to Longview, as it was republished in newspapers, magazines, and reported on by radio stations.

The 60 ft-long (18 m) bridge was designed by local architects Robert Newhall and LeRoy Dahl, and structural engineer Donald Kramer. Contractor Amos Peters, who worked in a nearby office and was a member of the Sandbaggers civic fraternity, constructed the bridge using aluminum piping covered with a retired fire hose and designed it to resemble a small suspension bridge. It cost approximately $1,000 to assemble the bridge. The bridge was installed 18 ft (5.5 m) over Olympia Way near the Civic Center in downtown Longview on March 19, 1963, in front of city officials, 100 spectators, and television news crews. Despite several attempts to lure squirrels to use the bridge, including bait peanuts attached to the bridge, no squirrels appeared during the morning ceremony. The first squirrels were observed using the bridge the following morning by a local resident who reported that she was "bombarded" with peanut shells after walking under the structure.

The Nutty Narrows Bridge was planned to be formally dedicated on March 30, 1963, as part of a citywide parade and the Miss Longview beauty pageant, but the event was cancelled due to inclement weather. An abbreviated ceremony took place on March 31 with Washington State Patrol chief Roy Betlach cutting a miniature ribbon on the bridge after being hoisted into the air on a cherry picker.

=== Repairs and relocations ===
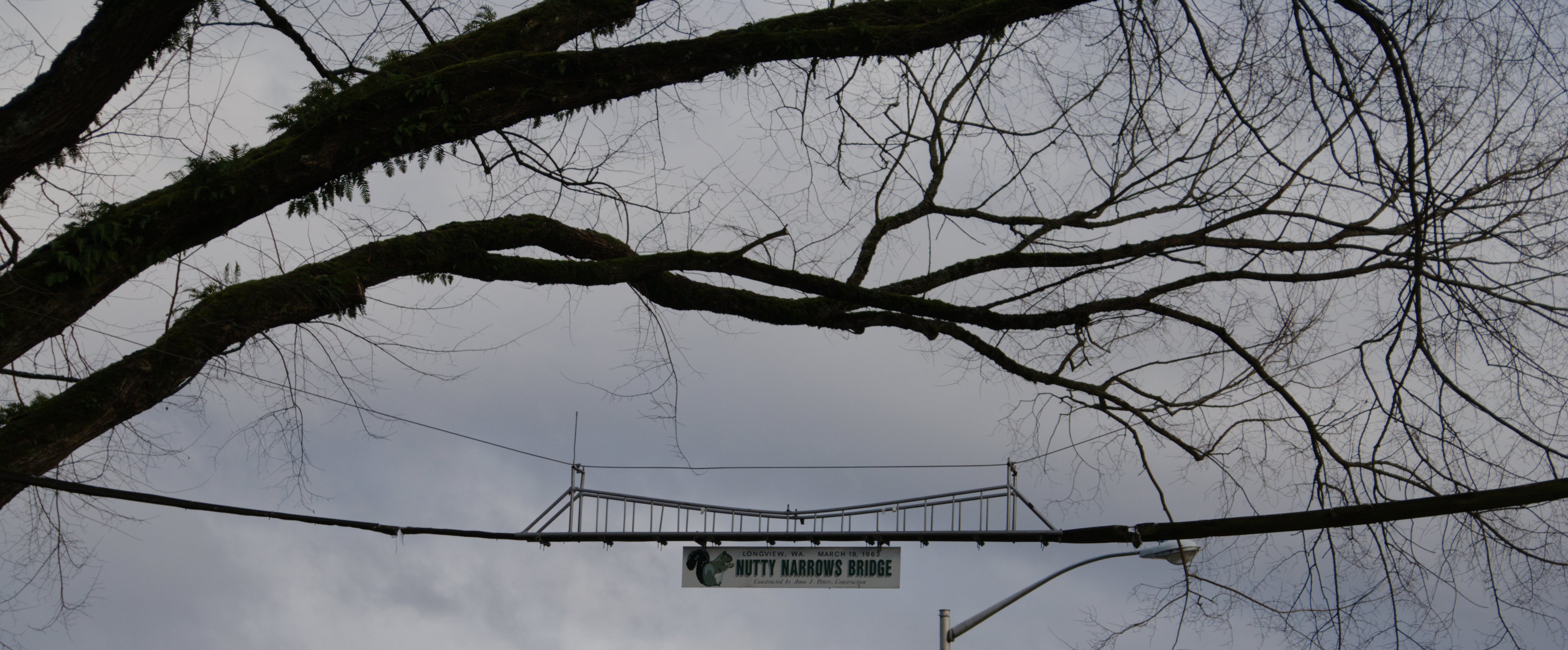
The bridge at its former location in 2008

The bridge was removed by Peters on May 20, 1983, for repairs after the aluminum tubing had begun to noticeably tilt. It was reinstalled on June 8 at its original location; one squirrel had been found dead at the site, having presumably been killed while crossing the road. The bridge's crosspieces were replaced with material donated by the fire departments of Longview and Kelso and its faded sign was repainted. The Nutty Narrows Bridge was officially rededicated on July 2 as part of Longview's Fourth of July celebrations, which included special guests Chip 'n' Dale and Mickey Mouse from Disneyland; it was attended by 300 children and local dignitaries.

One of the two oak trees that served as the anchors for the bridge fell onto Olympia Way on August 9, 1989, leaving the bridge hanging but unusable. Roger Peters, son of original constructor Amos Peters, repainted the bridge's sign and replaced the fire hoses with new material donated by the Longview fire department. The Nutty Narrows Bridge was reinstalled on November 15 using one of the original trees and a new tree nearby. The bridge was quietly removed by the city government for refurbishment in March 1999, prompting local residents to fear that it had been stolen or vandalized. It reopened on April 9.

The city government discovered evidence of termite damage in one of the oak trees that held up the Nutty Narrows Bridge in 2003, prompting fears of a potential collapse. Further termite damage was found in both oak trees two years later and the bridge was removed on May 10, 2003, so that the trees could be safely cut down. The Nutty Narrows was moved 500 ft (150 m) southeast later that week, crossing the Civic Circle adjacent to the city's public library instead of Olympia Way.

The bridge was removed again on the morning of November 4, 2010, after it was deemed to be a traffic hazard due to its new location distracting motorists navigating the three-lane traffic circle around R. A. Long Park. The removal came hours before the arrival of Takehiro Matsumoto, mayor of Wakō, Japan, who had planned to visit the bridge as part of a sister city exchange. The bridge was cleaned and restored by the Sandbaggers, who presided over a reopening and ribbon-cutting ceremony on November 29. The Nutty Narrows was relocated to a section of Olympia Way near 18th Avenue, described as being "three trees away" from the original location.

=== Preservation and related bridges ===
The Nutty Narrows Bridge remains a tourist attraction for Longview and is considered the "world's narrowest bridge". It inspired the name of Squirrel Fest, an annual local festival founded in 2011, as well as a commemorative belt buckle, local sports tournaments, a children's book, and a serial published in The Daily News. It is also decorated annually with a Christmas tree and lights by city maintenance workers. A year after Peters' death in 1984, a ten ft (3.0 m) wooden squirrel sculpture was placed near the bridge in his memory. It was later replaced by the Sandbaggers, a local service fraternity and boosters club charged with oversight of the bridge, in 2001 after it had deteriorated over time.

The structure also inspired similar squirrel bridges that were constructed in other U.S. cities in the 20th and 21st centuries. The city of Salem, Oregon, proposed to buy the original bridge from Amos Peters in 1969, but were declined and instead offered assistance to build their own squirrel bridge by the Sandbaggers. The Salem city council later rejected the offer, stating that the proposed design was not attractive and would have an advertisement for Longview. The offer came amid a disappearance of squirrels following a severe winter; several cities, including Salem, offered to relocate their squirrels to Longview in response to a request from Peters.

Six bridges similar to the Nutty Narrows were constructed in the 2010s by the Sandbaggers around Longview for use by squirrels. They were installed as part of the annual Squirrel Fest, which includes a design contest for the bridges. As of 2022, Longview has ten squirrel bridges, several of which feature designs inspired by other bridges; these include the nearby Lewis and Clark Bridge, the cable-stayed Leonard P. Zakim Bunker Hill Memorial Bridge in Boston, and the Fremont Bridge in Portland, Oregon.

On July 25, 2013, the Longview City Council voted to place the Nutty Narrows Bridge on the Longview Register of Historic Places. As part of the nomination process to add the bridge to the National Register of Historic Places, the bridge was officially sold by Roger Peters to the City of Longview in June 2013 for a nominal fee of $1. It is also listed on the Washington Heritage Register, and was listed on the National Register of Historic Places in 2014.

== Design ==
The Nutty Narrows Bridge spans a section of Olympia Way between two oak trees near 18th Avenue, hanging 22 ft (6.7 m) above street level. It is a 60 ft (18 m) catenary bridge with a flattened canvas fire hose deck. The structure is held aloft by 3/8 in (0.95 cm) guy wire and secured to its anchor trees by a pulley system. At its center is a 10 ft (3.0 m) superstructure that is designed to resemble a suspension bridge with several pieces of aluminum tubing (recycled from a television antenna) forming its supports. A painted sign with the bridge's name, dedication date, and the name of Amos Peters hangs off from the middle of the bridge.

== See also ==
- List of bridges on the National Register of Historic Places in Washington
- National Register of Historic Places listings in Cowlitz County, Washington
