= List of San Diego Padres managers =

The San Diego Padres are an American professional baseball team based in San Diego. The Padres compete in Major League Baseball (MLB) as a member club of the National League (NL) West Division. The team joined MLB in 1969 as an expansion team and have won two NL Championships, in 1984 and 1998. The team played their home games at San Diego Stadium from 1969 to 2003. Starting with the 2004 season, they moved to Petco Park, where they have played since. The team is owned by the estate of Peter Seidler, and A. J. Preller is their general manager. There have been 21 managers of the Padres franchise. The team is currently managed by Mike Shildt.

The first manager of the Padres was Preston Gómez, who managed for four seasons. Bruce Bochy is the franchise's all-time leader for the most regular-season games managed (1926), the most regular-season game wins (951), the most playoff games managed (24), and the most playoff-game wins (8). Bob Skinner is the Padres' all-time leader for the highest regular-season winning percentage, as he has only managed one game, which he won. Of the managers who have managed a minimum of 162 games (one season), Jack McKeon has the highest regular-season winning percentage with .541, having managed for 357 games. Dick Williams, the only Padres manager to have been elected into the Baseball Hall of Fame, is the franchise's all-time leader for the highest playoff winning percentage with .400. Williams and Bochy are the only managers to have won an NL Championship with the Padres, in 1984 and 1998 respectively. Bochy and Black are the only managers to have won a Manager of the Year Award with the Padres, in 1996 and 2010. Greg Riddoch and Jerry Coleman have spent their entire managing careers with the Padres.

== Key ==
#	Number of managers^{[a]}
GM	Regular-season games managed
W	Regular-season wins
L	Regular-season losses
Win%	Regular-season winning percentage
PGM	Playoff games managed
PW	Playoff wins
PL	Playoff losses
PWin%	Playoff winning percentage
*	Spent entire MLB managing career with the Padres
†	Elected into the Baseball Hall of Fame as a manager

== Managers ==
Note: Statistics are correct as through October 11, 2026.

#	Image	Manager	Years	GM	W	L	Win%	PGM	PW	PL	PWin%	Notes
1		Preston Gómez	1969–1972	496	180	316	.363	—	—	—	—	
2		Don Zimmer	1972–1973	304	114	190	.375	—	—	—	—	
3		John McNamara	1974–1977	534	224	310	.419	—	—	—	—	
4		Bob Skinner	1977	1	1	0	1.000	—	—	—	—	
5		Alvin Dark	1977	113	48	65	.425	—	—	—	—	
6		Roger Craig	1978–1979	323	152	171	.471	—	—	—	—	
7		Jerry Coleman*	1980	163	73	89	.451	—	—	—	—	
8		Frank Howard	1981	110	41	69	.373	—	—	—	—	
9		Dick Williams†	1982–1985	649	337	311	.520	10	4	6	.400	1984 NL Champions
10		Steve Boros	1986	162	74	88	.457	—	—	—	—	
11		Larry Bowa	1987–1988	208	81	127	.389	—	—	—	—	
12		Jack McKeon	1988–1990	357	193	164	.541	—	—	—	—	
13		Greg Riddoch*	1990–1992	394	200	194	.508	—	—	—	—	
14		Jim Riggleman	1992–1994	291	112	179	.385	—	—	—	—	
15		Bruce Bochy	1995–2006	1926	951	975	.494	24	8	16	.333	1996 NL Manager of the Year; 1998 NL Champions
16		Bud Black	2007–2015	1362	649	713	.477	—	—	—	—	2010 NL Manager of the Year
17		Dave Roberts	2015	1	0	1	.000	—	—	—	—	
18		Pat Murphy	2015	96	42	54	.438	—	—	—	—	
19		Andy Green	2016–2019	640	274	366	.428	—	—	—	—	
20		Rod Barajas	2019	8	1	7	.125	—	—	—	—	
21		Jayce Tingler	2020–2021	222	116	106	.523	6	2	4	.333	
22		Bob Melvin	2022–2023	324	171	153	.528	12	6	6	.500	
23		Mike Shildt	2024–2025	324	183	141	.565	10	5	5	.500	
24	Craig_Stammen_cropped_7.10.21	Craig Stammen	2026–present	162	91	71	.562	6	3	3	.500	

== Notes ==
- ^{a} A running total of the number of managers of the Padres. Thus, any manager who has two or more separate terms as a manager is only counted once.
- ^{b} Each year is linked to an article about that particular MLB season.
