= Cowlitz County Deserves Better =

- Formation: March 2009
- Type: Ad hoc
- Purpose: To protect fishing, good jobs, and clean air and drinking water in Cowlitz County
- Headquarters: Longview, Washington, US
- Coordinates: 46°08′34″N 122°57′20″W
- Region served: Cowlitz County, Washington
- Members: fishermen, seniors, workers, tribal members, environmentalists, business leaders
- Volunteers: 110
- Website: CowlitzCountyDeservesBetter.com

Cowlitz County Deserves Better is an ad hoc group of more than 100 fishermen, seniors, workers, tribal members and other citizens who live on the lower Columbia River in Washington and Oregon, US. The group is headquartered in Longview, Washington, and has published goals of promoting "good jobs, a clean river, and air and water free of dangerous toxins" in the region.

In April 2009, members of Cowlitz County Deserves Better launched a broad, 6-month investigation into the operational and environmental practices of Chinook Ventures, a private company operating on several hundred riverfront acres owned by Pennsylvania-based aluminum multinational corporation Alcoa, Inc. The investigation was prompted by community concerns over the Washington State Department of Ecology’s issuance of $150,000 USD in fines against Chinook Ventures in March 2009 for "operating without necessary permits and failing to protect air quality and prevent polluted runoff from reaching the Columbia River." The company unsuccessfully appealed the fine.

Cowlitz County Deserves Better's investigation included interviews with current and former employees of Chinook Ventures, hundreds of public documents, and site visits from land and water. They compiled their findings, which included a list of more than a dozen suspected environmental and labor violations, and began a public education campaign in November 2009.

One of the group's primary concerns is that the City of Longview is drilling for drinking water near the site. In January 2010, the Longview Daily News reported:

Cowlitz County Deserves Better, a grass-roots group that advocates for clean water for fishing and drinking, passed out fliers in the Longview City Council chambers Thursday saying the city should postpone a decision on the water supply until the state is finished investigating and addressing alleged environmental violations at Chinook Ventures. ... That company's site on Industrial Way, across the street from the Mint Farm, was contaminated by decades of Reynolds Metals Co.'s aluminum production, and hazardous materials have been found in the ground and groundwater.

In February 2010, state investigators suspected Chinook Ventures as the source of a mile-long plume of a black substance, reported to be "two to five dump truck loads of petroleum coke". that was floating down the Columbia River. A Cowlitz County Deserves Better spokesperson told the Oregonian newspaper that "We're afraid that this spill of petcoke is just the beginning of more to come."
