= Lake Sacajawea (Longview, Washington) =

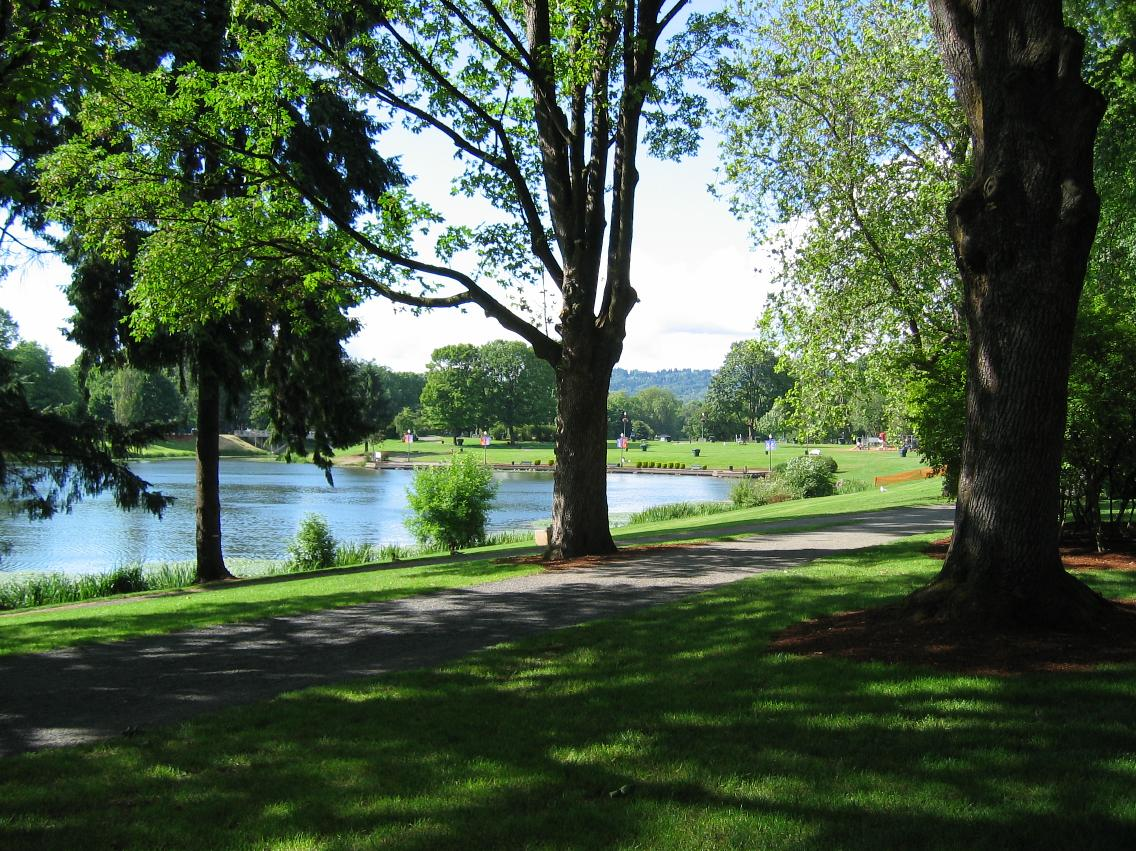
- A former slough, Lake Sacajawea was created during the construction of Longview

- Location within Washington (state) Location within the United States
- Location: Longview, Cowlitz County, Washington
- Coordinates: 46.137°N 122.952°W
- Type: man-made lake
- Etymology: Sacajawea

Lake Sacajawea is a man-made lake in Longview, Washington. It is named after the Shoshone woman named Sacajawea who guided Meriwether Lewis and William Clark during their expedition to the Pacific Ocean. The lake is made up of four sections, each separated by a bridged road. Several small parks are part of the larger Lake Sacajawea Park. Lake Sacajawea Park is a 67-acre (27 ha) park in the middle of the city. The lake's water is pumped into the north end from the Cowlitz River and flows to the south end where it exits into the Columbia River.

== Construction ==
The lake was constructed in 1924 when what was then known as Fowler's Slough was dredged. Prior to dredging, Fowler's Slough was a channel of the Cowlitz River. This project was part of the larger project of founding the town of Longview by Robert A. Long.

== Japanese garden ==
In 1990, the idea was conceived to create a Japanese garden on one of the lake's islands. Over the following years and with help from the community, the garden was developed.

The idea and design for the garden came from then Longview Parks Superintendent Al George. He had the idea from seeing gardens while stationed in Japan during his time in the navy.

== Go 4th Festival ==
During the week of July 4th, Lake Sacajawea hosts an annual festival which includes a flea market, a parade, concerts, and a fireworks show. The festival began in the 1960s and attracts more than 30,000 people per year.

== Solar System walk ==
In 2001, the Friends of Galileo Astronomy Club installed plaques along the lake's trail. These plaques make up a scale model of the Solar System which can be followed by walking along the west side of the lake. Each plaque provides details about the planet it represents.
