= Laughlin Round Barn =

- U.S. National Register of Historic Places
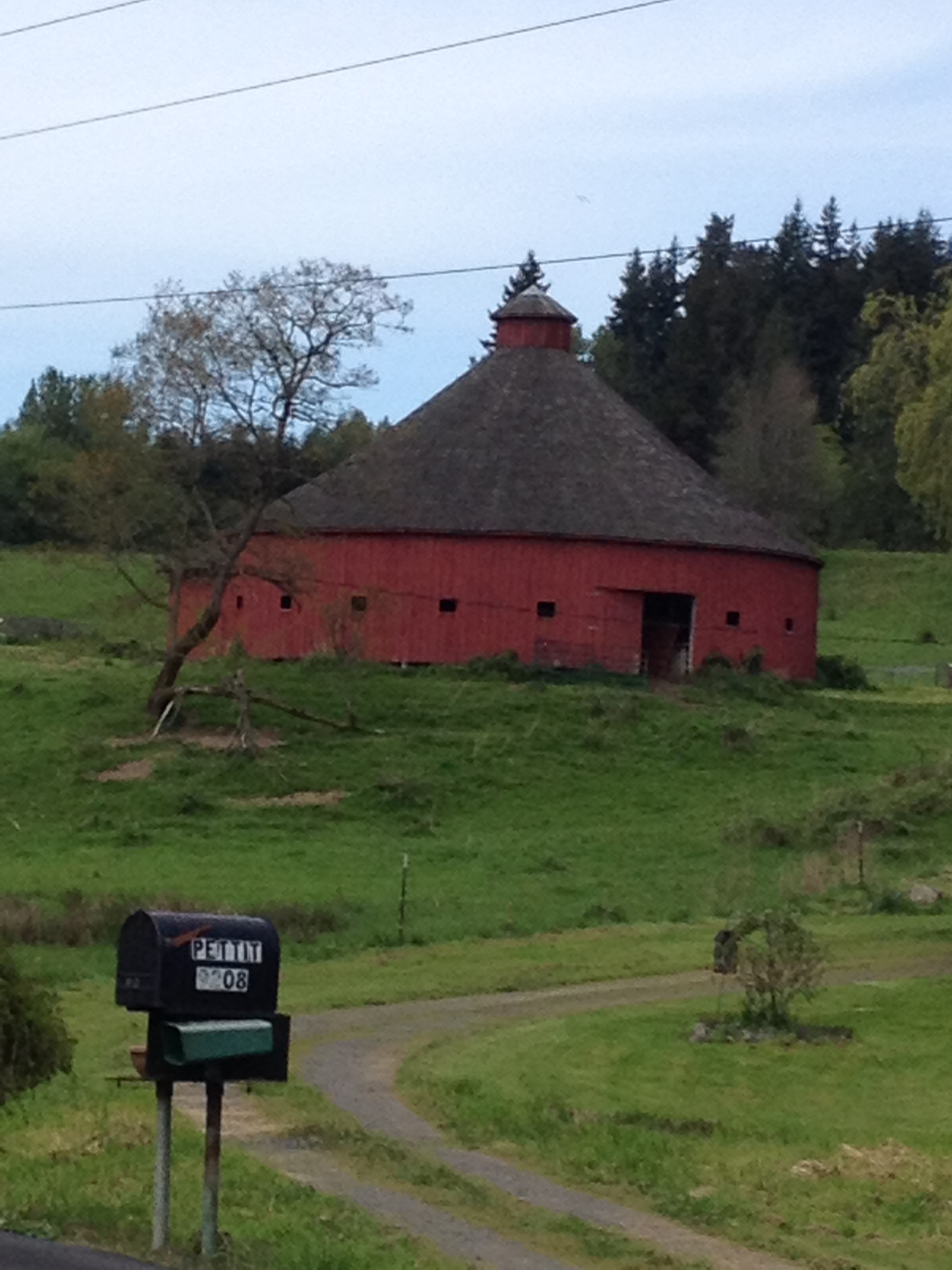

- Location within Washington (state) Location within the United States
- Nearest city: Castle Rock, Washington
- Coordinates: 46°20′25″N 122°55′24″W
- Area: less than one acre
- Built: 1883
- Built by: Samuel Laughlin
- Architectural style: Round Barn
- NRHP reference No.: 86001080
- Added to NRHP: May 15, 1986

The Laughlin Round Barn near Castle Rock, Washington is a round barn built in 1883. It was listed on the National Register of Historic Places in 1986. The Laughlin Barn is one of fewer than five within the state. According to one scholar of farm structures, the Laughlin Barn is also probably the oldest round barn in Washington State if not in the northwest three state region." The Laughlin Round Barn was contemporary with the national construction of round barns in the United States, beginning in the 1880s and continuing until the 1920s. The round barn was popular for dairy farming. This was a period of experimentation by agricultural colleges and the publication of plans in farm journals. The advantages claimed were an economy of materials and a "greater efficiency in feeding and maintaining animals.”

Eventually, as labor became more expensive and farms increased in size, round forms ceased to be advantageous economically and the construction of round barns became less frequent. Only seven round barns have been identified between 1880 and 1920 in Washington. Only four remained in 1986. Additionally, nine or ten polygonal barns were constructed in Washington, of which six or seven are known to be standing. Constructed about 1882, the Laughlin barn was unusually early in the era of round barns. The round barns in eastern and central Washington were constructed between 1915 and 1925. In the southwestern part of the state, a polygonal and two other round barns were constructed. A polygonal barn in neighboring Wahkiakum County was constructed as early as the 1880s. Another round barn in Wahkiakum County, with a large onion-domed dairy barn constructed about 1915, has fallen within the last two years.

== Laughlin Family History ==
The Laughlin Barn was constructed by Samuel Laughlin (1843-1910), who immigrated from Missouri to Cowlitz County with his family in 1873. Laughlin and his wife Eliza first settled in Olequa. Laughlin worked as a land surveyor for the government, briefly as a school teacher, and for several years as a section foreman for the railroad bridge crew. He also served as the second postmaster in Olequa, operating the post office out of his home for several years. In August 1877, the Laughlins purchased the 80-acre Cowlitz Valley tract. It was not until December of 1881 that the family moved to the property. During this time, the Victorian residence was under construction. The barn’s construction was shortly after the family moved into their new home about 1881. It is known that the substantial Victorian house on the farmstead had been built at least by the early 1880s. The homestead house burned in 1923. The barn was built shortly after. Samuel Laughlin had constructed a house in Missouri, and a barn with the help of his son Peter. It is believed that Laughlin had seen examples of round barns while visiting relatives in Oregon.

== Appearance ==
The Laughlin Round Barn is a wooden pole barn. The barn and other structures, including a residence, are on the edge of a rise several feet above the valley floor. The Cowlitz River forms a part of the southern boundary of the L-shaped tract. To the north and east of the structures is a large field which rises to a ridge covered in old growth and second generation Douglas fir and maple trees located on the farm. On the property is a school (built in 1898 with considerably alterations in the 20th century), two sheds, a county cemetery with about thirty stone markers, and the remnants of an old orchard. The 80 acre farm also includes pasturage and wooded areas and the remains of an orchard.

=== Barn ===
The barn is built on a circular wall with a conical roof. The wall is sided with board and batten and rises to a central column and cupola. A central wagon drive runs through the barn to the west of the central column. The wagon door faces north along the edge of the upper field. Extending from the entry is a gable shed. A lean-to addition, a pig pen, attached to the east wall of the entry shed. The barn contains a large upper-level loft. The outer wall is approximately 63 feet (19 m) in diameter, supported by a ring of 20 split posts which are breast high in the loft. An inner ring of 13 posts, 40 feet (12 m) in diameter, rises to support the rafters and define the edge of the loft's central space. A striking feature of the loft is the fan shaped bracing which rises in a vault from the central post to support the rafters. On the ground floor, a livestock alley runs along the perimeter wall. Stalls face an inner ring of posts. There are numerous stalls for cows, four horse stalls, and three stanchions for calves. In the central area of the ground floor are two small spaces on either side of the central drive: a granary to the west, and a larger storage room to the east. The stalls are accessed by a narrow feeding alley behind the curving walls of the granary and storage room.

The framing is made from hand hewn, split, or planed beams. Included are a massive central post which tapers dimension as it rises; the post and beam framing members, 12 inches (30 cm) wide and between 12 and 17 inches (30 and 43 cm) deep; and the rings of posts, which are split, quarter round logs with the rounded edge facing outward.

== Bibliographical ==
- Dole, Philip, Professor of Architecture, University of Oregon, "Farmhouses and Barns of the Willamette Valley." Space. Style and Structure.
- Toor, Karen, and Ron Tower, "Hall Round Barn, Ethnoarchaeology in Whitman County, Wa.," Washington State University, Pullman, 1983.
- Garvey, Kathryn Keatley, (Great-granddaughter of Samuel Laughlin), "Samuel Davidson Laughlin, 11 unpublished manuscripts, December, 1985.
