= Longview, Washington =

City in Washington, United States

- City
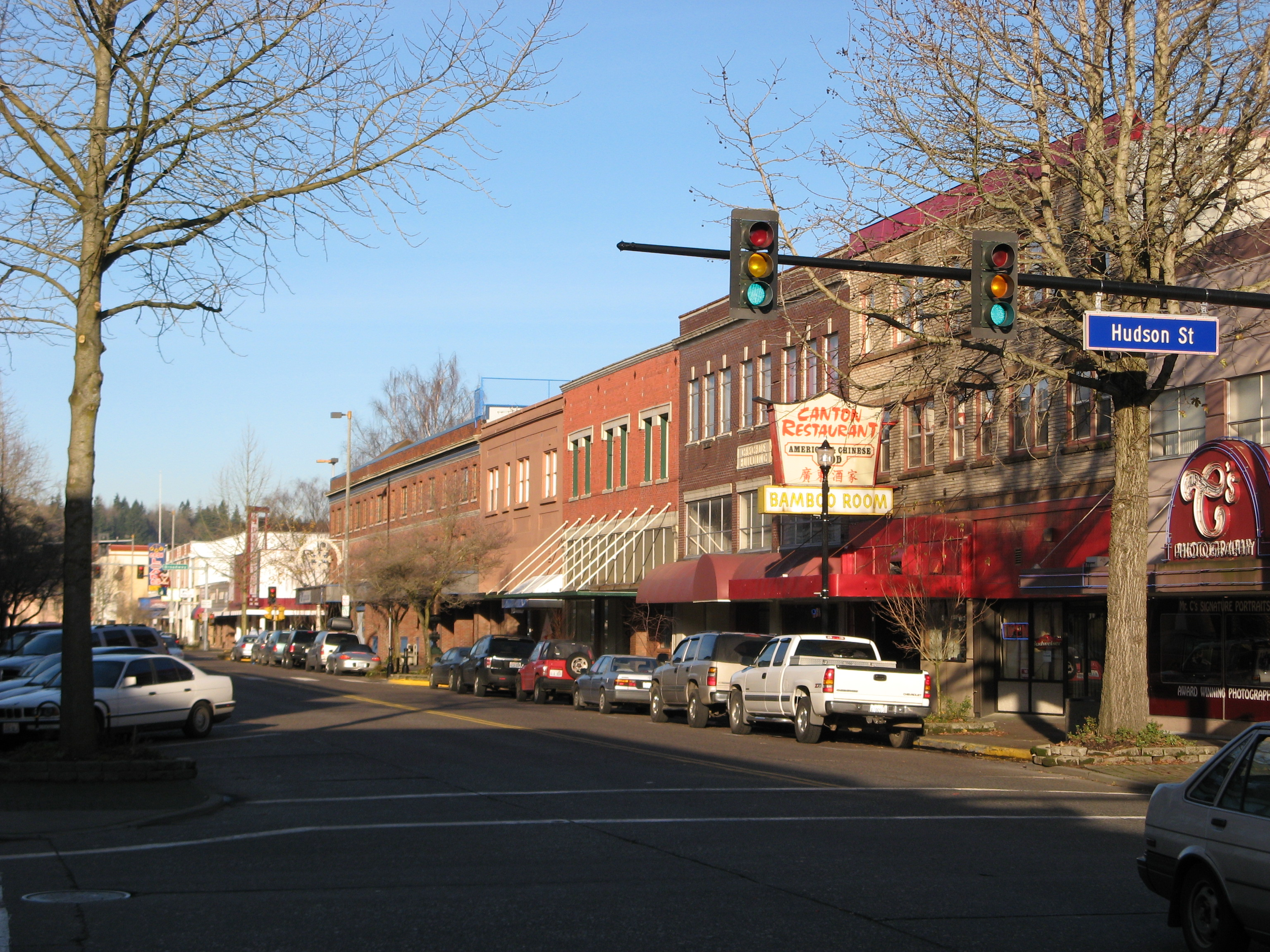
- Downtown Longview
- Nickname: The City Of Trees
- Motto: R. A. Long's Planned City
- Interactive map of Longview, Washington
- Coordinates: 46°08′24″N 122°57′45″W
- Country: United States
- State: Washington
- County: Cowlitz
- Settled: 1850s
- Incorporated: February 14, 1924

Government
  - Type: Council-Manager
  - Mayor: Erik Halvorson
  - Mayor Pro Tempore: Keith Young

Area
  - City: 15.33 sq mi (39.71 km^{2})
  - Land: 14.79 sq mi (38.30 km^{2})
  - Water: 0.54 sq mi (1.41 km^{2})
- Elevation: 13 ft (4.0 m)

Population (2020)
  - City: 37,818
  - Estimate (2024): 38,294
  - Density: 2,599.6/sq mi (1,003.73/km^{2})
  - Metro: 110,730 (US: 342th)
- Time zone: UTC-8 (PST)
  - Summer (DST): UTC-7 (PDT)
- ZIP Code: 98632
- Area code: 360, 564
- FIPS code: 53-40245
- GNIS feature ID: 2410871
- Website: mylongview.com

Longview is a city in Cowlitz County, Washington, United States. It is the principal city of the Longview, Washington, Metropolitan Statistical Area, which encompasses all of Cowlitz County. Longview's population was 37,818 at the time of the 2020 census, making it the most populous city in Cowlitz County. The city is located in southwestern Washington, at the junction of the Cowlitz and Columbia rivers. Longview shares a border with Kelso to the east, which is the county seat.

The Cowlitz Indian Tribe, a federally recognized tribe of Cowlitz people, is headquartered in Longview.

The Long-Bell Lumber Company, led by Robert A. Long, decided to buy a great expanse of timberland in Cowlitz County in 1918. A total of 14,000 workers were needed to run the two large mills as well as lumber camps that were planned. The number of workers needed was more than a lumber town, or the nearest town, could provide. Long planned and built a complete city in 1921 that could support a population of up to 50,000 and provide labor for the mills as well as attracting other industries. Several buildings in the city were built from Long's private funds.

== History ==
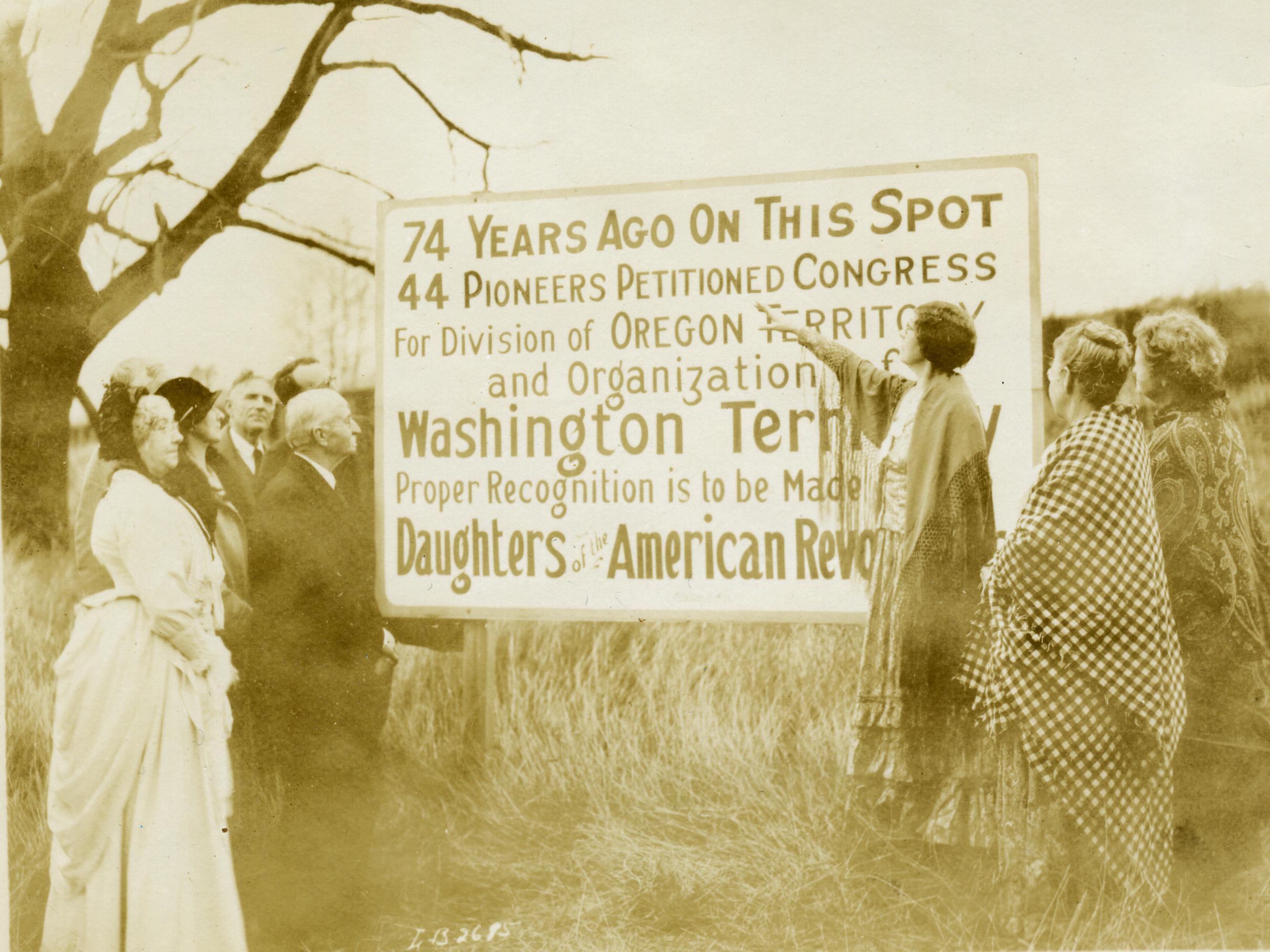
Monticello Convention marker dedication, 1927

Longview was the location of Mount Coffin, an ancestral burial ground for the local indigenous people.

The first Euro-American settlers were led by Harry and Rebecca Jane Huntington, in 1849. The area was named Monticello in honor of Thomas Jefferson's home in Virginia. In 1852 a group assembled in what would be called the "Monticello Convention" to petition Congress for statehood to be called "Columbia". Congress agreed to statehood but as Washington, after President Washington, to avoid confusion with the District of Columbia. A monument to the convention is located near the Longview Civic Center. From 1854 to 1865 the town of Monticello was the seat of Cowlitz County, before being destroyed by the flooding of the Cowlitz River in December 1867. In 1865 Nathaniel Stone founded the town of Freeport (a mile upriver from Monticello) which became the seat of Cowlitz County until 1872. The area of the towns of Monticello and Freeport is now part of the city of Longview.

The area remained sparsely populated for nearly 60 years, consisting mostly of farmland and wilderness. In 1918, Missouri timber baron Robert A. Long (1850–1934) decided to move his operation out to the west coast, owing to the Long-Bell Lumber Company's dwindling supplies in the south. By 1921, Wesley Vandercook had decided to build a mill near the small town of Kelso, Washington. It was apparent that Kelso, with a population of barely 2,000, would not be able to support the approximately 14,000 men that would be required to run the mill.

The Long-Bell company contracted with George Kessler, a city planner based in St. Louis, to build the city that would support the two mills that were now planned. Kessler designed the town based on the nation's capital, with elements of Roman City planning. Its theme is rooted in the City Beautiful movement, which influenced urban design in the early 20th century. Longview was officially incorporated on February 14, 1924. At the time of its conception, Longview was the only planned city of its magnitude to have ever been conceived of and built entirely with private funds. A number of prominent buildings in Longview were purchased with R. A. Long's personal funds, including R. A. Long High School, the Longview Public Library, the YMCA building and the Monticello Hotel.

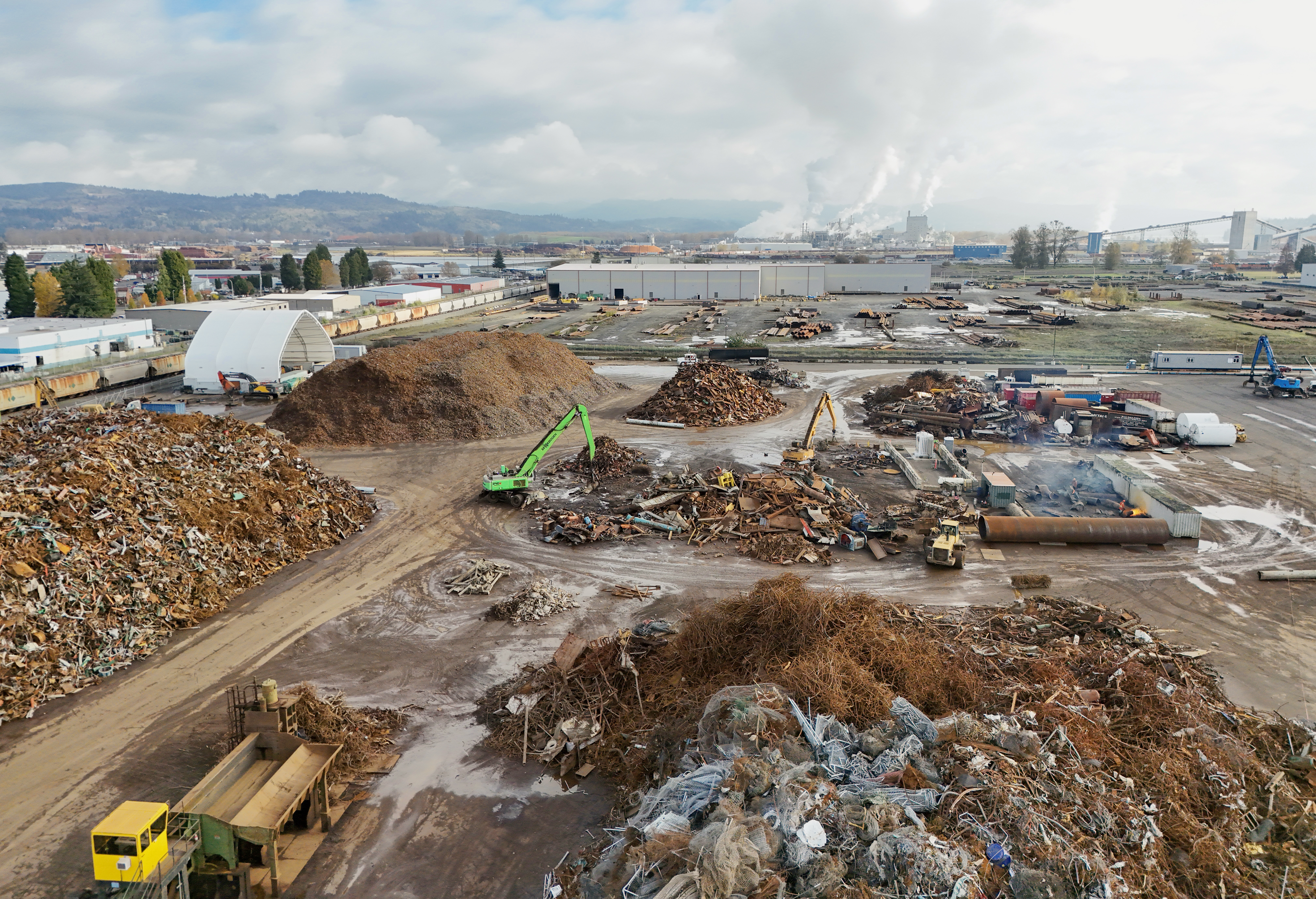
Scrap metal recycling facility in Longview's industrial zone

The initial growth period, lasting from 1923 to 1934, was very rapid. The city grew from a few thousand people to being the fourth largest city in the state by the 1930s. However, the effects of the Great Depression hampered further development of the planned city until the booming World War II economy, when the Port of Longview became a strategic location for loading cargo going into the Pacific Theater.

The Allen Street Bridge disaster, which involved a wooden drawbridge connecting Longview and Kelso, occurred on January 3, 1923. As of 2024, the event is recognized as the deadliest bridge disaster in the state. The span collapsed under a combination of high, rushing waters of the Cowlitz River, a log jam, and the poor condition of the overpass. The disaster happened during the end of work day, and 17 people were formally listed as having died due to the event.

Suburban developments created neighborhoods in the western valley in the 1960s. The local economy has been in decline since lumber companies mechanized production in the 1970s and 1980s, reducing the availability of jobs. No major development occurred until a brief boom in the early 2000s, ended by the recession of the late 2000s.

On May 26, 2026, at about 7:19 a.m., a large tank containing white liquor at the Nippon Dynawave Packaging ruptured and imploded. The incident killed at least eleven people and injured eight others.

== Geography ==
According to the United States Census Bureau, the city has a total area of 14.79 square miles (38.31 km^{2}), of which 14.49 square miles (37.53 km^{2}) is land and 0.30 square miles (0.78 km^{2}) is water.

The Lewis and Clark Bridge spans the Columbia River, linking Longview to Rainier, Oregon. It is the only bridge spanning the river between Portland and Astoria, Oregon.

=== Climate ===
Longview is located in a small gorge, so its climate varies from that of its close neighbor, Portland. Longview is generally about 7 °F (4 °C) cooler than Portland. Located about 80 miles (130 km) inland across a stretch of relatively flat ground, the Longview skies can be overcast due to moisture from the Pacific Coast marine layer. The Columbia River gorge permits an exchange of air between eastern and western Washington. The direction and speed of air movement through the gorge is determined primarily by the pressure gradient between the eastern and western slopes of the mountains. Due to the gorge-like effect, marine pushes on summer evenings can frequently reach gusts up to 30 to 40 miles per hour (48 to 64 km/h) There have been gusts of up to 90 to 100 miles per hour (140 to 160 km/h), and over 100 miles per hour (160 km/h) at higher elevations.

Fall is usually cooler but foggy; on some days the fog never clears. By early-to-mid November, rainfall begins in typical Northwest fashion. Winter tends to be chilly and rainy, with occasional violent windstorms or spates of unusually warm—65 to 70 °F (18 to 21 °C)—temperatures. This is due to extremely warm air coming from the Pineapple Express which can drop 3 to 6 inches (76 to 152 mm) of rain in a matter of days. Each year there are one or two snowfalls, typically less than 6 inches (15 cm) but up to 1 metre (3 ft) in the surrounding foothills. Spring is warmer, but still a little wet; this is the most common time for the occasional thunderstorms.

Climate data for Longview, Washington, 1991–2020 normals, extremes 1925–present
Month	Jan	Feb	Mar	Apr	May	Jun	Jul	Aug	Sep	Oct	Nov	Dec	Year
Record high °F (°C)	65 (18)	73 (23)	82 (28)	90 (32)	99 (37)	107 (42)	105 (41)	108 (42)	104 (40)	90 (32)	76 (24)	64 (18)	108 (42)
Mean maximum °F (°C)	57.5 (14.2)	63.2 (17.3)	69.9 (21.1)	78.9 (26.1)	87.0 (30.6)	89.3 (31.8)	94.4 (34.7)	95.0 (35.0)	89.4 (31.9)	76.6 (24.8)	63.5 (17.5)	56.4 (13.6)	98.4 (36.9)
Mean daily maximum °F (°C)	47.7 (8.7)	52.0 (11.1)	56.9 (13.8)	62.1 (16.7)	68.8 (20.4)	72.9 (22.7)	79.3 (26.3)	80.4 (26.9)	75.7 (24.3)	64.0 (17.8)	53.1 (11.7)	46.6 (8.1)	63.3 (17.4)
Daily mean °F (°C)	41.4 (5.2)	43.4 (6.3)	47.2 (8.4)	51.2 (10.7)	57.1 (13.9)	61.2 (16.2)	66.4 (19.1)	66.9 (19.4)	62.6 (17.0)	54.0 (12.2)	45.8 (7.7)	40.7 (4.8)	53.2 (11.7)
Mean daily minimum °F (°C)	35.1 (1.7)	34.7 (1.5)	37.5 (3.1)	40.4 (4.7)	45.3 (7.4)	49.5 (9.7)	53.4 (11.9)	53.3 (11.8)	49.6 (9.8)	44.1 (6.7)	38.6 (3.7)	34.8 (1.6)	43.0 (6.1)
Mean minimum °F (°C)	24.4 (−4.2)	25.0 (−3.9)	29.0 (−1.7)	31.9 (−0.1)	37.1 (2.8)	42.0 (5.6)	46.3 (7.9)	46.2 (7.9)	41.1 (5.1)	33.3 (0.7)	26.9 (−2.8)	23.1 (−4.9)	19.3 (−7.1)
Record low °F (°C)	−6 (−21)	2 (−17)	19 (−7)	24 (−4)	27 (−3)	30 (−1)	32 (0)	35 (2)	29 (−2)	23 (−5)	8 (−13)	4 (−16)	−6 (−21)
Average precipitation inches (mm)	6.53 (166)	4.81 (122)	4.91 (125)	4.08 (104)	3.11 (79)	2.03 (52)	0.63 (16)	0.97 (25)	2.29 (58)	4.38 (111)	7.24 (184)	7.14 (181)	48.12 (1,223)
Average precipitation days (≥ 0.01 in)	23.9	19.6	21.4	19.3	13.6	11.3	4.7	5.2	8.6	17.4	22.8	24.3	192.1
Source 1: NOAA
Source 2: National Weather Service

== Demographics ==
Historical population
Census	Pop.	Note	%±
1930	10,652		—
1940	12,385		16.3%
1950	20,339		64.2%
1960	23,349		14.8%
1970	28,373		21.5%
1980	31,052		9.4%
1990	31,499		1.4%
2000	34,660		10.0%
2010	36,648		5.7%
2020	37,818		3.2%
2024 (est.)	38,294		1.3%
U.S. Decennial Census; 2020 Census

=== 2020 census ===
As of the 2020 census, Longview had a population of 37,818, 15,511 households, and a median age of 40.6 years; 21.7% of residents were under the age of 18 and 21.2% were 65 years of age or older. For every 100 females there were 93.4 males, and for every 100 females age 18 and over there were 91.3 males age 18 and over. 5.9% of residents were under the age of 5.

The population density was 2,555.6 inhabitants per square mile. As of the 2020 census, 99.8% of residents lived in urban areas while 0.2% lived in rural areas.

Of the 15,511 households, 27.2% had children under the age of 18 living in them, 39.1% were married-couple households, 20.0% were households with a male householder and no spouse or partner present, and 30.9% were households with a female householder and no spouse or partner present. About 31.6% of all households were made up of individuals and 16.2% had someone living alone who was 65 years of age or older.

There were 16,478 housing units, of which 5.9% were vacant. The homeowner vacancy rate was 1.6% and the rental vacancy rate was 6.3%.

The median household income was $53,044, and the per capita income was $31,980. 13.7% of the population were under the poverty line.

Racial composition as of the 2020 census
Race	Number	Percent
White	29,891	79.0%
Black or African American	468	1.2%
American Indian and Alaska Native	634	1.7%
Asian	952	2.5%
Native Hawaiian and Other Pacific Islander	244	0.6%
Some other race	1,944	5.1%
Two or more races	3,685	9.7%
Hispanic or Latino (of any race)	4,479	11.8%

=== 2010 census ===
As of the 2010 census, there were 36,648 people, 15,281 households, and 9,086 families residing in the city. The population density was 2,529.2 inhabitants per square mile (976.5/km^{2}). There were 16,380 housing units at an average density of 1,130.4 per square mile (436.4/km^{2}). The racial makeup of the city was 86.0% White, 0.9% African American, 1.7% Native American, 2.2% Asian, 0.3% Pacific Islander, 4.7% from other races, and 4.2% from two or more races. Hispanic or Latino of any race were 9.7% of the population.

There were 15,281 households, of which 29.1% had children under the age of 18 living with them, 40.5% were married couples living together, 13.4% had a female householder with no husband present, 5.6% had a male householder with no wife present, and 40.5% were non-families. 33.6% of all households were made up of individuals, and 15.4% had someone living alone who was 65 years of age or older. The average household size was 2.34 and the average family size was 2.94.

The median age in the city was 39.6 years. 23.2% of residents were under the age of 18; 9.2% were between the ages of 18 and 24; 23.6% were from 25 to 44; 26.2% were from 45 to 64; and 17.5% were 65 years of age or older. The gender makeup of the city was 48.1% male and 51.9% female.

=== 2000 census ===
As of the 2000 census, there were 34,660 people, 14,066 households, and 8,931 families residing in the city. The population density was 2,530.0 people per square mile (976.8/km^{2}). There were 15,225 housing units at an average density of 1,111.4 per square mile (429.1/km^{2}). The racial makeup of the city was 89.35% White, 0.72% African American, 1.76% Native American, 2.17% Asian, 0.13% Pacific Islander, 2.96% from other races, and 2.92% from two or more races. Hispanic or Latino of any race were 5.82% of the population. 17.3% were of German, 11.2% English, 10.3% United States or American, 8.5% Irish and 7.3% Norwegian ancestry. 92.4% spoke English and 4.9% Spanish as their first language.

There were 14,066 households, out of which 30.9% had children under the age of 18 living with them, 46.5% were married couples living together, 12.3% had a female householder with no husband present, and 36.5% were non-families. 30.1% of all households were made up of individuals, and 12.4% had someone living alone who was 65 years of age or older. The average household size was 2.40 and the average family size was 2.96.

In the city, the age distribution of the population shows 26.0% under the age of 18, 8.9% from 18 to 24, 27.1% from 25 to 44, 22.6% from 45 to 64, and 15.4% who were 65 years of age or older. The median age was 37 years. For every 100 females, there were 93.2 males. For every 100 females age 18 and over, there were 90.0 males.

The median income for a household in the city was $35,171, and the median income for a family was $43,869. Males had a median income of $38,972 versus $26,625 for females. The per capita income for the city was $18,559. About 12.3% of families and 16.7% of the population were below the poverty line, including 25.0% of those under age 18 and 6.8% of those age 65 or over.

== Economy ==
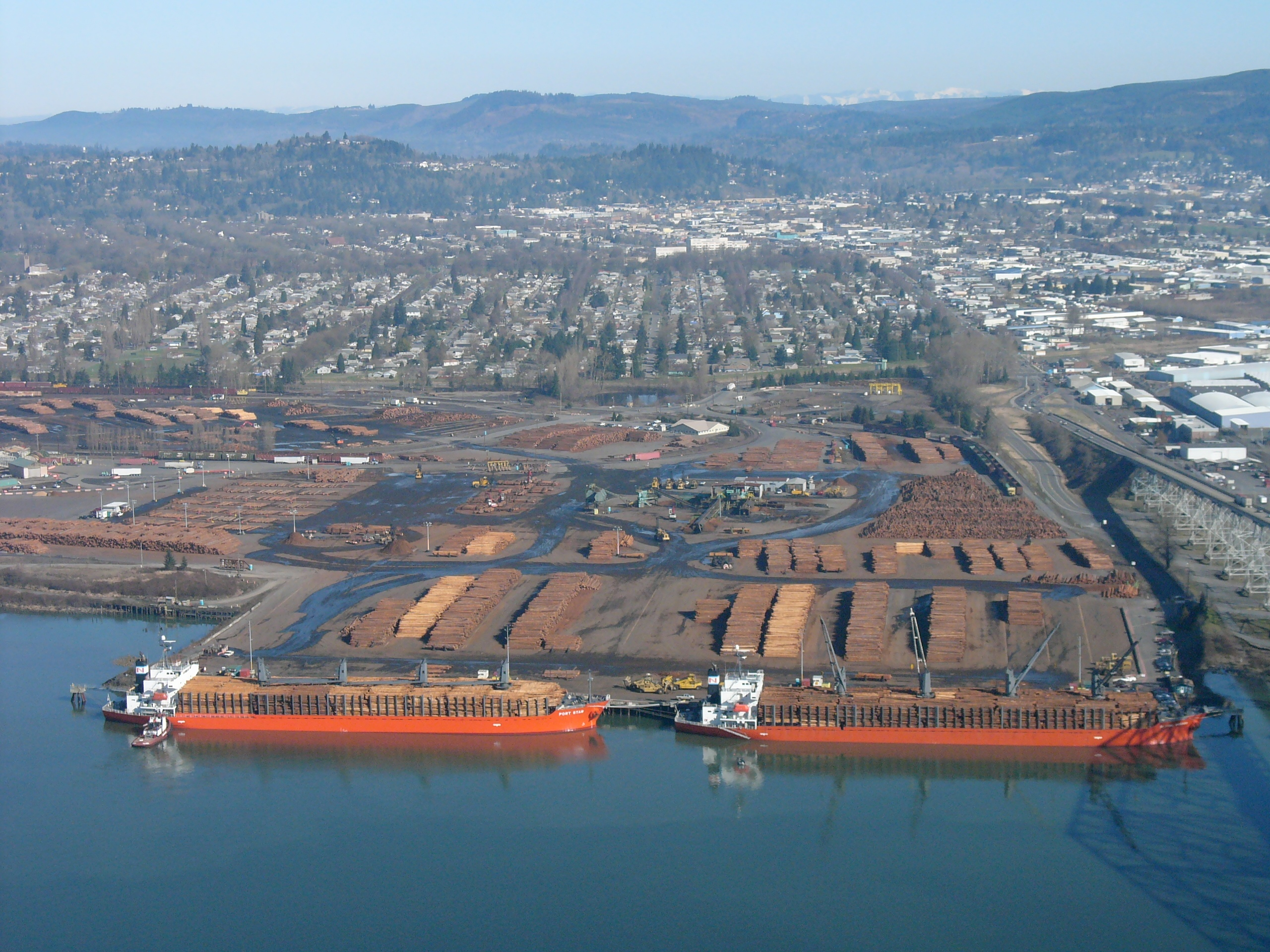
Timber for export, Port of Longview, 2008

Manufacturing in Longview accounts for 19% of the employment. Easy access to the Columbia River, Interstate 5, and the west coast railways has attracted a rapidly diversifying manufacturing base. The abundance of timber around Longview provides the city's former two largest employers, Weyerhaeuser and Kapstone, now Smurfit Westrock, with timber products. Other major manufacturers in Longview include NORPAC (newsprint), Solvay Chemicals (hydrogen peroxide), and Westlake Chemical (formerly Axiall). Smaller operations include Epson Toyocom, Northwest Hardwoods, Interfor (originally Caffall Brothers, then Stimpson lumber, now Interfor US Inc), Peterson Manufacturing, JM Huber, Specialty Minerals, HASA and the Simpson Timber Company.

== Arts and culture ==
Every Independence Day, Longview hosts the Go Fourth Fest at Lake Sacajawea. Over 30,000 people visit the lake's vendor booths, live concerts, and exhibits. The festival also includes a parade starting downtown and ending at the park and a fireworks display.

=== Historic landmarks ===
Longview has many historic buildings, many of which were built in the initial growth period from 1923 to 1934, prior to the worst effects of the Great Depression. Ranging from Georgian-revival style with the major public buildings, Tudor and craftsman style homes, commercial vernacular, and Art Deco, there are many contributing properties. A park, a bridge, and many buildings are listed on the National Register of Historic Places, along with the Civic Center, that is a National Register Historic District.

- Berwind-Purcell House
- Big Four Furniture Building – Built in 1924 for Lumberman's Bank.
- Columbia Theatre
- First Christian Church
- Lake Sacajawea Park
- R. A. Long High School
- Longview Bridge – Also known as the Lewis and Clark Bridge.
- Nutty Narrows Bridge - Is a squirrel bridge in Longview.
- Longview Civic Center Historic District
- Longview Community Church
- Longview Community Church-Saint Helen's Addition
- Longview Community Store
- Longview Women's Clubhouse
- Mills Building
- Pacific Telephone and Telegraph Building
- Pounder Building
- Schumann Building
- Sevier and Weed Building
- J. D. Tennant House
- Tyni Building
- US Post Office – Longview Main
- Washington Gas and Electric Building
- Willard Building

== Sports ==
The Cowlitz Black Bears play in the West Coast League, an independent summer baseball league with teams from Washington, Oregon, and British Columbia. The team plays at David Story Field on the Lower Columbia College campus in Longview.

== Parks and recreation ==
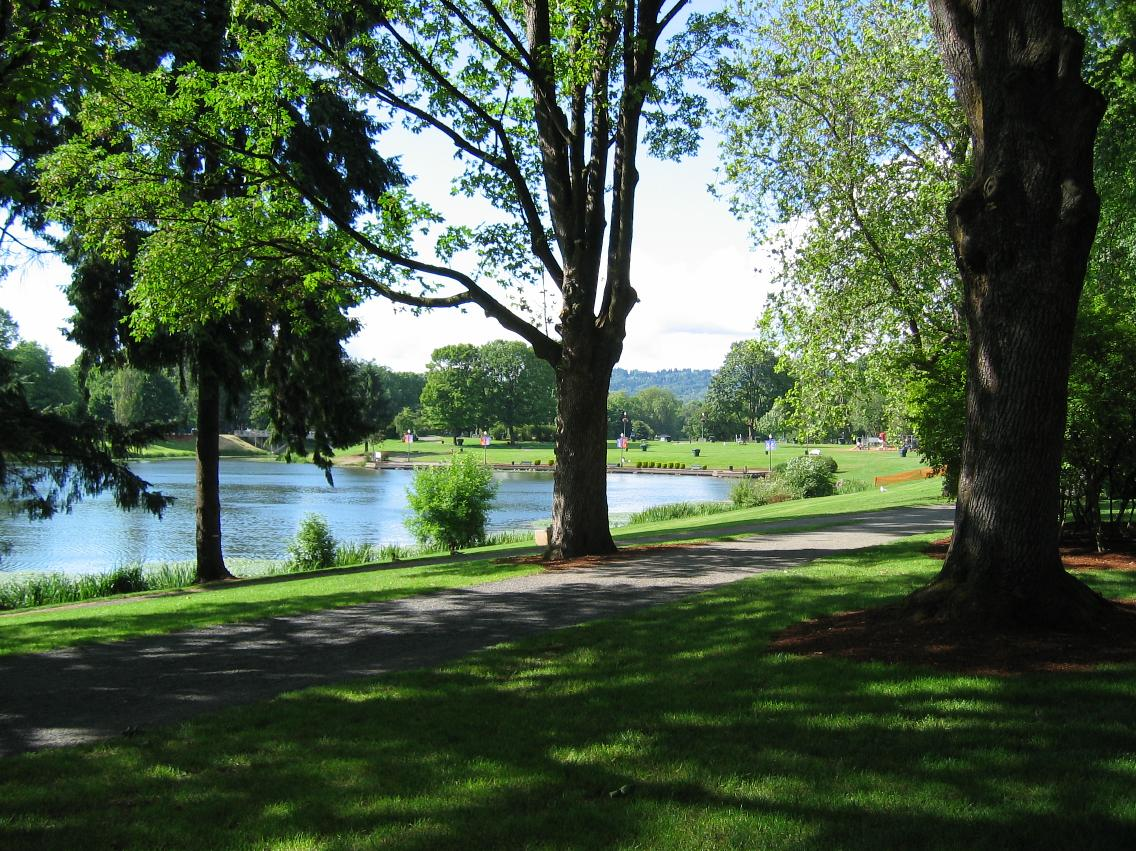
A former slough, Lake Sacajawea was created during the construction of Longview

Longview has a variety of parks and recreation facilities. Longview Parks and Recreation maintains the local parks, including Lake Sacajawea. Dozens of other parks exist within city limits with walking trails, sport fields, dog-friendly areas, children's play areas, and other features. Both Longview and its neighbor city, Kelso, are home to skateparks. Two athletic clubs exist, including the YMCA and Mint Valley Racquet and Fitness. Golf clubs in the local area include Longview Country Club and Mint Valley. The Longview parks and Recreation also works with youths of different ages with programs such as the elementary and middle schools after-school programs, The Boulevard for youths of grades 6–12, and Youth and Family link.

== Government ==
The city has seven council members with one serving as the mayor as well as a city manager. The city council elects a mayor out of themselves every two years. The mayor runs the council meetings, and serves as the ceremonial figure head of the city. Day-to-day operations are conducted by the City Manager, who is hired by the city council.

== Education ==
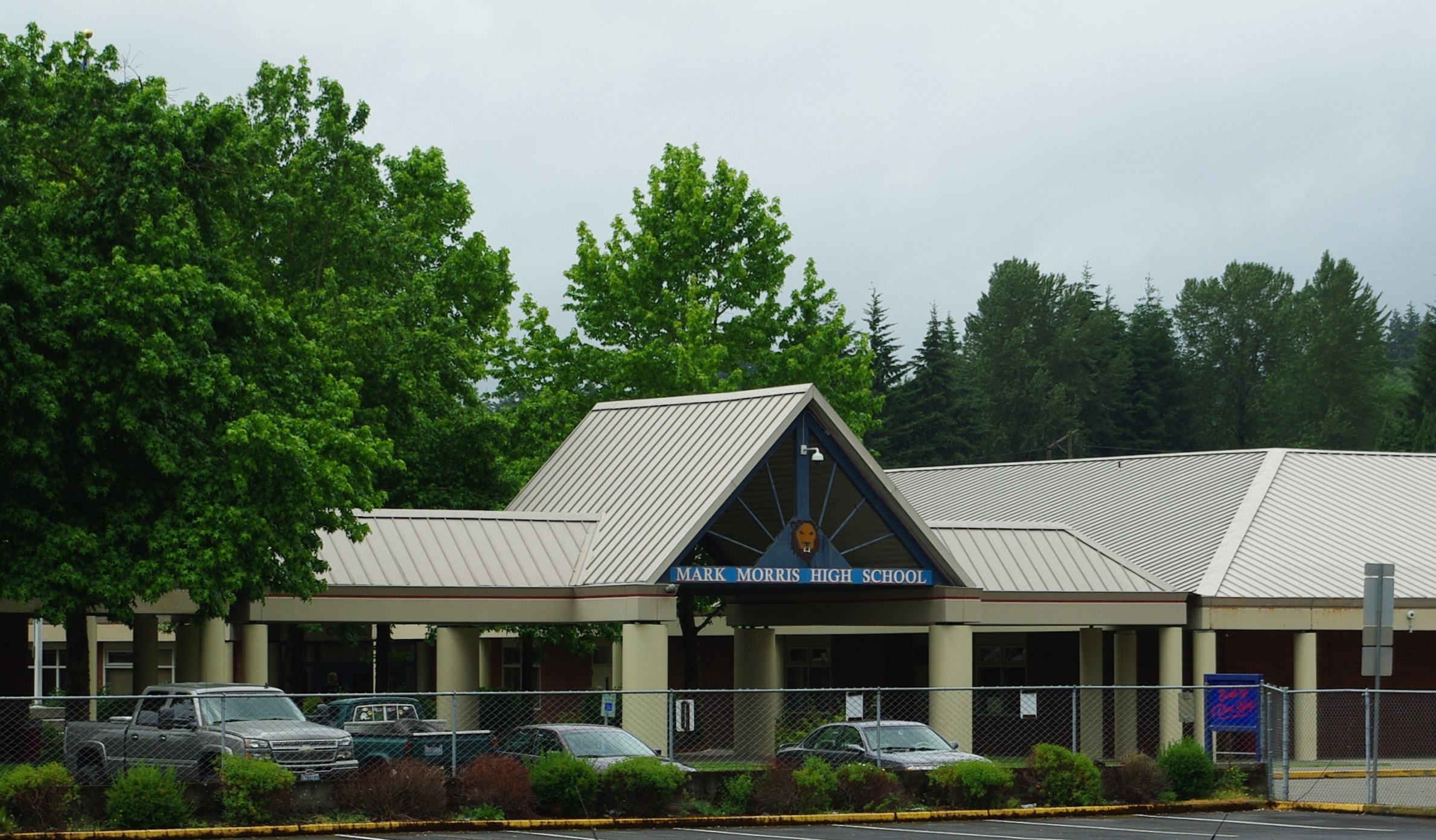
Mark Morris High School

Longview is served by Longview Public Schools, which operates eight public elementary schools (Columbia Heights, Columbia Valley Gardens, Kessler, Mint Valley, Northlake, Olympic, Robert Gray, and Saint Helens), three public middle schools (Cascade, Monticello, and Mount Solo), and two public high schools (R. A. Long and Mark Morris).

Longview is also served by two religious based schools. The St. Rose Catholic school (Archdiocese of Seattle) serves kindergarten through eighth grade. Three Rivers Christian School currently operates under two campuses: one at Northlake Baptist serving preschool through sixth grade, and on Alpha Drive, formerly Beacon Hill Elementary School which serves seventh through twelfth grades.

Lower Columbia College (LCC), based in Longview, was established in 1934.

== Media ==
The Monticello Hotel, on the Civic Circle

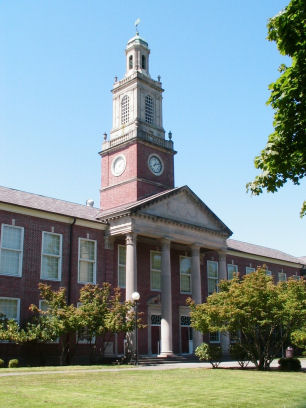
R. A. Long High School, constructed in 1927

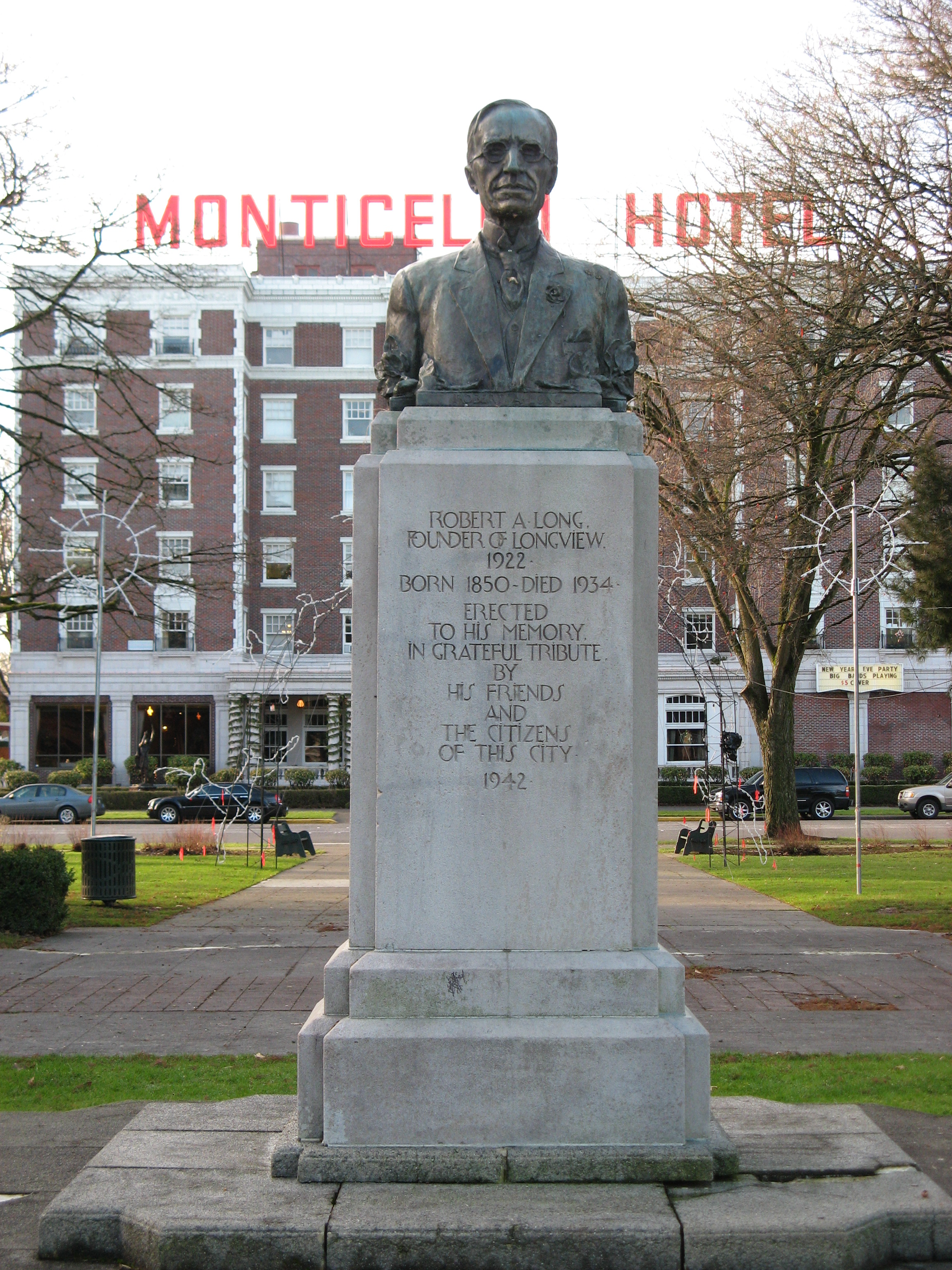
Bust of Robert A. Long, in front of the Monticello Hotel

=== Radio ===
- KEDO AM 1270 (Talk radio)
- KBAM AM 1400 (Classic country)
- KLOG AM 1490 (Classic Hits)
- KJVH FM 89.5 (Christian radio)
- KLWO FM 90.3 (Contemporary Christian)
- KLYK FM 94.5 (Hot Adult Contemporary)
- KPPK FM 98.3 "The Peak" (Adult hits)
- KRQT FM 107.1 "Rocket 107" (Classic rock)
- KUKN FM 105.5 (Country)
- K268BN FM 101.5 "The Wave" (Classic rock)

(Simulcast as KUKN-HD2 FM 105.5)

=== Newsprint ===
- The Daily News – Longview's primary newspaper, won a 1981 Pulitzer Prize for its coverage of the Mount St. Helens eruption.
- Columbia River Reader – A monthly community newspaper.
- Valley Bugler – A monthly "good news" and community events paper that grew out of the now defunct Castle Rock Advocate in 1998.

=== Television ===
- KLTV – Local public-access television cable television channel, which has its headquarters in downtown Longview, at the corner of 12th Avenue and Washington Way.

== Infrastructure ==
=== Transportation ===
Longview is on the I-5 Corridor and is served by State Route 4 and State Route 432, which connect it to nearby Kelso and Wahkiakum County. State Route 433 connects Longview to Rainier, OR over the Lewis and Clark Bridge.

The city is also served by RiverCities Transit, a local bus system that travels between Kelso and Longview. The nearest train and intercity bus station is the Kelso Multimodal Transportation Center, which is served by Amtrak's Cascades and Coast Starlight passenger trains.

==== Marine transportation ====
The Port of Longview, established in 1921, has eight marine terminals handling a wide range of cargo from windmills, pencil pitch, calcined coke, pulp bales, lumber, grain, logs and steel. The Port is 66 miles (106 km) from the Pacific Ocean.

==== Nutty Narrows Bridge ====
Longview is home to the Nutty Narrows Bridge built in 1963 by Amos Peters. For many years, it was the only bridge in the world designed and built strictly for squirrels. The bridge was built in 1963 and its purpose was to avoid squirrel casualties on the busy streets beneath.

Longview began a new annual festival, known as Squirrel Fest, in 2011. As part of the festival, a new squirrel bridge has been unveiled each year, and as of 2023, there are now seven squirrel bridges in the city. However, as of late they have stopped unveiling new squirrel bridges.

== Notable people ==
- Naomi Parker Fraley, original inspiration for Rosie the Riveter
- Bud Black, manager of the Colorado Rockies
- Steve De Jarnatt, director of cult films Miracle Mile and Cherry 2000
- James Phillip Fleming, recipient of the Medal of Honor for heroic action during the Vietnam War, 1968
- David Korten, author of When Corporations Rule the World
- Trevor May, Oakland Athletics, pitcher
- Hal Riney, American advertising executive inducted into the Advertising Hall of Fame in 2001
- Sid Snyder, Washington state legislator and businessman
- Rick Sweet, Louisville Bats Minor League Baseball manager
- Moulton Taylor, inventor of the Aerocar, the first practical flying automobile
- Brian Thompson, actor known for his work in action films and television series
- Kristen Waggoner, president, CEO, and general counsel of Alliance Defending Freedom since 2022
- David Walden, computer scientist who contributed to ARPANET
- Bob Williams, former Washington state representative, founder of the Freedom Foundation

== In popular culture ==
The Green Day song "Longview" from their album Dookie is named after the town.

== Sister cities ==
Longview has one sister city:

- Wakō, Saitama, Japan

== See also ==
- PeaceHealth St. John Medical Center
- Cowlitz County Deserves Better
