= Mark Morris High School =

Location
- 1602 Mark Morris Court; Longview, Washington 98632; United States; 46°08′41″N 122°56′10″W

Information
- Type: Public secondary
- Motto: "Roar With The Pride"
- Established: 1957
- School district: Longview Public Schools
- Principal: Aaron Whitright
- Teaching staff: 43.92 (FTE)
- Grades: 9–12
- Enrollment: 923 (2023–2024)
- Student to teacher ratio: 21.02
- Colors: Red and Columbia blue
- Nickname: Monarchs
- Rival: R.A. Long High School
- Yearbook: Almonarch
- Website: markmorris.longviewschools.com//

Mark Morris High School is a public high school in Longview, Washington, United States, for grades nine through twelve. In the 2023-2024 school year, it had an enrollment of 923 students. The school was built in 1957 and is a part of the Longview Public School District.

== Notable alumni ==
- Bud Black – former Major League Baseball pitcher and current Colorado Rockies manager
- Doug Christie – Current Head Coach of the Sacramento Kings, former professional basketball player, retired with the Los Angeles Clippers
- Robin Raphel - former United States ambassador to Tunisia
- Lisa Sari – soccer midfielder who last played for the Los Angeles Sol of Women's Professional Soccer; coaches FC Portland; her jersey still hangs in the main hallway at Mark Morris
- Trevor Smith – state champion wrestler; NJCAA All-American wrestler; professional mixed martial artist currently competing in the UFC's Middleweight Division
- Rick Sweet – former Major League Baseball catcher and current manager of the Colorado Springs Sky Sox
- Brian Thompson – actor, known for his work in action films and television series; Class of 77
