= When Corporations Rule the World =

1995 book by David Korten

- Author: David Korten
- Language: English
- Publisher: Kumarian Press
- Publication date: 1995
- ISBN: 1-887208-00-3
- OCLC: 32508180
- Dewey Decimal: 322/.3 20
- LC Class: HD2326 .K647 1995

When Corporations Rule the World is a 1995 non-fiction book by David Korten. Korten examines the evolution of corporations in the United States and argues that "corporate libertarians" have "twisted" the ideas of Adam Smith's view of the role of private companies.

Korten critiques current methods of economic development led by the Bretton Woods institutions and asserts his desire to rebalance the power of multinational corporations with concern for environmental sustainability and what he terms "people-centered development". He advocates a 50% tax on advertising.

Korten criticises consumerism, market deregulation, free trade, privatization and what he sees as the global consolidation of corporate power. Above all he rejects any focus on money as the purpose of economic life. His prescriptions include excluding corporations from political participation, increased state and global control of international corporations and finance, rendering financial speculation unprofitable and creating local economies that rely on local resources, rather than international trade.

== Responses ==
In a review of the book in Left Business Observer #71 in January 1996, Doug Henwood observed:

[Korten] offers a vision of "a market economy composed primarily, though not exclusively, of family enterprises, small-scale co-ops, worker-owned firms, and neighborhood and municipal corporations." Much of this is desirable. But it would be impossible to run a complex economy on this scale only; it's easy to imagine furniture being made this way, but not trains and computers. If Korten means to do away with trains and computers, he should tell us.
