= Captain Calvin and Pamela Hale House =

Historic house in Washington, United States

- Calvin and Pamela Hale House
- U.S. National Register of Historic Places
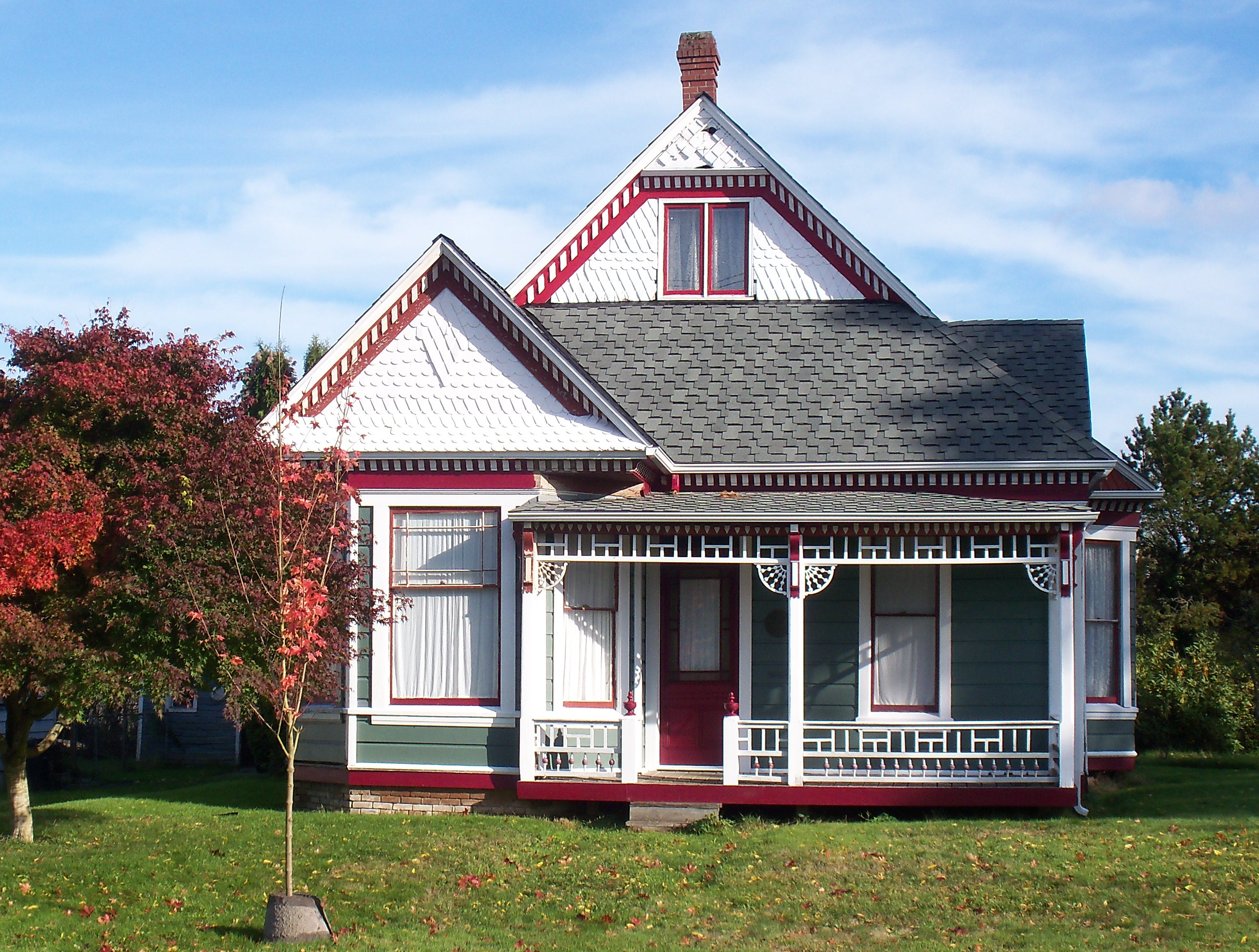
- Location: 902 Tullis St. NE; Olympia, Washington
- Coordinates: 47°3′7″N 122°53′0″W
- Built: 1882
- Architectural style: Queen Anne
- NRHP reference No.: 84003632
- Added to NRHP: January 12, 1984

The Hale House, also known as the Hale Residence, is located at 902 Tullis St, NE Olympia, Washington. The house is an American Queen Anne style Cottage and was built in 1882 for Captain Calvin Henry Hale and Pamela Case Hale. The house was placed on the National Register of Historic Places January 12, 1984.

== History ==
The Hales, in 1882, had their house on Tullis Street built. Captain Hale was only able to enjoy the house for five years. He died on August 12, 1887.

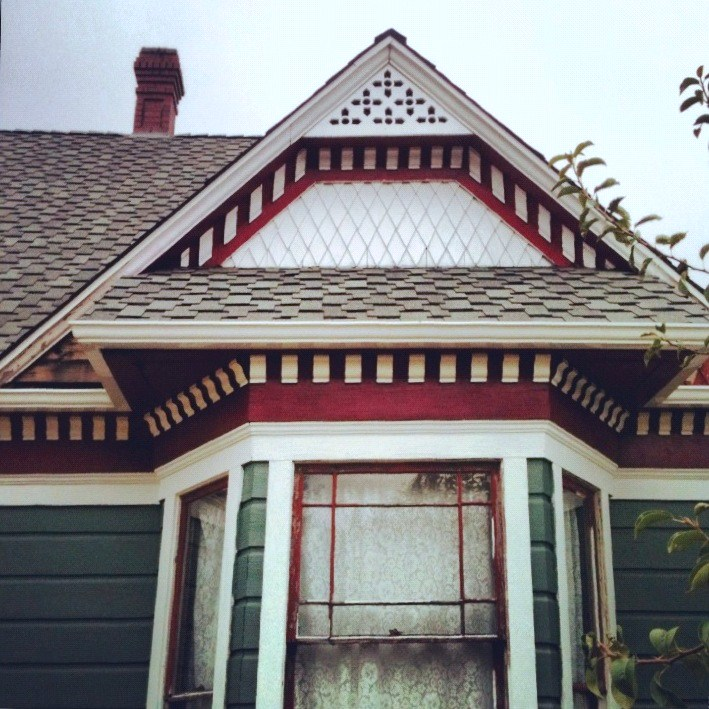
Bay window, 2012

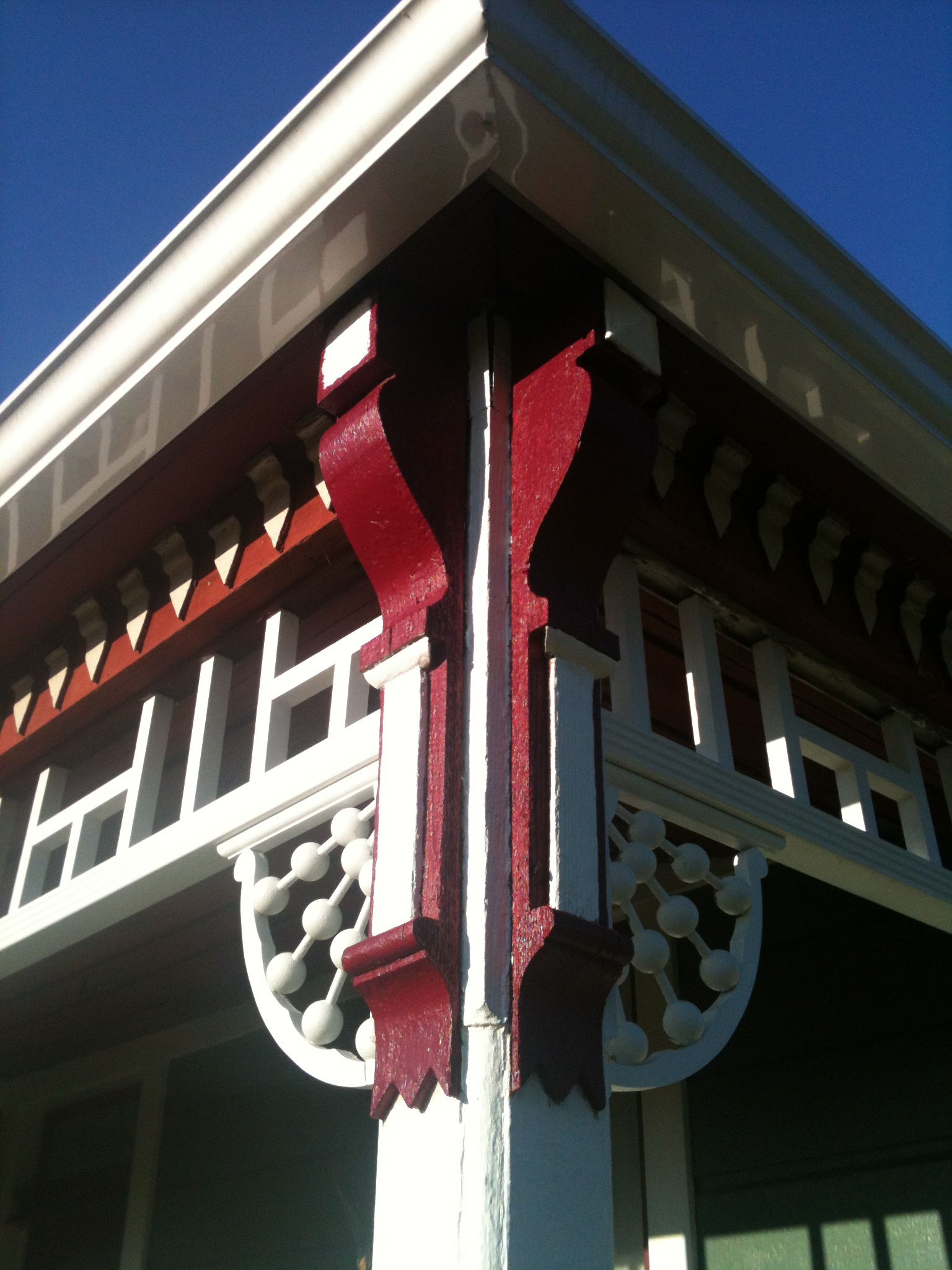
Porch, 2012

== See also ==
- History of Olympia, Washington
- History of Washington State
- Queen Anne style architecture
- Daniel R. Bigelow House
- Bigelow Neighborhood
- National Register of Historic Places listings in Thurston County, Washington
