= Calvin Henry Hale =

American settler in the Washington Territory

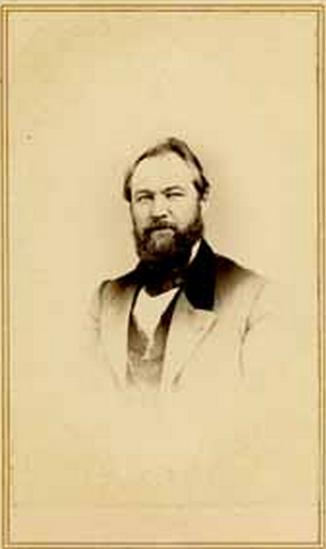
Captain Calvin Hale

Calvin Henry Hale (June 22, 1818 – August 12, 1887) was an American settler in the Washington Territory who became involved in territorial government. In 1862 he was appointed Superintendent of Indian Affairs in the territory which included Washington and Idaho.

== Early life ==
Calvin Henry Hale was born June 22, 1818, in Norridgewock, Somerset County, Maine, to father Ebenezer Hale (1784–1861) and mother Ann Dinsmore (1788–1861).

Hale was a master seaman and boat builder. He married Waitstill Look in about 1841. According to the 1850 census, they lived in Lincolnville, Waldo County, Maine with two sons: Henry Calvin, born September 25, 1842, and Samuel Look, born in 1846. They had a daughter, Nancy A., born in late 1850, after the census was taken.

== In Washington ==
In 1851 Hale decided to head west with his wife and three young children, but not overland. Instead they traveled by ship around Cape Horn to Olympia. There he obtained a 320-acre donation land claim in north east Olympia. In all of the federal, state and territorial censuses from 1860 on, Hale was listed as a farmer (or agriculturist or horticulturist).

In Maine he was a legislator and became active in local affairs soon after his arrival in Olympia. In 1852 he attended the Monticello Convention (petitioning for a new territory), and served in the first territorial legislature. At one time, he was the Thurston County Coroner and was on the Olympia City Council. He also helped establish the Puget Sound Wesleyan Institute, the first school of higher education in the state. Hale was also on the first Board of Regents of the University of Washington.

In 1862, Hale was appointed by President Abraham Lincoln to the post of Superintendent of Indian Affairs for the Washington and Idaho Territories. In this capacity he was involved in the Treaty of 1863 with the Nez Perce, among many other treaties.

Waitstill died December 4, 1870, and had been bedridden during the last six years of her life, having injured her spine in a fall. On August 17, 1872, Hale married Pamela Case Hale. She brought her son, Charles Case, to the marriage. Pamela was a school teacher, a businesswoman and a founding member of the Woman's Club of Olympia. In 1882, she became the first woman ever elected as Thurston County's Superintendent of Public Schools.

Hale lived in a house on Tullis Street for five years until his death August 12, 1887.

== See also ==
- History of Olympia, Washington
- History of Washington State
- Queen Anne style architecture
- Daniel R. Bigelow House
- Bigelow Neighborhood
- National Register of Historic Places listings in Thurston County, Washington
