= Kelso, Washington =

- City
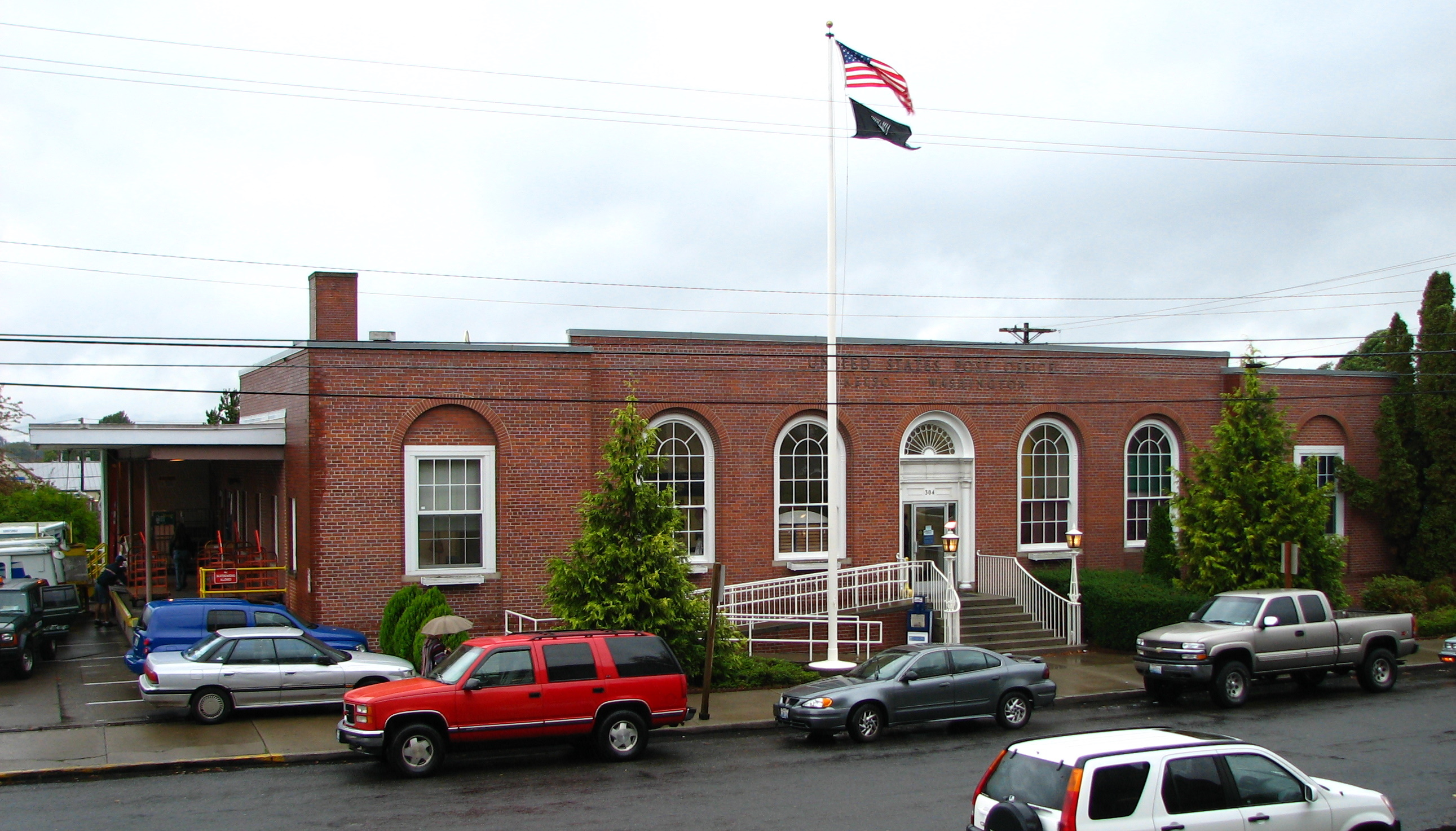
- Main Post Office in Kelso in 2009
- Motto: "City of Friendly People"
- Interactive map of Kelso, Washington
- Coordinates: 46°07′31″N 122°53′12″W
- Country: United States
- State: Washington
- County: Cowlitz
- Platted: 1884

Government
  - Type: Council-manager
  - City manager: Andrew O. Hamilton
  - Mayor: Veryl Anderson

Area
  - Total: 8.84 sq mi (22.89 km^{2})
  - Land: 8.14 sq mi (21.07 km^{2})
  - Water: 0.70 sq mi (1.82 km^{2})
- Elevation: 13 ft (4.0 m)

Population (2020)
  - Total: 12,720
  - Density: 1,526.3/sq mi (589.32/km^{2})
- Time zone: UTC-8 (Pacific (PST))
  - Summer (DST): UTC-7 (PDT)
- ZIP code: 98626
- Area code: 360
- FIPS code: 53-35065
- GNIS feature ID: 2410174
- Website: kelso.gov

Kelso is a city in and the county seat of Cowlitz County, Washington, United States. At the 2020 census, the population was 12,720. Kelso is part of the Longview, Washington Metropolitan statistical area, which has a population of 110,730. Kelso shares its long western border with Longview. It is near Mount St. Helens.

== History ==
The earliest known inhabitants of the area were the Cowlitz people, part of the Sahaptin and Salish people. About 6,000 Cowlitz were living in longhouses in villages along the Cowlitz River in 1855. The Cowlitz Tribe met with others at the Chehalis River Treaty Council in 1855 and declined to sign a treaty with the Washington Territory which would have required them to move away to a reservation. Many remained in the area until the tribe received federal recognition: its current headquarters is in nearby Longview.

Kelso was founded by Peter W. Crawford, a Scottish surveyor, who, in 1847, took up the first donation land claim on the lower Cowlitz River. Crawford platted a townsite which he named after his home town of Kelso, Scotland. The original plat was dated and filed in October 1884. It became incorporated in 1889.

In its early days, Kelso obtained the nickname "Little Chicago" as it became famous for its large number of taverns and brothels that catered to local loggers. On weekends, trainloads of loggers would come into town from the surrounding region looking for women, liquor, gambling and fights. The FBI finally forced the mayor to shut them down in the 1950s, with the last tavern/brothel closing in the mid-1960s. The economy continues to be based largely on wood products.

In the late 19th century and into the first part of the 20th century, Kelso was the center for commercial smelt fishing on the Cowlitz River. In 1910, according to the Oregonian Newspaper, 5,000 tons of fish were caught. The Kelso Chamber of Commerce created the slogan in 1956 and became known as the Smelt Capital of the World. The Cowlitz River has historically had heavy runs of smelt and were shipped to markets around the country. Smelt numbers have declined significantly in the past several decades possibly due to overharvesting, global climate change and habitat loss. By 2010, the Cowlitz was the last U.S. watershed with smelt runs, and after the Cowlitz tribe's advocacy, the fish were labeled with a threatened status in 2010.

The Allen Street Bridge disaster occurred on January 3, 1923, in Kelso. As of 2024, the event is recognized as the deadliest bridge disaster in the state. The wooden drawbridge collapsed under a combination of high, rushing waters of the Cowlitz River, a log jam, and the poor condition of the overpass. The disaster happened during the end of work day, and 17 people were formally listed as having died due to the event. Also that year, Robert Alexander Long founded the lumber company town of Longview across the Cowlitz River from Kelso. Kelso wanted both towns to merge, but when Long declined, a rivalry grew between them.

In 1941, Kelso obtained the Kelso-Longview Regional Airport. Moulton Taylor, who grew up in Kelso, invented some of the first flying cars and lived nearby in Longview. In 1947, two military officers who were investigating the Maury Island incident (a UFO hoax) died when their plane crashed in southeast Kelso. In 1966, Vern Salsbury built a 600-foot wooden track for a skateboard park in West Kelso, creating the first skateboard park in the U.S. It closed two years later when its admission was not enough to cover its costs.

On May 18, 1980, being only 24 miles (39 km) away, Kelso residents experienced the shock wave caused by the eruption of Mount St. Helens. Called the largest volcanic eruption in historic times in the contiguous United States, Kelso received large amounts of volcanic ash through the air and from the massive mudflow caused by the eruption transported by the Toutle and Cowlitz Rivers. Many areas of the city, including the Three Rivers Golf Course are built on volcanic ash dredged from the Cowlitz River by inmates in state custody and volunteers.

In March 1998, the Aldercrest-Banyon landslide began shifting the foundations of 64 homes and local infrastructure in the east Kelso neighborhood of Aldercrest. Eventually, 129 houses were destroyed by this slow-moving landslide. Investigation showed that these houses had been built on top of an ancient active landslide area, and three straight years of higher-than-average rains set the earth into motion. In October 1998, President Bill Clinton declared this slide a federal disaster. It was the second worst landslide disaster (in cost) in the United States, following the 1956 Portuguese Bend Landslide on Palos Verdes Hills in Southern California. This disaster at Aldercrest led to stricter city zoning ordinances and oversight over geological surveys.

== Geography ==
Kelso is mostly situated on the east side of the Cowlitz River near the Columbia River, opposite from its twin city of Longview on the west bank. It includes a small section west of the river, West Kelso. It is located on Interstate 5 approximately 48 miles (77 km) north of Portland, Oregon, and 125 miles (201 km) south of Seattle.

According to the United States Census Bureau, the city has a total area of 8.50 square miles (22.01 km^{2}), of which 8.14 square miles (21.08 km^{2}) is land and 0.36 square miles (0.93 km^{2}) is water.

The Columbia, Cowlitz, and Coweeman rivers were used as part of a historical transportation route from Portland, Oregon, to the Puget Sound. Cowlitz steamboats were used as a mode of transportation until 1918.

=== Climate ===
Climate data for Southwest Washington Regional Airport
Month	Jan	Feb	Mar	Apr	May	Jun	Jul	Aug	Sep	Oct	Nov	Dec	Year
Record high °F (°C)	61 (16)	70 (21)	77 (25)	86 (30)	99 (37)	110 (43)	106 (41)	99 (37)	94 (34)	86 (30)	69 (21)	63 (17)	110 (43)
Mean daily maximum °F (°C)	41.2 (5.1)	48.1 (8.9)	51.6 (10.9)	61.5 (16.4)	66.3 (19.1)	70.6 (21.4)	76.3 (24.6)	76.5 (24.7)	74.9 (23.8)	61.9 (16.6)	52.5 (11.4)	46.5 (8.1)	60.7 (15.9)
Mean daily minimum °F (°C)	28.9 (−1.7)	33.2 (0.7)	34.9 (1.6)	36.8 (2.7)	42.1 (5.6)	47.2 (8.4)	50.0 (10.0)	50.6 (10.3)	46.0 (7.8)	40.3 (4.6)	36.7 (2.6)	35.4 (1.9)	40.2 (4.5)
Record low °F (°C)	−1 (−18)	2 (−17)	18 (−8)	27 (−3)	30 (−1)	35 (2)	39 (4)	37 (3)	32 (0)	21 (−6)	13 (−11)	16 (−9)	−1 (−18)
Average precipitation inches (mm)	6.27 (159)	5.47 (139)	5.82 (148)	2.48 (63)	2.16 (55)	1.83 (46)	0.50 (13)	0.85 (22)	1.04 (26)	4.28 (109)	5.59 (142)	6.57 (167)	42.87 (1,089)
Average snowfall inches (cm)	10.8 (27)	3.7 (9.4)	3.4 (8.6)	0.0 (0.0)	0.0 (0.0)	0.0 (0.0)	0.0 (0.0)	0.0 (0.0)	0.0 (0.0)	0.0 (0.0)	0.0 (0.0)	0.6 (1.5)	18.6 (47)
Source: Western Regional Climate Center

=== Neighborhoods ===
- Aldercrest
- Butler Acres
- Davis Terrace
- East Kelso
- Hilltop
- Lexington
- Mt. Brynion
- Mt Pleasant
- North Kelso
- Old Kelso Hill
- Rose Valley
- South Kelso
- West Kelso

== Demographics ==
Historical population
Census	Pop.	Note	%±
1890	354		—
1900	694		96.0%
1910	2,039		193.8%
1920	2,228		9.3%
1930	6,260		181.0%
1940	6,749		7.8%
1950	7,345		8.8%
1960	8,379		14.1%
1970	10,296		22.9%
1980	11,129		8.1%
1990	11,820		6.2%
2000	11,895		0.6%
2010	11,925		0.3%
2020	12,720		6.7%
U.S. Decennial Census; 2020 Census

=== 2020 census ===
As of the 2020 census, Kelso had a population of 12,720. The median age was 35.3 years. 25.6% of residents were under the age of 18 and 14.5% were 65 years of age or older. For every 100 females there were 97.5 males, and for every 100 females age 18 and over there were 94.3 males age 18 and over.

94.6% of residents lived in urban areas, while 5.4% lived in rural areas.

There were 4,947 households in Kelso, of which 33.0% had children under the age of 18 living in them. Of all households, 36.5% were married-couple households, 22.1% were households with a male householder and no spouse or partner present, and 30.0% were households with a female householder and no spouse or partner present. About 30.4% of all households were made up of individuals and 11.9% had someone living alone who was 65 years of age or older.

There were 5,217 housing units, of which 5.2% were vacant. The homeowner vacancy rate was 0.8% and the rental vacancy rate was 5.2%.

Racial composition as of the 2020 census
Race	Number	Percent
White	9,782	76.9%
Black or African American	118	0.9%
American Indian and Alaska Native	271	2.1%
Asian	163	1.3%
Native Hawaiian and Other Pacific Islander	257	2.0%
Some other race	781	6.1%
Two or more races	1,348	10.6%
Hispanic or Latino (of any race)	1,704	13.4%

=== 2010 census ===
As of the 2010 census, there were 11,925 people, 4,720 households, and 2,949 families residing in the city. The population density was 1,465.0 inhabitants per square mile (565.6/km^{2}). There were 5,139 housing units at an average density of 631.3 per square mile (243.7/km^{2}). The racial makeup of the city was 85.2% White, 0.8% African American, 2.1% Native American, 1.6% Asian, 0.1% Pacific Islander, 5.1% from other races, and 5.1% from two or more races. Hispanic or Latino of any race were 11.3% of the population.

There were 4,720 households, of which 34.9% had children under the age of 18 living with them, 37.9% were married couples living together, 17.4% had a female householder with no husband present, 7.2% had a male householder with no wife present, and 37.5% were non-families. 28.8% of all households were made up of individuals, and 9.5% had someone living alone who was 65 years of age or older. The average household size was 2.52 and the average family size was 3.05.

The median age in the city was 34.6 years. 26.3% of residents were under the age of 18; 10.3% were between the ages of 18 and 24; 26.7% were from 25 to 44; 24.8% were from 45 to 64; and 11.7% were 65 years of age or older. The gender makeup of the city was 48.8% male and 51.2% female.

=== 2000 census ===
As of the 2000 census, there were 11,895 people, 4,616 households, and 2,991 families residing in the city. The population density was 1,471.6 people per square mile (568.4/km^{2}). There were 5,067 housing units at an average density of 626.9 per square mile (242.1/km^{2}). The racial makeup of the city was 90.14% White, 0.82% African American, 2.05% Native American, 0.94% Asian, 0.21% Pacific Islander, 3.12% from other races, and 2.72% from two or more races. Hispanic or Latino of any race were 6.93% of the population. 18.1% were of German, 9.3% Irish, 9.0% English, 7.7% American and 6.4% Norwegian ancestry.

There were 4,616 households, out of which 33.6% had children under the age of 18 living with them, 43.0% were married couples living together, 15.9% had a female householder with no husband present, and 35.2% were non-families. 28.3% of all households were made up of individuals, and 10.5% had someone living alone who was 65 years of age or older. The average household size was 2.52 and the average family size was 3.05.

In the city, the age distribution of the population shows 28.3% under the age of 18, 10.5% from 18 to 24, 29.0% from 25 to 44, 19.8% from 45 to 64, and 12.3% who were 65 years of age or older. The median age was 33 years. For every 100 females, there were 99.6 males. For every 100 females age 18 and over, there were 98.8 males.

The median income for a household in the city was $29,722, and the median income for a family was $36,784. Males had a median income of $36,271 versus $23,750 for females. The per capita income for the city was $15,162. About 16.4% of families and 19.8% of the population were below the poverty line, including 25.1% of those under age 18 and 11.2% of those age 65 or over.

== Economy ==
As of 2024, Kelso had a per capita income of $57,947 and an unemployment rate of 5.3%; the top employers were:

Rank	Employer	Employees in 2024	Employees in 2015	2024 Share	2015 Share
1	PeaceHealth St. John Medical Center	▼1,740	1,919	▼4.60%	4.80%
2	Weyerhaeuser	▼1,600	2,500	▼4.23%	6.20%
3	Longview Fibre / Westrock	▼975	1,140	▼2.58%	2.80%
4	Longview School District	▲813	735	▲2.15%	1.80%
5	Foster Farms	▲787	687	▲2.08%	1.70%
6	Kelso School District	▲734	637	▲1.94%	1.60%
7	Cowlitz County	▲619	519	▲1.64%	1.30%
8	Nippon Dynawave Packaging	▲539	-	▲1.43%	-
9	Norpac	▲500	-	▲1.32%	-
10	Lower Columbia College	▲434	-	▲1.15%	-

== Arts and culture ==
The city is home to several buildings listed on the National Register of Historic Places listings in Cowlitz County, Washington, including the Adam Catlin House, the Nat Smith House, and the Kelso U.S. Post Office

== Parks and recreation ==
Within the city limits, there are eleven city parks: Tam O'Shanter Park, Heerensperger Field, Rister Stadium, Catlin, Rotary Spray Park, Kelso Veterans Park, Lads & Lassies Park, Rhododendron Gardens, Rotary Park, Rotary Skate Park, Scot Hollow Park and Kelso Senior Center.

The largest park is Tam O' Shanter Park, a multi-use park comprising 38 acres (150,000 m^{2}) along the Coweeman River. The facilities include multipurpose fields for soccer, three girls fastpitch softball fields, one Babe Ruth field, five Cal Ripken baseball fields, and three basketball courts. The park hosts the annual Kelso Hilander Festival which includes Scottish Highland games. The park is named after a Scottish bonnet, the Tam o' shanter.

=== Sports ===
The Cowlitz Black Bears play in the West Coast League, an independent summer baseball league with teams from Washington, Oregon, and British Columbia. The team plays at David Story Field on the Lower Columbia College campus in neighboring Longview.

== Government ==
Kelso operates under a city charter and is classified as a council–manager government. The city council has 7 members elected by residents, from which a mayor is chosen by its members every 2 years. Council positions are filled on an at-large basis and are held for 4 years.

As of July 2025, the mayor is Veryl Anderson.

The council also selects a city manager; former Kelso police chief Andrew O. Hamilton was hired as city manager in 2019 after the departure of Steve Taylor.

== Education ==
The Kelso School District manages public schools in the city and surrounding areas and has an enrollment of 4,715 students. It has three high schools, including Kelso High School, two middle schools, and seven elementary schools.

== Media ==
Kelso has four FM (KUKN, K268BN, KLOG and KTJC) and one AM (KLOG) radio stations licensed in the city. Kelso is provided with cable television from nearby Longview.

Kelso's primary newspaper is The Daily News, which won a 1981 Pulitzer Prize for its coverage of the St. Helens eruption.

== Infrastructure ==
Interstate 5 runs through Kelso. Two highways, State Route 4 and State Route 432, connect Kelso to Longview via crossings of the Cowlitz River.

Amtrak, the national passenger rail system, provides service to the twin cities of Kelso-Longview. The Amtrak station is located in the Kelso Multimodal Transportation Center along the Cowlitz River. The cities of Kelso and Longview are served by RiverCities Transit. Kelso is also served by Greyhound Bus Lines, which provides intercity bus service at the Kelso Multimodal Transportation Center.

Kelso is served by Southwest Washington Regional Airport, formerly known as Kelso-Longview Regional Airport.

== Notable people ==
- Jeff Bailey, former baseball player
- Calvin S. Barlow, former politician
- Dolores Erickson, fashion model
- Jim Deming, former football coach
- Colin Kelly, football player
- Mary Klicka, dietician
- Vernon J. Kondra - Retired Air Force Lieutenant General
- Sharry Konopski, model and actress
- Trevor May, former baseball player
- Tommy Lloyd, basketball coach
- Ed Negre, racecar driver
- Brian O'Connor, musician
- Forrest Phelps, former politician
- Elmer Ramsey, orchestra conductor
- David Richie, former football player
- Buddy Ross, record producer
- Jason Schmidt, former baseball player
- Sid Snyder, state legislator
- Martin Stickles, serial killer
- Connor Trinneer, actor

== Sister cities ==
Kelso has the two sister cities:

- Kelso, Scotland
- Makinohara, Japan

== See also ==
- Impact of the 2019–20 coronavirus pandemic on the meat industry in the United States
