= Woman's Club of Olympia =

- Woman's Club
- U.S. National Register of Historic Places
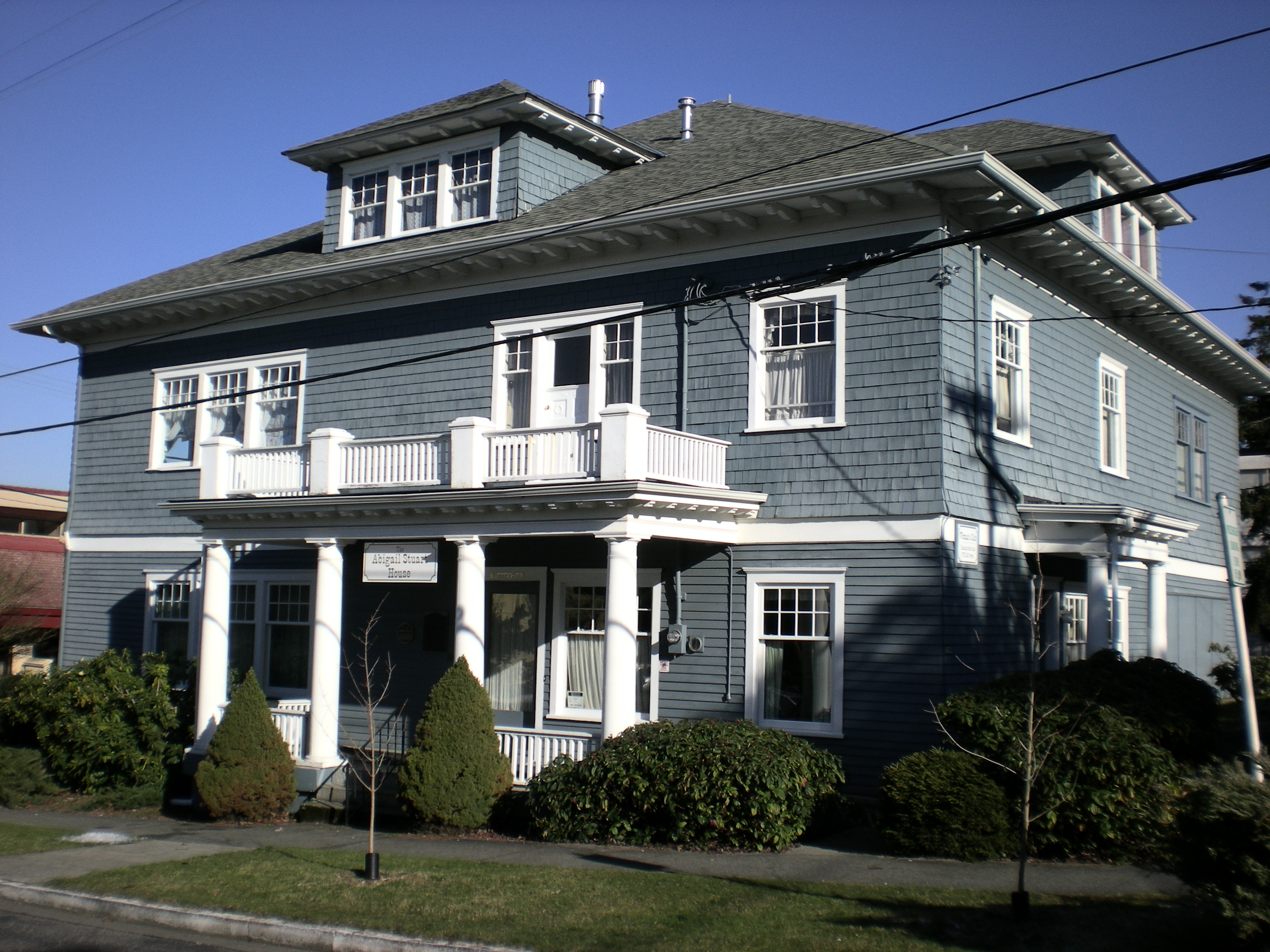

- Location within Washington (state) Location within the United States
- Location: 1002 Washington Street SE, Olympia, Washington
- Coordinates: 47.039722°N 122.898056°W
- Built: 1908
- NRHP reference No.: 79002565
- Added to NRHP: June 15, 1979

The Woman's Club of Olympia was founded in Olympia, Washington, United States, in 1883. It is one of the oldest woman's club on the West Coast. Founding members included Mehitable Elder, Pamela Case Hale, Mary Hartsock, Janet Moore, Phebe Moore, Mary Shelton, Ella Stork, Abbie Howard Hunt Stuart, and Sarah E. Whitney. Its first president, Mrs. A.H.H. (Abbie Howard Hunt) Stewart, a college graduate and a veteran of the Women's Club in Boston, was a "driving force" in the club's organization and was known as the "Mother of Women's Clubs" for having founded other clubs, too.

Of note was the club's early operation of Olympia's only library facility from 1896–1909 and subsequent assistance obtaining a Carnegie Library grant for a public library. A grant of $25,000 was obtained in 1903, which like other Carnegie grants included requirements for the local community to meet, and led to the building in 1914 of the Olympia Public Library. The library had 900 books when it was turned over to the city to operate in 1909.

As of 2018 the club is still active. It is a member of the General Federation of Women's Clubs.

== Building ==
The Woman's Club of Olympia was built in 1908. It replaced the original clubhouse purchased in 1900 that was destroyed by fire in 1907. Members raised $2,500 for the new clubhouse. The current building was listed on the National Register of Historic Places in 1979 as Woman's Club. It is a three-story hipped roof building, 53 by 55 feet (16 m × 17 m) in plan. It is also known as the Abigail Stuart House.
