= Jim Deming =

American football coach (1924–2006)

Biographical details
- Born: July 15, 1924; Kelso, Washington, U.S.
- Died: May 25, 2006 (aged 81); Helena, Montana, U.S.
- Education: Montana

Coaching career (HC unless noted)

Football
- 1948–1950: Belt HS (MT)
- 1951–1952: Choteau HS (MT)
- 1953–1957: Anaconda Central HS (MT)
- 1958: Carroll (MT)
- 1961–1965: Jesuit HS (OR)
- 1966–1968: Helena HS (MT)
- 1969: Libby HS (MT)
- 1970–1982: Helena HS (MT)

Basketball
- 1953–1958: Anaconda Central HS (MT)

Head coaching record
- Overall: 2–6 (college football)

Cecil Carwin "Jim" Deming (July 15, 1924 – May 25, 2006) was an American football coach. He served as the head football coach at Carroll College in Helena, Montana in 1958.

== Early years and education ==
Deming graduated from Trout Lake School in 1941. He served in the United States Navy for four years during World War II. He attended the Montana State School of Mines—now known as Montana Tech of the University of Montana—and graduated from the University of Montana in Missoula in 1948.

== Head coaching record ==
=== College football ===
Year	Team	Overall	Conference	Standing	Bowl/playoffs
Carroll Fighting Saints (Montana Collegiate Conference) (1958)
1958	Carroll	2–6	1–4	5th	
Carroll:		2–6	1–4		
Total:		2–6			
