= KKLS =

KKLS may refer to:

- KKLS (AM), a radio station (920 AM) licensed to Rapid City, South Dakota, United States
- KKLS-FM, a radio station (104.7 FM) licensed to Sioux Falls, South Dakota, United States
- Southwest Washington Regional Airport (ICAO airport code: KKLS), formerly known as Kelso-Longview Regional Airport
