= KLOG =

- Kelso, Washington; United States
- Broadcast area: Southwestern Washington, Northwestern Oregon
- Frequency: 1490 kHz
- Branding: KLOG 100.7

Programming
- Format: Classic hits

Ownership
- Owner: Washington Interstate Broadcasting Company

History
- First air date: 1949

Technical information
- Licensing authority: FCC
- Facility ID: 70647
- Class: C
- Power: 1,000 watts unlimited
- Transmitter coordinates: 46°7′0″N 122°53′7″W
- Translator: 100.7 K264CU (Kelso)

Links
- Public license information: Public file; LMS
- Webcast: Listen live
- Website: klog.com

KLOG (1490 AM), (100.7 FM) is a radio station broadcasting a classic hits format. Licensed to Kelso, Washington, United States. The station is currently owned by Washington Interstate Broadcasting Company. The station has been broadcasting for over 60 years. They provide information, local newscasts, local sports coverage, and sponsor a large number of community events.

== Play-by-play sports ==
=== High school ===
- Kelso High School Baseball, Basketball and Football

=== College ===
- Lower Columbia College Baseball and Men's Basketball
- University of Washington Men's Basketball and Football

=== Professional ===
- Portland Trail Blazers basketball
- Seattle Mariners baseball

== History ==
On August 5, 2002 the station was sold to Washington Interstate Broadcasting Company.

On April 10, 2018, the station began simulcasting its programming on 100.7 FM and also began using the FM identity on-air.

On November 5, 2021 KLOG changed their format from sports to classic hits.
