= PeaceHealth St. John Medical Center =

Coordinates: 46.1427°N 122.9556°W

- PeaceHealth System
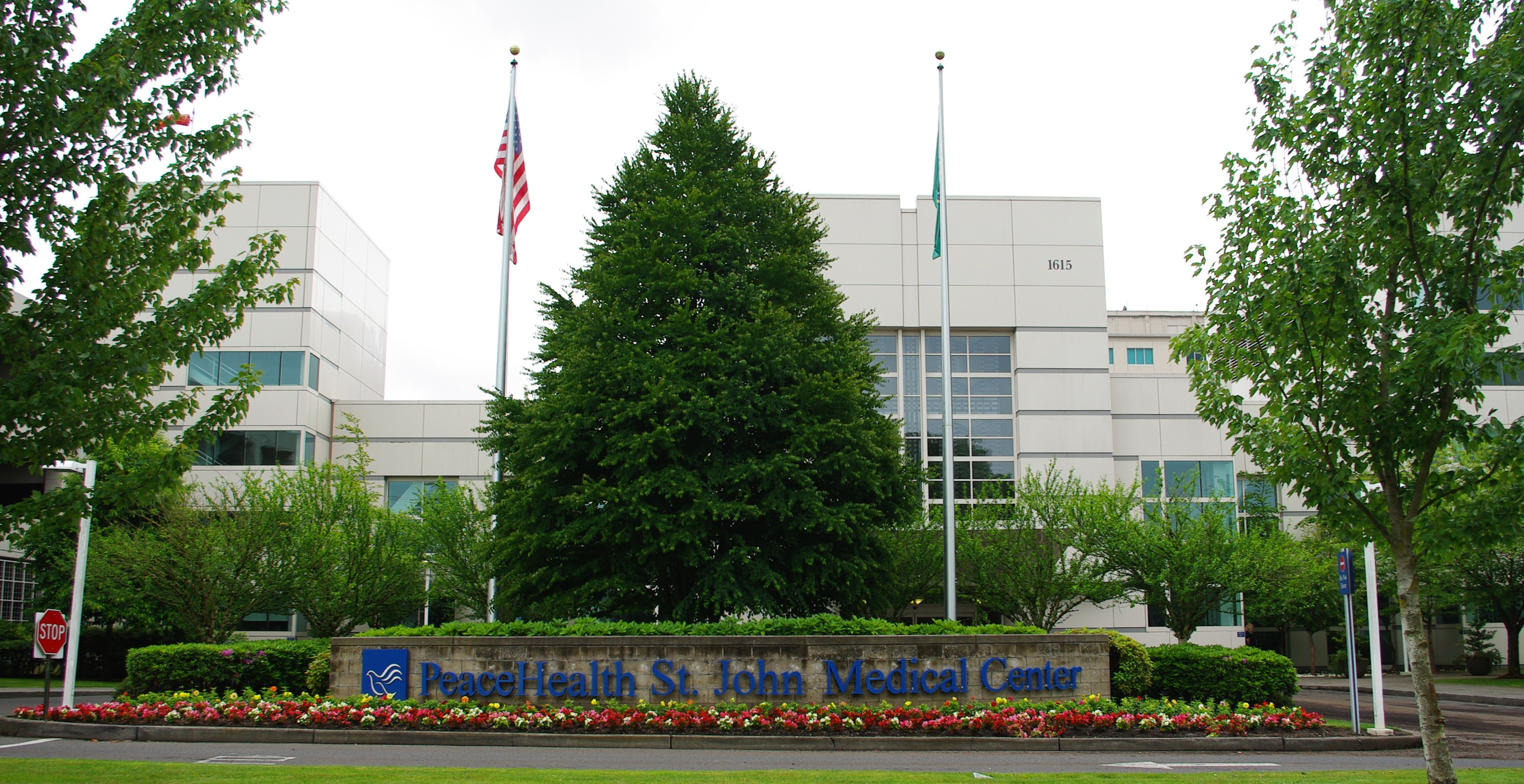
- Entrance in 2014

Geography
- Location: 1615 Delaware Street, Longview, Washington, United States

Organization
- Network: PeaceHealth

Services
- Emergency department: Level III trauma center
- Beds: 395 (licensed)

Helipads
- Helipad: Yes

Links
- Website: www.peacehealth.org/st-john-medical-center
- Lists: Hospitals in Washington state

PeaceHealth St. John Medical Center is a 256-bed hospital located in Longview, Washington. Opened in 1943, it is operated by the PeaceHealth System.

== History ==
Longview Memorial hospital was opened in 1924, but closed by 1943. In December 1943, the former hospital was purchased by the Sisters of St. Joseph of Peace for $85,000 and re-opened as St. John's Hospital. The hospital was expanded in 1952 and again in 1968 when new patient tower was added. Further expansions came in 1982, 1992, and 1999. A Life Flight Network helicopter was positioned at the hospital starting in 2008. In August 2013, the hospital laid off 30 people, bringing the total number of staff to about 1,200. For the fiscal year ending in 2015, St. John's profit totaled $1.9 million. Providence's Telestroke Network was added to the hospital in November 2016. In December 2016, the Life Flight helicopter was moved from St. John's to the Southwest Washington Regional Airport in neighboring Kelso.
