= KUKN =

- Longview, Washington; United States
- Broadcast area: Longview-Kelso
- Frequency: 105.5 MHz (HD Radio)
- Branding: Cookin' Country

Programming
- Format: Country
- Subchannels: HD2: Active rock "101.5 The Blitz"

Ownership
- Owner: Washington Interstate Broadcasting, Inc.

History
- First air date: July 7, 1968
- Former call signs: KLYK (1968–2003)
- Call sign meaning: Sounds like cookin’ (reference to branding)

Technical information
- Licensing authority: FCC
- Facility ID: 38378
- Class: A
- ERP: 700 watts
- HAAT: 262 meters (860 ft)
- Transmitter coordinates: 46°9′52.00″N 122°51′13.00″W
- Translators: 101.5 K268BN (Eufaula-Longview, relays HD2)

Links
- Public license information: Public file; LMS
- Webcast: Listen live Listen live (HD2)
- Website: kukn.com 1015theblitz.com (HD2)

KUKN (105.5 FM, "Cookin' Country") is a radio station broadcasting a country music format. Licensed to Longview, Washington, United States, the station is currently owned by Washington Interstate Broadcasting, Inc.

== KUKN-HD2 ==
KUKN-HD2 (101.5 K268BN FM, "101.5 The Blitz") is a radio station broadcasting an active rock format. It was formerly classic hits as "101.5 The Wave".

On November 5, 2021, KUKN-HD2 dropped its adult hits formats and began stunting with Christmas music as "101.5 The Sleigh". On December 26, 2021, KUKN-HD2 flipped to active rock as 101.5 The Blitz.

On May 16, 2022, KUKN-HD2, “101.5 The Blitz”, introduced its first official on air lineup. Their morning show, Mood Killers with Marconi Bologna and Eddie Barella, airs 6-10a. John Paul hosts middays 10a-3p. Pork Chop hosts afternoons 3-8p.
