= Steamboats of the Cowlitz River =

Steamboats in an American river

The Cowlitz River flows into the Columbia River at a point 68 miles from the Columbia's mouth, in southwestern Washington, United States.

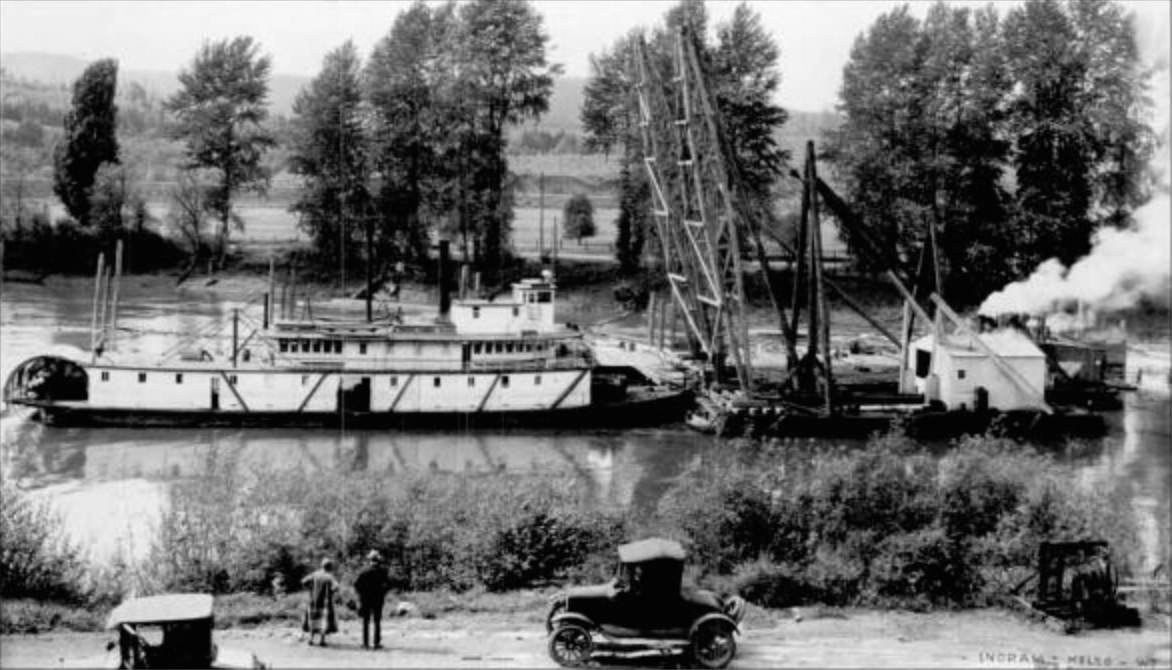
Pomona on Cowlitz River, 1925

The head of navigation, Cowlitz Landing, was about 35 east of the meeting of the Clackamas with the Columbia. Early steamboat operations on the Cowlitz were haphazard from 1858 to 1864. By the later date, the monopoly Oregon Steam Navigation Company had taken over, driving competitors out with a price war. Once O.S.N. had crushed all its competitors, the quality of service fell off. Residents of the area brought in Captain Joseph Kellogg, his brother and two sons to organize a new service on the Cowlitz. Kellogg did so with the Toledo. The Kelloggs established a new town at Cowlitz Landing, and named it Toledo after their sternwheeler.

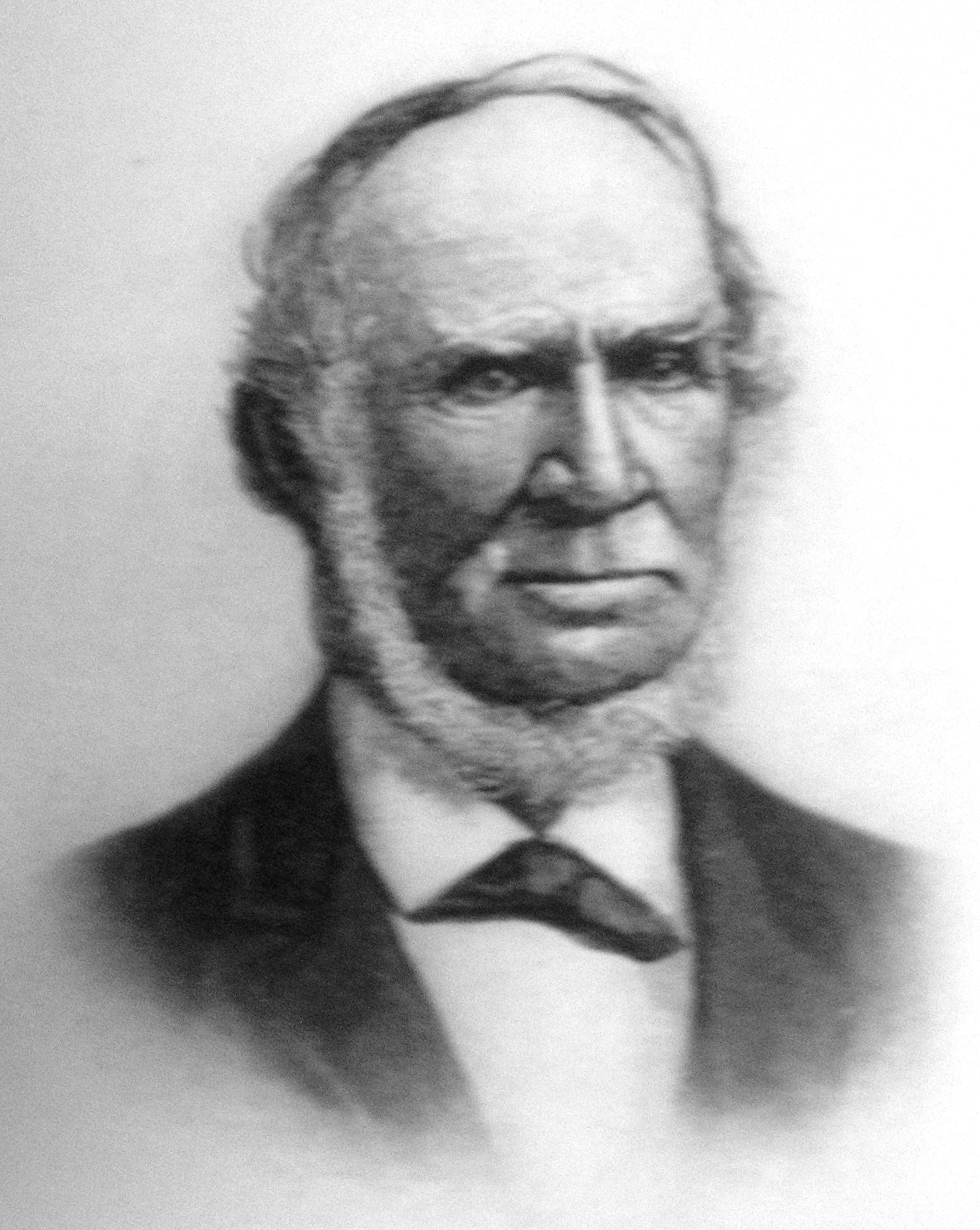
Captain Joseph Kellogg

Other boats eventually placed on the Cowlitz run were Joseph Kellogg, Northwest, and Chester. Chester in particular, launched in 1897, was described as "the ultimate in shallow-draft steamboating. She worked upstream from Kelso, where she connected with larger river boats, and could run in water only a foot deep. There was not a need for docks, customers just drove their wagons into the river to load or unload. The design was widely copied for use in Alaska and the Yukon for shallow-draft boats in the gold rush.

Railroad and highway competition ended steamboat service on the Cowlitz in 1918.

== See also ==
- Steamboats of the Columbia River
