= Abbie Howard Hunt Stuart =

American suffragist and businesswoman

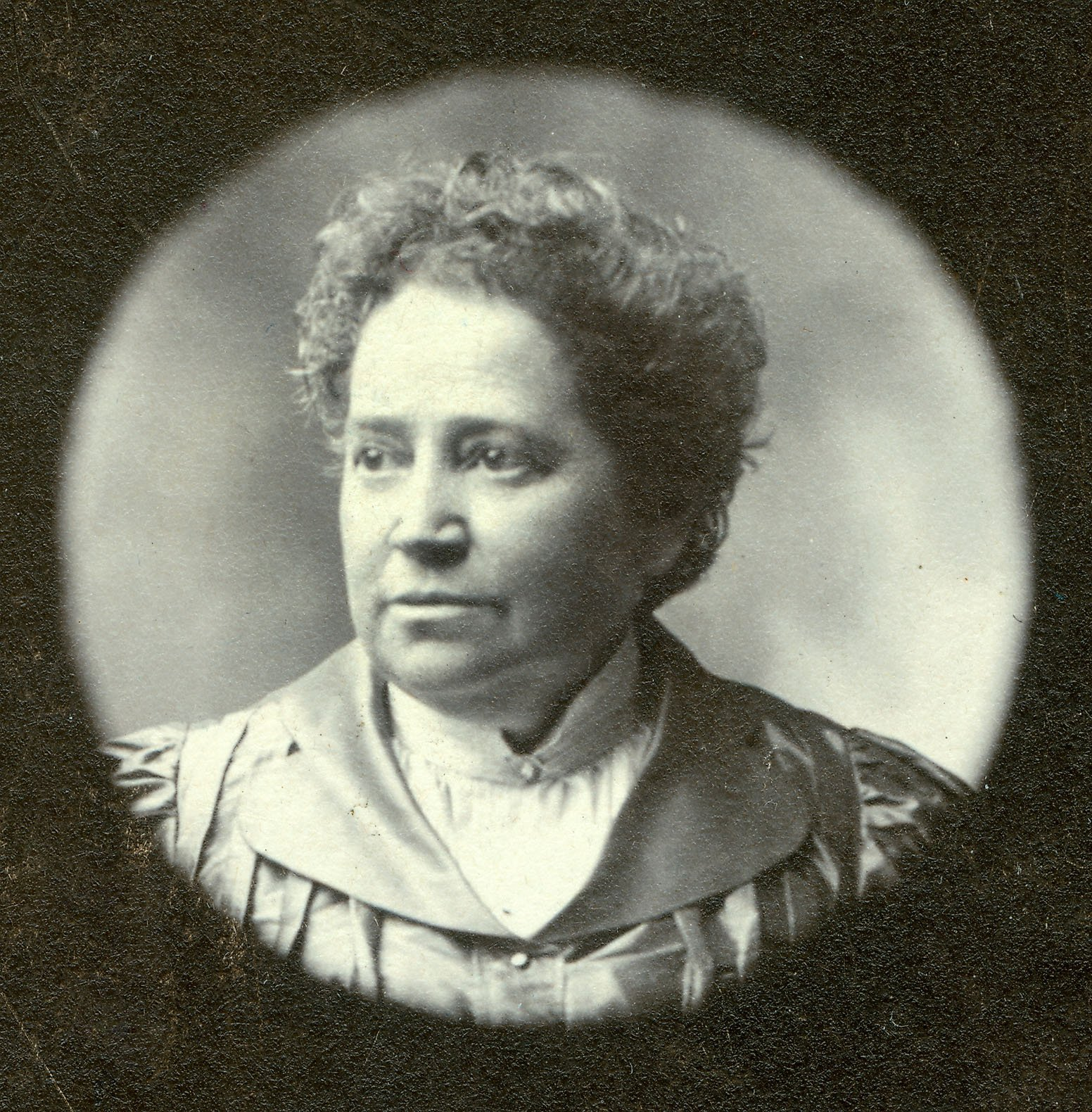
- Abbie Howard Hunt Stuart, Washington State Historical Society
- Born: Abbie Howard Hunt; October 28, 1840; Boston, Massachusetts, US
- Died: January 5, 1902 (aged 61); San Francisco, California, US
- Occupation(s): Capitalist, Club Woman
- Spouse: Robert Giffin Stuart

Abbie Howard Hunt Stuart (1840–1902) was an American suffragist, businesswoman, and founder of the Woman's Club of Olympia.

== Early life and education ==
Stuart née Hunt was born on October 28, 1840, in Boston, Massachusetts., the youngest of five children. Her father, James G. Hunt, and mother, née Clarissa Snow, were descendants of early Massachusetts settlers. She graduated from school in 1860 at age 19 and entered into a clerical career, reportedly contrary to her parents' wishes.

== Move to West Coast and marriage ==
In 1866, Hunt moved to San Francisco, living with an uncle and aunt, John and Charlotte Snow, and listed her occupation as Clerk in the 1870 Federal Census.

In 1871, Hunt paid a visit to Olympia Washington Territory, and met a Mr. and Mrs. Morgan. Mr. Morgan was a land surveyor, and Hunt and Mrs. Morgan accompanied him on an extensive surveying trip throughout the territory. Two years later she returned to Olympia where in 1873 she married Robert Giffin Stuart (1825–1891) a Federal Land Receiver for the United States General Land Office.

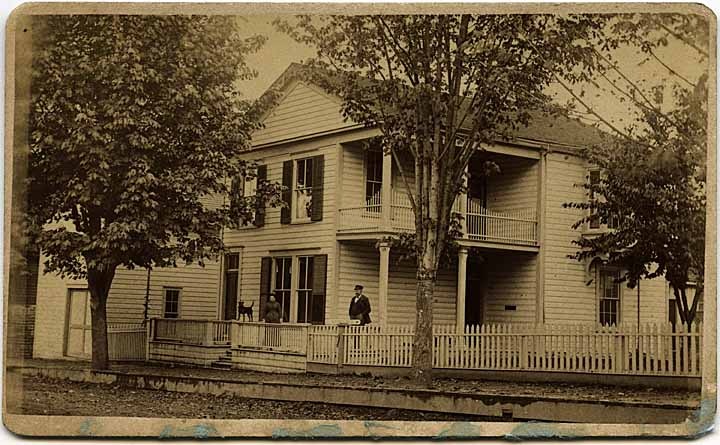
Abbie Howard Hunt and Robert Giffin Stuart home, Courtesy Washington State Historical Society

The Stuarts built a distinguished home at the northeast corner of Main Street and Sixth Avenue (now Capitol Way and Legion Way). In the later 1800s, this home was razed, and a large masonry building, the Stuart Block, constructed in its place.

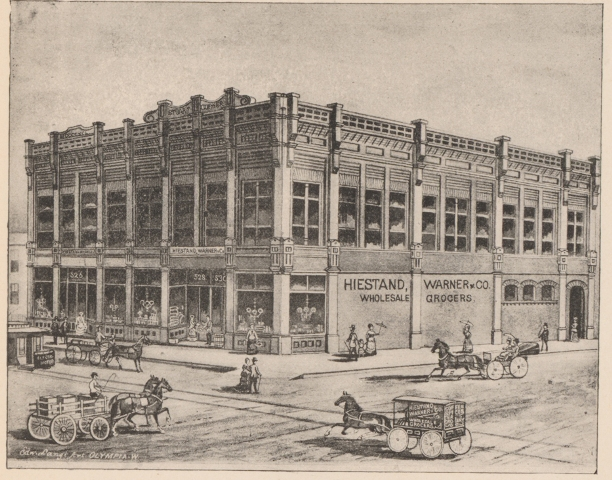
The Stuart Block, from 1891 Olympia Tribune Souvenir Edition

The building housed retail stores including a grocery story and later on a Crombie's Drug Store. The commercial retail stores were in the ground floor while on the second floor housed studios and offices.

== Social activism ==
Stuart was an early supporter of female suffrage, joining with other prominent suffrage activists in Olympia. According to reminiscences by close friend Abigail Scott Duniway, Stuart became an ardent and active supporter of women's suffrage when she witnessed Duniway and Susan B. Anthony speak in Olympia in 1871. While this date conflicts with the fact that Stuart was not then living in Olympia nor married to Robert Stuart, it is likely that Stuart's support of female suffrage began at or near that year.

The idea of a club for women was first discussed between Duniway, Stuart and other suffrage supporters. However, it was Stuart's contention that such a club should not be closely associated with the suffrage movement. She believed that suffrage was so closely identified with prohibition that it would meet with sturdy opposition by anti-prohibitionists. Stuart also hoped to attract membership from women who were against, or on the fence about, female suffrage. Therefore, the club would prohibit discussions about suffrage, prohibition, or politics. Rather, it was modeled on other social clubs that discussed the arts, science, household governance, and other less controversial topics.

== Woman's Club of Olympia ==
The Woman's Club of Olympia was founded on March 10, 1883, by Abbie Howard Hunt Stuart, and a number of prominent female residents of Olympia. The group first met in the Stuart Block owned by the Stuarts, and at various residences and public venues. In 1900, it was able to acquire a stand-alone clubhouse on 10th Avenue.

Stuart was elected as the first president of the Woman's Club and remained active for the rest of her life. She established a rota of member presentations on a variety of subjects, and fined members who came unprepared.

== Personal and business life ==
Stuart's marriage to Robert Stuart, Land Receiver for Thurston County, involved her in campaigns to promote immigration to Washington Territory. In 1875, the Washington Territory Board of Immigration was formed to promote immigration to the underpopulated territory. Abbie Stuart was appointed chair of the board and wrote and issued a pamphlet extolling the virtues of the territory. 15,000 copies of this and subsequent pamphlets were printed, resulting in hundreds of inquiries Abbie Stuart also undertook the task of responding to correspondence sent to her husband, who suffered for several years from ill health and died in 1891.

Stuart departed from norms of female behavior by cutting her hair short and referring to herself as A.H.H. Stuart rather than Mrs. Robert Stuart. Mrs. Stuart's personality was variously described as talented, successful, shrewd, and businesslike.

== Death and aftermath ==

Abbie Howard Hunt Stuart died on January 7, 1902, while on a trip to California. Her funeral was held at the Olympia Woman's Club on January 11, 1902.

Following her death, her will was found to include a number of small bequests to friends from Olympia and elsewhere, with the bulk of her estate left to three woman friends from outside of Olympia. Stuart's closest relative, her brother, John Hunt, was left a nominal $100. He brought suit to challenge the will on the grounds that the will had not been properly executed, and that the three major legatees had exercised an abnormal and unlawful influence on her. The four day trial was reported in detail in the press, and widely attended due to the prominence of Mrs. Stuart and the numerous legatees. The judge upheld the validity of the will, and an appeal from that decision was upheld by the Supreme Court.

== Legacy ==
Following a fire that gutted the original clubhouse, the Woman's Club of Olympia raised funds to build a new house on Washington Street, and named its clubhouse in her honor, which is known as the Abigail [sic] Stuart House. The Abigail Stuart house is a non-profit, nondenominational, and nonpartisan volunteer service organization.

The Stuart Place Apartments in downtown Olympia are named for the Stuarts and the building that once occupied the same location.
