= Daniel Bigelow =

American politician (1824–1905)

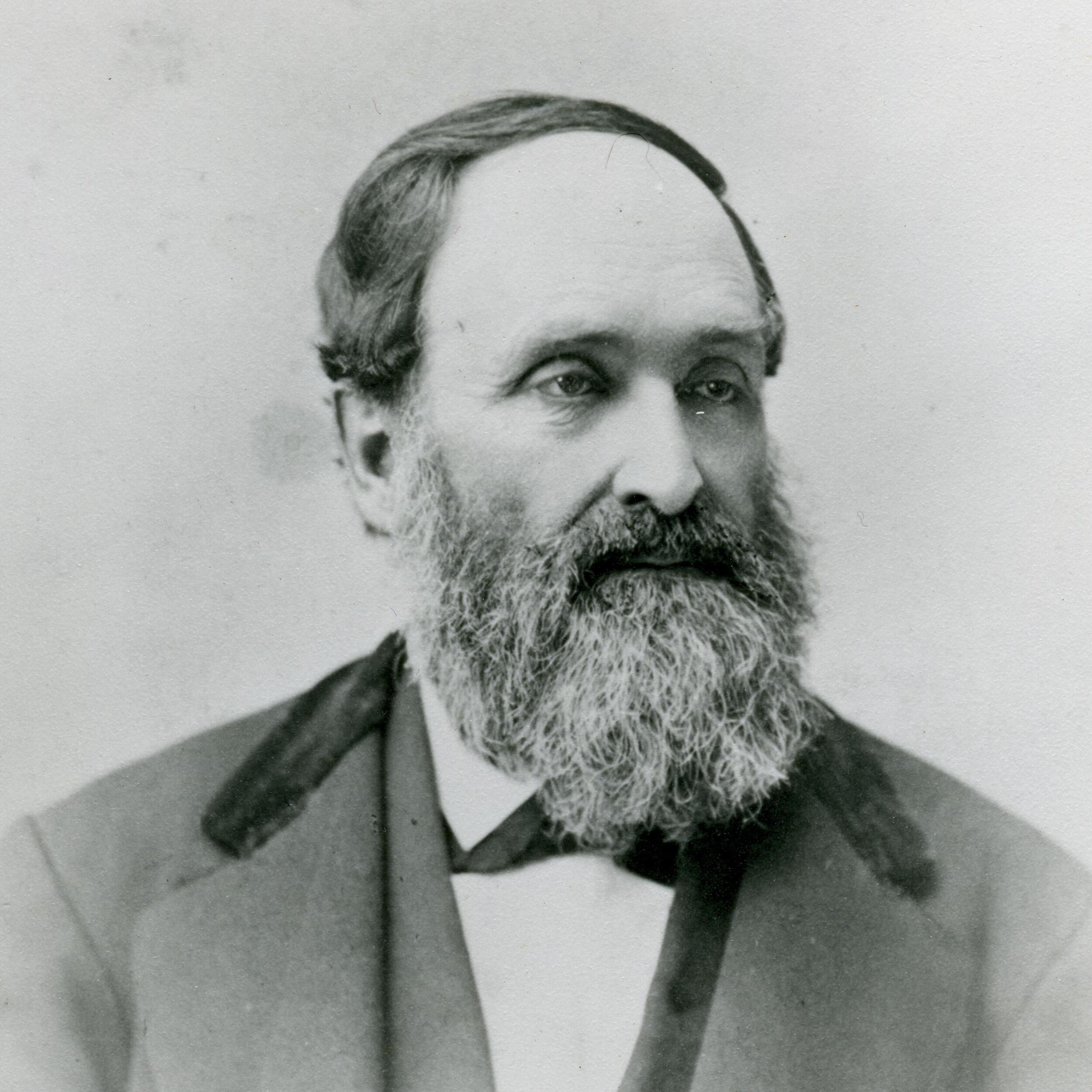
- Bigelow c. 1880 – c. 1905
- Born: March 24, 1824; Ellisburg, New York
- Died: September 15, 1905 (aged 81); Olympia, Washington
- Education: Harvard Law School
- Spouse: Ann Elizabeth White (married 1854)
- Children: 9

Daniel Bigelow (24 March 1824 – 15 September 1905) was a pioneer lawyer and politician in Olympia, Washington.

== Biography ==
Daniel Richardson Bigelow was born March 24, 1824, in Belleville, a hamlet in the township of Ellisburg, New York, a part of Jefferson County, New York. His parents were Jotham Bigelow (1784–1860) (son of Joel and Sarah (née Stowell) Bigelow) and Celinda Bullock (d. 22 Apr 1824).

He graduated from Union College in 1846 and attended Harvard Law School from 1847 to 1849. After graduation, he began practice in Dodgeville, Wisconsin. News of the California Gold Rush sparked Bigelow's interest in relocating to the Pacific Coast. In 1851, Bigelow joined a wagon train headed west and crossed the Oregon Trail with his law books and desk, arriving in Portland in September. After determining Portland already had enough lawyers, he sailed up the coast in the schooner Exact to Puget Sound in November 1851 on the same voyage that carried the Denny Party. He continued south to Smithfield (later renamed Olympia), then part of the northern Oregon Territory. There he established a law office. At the time, there were fewer than 200 American settlers.

Bigelow was a gifted orator whose July 4, 1852, speech in Olympia contributed to the movement to create Washington Territory out of the part of the Oregon territory north of the Columbia River. Bigelow also served as one of the three commissioners who revised the laws of Oregon Territory at Salem during the summer of 1853.

Daniel served as the first Treasurer of Thurston County, a member of the first legislature of Washington Territory in 1854, the first Superintendent of the Olympia School, and President of the Board of Trustees of Puget Sound Wesleyan Institute, the forerunner of the University of Puget Sound.

On June 18, 1854, Bigelow married Ann Elizabeth White, one of the first school teachers in the area. Ann was born November 3, 1836, in Illinois and settled with her family on Chambers Prairie, now part of Lacey, Washington, Thurston County, Washington, southeast of Olympia in what is now Lacey Township, in late 1851. Her father, William White, was one of two casualties in Thurston County of the 1855-56 Indian War.

Daniel and Ann Elizabeth were devout Methodists and helped found the ME church in Olympia. They were also strident advocates of women's suffrage. Bigelow supported extending the right to vote to women in the 1854 legislature and in 1871, while serving as a Territorial Representative, gave a speech to the Washington Legislature advocating voting rights for women. Suffragist Susan B. Anthony visited Olympia to promote the cause and dined with the Bigelows at their home.

The Bigelows were also instrumental in promoting public education in the territory. Daniel helped found the Olympia School District and assisted in the construction of the first school in the early 1850s. Bigelow also served as a regent of the University of Washington in 1866 and later founded the Olympia Collegiate Institute, forerunner of the University of Puget Sound.

Daniel Bigelow died September 15, 1905, at Olympia, the last surviving member of the first territorial legislature. Ann Elizabeth Bigelow died February 8, 1926. The Bigelows had 9 children.

== See also ==
- Bigelow Neighborhood
- Daniel R. Bigelow House
- History of Olympia, Washington
