= Allen Street Bridge disaster =

Allen Street Bridge
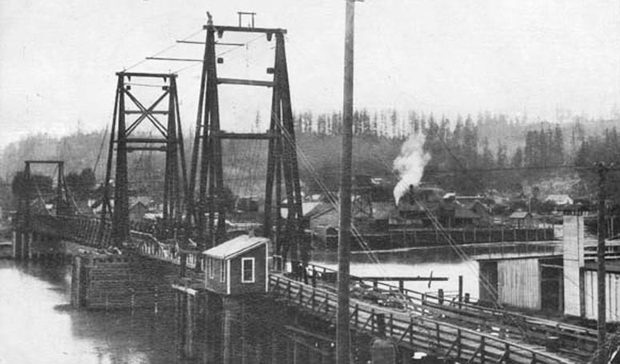
- Allen Street Bridge as it appeared in 1910
- Coordinates: 46°08′42″N 122°54′51″W
- Other name(s): Kelso-Longview Bridge

Characteristics
- Design: Bascule
- Total length: 600 feet (182.9 m)
- Longest span: 300 feet (91.4 m)

History
- Opened: 1907
- Collapsed: January 3, 1923

The Allen Street Bridge was a bridge over the Cowlitz River between Kelso, Washington and Longview, Washington that collapsed on January 3, 1923, killing as many as 35 people. It resulted in the deadliest bridge collapse in Washington history.

== Construction ==
The bridge was a bascule bridge made entirely of wood with a 600-foot (180 m) central span, built in 1907 to replace an earlier wooden bridge. It was renovated in 1915, but many residents refused to use the bridge due to its poor condition.

== Collapse ==
The collapse occurred the day after a log jam of over 3 million board-feet of runaway log boom piled up against the bridge was cleared. This was concluded by structural engineers to have weakened the bridge. According to another source, the original old, rotten bridge deck had been overlaid by another layer of timbers which, combined with the soaking of the entire deck thickness, overloaded the span.

The collapse occurred during evening rush hour with workers coming home from the Longview mills. A stalled car caused traffic to bunch on the bridge; according to witnesses, the bridge was carrying about 20 vehicles and 100 to 150 pedestrians when a support cable failed for unknown reasons. The two supporting towers fell and the 300-foot center span of the bridge collapsed.

Initial contemporary newspaper reports stated that up to 80 people were killed in the collapse, with some witnesses saying 150. By January 9, reports were that 19 people had been killed. The figure compiled by authorities stood at 17, but probably did not account for many transient workers. Many of the missing bodies were probably carried down the Cowlitz to the Columbia River and then out to sea. An estimate today is that 35 lives were lost. Using even the lowest estimate of 17, as of 2014, the disaster stands as Washington's greatest loss of life caused by bridge failure.

== Aftermath ==
The bridge loss is the first in a list of seventy accidental losses compiled by the Washington State Department of Transportation between 1923 and 1998. This disaster brought about bridge inspection programs conducted by the state agency and counties.

A new four-lane vertical-lift drawbridge, of steel and cement construction, was under construction when the 1906 bridge collapsed. It was to connect Kelso with the new planned city of Longview on the west side of the Cowlitz, at a cost of $228,000. It was built by the Washington Department of Highways and opened to traffic on March 19, 1923. The vertical-lift bridge remained in use until it was closed in 2000 and replaced by a new span.
