= Forrest Phelps =

American politician (1853–1918)

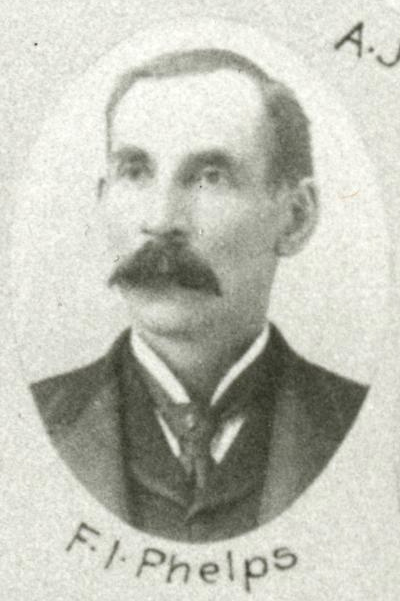
- Phelps in 1895

Member of the Washington House of Representatives for the 1st district
- In office 1895–1899

Personal details
- Born: June 10, 1853 Fredonia, New York, United States
- Died: October 24, 1918 (aged 65) Kelso, Washington, United States
- Party: Populist
- Spouse: Jennie Slawson (née McCullough)

Forrest I. Phelps (June 10, 1853 – October 24, 1918) was an American politician in the state of Washington. He served in the Washington House of Representatives.
