= Mary Klicka =

Canadian-American dietitian (1921-2007)

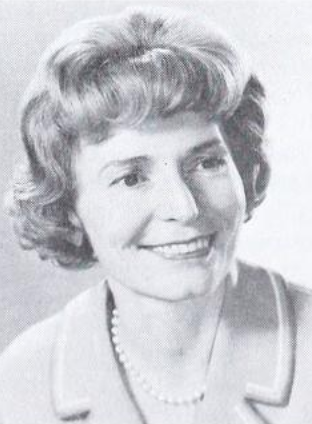
- Mary V. Klicka, from a 1972 publication of the United States federal government
- Born: Mary Victoria Richardson; April 30, 1921; Winnipeg, Manitoba, Canada
- Died: August 26, 2007 (aged 86); Waterbury, Connecticut, U.S.
- Occupations: Dietitian, food technologist
- Known for: Distinguished Civilian Service Award (1970)

Mary Victoria Richardson Klicka (April 30, 1921 – August 26, 2007) was a Canadian-American registered dietitian and food technologist for the United States Army. She designed MREs and provisions for astronauts in the Mercury, Gemini, and Apollo programs. In 1970, she received the Distinguished Civilian Service Award from the Department of Defense.

== Early life and education ==
Mary Victoria Richardson was born in Winnipeg, Manitoba, the daughter of William Henry Richardson and Clara Myrtle Ferguson Richardson. Her father, a civil engineer, was from England, and her mother was born in North Dakota; the family moved to Kelso, Washington when she was a girl. After graduating from Kelso High School in 1939, she attended Lower Columbia College prior to transferring to the University of Washington. There she earned a bachelor's degree in dietetics in 1944 and a master's degree in business administration from the University of Chicago in 1947.

== Career ==
Klicka served an internship at Michael Reese Hospital. She was a food technologist working for the United States Army beginning in 1951. She designed rations and their packaging for special contexts, including MREs and food for the Mercury, Gemini, and Apollo manned space missions, at the Army's Food Engineering Laboratory in Natick, Massachusetts. In 1958, she was assigned to the United Nations to work on rations issues of the UN's Emergency Force in Gaza. Her research was published in Aerospace Medicine, Military Medicine, Journal of Food Science, Life Sciences and Space Research, Cereal Science Today, School Lunch Journal, and Journal of the American Dietetic Association.

In 1966 Klicka was decorated for Meritorious Civilian Service. In 1968 she was decorated for Exceptional Civilian Service. In 1969 she received the Woman of Achievement Award from the Massachusetts Federation of Business and Professional Women's Clubs. In 1970, she received the Distinguished Civilian Service Award from the Department of Defense. She was nominated twice for the Federal Woman's Award, in 1965 and 1968. In 1996, she was inducted into the Army Soldier Systems Command Hall of Fame. She was a member of the American Dietetic Association, the National Council on Aging, and the Institute of Food Technologists.

== Selected publications and reports by Klicka ==
- "Effects of Reduced Fat Intake on Serum Lipids in Healthy Young Men and Women at the U.S. Military Academy" (1995, with Karl E. Friedl, Nancy King, Louis J. Marchitelli, and Eldon Wayne Askew)
- "Effects of Storage Time and Temperature on Nutritional Content of Fortified Fruitcake" (1987, with Ann Morrill, Doris E. Sherman, Margaret T. Branagan, and Ivy C. Fossum)
- "A Time-Temperature Model for Sensory Acceptance of a Military Ration" (1987, with Edward W. Ross, Joan Kalick, and Margaret T. Branagan)
- "Acceptance of a Military Ration After 24-Month Storage" (1985, with Edward W. Ross, Joan Kalick, and Margaret T. Branagan)
- "Food for U. S Manned Space Flight" (1982, with Malcolm C. Smith Jr.)
- "Effect of Holding Time and Temperatures on the Quality of Precooked Frozen Meals" (1982, with Betty A. Davis)
- "Operational Rations Current and Future of the Department of Defense" (1982, with Alice I. Meyer)
- "Summary of Operational Rations" (1982, with Vera C. Mason and Alice I. Meyer)
- "Sensory and Nutritional Evaluation of Meat Loaves with and without Granular Soy Concentrate" (1982, with Christine A. Kubik, Ivy C. Fossum, and Bonita M. Atwood)
- "Nutritionally Fortified Fruitcake (Thermoprocessed, Flexibly Packaged) Developed for Shuttle Flight Use" (1981, with D. E. Sherman, Bonita Atwood, W. Swantak, K. M. Thompson, and Margaret T. Branagan)
- "Food technology problems related to space feeding" (1970, with Herbert A. Hollender and Malcolm C. Smith Jr.)
- "Feeding Man in Space" (1970, with Herbert A. Hollender)
- "Food for Astronauts" (1967, with Herbert A. Hollender and Paul A. Lachance)
- "Development of Space Foods" (1964)

== Personal life ==
Klicka married William John Klicka in 1946, and had a son. She died in Waterbury, Connecticut in 2007, aged 86 years.
