= Monticello Convention =

Coordinates: 46°06′56.3″N 122°54′46.9″W

The Monticello Convention refers to several meetings held in 1851 and 1852 to petition Congress to split the Oregon Territory into two separate territories; one north of the Columbia River and one south.

== Background ==
The influx of people settling on the north side of the Columbia River in the 1840s, then under the jurisdiction of the Oregon Territory, caused political conflicts over the lack of basic needs addressed by the territorial government. Several major issues and events were the main causes to this dissatisfaction including that basic needs, such as mail, roads, military protection and law enforcement were increasingly required. The Oregon Territory government would not increase spending to satisfy these needs. Additional concerns were cited over the Hudson's Bay Company, which held the most valuable agricultural land and the company's livestock would trespass on settler's lands. Settlements north of the Columbia River were increasingly being cut off as the government services; Oregon City, Oregon and Salem, Oregon, required traveling for several days.

On July 4, 1851, complaints were brought by citizens to Olympia which were holding Independence Day celebrations. One settler, Hugh Goldsborough, read the Declaration of Independence and a lawyer, John Chapman, gave an inspirational address referred to as the future state of Columbia. Chapman's speech instigated an election of delegates to attend a convention at Cowlitz Landing, near present-day Toledo, Lewis County to be held the following month.

== Cowlitz Convention ==
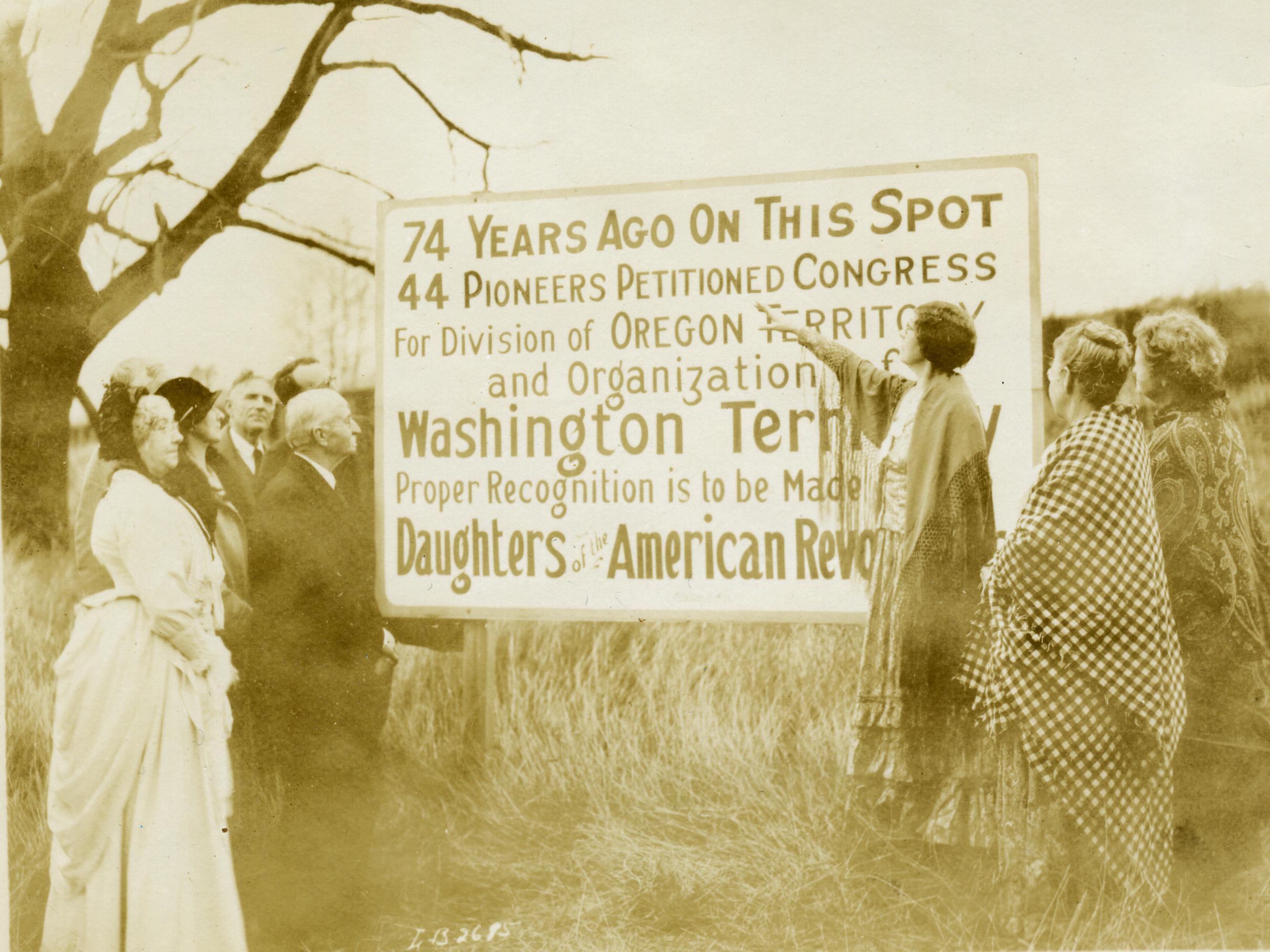
Historic marker dedication near Longview in 1927

The first meeting of settlers began on August 29, 1851 at Cowlitz Landing. They met to draft a petition to Congress to create a new territory north of the Columbia River. Seth Catlin, a former Illinois legislator was elected president of the convention. Taking two days, documents were prepared explaining their demands from Congress and why they needed Congress' support. The document was a 1,500-word "Memorial to Congress" listing the problems and issues facing those living north of the Columbia River. The petition included a recommendation for universal manhood suffrage beginning at the age of 18, which came about 120 year later. Territory and county borders were also approved as well as other elements of local governing. These documents were published in The Oregonian and the Oregon Spectator, which eventually made their way to Joseph Lane, Governor of the Oregon Territory.

The determination of a formal territory convention and a selection of delegates was held at the Jackson Courthouse, the first recognized courthouse in what would become the Washington Territory, on October 27, 1852. The meeting also chose the town of Monticello, Oregon, later destroyed by flooding in 1867 and was located within present-day Longview, Washington.

== Monticello Convention ==
The convention and petition, taking its name from the town of Monticello, was held on November 25, 1852. Still feeling ignored by the Oregon Territory government, 44 delegates met to develop, complete and sign another petition to have Columbia Territory established. Although the petition, known as the Monticello Convention Memorial, was a shorter than the earlier Cowlitz Memorial, it was considered better written and quickly adopted. After signing the petition, it was again forwarded on to Joseph Lane, who supported the petition and had it sent on to Congress.

Notable signees include William Nathaniel Bell, Arthur A. Denny, and Doc Maynard, early founders and settlers of Seattle. Additional signers of the Monticello petition were Peter Crawford, a noted land surveyor, and public servants, Calvin Henry Hale and John R. Jackson.

== Outcome ==
Bill H.R. 348, "to establish the territorial government of Columbia," was introduced in the House of Representatives from the Committee on Territories. It was introduced by Charles E. Stuart on January 25, 1853. Debates arose, not about whether the bill would pass, but on the name of the new territory. Richard H. Stanton, a representative from Kentucky, proposed the name Washington after George Washington to avoid confusion with the District of Columbia. The title of the bill was changed to "an act to establish the Territorial government of Washington" in the House and passed on February 10, 1853. It then passed the Senate on March 2, 1853 without any need for discussion. After 21 months of campaigning, the bill was signed by President Millard Fillmore on March 2, 1853. The Organic act bill also served as the basis for law in Washington until it gained statehood in 1889.
