= Peter Crawford (land surveyor) =

Scottish-born land surveyor

Peter W. Crawford
- Born: Peter W. Crawford; 22 November 1818; Kelso, Scottish Borders, Scotland
- Died: 10 June 1889 (aged 70); Vancouver, Washington Territory
- Resting place: Old City Cemetery, Vancouver, Washington
- Education: University of Edinburgh
- Occupation: Surveyor
- Known for: Surveyor, pioneer
- Spouse: Zillah Patterson
- Children: 5

Peter Crawford (22 November 1818 – 10 June 1889) was a Scottish-born land surveyor who was a prominent pioneer in the Pacific Northwest. He founded Kelso, Washington and platted numerous towns in the Oregon Territory which later became the states of Oregon and Washington. He was a member of the Monticello Convention which petitioned and successfully convinced Congress to create Washington Territory out of the Oregon Territory.

== Early life ==
Crawford was born near Kelso, Scotland, on 22 November 1818. He was one of six children and born the middle of three sons. He attended school in Kelso after which he moved to Edinburg to attend the University of Edinburgh where he studied mathematics and surveying. Upon finishing school, he moved in 1838 to London for three months, then to Southampton, where he completed his studies. Peter's older brother Alexander (Alec) had moved immigrated to America in 1835 where he married and convinced Peter to also immigrate. At the age of 24, on a ship called ‘’Rainbow’’, Peter made an 1842 voyage from England to Quebec, Canada.

== Americas ==
After arriving in Quebec and unable to find work, he made his way to Michigan, crossing the Great Lakes. In Michigan, he found a job working with a survey crew in Kalamazoo, Michigan. Here he contracted malaria. In 1843, he joins Alec's family in Indiana here he taught school for a year before moving to Chicago where he took a job as an accountant.

In 1846, he returned to Indiana to persuade Alec and his family to move to the northwest where there was growing opportunities and free land. Citing the difficult journey for his wife and two young sons, Alec declined. Peter then joined George Cline and his family, leaving Valparaiso, Indiana on 12 April 1847. They reached The Dalles on 12 October of that same year and to Switzer's Landing, across the Columbia River from Vancouver, on 26 November. After returned to the Cascade Mountains to assist in driving down loose cattle that were left behind, he made his way to Portland on 18 December 1847. After a short time he returned to Vancouver, where he met James O. Rayner and E. West, who owned a skiff. Peter joined them in the boat searching for land they could claim. Reverend Marcus Whitman had recommended searching north to the Cowlitz River, which they reached on 12 December 1847. On 25 December, he and West recorded adjoining claims in the office of record in Oregon City. Although he and West both made claims in the region, Crawford was the first to settle it, building a cabin and made land improvements. He would become a sought after surveyor as other settlers wanted their claims surveyed.

As news came of the California Gold Rush in 1848, many men from the Oregon Territory were enticed to seek fortunes. Although Peter had his claim, he did not have any property that could be converted to cash so he could afford passage to California. Being a surveyor, he would survey town sites and claims. For his services he would receive lots in payments and even payments in wheat. Accumulating a sizable amount of wheat, he had a portion ground, which he sold for cash, gave a portion to newly arriving emigrants and traded the balance for an ox, which he sold to a butcher. In the spring of 1848, at the request of Henry Williamson, Peter surveyed for a town site on the north bank of the Columbia River, just west of Hudson's Bay Company's Fort Vancouver. Mr. Williamson called the town Vancouver City, to differentiate between the town and the fort. This would later be shortened to the city of Vancouver. In early 1849, began his journey seeking a fortune prospecting in the California Gold Rush. Upon arrival in San Francisco, he engaged in mining operations for seven months until returning to settle his land claim on the Cowlitz River in October. The following spring he planted an apple orchard and built a house, which burned by fire in 1851. In 1850, he began laying out and platting other early towns in northwest Oregon, including Milwaukie, Milton, St. Helens, Rainier and Columbia City. He also surveyed for additions to Oregon City.

In 1852, Crawford participated and was a signing member of the Monticello Convention. On 25 November 1852, 44 regional settlers adopted a Memorial to Congress requesting separation from Oregon Territory and the creation of a separate territory due to a number of issues they had with the Oregon government. Their request was successful and on 2 March 1853, President Millard Fillmore signed legislation that created the Territory of Washington.

Having settled in Kelso in 1849, Peter served in a number of public capacities as the population grew. He was a justice of the peace, a notary public as well as being the first elected surveyor of Cowlitz County. He was held the position of United States Deputy Surveyor.

In 1881, Peter and his family moved to Vancouver. Three years later, in 1884, he platted his claim on the Cowlitz and founded the town of Kelso, which he named after his hometown of Kelso, Scotland. His home was converted into the first Kelso school.

== Personal ==
Crawford married Zillah Patterson, born 3 February 1836, in 1854 and had five children. Their oldest son, William Patterson Crawford, is considered one of the builders of Portland. Zillah died on 26 July 1888, followed by Peter on 10 June 1889.

== Writings ==
- The overland journey to Oregon in 1847 : an autobiography on the Oregon Trail
- Narrative of the overland journey to Oregon
- Peter Crawford's Cowlitz journal; first published writings of the founder of Kelso

== Legacy ==
- Peter Crawford Bridge, Kelso, WA
- Crawford Street, Kelso, WA
