= Trout Lake School =

Location
- 2310 State Route 141; Trout Lake, Washington; 45°59′21″N 121°30′56″W

Information
- School district: Trout Lake School District #400
- Grades: K–12
- Enrollment: 132 (grades 5-12) (2023-2024)
- Website: Trout Lake School District

Trout Lake School is a public school that serves approximately 200 students in grades K–12 located in Trout Lake, Washington. Unlike most school districts, where there is a clear distinction between the elementary, middle/junior high, and high school levels, they are combined at Trout Lake School. 83% of the students are White, while 13% are Hispanic and the rest are American Indian.
