= Daniel R. Bigelow House =

- U.S. National Register of Historic Places
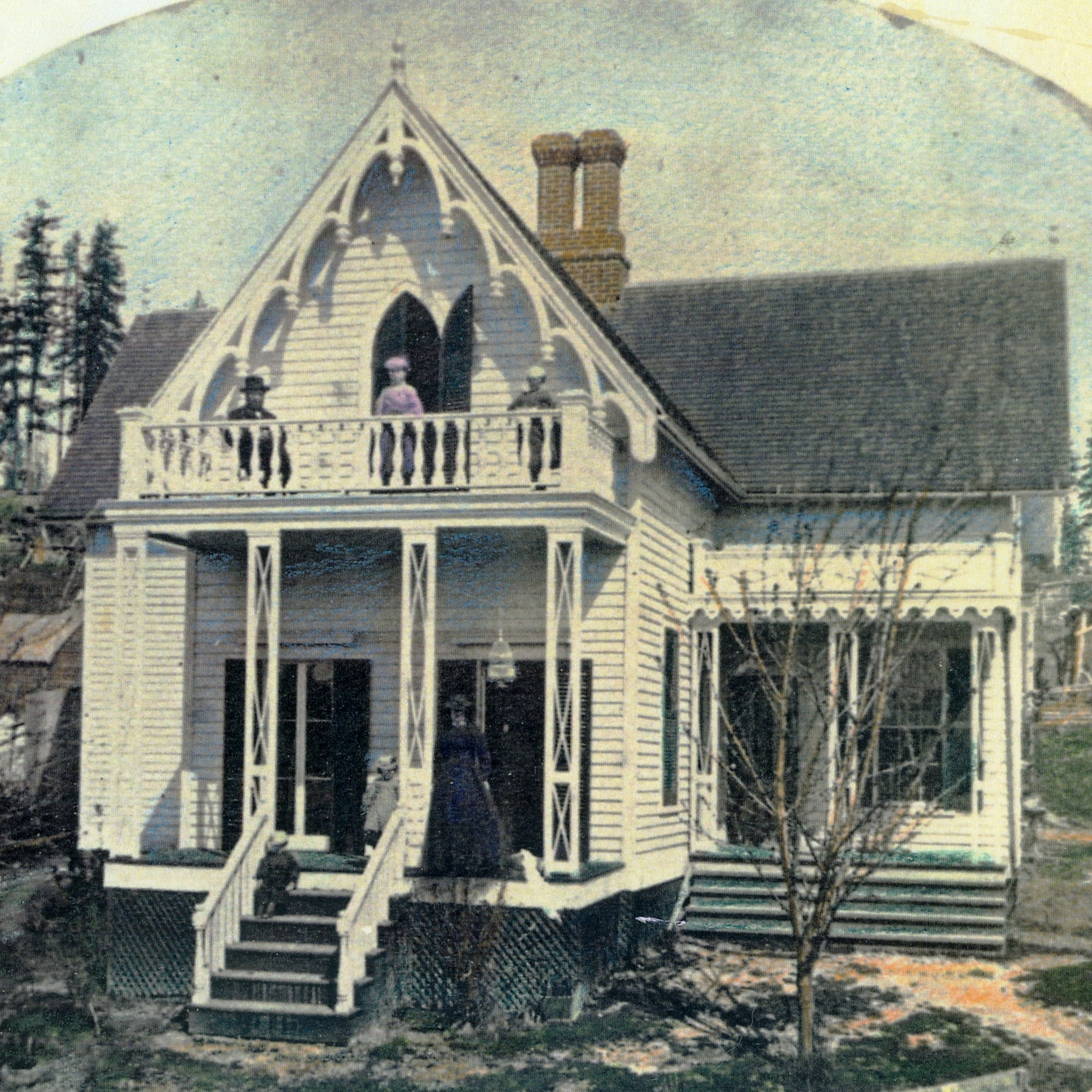
- Bigelow House c. 1866

- Location within Washington (state) Location within the United States
- Interactive map showing the location of the Daniel R. Bigelow House
- Location: 918 Glass Ave. NE; Olympia, Washington
- Coordinates: 47°2′59.56″N 122°53′27.44″W
- Built: 1854
- Architectural style: Carpenter Gothic
- NRHP reference No.: 79002562
- Added to NRHP: August 7, 1979

The Bigelow House, also known as the Bigelow House Museum, is a historic house museum located at 918 Glass Avenue Northeast in the Bigelow Neighborhood of Olympia, Washington. Built by Daniel Bigelow in 1854, the house was designed in the Carpenter Gothic style. It was listed on the National Register of Historic Places in 1979.

== History ==
Harvard Law School graduate Daniel Bigelow arrived in Olympia in 1851 after crossing the Oregon Trail. He took up a 160-acre (0.65 km^{2}) Donation Land Claim just east of the new town and built a two-room cabin near an artesian spring overlooking Budd Inlet in South Puget Sound. In 1854, Bigelow married Ann Elizabeth White, one of the first school teachers in Washington Territory. They built the present house during the summer of that year, where they went on to raise eight children.

The Bigelows were active in many political causes including temperance, women's suffrage and public education. Over the years many historical figures visited the Bigelows including Snoqualmie headman Patkanim, Suffragette Susan B. Anthony and George Pickett when he was stationed in the territory prior to the American Civil War. The Bigelows were also a host family for some of the Mercer Girls when they arrived in 1866. The Bigelows lived in the house until their deaths; Daniel in 1905 and Ann Elizabeth in 1926.

The house remained in the Bigelow family until 1994 when owners Daniel S Bigelow (grandson of Daniel and Ann Elizabeth) and Mary Ann Campbell Bigelow helped form the non-profit Bigelow House Preservation Association (BHPA) to save the house from developers. BHPA restored the house to its territorial era appearance, naming it the Bigelow House Museum in 1995. The Bigelow family also retained a life-estate agreement that allowed them to remain in the house for the rest of their lives.

Since 2005 the Bigelow House Museum is fully open as a public museum, displaying original territorial era furnishings, photos, and documents. It is one of the oldest and most intact pioneer-era homes in Washington. The home is also the centerpiece of the Bigelow Neighborhood, which includes many homes built by the Bigelow and White families. In 2013 BHPA merged with the Olympia Historical Society becoming the Olympia Historical Society and Bigelow House Museum.

== See also ==
- Hale House
- History of Olympia, Washington
- History of Washington State
- List of museums in Washington (state)
