= Colin Kelly (American football) =

American gridiron football player (born 1989)

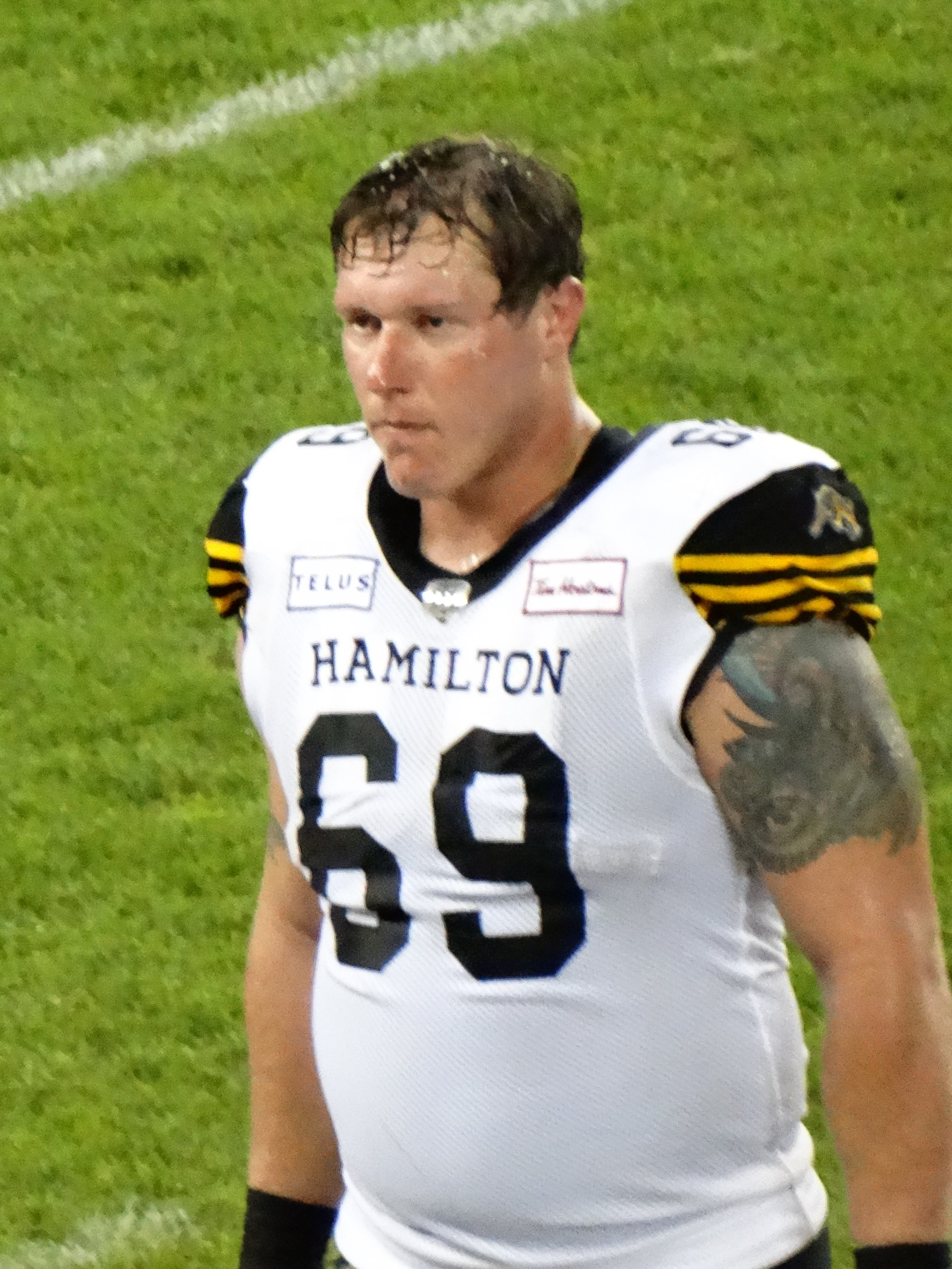
- Kelly with the Hamilton Tiger-Cats in 2022

Profile
- Position: Offensive lineman

Personal information
- Born: December 29, 1989 (age 36); Longview, Washington, U.S.
- Listed height: 6 ft 5 in (1.96 m)
- Listed weight: 325 lb (147 kg)

Career information
- High school: Kelso (WA)
- College: Oregon State
- NFL draft: 2013: undrafted

Career history
- Kansas City Chiefs (2013); Ottawa Redblacks (2014–2015); San Francisco 49ers (2016)*; Chicago Bears (2016)*; San Francisco 49ers (2016)*; Jacksonville Jaguars (2017)*; Edmonton Eskimos / Elks (2017–2022); Hamilton Tiger-Cats (2022); Seattle Sea Dragons (2023); Saskatchewan Roughriders (2023)
- * Offseason or practice squad member only

Awards and highlights
- All-XFL Team (2023)
- Stats at Pro Football Reference
- Stats at CFL.ca

Colin Kelly (born December 29, 1989) is a professional gridiron football offensive tackle who is a free agent. He most recently played for the Saskatchewan Roughriders of the Canadian Football League (CFL). He played college football at Oregon State. He was signed by the Kansas City Chiefs as an undrafted free agent in 2013. He has also been a member of the San Francisco 49ers, Chicago Bears and Jacksonville Jaguars in the National Football League (NFL), the Ottawa Redblacks and Edmonton Elks in the CFL, and the Seattle Sea Dragons of the XFL.

== College career ==
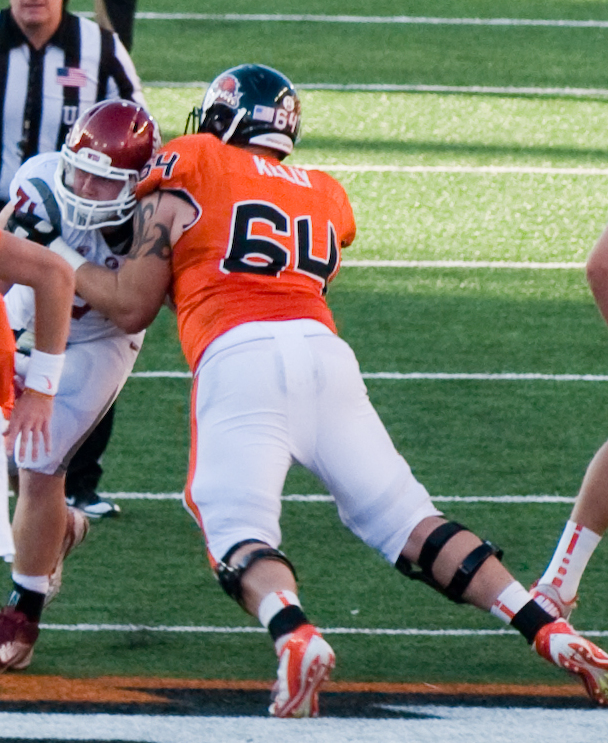
Kelly with Oregon State Beavers in 2012

Kelly attended Oregon State University and played for the Oregon State Beavers football program beginning in 2008. After redshirting his freshman year in 2008, Kelly played in 12 games for Oregon State, with the majority of his playing time coming on special teams. In 2010, Kelly played in 11 games on special teams and as a back-up tackle. Between his junior and senior seasons from 2011 to 2012, Kelly started 25 straight games at right tackle for the Beavers.

== Professional career ==
=== Kansas City Chiefs ===
Kelly signed with the Kansas City Chiefs as an undrafted free agent following the 2013 NFL draft. Kelly spent the entire 2013 NFL season on the Chiefs injured reserve list following a knee injury he suffered in July 2013. On June 3, 2014, the Chiefs released Kelly.

=== Ottawa Redblacks ===
On June 27, 2014, the Ottawa Redblacks (CFL) signed Kelly as a free agent. In 2014, Kelly started in eight games for the Redblacks, in a season in which they went on to finish with a record of 2–16. The following season, Kelly started in all 18 regular season games, as well as in the East division final against the Hamilton Tiger-Cats and the 103rd Grey Cup, which Ottawa lost, 26–20 to the Edmonton Eskimos.

=== San Francisco 49ers ===
On January 20, 2016, the San Francisco 49ers signed Kelly to a future/reserve contract. The 49ers struck a deal with Kelly for a two-year contract, with $65,000 of his first year salary guaranteed. During OTAs, Kelly saw action with the second string offensive line group. On September 3, in an attempt to trim their roster down to the 53-man limit, San Francisco released Kelly and 20 other members of the roster.

=== Chicago Bears ===
On September 26, 2016, the Chicago Bears signed Kelly to their practice squad. On November 9, Kelly was released from the Bears' practice squad.

=== San Francisco 49ers (II) ===
On November 15, 2016, Kelly was signed to the 49ers' practice squad.

=== Jacksonville Jaguars ===
On January 11, 2017, Kelly signed a reserve/future contract with the Jacksonville Jaguars. On May 1, 2017, Kelly was released by the Jaguars.

=== Edmonton Eskimos / Elks ===
On May 9, 2017, Kelly signed with the Edmonton Eskimos. He signed a contract extension through the 2022 season on January 11, 2021.

=== Hamilton Tiger-Cats ===
On June 26, 2022, Kelly was traded to the Hamilton Tiger-Cats in exchange for a seventh-round pick in the 2023 CFL draft. In February 2023, the CFL handed Kelly a two-game suspension for violating the league's drug policy. He was not re-signed by Hamilton, or any other CFL club.

=== Seattle Sea Dragons ===
Kelly signed with the Seattle Sea Dragons of the XFL on February 14, 2023. He was released from his contract on June 5, 2023.

=== Saskatchewan Roughriders ===
On June 4, 2023, Kelly signed with the Saskatchewan Roughriders. He became a free agent upon the expiry of his contract on February 13, 2024.
