= Kelso High School (Washington) =

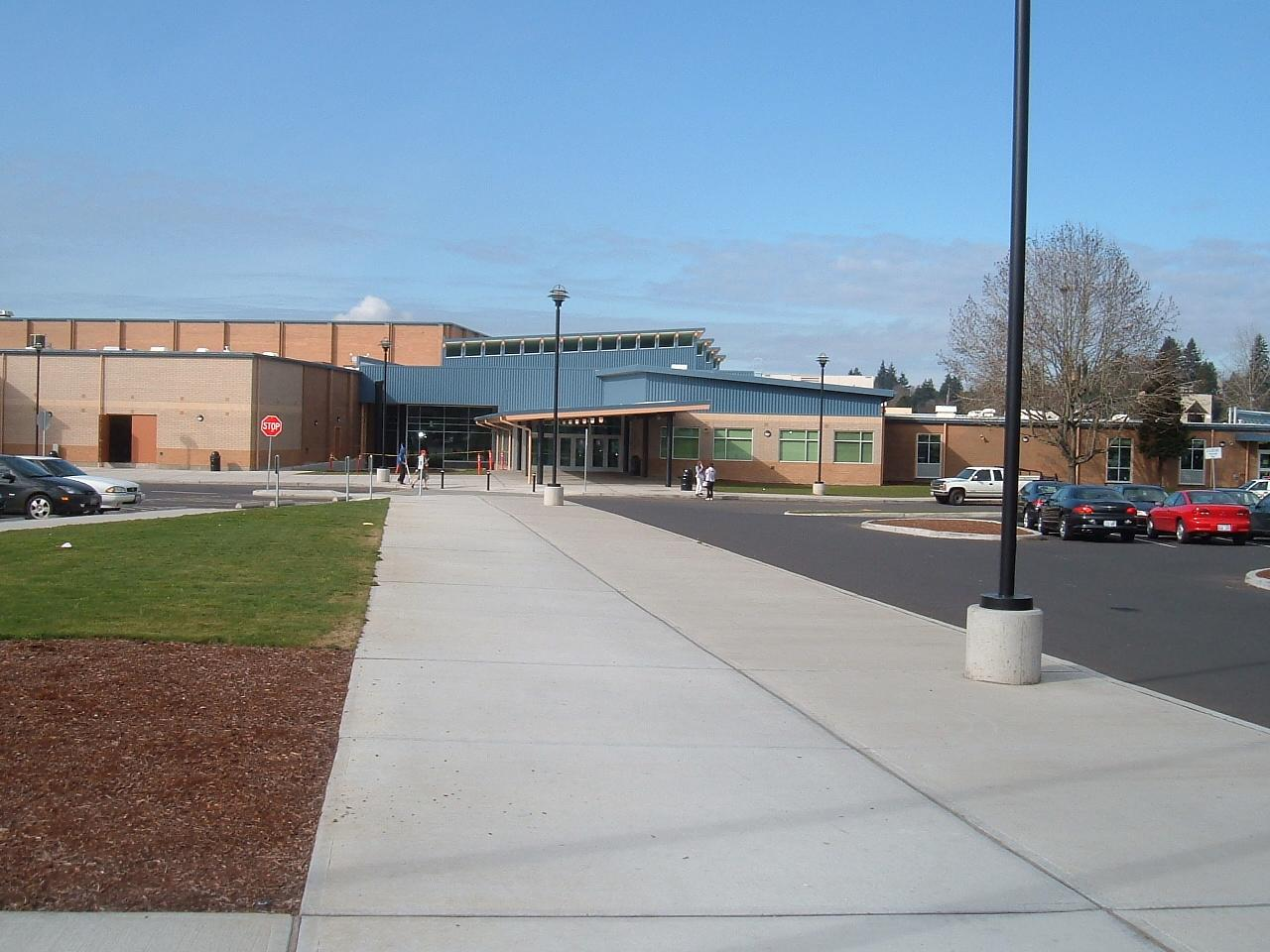
- March 2008

Location
- 1904 Allen Street; Kelso, Washington; United States; 46.143°N 122.892°W

Information
- Type: Public
- Motto: We Are Kelso
- Established: 1905; 121 years ago
- School district: Kelso School District
- Principal: Sheri Walker
- Teaching staff: 73.80 (FTE)
- Grades: 9–12
- Enrollment: 1,390 (2024–2025)
- Student to teacher ratio: 18.83
- Colors: Royal Blue, Gold, and White
- Athletics conference: Greater St. Helens 3A
- Mascot: The Hilanders and Lassies
- Accreditation: NAAS
- Yearbook: Kelso Bagpipe, formally known as the Tamahnawus
- Website: www.kelso.wednet.edu/o/khs

Kelso High School is a public high school in Kelso, Washington, United States.

== History ==
In 1905, the first Kelso High School (then known as Washington School) classes began with the first seniors graduating in 1909. Thirteen years later, a new high school was built, known as Kelso High School, in 1922. The first year the high school was accredited by the Northwest Association of Accredited Schools was in 1927. The school was moved to its current location after a new school was built in 1970.

The original Kelso High School was torn down in 1987. In 2003, the building underwent extensive renovations and additions to accommodate the district wide change from junior high (7th-9th) to middle school (6th-8th) (Huntington and Coweeman). The 100th Kelso senior class graduated in 2008.

== Sports ==
Kelso participates in the second-largest classification of high schools in the Washington Interscholastic Activities Association (WIAA) in the six-team Greater St. Helens 3A League. KHS has a very long history and tradition with two local rivalries across the Cowlitz River in Longview; R.A. Long and Mark Morris high schools. The football games between Kelso and RA Long are known as "The Battle of the Plaid" and have met for over 90 games.

=== State championships ===
- Football: 1983
- Boys Track: 1984
- Baseball: 1995
- Softball: 1998, 2009, 2010
- Girls Track: 2023
- Girls Wrestling: 2025, 2026

== Notable alumni ==
- Jeff Bailey - first baseman for the Arizona Diamondbacks
- Howard Hobson - began his coaching career at Kelso High School
- Colin Kelly - Professional football player in the Canadian Football League
- Mary Klicka - Food technologist for the United States Army
- Vernon J. Kondra - Retired Air Force Lieutenant General
- Tommy Lloyd - Head basketball coach at the University of Arizona
- Trevor May - Major League Baseball pitcher for the Oakland Athletics
- David Richie - Kelso High 1992 graduate, Denver Broncos, San Francisco 49ers, and retired with Green Bay Packers
- Jason Schmidt - retired Major League Baseball pitcher Pittsburgh Pirates, San Francisco Giants, Los Angeles Dodgers
- Sid Snyder - Politician and businessman
- Connor Trinneer - Actor in Star Trek, Enterprise
