= Southwest Washington Regional Airport =

- IATA: KLS; ICAO: KKLS; FAA LID: KLS

Summary
- Airport type: Public
- Owner: City of Kelso
- Serves: Longview-Kelso Metropolitan Area
- Elevation AMSL: 20 ft / 6 m
- Coordinates: 46°07′05″N 122°53′54″W
- Website: Official site
- Interactive map of Southwest Washington Regional Airport

Runways
Direction	Length		Surface
Direction	ft	m	Surface
12/30	4,391	1,338	Asphalt

Statistics (2008)
- Aircraft operations: 40,860
- Based aircraft: 71
- Source: Federal Aviation Administration

Southwest Washington Regional Airport (IATA: KLS, ICAO: KKLS, FAA LID: KLS) is a city-owned public-use airport located two nautical miles (3.7 km) southeast of the central business district of Kelso, in Cowlitz County, Washington, United States. The airport was renamed in 2009, prior to which it was known as the Kelso-Longview Regional Airport, or Molt Taylor Field, named after flying car designer Moulton Taylor.

== History ==
Kelso-Longview Airport opened in May 1941 on 109 acres (0.44 km^{2}) of a nearby dairy farm, as a training field for amateur pilots, and has since become a regional transportation center for southwest Washington. In 1950 the old landing strip was paved and in the 1960s the first administration and terminal buildings were built. Further improvements were completed in the 1980s due to increasing traffic.

== Facilities and aircraft ==
Southwest Washington Regional Airport covers an area of 110 acres (45 ha) at an elevation of 20 feet (6 m) above mean sea level. It has one asphalt paved runway designated 12/30 which measures 4,391 x 100 ft (30 m). (1,338 x 30 m). It is separated for takeoffs and landings (the airport, faced with growing air traffic, segmented its runway in 1980).

For the 12-month period ending March 30, 2008, the airport had 40,860 aircraft operations, an average of 111 per day: 94% general aviation, 4% air taxi and 2% military. At that time there were 71 aircraft based at this airport: 85% single-engine, 10% multi-engine, 1% jet and 4% ultralight.

The airport has one passenger terminal.

== Flight School ==
There is one flight school located at the airport.

== See also ==
- List of airports in Washington
