= Pamela Case Hale =

American politician

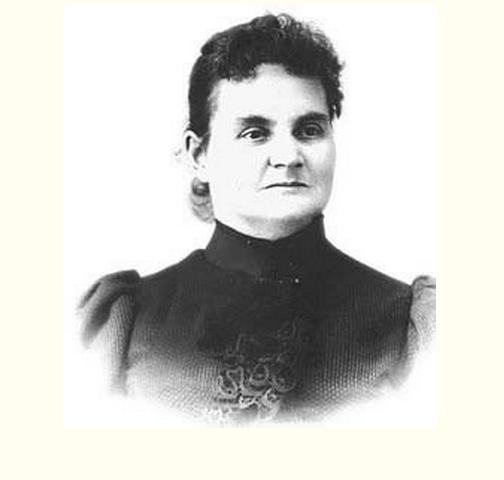
Pamela Case Hale: First woman elected as Thurston County's Superintendent of Public Schools

Pamela Case Hale (August 17, 1834 – 1915) was the first woman ever elected as Thurston County's Superintendent of Public Schools. She was married to Captain Calvin Hale. She was a noted suffragist, preacher, and businesswoman.

== History ==
Pamela Clark Tower (also spelled Pamelia and Permilia), born in Northampton, Massachusetts, August 17, 1834, was the daughter of Lewis Tower and Margaret White. The family later moved to Rochester, New York, where Margaret was active in an anti-slavery organization. The family were likely acquainted with fellow Rochester resident Susan B. Anthony: Anthony later visited Pamela when Anthony came to speak in Olympia, Washington Territory in 1871.

Pamela married Isaac Case, a schoolteacher. Their son, Charles, was born in 1859. The 1860 census shows the Case family living in a boarding house or school in Anderson, Kentucky with their 2-year-old son. Isaac died in 1871, and soon after that, the widowed Pamela Case had moved to Olympia, Washington Territory. She began teaching school in a private girls seminary located in Olympia and later at the private Union Academy.

Pamela met Calvin Hale and married him in 1872. Calvin Hale was himself an important citizen, serving for a time as Indian agent for the Washington Territory. Their home, the Captain Calvin and Pamela Hale House, is listed in the National and Local Registers.

Pamela continued teaching after her marriage. She was elected Thurston County's first woman superintendent of schools, serving in this capacity for six years. She was a member of, and preacher at, the Unitarian Church; a founding member of Olympia's chapter of the Women's Christian Temperance Union, and a founding member of the Woman's Club, one of the most important women's clubs in the nation. In 1881 she was appointed to the territorial Board of Education by Governor Newell.

When Pamela Case married Calvin Hale, he had three children by his first marriage, and she brought her son Charles into the household. Although the blended family was largely successful, Charles was briefly hospitalized in the insane asylum at Steilacoom, Washington, for imagining that the family was plotting against him. The Hales adopted Paul Eaton, an illegitimate son of pioneer Nathan Eaton, born in 1873, who thereafter went by the name Paul Eaton Hale. He died at an early age while attending Stanford University.

After Captain Hale's death in 1887, Pamela continued with her civic and business activities, co-founding and serving on the boards of Olympia Light and Power Company and the Olympia Hotel, and building the Hale Block, an important building in downtown Olympia. In 1891 she was listed as the wealthiest person in Thurston County.

Pamela Case Hale died in California in 1915.
