= Bigelow Neighborhood =

Coordinates: 47°03′01″N 122°53′25″W

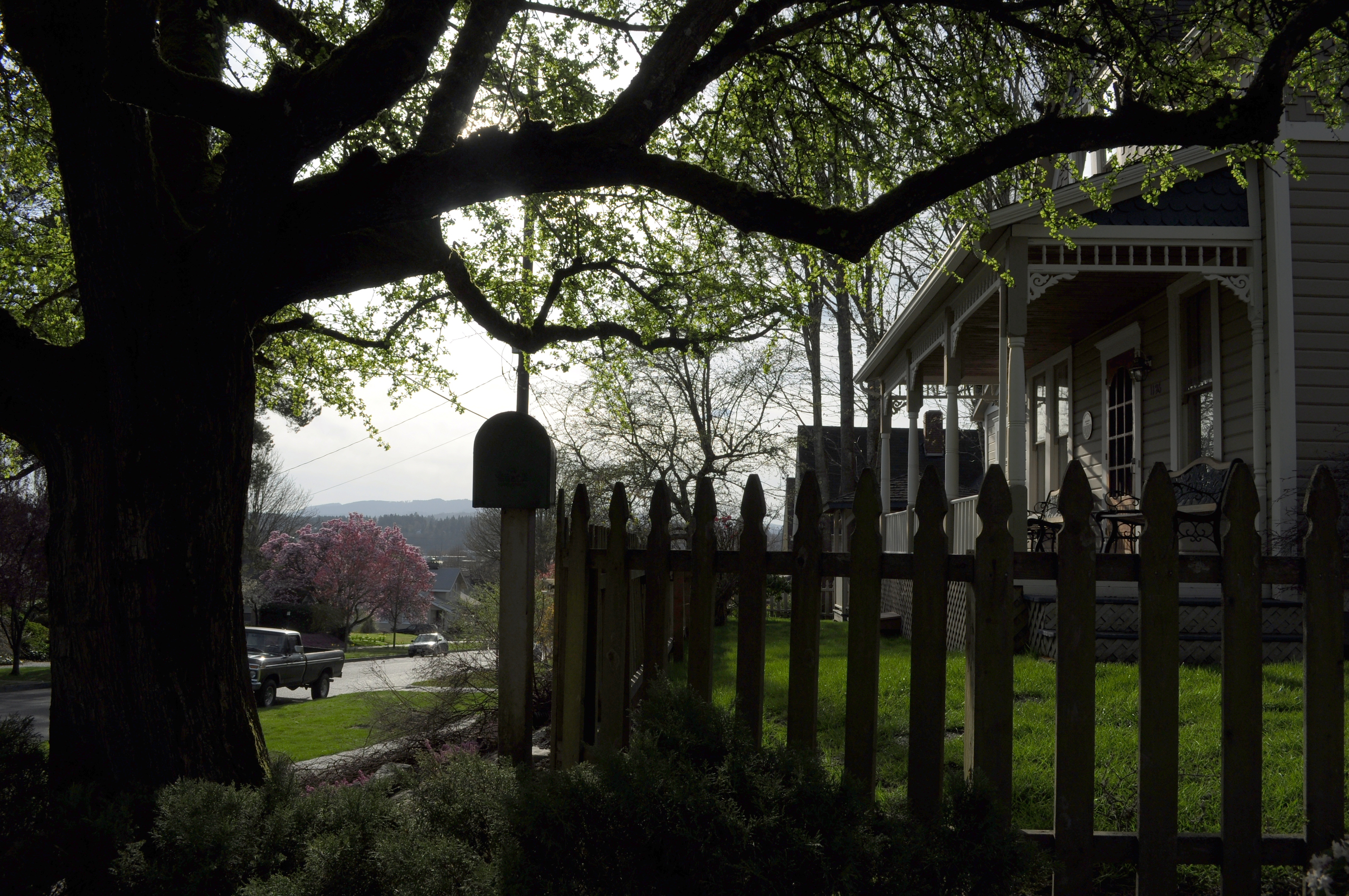
Bigelow Neighborhood, 2010

Bigelow Neighborhood, also called the Bigelow Historic District, is a historic district located on the eastside of Olympia, Washington. It is located along Olympia Avenue, between East Bay Drive and Tullis Street.

== History ==
The neighborhood is named after an early homesteader, Daniel Bigelow. His historic home, now the Bigelow House Museum, is located at 918 Glass Ave. and was listed on the National Register of Historic Places in 1987. There are several other historic houses in the neighborhood dating back to the late 19th and early 20th Centuries. Nearby Bigelow Park, located on part of the original Bigelow Donation Land Claim is among Olympia's oldest.

== See also ==
- History of Olympia, Washington
