= Cap-and-Invest (Washington state) =

US state program to fund climate action

Cap-and-Invest is a program run by the government of the US state of Washington to fund climate change policy through a carbon emissions trading system, commonly known as cap and trade.

== Program design ==
The Cap-and-Invest program was created by the Climate Commitment Act in 2021. Businesses that meet a threshold for carbon emissions must cover the full amount of their emissions for a set compliance period using instruments called allowances and offsets. Each instrument is equal to 1 metric ton of CO_{2} equivalent greenhouse gases. According to the law, businesses meeting certain criteria are given some allowances for free, but all businesses must obtain enough instruments to cover their entire emissions, either through auctions administered by the Department of Ecology, or through the secondary market. For example, during the initial compliance period natural gas utilities have been provided with free allowances covering 93% of their baseline emissions.

=== Linkage ===
The carbon market is designed with the intention to link with other carbon markets, such as California and Quebec's Western Climate Initiative (WCI). This would increase the size of the secondary market, making prices more stable and, in the short term, lowering prices.

In March 2026, a draft linkage agreement with the Western Climate Initiative was released. The agreement would create a framework to not only transfer compliance instruments between the three markets, but also to hold joint auctions across all three markets. California and Quebec's markets have been linked since January 1, 2014. Prices in California and Quebec's auctions have generally been lower than Washington's with the highest settlement price ever recorded being $42 per metric ton, whereas the highest settlement price in Washington's auction history was $70.86 per metric ton. According to two studies from Washington Department of Ecology and the University of California, linkage would align the prices of Washington carbon allowances with the lower and more stable WCI allowances. The CA-QC market is approximately six (6) times bigger than Washington's standalone market, so linkage would dramatically increase liquidity in the allowance market. After the governments signed a joint linkage agreement in mid-2026, the settlement prices in the CA-QC auctions rose from $28.81 in May to $32.48 in August. At the same time, settlement prices of Washington's auctions dramatically fell to near the price of CA-QC allowances.

As of Q3 2026, Washington state Department of Ecology had completed amending its rules to make its carbon market compatible with CA-QC and expected to operate a linked market in 2027.

=== Offsets ===
Offset credits represent a project that verifiably reduces at least one metric ton of greenhouse gases in Washington state. Unlike some other cap and trade programs, carbon offsets can only be used for a small percentage of a compliance entity's emissions: a maximum of 8% total with up to 5% from general offset credits and up to 3% from offset projects on federally recognized Tribal land. Additionally, all valid offsets used in Washington state's carbon market are "under the cap", meaning that for every offset created, an allowance is removed from issuance by Ecology, such that the total number of instruments available on the market remains the same. Offsets can only be purchased through the Compliance Instrument Tracking System Service (CITSS), the same digital tool used for conducting auctions and surrendering allowances.

As of 2026, the only types ("protocols") of offset projects approved by Ecology are:

- Destruction of Ozone Depleting Substances Protocol: Destruction of CFCs from heat pumps
- U.S. Forest Protocol: Derived from California's U.S. Forest Protocol
- Urban Forest Protocol: Planting trees in urban areas (based on California's Urban Forest Protocol)
- Livestock Protocol: Capturing methane on pig and cattle farms using specialized "digester" tanks

Blue carbon sequestration projects are being explored as an additional protocol as of 2026.

== Auctions and price history ==
=== Auctions ===
The program uses sealed-bid auctions, whereby the price that each participant bids is unknown to other participants. After bidding is closed, participants are allocated the number of allowances that they bid for, in order of highest price first, until all allowances have been accounted for. However, the price that all the successful participants actually pay (the settlement price) is the lowest successful bid price. Any participant who bid a price lower than the settlement price, will not receive any allowances at auction, and will instead have to purchase them on the secondary market. The Department of Ecology also establishes price floors and ceilings for allowances, increasing over time and adjusted for inflation. As of 2024, participants must bid in lots of 1,000 allowances. Given that the lowest settlement price (as of April 2026) that has ever occurred in a Washington state auction is $24.02, all participants that have successfully purchased allowances from the auction so far have paid at least $24,020.

Allowance Price Containment Reserve (APCR) auctions are intended to keep prices from escalating too quickly. These auctions are automatically called after an auction where prices rose above a certain threshold and they are only open to polluting entities. In an APCR auction, prices are fixed at Tier 1 (lower) and Tier 2 (higher) prices, and there are a set number of allowances up for auction in each tier.

Most allowances have a "vintage year," which is the earliest year that it can be used to cover a business' emissions. A limited number of allowances are sold in advance of their vintage year. Allowances with earlier vintage years can always be used in later years, but allowances cannot be used before their vintage year. For example, a 2027 vintage allowance cannot be used in 2026. Allowances sold in APCR auctions have no vintage and can be used in any year.

Because each allowance represents 1 metric ton of greenhouse gas emissions, the most recent auction prices can be used by businesses as a shorthand for gauging the "cost to pollute" charged by the state government.

==== Example auctions ====
For the following examples, a total of 5,000 allowances are up for auction, and 3 parties bid at auction. See Table 1-a for the simplest example, where the highest bidder receives all of the allowances they asked for, the lowest bidder receives none of them, and the middle bidder receives part of what they requested.

Table 1-a
Participant	Bid price	Bid amount	Price paid $/allowance	Allowances purchased	Total cost
A	$20	2,500	N/A	0	$0
B	$30	2,000	$30	1,000	$30,000
C	$40	4,000	$30	4,000	$120,000
Total	-	-	$30	5,000	$150,000

However, the lowest bidder may still get some allowances if not all of the allowances up for sale were allocated to the higher bidders. In the case of Table 1-b, because the auctioneer wants to sell as many allowances as possible, they will allocate the remaining allowances to the lowest bidder, even though this lowers the price that all participants pay for their allowances.

Table 1-b
Participant	Bid price	Bid amount	Price paid $/allowance	Allowances purchased	Total cost
A	$20	2,500	$20	2,000	$40,000
B	$30	2,000	$20	2,000	$40,000
C	$40	1,000	$20	1,000	$20,000
Total	-	-	$20	5,000	$100,000

In some cases, this can even reduce the total revenue generated by the auction. In Table 1-c, if the auctioneer had been able to allocate only 4,000 of the 5,000 allowances, then the settlement price would have stayed at $30. Instead, because the remaining 1,000 allowances had to be allocated to the lowest bidder, the settlement price for all participants was lowered to $20. This decreased the potential revenue from $120,000 ($30 x 4,000) to $100,000 ($20 x 5,000). The result is that the auction is designed to incentivize the availability of carbon allowances, even if the revenue generated for the government is lower.

Table 1-c
Participant	Bid price	Bid amount	Price paid $/allowance	Allowances purchased	Total cost
A	$20	2,000	$20	1,000	$20,000
B	$30	1,000	$20	1,000	$20,000
C	$40	3,000	$20	3,000	$60,000
Total	-	-	$20	5,000	$100,000

=== Impact of Initiative 2117 ===
At the 2024 meeting of the North American Carbon World, Director of the Washington State Department of Ecology, Laura Watson, suggested that the reason for the sudden drop in settlement price for carbon allowances in the first auction of the year was a result of the initiative getting on the ballot.

Analysts expected the first auction after I-2117 was voted down to see a significant increase in settlement price. These predictions were based on both the sizeable margin of defeat for the initiative and on the current price for allowances on secondary markets. On election night, secondary market prices jumped $10 to approximately $60. However, the December 2024 auction settled at only $40.26 with a bid-to-cover ratio of 1.15. Data showed that compliance entities were generally participating in lower numbers than expected, despite projections that there is an overall shortfall of allowances.

== Compliance ==
Businesses and other required reporting entities must cover all of their emissions with allowances and/or offset credits. Compliance is measured in four year compliance periods, the first of which covers 2023-2026. On the compliance deadline (November 1) following each year in a compliance period, entities must submit compliance instruments covering at least 30% of their emissions from the previous year. On the final compliance deadline in a compliance period, entities must submit compliance instruments covering all of their remaining emissions from the compliance period.

2023-2026 Compliance Period Schedule
Date	Required compliance amount	Vintage allowed	Compliance rate
November 1, 2024	30% of 2023 emissions	2023	99.996%
November 1, 2025	30% of 2024 emissions	2023-2024	99.995%
November 1, 2026	30% of 2025 emissions	2023-2025	
November 1, 2027	30% of 2026 emissions	2023-2026	
November 1, 2027	Remaining 70% of all 2023-2026 emissions	2023-2026	

November 1, 2024 marked the beginning of the program's compliance requirements. Required reporting entities had to submit documentation to the Department of Ecology that showed they had compliance instruments (allowances or offsets) covering at least 30% of their 2023 emissions. The 2023 compliance report showed a 99.996% compliance rate.

The Department of Ecology fined Climate Care Innovations, an offset project operator, $425,000 for falsely claiming that it owned over 3 million allowances. Offset project operators are not allowed to own allowances, and in reality they had no such allowances or offsets, according to Ecology. On February 11, 2025, their registration for the market was revoked.

On November 1, 2025, compliance entities were required to surrender instruments covering 30% of their 2024 emissions as well as any of their under-reported emissions from 2023, if applicable. The overall compliance rate was 99.995% with the vast majority of compliance instruments being allowances given or sold at auction by Ecology. Only 0.407% of instruments were offset credits from projects with direct environmental benefits to Washington state and not on Tribal land.

Cosmo Specialty Fibers, an abandoned pulp mill with 800,000 gallons of corrosive chemicals leaking out of storage tanks near the Chehalis River, was the only entity which did not fulfill its obligation of carbon allowances in 2023, and it failed to surrender the required allowances again in 2024. It was separately fined $2.3 million for pollution in 2025.

== Revenue and investments ==
=== Auction revenue accounts ===
The revenue generated from the sale of carbon allowances is deposited into three main accounts, plus four accounts that derive funding from the main accounts. Each account has different restrictions on how funds can be spent. All funding must first be appropriated by the Washington State Legislature from an account before it can be spent.

Account name	Required usage	Funding source
Carbon Emissions Reduction Account (CERA)	Reducing transportation emissions, investing in alternatives and reductions to single occupancy passenger vehicles, and investing in emissions reduction programs for freight, ferries, and ports	$367 million/yr from auction revenues
Climate Active Transportation Account	Active transportation projects	24% of CERA
Climate Transit Programs Account	Public transit projects	56% of CERA
Air Quality Health Disparities Improvement Account	Expanding air monitoring in overburdened communities highly impacted by air pollution, and reducing health disparities in those communities	>$20 million/yr from auction revenues
Climate Investment Account (CIA)	First used to fund administration of Cap-and-Invest program, capped at 5% of total auction revenues	All remaining auction revenues
Climate Commitment Account	Supporting Washington's transition to a low-carbon economy, improve air quality, and increase access to clean energy for Washington residents	75% of CIA after admin costs
Natural Climate Solutions Account	Protecting fish and wildlife habitats, improve aquatic ecosystems and water quality, and protect against floods	25% of CIA after admin costs

During 2026's budget session, Governor Bob Ferguson proposed raiding the CCA accounts of more than half a billion dollars to pay for working families tax credits. The final budget diverted $546 million in CCA funding to fill budget gaps. The Climate Investment Account (CIA) and its two children: the Climate Commitment Account and the Natural Climate Solutions Account were repealed and replaced with the CCA (Operating) and CCA (Capital) accounts.

=== Investments ===
For fiscal year 2023 (FY23), which started on July 1, 2022 and ended on June 30, 2023, the Washington state legislature appropriated $76 million from CCA accounts. For the 2023-25 biennium budget, total appropriations jumped to $3.2 billion. However, in the fiscal year ending in June 2024, only 15% of appropriations had been spent, potentially due to the threat of I-2117.

Fiscal Years (Note: Fiscal year is defined as starting the prior July 1 and going through June 30 of that calendar year (e.g., FY24 starts July 1, 2023 and ends June 30, 2024))	Total appropriations	Total expenditures	Benefits overburdened communities (OBC) >= 35% / biennium	Supported by Tribal resolution >= 10% / biennium	Ref
FY23	$76 M	$54 M	Not required to report		
FY24	-	$478 M	$289 M	$1 M	
FY25	-	$1,022 M	$560 M	$54 M	
Total FY24-25	$2,752 M	$1,500 M	57% ($849 M)	4% ($55 M)	

=== Climate justice provisions ===
The Climate Commitment Act requires that a minimum of 35%, with a stated goal of 40%, of auction proceeds be used for climate justice, meaning projects that benefit overburdened communities, defined as:

“a geographic area where vulnerable populations face combined, multiple environmental harms and health impacts or risks due to exposure to environmental pollutants or contaminants through multiple pathways, which may result in significant disparate adverse health outcomes or effects.”

Additionally, at least 10% of investments must go towards projects formally supported by an Indian tribe.

For air pollution mitigation projects, Department of Ecology identified 16 areas which were both overburdened and highly impacted by air pollution. The results of this study were used as eligibility criteria for $10 million offered in Air quality in overburdened communities grants.

In the first full biennium where CCA funds were distributed, Ecology far surpassed the minimum of 35% spending benefiting overburdened communities with 57% of revenue spent on OBCs. However, the amount of spending on projects supported by a Tribal resolution fell short of the required 10%, reaching only 4%.

=== Spending by agency ===
Agency	2023-25	2025-2027
Transportation	$522 M	
Commerce	$488 M	
Natural Resources	$168 M	
Ecology	$83 M	
Health	$44 M	
Washington Conservation Corps	$33 M	
University of Washington	$23 M	
Recreation and Conservation Office	$17 M	
Transportation Improvement Board	$17 M	
Washington State University	$14 M	
Department of Enterprise Services	$14 M	
Office of Superintendent of Public Instruction	$13 M	
All other agencies combined	$62 M	

=== Example investments from 2023-25 biennium ===
- Free public transit (bus, Link light rail, commuter rail, ferry, Amtrak Cascades) for all youth age 18 and under.
- One time $200 rebate on electricity bill for low-to-medium income households.
- E-bike instant rebate program ($5 M).
- Financial assistance for purchasing heat pumps and installing insulated windows.
- Move Ahead WA public transportation grant programs ($3,000M/16yr)
- Building 5,000 new EV charging stations ($85 M)
- Electrifying Guemes Island Ferry ($34 M)
- Replacing the boilers at the Kaiser Aluminum plant in Spokane ($5 M).
- Air quality in overburdened communities grants ($10 M)
- Pedestrian bridge spanning I-5 to access Shoreline South/148th St Link light rail station.
- Climate and Health Adaptation Initiative (CHAI)
- Improving Air Quality in Overburdened Communities

== See also ==
- Climate change policy of Washington (state)
- List of Western Climate Initiative auctions
- Emissions trading
- Cap and trade
- Jay Inslee
