= Hambrecht & Quist =

American investment bank

- Industry: Investment bank
- Founded: 1968
- Founders: Bill Hambrecht, George Quist
- Fate: Acquired by Chase Manhattan Bank in 1999

Hambrecht & Quist (H&Q) was an investment bank based in San Francisco, California noted for its focus on the technology and Internet sectors. H&Q was founded by Bill Hambrecht and George Quist in California, in 1968.

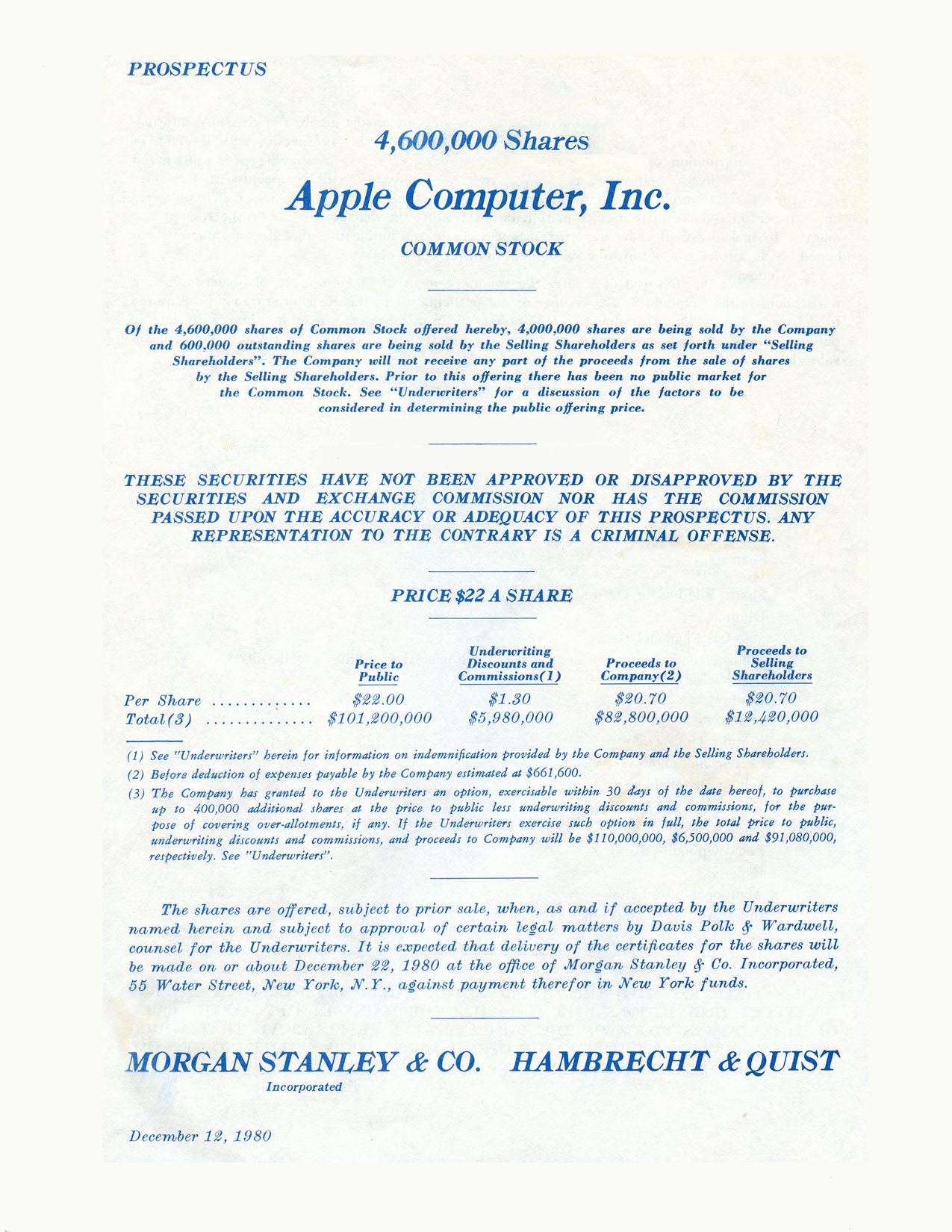
Apple Computer IPO 1980

H&Q was an early player in the technology sector, underwriting initial public offerings (IPOs) for Apple Computer, Genentech, and Adobe Systems in the 1980s. In the 1990s, H&Q also backed the IPOs of Netscape, MP3.com, and Amazon.com.

Competition in the investment banking industry in the late 1990s limited H&Q's ability to grow as an independent firm, and in 1999, Hambrecht & Quist was acquired for $1.35 billion by Chase Manhattan Bank. H&Q was originally to be renamed "Chase Securities West" but ultimately was renamed "Chase H&Q" after marketing research revealed the H&Q brand name was still valuable. This unit eventually lost the H&Q name and became part of JPMorgan Chase. The H&Q name lives on in the closed-end healthcare funds managed by Hambrecht & Quist Capital Management in Boston.

After leaving H&Q, founder Hambrecht popularized the "OpenIPO" model, in which Dutch auctions allowed anyone, not just investing insiders, to buy stock in an IPO, potentially raising more money for startups. Among the companies that adopted this model were Overstock.com, Ravenswood Winery, and Salon Media Group.

== See also ==
- WR Hambrecht + Co, an investment bank founded by William Hambrecht after acquisition of H&Q
- H&Q Asia Pacific, a private equity firm focused on Asian markets
