= Lilian Hale =

American student (born 2006)

Member of the Washington House of Representatives from the 19th district
- In office March 7, 2024 – March 8, 2024
- Preceded by: Joel McEntire
- Succeeded by: Joel McEntire

Personal details
- Born: March 7, 2006 (age 20)
- Party: Republican
- Relatives: Joel McEntire (stepfather)
- Education: Lower Columbia College

Lilian Hale (born March 7, 2006) is an American student who briefly served as a member of the Washington House of Representatives in March 2024. She took over after her stepfather, Joel McEntire, who was ordered to report for mandatory military duty. Hale was sworn in on her 18th birthday, making her the youngest legislator in Washington state history (Note: Attributed to multiple sources.) and possibly in the United States. (Note: Attributed to multiple sources.) Since her tenure in the state legislature, she has stated that she does not plan to pursue a career in politics, and instead in nursing, aiming to work in either hospice or childbirth.

== Early life and education (2006–2024) ==
Hale was born on March 7, 2006. Her stepfather is Joel McEntire, a Washington state representative. Hale attended Wahkiakum High School, where she was an active wrestler. In January 2024, Hale placed sixth in the Braided 64 held at Kelso. Later that month, she was the champion of the 155-pound weight division at the 30th Lumberjack and Lumberjill Classic competition. In her last two years of high school, she participated in the Running Start program, allowing her to study nursing at Lower Columbia College while in high school. She graduated from high school in 2024 and received an associate's degree from Lower Columbia. According to a 2024 article in the Wahkiakum County Eagle, Hale planned to enroll at St. Martin's University, seeking to receive a Bachelor of Science in nursing. At the time of her inauguration to the House, she resided in Cathlamet.

== Washington House of Representatives (2024) ==
During her brief legislatorial career, Hale represented the 19th district in the Washington House of Representatives (map pictured)

In February 2024, McEntire, a U.S. Marine Corps reservist, was ordered to report for mandatory military duty from March 5 to 8. The state of Washington allows for an interim successor to be chosen for legislators on leave for military service or training. McEntire had selected Hale as his replacement over Hale's mother, who had just given birth. McEntire submitted resolutions requesting a leave of absence to the six counties his district, the 19th, represents: Cowlitz, Grays Harbor, Lewis, Pacific, Thurston, and Wahkiakum. By February 29, all six counties had approved the resolution.

McEntire initially wanted Hale to hold the seat for the entire three days that he was gone; however, Hale did not turn 18 – the minimum age required to hold a seat in the state legislature – until March 7 and would therefore be unable to serve for two of the days. After seeking advice from state experts, he agreed to Hale being sworn in on her birthday instead of March 5. She was officially sworn in on March 7, 2024, as a Republican, which also happened to be the last day of regular session. Upon her inauguration, Hale became the youngest legislator in Washington history, with some media outlets describing her as possibly the youngest state legislator in United States history. She also became the first replacement for a state representative on military leave. (Note: In the Washington Senate, interim replacements had been appointed twice before: Lela Kreidler, replacing Mike Kreidler for three months in 1991; and Marlo Braun, replacing John Braun for a week in 2017.) During her brief tenure in the House, Hale voted on several measures. She was the only representative to vote against Senate Bill No. 5180, a bill that would make Washington a member of the Interstate Teacher Mobility Compact, allowing teachers to work in different states without additional licensing. McEntire returned to the legislature on March 8.

== Post-legislature career (2024–present) ==
Hale stated that she does not wish to pursue a career in politics and that serving as a replacement for McEntire was "the least [she] can do" for him "while he is on leave for military service." According to a 2024 article in the Wahkiakum County Eagle, she is aspiring to be a registered nurse and work in either hospice or childbirth.

== Notes and references ==
Notes
