= 2006 Washington Initiative 937 =

Initiative measure no. 937
- Clean Energy Initiative

Results
Choice	Votes	%
Yes	1,042,679	51.73%
No	972,747	48.27%
County results
Yes: 50–60% 60–70%	No: 50–60% 60–70% 70–80%

Ballot Initiative 937 (official name Initiative measure no. 937, known as I-937) is a renewable energy initiative passed in the US state of Washington, appearing on the ballot in the November 2006 elections. It passed with 52 percent of the vote.

== Content of the proposal ==
The initiative requires large utilities to obtain 15% of their electricity from new renewable resources such as solar and wind (but excluding hydro) by 2020 with incremental steps of 3% by 2012 and 9% by 2016. It also requires that utilities undertake all cost-effective energy conservation.

== Precedents ==
Similar legislation has been enacted in at least 20 other states including the following. (The table is sorted by date and then by descending percentage. I-937 is included in bold.)

State	Name	Enacted	Percentage	By	Comments/Source
Maine			30%	2000	
Arizona			1.1%	2007	
Massachusetts			4%	2009	
Connecticut			10%	2010	
Iowa			~10%	2010	
New Mexico			10%	2011	
New York			24%	2013	
Nevada			20%	2015	
Minnesota			19%	2015	
Montana			15%	2015	
Colorado	Amendment 37	2004	10%	2015	First ballot initiative
Texas			~4.2%	2015	5.88 GW
California			20%	2017	
Rhode Island			16%	2019	
Delaware			10%	2019	
Maryland			7.5%	2019	
New Jersey			22.5%	2020	
Hawaii			20%	2020	
**Washington**	**I-937**		**15%**	**2020**	
Washington, D.C.			11%	2022	
Pennsylvania			8%	2020	

Unless indicated otherwise, data are from

== Supporters ==
Supporters included the following:

=== Elected officials ===
- U.S. Senators Maria Cantwell and Patty Murray
- U.S. Congressmen Jay Inslee, Adam Smith, Norm Dicks and Jim McDermott
- State Senators Luke Esser (R), Dave Schmidt (R), Debbie Regala (D), Bill Finkbeiner (R), Erik Poulsen (D), Karen Fraser (D), Craig Pridemore (D), Jeanne Kohl-Welles (D), Karen Keiser (D)
- State Representatives Toby Nixon (R), Zack Hudgins (D), Brian J. Sullivan (D), Fred Jarrett (R), Pat Sullivan (D), Geoff Simpson (D), Rodney Tom (D), Dave Upthegrove (D), Brendan Williams (D)
- King County Executive Ron Sims
- Seattle Mayor Greg Nickels

=== Civic and political organizations ===
- League of Women Voters
- Kittitas Valley League of Women voters
- Washington State Democrats
- King County Young Democrats
- Republicans for Environmental Protection, Washington Chapter
- Green Party of Washington State
- Peace Action for Washington

=== Health organizations ===
- American Lung Association
- American Cancer Society
- Washington Physicians for Social Responsibility

=== Energy and labor ===
- Washington Public Utility Districts Association
- Washington State Labor Council
- United Steelworkers
- SEIU Washington State Council

=== Environmental ===
- Denis Hayes, Founder of Earth Day
- NW Energy Coalition
- Audubon Society Washington
- The Mountaineers
- Sierra Club - Cascade Chapter
- Washington Conservation Voters
- Union of Concerned Scientists
- Natural Resources Defense Council
- National Wildlife Federation

=== Faith ===
- Earth Ministry
- Lutheran Public Policy Office of Washington
- Washington Association of Churches
- Church Council of Greater Seattle

=== Newspapers ===
- The Seattle P-I
- The Olympian
- The Tacoma News Tribune
- The Stranger

== Opponents ==
Opponents included many small co-op electrical providers (even though the initiative affects only utilities with greater than 25,000 customers) as well as the following:

- Big Bend Electrical Cooperative
- Boeing
- Boise Cascade
- Chamber of Commerces: Bellevue, Greater Seattle, Kelso-Longview, Pasco, Spokane Regional, Tacoma-Pierce County, Wenatchee Valley, West Richland Area
- Modern Electric Water Company
- National Association of Manufacturers
- Peninsula Light Company
- PUDs of Benton, Cowlitz, Franklin, Lewis, and Mason County.
- Representatives Brian Blake (D) and Dean Takko (D)
- Senators Jean Berkey (D) and Mark L. Doumit (D)
- Tanner Electric Cooperative
- U.S. Chamber of Commerce
- Washington Farm Bureau
- Washington Rural Electric Cooperative Association
- Weyerhaeuser

== Results ==
2006 Washington Initiative 937
Choice	Votes	%
For	1,042,679	51.73
Against	972,747	48.27
Total	2,015,426	100.00
Source: Washington Secretary of State

=== By county ===
County results
County	Yes		No		Margin		Total votes
County	#	%	#	%	#	%	Total votes
Adams	1,235	36.33%	2,164	63.67%	-929	-27.33%	3,399
Asotin	3,351	47.06%	3,769	52.94%	-418	-5.87%	7,120
Benton	15,923	33.08%	32,205	66.92%	-16,282	-33.83%	48,128
Chelan	7,073	31.52%	15,364	68.48%	-8,291	-36.95%	22,437
Clallam	15,247	51.87%	14,150	48.13%	1,097	3.73%	29,397
Clark	57,446	51.77%	53,513	48.23%	3,933	3.54%	110,959
Columbia	608	32.85%	1,243	67.15%	-635	-34.31%	1,851
Cowlitz	12,697	42.24%	17,362	57.76%	-4,665	-15.52%	30,059
Douglas	2,841	26.44%	7,904	73.56%	-5,063	-47.12%	10,745
Ferry	1,249	46.40%	1,443	53.60%	-194	-7.21%	2,692
Franklin	4,093	32.95%	8,329	67.05%	-4,236	-34.10%	12,422
Garfield	406	35.93%	724	64.07%	-318	-28.14%	1,130
Grant	5,381	27.97%	13,857	72.03%	-8,476	-44.06%	19,238
Grays Harbor	8,684	40.28%	12,874	59.72%	-4,190	-19.44%	21,558
Island	15,898	54.37%	13,345	45.63%	2,553	8.73%	29,243
Jefferson	9,860	62.84%	5,830	37.16%	4,030	25.69%	15,690
King	363,093	59.61%	246,007	40.39%	117,086	19.22%	609,100
Kitsap	47,392	53.47%	41,248	46.53%	6,144	6.93%	88,640
Kittitas	5,719	47.91%	6,217	52.09%	-498	-4.17%	11,936
Klickitat	3,741	52.31%	3,411	47.69%	330	4.61%	7,152
Lewis	9,508	38.69%	15,067	61.31%	-5,559	-22.62%	24,575
Lincoln	1,468	32.23%	3,087	67.77%	-1,619	-35.54%	4,555
Mason	8,995	43.22%	11,816	56.78%	-2,821	-13.56%	20,811
Okanogan	4,890	39.31%	7,549	60.69%	-2,659	-21.38%	12,439
Pacific	4,314	51.65%	4,038	48.35%	276	3.30%	8,352
Pend Oreille	1,893	37.91%	3,101	62.09%	-1,208	-24.19%	4,994
Pierce	105,093	51.15%	100,362	48.85%	4,731	2.30%	205,455
San Juan	4,768	59.57%	3,236	40.43%	1,532	19.14%	8,004
Skagit	17,575	44.75%	21,701	55.25%	-4,126	-10.51%	39,276
Skamania	2,123	54.51%	1,772	45.49%	351	9.01%	3,895
Snohomish	99,897	50.18%	99,164	49.82%	733	0.37%	199,061
Spokane	71,732	47.63%	78,858	52.37%	-7,126	-4.73%	150,590
Stevens	6,601	39.88%	9,953	60.12%	-3,352	-20.25%	16,554
Thurston	46,980	57.07%	35,341	42.93%	11,639	14.14%	82,321
Wahkiakum	750	43.86%	960	56.14%	-210	-12.28%	1,710
Walla Walla	7,001	40.49%	10,291	59.51%	-3,290	-19.03%	17,292
Whatcom	37,178	55.45%	29,873	44.55%	7,305	10.89%	67,051
Whitman	6,065	47.90%	6,597	52.10%	-532	-4.20%	12,662
Yakima	23,911	45.17%	29,022	54.83%	-5,111	-9.66%	52,933
Totals	1,042,679	51.73%	972,747	48.27%	69,932	3.47%	2,015,426
