= JD Rossetti =

American politician

Member of the Washington House of Representatives from the 19th district
- In office October 22, 2015 – December 8, 2016
- Preceded by: Dean Takko
- Succeeded by: Jim Walsh

Longview School District Director, Position No. 2
- In office December 9, 2013 – December 11, 2017
- Preceded by: James Campbell
- Succeeded by: Phil Jumru

Personal details
- Born: Justin Daniel Rossetti; November 12, 1981 (age 44) Hillsboro, Oregon, U.S.
- Party: Democratic
- Spouse(s): Rebekah (Hauck) Rossetti (2006-2009); Amber Rosewood (2012-2016)
- Children: 2
- Education: Lower Columbia College (AA); Washington State University (BA)
- Profession: Campaign consultant Campaign manager Legislative assistant
- Website: Official Legislative; Official School Board

Justin Daniel Rossetti (born November 12, 1981) is an American politician of the who served as a member of the Washington House of Representatives, representing the 19th district from 2015 to 2016. A member of the Democratic Party, Rossetti was appointed to the state legislature on October 22, 2015, in the 19th Legislative District. JD Rossetti filled the vacancy left after then-State Representative Dean Takko was appointed to the Washington State Senate, after State Senator Brian Hatfield had resigned to take the position of Sector Lead for Rural Economic Development in Governor Inslee's administration. Rossetti was elected in 2013 as a Director on Longview School District's Board of Education.

Rossetti retired from the Longview School Board and in 2017 and was succeeded by Phil Jumru.

The Speaker of the House has appointed Rossetti to the Community Economic Revitalization Board, which helps local governments and tribes fund projects that create jobs. Those projects include broadband access, water lines, stormwater systems, port facilities and other public structures that support economic growth.

== Legislative proposals ==
Rossetti has introduced numerous legislative proposals as a leader in advocacy on Capitol Hill and in Western State Legislatures. Some legislative proposals introduced by JD Rossetti include:

- House Bill 2847 - Disability Retrofitting
- House Bill 2651 – Concerning Vehicle Maximum gross weights
- House Bill 2725 – Pharmacist Authority
- House Bill 2296 - Concerning the taxing authority of public facilities districts
- House Bill 2446 – Concerning citizens participating in workgroups
