= Doumit =

Doumit (Arabic: ضومط) is a surname of Lebanese origin. Notable people with the surname include:

- Mark Doumit (1961–2021), American politician
- Sam Doumit (born 1975), American actress
- Ryan Doumit (born 1981), American baseball player
- Claudia Doumit (born 1992), Australian actress known for Timeless
