= List of Western Climate Initiative auctions =

The Western Climate Initiative is a coalition of regional governments cooperating to organize a carbon emissions trading scheme. As of 2026, the participating entities are the American states of California and Washington and the Canadian province of Quebec.

== Auction history ==
=== Terminology ===
- CE (Compliance entities): Businesses or organizations who are required to report their emissions
- SP (Settlement price): Lowest price of a successful bid in a sealed-bid auction. All successful bids pay this price.
  - All prices are demarcated in US dollars. For joint Canadian/US auctions, the official USD settlement was used.
  - For Quebec-only auctions, a historic conversion rate was used. (Note: For QC only auctions, the following conversions from CAD to USD were used: in 2013, 1 CAD = 0.97 USD; in 2014, 1 CAD = 0.91 USD)
- HHI (Hirfindahl-Hirschman Index): Measures concentration of market share in a score out of 10,000 basis points.
  - Calculated by summing the squares of the percentage market share of each participant.
  - Usually multiplied by 10,000 for ease of reporting (e.g., 0.1133 ⟶ 1133)
- BR (Bid ratio): Total number of submitted bids weighted by number of allowances divided by number of allowances offered.
  - Bid ratio of <1.0 means that not all the allowances offered were sold. When this happens in WCI auctions, the allowances that are sold go for the minimum price.
  - Bid ratio of >=1.0 means that all allowances offered were sold.
- APCR (Allowance Price Containment Reserve): Washington's auction format allowed for special auctions to be held if the settlement breached a certain threshold. In these auctions, only compliance entities would be allowed to bid and the price would be fixed at a predetermined rate.
- UD (Undisclosed): If there are too few entities bidding in an auction, the government may choose not to disclose the percentage of bids made by compliance entities to protect their privacy.

Settlement prices in auctions from 2014-2026

=== Market dynamics ===
Despite the similarity in structure of the auctions offered by Washington versus those offered jointly by Quebec and California, they have exhibited very different trends in both settlement prices themselves and relationship between current and advance vintage settlement prices. For most of the QC/CA auction's history, settlement prices for current and advance auctions have stayed close to the minimum price and have moved in tandem. As of Feb 2026, there were only five instances (Nov 2021, Feb 2022, May 2022, Aug 2022, Nov 2024) out of 44 joint QC/CA auctions where the variance of the current and advance vintage settlement prices was greater than 1. By contrast, Washington's auctions, which debuted in 2023, have almost never had a settlement price close to the minimum price, and in later years the settlement prices of current and advance auctions have diverged widely.

Some analysts have attributed the premium placed on Washington carbon allowances to the lack of surplus in allowances compared to the QC/CA market. Both pro-CCA politicians and compliance entities have suggested that linkage with the three markets would bring down the price of allowances by giving Washington access to a much larger secondary market. When the Climate Commitment Act was passed, the fiscal note provided to legislators assumed that the program would be linked with QC/CA from the start. After it became clear that initial linkage would not happen, Washington Department of Ecology commissioned a forecast that predicted an average auction price of $63.92 in 2023 dollars, which ended up being an overestimate compared to the actual weighted average of $56.72.

=== History ===
California and Quebec linked in 2014

Date	Gov	Type	Vintage		SP	Allow. sold	Proceeds ($M)	CE%	BR	HHI
Date	Gov	Type	min	max	SP	Allow. sold	Proceeds ($M)	CE%	BR	HHI
2012-11-14	CA	Current	2013	2013	$10.09	23,126,110	$233.3	97.0%	1.06	1133
2012-11-14	CA	Advance	2015	2015	$10.00	5,576,000	$55.8	91.0%	0.14	1485
2013-02-19	CA	Current	2013	2013	$13.62	12,924,822	$176.0	88.2%	2.49	728
2013-02-19	CA	Advance	2016	2016	$10.71	4,440,000	$47.6	100.0%	0.46	3159
2013-05-16	CA	Current	2013	2013	$14.00	14,522,048	$203.3	90.2%	1.78	609
2013-05-16	CA	Advance	2016	2016	$10.71	7,515,000	$80.5	86.5%	0.79	1198
2013-08-01	CA	Current	2013	2013	$12.22	13,865,422	$169.4	95.5%	1.62	861
2013-08-01	CA	Advance	2016	2016	$11.10	9,560,000	$106.1	96.3%	1.69	1605
2013-11-01	CA	Current	2013	2013	$11.48	16,614,526	$190.7	96.2%	1.82	683
2013-11-01	CA	Advance	2016	2016	$11.10	9,560,000	$106.1	91.3%	1.64	1165
2014-02-19	CA	Current	2014	2014	$11.48	19,538,695	$224.3	84.5%	1.27	533
2014-02-19	CA	Advance	2017	2017	$11.38	9,260,000	$105.4	83.5%	1.11	1568
2014-05-16	CA	Current	2014	2014	$11.50	16,947,080	$194.9	89.5%	1.46	482
2014-05-16	CA	Advance	2017	2017	$11.34	4,036,000	$45.8	100.0%	0.44	1439
2014-08-18	CA	Current	2014	2014	$11.50	22,473,043	$258.4	87.7%	1.14	618
2014-08-18	CA	Advance	2017	2017	$11.34	6,470,000	$73.4	89.2%	0.70	1937
2013-12-01	QC	Current	2013	2013	$10.43	1,025,000	$10.67	UD	0.34	1984
2013-12-01	QC	Advance	2016	2016	$10.43	1,708,000	$17.8	UD	0.27	8575
2014-03-01	QC	Current	2014	2014	$10.36	1,035,000	$10.7	UD	0.99	1415
2014-03-01	QC	Advance	2017	2017	$10.36	1,285,000	$13.6	UD	0.84	2319
2014-05-01	QC	Current	2014	2014	$10.36	1,049,111	$10.8	UD	1.02	2147
2014-05-01	QC	Advance	2017	2017	$10.36	1,302,000	$13.5	UD	0.85	2260
2014-08-01	QC	Current	2014	2014	$10.36	694,000	$7.2	UD	0.66	1422
2014-08-01	QC	Advance	2017	2017	$10.36	1,455,000	$15.1	UD	0.95	1846
2023-02-28	WA	Current	2023	2023	$48.50	6,185,222	$300.0	-	2.67	669
2023-05-31	WA	Current	2023	2023	$56.01	8,585,000	$480.8	89.88%	1.95	631
2023-05-31	WA	Advance	2026	2026	$31.12	2,450,000	$76.2	73.55%	1.44	756
2023-08-01	WA	APCR Tier 1	N/A	N/A	$51.90	527,000	$27.4	100.0%	12.79	1315
2023-08-01	WA	APCR Tier 2	N/A	N/A	$66.68	527,000	$35.1	100.0%	3.11	1315
2023-08-01	WA	Current	2023	2023	$63.03	5,657,651	$356.6	85.46%	1.79	623
2023-11-01	WA	APCR Tier 1	N/A	N/A	$51.90	5,000,000	$259.5	100%	3.20	2098
2023-12-06	WA	Current	2023	2023	$51.89	7,142,146	$370.6	87.00%	1.48	592
2023-12-06	WA	Advance	2026	2026	$45.00	2,449,760	$110.2	69.20%	1.66	692
2024-03-06	WA	Current	2023	2024	$25.76	7,442,241	$191.7	91.31%	1.24	697
2024-06-05	WA	Current	2023	2024	$29.92	7,802,337	$233.4	89.41%	1.25	697
2024-06-05	WA	Advance	2027	2027	$24.02	1,317,000	$31.6	56.04%	0.60	991
2024-09-01	WA	Current	2023	2024	$29.88	7,939,271	$237.2	83.20%	1.20	635
2024-10-01	WA	APCR Tier 1	N/A	N/A	$56.16	1,022,000	$57.4	100.0%	0.34	?
2024-12-08	WA	Current	2023	2024	$40.26	7,985,130	$321.5	75.58%	1.15	597
2024-12-08	WA	Advance	2027	2027	$26.00	2,222,832	$57.8	61.49%	1.14	696
2025-03-05	WA	Current	2023	2025	$50.00	7,346,095	$367.3	81.99%	2.29	996
2025-06-04	WA	Current	2024	2025	$58.51	6,754,086	$395.2	93.26%	2.44	1171
2025-06-01	WA	Advance	2028	2028	$26.61	2,000,000	$53.2	66.65%	1.08	1081
2025-09-03	WA	Current	2024	2025	$64.30	6,937,001	$446.0	92.69%	2.41	1,093
2025-10-01	WA	APCR Tier 1	N/A	N/A	$60.43	3,641,333	$220.0	100.0%	4.22	1561
2025-11-01	WA	APCR Tier 1	N/A	N/A	$60.43	3,641,333	$220.0	100.0%	6.15	1165
2025-12-03	WA	Current	2024	2025	$70.86	7,424,390	$526.1	86.93%	1.96	906
2025-12-01	WA	Advance	2028	2028	$29.40	1,945,905	$57.2	71.43%	1.72	1046
2026-02-01	WA	APCR Tier 1	N/A	N/A	$60.43	3,641,333	$220.0	100.0%	7.20	1054
2026-03-04	WA	Current	2023	2026	$65.26	5,315,841	$346.9	86.61%	1.76	1013
2026-05-20	WA	APCR Tier 1	N/A	N/A	$65.26	129,262	$8.4	100.0%	7.79	1204
2026-06-03	WA	Current	2024	2026	$64.56	4,919,327	$317.6	88.49%	1.74	1388
2026-06-03	WA	Advance	2029	2029	$30.00	1,750,000	$52.5	62.57%	1.90	1024
2026-09-02	WA	Current	2023	2026	$39.50	6,284,205	$248.2	79.19%	1.88	657
2026-09-16	WA	ECR	2023	2023	$39.50	731,000			2.11	1553
2026-09-30	WA	APCR Tier 1	N/A	N/A	$65.26	0	$0			
2014-11-01	CA,QC	Current	2014	2014	$12.10	23,070,987	$279.2	97.6%	1.73	627
2014-11-01	CA,QC	Advance	2017	2017	$11.86	10,787,000	$127.9	85.2%	1.92	1183
2015-02-01	CA,QC	Current	2015	2015	$12.21	73,610,528	$898.8	93.5%	1.14	524
2015-02-01	CA,QC	Advance	2018	2018	$12.10	10,431,500	$126.2	95.1%	1.02	1436
2015-05-01	CA,QC	Current	2013	2015	$12.29	76,931,627	$945.5	93.6%	1.16	478
2015-05-01	CA,QC	Advance	2018	2018	$12.10	9,812,000	$118.7	91.6%	0.94	1381
2015-08-01	CA,QC	Current	2015	2015	$12.52	73,429,360	$919.3	95.2%	1.28	597
2015-08-01	CA,QC	Advance	2018	2018	$12.30	10,431,500	$128.3	93.6%	1.78	1693
2015-11-01	CA,QC	Current	2015	2015	$12.73	75,113,008	$956.2	89.3%	1.14	619
2015-11-01	CA,QC	Advance	2018	2018	$12.65	10,431,500	$132.0	94.0%	1.32	1454
2016-02-17	CA,QC	Current	2013	2016	$12.73	68,026,000	$866.0	97.5%	0.951	819
2016-02-17	CA,QC	Advance	2019	2019	$12.73	9,361,000	$119.2	99.97%	0.929	1447
2016-05-18	CA,QC	Current	2016	2016	$12.73	7,260,000	$92.4	99.8%	0.11	2780
2016-05-18	CA,QC	Advance	2019	2019	$12.73	914,000	$11.6	100.0%	0.09	6313
2016-08-16	CA,QC	Current	2016	2016	$12.73	30,021,000	$382.2	91.5%	0.35	1210
2016-08-16	CA,QC	Advance	2019	2019	$12.73	769,000	$9.8	100.0%	0.08	5758
2016-11-15	CA,QC	Current	2016	2016	$12.73	76,960,000	$979.7	89.9%	0.88	600
2016-11-15	CA,QC	Advance	2019	2019	$12.73	1,020,000	$13.0	60.8%	0.10	2628
2017-02-22	CA,QC	Current	2014	2017	$13.57	11,673,000	$158.4	98.5%	0.18	2037
2017-02-22	CA,QC	Advance	2020	2020	$13.57	701,000	$9.5	92.9%	0.07	5903
2017-05-16	CA,QC	Current	2017	2017	$13.80	75,311,960	$1,039.3	90.4%	1.23	793
2017-05-16	CA,QC	Advance	2020	2020	$13.57	2,117,000	$28.7	82.3%	0.22	4483
2017-11-14	CA,QC	Current	2016	2017	$15.06	79,548,286	$1,198.0	96.5%	1.37	918
2017-11-14	CA,QC	Advance	2020	2020	$14.76	9,723,500	$143.5	92.3%	1.27	1453
2018-02-21	CA,QC	Current	2016	2018	$14.61	98,215,920	$1,434.9	92.1%	1.21	436
2018-02-21	CA,QC	Advance	2021	2021	$14.53	8,576,000	$124.6	89.0%	0.69	1727
2018-05-15	CA,QC	Current	2016	2018	$14.65	90,587,738	$1,327.1	95.6%	1.36	668
2018-05-15	CA,QC	Advance	2021	2021	$14.53	6,057,000	$88.0	77.7%	0.49	1444
2018-08-14	CA,QC	Current	2016	2018	$15.05	79,421,265	$1,195.3	91.6%	1.22	584
2018-08-14	CA,QC	Advance	2021	2021	$14.90	9,401,500	$140.1	75.3%	1.45	1281
2018-11-14	CA,QC	Current	2016	2018	$15.31	78,825,717	$1,206.8	95.1%	1.17	721
2018-11-14	CA,QC	Advance	2021	2021	$15.33	9,401,500	$144.1	79.8%	1.42	1799
2019-02-20	CA,QC	Current	2016	2019	$15.73	80,847,404	$1,271.7	93.0%	1.21	563
2019-02-20	CA,QC	Advance	2022	2022	$15.62	9,401,500	$146.9	81.6%	0.66	2312
2019-05-14	CA,QC	Current	2016	2019	$17.45	66,321,122	$1,157.3	86.1%	1.46	701
2019-05-14	CA,QC	Advance	2022	2022	$17.40	9,038,000	$157.3	84.9%	1.48	1528
2019-08-20	CA,QC	Current	2016	2019	$17.16	66,289,515	$1,137.5	87.2%	1.49	623
2019-08-20	CA,QC	Advance	2022	2022	$16.85	9,038,000	$152.3	71.1%	1.07	1369
2019-11-19	CA,QC	Current	2013	2019	$17.00	67,435,661	$1,146.4	92.6%	1.28	815
2019-11-19	CA,QC	Advance	2022	2022	$16.80	9,038,000	$151.8	79.5%	1.10	1551
2020-02-19	CA,QC	Current	2017	2020	$17.87	57,090,077	$1,020.2	87.3%	1.52	624
2020-02-19	CA,QC	Advance	2023	2023	$18.00	8,672,250	$156.1	71.0%	1.96	1615
2020-05-20	CA,QC	Current	2017	2020	$16.68	21,161,000	$353.0	98.8%	0.37	2850
2020-05-20	CA,QC	Advance	2023	2023	$16.68	1,763,000	$29.4	91.0%	0.20	4197
2020-08-18	CA,QC	Current	2020	2020	$16.68	52,627,000	$877.8	96.5%	0.89	896
2020-08-18	CA,QC	Advance	2023	2023	$16.73	8,672,250	$145.1	80.1%	1.29	1548
2020-11-17	CA,QC	Current	2015	2020	$16.93	56,366,432	$954.3	84.1%	1.20	812
2020-11-17	CA,QC	Advance	2023	2023	$17.35	8,672,250	$150.5	90.9%	1.37	1883
2021-02-17	CA,QC	Current	2021	2021	$17.80	54,773,607	$975.0	89.4%	1.24	679
2021-02-17	CA,QC	Advance	2024	2024	$18.01	8,306,250	$149.6	79.5%	1.12	1668
2021-05-19	CA,QC	Current	2021	2021	$18.80	71,647,138	$1,347.0	79.9%	1.48	503
2021-05-19	CA,QC	Advance	2024	2024	$19.04	8,306,250	$158.2	90.6%	1.23	1915
2021-08-18	CA,QC	Current	2020	2021	$23.30	71,261,536	$1,660.4	67.5%	1.85	472
2021-08-18	CA,QC	Advance	2024	2024	$23.69	8,306,250	$196.8	88.0%	1.45	1825
2021-11-17	CA,QC	Current	2019	2021	$28.26	68,598,217	$1,938.6	81.3%	1.51	482
2021-11-17	CA,QC	Advance	2024	2024	$34.01	8,306,250	$282.5	88.1%	1.20	1690
2022-02-16	CA,QC	Current	2017	2022	$29.15	58,527,697	$1,706.1	86.5%	1.82	582
2022-02-16	CA,QC	Advance	2025	2025	$19.70	7,079,000	$139.5	81.6%	0.89	1716
2022-05-18	CA,QC	Current	2016	2022	$30.85	58,331,300	$1,799.5	87.7%	1.62	615
2022-05-18	CA,QC	Advance	2025	2025	$28.13	7,942,750	$223.4	85.7%	2.40	1622
2022-08-17	CA,QC	Current	2016	2022	$27.00	56,956,085	$1,537.8	87.6%	1.29	654
2022-08-17	CA,QC	Advance	2025	2025	$30.00	7,942,750	$238.3	82.3%	2.51	1072
2022-11-16	CA,QC	Current	2021	2022	$26.80	58,020,854	$1,555.0	80.44%	1.80	451
2022-11-16	CA,QC	Advance	2025	2025	$26.00	7,942,750	$206.5	83.31%	2.35	1182
2023-02-15	CA,QC	Current	2023	2023	$27.85	56,395,720	$1,570.6	87.06%	1.84	463
2023-02-15	CA,QC	Advance	2026	2026	$27.01	7,577,000	$204.7	78.84%	2.43	1057
2023-05-17	CA,QC	Current	2023	2023	$30.33	56,084,237	$1,701.0	86.36%	1.75	520
2023-05-17	CA,QC	Advance	2026	2026	$30.05	7,577,000	$227.7	77.13%	2.63	1093
2023-08-16	CA,QC	Current	2023	2023	$35.20	55,760,384	$1,962.8	83.45%	1.59	483
2023-08-16	CA,QC	Advance	2026	2026	$34.16	7,577,000	$258.8	80.18%	2.02	1071
2023-11-15	CA,QC	Current	2013	2023	$38.73	57,617,565	$2,231.5	80.39%	1.65	579
2023-11-15	CA,QC	Advance	2026	2026	$37.40	7,577,000	$283.4	76.41%	2.27	749
2024-02-14	CA,QC	Current	2024	2024	$41.76	51,216,056	$2,138.8	86.50%	1.72	638
2024-02-14	CA,QC	Advance	2027	2027	$41.00	7,211,000	$295.7	74.76%	2.58	914
2024-05-22	CA,QC	Current	2017	2024	$37.02	51,589,488	$1,909.8	86.25%	1.55	496
2024-05-22	CA,QC	Advance	2027	2027	$38.35	7,211,000	$276.5	76.13%	2.15	906
2024-08-14	CA,QC	Current	2019	2024	$30.24	51,179,715	$1,547.7	85.61%	1.57	525
2024-08-14	CA,QC	Advance	2027	2027	$29.75	7,211,000	$214.5	76.58%	1.87	1110
2024-11-20	CA,QC	Current	2019	2024	$31.91	52,629,612	$1,679.4	82.03%	1.50	535
2024-11-20	CA,QC	Advance	2027	2027	$30.16	7,211,000	$217.5	72.36%	1.60	1148
2025-02-19	CA,QC	Current	2025	2025	$29.27	51,466,028	$1,506.4	83.31%	1.74	565
2025-02-19	CA,QC	Advance	2028	2028	$28.00	6,847,750	$191.7	59.49%	1.84	704
2025-05-21	CA,QC	Current	2023	2025	$25.87	43,865,000	$1,134.8	81.49%	0.86	494
2025-05-21	CA,QC	Advance	2028	2028	$26.15	6,847,750	$179.1	70.18%	1.25	1101
2025-08-20	CA,QC	Current	2025	2025	$28.76	51,883,970	$1,492.2	84.76%	1.45	588
2025-08-20	CA,QC	Advance	2028	2028	$28.50	6,847,750	$195.2	79.83%	1.67	1272
2025-11-19	CA,QC	Current	2023	2025	$28.32	51,253,305	$1,451.5	81.64%	1.10	515
2025-11-19	CA,QC	Advance	2028	2028	$29.61	6,847,750	$202.8	62.77%	1.65	953
2026-02-18	CA,QC	Current	2024	2026	$27.94	54,975,757	$1,536.0	87.79%	1.04	547
2026-02-18	CA,QC	Advance	2028	2028	$27.94	6,481,750	$181.1	69.85%	0.97	1195
2026-05-20	CA,QC	Current	2024	2026	$28.81	49,647,415		81.29%	1.11	488
2026-05-20	CA,QC	Advance	2029	2029	$28.76	6,481,750		68.36%	1.37	1151
2026-08-19	CA,QC	Current	2017	2026	$32.48	49,016,180		77.84%	1.31	469
2026-08-19	CA,QC	Advance	2029	2029	$32.75	6,481,750		78.76%	1.86	1043

== See also ==
- Cap-and-Invest (Washington state)
- California Air Resources Board
