= Monohon =

Monohon may refer to:

- Carol Monohon, American politician from Washington
- Monohon, Washington

== See also ==
- Monahan
