= Sid Snyder =

American politician

Majority Leader of the Washington Senate
- In office January 11, 1999 – January 13, 2003
- Preceded by: Dan McDonald
- Succeeded by: James E. West

Minority Leader of the Washington Senate
- In office January 9, 1995 – January 11, 1999
- Preceded by: George L. Sellar
- Succeeded by: Dan McDonald

Member of the Washington Senate from the 19th district
- In office October 2, 1990 – November 8, 2002
- Preceded by: Arlie U. DeJarnatt
- Succeeded by: Mark Doumit

Secretary of the Washington Senate
- In office May 12, 1969 – January 10, 1988
- Preceded by: Donald R. Wilson
- Succeeded by: Gordon A. Golob

Personal details
- Born: July 30, 1926 Kelso, Washington, U.S.
- Died: October 14, 2012 (aged 86) Long Beach, Washington, U.S.
- Party: Democratic
- Education: Lower Columbia College (attended)
- Profession: Businessman

Sidney R. Snyder (July 30, 1926 – October 14, 2012) was an American businessman and politician.

Born in Kelso, Washington, he graduated from Kelso High School and went to Lower Columbia College. Snyder served in the United States Army Air Forces during World War II. In 1946, he owned and operated Sid's Market a grocery store in Seaview, Washington. He also founded a bank. In 1949, Snyder worked for the Washington State Legislature as an elevator operator and then as a clerk. In 1990 Snyder was elected to the Washington State Senate as a Democrat. He died in Long Beach, Washington.

Washington State Senate
Preceded by Dan McDonald	Majority Leader of the Washington Senate; 1999–2003	Succeeded by James E. West
