= Cosmo Specialty Fibers =

Defunct pulp mill in Cosmopolis, Washington

- Coordinates: 46°57′09″N 123°45′54″W
- Owners: Weyerhaeuser (former); The Gores Group (former); Richard Bassett

Cosmo Specialty Fibers is a defunct pulp mill in Cosmopolis, Washington, United States. In the past, it used sulfite processing to extract cellulose from wood pulp.

== History and ownership ==
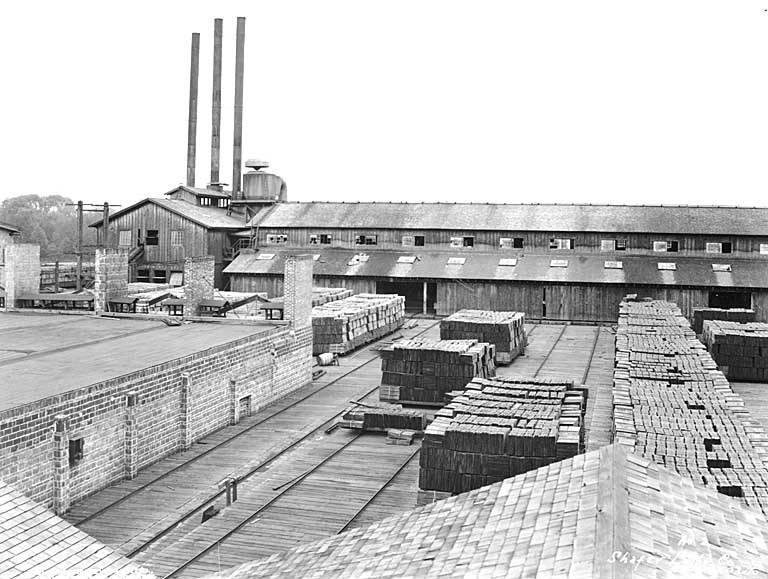
Grays Harbor was a hub of Washington's logging industry. This shingle manufacturing plant in nearby Aberdeen, Washington, is representative of boom times in the early 20th century (c. 1929)

Originally, it opened as a saw mill in 1888, owned by the Grays Harbor Mill Company.

During the 1920s, Grays Harbor was by some metrics the biggest lumber port in the world, shipping out over one billion board feet of lumber by water in 1924.

It was bought by lumber giant Weyerhaeuser in 1957 who transformed it into a pulp mill. It continued operating under Weyerhaeuser until 2005 when it announced plans to close following a 52 percent drop in earnings.

In 2010, it was purchased by a group consisting of a British investor, Richard Bassett, and a California investment firm, The Gores Group. Bassett had previously tried a similar tactic at a pulp mill named Neucel Specialty Cellulose in Port Alice, British Columbia on the north end of Vancouver Island. Neucel was bought by a Chinese rayon textile company Fulida over the course of 2010 to 2011. Neucel laid off hundreds of workers in 2015 and completely shuttered in 2019. In 2020, Neucel went bankrupt with a debt of CA$272 million. By 2023, the provincial government had spent at least CA$ 90 million on environmental cleanup at the site.

The Cosmopolis mill was restarted on May 21, 2011. It continued operation for a little less than a decade, before shutting down in 2020 during the COVID-19 pandemic. In 2022, it briefly reopened before closing again. Immediately afterward, Bassett assumed full ownership from the Gores Group, with plans to renovate the mill into a biorefinery with an on-site data center.

The mill was historically one of the biggest sources of income for local residents and revenue for local government. During full operation, it employed around 200 workers.

== Pollution and regulatory action ==
In the 1980s, Washington Department of Fish and Wildlife investigated the impact of the plant's pollution in the Chehalis River on decreased coho salmon spawning.

Confirmed contamination incidents
Date	Contaminants	Duration/amount
October 27, 1979	liquid chlorine	
December 1, 1979	magnesium oxide	Duration: 5 hours
February 6, 1980	red liquor	1,000 gallons
Feb 1995	sodium hydroxide	Groundwater pH exceeded 12.0
January 6, 1998	acid	pH as low as 1.0
September 12, 2023	wastewater	

A November 2017 sediment study found high levels of dioxins and furans near the mill.

In April 2024, the federal Environmental Protection Agency intervened to prevent a "potential catastrophic release" of harmful chemicals. EPA ordered Cosmo Specialty Fibers to provide 24-hour security, fire suppression systems, and maintain power and water service. On September 17, 2024, the EPA was notified that the facility had lost power.

In 2025, despite being closed down in 2022, the Washington state Department of Ecology fined it $2.3 million for leaking corrosive chemicals out of its storage tanks, polluting the Chehalis River, failing to report emissions, and failing to surrender emissions allowances. In both 2023 and 2024, it was the only entity in Washington state to not comply with its Cap and Invest greenhouse gas emissions obligations. Bassett has appealed the fine, arguing that the allowances were charged when the plant was not operating. According to Ecology's interpretation of the statute, emitters are charged based on historical emissions, which the mill had surpassed. However, emitters that fall below 5,000 tons of CO2e for three years in a row become exempt in future years.

Fines levied by Ecology
Category	Amount	Statute(s)	WAC regulations
Dangerous Waste	$499,350	Washington Hazardous Waste Management Act RCW § 70A.300	WAC 173-303
Water Quality	$677,325	RCW § 90.48	WAC 173-224
Air Quality	$142,602	Washington Clean Air Act RCW § 70A.15	WAC 173-401-930 WAC 173-401-620 (2)(f)
Cap-and-Invest	$687,992	Climate Commitment Act	WAC 173-446
Emissions Reporting	$280,700	Washington Clean Air Act RCW § 70A.15	WAC 173-441

Ecology has announced a plan under the Washington Model Toxic Controls Act (RCW § 70A.305) to have Cosmo Specialty Fibers and Weyerhaeuser, the "potentially liable parties", conduct a cleanup feasibility study.
