= Climate change policy of Washington (state) =

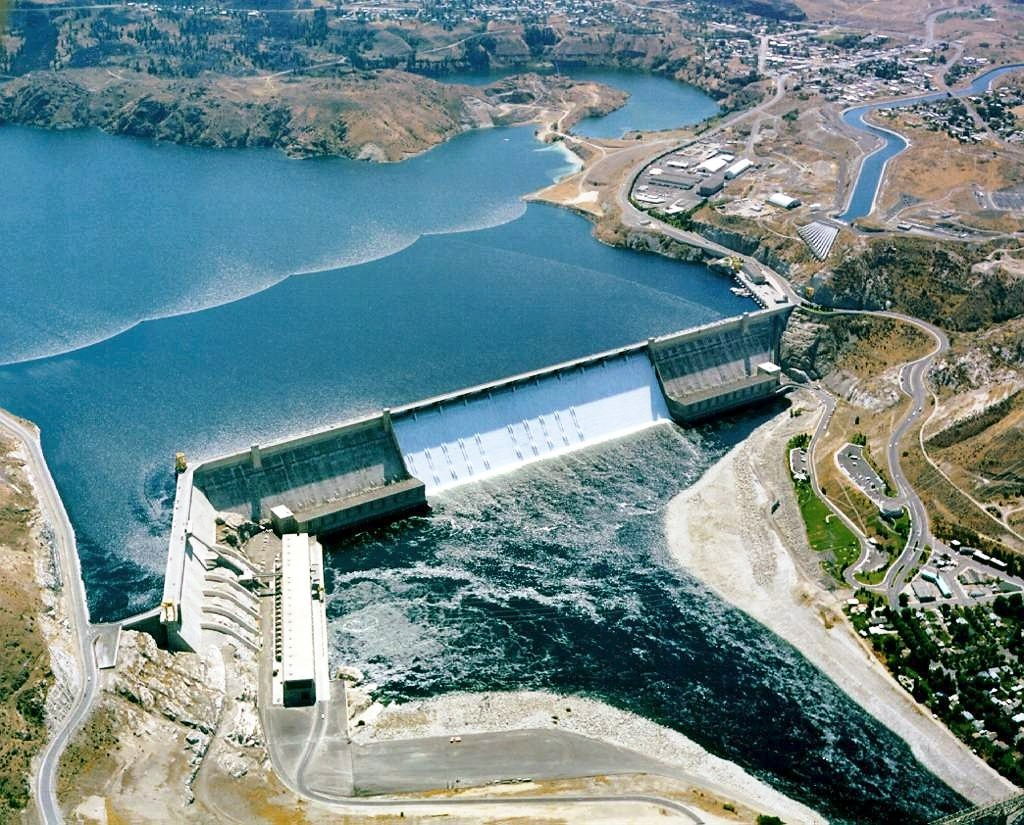
Grand Coulee Dam in Washington state is the largest power station in the United States

The climate change policy of Washington state involves a combination of incentives and penalties intended to reduce greenhouse gas emissions (GHG). State legislators and governors have consistently rejected climate change denial and stated their belief that addressing climate change is one of the most pressing issues at hand. In modern political history, Washington state is considered a stronghold for the Democratic party, which favors government action to reduce carbon emissions.

== History ==
Even before statehood, hydroelectricity provided a source of renewable energy in the Washington territory. In 1885, a dynamo was installed onto a flour mill on Spokane Falls, generating hydroelectric power for lighting and streetcar power. Grand Coulee Dam, which was built on the Columbia River watershed as part of the New Deal, is the single largest power station in the United States, renewable or otherwise. It is also the 10th largest hydroelectric power station in the world.

Hydroelectricity has been both the largest source of renewable energy in Washington state, making up 86% of its renewable generation in 2023, and the largest source of overall energy generation, accounting for 64% of electricity generated in Washington state. However, due to electricity exports, it only account for 45% of energy consumed in the state in 2021. As of 2023, Washington generates the most hydroelectricity of any state. The recorded peak of electricity generated was in 2011, when the state generated almost 92,000 GWh of conventional hydroelectric power. Worsening effects of climate change have caused droughts, leading to lower power generation from dams, such as in 2023 when the state generated only 61,000 GWh of conventional hydroelectricity.

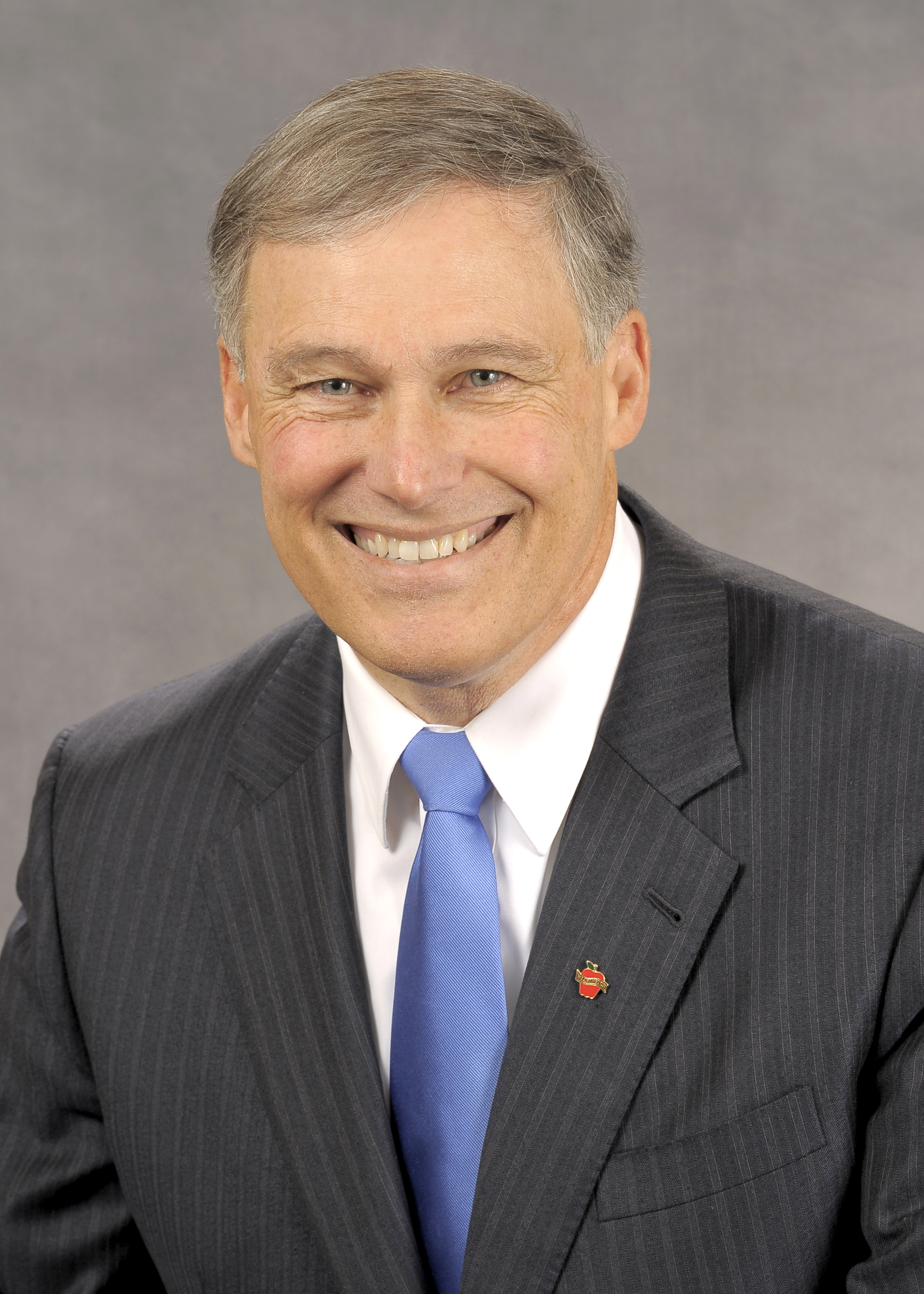
The policies of Governor Jay Inslee (2013-2025) emphasized climate change

In the 21st century, climate change policy has been a prominent topic in state level policy. Both Governors Christine Gregoire (2005-2013) and Jay Inslee (2013-2025) promoted their green policies, with the latter making it the centerpiece of his 2020 presidential campaign. Voters have also had opportunities to weigh in directly on climate change policy through the ballot initiative process (e.g. I-937, ST3).

On February 7, 2007, Governor Christine Gregoire signed an executive order setting greenhouse gas emissions reduction goals of reaching 1990 baseline levels by 2020, 25% below baseline in 2035, and 50% below baseline in 2050. These goals were soon enacted as legal limits by the legislature. In 2020, these limits were accelerated by the legislature.

In the late 2010s, two ballot initiatives aiming to curb carbon emissions through economic disincentives were rejected by voters. Initiative 732 in 2016 would have decreased the state sales tax (one of the main sources of revenue for the state government) and implemented a new tax on carbon emissions. The intent was to keep tax revenue neutral while encouraging businesses and consumers to shift away from sources of carbon emission (e.g. gasoline). I-732 failed with 59% voting against.

Similarly, Initiative 1631 in 2018 would have enacted fees for large emitters based on the fossil fuels sold or used in the state, as well as electricity consumed in the state. Revenue from the fees would have gone into (1) a fund for air quality and energy programs and projects, (2) a fund for water quality and forest health projects, and (3) a fund for investments related to communities. It was defeated with 57% voting against.

Most of the current funding to address climate change has been allocated through acts of the state legislature, whereas of 2025 the Democratic party has held a trifecta since 2018. The state legislature enacted a group of laws which were branded as "The Big Seven" climate policies, targeting the following areas:

Year in effect	Climate policy	Description
2020	Clean Energy Transformation Act	Bans coal by 2025; all electricity must be carbon neutral by 2030 and carbon zero by 2045; utilities must submit transition plans
2020	Hydrofluorocarbons (HFCs)	Limits certain super polluting HFCs commonly used as refrigerants
2023	Climate Commitment Act (CCA)	Creates the Cap-and-Invest program
2023	Clean Fuel Standard	Requires gasoline suppliers to reduce the carbon intensity of fuel over time
2024	Clean Building Codes	Updates building codes to improve energy efficiency and encourage non-fossil fuel energy in new construction
2025	Clean Vehicles	Effectively bans non-plug-in hybrid gasoline vehicles by 2035
2026	Building Performance Standards	Requires existing large and multifamily buildings to reduce fossil fuel consumption

== Clean energy mandates ==
In the November 2006 elections, I-937 passed with 52% of the vote, requiring that large utilities generate at least 15% of their power from solar or wind energy by 2020. The text of the ballot measure specifically excludes hydropower from the 15% requirement, likely due to it already being a well established source of renewable energy in Washington.

Governor Christine Gregoire signed SB 5769 in 2011, setting more stringent standards of emissions for all coal plants to go into effect in 2020 and 2025. At the time, the Centralia coal plant was the only one remaining in the state and the new regulations would effectively require it to close down all but one boiler by 2020 and fully decommission by 2025. As part of the agreement, operator TransAlta set up a $55 million Centralia Coal Transition Fund to help soften the economic blow to the community. The fund has been cited by some as a model for how to transition communities centered around coal plants. Unit one went offline on December 31, 2020, as planned.

The 2019 Washington Clean Energy Transformation Act bans the consumption of coal-generated electricity, including "coal-by-wire" from out of state, by the end of 2025, requires that all retail sales of electricity be carbon neutral by 2030, and requires that Washington's energy supply be free of greenhouse gases by 2045. All investor owned utilities are required to complete a clean energy implementation plan every four years, beginning in 2022. This plan must outline how each utility will gradually shift to renewables in order to meet the statutory requirements and the costs required to come into compliance. For example, the largest utility in Washington, Puget Sound Energy, planned to move from 43% clean energy in 2022 to 63% in 2025 to prepare for the 2030 carbon neutral requirement.

== Overall emissions mandates ==
In 2008, the legislature set limits for all statewide greenhouse gas emissions to 1990 levels by 2020, 25% below 1990 levels by 2035, and 50% below 1990 levels by 2050. More aggressive limits were set for state agencies, using 2005 levels as a baseline instead: 15% below baseline by 2020, 36% below baseline by 2035, and 57.5% below baseline by 2050.

In 2020, HB 2311 amended those limits to accelerate the rate of transition. The new limits are 1990 levels by 2020, 45% below 1990 levels by 2030, 70% below 1990 levels by 2040, and 95% below 1990 levels by 2050. Additionally, any remaining emissions by 2050 (up to 5% of 1990 levels or 5 million metric tons) must be offset, effectively making the state's energy carbon neutral. The state government limits starting with 2030 were changed to match the overall state limits, while still continuing the use of 2005 as a baseline, as opposed to 1990. These amendments also clarified that they are limits to anthropogenic greenhouse gas emissions, but also that biannual reports on emissions are required to also report on the emissions from wildfires, in collaboration with the Department of Natural Resources.

While an official greenhouse gas inventory for 2020 from the Department of Ecology has not been released yet, electricity sector data showed an anomalous drop to below 1990 levels. This was largely attributed to the onset of the global COVID-19 pandemic and the ensuing disruptions to trends in energy demands. Greenhouse gas emissions in 2018 and 2019 were 2% and 9% higher than the 1990 baseline, respectively. The Washington state government also met their goal of 15% below 2005 baseline emissions for both 2020 and 2021, both years staying more than 13% below the limit.

In 2021, HB 1050 further restricted emissions of hydrofluorocarbons (HFCs), mainly used as refrigerants in air conditioners and industrial operations. The law directs the Department of Ecology to set a maximum global warming potential (GWP) for HFCs used in ice rinks, establish a refrigerant management program to reduce emissions, and to work with the State Building Code Council to set rules on refrigerants used in air conditioning units. The refrigerant management program requires building operators with at least 50 lbs of refrigerant with a GWP of 150 or greater to inspect for leaks and report to the state.

== Cap and invest program ==
In 2021, the Climate Commitment Act (CCA) required the Department of Ecology to develop a cap and invest program by the start of 2023. This program is intended to enforce the GHG limits set by the legislature, by requiring all businesses emitting at least 25,000 metric tons of CO_{2} equivalent to obtain allowances equal in size to their total emissions. Businesses found not to be in compliance can be fined up to $50,000 per violation, per day. A set number of allowances are auctioned off and can be bought and sold on secondary markets, similar to securities.

== Zero-emission vehicles ==
In the 21st century, Washington state has had one of the highest rates of adoption of battery electric vehicles in the US. In 2022, there were over 90,000 electric vehicles registered in Washington, the fourth most of any state, despite it being the 13th most populous state. It similarly had the fourth highest percentage of registered vehicles be battery electric or plug-in hybrid, behind California, the District of Columbia, and Hawaii, respectively.

In 2020, the legislature enacted a policy which requires the state to follow California's rules for zero-emission vehicles. In 2022, the California Air Regulation Board set a rule that would linearly phase out the sale of new gasoline cars by 2035 by requiring automakers to deliver an increasing number of zero-emission vehicles, starting with 35% ZEV in 2026, to 68% in 2030, before effectively banning the sale of gasoline vehicles in 2035. However, plug-in hybrids which can travel at least 50 miles without gasoline will still qualify as ZEVs.

In 2024, the Department of Commerce announced a low-income instant rebate program for battery electric vehicles, funded by the Climate Commitment Act. Washington residents making up to 300% of the federal poverty level can qualify for $9,000 off a 3+ year lease of a new BEV, $5,000 off a 2+ year lease or purchase, or $2,500 off a purchase or lease of a used BEV.

Through the Electric Vehicle Charging Program, over $85 million in CCA grants to build almost 5,000 new charging stations in multifamily homes, workplaces, and public locations were awarded in 2024. These consisted of 4,710 AC level 2 EV chargers and 271 DC fast chargers.

In April 2025, the state will launch a program granting point of sale rebates of up to $1,200 for new electric bicycles. To qualify for the full amount, residents must make less than 80% of their county's median income, but if not they are still eligible for $300. The program, called "WE-Bike" was funded by the legislature with $5 million from the 2024 supplemental transportation budget. The program will be administered by APTIM, LLC. which oversaw similar e-bike rebate programs in other locations, such as Boston, Denver, Boulder, and Bentonville, Arkansas.

=== Retail sales tax exemption ===
In 2005, the state enacted an exemption for retail sales tax of new clean alternative fuel vehicles, for the full selling price or fair market value of the car.

Starting July 2015, this exemption was limited to vehicles with a fair market value of $35,000 or less. However, the exemption was also extended to plug-in hybrids with at least 30 miles of battery range. In 2016, HB 2778 raised the eligible MSRP of vehicles to $42,500 or less, but limited the tax exemption eligibility to $32,000 per vehicle. The exemption automatically was designed to expire after 7,500 vehicles eligible for the exemption have been titled in the state or by July 2019, whichever was earlier. Regarding HB 2778, Advisory Vote 15 was put on the ballot in November 2016 as a non-binding question as to whether the exemption should continue to be limited, in order to increase tax revenue for the state, or whether the tax exemption should extend to the full price of the vehicle. A majority advised against limiting the tax exemption. However, the legislature did not act on this non-binding advisory vote.

In 2019, the retail sales tax exemption for alternative fuel vehicles was reinstated, updating the eligible sale price to be $45,000 or less for new vehicles and $30,000 for used vehicles. For new vehicles, the amount eligible for tax exemption decreases over time, starting with $25,000 until mid-2021, to $20,000 until mid-2023, and to $15,000 until mid-2025. For used vehicles, the amount eligible for exemption is always $16,000. It passed with bipartisan support in both chambers.

== Public transit ==
Sound Transit is a regional public transit authority covering King, Pierce, and Snohomish counties, created in the 1990s with the goal of establishing a regional rapid transit system. It uses tax revenue to fund the development and operation of a variety of regional transit systems including Link light rail, bus rapid transit, and commuter rail. As of 2020, all Link light rail trains run on electricity generated by clean energy.

The Climate Commitment Act included funding to make public transit free, including buses, light rail, ferries, and Amtrak Cascades, for all youth under the age of 18.

=== Washington State Ferries ===
Washington State Ferries, which is the largest ferry system in the United States by ridership, is planning to gradually introduce battery electric ferries, eventually shifting to an entirely electric fleet by 2050. However, this initiative has been stalled by a slew of challenges including decreased post-pandemic ridership, poor state of repair for existing ferries, and "build in Washington" laws restricting the potential builders.

In 2023, the Legislature passed HB 1846 which creates an exception to the requirement to build ferries in Washington state for the contract to build five new hybrid diesel-electric ferries. They may be built anywhere in the United States, but WSF must award a 13% credit to the bids of builders in Washington. In 2024, WSF started the nationwide bidding process for hybrid diesel-electric ferries.

== Environmental justice ==
The 2021 environmental justice law, commonly known as the Healthy Environment for All Act (HEAL Act), implemented recommendations from an earlier environmental justice task force, to equitably invest in communities that have been disproportionately affected by pollution.
