= Senator Hatfield =

Senator Hatfield may refer to:

== Members of the United States Senate ==
- Henry D. Hatfield (1875–1962), U.S. Senator from West Virginia from 1929 to 1935
- Mark Hatfield (1922–2011), U.S. Senator from Oregon from 1967 to 1997
- Paul G. Hatfield (1928–2000), U.S. Senator from Montana in 1978

== United States state senate members ==
- Brian Hatfield (born 1966), Washington State Senate
- Ernest I. Hatfield (1890–1977), New York State Senate
- George J. Hatfield (1887–1953), California State Senate
