= Jim Walsh (Washington politician) =

American politician from Washington

Chair of the Washington Republican Party
- Incumbent
- Assumed office August 12, 2023
- Preceded by: Caleb Heimlich

Member of the Washington House of Representatives from the 19th district
- Incumbent
- Assumed office December 8, 2016 Serving with Joel McEntire
- Preceded by: JD Rossetti

Personal details
- Born: James W. Walsh; 1964 (age 61–62)
- Party: Republican
- Spouse: Jamie MacKinnon Walsh (died 2022)
- Children: 5
- Education: Amherst College (BA)

James W. Walsh (born 1964) is an American politician from the state of Washington and a member of the Republican Party. He has been a member of the state House of Representatives since 2017 and has served as chair of the Washington Republican Party since 2023.

== Early life and education ==
Walsh was born in 1964. He attended Amherst College, graduating cum laude in 1986. He formed a small publishing company in 1998 that he continues to operate today.

== Politics ==
Walsh was chair of the Grays Harbor County Republican Party before he was elected to the Washington House of Representatives in 2016. He was elected from Legislative District 19, which covers territory in Southwest Washington from Aberdeen to Longview. The district encompasses all of Pacific and Wahkiakum counties, and parts of Grays Harbor, Cowlitz, and Lewis counties, along with a small portion of Thurston.

In October 2018, two constituents filed a First Amendment lawsuit against Walsh for banning them from his Facebook page. The plaintiffs in the lawsuit were Jeff Nichols of Montesano, the president of the Twin Harbors Central Labor Council AFL-CIO, and Gilbert Myers of Aberdeen, who formerly worked on the campaign of Democratic candidate Teresa Purcell, who had narrowly lost the state House race to Walsh two years earlier.

Within the ideologically split state House Republican caucus, Walsh is part of the right-wing faction. He opposed the decision by House Republican leaders in 2019 to expel Matt Shea from the party caucus after an independent report determined that Shea had participated in Ammon Bundy's armed occupation of the Malheur National Wildlife Refuge. Walsh is part of the Facebook group for Bundy's organization and said that he sympathized with Bundy's cause but did not necessarily agree with all his views or methods.

At a 2018 rally at the Washington State Capitol, in which many attendees openly carried AR-15-style rifles and other firearms, Walsh appeared alongside Patriot Prayer leader Joey Gibson and denounced any restrictions on gun rights.

In 2021, to protest COVID-19 vaccine mandates, Walsh wore a yellow Star of David, the symbol that Nazis forced Jews to wear during the Holocaust), during a speech to a group of conservative activists, in which Walsh, "In the current context, we're all Jews." Walsh's Nazi analogy was criticized by Jewish groups and the Seattle-based Holocaust Center for Humanity, which said it trivialized the Holocaust and distorted history. He subsequently apologized.

In the 2023-2024 session, Walsh was ranking minority member of the House Civil Rights & Judiciary Committee and a member of the Human Services, Youth, & Early Learning Committee, Rules Committee, Transportation Committee, and Regulated Substances & Gaming Committee.

After Washington Republican Party chair Caleb Heimlich announced in June 2023 that he was stepping down, Walsh announced a run for the chairmanship. In August 2023, during the party's summer committee meeting, Walsh was elected chairman on a 95–15 vote. In a 2024 interview, Walsh said that he believed past Republican legislative leadership had treated its members accused of misconduct too harshly, citing the cases of Graham Hunt, Matt Manweller, Jesse Young, and Robert Sutherland. Walsh was a Donald Trump delegate to the 2024 Republican National Convention.

== Election results ==
Legislative District 19 (2016 general election)

- Jim Walsh (Republican) 28,693 votes (50.49%)
- Teresa Purcell (Democrat) 28,134 votes (49.51%)

Legislative District 19 (2018 general election)

- Jim Walsh (Republican) 28,569 votes (50.43%)
- Erin Frasier (Democrat) 28,085 votes (49.57%)

Legislative District 19 (2020 general election)

- Jim Walsh (Republican) 43,315 votes (59.32%)
- Marianna Everson (Democrat) 29,625 votes (40.57%)

Legislative District 19 (2022 general election)

- Jim Walsh (Republican) 39,940 (62.17%)
- Kelli Hughes-Ham (Democrat) 24,232 votes (37.72%)

Legislative District 19 (2024 general election)

- Jim Walsh (Republican) 48,544 votes (60.14%)
- Mike Coverdale (Democrat) 32,094 votes (39.76%)

== Personal life ==
Walsh lives in Aberdeen. He and his wife Jamie MacKinnon Walsh, an architect and former school board member, had five children. Jamie MacKinnon Walsh died in an auto crash with a logging truck in Grays Harbor County in October 2022.

Party political offices
Preceded by Caleb Heimlich	Chair of the Washington Republican Party; 2023–present	Incumbent
