= Brian Blake =

American logger, forester and politician from Washington

Member of the Washington House of Representatives from the 19th district
- In office December 17, 2002 – January 11, 2021
- Preceded by: Mark Doumit
- Succeeded by: Joel McEntire

Personal details
- Born: Brian Ernest Blake; August 26, 1960 (age 66) Pullman, Washington, U.S.
- Party: Democratic
- Spouse: Debra Thomas
- Education: Grays Harbor College (AA); Evergreen State College (BS)
- Occupation: Logger, Forester, Politician

Brian Ernest Blake (born August 26, 1960) is an American logger, forester, and politician who served as a member of the Washington House of Representatives, representing the 19th district from 2002 to 2021. He is a member of the Democratic Party.

== Career ==
Blake served as chair of the House Agriculture and Natural Resources Committee from 2009 to 2021. He was twice named the Washington Farm Bureau's legislator of the year.

In 2019, Blake authored legislation to prohibit the sale of eggs from hens raised in battery cage facilities that fail to meet minimum animal welfare requirements. The law was supported by animal welfare groups like the Humane Society of the United States as well as Washington egg producers.
