= Jeff Wilson (Washington politician) =

Washington state politician

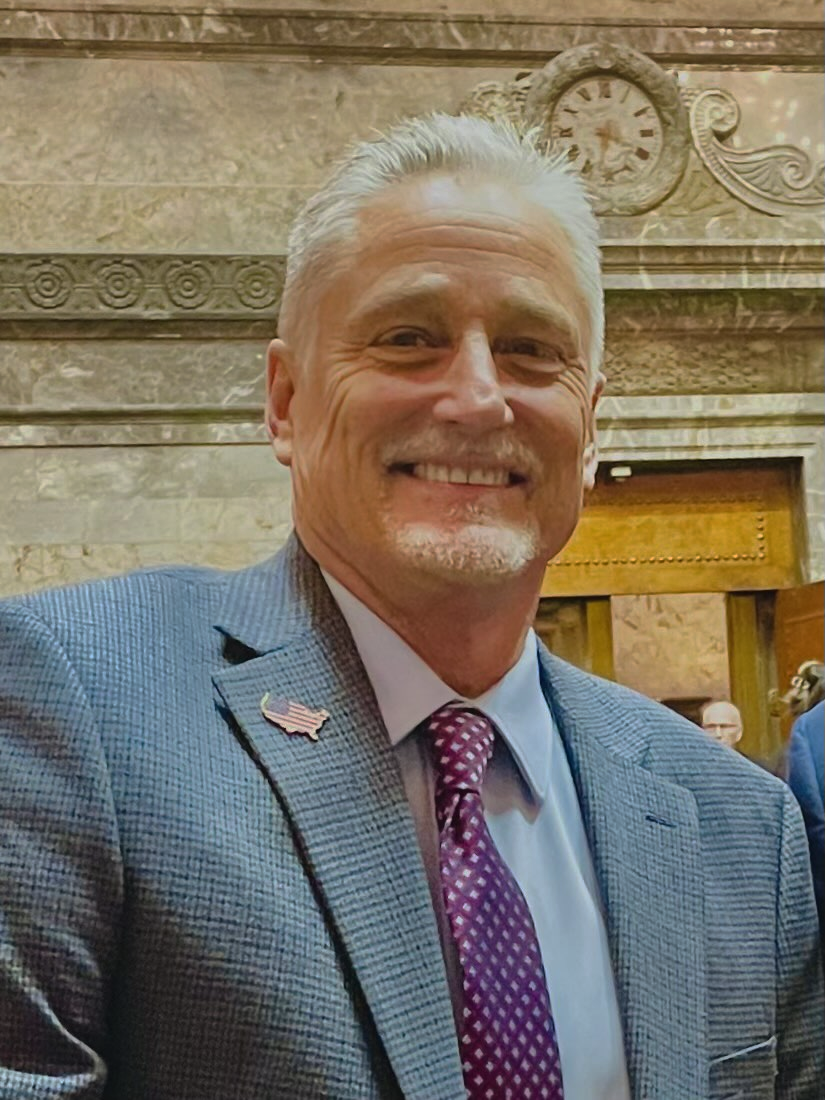
- Wilson in 2024

Member of the Washington State Senate from the 19th district
- Incumbent
- Assumed office January 11, 2021
- Preceded by: Dean Takko

Member of the Longview Port Commission District 1
- Incumbent
- Assumed office January 1, 2016
- Preceded by: Darold D. Dietz

Personal details
- Born: Stephen Jeffrey Wilson; 1959 or 1960 (age 65–66)
- Party: Republican
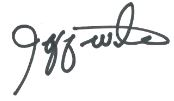
- Signature
- Website: Official

Stephen Jeffrey Wilson (born 1959 or 1960) is an American businessman and politician of the Republican Party. In 2020, he was elected to the Washington State Senate to represent the 19th legislative district and took office on January 11, 2021. Wilson is also a Port of Longview commissioner.

== Firearm incident ==
Wilson was arrested and charged with possession of a firearm in Hong Kong on October 21, 2023, Wilson discovered the firearm and turned the revolver over to airport officials. The gun was legally licensed in Washington State, but not in Hong Kong. According to Wilson, he discovered the unloaded firearm in his carry-on luggage mid-flight. He alerted Customs officers and was subsequently arrested for possession of arms without licence, which carries a maximum sentence of 14 years in jail and a fine of $100,000 HKD.

After his initial court hearing, Wilson and his family had verbal exchanges with reporters at the courthouse, leading to police mediation. Wilson was said to have verbally abused the reporters and asked them to delete any photos taken outside of the courthouse. He was ordered to surrender his travel documents and not to leave Hong Kong until his next court date. On October 30, 2023, Principal Magistrate Don So ordered the firearm confiscated and bound over Wilson to keep the peace for 2 years. As all legal proceedings have ended, Wilson was free to leave Hong Kong to continue his vacation.
