= Dean Takko =

American politician

Member of the Washington Senate from the 19th district
- In office October 22, 2015 – January 11, 2021
- Preceded by: Brian Hatfield
- Succeeded by: Jeff Wilson

Member of the Washington House of Representatives from the 19th district
- In office December 21, 2004 – October 22, 2015
- Preceded by: Brian Hatfield
- Succeeded by: JD Rossetti

Personal details
- Born: Dean Allen Takko; July 9, 1950 (age 76) Ilwaco, Washington
- Party: Democratic
- Spouse: Debra Takko
- Children: 1
- Education: Lower Columbia College (AA); Western Washington University (BS)
- Website: Official

Dean Allen Takko (born July 9, 1950) is an American politician who served as a member of the Washington State Senate, representing the 19th district from 2015 to 2021. A member of the Democratic Party, he previously served as a member of the Washington House of Representatives from 2004 to 2015.

== Career ==
Takko served on the Cathlament City Council from 1974-1975 after graduating from Western Washington University. He was the county assessor for Wahkiakum County from 1975-1978 and for Cowlitz County from 1999-2004.
