= Joel McEntire =

American politician from Washington

Member of the Washington House of Representatives from the 19th district
- Incumbent
- Assumed office March 8, 2024 Serving with Jim Walsh
- Preceded by: Lilian Hale
- In office January 11, 2021 – March 7, 2024
- Preceded by: Brian Blake
- Succeeded by: Lilian Hale

Personal details
- Born: Joel William McEntire; 1987 (age 38–39) Layton, Utah, U.S.
- Party: Republican
- Education: Central Washington University (BS); Western Governors University (MA)

Joel William McEntire (born 1987) is an American politician of the Republican Party. In 2020, he was elected to the Washington House of Representatives to represent the 19th legislative district and took office on January 11, 2021.

In 2023 a Twitter account in his name replied to other users and used the terms "straight up loser", "dim wit dem", and "utterly pathetic" among others. In response, McEntire stated that control of the account was "handed off to a kid from Vancouver to use" after an earlier statement that claimed the posts were "photoshopped".

On the final day of the 2024 legislative session, McEntire, who is a U.S. Marine Corps reservist, was on duty during mandatory service and unable to attend. In his place, Lilian Hale, his stepdaughter, temporarily succeeded him. Hale, attending the session on her 18th birthday, became the youngest, legally eligible legislator in Washington House of Representatives history.

On Monday, September 14th, 2026, Washington state Rep. Joel McEntire, R-Cathlamet, was placed under a year-long protection order after a Cowlitz County District Court judge ruled that certain Facebook comments he made to a constituent were not protected by the First Amendment; the order requires him to remove the posts in question and refrain from further posts.
