= Bill Hambrecht =

American investment banker

William R. Hambrecht
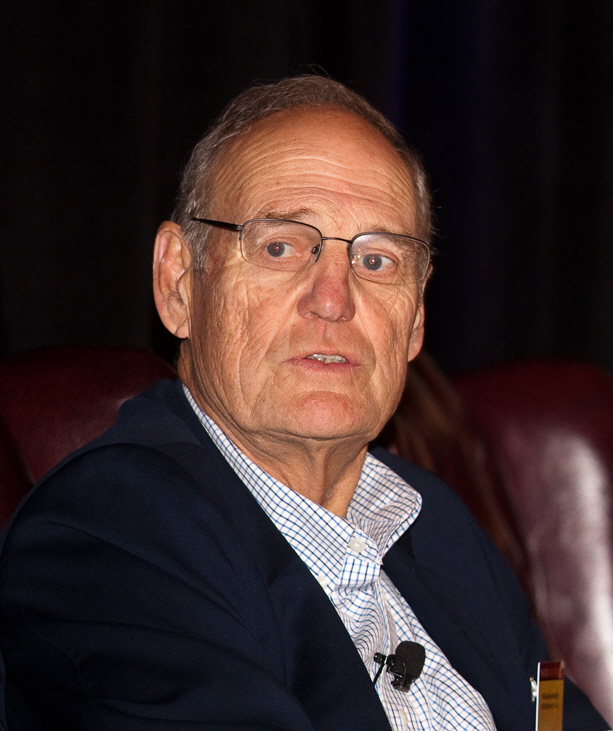
- Born: 1935 (age 90–91)
- Education: Princeton University, AB, History
- Occupation: Investment banker
- Spouse: Sally R. Hambrecht
- Children: 5

William R. Hambrecht (born 1935) is an American investment banker and chairman of WR Hambrecht + Co which he founded in 1998. He helped persuade Google to use an Internet-based auction for their initial public offering (IPO) in 2004, instead of a more traditional method using banks and other financial companies to find buyers. He is credited with popularizing this "OpenIPO" model, using Dutch auctions to allow anyone, not just investing insiders, to buy stock in an IPO, potentially raising more money for startups. Some of the companies he has helped have an IPO like this include Overstock.com, Ravenswood Winery, Andover.net, and Salon.com.

Hambrecht is also credited as one of the first major investment bankers to recognize the value of technology and biotech companies, helping to take Apple Computer, Genentech, and Adobe Systems public in the 1980s with his earlier San Francisco-based company Hambrecht & Quist, which he founded in 1968 and which also backed the IPOs of Netscape, MP3.com, and Amazon.com. The firm was bought by Chase Manhattan in 1999. In 1997, he sponsored the foundation of BOOM Securities (H.K.) Limited.

Hambrecht is a 1957 graduate of Princeton University, where he received an A.B. in History. He has been listed as one of the top political donors in the country, giving mostly to Democratic candidates, and credits Nancy Pelosi, whom he met in the 1970s, with inspiring him to get involved in politics.

Hambrecht is on the board of trustees of the American University of Beirut, Lebanon. He was on the Motorola board of directors from 2008 to 2011 and the AOL Inc. board of directors from December 2010 to February 2011.

== Professional football ==
In the 1980s Hambrecht was a minority investor in the Oakland Invaders, a charter member of the failed United States Football League.

In 2007 Hambrecht was again in the news for planning a professional football league, the United Football League. Along with AOL CEO Tim Armstrong, Hambrecht pledged $2 million to start the league up and arranged its original owners. On August 11, 2009, Hambrecht stepped forward to be the owner of the Las Vegas Locomotives franchise. The league remains under his overall leadership and direction. The William Hambrecht Trophy, awarded to the winner of the UFL championship game, is named in his honor. Hambrecht was sued in the spring of 2013 for payment due 138 players and former coaches who did not receive their 2012 salaries. He lost the case in Las Vegas courts.
