= Climate Commitment Act =

Washington state climate law

The Climate Commitment Act is a law enacted by the Washington state legislature and signed by Governor Jay Inslee in 2021.

== Cap and invest program ==
The Climate Commitment Act is implemented through the Cap-and-Invest program which was launched in 2023.

== Initiative 2117 ==
In the 2024 general election, ballot initiative 2117 which sought to repeal the Climate Commitment Act was placed on the ballot. A poll in May 2024 of 403 registered voters showed 41% support repealing while 31% oppose with a +/- 5% margin of error. Over $8.5 million and $5 million were raised in support and opposition of the initiative, respectively.

Initiative 2117 is part of a group of ballot initiatives led by conservative leaders, including businessman Brian Heywood, who criticized the CCA for targeting gasoline which has inelastic demand, meaning that people still have to buy it even when the price goes up. He was quoted as describing the policy as "like Marie Antoinette — let them drive Teslas." The coalition defending the CCA, No on 2117 includes Microsoft, Amazon, and oil company BP.

At the 2024 meeting of the North American Carbon World, Director of the Washington State Department of Ecology, Laura Watson, suggested that the result of the reason for the sudden drop in settlement price for carbon allowances in the first auction of the year was a result of the initiative getting on the ballot.

Initiative 2117 failed with 61.95% of the 3.8 million total votes being cast against it, leaving the CCA intact.

== See also ==
- Climate change policy of Washington (state)
