= Brian Hatfield =

American politician from Washington

Member of the Washington Senate from the 19th district
- In office November 17, 2006 – August 31, 2015
- Preceded by: Mark Doumit
- Succeeded by: Dean Takko

Member of the Washington House of Representatives from the 19th district
- In office September 23, 1994 – November 23, 2004
- Preceded by: Mike Riley
- Succeeded by: Dean Takko

Personal details
- Born: Brian Allen Hatfield; July 8, 1966 (age 60) Aberdeen, Washington, U.S.
- Education: Grays Harbor College (AA); Washington State University (BA)

Brian Allen Hatfield (born July 8, 1966) served in the Washington State Senate and the Washington State House of Representatives, representing the 19th Legislative District, a district that includes Cowlitz, Grays Harbor, Pacific, Lewis and Wahkiakum Counties.

After being elected six times, never receiving less than 63.19% of the vote, and serving ten years in the Washington State House of Representatives(1994–2004), Hatfield resigned in 2004 to work full-time for Lieutenant Governor Brad Owen.

He was appointed in 2006 to the Senate to replace Mark Doumit. He received 73.89% of the vote in the 2007 special election and was re-elected, without opposition, to a four-year term in 2008. He was re-elected again, in 2012, receiving 62.16% of the vote. In the Senate, Hatfield chaired the Agriculture, Water & Rural Economic Development Committee and served on the Economic Development, Trade & Innovation Committee and the Ways & Means Committee. On September 1, 2015, Hatfield resigned to serve as Washington Governor Jay Inslee’s sector lead for forest products. In December of 2021, Hatfield was picked by Washington Secretary of State Steve Hobbs to serve as his Legislative Director.
