= Mark Doumit =

American politician (1961–2021)

Member of the Washington Senate from the 19th district
- In office November 26, 2002 – November 1, 2006
- Preceded by: Sid Snyder
- Succeeded by: Brian Hatfield

Member of the Washington House of Representatives from the 19th district
- In office January 13, 1997 – November 26, 2002
- Preceded by: Bob Basich
- Succeeded by: Brian Blake

Personal details
- Born: Mark Lawton Doumit; November 26, 1961 Longview, Washington, U.S.
- Died: June 21, 2021 (aged 59) Tenino, Washington, U.S.
- Party: Democratic
- Education: Lower Columbia College (AA); Washington State University (BA)
- Profession: Commercial fisherman

Mark Lawton Doumit (November 26, 1961 – June 21, 2021) was an American commercial fisherman and politician who represented the 19th District in the Washington State Senate and the State House from 1997-2006.

== Political career ==
Doumit was elected as a Wahkiakum County Commissioner in 1988. He served two terms as a Commissioner before running for the Washington House of Representatives in 1996.

In the House, Doumit chaired the House Natural Resources Committee.

Doumit was appointed to the Senate in 2002 to fill the term of Sid Snyder. He vacated his seat to take a job in the private sector in late 2006.
