= Washington Conservation Corps =

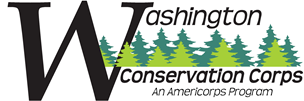
- Washington Conservation Corps Logo

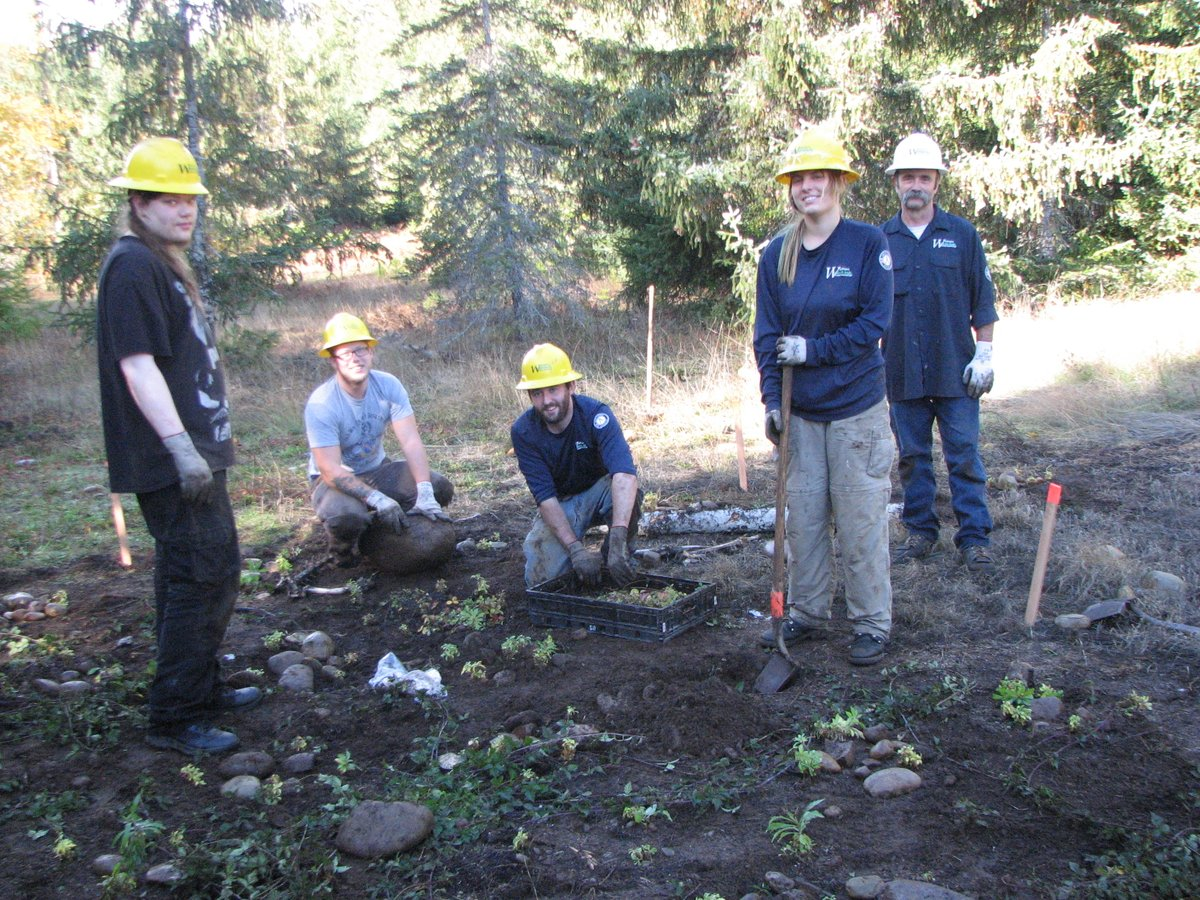
- WCC members planting a pollinator friendly garden at Olympic National Forest in 2017
- Abbreviation: WCC
- Formation: 1983; 43 years ago
- Purpose: Environmental services
- Region served: Washington State
- Members: 285 (2024)
- Parent organization: Washington Department of Ecology
- Affiliations: Washington Climate Corps Network; AmeriCorps

The Washington Conservation Corps (WCC) is a sub-agency of the Washington State Department of Ecology. WCC members work on projects in their communities, from habitat restoration, to trail construction, to natural disaster response. WCC members are active across the state of Washington and are a part of the state and nationwide disaster response network.

== Positions ==
Corps members (18-25 years olds and military veterans) serve between a 3-month and a 11-month term. Members are allowed a second term, often returning to serve as Assistant Supervisors or Individual Placements (referred to as IP).

Most WCC members perform their service in a crew, a collection of members assigned to serve in a particular locality. Examples of work a crew member might engage in span riparian zone restoration work, wetland restoration work, invasive species clearing, and other environmental enhancement projects. Projects typically last several days—something members refer to as a "spike." Within a single term, crews will handle several spikes. Each crew is led by a supervisor, a Washington State Department of Ecology employee.

Alternatively, a corps member may elect to serve as an individual placement (IP). IPs serve as interns with one agency for their entire term. IPs generally serve as environmental educators, outreach coordinators, or biological or lab technicians.

== Benefits ==
WCC members receive:

- a living stipend (similar to the minimum wage)
- health insurance
- opportunities for certifications (e.g. Red Card, Wilderness First Responder, Hazwoper) through paid training
- qualified student loan forbearance (AmeriCorps benefit)
- education award (AmeriCorps benefit, which, as of 2023, is worth $6,895) upon compleition of their service
