= Carol Monohon =

American politician

Member of the Washington House of Representatives from the 19th district
- In office 1976-1977 – 1978-1984

Member of the Washington Senate
- In office 1977–1978

Personal details
- Born: Raymond, Washington
- Party: Democratic

Carol Monohon was an American politician who served in the Washington State House for the 19th district. She also served in the senate.
