= Dutch auction =

Type of auction which begins with a high asking price, and lowers it

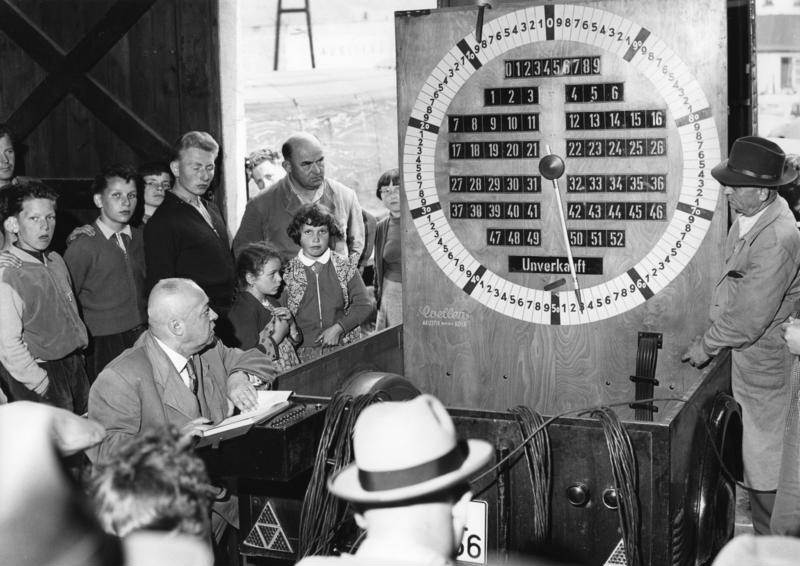
A 1957 Dutch auction in Germany to sell fruit

A Dutch auction is one of several similar types of auctions for buying or selling goods. Most commonly, it means an auction in which the auctioneer begins with a high offer price in the case of selling, and lowers it until some participant accepts the price, or it reaches a set reserve price. This type of price auction is most commonly used for goods that are required to be sold quickly such as flowers, fresh produce, or tobacco. A Dutch auction has also been called a clock auction or open-outcry descending-price auction. This type of auction shows the advantage of speed since a sale never requires more than one bid. It is strategically similar to a first-price sealed-bid auction.

== History ==
Herodotus relates an account of a descending price auction in Babylon, suggesting that market mechanisms similar to Dutch auctions were used in ancient times. Descending-price auctions were used in 17th-century Holland for estate sales and paintings. The Dutch manner of auctioning appeared in England by the 17th century, which was called "mineing". In that type of auction, said to be a "Method of Sale not hitherto used in England", the auctioneer began with a high price that was sequentially reduced until one bidder cried out "Mine!" The Times mentioned a Dutch auction in 1788.

== Auction process ==
Before the auction commences, the auctioneer presents information about the objects sold to bidders. This information is displayed on a clock or electronic device in front of the site.

A Dutch auction initially offers an item at a price in excess of the amount the seller expects to receive. The price lowers in steps until a bidder accepts the current price. That bidder wins the auction and pays that price for the item. For example, a business might auction a used company car at a starting bid of €15,000. If nobody accepts the initial bid, the seller successively reduces the price in €1,000 increments. When the price reaches €10,000, a particular bidder—who feels that price is acceptable and that someone else might soon bid—quickly accepts the offer, and pays €10,000 for the car.

Dutch auctions are a competitive alternative to a traditional auction, in which customers make bids of increasing value until nobody is willing to bid higher.

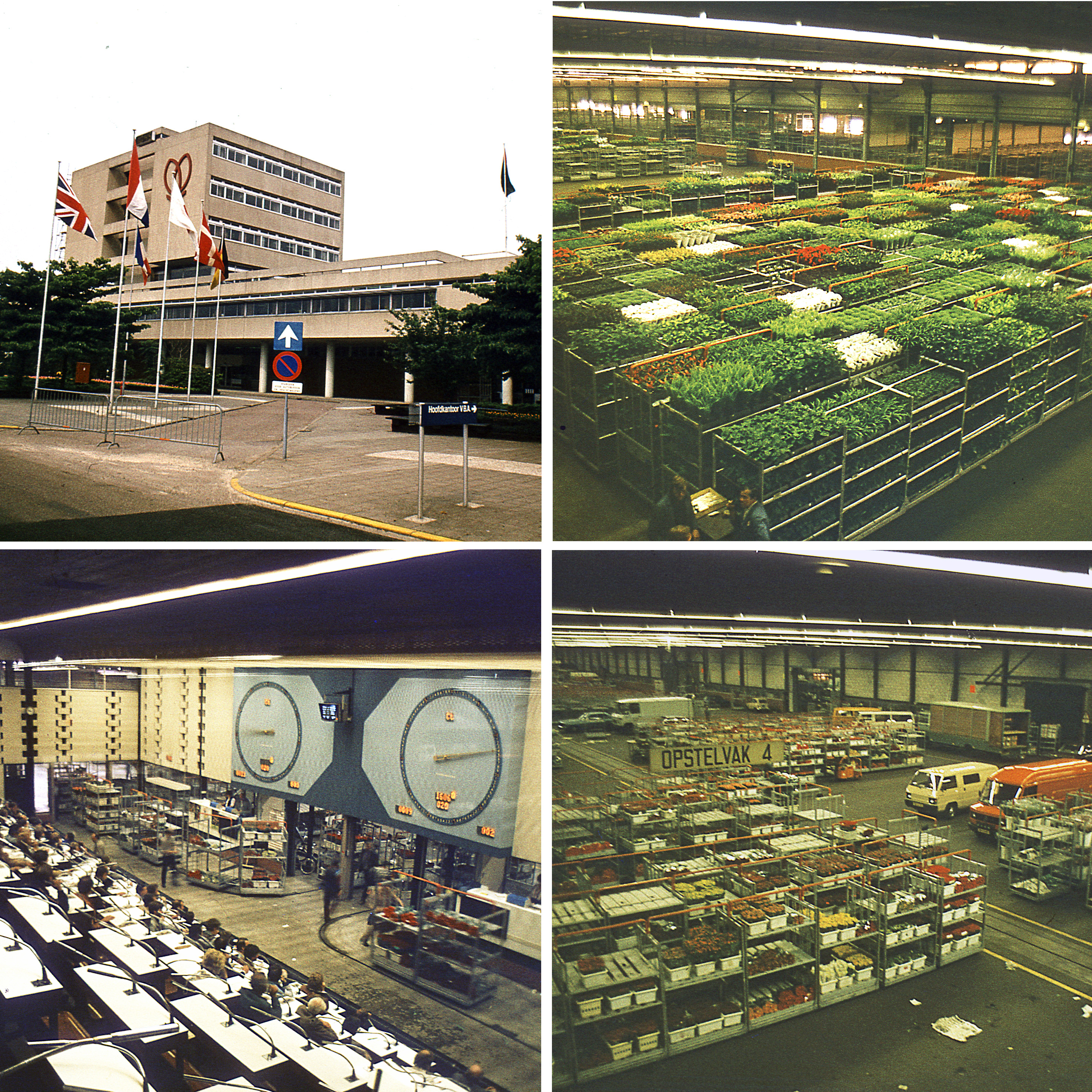
Aalsmeer Flower Auction

== Effect on stakeholders ==
=== Auctioneer's revenue ===
The speed of the clock used in the Dutch auction has a significant effect on final prices and the auctioneer's revenue. A fast Dutch clock has been found to yield significantly lower bids and seller revenue when benchmarked against a first-price sealed-bid auction. On the contrary, a sufficiently slow Dutch clock is found to be more profitable than a first-price auction.

Individual differences among bidders may also influence the degree to which a Dutch auction is profitable to the auctioneer. More advanced age has a clear, statistically significant adverse impact on the overall performance in Dutch auctions. Older bidders often end up paying too much in Dutch auctions because of their cognitive limitations and high need for closure.

In the case in which two or more bidders are participating in a Dutch auction, bid reductions should be increasing. Furthermore, the auctioneer's expected revenue should increase when the number of participants in the auction rises and number of bid levels increases.

The auctioneer is expected to increase its revenue when bidders exhibit the Allais paradox. This expectation is because bidders already have bidding preferences but insufficient time to change their preference and as such, typically act in accordance with their first plan.

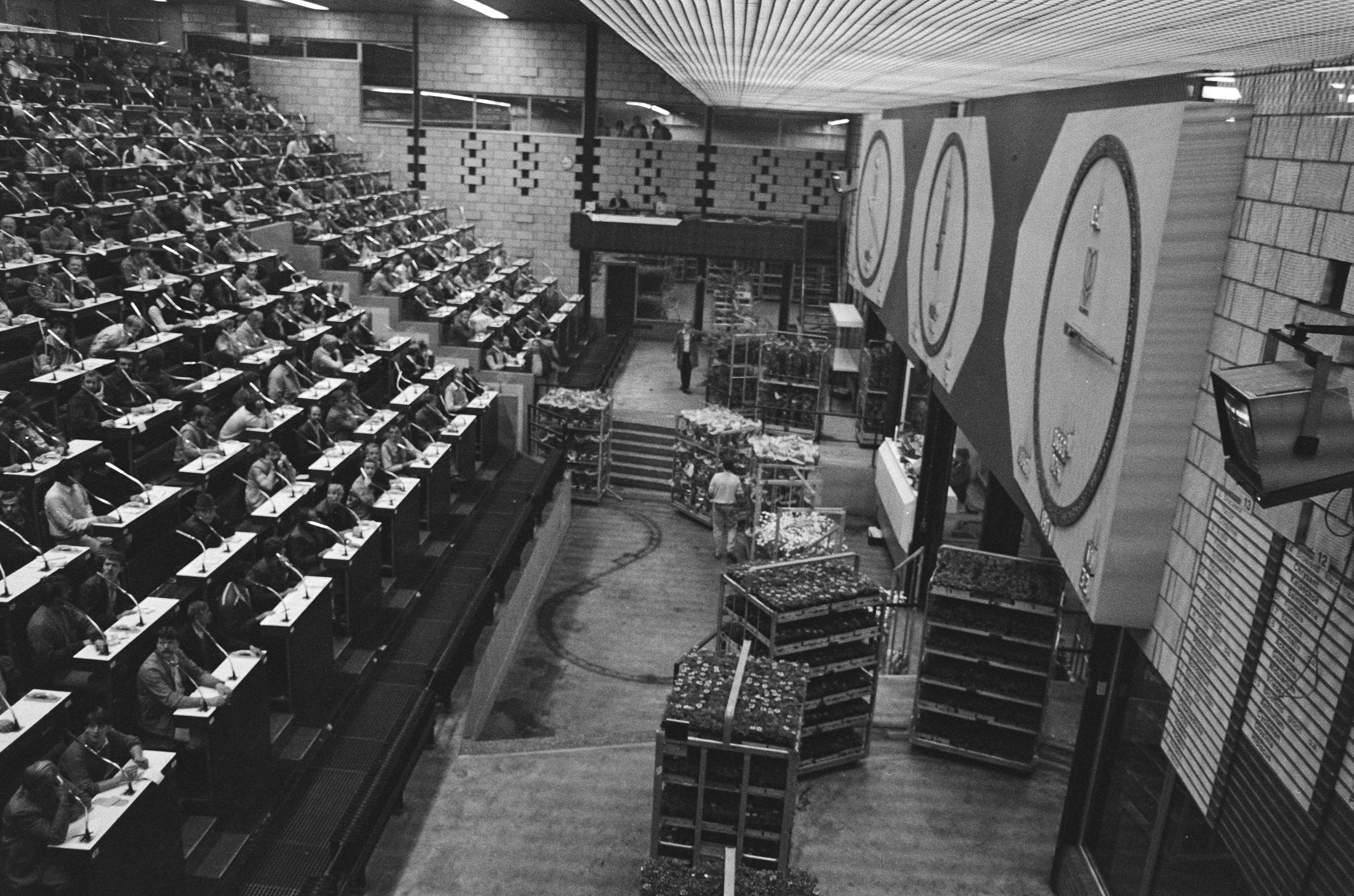
Dutch auction in Aalsmeer

=== Bidder's emotion ===
In Dutch auctions, bidders are unable to view other participants' bids; they can only view the winning bid. This leads to participants experiencing greater uncertainty when assessing the competitive dynamics of the Dutch auction. When losing, participants experience a stronger emotional response compared to when winning. This can be attributed to the instant-win feature of Dutch auctions. The winner is aware and assured of winning the auction and paying the winning price, whilst losing comes abruptly and as a surprise for the remaining participants.

In other words, bidders in Dutch auctions are more likely to experience winner regret, the belief that they overpaid, and loser regret, the belief that they underbid, because Dutch auctions evoke a stronger emotional response than other auction formats, as bidders are unable to seek signals (such as other bids) that can inform their bidding behaviour.

== Public offerings ==
Compared to the standard book building method, Dutch auctions have been considered for public offerings and price discovery. Dutch auctions have been praised as being more efficient and fairer, as they can prevent underwriters from allocating stocks to known or favoured clients. It has been suggested that improved efficiency in the IPO market is more likely to be felt in larger, already publicly listed companies, as buyers are typically hedge funds or mutual funds. As such, the market has already priced their shares and an indication of issue size already exists.

The United States Department of the Treasury, through the Federal Reserve Bank of New York (FRBNY), raises funds for the U.S. government using a Dutch auction. The FRBNY interacts with primary dealers, including large banks and broker-dealers, who submit bids on behalf of themselves and their clients using the Trading Room Automated Processing System (TRAPS) and are generally informed of winning bids within fifteen minutes.

For example, suppose the sponsor of the issuance seeks to raise $10 billion in ten-year notes with a 5.125% coupon. Bids are filled from the lowest yield/highest price until the entire $10 billion is raised – however, all filled bids receive the lowest cleared price, even those who bid a higher price (encouraging higher priced bids). In aggregate the bids are as follows:

- $1.00 billion at 5.115% (highest bid, lowest coupon)
- $2.50 billion at 5.120%
- $3.50 billion at 5.125%
- $4.50 billion at 5.130%
- $3.75 billion at 5.135%
- $2.75 billion at 5.140%
- $1.50 billion at 5.145% (lowest bid, highest coupon)

In this example, $10.00 billion is raised by the bids at and above the price of 5.130% yield; the auction clears at 5.130% yield. All filled bids thus receive this price. All higher-priced bids are first filled ($7.00 billion), leaving enough bonds ($3.00 billion) to fill 2/3rds of the bids at the clearing price; the other 1/3rd, and all lower price bids, are unfilled. In theory, this feature of the Dutch auction leads to more aggressive bidding, as those who (in this example) bid 5.115% receive the bonds at the lower price/higher yield of 5.130%.

A variation on the Dutch auction, OpenIPO, was developed by Bill Hambrecht and has been used for a number of US IPOs. Auctions have been used for hundreds of IPOs in more than two dozen countries but have not been popular with issuers and thus were replaced by other methods. One of the largest uniform price or "Dutch" auction IPOs was for Singapore Telecom in 1994. SRECTrade.com uses a two-sided Dutch auction to trade Solar Renewable Energy Credits (SRECs).

Dutch auction IPOs have been criticised for the possibility of tacit collusion and cartel-like behaviour, as the issuer has discretion over price and allocation. This possibility is more prevalent in primary market transactions.

== Dutch auction share repurchases ==
The introduction of the Dutch auction share repurchase in 1981 gives firms an alternative to the fixed price tender offer when executing a tender offer share repurchase. The first firm to use the Dutch auction was Todd Shipyards. A Dutch auction offer specifies a price range within which the shares are purchased. Shareholders can choose to tender their stock at any price within the stated range. The firm compiles these responses, creating a supply curve for the stock. The purchase price is the lowest price that allows the firm to buy the number of shares sought in the offer, and the firm pays that price to all investors who tendered at or below that price. If the number of shares tendered exceeds the number sought, the company purchases less than all shares tendered at or below the purchase price pro rata to all who tendered at or below the purchase price. If too few shares are tendered, then the firm either cancels the offer (provided it had been made conditional on a minimum acceptance), or it buys back all tendered shares at the maximum price.

== eBay ascending uniform-price mechanism ==
Rather than implementing a traditional Dutch auction, internet auction and e-commerce site eBay formerly (until 2009) offered a multi-quantity listing style. This allowed a person to bid by specifying a price and quantity collectively. This Dutch auction mechanism has been referred to as ascending uniform-price "Dutch" auction.

The units were sold per the price and quantity bidden that added up to the highest overall value. Each individual bidder paid the price of the bidder with the lowest winning price. However, they all were guaranteed the quantity they demanded in their original bid. This has been criticised in literature as not being a Dutch auction, because Dutch auctions guarantee not the price but rather the quantity demanded by a bidder.

== Slow Dutch auction ==
Dutch flower auctions are considered to be a particularly fast auction form with particularly low transaction costs, and they use an electronic device to lower the price. Sometimes, slower processes such as the bargain basement of Filene's Department Store in the USA, during which the discount on goods was increased over time until the goods were sold, are considered Dutch auctions. When faced with a positive cost of returning to the auction site, buyers prefer to purchase the object sooner (at a higher price) to economize on the cost of return. Therefore, when transaction costs are accounted for, Dutch auctions yield, on average, higher revenue than sealed-bid auctions. Holding electronic auctions reduces transaction costs substantially by relaxing physical and temporal constraints. In many cases, electronic markets enable competition in markets where competition was not possible before.

== Dutch auction format ==
Dutch auctions are all sellers' bidding auctions, also known as silent auctions, which can be divided into two types.

- Manual silent auction is an early traditional form of price reduction auction, in which the auctioneer first publicly quotes the highest price, and then the bidders respond accordingly. In the event of a price that no one bids for, the auctioneer will decrease the price and quote a new price, and decrease the price one by one, and the process will continue until someone buys it; if there are more than two bids, the auctioneer should quote a new price in increments.
- Dial-type silent auction was also invented by the Dutch and is a modern form of reduced-price auction. That is to say, the auctioneer first announces the highest price in public, which is displayed on the corresponding scale on the electronic auction clock, and then the bidder presses the button to bid one by one. Indicates a decrementing price reduction until someone pushes a button to stall it for a purchase. When there are more than two bids, the hands of the auction clock will rotate clockwise, indicating that the price will be increased until the last person left to stop. Here, the electronic auction bell replaces the wooden auction hammer as the transaction tool.

== Hybrid Dutch auction ==
The hybrid dutch auction is a new form of dutch auction that uses two methods that is the traditional dutch auction and sealed bid uniform price auction. Compared to the traditional dutch auction method, hybrid dutch auction comprises several stages consisting of:

- In the first stage, namely the classic dutch auction, the item's value continues to decrease gradually by 1%. If it has reached the minimum threshold price and no bidders putting offers, the first stage is declared complete.
- The second stage is a sealed bid uniform price auction. The winner of the first stage has the option to no longer participate in the second stage of the auction. In addition, the winner's price in the first stage is used as a minimum price and bidders bid privately, where bidders do not know the prices each other is bidding on. The second stage winner is taken from the bidder with the highest bidding price.
- In the final stage, the winner of the first stage auction may bid again at 10% higher than the second stage winner. If the first stage auction winner is willing to do this, he is the winner of hybrid dutch auction. But, if he cannot do this, the second stage winner is the winner of hybrid dutch auction.

The purpose of establishing the hybrid dutch auction is to overcome problems in the traditional dutch auction, which can lead to collusion and excessive payment. Auctioneer initially setting the highest price, and the bidders must bid lower the initial price until both the auctioneer and bidder reach an agreement. Collusion happens because bidders are able to collude in determining the price. Hybrid dutch auction reduces the probability of collusion and cartel by providing a minimum price limit, and the winner is drawn from the highest price bidder. In addition, in second stage auction, where the first stage winner has the ability to not take part in the second stage auction, he is able to increase his bid in the last stage. This action can increase the seller's profit. A hybrid dutch auction is also able to maintain the stability of the item price and gives benefit to both auctioneers and bidders.

== See also ==
- Auction rate security
- Bid-to-cover ratio
- Brazilian auction
