= OpenIPO =

OpenIPO is a modified Dutch auction which allows shares of an initial public offering (IPO) to be allocated impartially. It is a variation on the traditional way that shares are sold during the IPO process and results in all successful bidders paying the same price per share.

Based on an auction system designed by the economist William Vickrey, the OpenIPO auction uses a mathematical model to treat all qualifying bids impartially. It is similar to the model used to auction Treasury bills, notes, and bonds. Just like in a typical auction, the highest bidders win in an OpenIPO auction, but there are important differences. In the OpenIPO auction, the entire auction is private, and winning bidders all pay the same price per share — the public offering price.

WR Hambrecht + Co has used OpenIPO to take various companies public including Morningstar, Interactive Brokers Group, Overstock.com, Ravenswood Winery, Clean Energy Fuels, and Boston Beer Company. The company also functioned as co-manager to take Google public in 2004, using the Dutch auction system. Many traditional investment banks have balked at the idea of using an auction process, such as OpenIPO to engage in public securities offerings as this new method allows for equal access to the allocation of shares and eliminates the “behind the scenes” dealings of shares and favorable treatment often found in conventional IPOs. Despite other banks’ resistance to using this method, however, OpenIPO has been used for over 20 public offerings.

Financial historians Richard Sylla and Robert E. Wright have shown that before the Civil War, most early U.S. corporations sold shares in themselves directly to the public without the aid of intermediaries like investment banks. The direct public offering or DPO, as they term it, was not done by auction, but rather at a share price set by the issuing corporation. The DPO eliminated the agency problem associated with offerings intermediated by investment banks, but was not as effective at price discovery.

22 companies went public on major exchanges using IPO auctions in the U.S. between 1999-2008, but there have been none since then, as of May 2025. Starting in 2018 when Spotify went public, there have been at least 20 companies that have gone public using a direct listing. With both IPO auctions and direct listings, underwriters do not have discretion to allocate shares to their preferred clients..

The original implementation of OpenIPO was originally done by Charles Ocheret, Jordan Hayes, and Othar Hansson as Thinkbank, Inc. Later, as part of WR Hambrecht + Co the system was adapted for auctions of other asset classes, including the Freddie Mac Reference Note issuance and repurchase auction systems.
