= Wahkiakum County Eagle =

Weekly newspaper published in Cathlamet, Washington

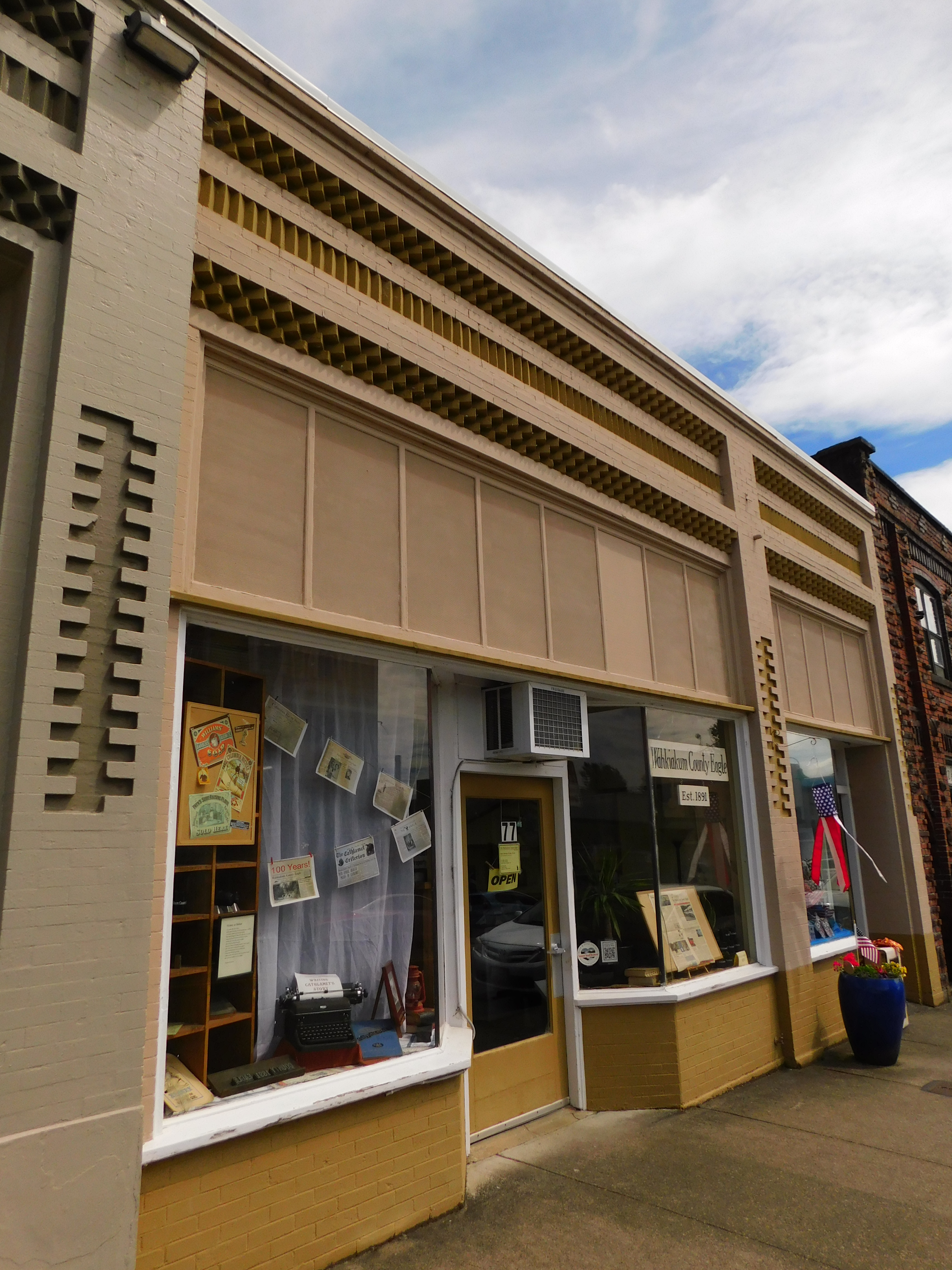
- Wahkiakum County Eagle building
- Type: Weekly newspaper
- Owner: Brian Fleming
- Founder: S.G. Williams
- Editor: Kirk McKnight
- Founded: 1891
- Language: English
- City: Cathlamet, Washington
- Circulation: 1,693 (as of 2022)
- OCLC number: 17377207
- Website: waheagle.com

The Wahkiakum County Eagle is a weekly newspaper, originally founded in 1891, based in Cathlamet and covering Wahkiakum County in the U.S. state of Washington.

== History ==
On May 14, 1891, S. G. Williams founded the Skamokawa Eagle in Skamokawa, Washington. It joined the Cathlamet Gazette in the local news field in this lower Columbia River county. Williams published the paper by Washington hand press until his death in 1925. The issue before he passed was produced by his granddaughters, Elizabeth and Carol Johnson. His 16-year-old niece then published the paper. In 1930, David F. Head of Cathlamet bought the paper; at the time it was thought to be the only newspaper in the Pacific Northwest still produced with a hand press.

In 1934, the Wahkiakum Publishing Company was organized and bought he paper from Head. Stockholders included Williams' daughter Mrs. Alice Johnson and D.F. Head's son John Head. Jack Hartline leased the paper and acted as editor and publisher. The paper was renamed to The Eagle and the printing plant was moved to Cathlamet. The paper was expanded from four to eight pages, and added features like comics and national news. In 1940, The Eagle acquired and absorbed a rival paper called the Columbia River Sun. Sun former owner Paul Hendrix served as company vice president and Eagle publisher until his failing health forced him to retire.

In April 1949, Albert Phelps and Hale Tabor, owners of the Kalama Bulletin, bought The Eagle from Hendrix. Later that year Ms. Dona B. Adams was appointed editor. In 1951, the Bulletin was sold and Tabor left Phelps to found the Bridgeport Chief. In 1952, the paper was renamed to the Lower Columbia Eagle. In June 1954, Phelps sold Lower Columbia Eagle to George Megrath, former editor of The Press in Petersburg, Alaska. Megrath also previously owned the Curry County Reporter. In September 1955, Daryl "Doc" Howell of South Dakota bought the paper. His wife Arlo Howell worked as editor. A year later Megrath bought the Bend Mid-Statesman, and then on Thanksgiving died in a car crash.

In June 1958, Alan Thompson became Eagle editor. In November 1960, Thompson was appointed administrative assistant to Congresswoman-elect Julia Butler Hansen. At that time he sold the paper to Donald H. Smith in order to accept the position. In October 1962, Thompson resigned and returned to Cathlamet to resume ownership of the Eagle. In January 1963, he purchased the Cowlitz County Advocate in Castle Rock. Eric Robert "Bob" Nelson was then hired as editor of the Eagle. In November 1965, Thompson started the Lewis County News in Winlock, a successor to the defunct Winlock News.

The Lower Columbia Eagle was renamed to the Wahkiakum County Eagle, which Nelson purchased from Thompson in December 1966. Nelson's son Eric Robert "Rick" Nelson, Jr. joined his father at the Cathlamet paper in January 1979, after having worked at The Whidbey Island Record. In 2006, Bob Nelson died. In 2023, Rick Nelson died. His son Jacob Nelson and husband Brandon Simmons took over after Rick's death. Both continued in their existing careers while managing the Eagle. In 2026, the paper was sold to Longview businessman Brian Fleming.
