= Bid-to-cover ratio =

Bid-To-Cover Ratio is a ratio used to measure the demand for a particular security during offerings and auctions. In general, it is used for shares, bonds, and other securities. It may be computed in two ways: either the number of bids received divided by the number of bids accepted, or the value of bids received divided by the value of bids accepted.

The higher the ratio, the higher the demand. A ratio above 2.0 indicates a successful auction with aggressive bids. A lower reading indicates weak demand and is said to have a long tail (a wide spread between the average and the high yield).

== Example ==
For example, suppose debt managers are seeking to raise $10 billion in ten-year notes, and, in aggregate, they have received seven bids from lenders as follows:

- Bid 1 for $1.00 billion at 5.115%
- Bid 2 for $2.50 billion at 5.120%
- Bid 3 for $3.50 billion at 5.125%
- Bid 4 for $4.50 billion at 5.130%
- Bid 5 for $3.75 billion at 5.135%
- Bid 6 for $2.75 billion at 5.140%
- Bid 7 for $1.50 billion at 5.145%

The total of all bids received is $19.5 billion, and the number of bids accepted would be $10 billion, therefore leading to a bid-to-cover ratio of 1.95 (calculated by the value method). Since the managers are interested in raising the cheapest debt possible, bids 1, 2, 3 will be covered in full ($7 billion). Bid 4 will be partially covered ($3 billion out of $4.5 billion). Bids 5, 6, 7 will be rejected. The final coupon will be fixed at 5.130% (the rate of the last bid accepted) for all the bids covered.

== See also ==
- Dutch auction
- Overallotment option
