= Washington's 19th legislative district =

American legislative district

Coordinates: 46°35′N 123°35′W

Washington's 19th legislative district map

Washington's 19th legislative district is one of forty-nine districts in Washington state for representation in the state legislature.

The district includes the western extreme of the state south of the Olympic Peninsula and runs from Aberdeen to Longview.

This mostly rural district is represented by state senator Jeff Wilson and state representatives Jim Walsh (position 1) and Joel McEntire (position 2), all Republicans.

== Members ==
- Carol Monohon

== See also ==
- Washington Redistricting Commission
- Washington State Legislature
- Washington State Senate
- Washington House of Representatives
