= KPPK =

Radio station in Rainier, Oregon

- Rainier, Oregon; United States
- Broadcast area: Longview, Washington
- Frequency: 98.3 MHz
- Branding: The Peak

Programming
- Format: Adult hits

Ownership
- Owner: Bicoastal Media Licenses IV, LLC
- Sister stations: KBAM, KEDO, KLYK, KRQT

History
- First air date: 2005
- Former call signs: KJNI (5/2-9/16/2005, CP)

Technical information
- Licensing authority: FCC
- Facility ID: 164098
- Class: A
- ERP: 1,600 watts
- HAAT: 195 meters (640 ft)
- Transmitter coordinates: 46°10′58.4″N 122°57′33.4″W

Links
- Public license information: Public file; LMS
- Webcast: Listen Live

KPPK (98.3 FM) is a radio station licensed to Rainier, Oregon, United States. The station is currently owned by Bicoastal Media Licenses IV, LLC.

== History ==
The station was assigned the call letters KJNI on May 2, 2005. On September 16, 2005, the station changed its call sign to the current KPPK. on April 29, 2005 the station was sold to Bicoastal Longview and on December 31, 2007 the station was sold to Bicoastal Media Licenses IV.
