= KLYK =

- Kelso, Washington; United States
- Broadcast area: Longview, Washington
- Frequency: 94.5 MHz
- Branding: 93.5 and 94.5 KLYK

Programming
- Format: Adult Top 40
- Affiliations: Premiere Networks; Westwood One

Ownership
- Owner: Bicoastal Media Licenses IV, LLC
- Sister stations: KBAM, KEDO, KPPK, KRQT

History
- First air date: 1991 (as KUKN)
- Former call signs: KUKN (1991–2003)

Technical information
- Licensing authority: FCC
- Facility ID: 71007
- Class: A
- ERP: 3,000 watts
- HAAT: 145 meters (476 ft)
- Transmitter coordinates: 46°16′49″N 122°52′34″W
- Translator: 93.5 K228FA (Longview)

Links
- Public license information: Public file; LMS
- Webcast: Listen live
- Website: klykradio.com

KLYK (94.5 FM) is a radio station broadcasting an Adult Top 40 format. Licensed to Kelso, Washington, United States, the station is currently owned by Bicoastal Media Licenses IV, LLC and features programming from Premiere Networks and Westwood One. The station focuses on Today's Best Music with the slogan "Southwest Washington's Hit Music Channel."

== Programming ==
Monday-Friday

1-6 AM: Kendall

6-10 AM: Bernie Mack

10 AM-3 PM: Venetia

3-8 PM: Chuck D

8 PM-1 AM: Charlee

Saturday

Sunday

12-4 PM: AT40 with Ryan Seacrest

Former logo
