= KBAM =

KBAM may refer to:

- Battle Mountain Airport (ICAO code KBAM)
- KBAM (AM), a radio station (1400 AM) licensed to serve Longview, Washington, United States
- KEDO (AM), a radio station (1270 AM) licensed to serve Longview, Washington, which held the call sign KBAM from 1955 to 2021
