= KEDO =

KEDO may refer to:

- Korean Peninsula Energy Development Organization
- KEDO (AM), a radio station (1270 AM) licensed to serve Longview, Washington, United States
- KBAM (AM), a radio station (1400 AM) licensed to serve Longview, Washington, which held the call sign KEDO from 1958 to 2021
