= Seattle Seahawks =

NFL team in Seattle, Washington

- Current season
Logo	Wordmark
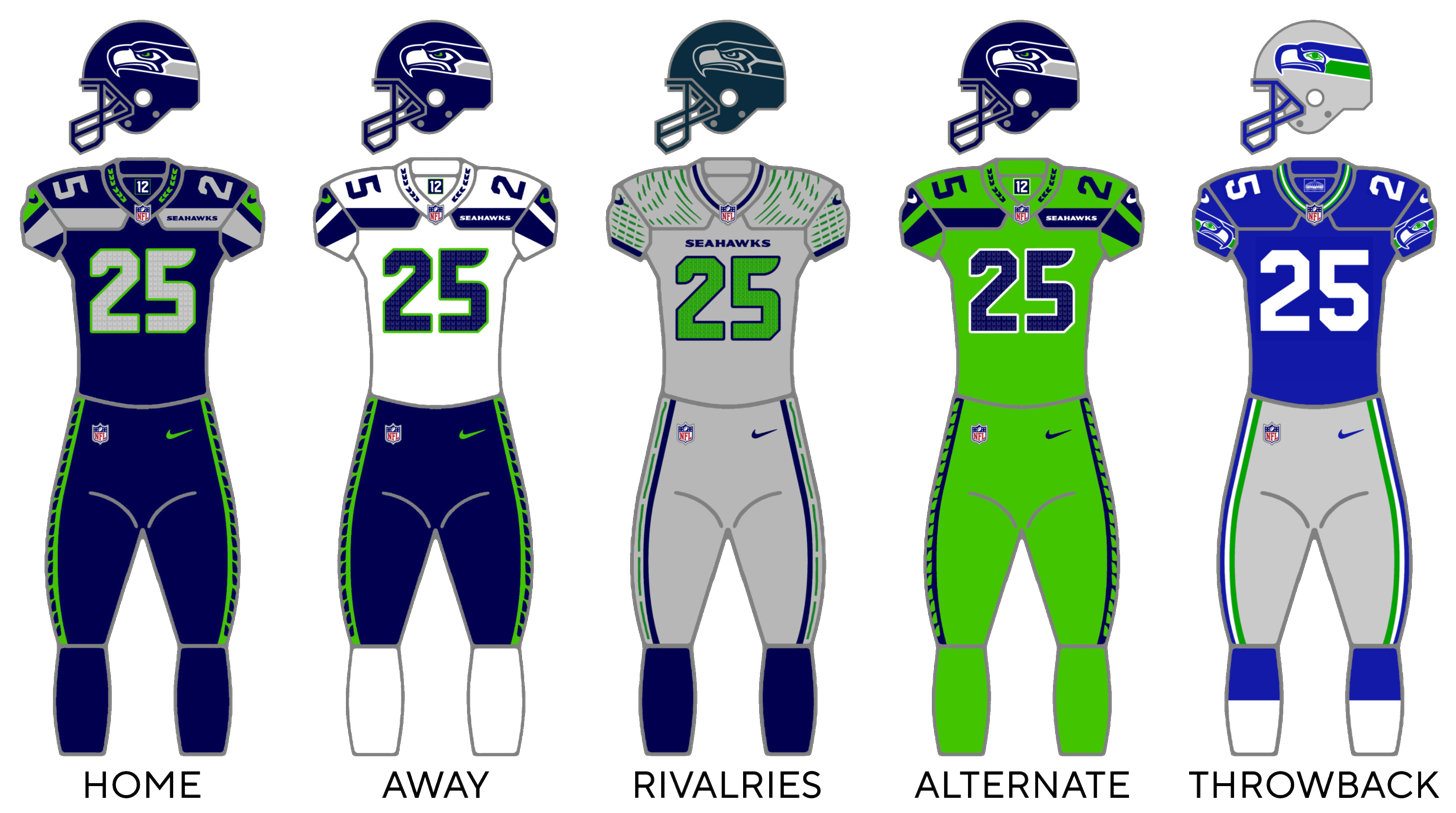
- Uniforms

General information
- Founded: June 4, 1974; 52 years ago
- Stadium: Lumen Field; Seattle, Washington, U.S.
- Headquartered: Virginia Mason Athletic Center; Renton, Washington
- Colors: College navy, action green, wolf grey
- Mascot: Blitz, Boom, Taima the Hawk (Augur buzzard)
- Website: seahawks.com

Personnel
- Owner: Neeru Khosla (Note: Vinod Khosla is also a member of the ownership group.)
- General manager: John Schneider
- Head coach: Mike Macdonald
- President: Chuck Arnold

Nicknames
- The Hawks; The Blue Wave (1984–1986); The Legion of Boom (secondary; 2011–2017); The Dark Side (defense; 2025–present)

Team history
- Seattle Seahawks (1976–present)

Home fields
- Kingdome (1976–1999); Husky Stadium (1994, 2000–2001); Lumen Field (2002–present)

League / conference affiliations
- National Football League (1976–present): American Football Conference (1977–2001); AFC West (1977–2001); National Football Conference (1976, 2002–present); NFC West (1976, 2002–present)

Championships
- Super Bowl championships: 2 2013 (XLVIII), 2025 (LX)
- Conference championships: 4: NFC: 2005, 2013, 2014, 2025
- Division championships: 12: AFC West: 1988, 1999; NFC West: 2004, 2005, 2006, 2007, 2010, 2013, 2014, 2016, 2020, 2025

Playoff appearances (21)
- NFL: 1983, 1984, 1987, 1988, 1999, 2003, 2004, 2005, 2006, 2007, 2010, 2012, 2013, 2014, 2015, 2016, 2018, 2019, 2020, 2022, 2025

Owners
- Nordstrom family & Herman Sarkowsky (1974–1988); Ken Behring & Ken Hofmann (1988–1997); Paul Allen (1997–2018); Paul Allen estate (2018–2026); Neeru Khosla (2026–present)

The Seattle Seahawks are a professional American football team based in Seattle. The Seahawks compete in the National Football League (NFL) as a member of the National Football Conference (NFC) West division. They have played their home games at Lumen Field in Seattle's SoDo neighborhood since 2002. The only NFL team in the Pacific Northwest, the Seahawks are named for the osprey, a species of bird also referred to as the sea hawk.

The Seahawks joined the NFL in 1976, as an expansion team in the NFC West. From 1977 to 2001, Seattle was assigned to the American Football Conference (AFC) West; the team rejoined the NFC in 2002. From 1976 to 1999, the Seahawks played in the Kingdome, alongside fellow 1970s Seattle sports establishments in the Mariners, SuperSonics, and Sounders. (Note: The Seattle Seahawks played two preseason and three regular season home games of the 1994 season at Husky Stadium due to repairs at the Kingdome.) The Seahawks briefly played in Husky Stadium from 2000 to 2001, before moving to Lumen Field, on the former ground of the Kingdome, which they share with Sounders FC and Reign FC.

Seahawks fans, then collectively referred to as the "12th man" (officially known as the 12s since 2016), set the Guinness World Record for the loudest crowd noise at a sporting event twice during the 2013 NFL season. As the only NFL team in the northwestern United States, the Seahawks attract support from a wide geographical area including the U.S. states of Alaska, Idaho, Montana, Oregon, and Utah, as well as the Canadian province of British Columbia.

The Seahawks struggled during their time in the AFC, making occasional playoff appearances under head coach Chuck Knox. Their first extended success came in the NFC West under head coach Mike Holmgren, leading them to four consecutive division championships and the team's first Super Bowl appearance in Super Bowl XL. They achieved their greatest success in the 2010s, under head coach Pete Carroll and the historic Legion of Boom defense, achieving five consecutive 10+ win seasons and appearing in back-to-back Super Bowls, including the first victory in franchise history, blowing out the Denver Broncos in Super Bowl XLVIII before failing to repeat as champions in Super Bowl XLIX. In the 2025-2026 season, head coach Mike Macdonald led the Seahawks to another championship in Super Bowl LX.

The Seahawks have won 12 division titles, 4 conference championships, and are the only team to have played in both the AFC and NFC Championship Games. Since joining the division in the 2002 reorganization, the Seahawks have led the NFC West in division titles, having won the division 10 times, most recently in 2025. From 2011 to 2016, the Seahawks set an NFL record for playing 95 consecutive games without losing by more than 10 points.

Seahawks players Kenny Easley, Walter Jones, Steve Hutchinson, Cortez Kennedy, and Steve Largent have been voted into the Pro Football Hall of Fame primarily or wholly for their accomplishments as Seahawks. In addition, players Dave Brown, Jacob Green, Dave Krieg, Curt Warner, Jim Zorn, Matt Hasselbeck and Shaun Alexander have been inducted into the Seahawks Ring of Honor, along with head coaches Chuck Knox and Mike Holmgren, radio announcer Pete Gross, and former franchise owner Paul Allen.

In 2026, the Seahawks were purchased by a group led by Vinod Khosla, with the $9.612 billion purchase the most expensive in NFL history and, for a short time, the most expensive in sports history.

== History ==
=== Nordstrom / Sarkowsky era (1976–1988) ===
Under the terms of the 1970 AFL–NFL merger, the NFL began planning to expand from 26 to 28 teams. In June 1972, Seattle Professional Football Inc., a group of Seattle business and community leaders, announced its intention to acquire an NFL franchise for the city of Seattle. In June 1974, the NFL gave the city an expansion franchise. That December, NFL commissioner Pete Rozelle announced the official signing of the franchise agreement by Lloyd W. Nordstrom, representing the Nordstrom family as majority partners for the consortium; the cost of the franchise was $16 million.

In March 1975, the owners hired as general manager John Thompson, a former executive director of the NFL Management Council and former Washington Huskies executive. The name Seattle Seahawks ("seahawk" is another name for osprey) was picked on June 17, 1975, after a public contest that drew more than 20,000 entries proposing more than 1,700 names, including Skippers, Pioneers, and Lumberjacks.

Thompson recruited and hired Jack Patera, a Minnesota Vikings assistant coach, to be the first head coach of the Seahawks; the hiring was announced on January 3, 1976. The expansion draft was held March 30–31, 1976, with Seattle and the Tampa Bay Buccaneers alternating picks for rounds selecting unprotected players from the other 26 teams in the league. The Seahawks were awarded the second overall pick in the 1976 draft, which they used to acquire defensive tackle Steve Niehaus. The team took the field for the first time on August 1, 1976, in a pre-season game against the San Francisco 49ers in the new Kingdome.

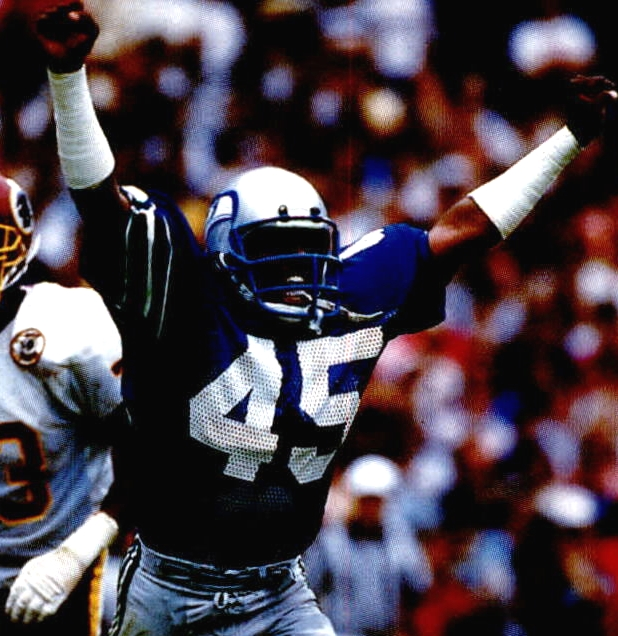
Hall of Fame safety Kenny Easley, a defensive unit leader for Seattle in the 1980s, was a top defensive player in the NFL and one of the Seahawks' all-time greatest players.

The Seahawks are the only NFL team to switch conferences twice since the merger. The franchise began play in 1976 in the NFC West but switched conferences with the Buccaneers after one season to join the AFC West. This was dictated by the league as part of the 1976 expansion plan, so that both expansion teams could play each other twice and every other NFL franchise once during their first two seasons. The Seahawks won both matchups against the Buccaneers, the first of which was the Seahawks' first regular-season victory.

In 1983, the Seahawks hired Chuck Knox as head coach. Finishing with a 9–7 record, the Seahawks made their first post-season appearance, defeating the Denver Broncos in the Wild Card Round, and then the Miami Dolphins, before losing in the AFC Championship to the eventual Super Bowl champion Los Angeles Raiders. The next season was the Seahawks' best to that point, finishing 12–4; it would remain the franchise's best until 2005. Knox won the NFL Coach of the Year Award.

=== Behring / Hofmann era (1988–1996) ===
In 1988, Ken Behring and partner Ken Hofmann purchased the team for a reported $80 million. The Seahawks won their first division title in 1988, but missed the playoffs in the next three seasons, after which Knox left the team. For most of the 1990s, the Seahawks continued to struggle. They saw three consecutive losing seasons (1992–1994) under head coach Tom Flores, including a franchise worst 2–14 season in 1992. After the 1994 season, Flores was fired and Dennis Erickson was brought in as head coach.

=== Paul Allen era (1997–2018) ===
In 1996, Behring and Hoffman transferred the team's operations to Anaheim, California, although the team continued to play in Seattle. They also contemplated moving the team itself, which was in bankruptcy for a short period. The move was widely criticized. The NFL threatened Behring with a $500,000-per-day fine if he did not move the team's operations back to Seattle.

The following year, Behring and Hoffman sold the team to Microsoft co-founder Paul Allen for $200 million.

Erickson's tenure as head coach ended after the 1998 season; the Seahawks missed the playoffs for all four of his seasons with the team, extending their playoff drought to ten seasons.

=== Mike Holmgren era (1999–2008) ===
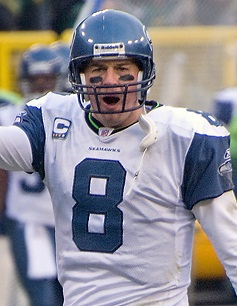
Matt Hasselbeck played as the Seahawks quarterback from 2001 to 2010 and led the team to six postseason appearances and a Super Bowl appearance.

In 1999, Mike Holmgren was hired as head coach, and led the team for ten seasons. The Seahawks (9–7) won their second division title in 1999, but lost at home in the playoffs to the wild card Miami Dolphins 20–17, in the final NFL game played in the Kingdome.

==== Realignment to NFC West and new stadium (2002) ====
In 2002, the Seahawks returned to the NFC West as part of an NFL realignment plan that gave each conference four balanced divisions of four teams each. This restored the AFC West to its initial post-merger roster of original AFL teams Denver, San Diego, Kansas City, and Oakland. That same year, the team opened its new home, Seahawks Stadium, following two seasons at Husky Stadium after the Kingdome's implosion in March 2000.

In 2005, the Seahawks had their best regular season (13–3) in franchise history (matched in 2013 and surpassed in 2025), including a 42–0 shutout at Philadelphia on Monday night in early December. The top seed in the NFC, Seattle defeated the Washington Redskins 20–10 in the divisional round of the playoffs, won the NFC Championship Game 34–14 over the Carolina Panthers, but lost in Super Bowl XL against the Pittsburgh Steelers. The loss was controversial; NFL Films has Super Bowl XL at number 8 on its top ten list of games with controversial officiating. Referee Bill Leavy later admitted that he missed calls that altered the game. Before 2005, the Seahawks had not won a playoff game since December 22, 1984, a streak of 21 years (five teams had ever had a drought of twenty years at the time, with their six straight losses being tied for third-most in history). That drought ended with the win over Washington.

In the 2006 season, the Seahawks finished 9–7 and won the NFC West. The defeated the Dallas Cowboys 21–20 in the Wild Card Round before losing to the Chicago Bears 27–24 in the Divisional Round. In the 2007 season, the Seahawks finished 10–6 and won the NFC West. The team defeated Washington in the Wild Card Round 35–14 before losing to the Green Bay Packers in the Divisional Round 42–20. The 2008 season saw the team go 4–12 and finish third in the NFC West. Holmgren departed from the team after the 2008 season, after the end of his contract.

=== Jim L. Mora era (2009) ===
Defensive backs coach Jim L. Mora was named as Holmgren's successor. In 2009, the Seahawks finished 3rd in the NFC West with a 5–11 record. Shortly after, Mora was fired on January 8, 2010 and Pete Carroll was hired.

=== Pete Carroll era (2010–2023) ===
==== Pre-Super Bowl (2010–2012) ====
In the 2010 NFL season, the Seahawks made history by making the playoffs despite a 7–9 record. They had the best record in a division full of teams with losing seasons (Seahawks 7–9, Rams 7–9, 49ers 6–10, Cardinals 5–11) and won the decisive season finale against the Rams (not only by overall record, but by division record, as both teams coming into the game had a 3–2 division record). In the playoffs, the Seahawks beat the defending Super Bowl XLIV champs, the New Orleans Saints, 41–36. The Seahawks made even more history when Marshawn Lynch made a 67-yard run, breaking nine tackles, to clinch the victory. The fans reacted so loudly that a small earthquake (a bit above 2 magnitude) was recorded by seismic equipment around Seattle. Lynch's run would be nicknamed the "Beast Quake". The Seahawks lost to the Bears in their second game, 35–24. The 2011 season saw the team go 7–9 once again, but they were not able to get into the postseason with a third-place finish in the NFC West.

The 2012 NFL season started with doubt, as the Seahawks lost their season opener against the Arizona Cardinals. The highly touted Seattle defense gave up a go-ahead score late in the fourth quarter, and rookie quarterback Russell Wilson failed to throw the game-winning touchdown after multiple attempts in the red-zone. However, Russell Wilson and the Seahawks went 4–1 in their next five games en route to an 11–5 overall record (their first winning record since 2007). Their 2012 campaign included big wins over the Green Bay Packers, New England Patriots, and San Francisco 49ers. The Seahawks went into the playoffs as the No. 5 seed and the only team that season to go undefeated at home. In the Wild Card Round, the Seahawks overcame a 14-point deficit to defeat the Washington Redskins. This was the first time since the 1983 Divisional Round that the Seahawks won a playoff game on the road. However, in the 2012 Divisional Round, overcoming a 20-point, fourth-quarter deficit would not be enough to defeat the #1 seed Atlanta Falcons. An ill-advised timeout and a defensive breakdown late in the game cost the Seahawks their season, as they lost, 30–28. Quarterback Russell Wilson won the 2012 Pepsi MAX Rookie of the Year award.

==== Super Bowl XLVIII champions (2013) ====
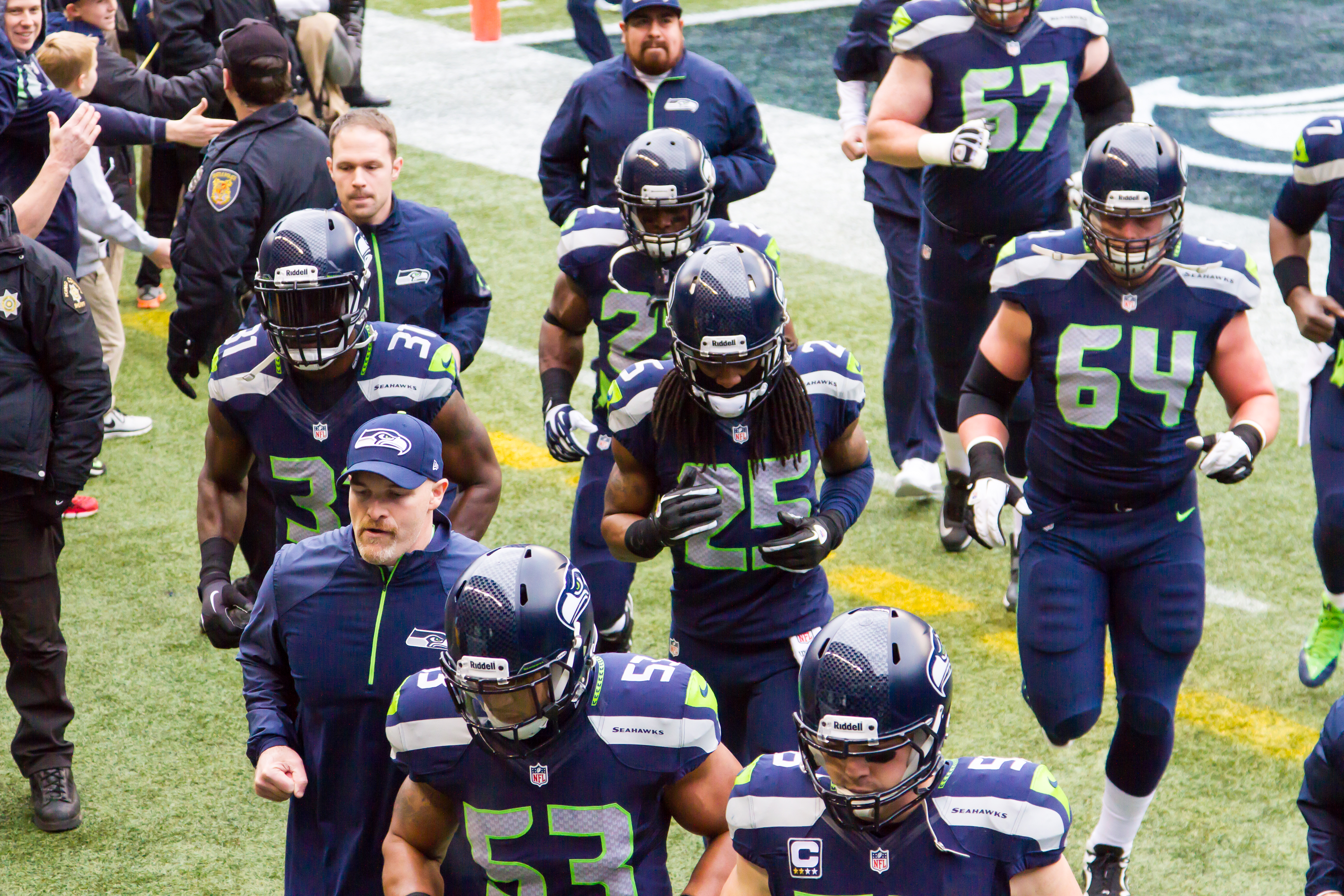
Seahawks players and coaches in 2013

In the 2013 NFL season, the Seahawks continued their momentum from the previous season, finishing tied with the Denver Broncos for an NFL-best regular season record of 13–3, while earning the NFC's #1 playoff seed. Their 2013 campaign included big wins over the Carolina Panthers, New Orleans Saints, and the San Francisco 49ers. Six Seahawks players were named to the Pro Bowl: Quarterback Russell Wilson, center Max Unger, running back Marshawn Lynch, cornerback Richard Sherman, free safety Earl Thomas, and strong safety Kam Chancellor. However, none of them were able to play in the Pro Bowl, as the Seahawks defeated the New Orleans Saints 23–15 and the San Francisco 49ers 23–17 in the playoffs to advance to Super Bowl XLVIII against the Denver Broncos. On February 2, 2014, the Seahawks won the franchise's first Super Bowl Championship, defeating the Broncos 43–8. The Seahawks' defensive performance in 2013 was acclaimed as one of the best in the Super Bowl era.

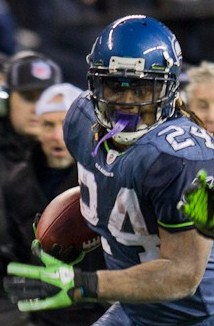
Marshawn Lynch scored on a 67-yard touchdown run in the NFC Wild-Card Playoff Game against the New Orleans Saints in 2011.

==== Post-championship years, death of Paul Allen, takeover by Jody Allen (2014–2023) ====
The 2014 campaign saw the team lose some key pieces, including wide receiver Golden Tate to free agency and wide receiver Sidney Rice and defensive end Chris Clemons to retirement. Percy Harvin was also let go mid-season after several underachieving weeks and clashes with the rest of the locker room. Despite starting 3–3, they rallied to a 12–4 record, good enough once again for the #1 seed in the NFC Playoffs. After dispatching the Carolina Panthers handily in the Divisional Round 31–17, they faced the Green Bay Packers in the NFC Championship Game. Despite five turnovers and trailing 19–7 late in the contest, the Seahawks prevailed in overtime to reach Super Bowl XLIX against the New England Patriots, but an interception at the 1-yard line late in the championship game stymied a comeback attempt and thwarted the Seahawks' bid to be the first repeat Super Bowl champions since the Patriots won Super Bowls XXXVIII and XXXIX.

The Seahawks returned to the playoffs in both 2015 and 2016, but, despite winning the Wild Card game in both years, they failed to win either Divisional round game on the road. The 2017 iteration of the team missed the playoffs for the first time in six years, as injuries to their core players coupled with disappointing acquisitions of running back Eddie Lacy and kicker Blair Walsh failed them in a competitive NFC. The team cut ties with most of the remaining players that had been part of their meteoric rise and turnover both their offensive and defensive coaching staff in 2018, and an influx of young talent helped propel the team to a 10–6 record and another playoff berth that ultimately ended in a loss in the Wild Card game to the Dallas Cowboys. In October 2018, owner Paul Allen died after a prolonged fight with cancer.

In 2019, the Seahawks put up their best record since their last trip to the Super Bowl at 11–5, but they still lost three out of their last four games and lost their chance to win the NFC West. After defeating the Philadelphia Eagles 17–9 in the Wild Card game, they lost to the Green Bay Packers in the Divisional Round, failing another attempt at a second Super Bowl. His sister Jody Allen would take control of the team in the next year.

The 2020 season saw the Seahawks win their first five games, a franchise-best for a start to a season. Despite the Seahawks losing three of their next four games, they finished strong, earning twelve victories for the first time since their Super Bowl season in 2014, and winning the division for the first time in four years. However, despite the 12–4 record and the division title, the Seahawks' season ended the following week against the Los Angeles Rams, who never trailed in a 30–20 victory. The Seahawks struggled and started the 2021 season 3–8. Russell Wilson had an injured finger missing 3 games and the Seahawks were shut out the first time in the Wilson era in Week 10 against the Green Bay Packers. This was their worst first half of a season since 2009, under then-head coach Jim Mora. The Seahawks were eliminated from playoff contention on December 26 in a loss to the Chicago Bears, and they finished last in their division for the first time since 1996. With wins over the Detroit Lions and the Arizona Cardinals they finished 7–10.

The 2021 season was followed by an offseason of change, punctuated with the trade of quarterback Russell Wilson to the team he and the Seahawks beat in Super Bowl XLVIII, the Denver Broncos, on March 6, 2022. The Broncos traded quarterback Drew Lock, tight end Noah Fant, defensive end Shelby Harris, two first-round picks (for that year's draft, No. 9 overall, and 2023's), two second-round picks (that year's, No. 40 overall, and 2023's) and a 2022 fifth-round selection to the Seahawks for Wilson and a 2022 fourth-round pick. Another hallmark franchise player from the Super Bowl-winning Seahawks, former All-Pro linebacker Bobby Wagner, was cut by the team that same day, a move that saved them $16.6 million in cap space. The Seahawks also took on $26 million in dead money by trading Wilson; ESPN Stats & Information research revealed it to be the second-most dead money a team has ever incurred, trailing the $33.8 million the Philadelphia Eagles ate in their trade of Carson Wentz the previous year.

In the 2022 season, the Seahawks finished with a 9–8 record and made the playoffs. The team's season ended in the Wild Card round with a 41–23 loss to the San Francisco 49ers. The 2023 season saw the Seahawks finish 9–8 and miss the postseason. Carroll was fired from his head coaching position after the 2023 season. Carroll remained with the team in an unspecified advisory role.

=== Mike Macdonald era (2024–present) and Vinod Khosla era (2026–present) ===
Mike Macdonald, formerly defensive coordinator of the Baltimore Ravens, was hired as the new head coach. In the 2024 season, the Seahawks went 10–7 but missed the postseason.

In the 2025 season, Seattle achieved a 14–3 record, the best regular season record in franchise history, won the NFC West, and held the #1 seed in the conference for the playoffs. In the Divisional Round, the Seahawks defeated the San Francisco 49ers 41–6. Seattle then defeated the Los Angeles Rams 31–27 in the NFC Championship Game to set up a rematch of Super Bowl XLIX with the New England Patriots in Super Bowl LX, which they won by the score of 29–13 in a dominating defensive performance. Weeks after the Super Bowl victory, The Paul Allen Estate announced they had initiated the process to sell the team. An investor group led by Vinod Khosla, the co-founder of Sun Microsystems, reached an agreement to buy the team in July 2026. The $9.612 billion sale, a record for an NFL franchise, was formally approved by the league on August 26, 2026, and was completed on September 3. The new ownership group has 12 co-owners, including private equity firms Sixth Street Partners and The Carlyle Group with Dynasty Equity.

Seahawks' training camp for the 2026 season featured on HBO's Hard Knocks, debuting on August 4. It marked the first time the franchise has been on the show, and the first time the program has focused on a defending Super Bowl Champion.

== Logos and uniforms ==
The Seahawks uniform, 1976–1982.

When the Seahawks debuted in 1976, the team's logo was a stylized royal blue and forest green eagle or thunderbird head based on Kwakwakaʼwakw art masks. The team nickname Seahawks is a historical nickname for an osprey. Though the nickname may describe an osprey, the weight of the beak of the bird depicted on the Kwakwaka'wakw mask from the Burke Museum, from where the logo originated, is indicative of an eagle or thunderbird, and not of an osprey. The helmet and pants were silver while the home jerseys were royal blue with white and green sleeve stripes and white numerals and names. The road jersey was white, with white, blue and green sleeve stripes and had blue numerals and names. The socks were blue and had the same green and white striping pattern seen on the blue jerseys. Black shoes were worn for the first four seasons, one of the few NFL teams that did so in the late 1970s, at a time when most teams were wearing white shoes. They would switch to white shoes in 1980.

In 1983, coinciding with the arrival of Chuck Knox as head coach, the uniforms were updated slightly. The striping on the arms now incorporated the Seahawks logo, and the TV numbers, previously located on the sleeves, moved onto the shoulders. The helmet facemasks changed from gray to blue. Also, the socks went solid blue at the top, and white on bottom. In the 1985 season, the team wore 10th Anniversary patches on the left side of their pants. It had the Seahawks logo streaking through the number 10. In 1994, the year of the NFL's 75th Anniversary, the Seahawks changed the style of their numbering to something more suitable for the team; Pro Block from then until 2001. That same year, the Seahawks wore a vintage jersey for select games resembling the 1976–82 uniforms. However, the helmet facemasks remained blue. The logos also became sewn on instead of being screen-printed. In 2000, Shaun Alexander's rookie year and Cortez Kennedy's last, the Seattle Seahawks celebrated their 25th Anniversary; the logo was worn on the upper left chest of the jersey. In 2001, the Seahawks switched to the new Reebok uniform system still in their then-current uniforms after that company signed a 10-year deal to be the exclusive uniform supplier to the NFL, but it would be their last in this uniform after the season ended. Before this, various companies made the team's uniforms.

Seattle Seahawks uniform combinations, 2002–2011. A green alternate jersey was used, but only for one game of the 2009 season.

On March 1, 2002, to coincide with the team moving to the NFC as well as the opening of Seahawks Stadium, both the logo and the uniforms were heavily redesigned. The Wordmark was designed by Mark Verlander and the logo was designed by NFL Properties in-house design team. The colors were modified to a lighter "Seahawks Blue", a darker "Seahawks Navy" and lime green piping. The helmets also were changed from silver to the lighter "Seahawks Blue" color after a fan poll was conducted. Silver would not be seen again until 2012. The logo artwork was also subtly altered, with an arched eyebrow and a forward-facing pupil suggesting a more aggressive-looking bird. At first, the team had planned to wear silver helmets at home and blue helmets on the road, but since NFL rules forbid the use of multiple helmets, the team held the fan poll to decide which color helmet would be worn. The team had usually worn all blue at home and all white on the road since 2003, but late in the 2009 season, the Seahawks wore the white jersey-blue pants combo. The blue jersey and white pants combo has been worn for only one regular-season game, the 2005 season opener at the Jacksonville Jaguars, while the white jersey and blue pants combination has not been worn regularly since late in the 2002 season, with the exception of late in the 2009 season. In 2009, the Seahawks once again wore the white jersey and blue pants combination for road games against Minnesota (November 22), St. Louis (November 29), Houston (December 13), and Green Bay (December 27).

The Seahawks wore their home blue jerseys during Super Bowl XL despite being designated as the visitor, since the Pittsburgh Steelers, the designated home team, elected to wear their white jerseys.

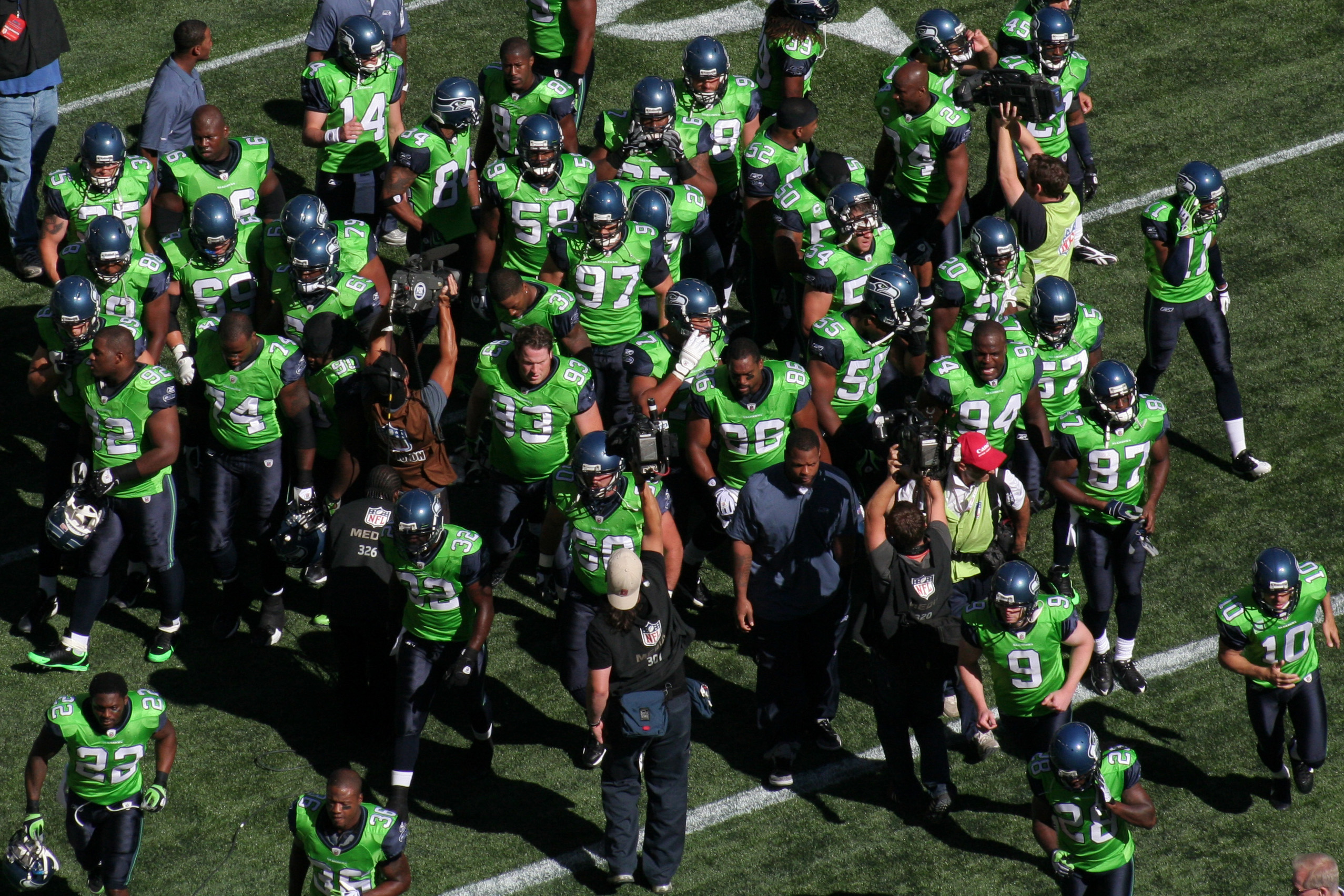
Seahawks players wearing green jerseys in 2009.

On September 27, 2009, the Seahawks wore lime green jerseys for the first time, paired with new dark navy blue pants in a game against the Chicago Bears. The jerseys matched their new sister team, the expansion Seattle Sounders FC of Major League Soccer who wear green jerseys with blue pants. On December 6, 2009, the Seahawks wore their Seahawks blue jersey with the new dark navy blue pants for the first time, in a game against the San Francisco 49ers. The Seahawks broke out the same combo two weeks later against the Tampa Bay Buccaneers, and two weeks after that in the 2009 regular-season finale against the Tennessee Titans. In December 2009, then-coach Jim Mora announced that the new lime green jerseys were being retired because the team did not win in them, because he liked the standard blue home jerseys better, and added that the home jersey is a better match for the navy pants. In the same press conference, he stated that the new navy pants "felt better" on players as opposed to the Seahawks blue pants. For the 2010 season, Seattle returned to the traditional all "Seahawks Blue" at home and all white on the road.

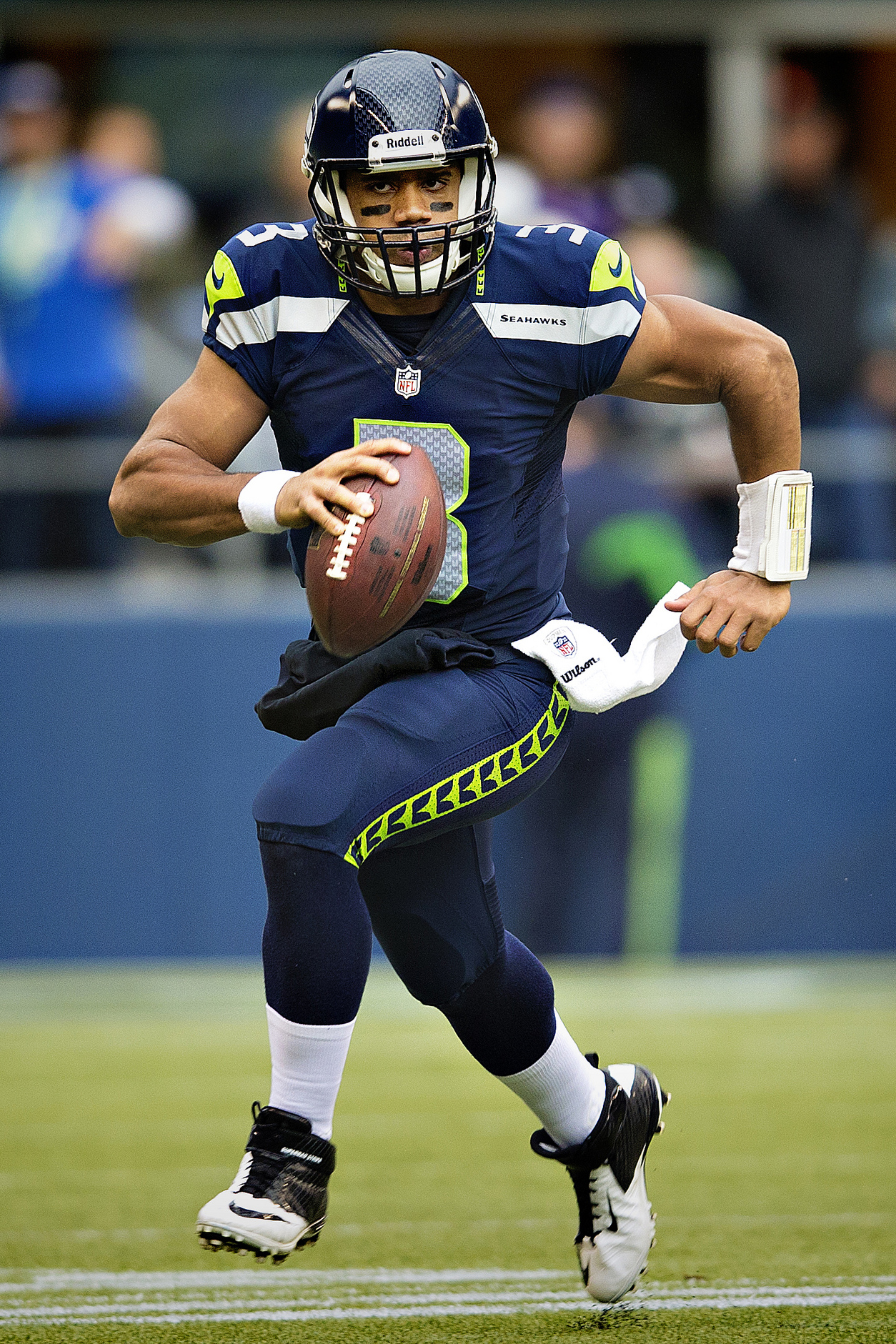
Russell Wilson wearing the current Seahawks home uniform.

On April 3, 2012, Nike, which took over as the official uniform supplier for the league from Reebok, unveiled new uniform and logo designs for the Seahawks for the 2012 season. The new designs incorporate a new accent color, "Wolf Grey", and the main colors are "College Navy" and "Action Green". The uniforms incorporate "feather trims", multiple feathers on the crown of the helmet, twelve feathers printed on the neckline and down each pant leg to represent the "12th Man", referring to the team's fans. The Seahawks have three different jersey colors: navy blue, white, and an alternate grey jersey. The Seahawks will have three different pants: navy blue with green feathers, gray with navy blue feathers, and white with navy blue feathers. Their new logo replaces the Seahawk blue with wolf grey. Altogether, there are nine different uniform combinations possible.

The Seahawks wore their Nike home blue jerseys for the first regular-season game on September 16, 2012, against the Dallas Cowboys. The uniform Marshawn Lynch wore in that game is preserved at the Pro Football Hall of Fame. On September 9, 2012, the Seahawks wore their Nike white away jerseys for the first regular-season game against the Arizona Cardinals; on October 14, 2012, with the Carolina Panthers wearing white at home, they wore their blue jerseys with gray pants (and would do so again against the Miami Dolphins seven weeks later); and on December 16, 2012, they wore their Alternate Wolf Grey jerseys for the first time against the Buffalo Bills.

The all-navy ensemble is the Seahawks' current primary uniform option for home games. Initially, the Seahawks paired their navy uniforms with gray pants on select road games in which the home team wore white jerseys, but on December 5, 2021, the Seahawks wore this combination at home for the first time in a game against the San Francisco 49ers. On the road, the Seahawks primarily pair their white uniforms with the navy pants (that combination was used during their Super Bowl XLVIII win), although they also pair the white uniforms with either white or gray pants on occasion. The all-gray uniforms were worn occasionally on the road, mainly against the Arizona Cardinals.

In 2016, the Seahawks unveiled their NFL Color Rush uniform, an all-Action Green ensemble. They first wore the uniform on December 16 against the Los Angeles Rams at home, marking the first time they wore green uniforms since 2009. The Seahawks continue to wear the Color Rush set as an alternate uniform alongside the all-gray combination.

During a home matchup with the Vikings on December 3, 2019, the Seahawks wore their Color Rush green tops and regular navy pants. The combination was used again on October 11, 2020, also against the Vikings, and then again on November 19, against the Arizona Cardinals. It was used once in 2021, on Thursday Night Football vs. the Rams.

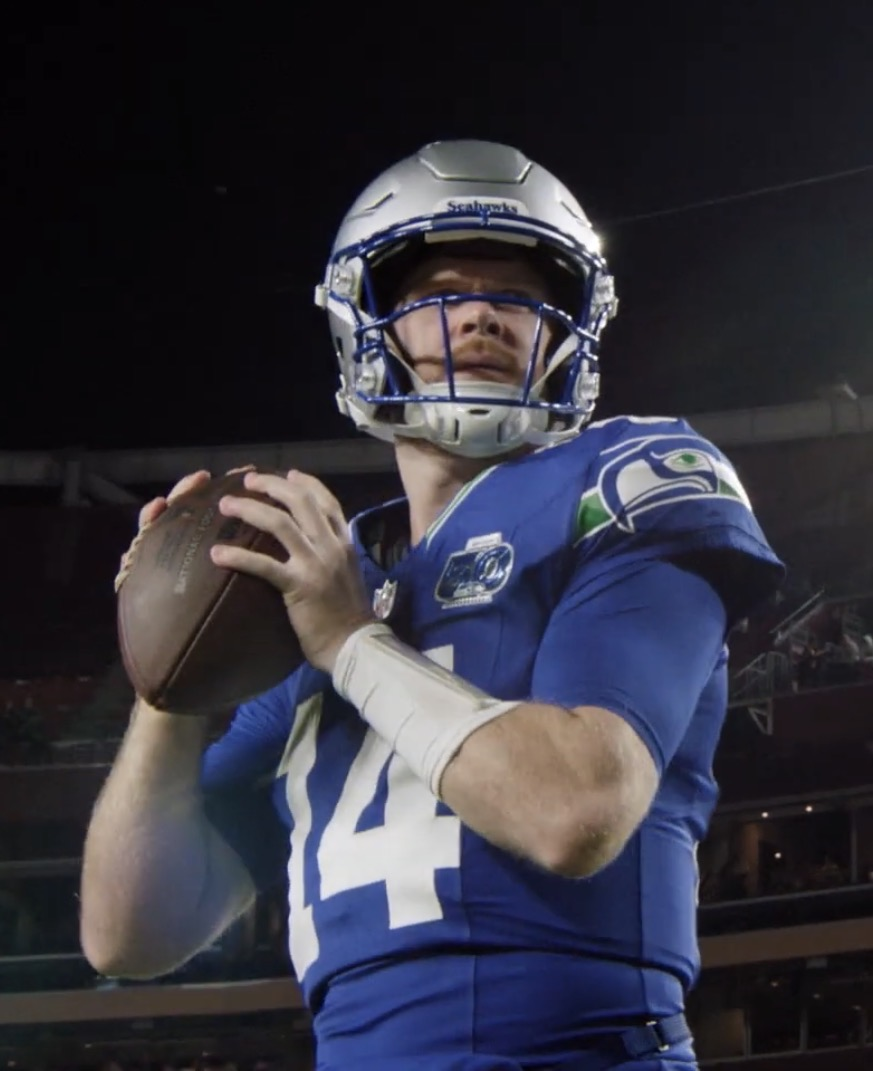
Sam Darnold wearing the throwback uniform during a game in 2025.

In July 2023, the Seahawks introduced a throwback uniform set inspired by the team's 1983–2001 design. These uniforms were worn in Week 8 against the Cleveland Browns. Consequently, the gray alternate tops were retired due to NFL regulations restricting teams to two alternate jerseys. A white version of the throwback uniform is set to be worn in 2027.

For a long time, the Seahawks were the only NFL team to have never worn white jerseys in a home game. That changed on September 24, 2023, when the team wore white jerseys at home against the Carolina Panthers. The game marked the 10th anniversary of the Seahawks' first Super Bowl victory, as the current team wore the same white jersey/navy pants combination from Super Bowl XLVIII.

During the 2025 NFL Draft, the NFL and Nike announced that the NFC WEST and AFC EAST would debut a "rivalry uniform" in the 2025 season that will be worn once a season against a division rival. The new fifth uniforms were intended to connect to the teams' cities, like the MLB's City Connect uniforms. On August 28, 2025, the new "High-Decibel Zone" Rivalries uniform was unveiled. In Wolf Grey and Iridescent Green, the design marks a return of the uniform color the team gave up in favor of the throwbacks the prior season. The green, a first of its kind in the NFL, features a metallic sheen that seems to change color depending on lighting and viewing angle.

The jersey features a unique iridescent green soundwave design on the upper chest and shoulders, as well as down the sides of the pants, meant to represent the notorious loudness of the fanbase at Lumen Field. Bordered in navy blue, the player numbers on the front and back are in the same green material with small repeating "12"s replacing the "feather" pattern of the standard uniform numbers. A green "12" patch is placed at the back of the collar. Navy blue stripes appear around the collar, at the bottoms of the sleeve cuffs, and down the sides of the pants. With wolf grey gloves, any additional items like tees, sleeves, and leg tights are in navy blue. The striking iridescent green helmet has a metallic chrome finish, making the color appear to alternate between green and blue in the light. The logo appears in white outline and the phrase "12 AS ONE" sits at the bottom of the back of the helmet.

== Rivalries ==
=== Divisional ===
==== Los Angeles Rams ====
The rivalry between the Seahawks and Los Angeles Rams came into existence in 2002 after the Seahawks moved to the NFC West. The first notable matchup between the two clubs occurred in the 2004 NFC Wild card round when the Rams managed to defeat the Seahawks in Seattle 27–20 and currently hold the streak for the only two wins against the Seahawks at home during the postseason. Much of the intensity waned as the Rams declined in competition throughout the 2000s and early 2010s, but several notable matchups between the two clubs would still occur. The rivalry saw new life as the Rams' Mob Squad-era teams regularly clashed with Seattle's Legion of Boom era teams, often escalating into bitter grudge matches for control of the division. After the Rams' return to Los Angeles in 2016, and subsequent playoff success (most recently with a Super Bowl victory in 2022); the rivalry has increased in intensity; especially as Seattle's Legion of Boom era teams waned in competition. Due to the recent dominance by the Rams under Sean McVay and former defensive tackle Aaron Donald, Seahawks fans have recently viewed the Rams as their divisional arch rival. Tensions especially ran high during the 2021 Wild Card game after a widely publicized taunt from Safety Jamal Adams during a postgame conference after a tough win over the Rams during week 16. The Rams would go onto defeat the Seahawks in the wild card game, with cornerback Jalen Ramsey and quarterback Jared Goff expressing their satisfaction to get retribution after Adams' comments and cigar gesture.

Through the 2025 season, the Seahawks lead the series 30–28. The Rams have won two of the three playoff meetings, with the most recent playoff matchup won by the Seahawks.

==== San Francisco 49ers ====
From 2011 to 2014, the Seahawks and the San Francisco 49ers emerged as two of the best teams in the NFC, and developed a rivalry as a result. The 49ers head coach at the time, Jim Harbaugh, had a contentious history with Seahawks coach Pete Carroll due to Harbaugh's previous job as coach at Stanford against Carroll's USC Trojans. Harbaugh's 49ers won the first three head-to-head contests but lost Week 16 of 2012. Both teams reached the playoffs that year, however the 49ers reached Super Bowl XLVII, which they lost. In 2013, the Seahawks won in a Week 2 contest, but the 49ers would triumph in Week 14. The Seahawks would beat the 49ers in the 2013 season NFC Championship Game 23–17. The Seahawks went on to win the next 10 matchups, sweeping the regular season series against the 49ers from 2014 to 2018. After splitting games in 2018 and 2019, the 49ers won 6 straight against the Seahawks, including the 2022 wild card game. The Seahawks won the second matchup of 2024 to end the streak. In 2025, the two teams met in week 18 to determine the winner of the NFC West and the #1 seed in the NFC; the Seahawks won 13–3 and cost San Francisco an opportunity to never leave home since Super Bowl LX was played in San Francisco. Two weeks later, the 49ers travelled to Seattle for the Divisional Round match-up and were decisively defeated 41–6.

As of the end of the 2025 season, the Seahawks lead the series 33–24.

==== Arizona Cardinals ====
The Arizona Cardinals and Seahawks became divisional rivals after both were moved to the NFC West during the league's 2002 realignment. This rivalry has become one of the NFL's more bitter in recent years, as the mid-to-late 2010s often saw the Seahawks and Cardinals square off for NFC West supremacy. The rivalry hit its peak as the Cardinals led by quarterback Carson Palmer and head coach Bruce Arians frequently clashed with the Legion Of Boom-era Seahawks led by Russell Wilson and head coach Pete Carroll, although Seattle shares more intense rivalries with the Rams and 49ers. Despite this, the two teams have been known to beat each other on their respective home fields, with Seattle having more wins against the Cardinals in Arizona than Seattle, and vice versa. Seattle leads the series 31–22–1, and the two teams have yet to meet in the playoffs.

=== Conference ===
==== Green Bay Packers ====
Since moving to the NFC, the Seahawks have faced the Green Bay Packers several times in the playoffs, developing an intense rivalry as well. Some notable moments include the clubs' first playoff meeting in 2003 in which Seahawks quarterback Matt Hasselbeck threw a game-losing pick-six in overtime after guaranteeing a game-winning drive, the Fail Mary, and Russell Wilson overcoming four interceptions and a 16–0 Packers lead to lead Seattle to a 28–22 overtime win in the 2014 NFC Championship Game to advance to Super Bowl XLIX. As of the 2024 season, the Packers lead the all-time series 16–9.

=== Historic ===
==== Denver Broncos ====
From the 1980s to the 2002 league realignment, the Denver Broncos were a major rival for the Seahawks. As of the 2023 season, the Broncos lead 35–23 against the Seahawks with Seattle having won both postseason meetings. Since 2002, Denver has won three of five interconference meetings, and the teams met in Super Bowl XLVIII on February 2, 2014, where the Seahawks won 43–8. On March 8, 2022, the Seattle Seahawks agreed to trade Russell Wilson and a 2022 fourth-round pick to the Denver Broncos for quarterback Drew Lock, tight end Noah Fant, defensive lineman Shelby Harris, two first-round picks (2022—No. 9 overall—and 2023), two second-round picks (2022—No. 40 overall—and 2023) and a 2022 fifth-round selection. Russell Wilson's first game against the Seattle Seahawks as a member of the Denver Broncos was played September 12, 2022, on Monday Night Football, where the Seahawks won 17–16.

==== Las Vegas Raiders ====
The Raiders and Seahawks played many times being old members of the AFC West. Seattle's move to the NFC has made the matchup occur much less frequently, playing only five times since the end of the 2002 season. The Raiders lead the all-time series 30–26.

== Headquarters and training camps ==
During the Seahawks' first ten seasons (1976–85), the team's headquarters was in Kirkland at the southern end of the Lake Washington Shipyard (now Carillon Point), on the shores of Lake Washington. The summer training camps were held across the state at Eastern Washington University in Cheney, southwest of Spokane.

When the team's new headquarters across town in Kirkland was completed in 1986, the Seahawks held training camp at home for the next eleven seasons (1986–96), staying in the dormitories of the adjacent Northwest College. In 1997, Dennis Erickson's third season as head coach, the team returned to the hotter and more isolated Cheney for training camp, which continued through 2006. In 2007, training camp returned to the Seahawk's Kirkland facility because of the scheduled China Bowl (NFL) game, which was later canceled. In 2008, the Seahawks held the first three weeks of camp in Kirkland, then moved to the new 19-acre (7.7 ha) Virginia Mason Athletic Center (VMAC) on August 18 for the final week of training camp, where the team has held their training camps since. Located on the southeastern shore of Lake Washington in Renton, the VMAC has four full-size practice fields: three natural grass outdoors and one FieldTurf indoors.

== Seasons and overall records ==
The Seattle Seahawks have competed in 50 NFL seasons, dating back to their expansion year of 1976. The team has compiled a 402–373–1 (.519) regular-season record and a 17–19 (.472) record in the playoffs, for an overall record of 419–392–1 and a .517 winning percentage. Seattle has reached the playoffs in 21 separate seasons, including in the 2005 season when they lost Super Bowl XL to the Pittsburgh Steelers 21–10, the 2013 season when they defeated the Denver Broncos 43–8 to win Super Bowl XLVIII, the 2014 season when they lost Super Bowl XLIX to the New England Patriots 28–24, and the 2025 season, this time beating the Patriots 29–13 in Super Bowl LX. In the 2010 season, the Seahawks became the first team in NFL history to earn a spot in the playoffs with a losing record (7–9, .438) in a full season; this was by winning the division. The Seahawks would go on to defeat the reigning Super Bowl champion New Orleans Saints in the Wild Card round, becoming the first team ever to win a playoff game with a losing record. Until Week 7 of the 2016 season against the Arizona Cardinals, the Seahawks had never recorded a tied game in their history.

== Players ==
=== Current roster ===
Seattle Seahawks roster
**Quarterbacks (QB)**: 14 Sam Darnold; 2 Drew Lock; 6 Jalen Milroe; **Running backs (RB)**: 26 Zach Charbonnet; 36 George Holani; 8 Jadarian Price; 38 Brady Russell FB; 23 Emanuel Wilson; **Wide receivers (WR)**: 85 Irvin Charles; 15 Tory Horton; 10 Cooper Kupp; 22 Rashid Shaheed RS; 11 Jaxon Smith-Njigba; **Tight ends (TE)**: 88 AJ Barner; 89 Nick Kallerup; 81 Eric Saubert	**Offensive linemen (OL)**: 75 Anthony Bradford G; 67 Charles Cross T; 74 Josh Jones G/T; 72 Abraham Lucas T; 53 Quenton Nelson G; 55 Olu Oluwatimi C; 70 Beau Stephens G; 61 Jalen Sundell C; 76 Grey Zabel G; **Defensive linemen (DL)**: 98 Rylie Mills DE; 94 Mike Morris DE; 91 Byron Murphy II DT; 95 Brandon Pili NT; 90 Jarran Reed NT; 99 Leonard Williams DT	**Linebackers (LB)**: 56 Dante Fowler OLB; 58 Derick Hall OLB; 13 Ernest Jones ILB; 48 Tyrice Knight OLB; 0 DeMarcus Lawrence OLB; 7 Uchenna Nwosu OLB; 52 Patrick O'Connell ILB; 57 Connor O'Toole OLB; 44 Chazz Surratt OLB; 32 Drake Thomas OLB; **Defensive backs (DB)**: 3 Nick Emmanwori S; 29 Josh Jobe CB; 20 Julian Love S; 39 Ty Okada S; 28 Nehemiah Pritchett CB; 27 Avery Smith CB; 24 Rodney Thomas II S; 21 Devon Witherspoon CB; **Special teams (ST)**: 4 Michael Dickson P; 5 Jason Myers K; 41 Chris Stoll LS	**Practice squad**: 69 Cole Brevard DT; 73 Logan Brown T; 37 Michael Dansby CB; 16 Trevon Diggs CB; 97 Deven Eastern NT; 87 Montorie Foster WR; 35 Andre Fuller CB; 68 Bobby Hart T; 84 Emmanuel Henderson WR; 42 Maxen Hook S; 93 Aidan Hubbard LB; 33 Velus Jones Jr. RB; 62 Federico Maranges C (IPP); 50 Jamie Sheriff LB; 49 Ben Sims TE; 66 Cordell Volson G; 86 Ricky White WR; **Reserve**: 17 Terrion Arnold CB (Exempt); 18 Elijah Arroyo TE (IR); 19 Jake Bobo WR (IR); 9 Bud Clark S (IR); 1 Julian Neal CB (IR); 40 Robbie Ouzts FB (IR); 78 Mason Richman T/G (IR); 31 Jacardia Wright RB (PS/I) 52 active, 16 practice squad (1 IPP), 8 reserve As of November 17, 2026. Rookies in italics.; Roster; Depth chart; Transactions

=== 35th Anniversary Team (2010) ===
The 35th Anniversary team was voted upon by users on Seahawks.com and announced in 2010. Bold indicates those elected to the Pro Football Hall of Fame.

Seattle Seahawks 35th Anniversary Team (2010)
Unit	Position	Players
Offense	Quarterback	Matt Hasselbeck (QB) 2001–2010
Offense	Running back	Shaun Alexander (RB) 2000–2007; Mack Strong (FB) 1993–2007
Offense	Wide receiver	**Steve Largent** (WR) 1976–1989; Brian Blades (WR) 1988–1998; Bobby Engram (WR) 2001–2008
Offense	Tight end	John Carlson (TE) 2008–2011
Offense	Offensive line	**Walter Jones** (T) 1997–2010; Howard Ballard (T) 1994–1998; **Steve Hutchinson** (G) 2001–2005; Bryan Millard (G) 1984–1991; Robbie Tobeck (C) 2000–2006
Defense	Defensive line	Jacob Green (DE) 1980–1992; Michael Sinclair (DE) 1991–2001; **Cortez Kennedy** (DT) 1990–2000; Joe Nash (DT) 1982–1996
Defense	Linebacker	Chad Brown (OLB) 1997–2004; Rufus Porter (OLB) 1988–1994; Fredd Young (ILB) 1984–1987; Lofa Tatupu (MLB) 2005–2010
Defense	Cornerback	Marcus Trufant (CB) 2003–2012; Dave Brown (CB) 1976–1986; Shawn Springs (NB) 1997–2003
Defense	Safety	**Kenny Easley** (SS) 1981–1987; Eugene Robinson (FS) 1985–1995
Special teams	Kicker/Punter	Norm Johnson (K) 1982–1990; Rick Tuten (P) 1991–1997
Special teams	Returner	Steve Broussard (KR) 1995–1998; Nate Burleson (PR) 2006–2009
Special teams	Coverage	Rufus Porter 1988–1994

=== Top 50 Players (2025) ===
To celebrate the 50th season of the Seattle Seahawks, a list of the top 50 players in franchise history was announced in 2025. The list was voted on by fans, media members and internal stakeholders towards the end of the 2024 season. Over 160 players were eligible based on the following criteria:

- Started at least 45 games
- Voted to an AP All-Pro or NFL Pro Bowl team roster
- Won Seahawks Man of the Year or the Steve Largent Award
- Currently leads a career major statistical category, such as most receiving yards in a career
- Part of an iconic moment in Seahawks history

Bold indicates those elected to the Pro Football Hall of Fame.

Seattle Seahawks Top 50 players (2025)
No.	Player	Position	Tenure	No.	Player	Position	Tenure
37	Shaun Alexander	RB	2000–2007	24	Marshawn Lynch	RB	2010–2015, 2019
56	Cliff Avril	DE	2013–2017	92	Brandon Mebane	DT	2005–2016
65	Edwin Bailey	G	1981–1991	14	DK Metcalf	WR	2019–2024
89	Doug Baldwin	WR	2011–2018	71	Bryan Millard	G	1984–1992
72	Michael Bennett	DE	2013–2017	72	Joe Nash	DT	1992–2001
89	Brian Blades	WR	1988–1998	97	Rufus Porter	LB	1988–1994
94	Chad Brown	LB	1997–2004	41	Eugene Robinson	FS	1985–1995
22	Dave Brown	CB	1976–1986	9	Jon Ryan	P	2008–2017
77	Jeff Bryant	DE	1982–1993	25	Richard Sherman	CB	2011–2017
53	Keith Butler	LB	1978–1987	70	Michael Sinclair	DE	1991–2001
31	Kam Chancellor	SS	2010–2018	38	Mack Strong	FB	1993–2007
4	Michael Dickson	P	2018–present	51	Lofa Tatupu	LB	2005–2010
45	**Kenny Easley**	SS	1981–1987	29	Earl Thomas	FS	2010–2018
84	Bobby Engram	WR	2001–2008	61	Robbie Tobeck	C	2000–2006
62	Chris Gray	G	1995–2007	23	Marcus Trufant	CB	2003–2012
79	Jacob Green	DE	1980–1991	60	Max Unger	C	2009–2014
44	John Harris	FS	1978–1985	54	Bobby Wagner	LB	2012–2021, 2023
8	Matt Hasselbeck	QB	2001–2010	28	Curt Warner	RB	1983–1989
76	**Steve Hutchinson**	G	2001–2005	42	Chris Warren	RB	1990–1997
82	Darrell Jackson	WR	2000–2006	32	John L. Williams	FB	1986–1993
71	**Walter Jones**	OT	1997–2008	3	Russell Wilson	QB	2012–2021
96	**Cortez Kennedy**	DT	1990–2000	21	Devon Witherspoon	CB	2023–present
17	Dave Krieg	QB	1980–1991	50	K.J. Wright	LB	2011–2020
80	**Steve Largent**	WR	1976–1989	50	Fredd Young	LB	1984–1987
16	Tyler Lockett	WR	2015–2024	10	Jim Zorn	QB	1976–1984

=== Retired numbers ===
The Seahawks have retired five numbers in franchise history.

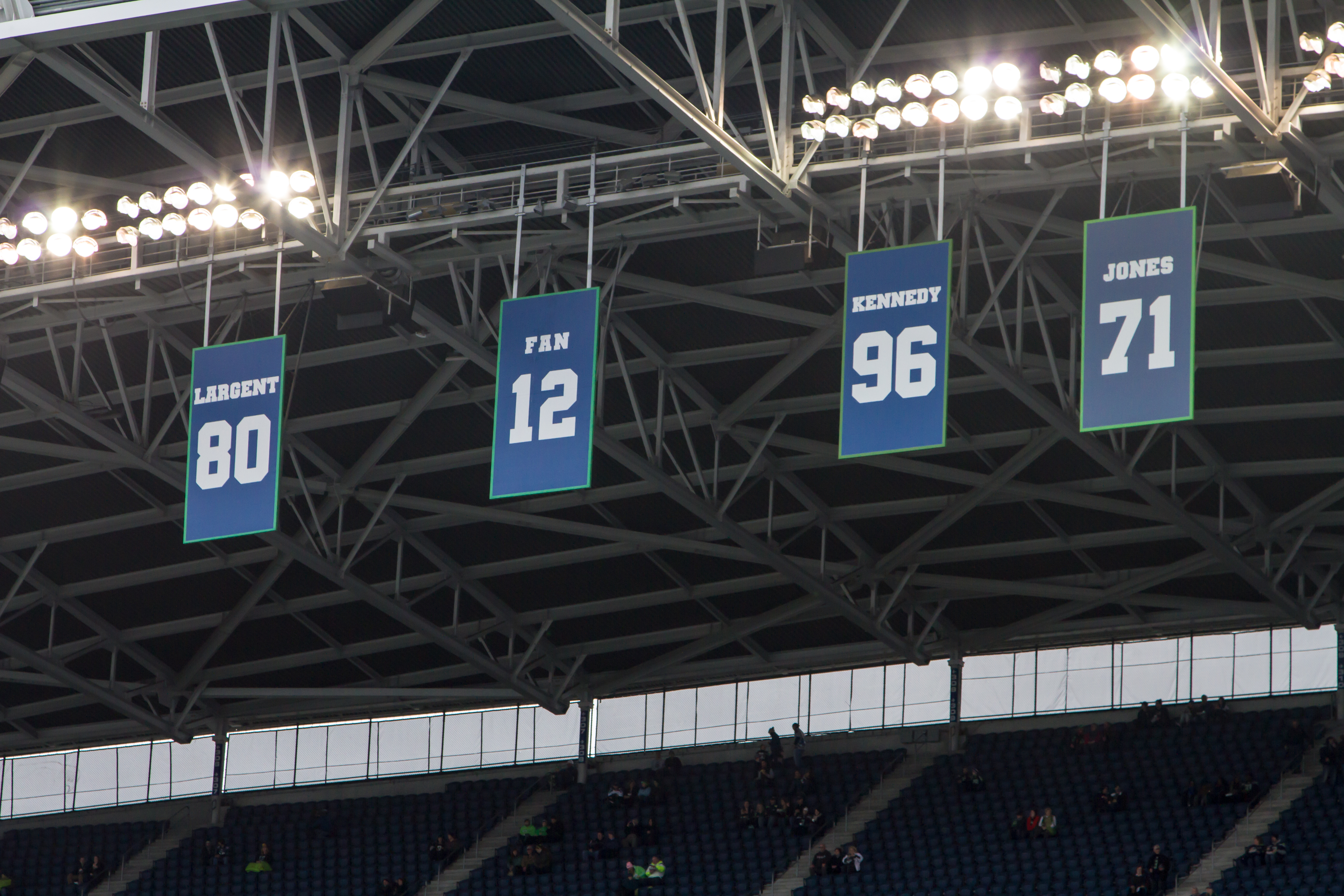
Seahawks' retired numbers at Lumen Field.

**Seattle Seahawks retired numbers**
No.	Player	Position	Tenure	Retired	Ref.
**12**	12th man	FAN	1976–present	December 15, 1984	
**45**	Kenny Easley	SS	1981–1987	October 1, 2017	
**71**	Walter Jones	OT	1997–2009	December 5, 2010	
**80** †	Steve Largent	WR	1976–1989	1992	
**96**	Cortez Kennedy	DT	1990–2000	October 14, 2012	

- † Jerry Rice wore No. 80 for his 2004 stint with the Seahawks. According to Rice, the team offered him the jersey number, with Largent's permission.
- Several other players and individuals related to the team have been honored by their induction into the Seattle Seahawks Ring of Honor

=== Pro Football Hall of Famers ===
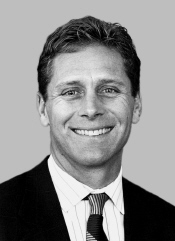
Hall of Fame WR Steve Largent (1976–1989)

**Seattle Seahawks Pro Football Hall of Famers**
Players
No.	Name	Position	Tenure	Inducted
**34**	Franco Harris	FB	1984	1990
**80**	**Steve Largent**	WR	1976–1989	1995
**81**	Carl Eller	DE	1979	2004
**1**	Warren Moon	QB	1997–1998	2006
**93**	John Randle	DT	2001–2003	2010
**80**	Jerry Rice	WR	2004	2010
**96**	**Cortez Kennedy**	DT	1990–2000	2012
**71**	**Walter Jones**	OT	1997–2009	2014
**45**	**Kenny Easley**	SS	1981–1987	2017
**52**	Kevin Mawae	C	1994–1997	2019
**76**	Steve Hutchinson	G	2001–2005	2020
**17**	Devin Hester	RS	2016	2024
**93**	Dwight Freeney	DE	2017	2024
Coaches and Executives
Name		Position	Tenure	Inducted
Tom Flores		Head coach	1992–1994	2021
Names in **bold** spent their entire career with the Seattle Seahawks

Note: Although Mike McCormack served as head coach, president, and general manager for the Seahawks, he is only listed in the Pro Football Hall of Fame for his contributions as a tackle for the New York Yanks and the Cleveland Browns.

== Ownership and personnel ==
=== Team owners ===
- Nordstrom estate & Herman Sarkowsky: 1976–1988
- Ken Behring & Ken Hofmann: 1988–1996
- Paul Allen: 1997–2018
- Allen estate, managed by Jody Allen: 2018–2026
- Neeru Khosla: 2026–present
  - Co-owners: Vinod Khosla (chair), Neal Khosla (vice chair), Mark Stevens, the Aramburuzabala Family, Val Blavatnik, Sheryl Sokoloff, Gonzalo Hevia Baillères, Jesse van der Werf, Samir Kaul, Sunny Gupta, Nader Naini, Penny Pritzker, The Carlyle Group and Dynasty Equity, Sixth Street Partners

=== Current staff ===
Seattle Seahawks staff
Front office: Controlling owner – Neeru Khosla; Chair – Vinod Khosla; Vice chair – Neal Khosla; Co-owners – Mark Stevens, Penny Pritzker, Aramburuzabala Family; President – Chuck Arnold; President of football operations/general manager – John Schneider; Vice president of football administration – Joey Laine; Vice president of football finance – William Saguilla; Assistant general manager – Matt Berry; Assistant general manager – Willie Schneider; Director of player personnel – Aaron Hineline; Director of college scouting – Jason Barnes; Director of pro personnel – Armani Perez; Director of football analysis and special situations – Brian Eayrs; VP of research & analytics – Patrick Ward; Head coaches: Head coach – Mike Macdonald; Assistant head coach – Leslie Frazier; Offensive coaches: Offensive coordinator – Brian Fleury; Passing game coordinator/quarterbacks – Jake Peetz; Run game coordinator – Justin Outten; Quarterbacks – Tyson Prince; Senior offensive assistant/running backs – Thomas Hammock; Wide receivers – Frisman Jackson; Tight ends – Mack Brown; Assistant tight ends – Michael Byrne; Senior offensive assistant/offensive line – John Benton; Assistant offensive line – Quinshon Odom; Pass game strategist – Daniel Stern; Offensive assistant – Jimmie Dougherty; Offensive assistant – Johnathan Williams	Defensive coaches: Defensive coordinator – Aden Durde; Defensive run game coordinator – Chris Partridge; Defensive line – Justin Hinds; Outside linebackers – Josh Bynes; Inside linebackers – Zach Orr; Passing game coordinator/defensive backs – Karl Scott; Safeties – Jeff Howard; Senior defensive assistant – Kirk Olivadotti; Defensive assistant/defensive backs – Neiko Thorpe; Defensive assistant – Rob Caprice; Defensive quality control – Keller Chryst; Special teams coaches: Special teams coordinator – Jay Harbaugh; Assistant special teams – Devin Fitzsimmons; Strength and conditioning: Director of player performance and development – Ivan Lewis; Head strength coach – Danny Van Dijk; Associate head strength coach – Mark Philipp; Strength & conditioning assistant – Thomas Garcia; Strength & conditioning assistant – Tim Ojeda; Strength & conditioning assistant – Jamie Yanchar; → Coaching staff → Front office → More NFL staffs

=== Previous head coaches ===
The Seahawks have had nine head coaches in franchise history.

== Team culture ==
The Seahawks are the only NFL team in the Northwestern United States and have a fanbase that stretches as far east as Montana and as far north as Alaska. As of 2026, the team has over 4,000 season ticket holders with a home address in the Canadian province of British Columbia.

=== 12s ===
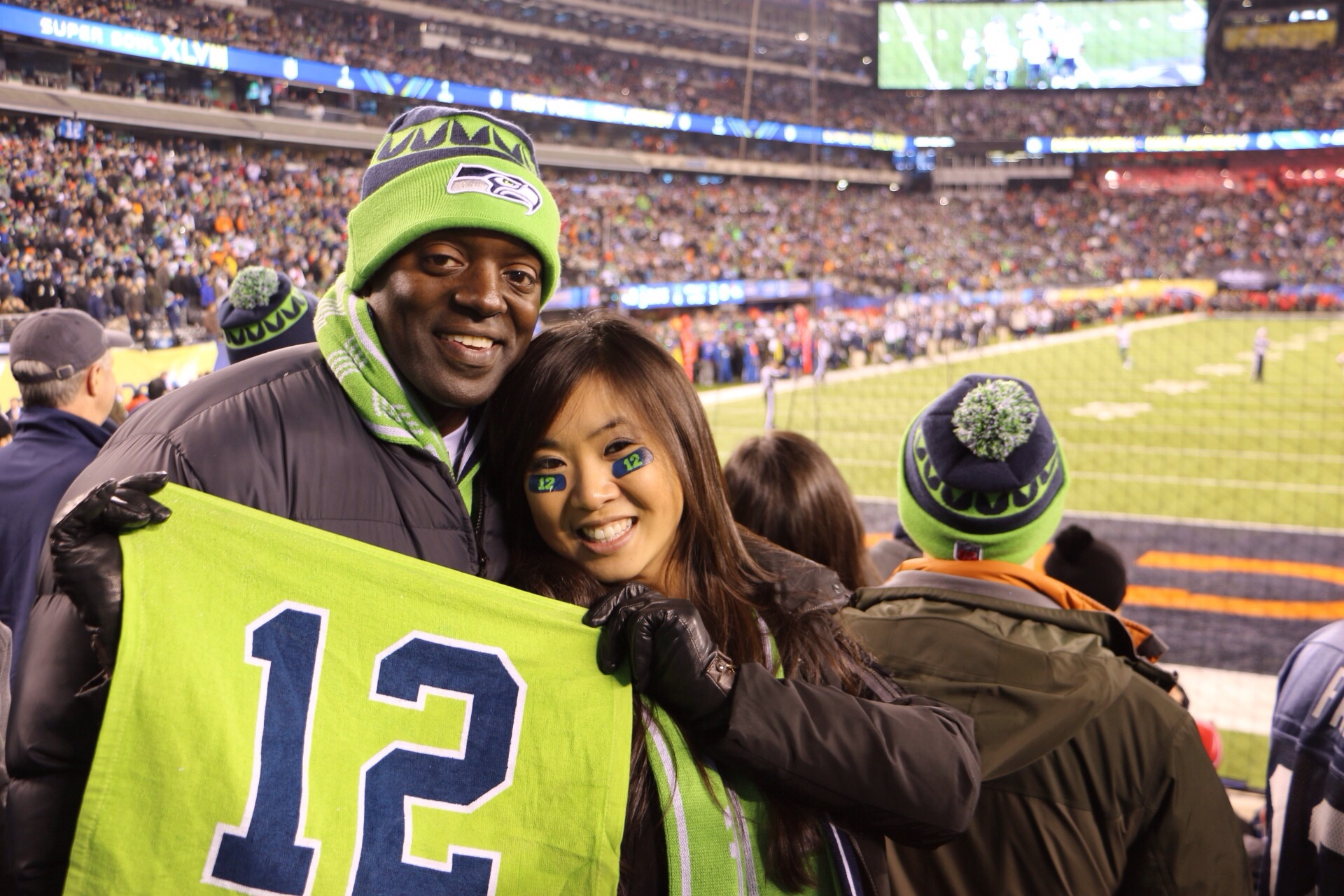
Seahawks fans holding a "12" flag at Super Bowl XLVIII

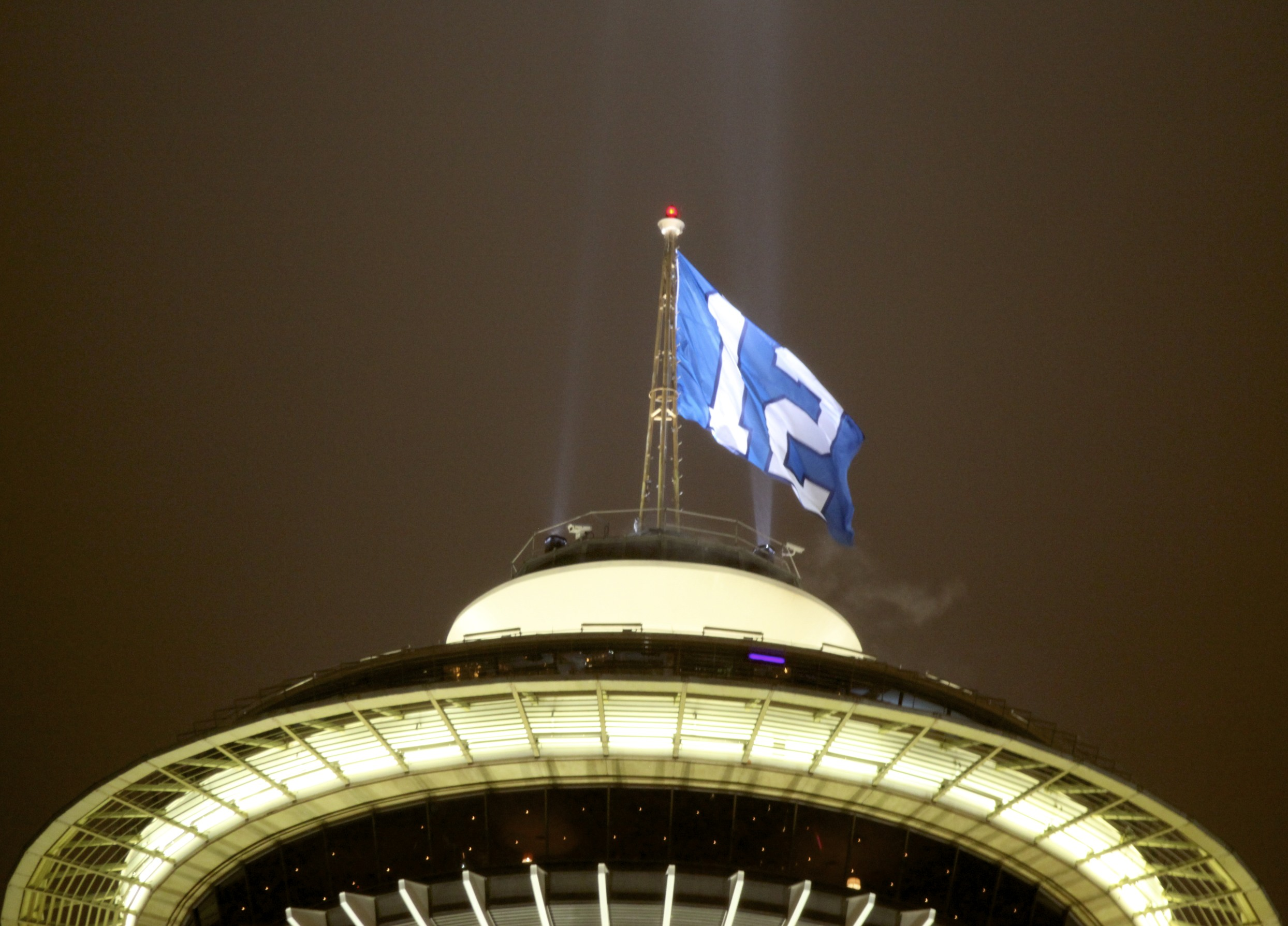
A "12" flag raised at Seattle's Space Needle

The 12s (formerly the 12th man) refers to the fan support of the Seahawks. The team's first home stadium, the Kingdome, was one of the loudest and most disruptive environments in the NFL. Opponents were known to practice with rock music blaring at full blast to prepare for the often painfully high-decibel levels generated at games in the Kingdome.

In 2002, the Seahawks began playing at what is now Lumen Field. Every regular-season and playoff game at Lumen Field since the second week of the 2003 season has been played before a sellout crowd. Like the Kingdome before it, Lumen Field is one of the loudest stadiums in the league. The stadium's partial roof and seating decks trap and amplify the noise and reflect it back down to the field. This noise has caused problems for opposing teams. From 2002 through 2012, there were 143 false-start penalties on visiting teams in Seattle, second only to the Minnesota Vikings.

The Seahawks' fans have twice set the Guinness World Record for the loudest crowd noise at a sporting event, first on September 15, 2013, registering 136.6 dB during a game against the San Francisco 49ers and again on December 2, 2013, during a Monday Night Football game against the New Orleans Saints, with a roar of 137.6 dB. As of September 29, 2014, the record of 142.2 dB is held in Arrowhead Stadium by fans of the Kansas City Chiefs.

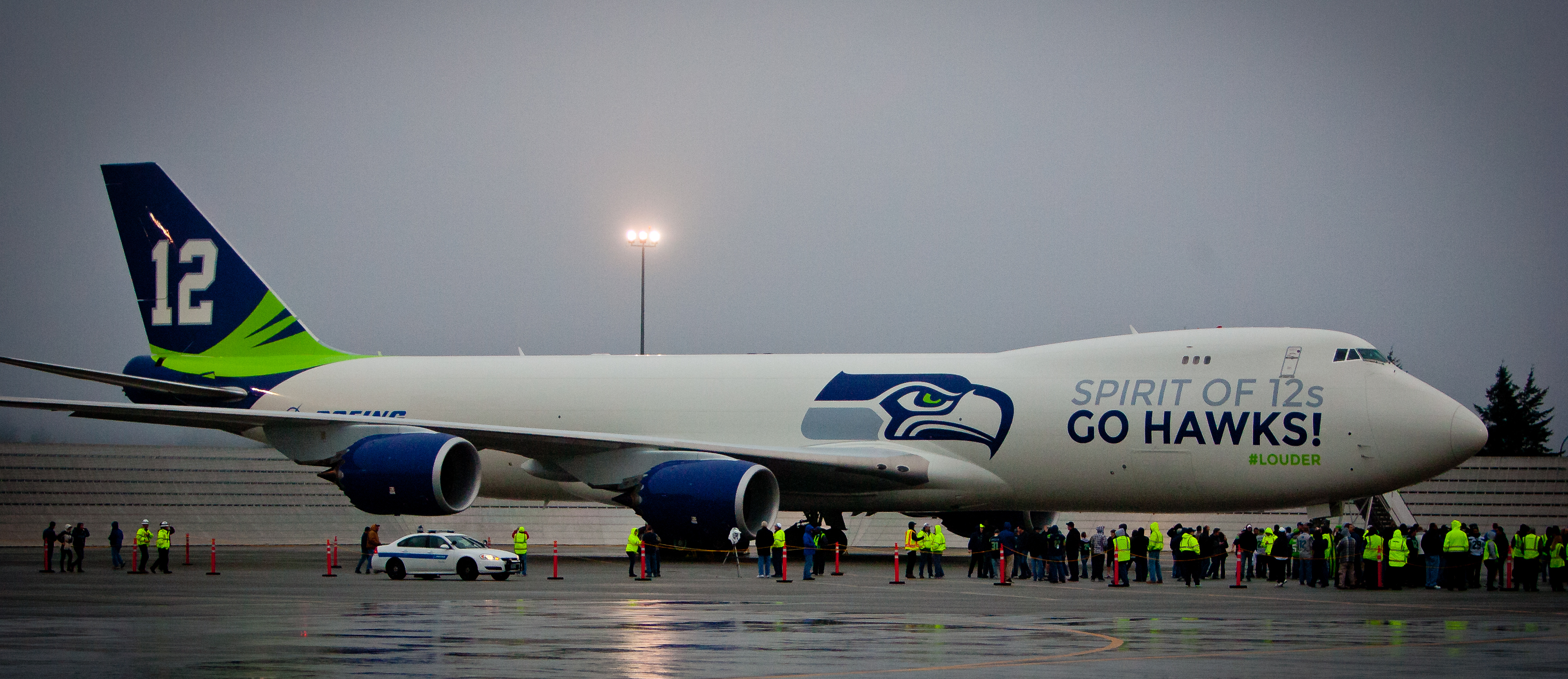
A Boeing 747-8F painted in 12th man livery for the team's Super Bowl appearance.

Before kickoff of each home game, the Seahawks salute their fans by raising a giant #12 flag at the south end of the stadium. Current and former players, coaches, local celebrities, prominent fans including Patti Hammond, Seattle-area athletes, and former owner Paul Allen have raised the flag. Earlier, the Seahawks retired the #12 jersey on December 15, 1984, as a tribute to their fans. Before their Super Bowl win, the Seahawks ran onto the field under a giant 12th Man flag.

In September 1990, Texas A&M University filed, and was later granted, a trademark application for the "12th Man" term, based on their continual usage of the term since the 1920s. In January 2006, Texas A&M filed suit against the Seattle Seahawks to protect the trademark and in May 2006, the dispute was settled out of court. In the agreement, which expired in 2016, Texas A&M licensed the Seahawks to continue using the phrase, in exchange for a licensing fee, public acknowledgement of A&M's trademark when using the term, a restriction in usage of the term to seven states in the Northwest United States, and a prohibition from selling any "12th Man" merchandise. Once the agreement expired, the Seahawks were allowed to continue using the number "12" but were no longer permitted to use the "12th Man" phrase. In August 2015, the Seahawks decided to drop their signage of the "12th Man" term and shifted towards referring to their fans as the "12s" instead.

=== Mascots ===
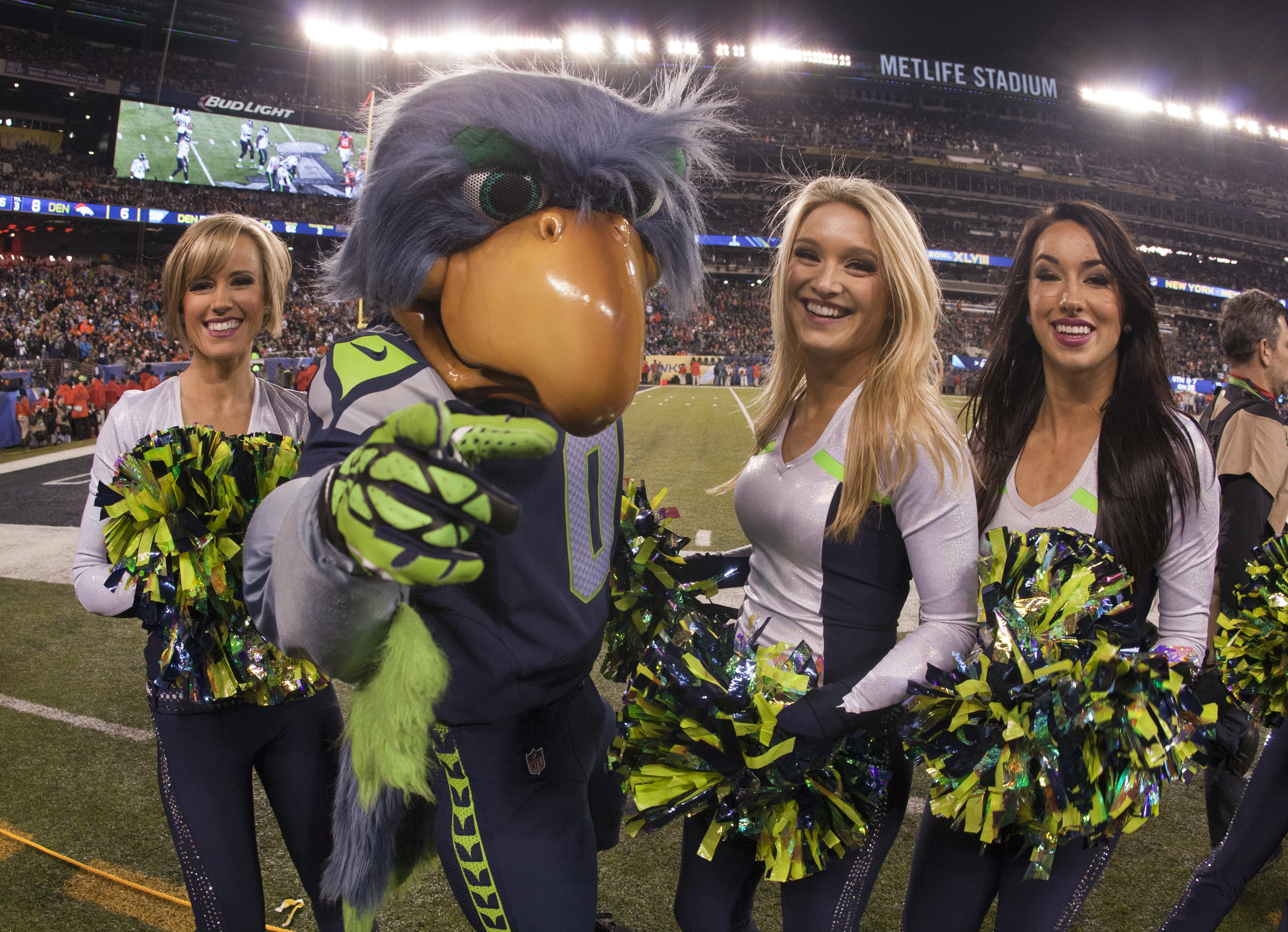
Blitz (original look) and Sea Gals at Super Bowl XLVIII

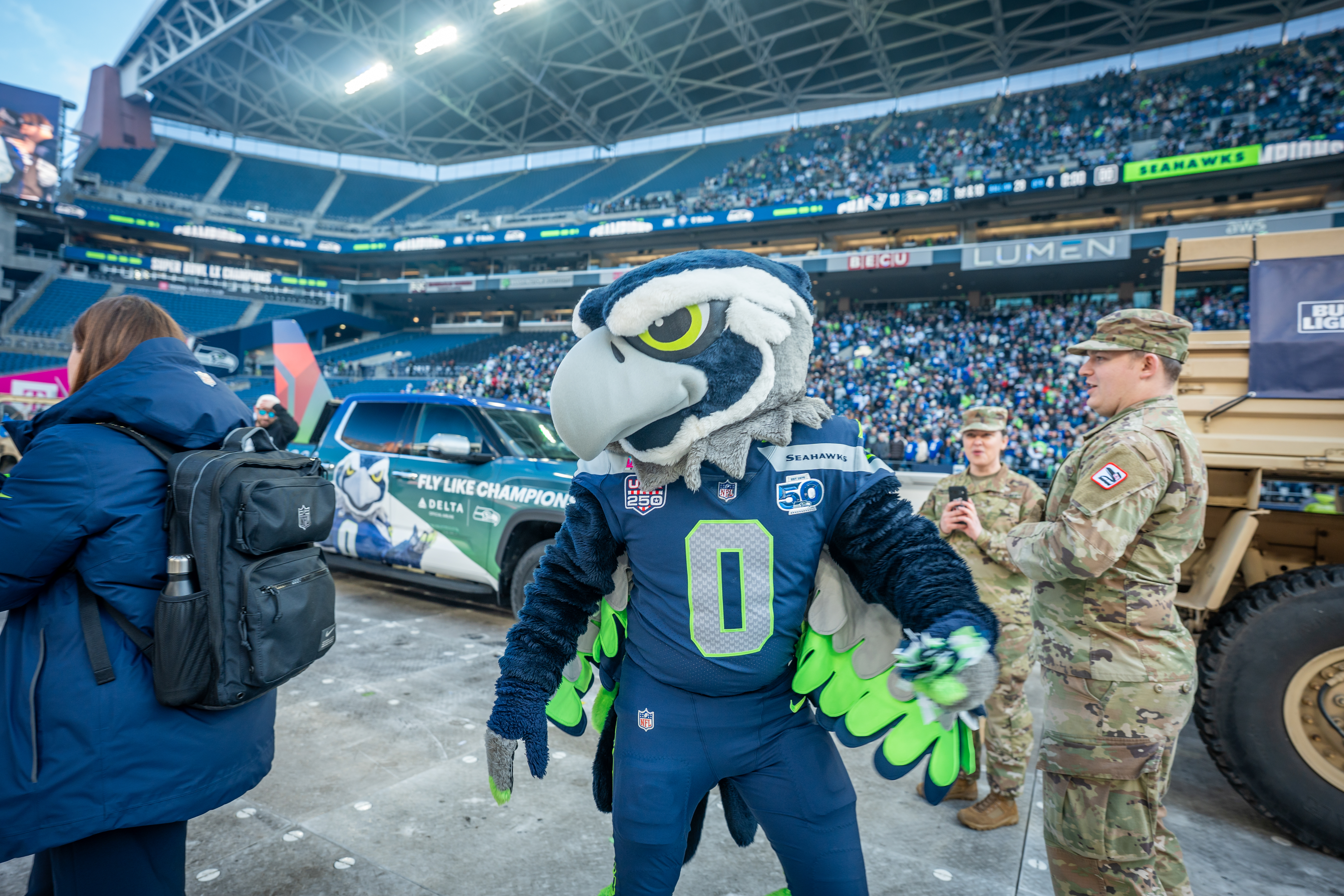
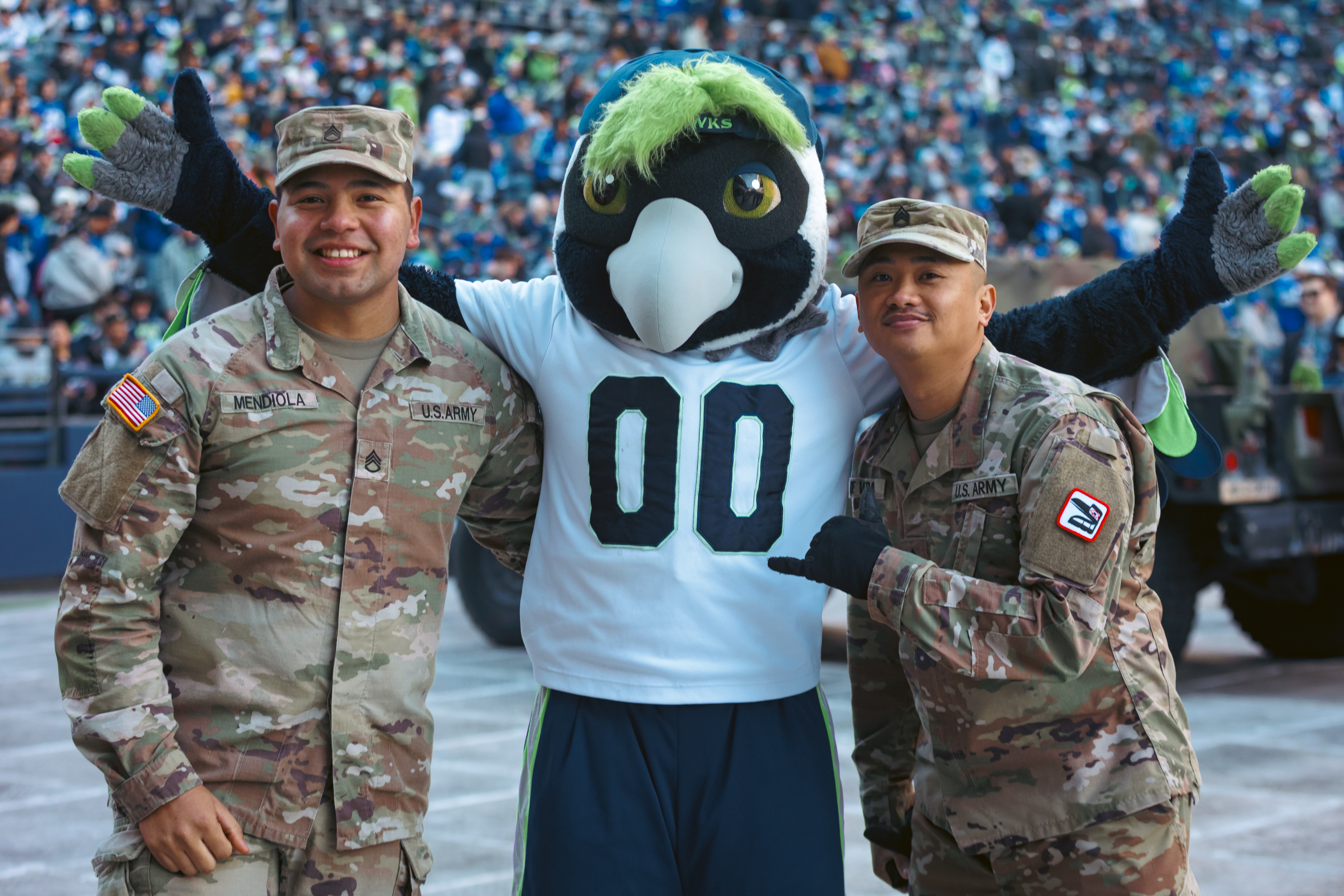
Seattle Seahawks' two mascots, Blitz (top; updated look) and Boom (bottom)

Starting in the 1998 season, Blitz has been the Seahawks' official mascot. Before the 2014 NFL season, Blitz was given a new look and a sidekick; a secondary mascot named Boom was introduced to appeal to and interact with younger children.

In the 2003 and 2004 seasons, a hawk named Faith would fly around the stadium just before the team came out of the tunnel. However, because of her relatively small size and an inability to be trained to lead the team out of the tunnel, Faith was replaced by an augur hawk named Taima before the start of the 2005 NFL season. Taima started leading the team out of the tunnel in September 2006.

=== Cheerleaders ===
A group of female and male cheerleaders known as the Seahawks Dancers rallies the crowd from the sidelines and performs a halftime routine during home games at Lumen Field. The group was an all-female squad called the Sea Gals until it admitted male members and was renamed before the 2019 NFL season. During the off-season, a unit of the Dancers travels to parades and other events, as well as with other NFL cheerleaders on the road.

=== Band ===
Beginning in 2004, the Seahawks introduced their drum line, the Blue Thunder. The group plays at every home game and at other Seattle events.

== Franchise records and achievements ==
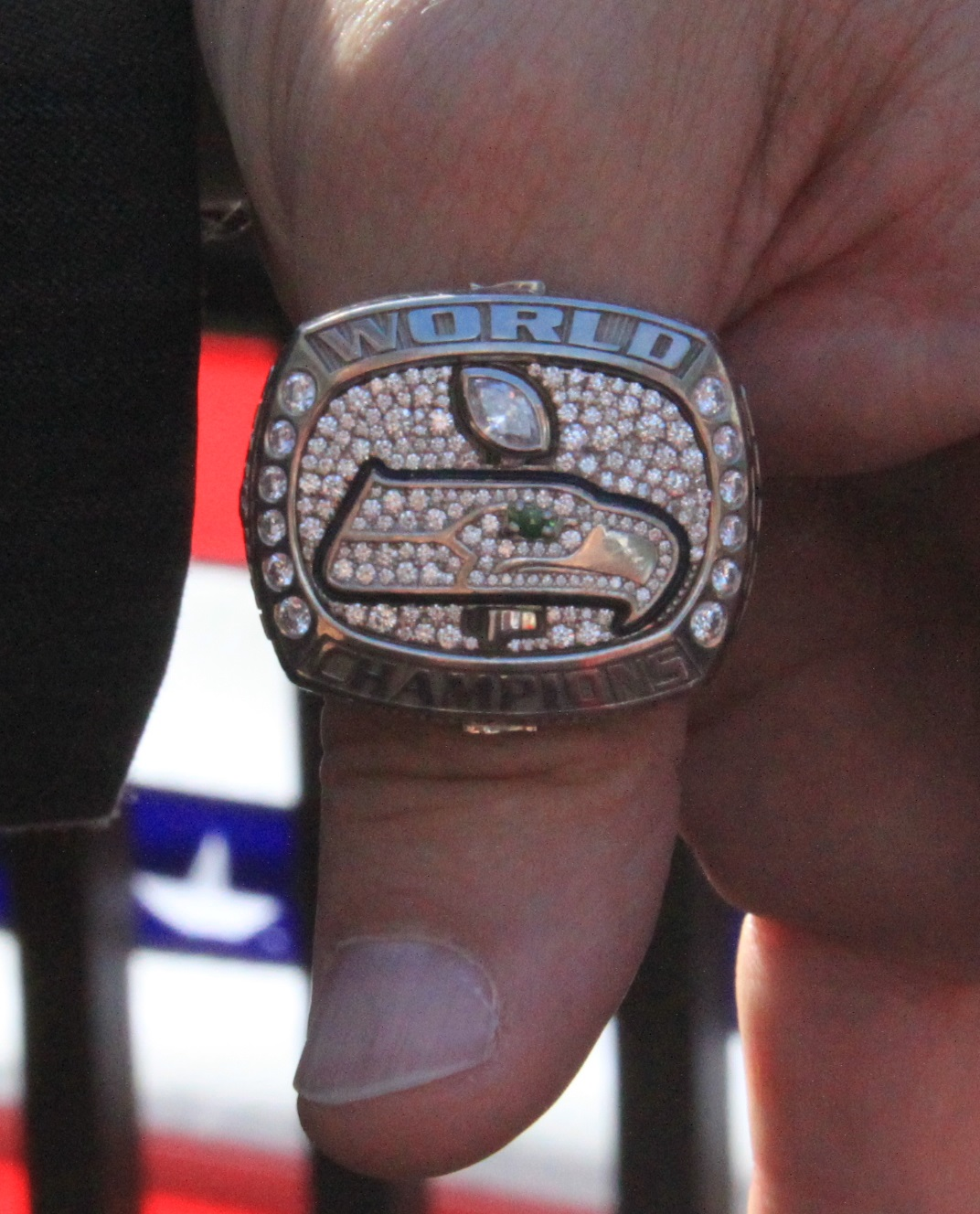
Seahawks 2013 Championship Ring

=== Super Bowl appearances ===
Season	Super Bowl	Head coach	Location	Stadium	Opponent	Result	Record
2005	XL	Mike Holmgren	Detroit, Michigan	Ford Field	Pittsburgh Steelers	L 10–21	15–4
**2013**	XLVIII	Pete Carroll	East Rutherford, New Jersey	MetLife Stadium	Denver Broncos	**W** 43–8	16–3
2014	XLIX	Pete Carroll	Glendale, Arizona	University of Phoenix Stadium	New England Patriots	L 24–28	14–5
**2025**	LX	Mike Macdonald	Santa Clara, California	Levi's Stadium	New England Patriots	**W** 29–13	17–3

=== Individual awards ===
Bold indicates those elected to the Pro Football Hall of Fame.

NFL Most Valuable Player
Season	Player	Position
2005	Shaun Alexander	RB

NFL Offensive Player of the Year
Season	Player	Position
2005	Shaun Alexander	RB
2025	Jaxon Smith-Njigba	WR

NFL Defensive Player of the Year
Season	Player	Position
1984	**Kenny Easley**	S
1992	**Cortez Kennedy**	DT

Super Bowl Most Valuable Player
Season	Player	Position
XLVIII	Malcolm Smith	LB
LX	Kenneth Walker III	RB

NFL Comeback Player of the Year
Season	Player	Position
2022	Geno Smith	QB

Walter Payton Man of the Year
Season	Player	Position
1994	**Steve Largent**	WR
2020	Russell Wilson	QB

NFL Coach of the Year
Season	Coach
1978	Jack Patera
1984	Chuck Knox

NFL Executive of the Year
Season	Executive
1978	John Thompson
2025	John Schneider

=== NFL All-Decade and Anniversary team selections ===
Bold indicates those elected to the Pro Football Hall of Fame.

**NFL 1980s All-Decade Team**
No.	Player	Position	Tenure
80	**Steve Largent**	WR	1980–1989
45	**Kenny Easley**	S	1981–1987

**NFL 1990s All-Decade Team**
No.	Player	Position	Tenure
96	**Cortez Kennedy**	DT	1990–1999
81	Michael Bates	KR	1993–1995

**NFL 2000s All-Decade Team**
No.	Player	Position	Tenure
76	**Steve Hutchinson**	G	2000–2019
32	**Edgerrin James**	RB	2009
71	**Walter Jones**	T	2000–2009
37	Shaun Alexander	RB	2000–2007

**NFL 100th Anniversary All-Time Team**
No.	Player	Position	Tenure
17	**Devin Hester**	PR	2016
81	**Walter Jones**	T	1997–2009
80	**Steve Largent**	WR	1976–1989
93	**John Randle**	DT	2000–2003
80	**Jerry Rice**	WR	2004

**NFL 2010s All-Decade Team**
No.	Player	Position	Tenure
17	**Devin Hester**	PR	2016
24	Marshawn Lynch	RB	2010–2015, 2019
25	Richard Sherman	CB	2011–2017
29	Earl Thomas	S	2010–2018
54	Bobby Wagner	LB	2012–2021, 2023
—	Pete Carroll	Coach	2010–2023

=== Pro Bowl selections ===
Seahawks players named to the Pro Bowl:

- **QB** Sam Darnold, Matt Hasselbeck (3), Dave Krieg (3), Warren Moon, Geno Smith (2), Russell Wilson (9)
- **FB** Michael Robinson, Mack Strong (2), John Williams (2)
- **HB** Shaun Alexander (3), Marshawn Lynch (4), Curt Warner (3), Chris Warren (3)
- **LT** Duane Brown (2), Walter Jones (9), Russell Okung
- **LG** Steve Hutchinson (3)
- **C** Robbie Tobeck, Max Unger (2)
- **RG**
- **RT**
- **TE** Jimmy Graham (2)
- **WR** Doug Baldwin (2), Brian Blades, Steve Largent (7), DK Metcalf (2), Jaxon Smith-Njigba (2)
- **DE** Cliff Avril, Michael Bennett (3), Jacob Green (2), Patrick Kerney, DeMarcus Lawrence, Michael Sinclair (3)
- **DT** Cortez Kennedy (8), John Randle, Joe Nash, Leonard Williams (2)
- **LB** Chad Brown (2), Julian Peterson (3), Rufus Porter, Lofa Tatupu (3), Bobby Wagner (9), KJ Wright, Fredd Young (3)
- **CB** Dave Brown, Brandon Browner, Shaquill Griffin, Richard Sherman (4), Shawn Springs, Marcus Trufant, Devon Witherspoon (3), Riq Woolen
- **SS** Jamal Adams, Kam Chancellor (4), Kenny Easley (5)
- **FS** Quandre Diggs (3), Julian Love, Eugene Robinson (2), Earl Thomas (6), Darryl Williams
- **PK** Norm Johnson, Jason Myers
- **P** Michael Dickson, Rick Tuten
- **RS** Bobby Joe Edmonds, Tyler Lockett, Rashid Shaheed, Leon Washington
- **ST** Alex Bannister, Nick Bellore (2), Rufus Porter, Fredd Young
- **LS** Tyler Ott

=== First-team All-Pro selections ===
The following Seahawks have been named AP first-team All-Pro (Note: Only Associated Press (AP) All-Pro selections are included.)

- **QB**
- **FB** Michael Robinson, Mack Strong
- **HB** Shaun Alexander, Marshawn Lynch
- **LT** Walter Jones (4)
- **LG** Steve Hutchinson (2)
- **C** Max Unger
- **RG**
- **RT**
- **TE**
- **WR** Steve Largent, Jaxon Smith-Njigba
- **DE** Patrick Kerney
- **DT** Cortez Kennedy (3), Joe Nash
- **LB** Lofa Tatupu, Bobby Wagner (6), Fredd Young
- **CB** Richard Sherman (3)
- **SS** Kenny Easley (3)
- **FS** Earl Thomas (3)
- **PK** Norm Johnson
- **P** Michael Dickson
- **RS** Bobby Joe Edmonds, Tyler Lockett

== Radio and television ==
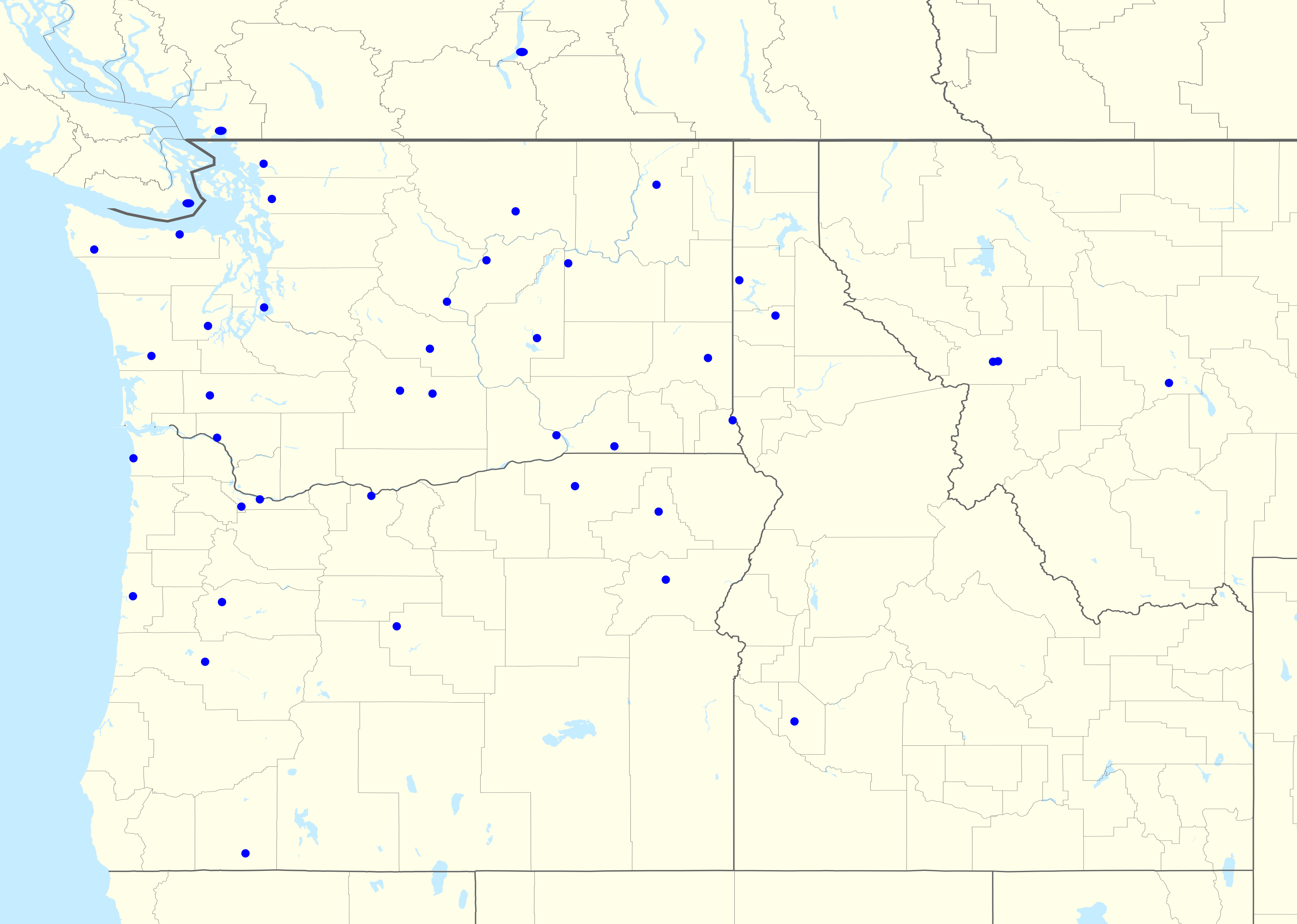
Map of radio affiliates (lower 48 and Canada).

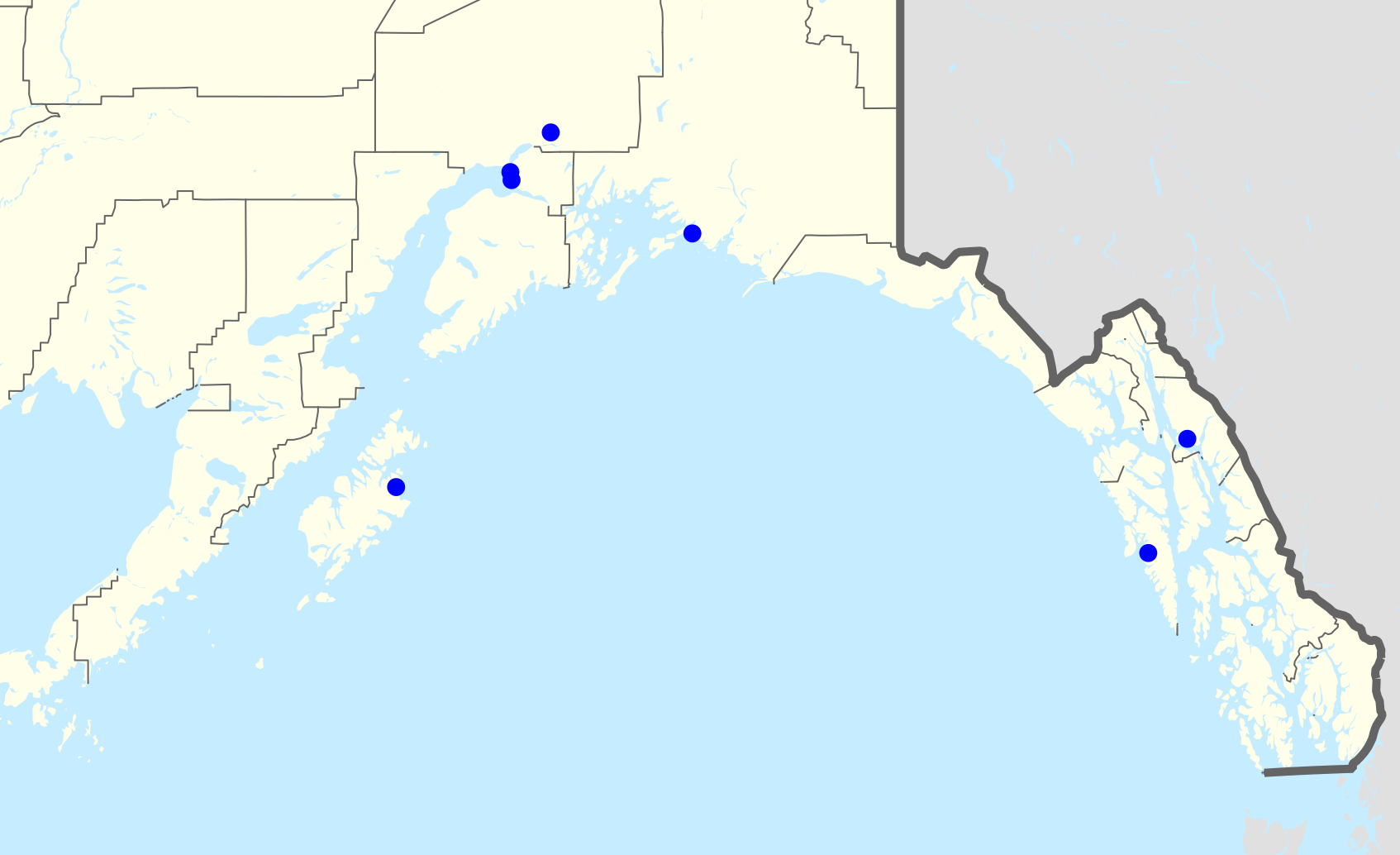
Map of radio affiliates (Alaska).

The Seahawks' flagship station is KIRO 710 kHz – KIRO-FM 97.3 MHz. Games are heard on 47 stations in five western states and Canada. Since the 2024 season, Columbia Banking System, Inc. holds naming rights for the broadcasts under the moniker of the "Columbia Bank Radio Network" (previously the "Umpqua Bank Radio Network" until 2025); Microsoft previously held the naming rights, calling it the "Bing Radio Network" after their web search engine. The current announcers are former Seahawks players Steve Raible (who was the team's color commentator from 1982 to 2003) and Dave Wyman. The Raible-Wyman regular season pairing has been together since the final four games of 2017 but became full time starting in 2018. On local television broadcast preseason games are split between former Seahawks Paul Moyer, Sam Adkins, and Brock Huard. Pete Gross, who called the games from 1976 until just days before his death from cancer in 1992, is a member of the team's Ring of Honor. Other past announcers include Steve Thomas from 1992 to 1997, Lee Hamilton (also known as "Hacksaw") from 1998 to 1999, Brian Davis from 2000 to 2003, and former Seahawk Warren Moon from 2004 to 2017.

Preseason games not shown on national networks were produced in-house by Seahawks Broadcasting and televised by KING-TV, channel 5 (and, in 2008, also on sister station KONG-TV since KING, an NBC affiliate, was committed to the Summer Olympics in China). Kate Scott became the announcer for Seahawks TV preseason games in 2023, replacing Curt Menefee (the host of Fox NFL Sunday) who had been the Seahawks' TV voice since the 2009 preseason. KCPQ-TV, which airs most of the Seahawks' regular-season games (as the Seattle-Tacoma area's Fox affiliate), became the television partner for the team in 2012 and replaced KING-TV as broadcaster for preseason games, but KING-TV regained the partnership in 2022; simulcasts of any Seahawks games on ESPN's Monday Night Football air (as of the 2018 season) on CBS affiliate KIRO-TV. In addition, any Saturday or Sunday afternoon games broadcast by CBS (usually – but not always – with the Seahawks hosting an AFC opponent) will air on KIRO-TV.

=== Radio affiliates ===
==== Washington ====
City	Call Sign	Frequency
Aberdeen	KDUX-FM	104.7 kHz
Bellingham	KPUG	1170 kHz
Centralia	KMNT	104.3 MHz
Chelan	KOZI-FM	93.5 MHz
Colfax	KMAX	840 kHz
Colville	KCRK-FM	92.1 MHz
Ellensburg	KXLE	1240 kHz
Longview	KEDO	1270 kHz
Moses Lake	KBSN	1470 kHz
Mount Vernon	KAPS	660 kHz
Olympia	KYYO	96.9 MHz
Omak	KNCW	92.7 MHz
Port Angeles	KONP	1450 kHz
Seattle (Flagship station)	KIRO	710 kHz
Seattle (Flagship station)	KIRO-FM	97.3 MHz
Shelton	KMAS	1030 kHz
Spokane	KHTQ	94.5 MHz
Tri-Cities	KONA	610 kHz
Walla Walla	KUJ	1420 kHz
Wenatchee	KPQ	560 kHz
Yakima	KIT	1280 kHz
Yakima	KMGW	99.3 MHz

==== Alaska ====
City	Call Sign	Frequency
Anchorage	KBYR	700 kHz
Anchorage	KRAK	102.1 MHz
Cordova	KLAM	1450 kHz
Juneau	KINY	800 kHz
Kodiak	KVOK	560 kHz
Sitka	KIFW	1230 kHz

==== Idaho ====
City	Call Sign	Frequency
Boise	KBOI	670 kHz
Lewiston	KCLK	1430 kHz
St. Maries	KOFE	1240 kHz

==== Montana ====
City	Call Sign	Frequency
Helena	KCAP	950 kHz
Missoula	KGRZ	1450 kHz
Missoula	KYLT	1340 kHz

==== Oregon ====
City	Call Sign	Frequency
Astoria	KCRX-FM	102.3 MHz
Baker City	KBKR-FM	95.3 MHz
Bend	KRCO	690 kHz
Eugene	KUJZ	95.3 MHz
La Grande	KRJT	105.9 MHz
Lebanon	KGAL	1580 kHz
Medford	KTMT	580 kHz
Newport	KCUP	1230 kHz
Pendleton	KTIX	1240 kHz
Portland	KRSK	1080 kHz
Portland	KGON	92.3 MHz
The Dalles	KODL	1440 kHz

==== British Columbia ====
City	Call Sign	Frequency
Kelowna	CKFR	1150 kHz
Vancouver	CISL	650 kHz
Victoria	CFAX	1070 kHz

== Notes and references ==
Explanatory notes

Citations

Preceded by Baltimore Ravens	Super Bowl champions 2013 (XLVIII)	Succeeded by New England Patriots
Preceded by Philadelphia Eagles	Super Bowl champions 2025 (LX)	Succeeded by Incumbent
