= Rufus Porter =

Rufus Porter may refer to:

- Rufus Porter (painter) (1792–1884), American painter, inventor, and founder of Scientific American magazine
- Rufus Porter (American football), American football linebacker in the National Football League
