= Blitz (mascot) =

Mascot for the NFL's Seattle Seahawks

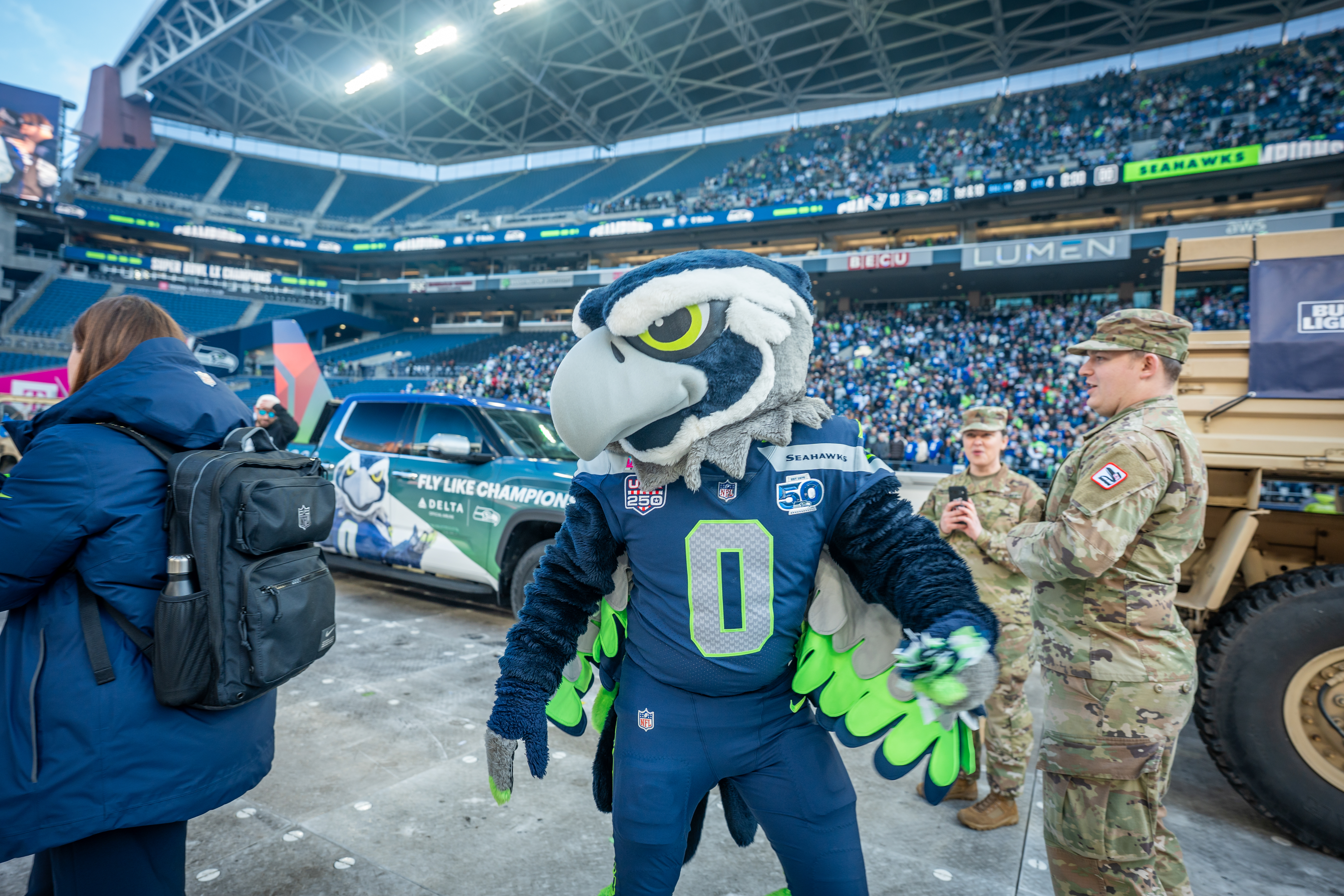
- Blitz in 2026
- Team: Seattle Seahawks
- Origin of name: Seattle, WA, USA
- First seen: September 13, 1998
- Website: https://www.seahawks.com/mascots/blitz/

Blitz is the official mascot of the Seattle Seahawks, a team in the National Football Conference of the National Football League. A large blue bird, Blitz made his debut on September 13, 1998, at the Seahawks' home opener at the Kingdome in Seattle, Washington.

After his inception Blitz's appearance changed slightly several times (including subtle changes in color in accordance with the team's updated scheme implemented after moving to Qwest Field in 2002) before a dramatic facelift in 2004, in an effort to make him appear less menacing to children by introducing friendlier facial features. A new look was introduced in 2014, involving an update to Blitz's face that more closely resembles the Seahawks logo. In addition to the longstanding look of a blue anthropomorphic bird of medium height and wearing a Seahawks uniform (number 0), the updated Blitz features the piercing green eyes and blue and gray head represented on the team logo.

A second mascot, named Boom, was also introduced in 2014, as an "official sidekick" to Blitz. In addition to green eyes, Boom features green hair, a backwards Seahawks cap, and a number 00 Seahawks uniform.

Since the character's introduction in 1998, Blitz has been an integral part in the Seahawks' "Ready, Set, Goals!" reading program for children. In addition to all Seahawks home games, Blitz appears at hundreds of community and charity events throughout the year. He has also appeared at the Super Bowl and the Pro Bowl. The band The Presidents of the United States of America recorded his theme song, "This Is a Blitz."
