= Robbie Tobeck =

American football player (born 1970)

No. 61
- Positions: Guard, center

Personal information
- Born: March 6, 1970 (age 56); Lake Wales, Florida, U.S.
- Listed height: 6 ft 4 in (1.93 m)
- Listed weight: 297 lb (135 kg)

Career information
- College: Kilgore (1989–1990); Washington State (1991–1992)
- NFL draft: 1993: undrafted

Career history
- Atlanta Falcons (1993–1999); Seattle Seahawks (2000–2006)

Awards and highlights
- Pro Bowl (2005); Seattle Seahawks 35th Anniversary team; Seattle Seahawks Top 50 players; Second-team All-Pac-10 (1992)

Career NFL statistics
- Games played: 176
- Games started: 166
- Fumble recoveries: 4
- Receptions: 2
- Receiving yards: 15
- Receiving touchdowns: 1
- Stats at Pro Football Reference

Robert Lee Tobeck (/ˈtoʊbɛk/; born March 6, 1970) is an American former professional football player who was a center for fourteen seasons in the National Football League (NFL). Tobeck played seven seasons for the Seattle Seahawks after being acquired as a free agent from the Atlanta Falcons after signing as a rookie in 1993.

Tobeck started his college career after accepting a scholarship to Liberty University in Lynchburg, Virginia, but was redshirted as a freshman. He transferred to Kilgore College, a junior college in Kilgore, Texas for two years (1989–90) and then went on to play big league college football for the Washington State Cougars.

During high school, Tobeck attended New Port Richey (FL) Christian, which, until his senior year, only offered a flag football program. He only played four games of tackle football in High school. However, the basketball program was a standout and Tobeck was a major part of its program.

Tobeck retired at the end of the 2006 NFL season, on January 15, 2007, after a playoff loss to the Chicago Bears. He played in two Super Bowls, Super Bowl XXXIII as a member of the Falcons and Super Bowl XL as a member of the Seahawks. Tobeck also made the NFC Pro Bowl Team in 2005.

After football, Tobeck went into the insurance business and now co-owns Griffin MacLean Insurance Brokers. Tobeck has also dabbled in radio in his time since playing as a co-host of The Outdoor Line radio show, although he is no longer with the show.
