= Rufus Porter (American football) =

American football player (born 1965)

No. 97, 59
- Position: Linebacker

Personal information
- Born: May 18, 1965 (age 61); Amite, Louisiana, U.S.
- Listed height: 6 ft 1 in (1.85 m)
- Listed weight: 218 lb (99 kg)

Career information
- High school: Baton Rouge (LA) Capitol
- College: Southern
- NFL draft: 1988: undrafted

Career history
- Seattle Seahawks (1988–1994); New Orleans Saints (1995–1996); Tampa Bay Buccaneers (1997)

Awards and highlights
- First-team All-Pro (1989); 2× Pro Bowl (1988, 1989); Seattle Seahawks 35th Anniversary team; Seattle Seahawks Top 50 players

Career NFL statistics
- Sacks: 41
- Interceptions: 3
- Games: 135
- Stats at Pro Football Reference

Rufus Porter (born May 18, 1965) is an American former professional football player who was a linebacker in the National Football League (NFL) for the Seattle Seahawks, New Orleans Saints, and Tampa Bay Buccaneers. He played college football for the Southern Jaguars.

== College career ==
Porter played at Southern University.

== Professional career ==
=== Seattle Seahawks ===
Porter played for the Seahawks from 1988-1994. He was selected to two Pro Bowls and earned one All-Pro during his tenure. Porter suffered a serious groin injury in a game vs. Houston in 1990.

=== New Orleans Saints ===
Porter played for the Saints for two seasons.

=== Tampa Bay Buccaneers ===
Porter played his last NFL season (1997) with the Buccaneers. The Bucs brought him in to play strongside linebacker to replace Lonnie Marts. Porter was considered a better fit for the defense, as he had played under Bucs defensive coordinator Monte Kiffin for the Saints.

== Personal ==
Porter's son, Rufus Jr. played linebacker for Louisiana Tech University.

Porter operates the nonprofit organization 8to80 that focuses on building healthy lives in the Baton Rouge area.
