= KRQT =

- Castle Rock, Washington; United States
- Broadcast area: Centralia/Chehalis/Longview, Washington
- Frequency: 107.1 MHz
- Branding: Rocket 107

Programming
- Format: Classic rock
- Affiliations: Citadel Media

Ownership
- Owner: Bicoastal Media Licenses IV, LLC

History
- First air date: 1993 (as KAZL)
- Former call signs: KAZL (1993–1996)

Technical information
- Licensing authority: FCC
- Facility ID: 2813
- Class: C3
- ERP: 800 watts
- HAAT: 523 meters (1,716 ft)
- Transmitter coordinates: 46°20′18.00″N 123°5′45.00″W
- Repeater: 107.1 KRQT-FM1 (Longview)

Links
- Public license information: Public file; LMS
- Webcast: Listen live
- Website: rocket107.com

KRQT (107.1 FM, "Rocket 107 Classic Rock") is a radio station broadcasting a classic rock music format. Licensed to Castle Rock, Washington, United States, the station is currently owned by Bicoastal Media Licenses IV, LLC and features programming from Citadel Media.
