= KBAM (AM) =

- Longview, Washington; United States
- Frequency: 1400 kHz
- Branding: Real Country

Programming
- Format: Country
- Affiliations: Compass Media Networks

Ownership
- Owner: Bicoastal Media, LLC; (Bicoastal Media Licenses IV, LLC)
- Sister stations: KEDO

History
- First air date: May 1938
- Former call signs: KWLK (1938–1958); KEDO (1958–2021)

Technical information
- Licensing authority: FCC
- Facility ID: 38379
- Class: C
- Power: 1,000 watts
- Transmitter coordinates: 46°8′57″N 122°58′29″W
- Translator: 99.1 K256CQ (Longview)

Links
- Public license information: Public file; LMS
- Webcast: Listen live
- Website: kbamcountry.com

KBAM (1400 AM) is an radio station licensed to Longview, Washington, United States. Owned by Bicoastal Media, it broadcasts a country music format branded "Real Country". The studios are on 14th Avenue in Longview.

KBAM programming is also heard on FM translator K256CQ at 99.1 MHz in Longview.

== History ==
The station signed on the air in May 1938. Its original call sign was KWLK and it broadcast on 780 kilocycles. It moved to 1370 kHz in 1940, then to 1400 kHz in 1941, as a result of the North American Regional Broadcasting Agreement (NARBA). The station changed its call sign to KEDO on November 10, 1958. On September 6, 2010, KEDO changed its format from oldies to talk.

On September 2, 2021, the KEDO call sign and the talk/sports format moved to 1270 AM Longview, swapping frequencies and call signs with country-formatted KBAM, which moved to 1400 AM.

== Previous logo ==
(KBAM's logo as KEDO under previous oldies format)
