= KEDO (AM) =

- Longview, Washington; United States
- Frequency: 1270 kHz
- Branding: AM 1270 FM 99.9 KEDO

Programming
- Format: Talk and sports
- Affiliations: Fox Sports Radio; Premiere Networks; Westwood One

Ownership
- Owner: Bicoastal Media Licenses IV, LLC
- Sister stations: KBAM

History
- First air date: August 15, 1955
- Former call signs: KBAM (1955–2021)

Technical information
- Licensing authority: FCC
- Facility ID: 2814
- Class: D
- Power: 5,000 watts (day); 83 watts (night)
- Transmitter coordinates: 46°10′59″N 122°57′29″W
- Translator: 99.9 K260DH (Longview)

Links
- Public license information: Public file; LMS
- Webcast: Listen live
- Website: kedoam.com

KEDO (1270 kHz) is a commercial radio station licensed to Longview, Washington, United States. It airs a talk and sports format and is owned by Bicoastal Media Licenses IV, LLC. The studios are on 14th Avenue in Longview.

By day, it is powered at 5,000 watts using a non-directional antenna. But to protect other stations on 1270 AM from interference, at night it greatly reduces power to 83 watts. The transmitter is on Lone Oak Road at Barefoot Boulevard in Longview Heights, Washington. Programming is also heard on FM translator K260DH at 99.9 MHz in Longview.

== History ==
The station signed on the air on August 15, 1955. Its original call sign was KBAM. At first, it was a daytimer station, required to go off the air at sunset. It later got authorization for 83 watts at night.

In July 2014, KBAM switched to a hit country format. The morning show was hosted by 2014 "New Mexico Broadcasters Association DJ of The Year" Jim Halk (Hawk), who also oversaw the programming. The station added an FM translator at 93.5 FM, rebranding itself as "Now Country 93.5 & 1270AM K-BAM".

On September 3, 2021, the KBAM call sign and the country format moved to co-owned 1400 AM in Longview. It swapped frequencies, formats and call signs with talk and sports-formatted KEDO, which moved to 1270 AM.
