= NFL player conduct policy =

On April 10, 2007, the National Football League (NFL) introduced a new conduct policy to help control on and off-field behavior by its players and preserve the league's public image. The policy, introduced by NFL commissioner Roger Goodell, implements a tougher, new personal-conduct policy, and under conditions of the previous policy handed down two of the harshest suspensions in NFL history for off-field misdeeds. Each player that has been suspended must reapply for reinstatement. The policy only applies to the player's personal lives and image in the public spotlight. The NFL conducts separate investigations for drug and alcohol abuse and performance enhancement.

== History ==
"It is important that the NFL be represented consistently by outstanding people as well as great football players, coaches, and staff. We hold ourselves to higher standards of responsible conduct because of what it means to be part of the National Football League. We have long had policies and programs designed to encourage responsible behavior, and this policy is a further step in ensuring that everyone who is part of the NFL meets that standard. We will continue to review the policy and modify it as warranted."
~Roger Goodell, Commissioner of the National Football League

On September 1, 2006, some days prior to the start of the 2006 NFL season, Roger Goodell assumed the office of Commissioner of the NFL. Goodell was met with expectations of enforcing the NFL's image to the media. In the months leading up to Goodell's ascension, nine players from the Cincinnati Bengals had been arrested. Goodell and the National Football League Players Association (NFLPA) decided that teams will be responsible for the conduct of their employees, and will be subject to discipline for any transgressions.

Goodell had consulted with Gene Upshaw, former executive director of the NFLPA, and also created a six-man player advisory committee to discuss conduct, discipline and other topics.

The first players to feel the teeth of the new policy were Tennessee Titans cornerback Adam "Pacman" Jones and Cincinnati Bengals wide receiver Chris Henry, college teammates at West Virginia whose first two years in the NFL were marred by arrests. The third player suspended was Chicago Bears defensive tackle Tank Johnson. On August 24, 2007, Atlanta Falcons starting quarterback Michael Vick filed a plea agreement and pleaded guilty in his involvement in illegal dog fighting and euthanization, and was suspended indefinitely without pay; his reinstatement occurred in time for him to play in the 2009–2010 season.

== List of significant suspensions ==
Date(s) suspended	Reason	Suspension length	Name	Position	Team at the time of suspension
April 10, 2007	Battery, uttering death threat, felony coercion	Entire 2007 season	Adam "Pacman" Jones	Cornerback	Tennessee Titans
April 10, 2007	Aggravated assault with a firearm, allowing female minors alcohol, driving while drunk, assault, etc.	First 8 games of 2007 season	Chris Henry	Wide receiver	Cincinnati Bengals
June 4, 2007	Possession of concealed weapon, possession of unlawful assault rifles and other, some loaded, firearms in his home with children present	First 8 games of 2007 season	Terry "Tank" Johnson	Defensive tackle	Chicago Bears
August 24, 2007 – July 27, 2009	Promoting, funding, and facilitating a dog fighting ring on his property, hanging and drowning dogs who did not perform well, failure to cooperate fully with police, etc.	First 2 regular games of 2009 season	Michael Vick	Quarterback	Atlanta Falcons
October 14, 2008	Fighting with his bodyguard	Indefinite, ultimately 4 games	Adam "Pacman" Jones	Cornerback	Dallas Cowboys
August 13, 2009	DUI manslaughter	Entire 2009 season	Donté Stallworth	Wide receiver	Cleveland Browns
April 21, 2010	Sexual assault allegation	First 6 games of 2010 season, then reduced to 4 games	Ben Roethlisberger	Quarterback	Pittsburgh Steelers
September 8, 2014	Arrest for domestic violence/aggravated assault	Initially 2 games, then increased to indefinetly only to be overturned two months later	Ray Rice	Running back	Baltimore Ravens

== Suspended players ==
=== Adam "Pacman" Jones ===
Tennessee Titans cornerback Adam "Pacman" Jones, facing felony charges in two states, was suspended for the entire 2007 season and given specific conditions to meet before he is reinstated, and he can be reinstated after the Titans' eleventh game. There were 10 occasions in which Jones was interviewed by police, the most recent during the NBA All-Star weekend in Las Vegas. Police there recommended felony and misdemeanor charges against Jones after a fight and shooting at what Jones refers to as a "strip club", which left one man paralyzed. Jones later appealed his suspension, saying he was "just being rebellious", but withdrew the request weeks later. On June 20, 2007, the Las Vegas Metropolitan Police Department and Clark County District Attorney's office announced that Jones will face two felony charges stemming from the strip club melee that occurred on February 19, 2007. While the charges have since been dropped, Jones still faces civil actions, and his reinstatement was not to be considered until after the 2008 Pro Bowl. On June 2, 2008, NFL Commissioner Roger Goodell cleared Jones to participate in preseason workouts for the Dallas Cowboys, who had traded for him during his suspension, and also said that a decision on Jones' reinstatement for the regular season would be made by September 1, six days before the Cowboys' first 2008 regular-season game. The league announced at that time that Jones' full reinstatement would depend on "demonstrating that he can conduct himself in a lawful and reliable manner." On August 26 Jones found himself fully reinstated, only to be suspended indefinitely on October 14 after an altercation with his bodyguard in a Dallas hotel.

=== Chris Henry ===
Cincinnati Bengals wide receiver Chris Henry, was arrested five times in three states between December 2005 and April 2008, was suspended for the first eight games of the 2007 season. He also had to comply with several conditions before returning. Henry was arrested four times in a 14-month span, and received a two-game league suspension last year. He was one of nine Bengals arrested in nine months. Henry was required to not get into further trouble with the law and had to cooperate fully with required counseling, education and treatment assigned to him under league programs.

Henry returned for the second half of the 2007 season but played a minor role on an 7-9 Bengals team. In April 2008, the Bengals released Henry after he was charged with misdemeanor and criminal damaging. He was accused of punching an 18-year-old male in the face and breaking a window in the individual's car. A warrant for Henry's arrest was issued and he surrendered the following day, a police spokesman said. In August 2008, the Bengals re-signed Henry. On December 17, 2009, Henry died from injuries sustained from an accident stemming from a domestic dispute between him and his fiancée.

=== Tank Johnson ===
On April 30, 2007, Terry "Tank" Johnson pleaded guilty to a misdemeanor weapons charge as part of an arrangement with prosecutors that will keep him from serving additional jail time. He was sentenced to 45 days in jail, which was served concurrently with a four-month sentence he was already serving in the Cook County Jail for violating his probation; to donate $2,500 to the Gurnee, Illinois Police Department and $2,500 to the Gurnee Exchange Club's child abuse prevention program.

Johnson's release from jail on May 13 ended his legal problems from the December 2006 weapons incident. The league ultimately suspended Johnson for half of the regular season on June 4. However, he will have the opportunity to reduce the sentence to six games if he complies with Commissioner Goodell's guidelines of behavior, which include going to counseling.

On June 22, Johnson was pulled over speeding in Arizona. According to the police, he was stopped by the police after traveling at forty miles per hour in a twenty-five-mile per hour zone. He was later suspected of drinking, but was released without being booked or charged.

On June 25, 2007, Johnson was released from his contract by the Chicago Bears as a result of the June 22 incident. Bears General manager Jerry Angelo stated that he had "no room for error left." The results of Johnson's blood tests were still pending when the Bears made their decision. On July 2, it was announced that Johnson was under the legal limit and will not be charged with driving under the influence.

On September 18, 2007, Johnson agreed to terms of a two-year contract with the Dallas Cowboys, but was unable to contact the team until week 9 of the 2007 NFL season.

=== Michael Vick ===
Beginning on April 25, 2007, a large house and surrounding 15-acre (61,000 m^{2}) property Michael Vick owned in rural Surry County, Virginia where his 26-year-old cousin Davon T. Boddie had been residing became part of a continuing police investigation for possible operation of an illegal dog fighting ring. The action came after police executed a search warrant following two narcotics arrests of Boddie within a week in the Virginia Peninsula cities of Newport News and Hampton (each about 20 miles (32 km) away from the Surry County property) earlier in April. Boddie had given the address of Vick's property in Surry County as his home address when arrested. Earlier, in February 2007, Boddie was convicted in the City of Norfolk of disorderly conduct. At that time, he was carrying a Georgia driver's license giving his address as a house in Duluth, Georgia which was once owned by Vick.

According to ESPN, during the April 25 narcotics-related search of Vick's home and property at 1915 Moonlight Drive in the southeastern portion of Surry County, police discovered a large number of animals, and evidence which they felt indicated dog fighting. They called animal-control officers, who saw what they said was evidence that dogfights had taken place there. Police obtained another search warrant, and, with the help of animal control officials from several localities, removed 66 dogs, 55 of them pit bulls, and seized equipment and some physical evidence that could be associated with dog fighting. WAVY-TV reported that detectives also seized guns, illegal ammunition magazines, suspected marijuana and paperwork on dog fighting.

Vick, along with three others, was indicted by a federal grand jury on July 17, 2007, for "conspiracy to travel in interstate commerce in aid of unlawful activities and to sponsor a dog in animal fighting venture". The 18-page federal indictment outlines an extensive operation which included not only unlawful fighting, but violence against dogs which did not perform well including executions by electrocution, hanging, and shooting, as well as involving tens of thousands of dollars in gambling activity. The four face $350,000 in fines and six years in prison if convicted of the federal charges. The operation was based at Vick's 15-acre (61,000 m^{2}) property near Smithfield, Virginia, valued at over $700,000, which could conceivably be forfeited to the government, as the indictment also puts them on notice that the government intends to take possession of property used in the illegal operations and any proceeds.

In late April 2007, Vick denied his involvement and told The Atlanta Journal-Constitution "I'm never at the house...I left the house with my family...They just haven't been doing the right thing... It's unfortunate I have to take the heat behind it. If I'm not there, I don't know what's going on."

Vick appeared in court on July 26, 2007, and pleaded not guilty, the same date that the Atlanta Falcons began training camp. Later, Vick filed a plea agreement, and admitted his guilt. Vick was suspended without pay "indefinitely" by the National Football League on August 24. On August 13, 2009, Vick signed a one-year contract with the Philadelphia Eagles. He was placed on the exempt/commissioner's permission list on September 5, 2009. On September 15, 2009, Vick was activated to the 53-man roster.

=== Ben Roethlisberger ===
On July 17, 2009, a civil suit was filed in Washoe County, Nevada District Court accusing Ben Roethlisberger of sexually assaulting Andrea McNulty, 31, in June 2008 in his hotel room while he was in Lake Tahoe for a celebrity golf tournament. No charges were filed in the case.

On March 5, 2010, it was revealed that a woman from Milledgeville, Georgia had accused Roethlisberger of sexual assault. While Roethlisberger was once again not charged with a crime following the events at the nightclub, the league still suspended him for six games, which was later reduced to four. This was the first time in league history a player has been suspended under the personal conduct policy without being charged with a crime. Roethlisberger and Ezekiel Elliott are the only two players to have been suspended under this policy without being charged with a crime.

=== Ray Rice ===
On February 15, 2014, Ray Rice and his fiancée Janay Palmer were arrested and charged with assault after a physical altercation at Revel Casino in Atlantic City, New Jersey. Celebrity news website TMZ posted a video of Rice dragging Palmer's body out of an elevator after knocking her out. The Ravens issued a statement following TMZ's release of the video, calling Rice's domestic violence arrest a "serious matter". The matter is being handled by the Atlantic County Prosecutor's Office.

On March 27, 2014, a grand jury indicted Rice on third-degree aggravated assault, with a possible jail sentence of three to five years and a fine of up to $15,000. Rice married Palmer on March 28, 2014. For the incident, Rice was suspended for the first two games of the 2014 NFL season on July 25, 2014. The criminal charges were later dropped after Rice agreed to undergo court-supervised counseling. In a news conference announcing longer suspension lengths for future domestic violence incidents, NFL Commissioner Roger Goodell said that he "didn't get it right" in deciding Rice's punishment.

On September 8, 2014, TMZ released additional footage from an elevator camera showing Rice punching Palmer in the face. The Baltimore Ravens terminated Rice's contract as a result. Shortly afterward, Goodell announced that Rice had been suspended from the NFL indefinitely. He was reinstated on November 28, 2014, after winning an appeal.

=== Adrian Peterson ===
Adrian Peterson was indicted by a Montgomery County, Texas, grand jury on charges of reckless or negligent injury to a child on September 12, 2014. He was subsequently deactivated for one game by the Vikings. Photos posted on TMZ.com revealed his 4-year-old son's legs with slash-like wounds. The prosecution in the case alleges that Peterson used a tree branch to beat his young son repeatedly on his back, buttocks, genitals, ankles, and legs. In early November the Vikings' running back had entered a no contest plea. Adrian Peterson was also ordered to serve 80 hours worth of community service while also being placed on probation. However, later on in November 2014 the NFL suspended Peterson for the rest of the season without pay. On December 12, 2014, the NFL apparently had denied his appeal.

=== Aaron Hernandez ===
On June 18, 2013, Aaron Hernandez's house in North Attleboro was searched by police for several hours in connection with an investigation into the shooting death of a friend, Odin Lloyd. Lloyd's body was found in an industrial park about a mile away from Hernandez's house with multiple gunshot wounds to the back and chest. The Massachusetts State Police obtained a search warrant after evidence surfaced that Hernandez intentionally destroyed his home security system. A cell phone belonging to Hernandez was turned over to police "in pieces" and Hernandez allegedly hired a "team of house cleaners" the same day Lloyd's body was discovered, raising additional suspicion.

On June 20, 2013, the Boston Herald reported that Hernandez had been "barred" from Gillette Stadium by the Patriots. According to NFL.com, Patriots owner Robert Kraft decided to have Patriots staff ask Hernandez to leave because he did not want Gillette to be "the site of a media stakeout". However, the Boston Globe reported that the Patriots front office had decided days before Hernandez's arrest that if Hernandez were arrested on any charge related to the case, even an obstruction of justice charge, he would be released.

On June 26, 2013, Hernandez was taken from his home in handcuffs and into police custody. The Patriots released Hernandez about 90 minutes later, before officially knowing the charges against him. Their press release stated:

A young man was murdered last week and we extend our sympathies to the family and friends who mourn his loss. Words cannot express the disappointment we feel knowing that one of our players was arrested as a result of this investigation. We realize that law enforcement investigations into this matter are ongoing. We support their efforts and respect the process. At this time, we believe this transaction is simply the right thing to do.

Later that day, Hernandez was charged with first-degree murder, in addition to five gun-related charges; if convicted of first-degree murder, Hernandez faced life in prison without the possibility of parole; Hernandez could not face the death penalty, as the state of Massachusetts abolished the death penalty in 1984. Instead, he was held without bail at the Bristol County Jail.

Two other men were also arrested in connection with Lloyd's death: Carlos Ortiz, on June 27, 2013, and Ernest Wallace on June 28, 2013. Ortiz revealed to the police that Hernandez had secretly rented an apartment in Franklin, Massachusetts. A subsequent search of the apartment, according to the Associated Press, "turned up ammunition and clothing that police believe could be evidence in the murder case against him".

On August 22, 2013, Aaron Hernandez was indicted by a grand jury for the murder of Odin Lloyd.

On September 6, 2013, Hernandez was arraigned and pleaded not guilty to first-degree murder. He was held without bail, but reserved the right to request bail later.

On April 15, 2015, Hernandez was found guilty of first-degree murder, as well as five weapon charges, automatically being sentenced to life in prison without possibility of parole.

While on trial for Lloyd's murder, Hernandez was indicted for the 2012 double homicide of Daniel de Abreu and Safiro Furtado; he was acquitted of the double homicide after a 2017 trial. Five days after the acquittal, Hernandez was found dead in his cell by hanging, which was ruled a suicide. As his death occurred while the murder conviction was under appeal, the conviction was vacated. The decision to vacate the conviction was later reverted to its original find of guilty.

=== Daryl Washington ===
==== Banned substance abuse ====
On April 3, 2013, the NFL announced that Daryl Washington would be suspended for the first four games of the 2013 season for violating the league's substance policy.

On May 30, 2014, the NFL announced that Washington would be suspended for at least the 2014 season for once again violating the league's substance policy bringing his personal credibility and character into question after his statement from the 2013 violation: "I promise to work even harder and to not let you guys down anymore."

==== Assault ====
On May 3, 2013, Washington was arrested in Phoenix, Arizona on two counts of aggravated assault (and one count of criminal trespass in the first-degree) from an incident on May 1, 2013, involving his 27-year-old ex-girlfriend with whom he shares a daughter. The altercation concerns a custody dispute over the 5-month-old child. Phoenix Police accuse him of pushing her with two hands, causing her to fall and break her right collarbone. On March 24, 2014, he pleaded guilty to the crime of aggravated assault, a class 6 felony. Washington was sentenced to one-year of supervised probation on April 23, 2014.

=== Jonathan Dwyer ===
On Wednesday, September 17, 2014 Jonathan Dwyer was arrested because of two incidents at Dwyer's home in southeast Phoenix on July 21 at 8 a.m. and July 22 at 4 p.m., according to the Phoenix Police Department. The incidents concerned attacks against his wife and 18-month-old child.

Dwyer was booked into Maricopa County Jail on one count of aggravated assault causing a fracture, one count of aggravated assault involving a minor, two counts of criminal damage, one count of preventing the use of a phone in an emergency, and assault. He was freed the next morning on a $25,000 cash bond and ordered to wear an electronic monitoring device. He was also banned from any contact with the alleged victims, travels outside of Arizona and any involvement with weapons, drugs or alcohol.

Dwyer admitted to the incidents during interviews with detectives but denied physically assaulting his wife and baby son. According to police, a search warrant was executed at his home.

=== Greg Hardy ===
Prior to the 2015 NFL season, the NFL suspended defensive end Greg Hardy for the first ten games of the season, later reduced to four, as a result of a domestic violence case. On May 13, 2014, Hardy, then with the Carolina Panthers, was arrested for assault and communicating threats, after he was alleged to have assaulted an ex-girlfriend by grabbing her, throwing her into furniture, strangling her, and threatening to kill her. On July 15, a judge found him guilty of assault and communicating threats, and sentenced him to 18 months probation, suspending a 60-day jail sentence. When Hardy appealed the decision, requesting a jury trial, the victim failed to appear in court to testify. As a result, the prosecutor's office dropped the charges, citing their inability to locate the victim, and "reliable information" that the two parties had reached a civil settlement. Hardy was later deactivated by the Panthers and let go in free agency before signing with the Cowboys.

=== Martavis Bryant ===
Before the start of the 2015 NFL season, Martavis Bryant was suspended for four games in August for violating the league's substance abuse policy. He would return and play the rest of the season with the Steelers. During the suspension, he spent time in rehab in Houston. Bryant was charged with violating the substance abuse policy again, and suspended, this time for the entire 2016 NFL season.

=== Ezekiel Elliott ===
On August 11, 2017, the NFL suspended Dallas Cowboys running back Ezekiel Elliott for the first six games of the 2017 season, despite the lead NFL investigator in the case reportedly recommending no suspension. His suspension stems from various off-the-field incidents including being accused of domestic violence in 2016 by his ex-girlfriend who claimed on five different occasions he assaulted her. Despite never being charged, the NFL launched a year-long investigation into the allegations. In March 2017, Elliott was captured on video pulling down a woman's shirt exposing her breasts while watching a St. Patrick's Day parade in Dallas. Four months later in July 2017 he was allegedly involved in an altercation at a nightclub during which a DJ's nose was broken. Dallas police eventually suspended the investigation after they were unable to locate the victim.

== NFL Domestic Violence Policy ==
A Domestic Violence Policy has been put into effect after the Ray Rice domestic violence incident on August 28, 2014. Commissioner Roger Goodell has lengthened bans to six games for the first domestic violence incident and a lifetime ban for a second incident. This is after the NFL suspended Ray Rice for two games and receiving large amounts of criticism during the process.

The NFL has a history of inconsistently punishing domestic violence amongst its players. A majority of domestic violence violations are punished with about a 1.5-game suspension. The NFL rather has a consistent policy for punishing drug violations with performance-enhancing drugs and substance abuses averaging about 4 games suspension for the first offense and about 8 games suspension of performance-enhancing drugs and a 16 games suspension for substance abuse for a second offense.

The NFL has released a new Personal Conduct Policy on December 10, 2014. It is an updated version of the 2007 Personal Conduct Policy. It has added more infractions to the 2007 policy, which include violence against others and domestic violence. The disciplinary process is more detailed in terms of its investigative progress and consequences for infractions than its 2007 counterpart. The new policy will include counseling and treatment services for the offender and their victims.

As part of the domestic violence policy, the NFL will be educating high school students about domestic violence. The person inside the NFL that is in charge on working on domestic violence and sexual assault issues is Anna Isaacson, who Roger Goodell named the first vice president of social responsibility on September 15, 2014. She has created new training sessions for every player and league employee as well as convincing the NFL to put in $10 million for domestic violence advertisements. She also constructed a partnership between the NFL and the National Domestic Violence Hotline to fund more resources to the various call centers.

== Public response ==
=== Praise ===
The new policy has been praised by both NFL players and sports columnists as a necessity to help improve the National Football League's image. The new policy—which also applies to coaches and front office personnel and has the support of NFLPA director Gene Upshaw—prompted questions and strong reactions among players. Teammates of Chris Henry, including safety Madieu Williams, approved of the measure.

Oakland Raiders defensive tackle Warren Sapp stated, "I understand what they're doing. Some of these new-jack kids act like they're walking on water. Sometimes, they need to be slapped in the face to wake up."

New England Patriots owner Robert Kraft said of the policy, "I hope this sends a message to people in our league for how to conduct themselves. We have to be careful. People in America can't relate to overindulged athletes not acting responsibly."

=== Criticism ===
I hope it doesn't backfire. What happens if a coach, GM or owner gets a DUI? Then what? What if an ex-NFL player throws himself through a window in Miami? That still reflects on the NFL's image.
- Keyshawn Johnson, former NFL wide receiver, and current NFL broadcaster.

Many considered the suspensions on Jones and Henry to be too harsh, especially Jones', which was enforced despite Jones having not been convicted of any crime. Criticism was also drawn at the commissioner's ability to punish the rest of the player's team and revoke draft picks. Goodell's actions are also leaving the league vulnerable to legal action from player's lawyers.

When New England Patriots head coach Bill Belichick and his staff were accused of illegally videotaping the New York Jets' defensive playcalling signals in September 2007, Belichick was not suspended, but instead fined $500,000. The team was penalized a first round draft pick in 2008 as they qualified for the playoffs with a perfect 16–0 record, but would have been penalized with a second and third round pick had they failed to make the playoffs. (The Patriots still ended up with the New Orleans Saints' first-round pick in a trade, selecting Jerod Mayo with the pick.) The move was heavily criticized as being a double standard. Although the videotaping is not considered to violate personal conduct rules, NFL players, including Cincinnati Bengals quarterback Carson Palmer were critical of Commissioner Goodell's move. When Goodell penalized Belichick, he determined that the use of the camera during the Patriots’ season-opening 38–14 win over the New York Jets had no impact on the game.

== See also ==
- NFL controversies
- Spygate
- Minnesota Vikings boat party scandal
- Bad Newz Kennels dog fighting investigation
- Timeline of the Bad Newz Kennels dog fighting investigation
- O. J. Simpson murder case
- O. J. Simpson robbery case
- Deflategate
- Bounty Bowl
- New Orleans Saints bounty scandal
