= NFL controversies =

American football league controversies

The National Football League (NFL) is the premier professional American football league in the United States and the world, and is also one of the major North American professional sports leagues, and the largest sports league in the world by revenue. Controversies in the NFL include subjects such as questionable championship rulings prior to the creation of the NFL championship game in 1933, team relocation decisions, and criminal behavior by players. Many of the recent controversies have surrounded NFL Commissioner Roger Goodell, player conduct, and/or the league's role in player safety.

== 1925 NFL Championship ==
The 1925 NFL Championship, officially held by the Chicago Cardinals, has been the subject of controversy since it was awarded. Under the league rules during that time, the NFL title was automatically given to the team with the best record at the end of the season instead of having the winner be determined by a playoff tournament. There was an open-ended schedule during that season; although the final listed league games ended on December 6, teams could still schedule contests against each other through December 20 to make more money.

The Pottsville Maroons were one of the dominant teams of the 1925 season, and after defeating the Cardinals on December 6, came away with the best record in the league. However, NFL commissioner Joseph Carr suspended and removed the Maroons from the NFL after they played an unauthorized exhibition game in Philadelphia, on the grounds that they had violated the territorial rights of the Frankford Yellow Jackets. The Cardinals played and won two more games against weak NFL opponents, giving them a superior record, and were awarded the title.

Pottsville supporters argue that the suspension was illegitimate, and that the Maroons, who were reinstated the next year, would have had the superior record had they not been suspended. Others claim that Chicago was the legitimate champions based on the rules of the time. The NFL has investigated Pottsville's case on two occasions, both times upholding its decision that the Cardinals are the 1925 champions.

== Team relocation controversies ==
An NFL franchise is an asset to both the football fans in a region and the city the franchise represents. Having a team makes a large impact on a city's perceived status, entertainment and social opportunities, and ability to attract new business and corporations looking to establish a national or regional presence. While a team is able to make certain demands for facilities and incentives to remain in or relocate to a city, a city is also able to use the status conferred by the franchise to make itself considerably more attractive to corporations and the individuals who may choose to work there.

=== Baltimore Colts move to Indianapolis ===
The Baltimore Colts were moved to Indianapolis by owner Robert Irsay in 1984, after multiple years of lobbying to renovate or replace the decrepit Memorial Stadium, including talks of a "Baltodome". In 1982, the Hoosier Dome (later called the RCA Dome) was built in Indianapolis, increasing interest in a move by the Colts. Eventually, the Colts moved to Indianapolis with the help of the moving company Mayflower Transit, who did so at night to confuse the Maryland State Police and fans.

=== Cleveland Browns move to Baltimore ===
Cleveland Browns owner Art Modell decided to move the Browns to Baltimore, 12 years after the Colts moved away from the city. After backlash from the fans, the team and the NFL decided on a special compromise: Modell could relocate the Browns to Baltimore, but would play as an "expansion team", and the Browns would go into a state of "suspended operations". Modell's new team was eventually named the Baltimore Ravens. In 1999, the Cleveland Browns returned to the league as an expansion team. Similar agreements would eventually be used for the Seattle SuperSonics of the NBA in their relocation to Oklahoma City to become the Oklahoma City Thunder, along with the San Jose Earthquakes of the MLS in their move to become the Houston Dynamo (a new Earthquakes team eventually returned).

=== St. Louis Rams move to Los Angeles ===
On April 13, 1995, Stan Kroenke helped Georgia Frontiere move the Los Angeles Rams from Anaheim to St. Louis by purchasing a 30% share of the team.

In April 2010, as a majority stock holder, Kroenke said, "I'm going to attempt to do everything that I can to keep the Rams in St. Louis. Just as I did everything that I could to bring the team to St. Louis in 1995. I believe my actions speak for themselves."

In August 2010, Stan Kroenke purchased the Rams using a right of first refusal clause in the last minute of bidding, beating a high bid from Shahid Khan.

In February 2013, the Rams and the City of St. Louis went to arbitration over a clause in the Rams' lease that stated the Rams' current stadium must be in the top tier of NFL stadiums. The arbitrators agreed with the Rams, giving the Rams the ability to break their original lease and go to a year-to-year lease agreement. On January 5, 2015, it was announced that the Kroenke Group was teaming up with Stockbridge Capital Group to build a 70,000-seat NFL stadium and venue in Inglewood, California, a suburb of Los Angeles, threatening the Rams' future in St. Louis. In response, St. Louis countered with National Car Rental Field, a proposed open-air stadium in the north riverfront in downtown St. Louis, with the hope of the Rams staying in St. Louis. The fanbase in St. Louis felt it was not being treated fairly—in 2014 the St. Louis Rams had 86% attendance despite a 6-10 record and 10 prior years of non-win seasons, forcing fans and local sportswriters to question the integrity of the NFL and Kroenke for even considering the Los Angeles plans. St. Louis officials felt they were not receiving fair treatment either as Kroenke had no talks or discussions with city officials, who have expressed interest in keeping the team in St. Louis. In a radio interview, Kroenke was labeled as "enemy number one" in his home state due to his uncanny willingness to cooperate. NFL Commissioner Roger Goodell stated that St. Louis' funding plan did not meet the criteria set by the NFL because St. Louis offered a stadium plan lacking $100 million. On January 4, 2016, the team applied for relocation to Los Angeles for the 2016 NFL season. The following day, the Rams and Stan Kroenke released their proposal for relocation. Some of the Rams' conclusions were disputed by St. Louis mayor Francis Slay (in a letter to Roger Goodell), The St. Louis Regional Chamber, and Forbes.

On January 12, 2016, the NFL approved the Rams' application to relocate from St. Louis back to Los Angeles with a 30-2 vote, although the move was generally considered malicious by fans in St. Louis. The following day, officials were pondering Stan Kroenke's removal from the Missouri Sports Hall of Fame.

The initial $200 million as a standard part of the NFL's G4 stadium loan, plus the additional $100 million requested from St. Louis totaled $300 million which the NFL ultimately deemed inadequate, was then granted to Oakland and San Diego to attempt to maintain their respected teams.

On January 14, 2016, at a St. Louis Blues game, St. Louis Cardinals owner Bill DeWitt III and Blues owner Tom Stillman dropped a puck together to celebrate the "best sports city in America", as the crowd chanted "Kroenke sucks!"

It was reported by many sources that the Rams, although changing their name and city to Los Angeles, were still trying to get players to sign contracts with Missouri as the state of their employer, suspected in part with the relaxed Workers Rights laws in Missouri vs. the much stricter California laws. The NFL Players union has told all agents to not accept any contracts until the verbiage is changed for the Rams to be a California employer.

On March 14, 2016, prior St. Louis Rams COO Kevin Demoff, expressed gratitude for the St. Louis Rams going on a losing streak in 2015 to give the relocation team more time to calculate a move to LA quoted as saying, "we went on a four game losing streak in the middle of November. So, we went from being in the playoff hunt and having a seed to out of the playoff hunt. That allowed us to have more time to talk about this, to put things together." Demoff, who was born in Los Angeles, joined the St. Louis Rams in 2009 just weeks before Stan Kroenke gained majority control. Demoff also ran the Los Angeles Avengers, an Arena Football league in Los Angeles in the early 2000s. Demoff was quoted as saying, "the league has handed Stan and the Rams their greatest opportunity in the last two decades: entry into L.A." suggesting the league had a large role in the relocation process.

On April 12, 2017, it was reported that the City of St. Louis, St. Louis County, and the Regional Convention and Sports Complex Authority filed a lawsuit against the NFL and all 32 NFL clubs and club owners (including Stan Kroenke) seeking damages and restitution of profits. On November 24, 2021, after four years of litigation, it was announced that the NFL and the various St. Louis parties had agreed to a $790 million settlement to end the lawsuit.

== Team conduct ==
=== Washington Redskins/Commanders ===
In July 2020, The Washington Post published a series of articles alleging that over 40 women who were former employees of the then-Washington Redskins, including office workers and cheerleaders, had been sexually harassed and discriminated against by team owner Dan Snyder and other male executives, colleagues, and players of the team since at least 2006. That December, it was also reported that Snyder had settled a sexual harassment claim with a former female employee for a sum of $1.6 million. The alleged incident had occurred on his private plane while returning from the Academy of Country Music Awards in 2009. Two private investigations at the time, by the team and an outside law firm, failed to substantiate the woman's claim, and it was reported that Snyder paid the sum to avoid any negative publicity.

A year-long independent investigation into the team's workplace culture, led by lawyer Beth Wilkinson, was concluded in July 2021. It found that incidents of sexual harassment, bullying, and intimidation were commonplace throughout the organization under his ownership. The NFL fined the team $10 million in response, with Snyder also voluntarily stepping down from running the team's day-to-day operations for a few months, giving those responsibilities to his wife Tanya. On July 28, 2022, Snyder voluntarily testified before the United States House Committee on Oversight and Reform regarding its own investigation on Washington's history of workplace misconduct.

In October 2022, Washington DC’s attorney general filed a consumer protection lawsuit against the NFL and the Commanders, including Snyder. On December 8, 2022, following a 14 month probe, the House Committee on Oversight and Reform published a report which found that Snyder gave "misleading" answers when he testified about alleged controversies surrounding his team's workplace. The report also accused Snyder of paying former employees "hush money" so they wouldn't come forward with their allegations of abuse which included "sexual misconduct, exploitation of women, bullying of men and other inappropriate behavior," describing it as "commonplace, and that he was a hands-on owner who had a role in nearly every organizational decision.” The report also stated the NFL "has not protected workers from sexual harassment and abuse."

== Player conduct ==
In 2007, Roger Goodell became commissioner, and instituted a player conduct policy to help control off-field behavior by players. Goodell was criticized for stripping teams of draft picks and for punishing Adam Jones and Chris Henry, despite Adam Jones not being convicted.

The problem with the NFL's conduct policy is that it was designed not to halt off-field troubles as much as to squelch a looming public relations disaster that came after players like Tank Johnson and Pacman Jones were arrested two years ago. The policy was not an iron-clad set of rules and consequences but rather a fluid concept in which Commissioner Roger Goodell hands out punishment on a case-by-case basis.

— The Washington Post

=== Notable criminal NFL cases ===
- Jovan Belcher, murder
- Rae Carruth, conspiracy to commit murder
- Cecil Collins, burglary
- Mark Chmura, sexual assault (found not guilty)
- Jim Dunaway, murder
- Dwayne Goodrich, homicide
- Greg Hardy, domestic violence
- Thomas Henderson, sexual assault
- Darryl Henley, drug trafficking
- Travis Henry, drug trafficking
- Aaron Hernandez, murder
- Tyreek Hill, domestic violence
- Kareem Hunt, domestic violence
- Sam Hurd, drug trafficking
- Michael Irvin, sexual assault, drug possession (not proven guilty)
- Adam Jones, drug possession, illegal gambling, coercion, threat to life
- Ryan Leaf, burglary, drug trafficking
- Ray Lewis, murder (not proven guilty)
- Leonard Little, manslaughter by driving under the influence of alcohol
- Eric Naposki, murder
- Nate Newton, marijuana possession and trafficking
- Adrian Peterson, negligent injury to a child
- Lawrence Phillips, domestic violence, aggravated assault, criminal threat, illegal weapons, murder
- Ray Rice, domestic violence
- Robert Rozier, murder
- Henry Ruggs, DUI manslaughter (on going)
- Darrell Russell, substance abuse
- Darren Sharper, rape
- O. J. Simpson (several years after retirement from the NFL), double murder (not found guilty), aggravated assault, armed robbery, burglary, kidnapping, money laundering, drug possession
- Donté Stallworth, DUI manslaughter
- Michael Vick, illegal gambling, unlawful dog fighting, animal abuse
- Kellen Winslow II, rape, burglary
- Keith Wright, armed robbery, kidnapping, burglary

=== Minnesota Vikings boat party scandal ===
On Lake Minnetonka in 2005, 17 Minnesota Vikings players (Daunte Culpepper, Fred Smoot, Mewelde Moore, Pat Williams, Bryant McKinnie, Nate Burleson, Ralph Brown, Troy Williamson, Travis Taylor, Kevin Williams, Jermaine Wiggins, Lance Johnstone, Moe Williams, Ken Irvin, and Willie Offord) were accused of throwing a sex party on a boat, with most of the players partaking in sexual intercourse. Fred Smoot was allegedly the ringleader of the party, and allegedly pushed a double-headed dildo into the vaginas of two women who were lying on the floor in the lounge area. After one of them left the party, he continued to "manipulate the dildo" inside the other woman. Later, on October 19, 2005, Vikings owner Zygi Wilf, in a reportedly profanity-laced tirade, threatened to remove players from the roster who were involved in the planning of the party. Eventually, Culpepper, McKinnie, Smoot and Moe Williams were charged with indecent, disorderly, and lascivious conduct.

=== Michael Vick investigation ===
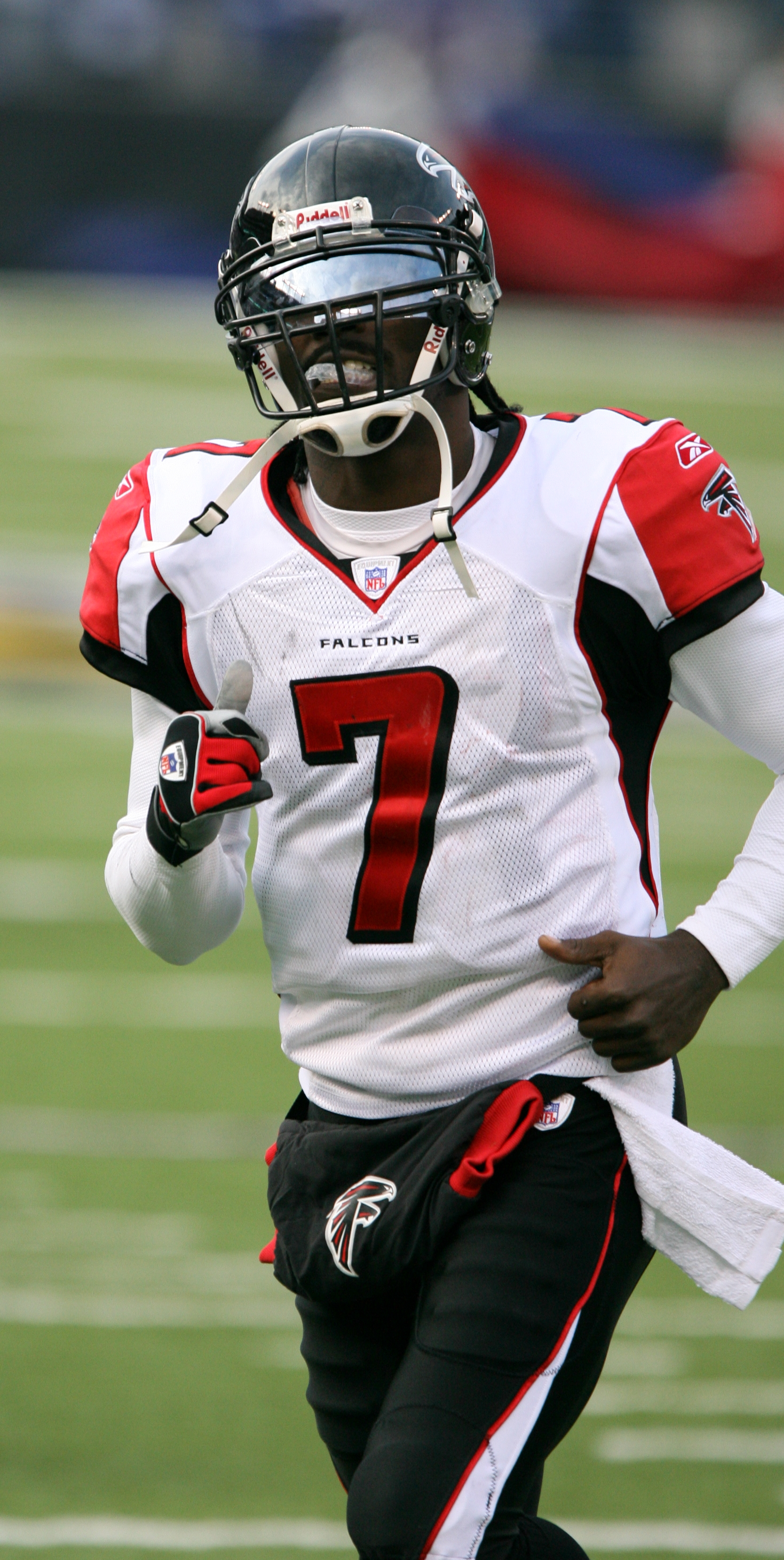
Investigators said that Michael Vick's dog fighting ring started in 2001 when he bought his house, and continued through 2007.

In 2006, Atlanta Falcons quarterback Michael Vick was involved in a dog fighting ring, and over seventy dogs, with most of them being pit bull terriers, with some said to be showing signs of injuries, were seized, along with physical evidence during several searches of Vick's 15-acre (61,000 m^{2}) property by local, state and federal authorities. During the investigation, Vick was revealed to be working with four others (Tony Taylor, Purnell Anthony Peace, Quanis Lavell Philips, and Oscar Allen). Eventually, they were convicted for "Conspiracy in interstate commerce/aid of unlawful animal cruelty venture". On September 13, Vick tested positive for marijuana, and was ordered by federal judge Henry E. Hudson to "submit to any method of testing required by the pretrial services officer or the supervising officer for determining whether the defendant is using a prohibited substance", and before getting sent to prison, Vick was placed under house arrest. After spending time at Northern Neck Regional Jail in Warsaw, Virginia, awaiting his trial, on December 10, Vick was given 23 months in federal prison, followed by 3 years of probation. Vick was later placed in United States Penitentiary, Leavenworth until 2009. Vick was later released by the Falcons, and signed with the Philadelphia Eagles.

=== Banned substances ===
Players' usage of steroids has been forbidden by the league since 1987, with players testing positive for performance-enhancing drugs being suspended without pay for four games for the first offense (a quarter of the regular season), eight games for a second offense (half of the regular season), and 12 months for a third offense. This policy has been praised by some and criticized by others. In 2006, former San Diego Chargers player Shawne Merriman tested positive for steroids, and was given a four-game suspension. The incident later led to the "Merriman Rule", forbidding players who tested positive for PEDs from participating in the Pro Bowl. Another popular drug in recent years amongst players has been the emergence of the amphetamine Adderall. Multiple players, particularly defensive backs, have been suspended for testing positive for the substance. Adderall is believed to heighten focus and attention and to allow for quicker thought and reaction time, potentially giving a player an advantage.

On December 27, 2015, Al Jazeera America released a report conducted by the Al Jazeera Investigative Unit investigating professional athletes' use of Performance-enhancing drugs (PEDs) which named Peyton Manning, among other prominent athletes, as having received illegal drugs from Charles Sly, a pharmacist who had worked at the Guyer Anti-Aging Clinic in Indianapolis during the fall of 2011. The report involved Liam Collins, a British hurdler, going undercover in an attempt to obtain banned substances from Sly and other medical professionals. The report claimed that Manning's wife, Ashley, had been shipped off-label human growth hormone (HGH) by the Guyer Institute during the fall of 2011 while Manning was out with a severe neck injury, with the intention of hiding that Manning was the one actually receiving the drugs. Al Jazeera reported on January 3, 2016, that they were in contact with a second source, who was "impeccably placed, knowledgeable [sic], and credible" and was a former employee at the Guyer Institute, which confirms Sly's allegation that HGH was sent to Ashley Manning. On February 5, 2016, it was confirmed that Ashley Manning did receive shipments from the Guyer Institute, but refused to confirm that the shipments had included HGH.

On July 25, 2016, the NFL claimed that it could not find 'credible evidence' that Manning used human growth hormone in violation of its policies.

=== Domestic violence ===
According to a database compiled by USA Today in 2014, 85 of the 713 arrests of NFL players since 2000 were due to domestic violence. On September 8, 2014, TMZ Sports released a video of Baltimore Ravens running back Ray Rice punching his fiancée and dragging her unconscious body out of an elevator led to a two-game suspension. Criticism of the league's policy towards domestic violence led the league to adopt six-game bans for violations of its domestic violence policy. Additional scrutiny was directed towards players who were convicted of domestic violence but were still allowed to play. Carolina Panthers defensive end Greg Hardy was accused of assaulting an ex-girlfriend in June 2014. He was disciplined by neither his team nor the NFL and has been allowed to continue playing. 16 female U.S. Senators (out of the 19 that were seated at that time) urged the league to adopt a zero tolerance policy towards domestic violence. Shortly after the aforementioned incidents, there were a number of PSAs led by NOMORE.org and over a dozen former and current NFL players that aired during NFL games. The purpose of the PSAs were to promote the NOMORE.org campaign of saying no more to domestic violence and raising awareness about the problems surrounding domestic violence.

=== Player politics ===
The NFL has received polarized opinions related to certain political agendas. For example:

- The NFL denied the Dallas Cowboys request to honor fallen police officers in wake of the 2016 shooting of Dallas police officers.
- In 2016, San Francisco 49ers quarterback Colin Kaepernick kneeled during the national anthem in protest of police violence, which led to widespread controversy surrounding the national anthem. During the 2016 season and onward, many NFL players from all 32 NFL teams protested during the national anthem due to police brutality, racial inequality, and other controversies around the nation surrounding politics and authority. Players have knelt, sat, stayed in the locker rooms, and raised their fists while the national anthem was played before kickoffs of games. Many videos on YouTube showed fans showing their anger towards players by burning merchandise such as hats, jerseys, and pictures. Aside from the NFL, other sports leagues have joined in the protests. Ultimately, in 2018, the NFL introduced a policy revolving around the issue.
- The NFL initially stated they would fine players for wearing September 11 attacks tribute cleats, which was ultimately never enacted due to backlash.

=== Sexual assault lawsuits ===
There have been several cases of high-profile sexual assault lawsuits filed against prominent NFL players. These lawsuits have varied in severity of accusation, settlement and punishment, both in court and from the league.

==== Peyton Manning ====
In 1996, while attending the University of Tennessee, quarterback Peyton Manning was accused of sexual assault by trainer Jamie Ann Naughright of pressing his genitals against Naughright's face during a foot examination. Manning claims that he was just pulling a prank by "mooning" another athlete in the room as Naughright bent over to examine him. Both Naughright and the other athlete deny Manning's story. Naughright settled with the university for $300,000 for its alleged failure in four incidents, and resigned from the school. She had initially made a list of 33 complaints about the school. Naughright filed a defamation lawsuit against Peyton Manning and three other parties in 2002. Manning allegedly defamed her in a book he wrote with his father and author John Underwood. The lawsuit was settled after the court ruled there was sufficient evidence for it to be heard by a jury. Terms of the settlement were not disclosed due to confidentiality terms.

==== Ben Roethlisberger ====
In 2009 and 2010, Steelers quarterback Ben Roethlisberger was accused by two women of sexual assault in separate lawsuits, one in Nevada and the other in the state of Georgia. While the first case was muddled with evidence of the accuser bragging of having consensual sex with Roethlisberger prior to filing suit, the second case in Georgia was left open with conflicting accounts of the victim's testimony and that of law enforcement and Roethlisberger. Though no criminal charges were ultimately brought up in either case against him, Roethlisberger was nonetheless suspended for the first six (later four) games of the 2010 season for violating the NFL player conduct policy and ordered to undergo a league-mandated "professional behavior evaluation" and "must adhere to any counseling or treatment that is recommended by the professional evaluators."

==== Deshaun Watson ====
On March 16, 2021, a Houston massage therapist filed a civil lawsuit delivered by attorney Tony Buzbee against Texans' quarterback Deshaun Watson, claiming that Watson had touched her with the tip of his erect penis while asking her for sex during a visit to her home for treatment in March 2020. Watson vehemently denied Buzbee's claims, stating that "I have never treated any woman with anything other than the utmost respect." According to the suit, the massage therapist immediately ended the session and cried after the incident. Several weeks later, two additional NFL players contacted the massage therapist on Watson's recommendation. The suit also claims that Watson later reached out to the massage therapist and apologized for his actions.

The next day, another massage therapist represented by Buzbee claimed that Watson had met her at the Houstonian Hotel in August 2020 and completely undressed and refused to cover up, directing her to massage his anus and penis and making a movement that caused her to touch his penis. The therapist also claims that Watson had only paid her half of the charges due for her services.

On March 18, 2021, a third civil lawsuit was filed against Watson, alleging that he had forced a massage therapist to perform oral sex on him before she blacked out in an office building in December 2020. The therapist claims that after Watson left, she was shaken and defecated on herself. Also on March 18, the NFL announced that it would investigate the sexual assault allegations made against Watson.

On March 19, 2021, Buzbee claimed that nine more civil suits had been filed against Watson (for a total of 12) and that 22 women contacted his office regarding Watson's conduct while receiving massages. Buzbee requested that the Houston Police Department (HPD) and the Harris County district attorney investigate the situation and pursue criminal charges against Watson. One of the nine new civil suits alleges that Watson attempted to forcibly kiss a woman, and another suit alleges that he had attempted to assault the same woman on two separate occasions.

On March 22, 2021, a 14th lawsuit was filed by a woman who called Watson a "serial predator". The incident allegedly took place in California, just the second of the 14 allegations to take place outside the Houston area. The traveling massage therapist alleged that when she arrived at the address that Watson had provided, he led her to a room and "locked the doors behind him." After Watson allegedly "forced Plaintiff's hand onto his penis" during the massage, he allegedly told her, "I will not have you sign an NDA but don't ever talk about this." The plaintiff also alleges that Watson reached out on Instagram in December "acting as if nothing had happened."

As of April 5, 2021, 22 lawsuits have been filed against Watson, though 18 professional massage therapists have since expressed support of his character, saying that the allegations contradict their experiences with Watson.

Buzbee has since reversed his stance on sending evidence to the Houston Police Department because Watson's lawyer Rusty Hardin has a son in the police force, instead alleging to send evidence from his clients "elsewhere" while also criticizing outgoing HPD chief Art Acevedo. Hardin and Acevedo have since criticized Buzbee's statements, with Hardin saying that he and his client would "always remain available to any law enforcement or regulatory agency who desires our cooperation." On April 2, the HPD announced an investigation of Watson after a complainant filed an official report. On April 6, two of the 22 women who had filed lawsuits against Watson publicly identified themselves at a press conference.

Ashley Solis, the first woman to identify herself, claimed that during a massage appointment at her home, Watson exposed himself and touched her hand with his erect penis before she ended the session and asked him to leave her home. At a press conference, Solis said that she suffers from panic attacks, anxiety and depression resulting from the sexual assault. She stated: "People say that I'm doing this just for money. That is false. I come forward now so that Deshaun Watson does not assault another woman."

On April 7, 2021, Nike and Beats By Dre suspended endorsement deals with Watson. Reliant Energy and H-E-B stated that they did not plan on engaging with Watson in the future.

Two days later, Hardin claimed that some of Watson's massages did lead to some "sexual activity" but that it was consensual. That same day, two judges ruled that 13 of the 22 lawsuits must be refiled within two business days or risk dismissal and that four of the accusers must refile using their current names. Attorneys announced that nine of the 12 women would reveal their names voluntarily. The judge granted Watson's attorneys' emergency motion requiring the release of the other accusers' names.

== Coaching controversies ==
=== Bounty Bowl ===
In 1989, NFC East division rivals, the Philadelphia Eagles and the Dallas Cowboys played two games with the first one being the annual Thanksgiving Day game. Later, it was discovered that Eagles head coach Buddy Ryan had placed a bounty on Cowboys and former Eagles kicker Luis Zendejas. Concerns first came around when Ryan was the defensive coordinator for the Chicago Bears, who allegedly pooled money into a bag, and if any of the Bears defensive players injures a player, he would get the bag. Suspicions started in the Thanksgiving Day game when various fights happened between the two teams, with Zendejas leaving the game with a concussion from a hard tackle by linebacker Jessie Small after a kickoff. After the game, Cowboys coach Jimmy Johnson alleged that Ryan had placed a bounty on two players: Zendejas and quarterback Troy Aikman, with injuring Aikman being worth possibly $500. However, Ryan dismissed the claims as "high school Charlie stuff". Zendejas later claimed that when he was with the Eagles, a player had once received at least $100–200 each for hits on a kicker and punter, which was the reason why Johnson made the accusation.

In the teams' second meeting, this time in Veterans Stadium in Philadelphia, the original game set the tone for the second game, especially with NFL commissioner Paul Tagliabue at the game. Because the snow at the game has yet to be removed, the Eagles' notoriously rowdy fans, with a mixture of beer, the snow, the bounty and the hatred for "America's Team", threw everything within reach at various targets, like back judge Al Jury, who was knocked to the ground by a barrage of snowballs; Cowboys punter Mike Saxon, who was targeted in the end zone; and Johnson, who was hit with snowballs, ice, and beer as he was escorted off the field by Philadelphia police. The Eagles won both contests, winning the first game 27–0, and the second 20–10. Philadelphia ultimately made the playoffs as a Wild Card team with an 11-5 record while Dallas finished 1-15 with the worst record in the league.

=== Spygate ===
Dubbed Spygate, in 2007, despite the New England Patriots going 16–0 for the first time in league history, the team was still in the midst of a controversy surrounding head coach Bill Belichick. In the early part of the season, the Patriots were caught videotaping the hand signals of a New York Jets coach from a non-fixed roof covered position, and Belichick was fined a league-high $500,000, and the Patriots were fined $250,000. Additionally, the Patriots lost their first-round pick in the 2008 NFL draft (if they made the playoffs), or their second- and third-round picks (if they missed the playoffs). In a widely criticized move, the league destroyed the tapes. However, Belichick and most other coaches were then revealed to have done this in the past until it was stopped by memo from Roger Goodell. Belichick's stance was that the rule does not allow videotaping from a mobile camera and the information then used in the same game. The NFL found that Belichick did not use the tape during the same game, yet penalized him more than any other coach in history. From an unknown source, the Boston Herald published an article stating that Belichick had done this practice with the St. Louis Rams practice before Super Bowl XXXVI, an allegation that Belichick denied. The Boston Herald later printed a retraction to the story, stating that they had been given "bad information". In a statement from Mike Martz, the St. Louis Rams ex-offensive coordinator and coach also recalls that Goodell asked him to write a statement, saying that he was satisfied with the NFL's Spygate investigation and was certain the Patriots had not cheated and asking everyone to move on—like leaders of the Steelers and Eagles had done. A congressional inquiry that would put league officials under oath had to be avoided, Martz recalls Goodell telling him. "If it ever got to an investigation, it would be terrible for the league," Goodell said.

=== Bountygate ===
In 2012, the New Orleans Saints were discovered to have run a "slush fund" under former defensive coordinator Gregg Williams, that paid out bonuses, called "bounties", to purposely injure offensive players that the Saints were playing against. The system was known to have operated during Williams's time in Buffalo and Washington. Rumors started in 2009 during the Saints' Super Bowl XLIV run in the 2009 NFC Championship game against the Minnesota Vikings, where the Saints defense was allegedly trying to hurt Vikings quarterback Brett Favre. Other than the Vikings, the Saints also allegedly targeted Chicago Bears and Carolina Panthers players, and the program became even more notorious in the 2011 NFC Divisional Playoff Game against the San Francisco 49ers, when filmmaker Sean Pamphilon released audio tapes of Williams telling his players to injure a select group of 49ers, one of them being running back Kendall Hunter, and to knock him out, as well as going after Kyle Williams because of his history of concussions. Williams also told them to injure Vernon Davis' ankles and tear wide receiver Michael Crabtree's ACL. According to Pamphilon, Williams also appeared to put a bounty on quarterback Alex Smith after he told his men to hit Smith in the chin, "then he rubs his thumb against his index and middle fingers—the cash sign—and says, 'I got the first one. I got the first one. Go get it. Go lay that motherfucker out.'"

Ultimately, Goodell handed down one of the harshest penalties in league history, by suspending Williams indefinitely, head coach Sean Payton for the 2012 season, interim head coach Joe Vitt for the first six games, and general manager Mickey Loomis for eight games. Saints linebacker Jonathan Vilma was also suspended for the season, as well as defensive linemen Anthony Hargrove and Will Smith for eight and four games, respectively. Former Saints and then Cleveland Browns linebacker Scott Fujita was also suspended for three games. The players' suspensions were later thrown out on appeal.

== Player safety ==
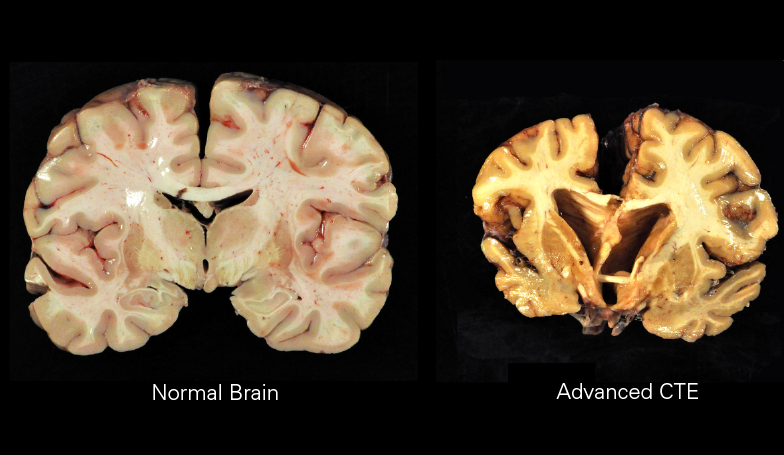
Healthy brain (left) and brain with stage IV CTE (right)

There has been widespread controversy over the league's part in player safety. Goodell has fined Lions player Ndamukong Suh for stomping, as well as Steelers linebacker James Harrison for a hard tackle, as well as suspending the two players.

The league has also been criticized for its efforts in preventing concussions, in which eight former players have died, and have also had concussions throughout their careers. In 1994, former commissioner Paul Tagliabue created the Mild Traumatic Brain Injury Committee in order to study the effects of concussions on players. With the suicide of linebacker Junior Seau in 2012, concerns arose about the connection between player deaths and concussions. As a result, on April 9, 2013, a lawsuit involving 4,100 plaintiffs and 222 consolidated lawsuits against the NFL was held by a federal court.

In 2005, pathologist Bennet Omalu found evidence of chronic traumatic encephalopathy (CTE) in the brain of former Pittsburgh Steelers player Mike Webster. The NFL initially hounded Omalu and tried to force him to withdraw his findings. Since this discovery, however, CTE has been found in 345 of 376 former NFL players' brains, according to a 2023 report by the Boston University CTE Center, which has led the effort to diagnose CTE cases. In comparison, a 2018 BU study of the general population found only one CTE case in 164 autopsies, and that one person with CTE had played college football.

Also, in recent years, the number of ACL tears and other serious knee injuries has gone up, including in 2013 an increase of 64 percent from 2011.

== Washington Redskins and Kansas City Chiefs team names ==
The Washington Redskins were subject to dispute with some in the Native American community for many years claiming the term "redskin" to be derogatory towards Native Americans. However, in 2020, in the wake of the George Floyd Protests, Washington announced that the name "Redskins" would be retired. As a result, the team was to be identified as the Washington Football Team until a new name was chosen. The team was eventually renamed the Commanders.

Similarly, there have been calls from the National Congress of American Indians (NCAI) and the Kansas City Indian Center for the Kansas City Chiefs to change their mascot and stop the stereotypical "tomahawk chop."

== Free agency ==
The league's free agency system originally used a system that was adopted from Major League Baseball, where a player stays with a team until his contract expires, then can negotiate with the team to stay. In 1947, the league adopted the 1-year system, where a team can only renew a player's contract for one year. In 1963, the "Rozelle Rule" was created, where a team that signs a player must compensate for the player's expenses from his previous team. If a team refuses, commissioner Rozelle decided the compensation. The players union found this system to be unfair, and eventually won a court action in 1976. However, the league's collective bargaining agreement still kept the compensation rule, but removed Rozelle's authority. Ultimately, in 1987, the players union went on strike. Two years later, the union sued again, but was prohibited from suing the league for anti-trust. From 1989 to 1992, instead of the current free agent system, the league used a system to acquire and release players called Plan B free agency. The system consisted of teams protecting 37 players, and having the remaining players becoming unrestricted free agents. The players eventually decertified the union, leading to players filing individual lawsuits. However, eight players sued the league for violating their antitrust laws, and calling the system an unfair trade restraint. The system ultimately was deemed illegal by the jury, and was ended in 1992. The lawsuit eventually led to the establishment of the current system, which involves the use of a salary cap.

=== 2011 lockout ===
In 2011, the league and the National Football League Players Association eventually failed to arrive at a consensus for the collective bargaining agreement (CBA), and eventually led to the lockout on March 12. The lockout threatened to cancel games, even though only the Pro Football Hall of Fame Game was cancelled. The lockout eventually ended on July 21 with a new CBA.

== Referee labor dispute ==
In 2012, the league and the NFL Referees Association (NFLRA) became involved in a dispute over the collective bargaining agreement between the two parties. Eventually, the league then locked out the officials in June, and turned to replacement officials to officiate the games. A month later, the association filed a complaint to the National Labor Relations Board against the league for unfair labor practices. The replacement referees were met with criticism from fans, players and coaches. Incidents included the week one Seattle Seahawks–Arizona Cardinals game, where the Seahawks were given an extra timeout, week two where side judge Brian Stropolo was removed from the New Orleans Saints–Carolina Panthers game for being a Saints fan, and the controversial ending to the Green Bay Packers-Seattle Seahawks game in week three. In late September, ESPN analyst Chris Mortensen announced that the two groups reached an agreement.

== Controversial calls ==
The league has been criticized for various calls that would later be disputed, and would also lead to a segment on NFL Top 10 called Top Ten Most Controversial Calls. Some of these controversial calls have directly led to rule changes.

=== Immaculate Reception ===
In the 1972 AFC divisional game, the Pittsburgh Steelers and Oakland Raiders fought to a 7–6 lead for Oakland. With 22 seconds left in the game, Steelers quarterback Terry Bradshaw heaved a pass towards John Fuqua, and Raiders safety Jack Tatum collided with Fuqua at the same time as the ball's arrival. Tatum's hit knocked Fuqua down and the ball flying backwards. Steelers running back Franco Harris, who had been heading downfield in the event that Bradshaw needed another receiver, caught the ball before it hit the ground and ran for the game-winning touchdown. However, fans and critics eventually asked the question: Whom did the ball touch in the Tatum/Fuqua collision? If it hit only Fuqua, the pass would have been illegal under the rules at the time, and Oakland would have won; if it hit Tatum, or both Fuqua and Tatum (in any order), it would have been legal. The rule stated that once an offensive player touches a pass, he is the only offensive player that can catch the pass. However, if a defensive player touches the pass "first, or simultaneously with or subsequent to its having been touched by only one [offensive] player, then all [offensive] players become and remain eligible" to catch the pass.

=== Holy Roller ===
In 1978, the Oakland Raiders were trailing the San Diego Chargers 20–14 with 10 seconds left in the game. Raiders quarterback Ken Stabler took the snap, and saw Chargers linebacker Woodrow Lowe about to sack him. Stabler eventually deliberately fumbled the ball towards San Diego's goal line, where running back Pete Banaszak attempted to recover, but lost his footing and sent the ball closer to the end zone. Tight end Dave Casper attempted to pick it up, but was unable to, and kicked the ball into the end zone, where he recovered it for the game-tying touchdown. This later led to disputes over whether or not Banaszak and Casper intentionally batted the ball forward, which would be a penalty, as well as whether or not Stabler fumbled the ball or threw a forward pass. The play was eventually ruled as legal. The Raiders would then make the extra point to win 21–20. In the ensuing off-season, the league enacted the so-called "Ken Stabler Rule": on fourth down at any time in the game or any down in the final two minutes of a half, if a player fumbles forward, only the fumbling player can recover and/or advance the ball. If that player's teammate recovers the ball, it is placed back at the spot of the fumble.

=== 1979 AFC Championship ===
Against the Pittsburgh Steelers in the 1979 AFC Championship Game, the Houston Oilers fell behind 17–10 late in the third quarter. Oilers quarterback Dan Pastorini then threw a pass to wide receiver Mike Renfro, who caught the ball in the back of the end zone. However, though television networks proved that Renfro was inbounds, instant replay was not in use at the time, and the officials ultimately ruled Renfro out of bounds. The Steelers would then score another touchdown and go to Super Bowl XIV. The league would not institute instant replay until 1986.

=== Music City Miracle ===
The Tennessee Titans and Buffalo Bills squared off in the 1999 AFC Wild Card Game, and the Bills led 16–15 with 16 seconds left in the game. After Bills kicker Steve Christie kicked off to Titans returner Lorenzo Neal, Neal handed the ball to Frank Wycheck, who then threw a lateral across the field to Kevin Dyson, who then ran 75 yards for a touchdown and the lead. This then led to officials debating over whether or not Wycheck's pass was a forward pass or a lateral. Referee Phil Luckett then deemed the pass a lateral, giving Tennessee the win. Tennessee ultimately advanced to Super Bowl XXXIV where Dyson came within one yard of tying the game on the super bowl's final play.

=== Bert Emanuel ===
In the 1999 NFC Championship Game, the Tampa Bay Buccaneers trailed the St. Louis Rams by 5 points. With 47 seconds left in the game, Buccaneers quarterback Shaun King threw an 11-yard pass to Bert Emanuel, who caught the ball, but had the play overturned after the ball touched the ground. The Rams would go on to win the game and advance to Super Bowl XXXIV. The league then enacted the "Bert Emanuel Rule" after the season: 'the ball can touch the ground during a completed pass as long as the receiver maintains control of the ball.'

=== Bottlegate ===
In a 2001 regular-season game between the Cleveland Browns and Jacksonville Jaguars, the Browns were driving down the field for a potential game-winning touchdown in order to keep their playoff hopes alive. After Browns quarterback Tim Couch passed to receiver Quincy Morgan to convert a crucial fourth down, the catch appeared to be bobbled but the officials initially ruled a completion. Couch then spiked the ball with 48 seconds remaining, but the officials subsequently reviewed the previous play and overturned it, despite a rule that stipulated that a play cannot be reviewed after another play has been completed. The controversial decision, which effectively sealed the outcome of the game and eliminated the Browns from the playoffs, angered Browns fans, who started tossing plastic beer bottles onto the field and forced the officials to declare the game over until the league office called and ordered the final 48 seconds, which consisted of two kneeldowns by the Jaguars, to be played. According to Browns fans, the team got off a play before the review, but it is very likely the replay official requested the review before the spike.

=== Tuck Rule ===
During a 2001 AFC playoff game between the New England Patriots and Oakland Raiders, the Raiders forced a fumble near the end of the game. The Raiders recovered the fumble, thereby securing their victory. However, the call went into review by the booth, and upon review it was determined to be an incomplete pass due to the tuck rule being applied. Under the rule, if a passer "is holding the ball to pass it forward, any intentional forward movement of his arm starts a forward pass, even if the player loses possession of the ball as he is attempting to tuck it back toward his body." The Patriots went on to win the game and ultimately Super Bowl XXXVI. Fans and experts alike have disputed whether the call was correct, and whether the rule should even exist. The tuck rule was later abolished in 2013.

=== 2002 NFC Wild Card Game ===
During the NFC wild card game between the San Francisco 49ers and New York Giants, the Giants created a first half lead, which the 49ers overcame by scoring 25 points. Late in the game, the Giants, down by one point, attempted to kick the game-winning field goal with six seconds left. However, long snapper Trey Junkin botched the snap, leading to holder Matt Allen to throw a desperation pass to Rich Seubert, which fell incomplete, giving San Francisco the win. During the play, a penalty was called, but on New York for having an illegal man downfield. However, Seubert had reported as an eligible receiver, but a different Giants player was illegally downfield. The 49ers would also have been penalized for pass interference on defensive end Chike Okeafor for pulling down Seubert, which was not called. Had both penalties been called, the Giants would have gotten another chance at the game winning field goal.

=== Super Bowl XL ===
In Super Bowl XL, the Seattle Seahawks were denied a touchdown when officials called penalized Seahawks receiver Darrell Jackson for "pushing off" against Pittsburgh Steelers safety Chris Hope during Jackson's touchdown reception in the first quarter. In the second quarter, Steelers quarterback Ben Roethlisberger scored on a quarterback sneak, and Seattle challenged the call, claiming that Roethlisberger did not break the plane of the end zone, but the play was confirmed after a review. In the fourth quarter, Seahawks tackle Sean Locklear was penalized for holding Steelers linebacker Clark Haggans during a long pass. Seahawks quarterback Matt Hasselbeck was also penalized for allegedly making an illegal block below the waist during Ike Taylor's interception return. The Steelers would go on to win 21–10. Four years later, referee Bill Leavy issued an apology to the Seahawks.

=== 2012 Packers–Seahawks game ===
On September 24, 2012, the Green Bay Packers faced the Seattle Seahawks on Monday Night Football. With the NFL and the league's regular referees locked in a contract dispute, replacement officials were acquired to call the games for the first 3 weeks. As in previous games, there were many questionable calls made by the replacement officials during the game. In the 4th quarter, with only 8 seconds left in the game, the Packers were winning 12–7, with the Seahawks inside the 30-yard line, with one last play to decide the game. Seahawks quarterback Russell Wilson threw a Hail Mary pass to the end zone. The pass ended up being caught by both Seahawks receiver Golden Tate and Packers defensive back M. D. Jennings. The two officials standing near the play each made their own call of the play. One official seemed to raise his arms to signal a Packers interception, while the other official raised his arms to signal a Seahawks touchdown. As with new NFL rules on instant replay, all touchdowns were liable to official review. The play was reviewed, while the Seahawks crowded the field in celebration. After a few minutes, full of controversy, the officials declared the play's ruling stood as a Seahawks touchdown, giving Seattle a 14–12 win.

Almost instantly, controversy reigned as replays showed that before the catch, Tate pushed off Packers defender Sam Shields, but the officials missed an offensive pass interference penalty call on Tate that would have disallowed the score and ensured a Packers victory. As pass interference is not reviewable, the replay officials (who were not replacements) could only review the simultaneous catch ruling. After they upheld the simultaneous possession as a completion in favor of the Seahawks, the controversy surrounding the play led to a plausible disdain from not only irate Packers fans but also NFL fans in general. It was reported that in the hours after the game, the NFL commissioner's office received over 70,000 voice-mails regarding the play. The controversy even drew remarks from people outside of football, as basketball player LeBron James and professional golfer Bubba Watson both sent messages via Twitter giving their own criticism on the play. NASCAR driver Dale Earnhardt Jr. stated that the season had been "stained in a way that's irreparable". The lockout ended with an agreement and the regular officials made their return at the start of Week 4 in a Thursday night game between the Cleveland Browns and Baltimore Ravens in Baltimore.

=== 2018 NFC Championship ===
The 2018 NFC Championship between the Los Angeles Rams and New Orleans Saints involved a controversial call in which Rams defender Nickell Robey-Coleman collided with Tommylee Lewis of the Saints on a pass from Drew Brees late in the game. Robey-Coleman was not flagged on the play, but several commentators and Saints fans complained that one should have been thrown for pass interference on Robey-Coleman. Had the penalty been thrown, the Saints would have been given a fresh set of downs and would have been able to run the clock down to the final seconds to be in position to kick the game-winning field goal. Instead, the Saints kicked the field goal from there to go ahead 23–20 with a little under two minutes to go. The Rams kicked a field goal to tie the game in regulation time and send it into overtime, where they would win 26–23 on another field goal following a Brees interception.

The no-call was instantly criticized and is widely considered one of the worst officiating decisions in NFL history. Saints head coach Sean Payton claimed to have received a call immediately after the game from the league office admitting a penalty should have been called. The NFL came under fire for its rule surrounding pass interference penalties, which were not subject to replay review. The day after the game, an online petition was filed by Saints fans to convince the NFL to replay the final couple of minutes because of the incident. Another day later, the Saints filed a lawsuit against the NFL due to the call. All arguments about the call fell on deaf ears, and the Rams went on to Super Bowl LIII, where they lost 13–3 to the New England Patriots. Following the backlash, the NFL instituted replay review for pass interference for the 2019 season. However, the rule was not retained for the 2020 season after many coaches felt the rule only created more confusion.

== Deflategate ==
On January 18, 2015, the New England Patriots defeated the Indianapolis Colts 45–7 in the AFC Championship Game. Prior to and during the game, the Colts accused the Patriots of underinflating their footballs. Following a five-month investigation, the NFL announced on May 11, 2015, that quarterback Tom Brady would be suspended without pay for four games of the upcoming NFL season for being generally aware that someone deflated some of the balls after the referee tested them. The rules at the time called for a warning to be issued and a possible fine for this infraction. If a player continued, after being warned, to break this rule during the game, the player was to be thrown out of the game. The Patriots were also fined $1 million and were forced to forfeit their first round selection in the 2016 NFL draft and their fourth round selection in the 2017 NFL draft.

On May 14, 2015, the National Football League Players Association (NFLPA) filed an appeal of Brady's four-game suspension, but on July 28 the NFL announced his suspension was upheld.

After NFL commissioner Roger Goodell upheld the suspension in an internal appeal, a federal court case on the matter was started. On September 3, 2015, Judge Richard M. Berman ruled to vacate Goodell's four game suspension of Brady, due to absence of "...the requisites of fairness and due process." On April 25, 2016, the United States Court of Appeals for the Second Circuit overturned Judge Berman's decision to vacate Brady's suspension by a 2–1 majority. After the en banc petition was rejected, Brady announced he will not pursue further appeals.

== NFL on television ==
The NFL's status as a prime offering by the networks has led some to conclude that unbiased coverage of the league is not possible, although this may be true of most sports. However, with the current concentration of media ownership in the United States, the league essentially has broadcast contracts with four media companies (Paramount Global, Comcast, Fox Corporation, and The Walt Disney Company) that own a combined vast majority of the American broadcast and cable networks.

=== ESPN ===
In 2011, ESPN agreed to a deal with the NFL worth more than $15 billion. This fact led several media organizations, including Forbes, to argue whether the financial relationship with the league creates a conflict of interest when ESPN covers the NFL.

For example, ESPN attempted to run a dramatic series showing steamier aspects of pro football, Playmakers, but canceled the series after the league reportedly threatened to exclude the network from the next set of television contracts. The network also withdrew its partnership with the PBS series Frontline on the 2013 documentary "League of Denial", which chronicles the history of head injuries in the NFL, shortly after a meeting between ESPN executives and league commissioner Roger Goodell took place in New York City, though ESPN denies pressure from the NFL led to its backing out of the project, claiming a lack of editorial control instead.

Then in July 2015, The Hollywood Reporter reported that sources within ESPN believed that the NFL gave them a "terrible" 2015 Monday Night Football schedule as "payback" for remarks made on air by both ESPN commentators Keith Olbermann and Bill Simmons that were critical of the league and Goodell; ESPN parted ways with both Olbermann and Simmons during that same year.

=== 2016 NFL ratings ===
The NFL has been a long-standing powerhouse in the television and advertising marketplace, but since about the beginning of the 2016 season, the NFL's ratings have begun to drop. Speculation about the unexpected rating drops covers a myriad of possibilities, including:

- the above-mentioned problems with concussions and off-field player conduct (the latter being a problem that has also plagued the NBA)
- reduced feelings of authentic competition due to rapidly-increasing number of penalties called per game
- perceived lackluster matchups
- the above-mentioned problems with politics. The 2016 US Presidential elections were a particular sore point with fans, with some of Super Bowl LI's commercials in particular having drawn backlash.

The loss in viewership is potentially worrisome for the larger networks that are spending roughly $5 billion for football rights through the 2021 season.

Some news agencies suggested the decline in viewership was primarily about the recent protest by some players of the US anthem. In a memo leaked on Twitter to NFL organizations, NFL leadership addressed this concern, stating that they saw "no evidence that concern over player protests during the National Anthem is having any material impact on our ratings."

=== Increased penalties and ratings ===
The NFL has seen a vast increase in penalties called per game and total penalty yards per game. From 2009 to 2016 penalties per game increased by 20%. Through week 1 of the 2018 regular season, penalties are up another 19% vs 2017. Week one of the 2018 NFL season saw the second-most accepted penalties called of any single week in the past 10 years with 255 called, an increase of 35% per game from the previous season. Complaints about increased changes in the rulebook making the rules too convoluted to understand and reducing the perceived quality of competition have colored the media surrounding the 2018 NFL season particularly.

== See also ==
- List of suspensions in the NFL
- List of organizational conflicts in the NFL
- NBA criticisms and controversies
- Health issues in American football
  - List of NFL players with chronic traumatic encephalopathy
- List of largest NFL trades
