= Timeline of the Bad Newz Kennels dog fighting investigation =

== 2007 ==
- April 20 – Vick's cousin and cook, Davon T. Boddie, 26, is arrested for narcotics in Hampton on charges of distribution of marijuana and possession with intent to distribute outside Royal Suite, a nightclub. He gave Vick's property address at 1915 Moonlight Road. Smithfield, Virginia (located in Surry County) as his residence.
- April 25 – Police conducted a search of home and land at 1915 Moonlight Road in southeastern Surry County and discovered evidence of a possible dog fighting operation. Potential evidence included blood spatter on the second floor of one of the outbuildings, dog treadmills and scales, a pry bar used to open a dog's mouth and an apparatus used for breeding, known as a Rape Rack. With the help of animal control officials from several localities called to the scene, they removed 66 dogs, 55 of them pit bulls, and seized equipment and some physical evidence.
- April 27 – ESPN reports that, even though Vick denies this, neighbors have reported seeing Vick in town from time to time and clerks at a nearby store have reported Vick buying nutritional supplies for dogs. Authorities told the news media that, although some equipment could be used in legitimate dog-breeding, there also was a "pry bar" used to pry apart a dog's jaws in dog fighting, and bloodstained carpeting on the floor of a room inside the home above the garage.

- Appearing at a news conference to announce his participation in the NFL Quarterback Challenge, Vick described himself as an unwitting victim of family.

- Late April/early May – Vick listed the house and property with a real estate brokerage at approximately 50% of the assessed value. Within a few days, the house was under a sales contract. As of June 8, no sale had been made official, according to the county clerk's office where deeds and transfers of real estate are recorded.
- May 3 – The Humane Society of the United States called upon the NFL in a letter to take a serious look at the problem of players' involvement with dog fighting.
- May 24 – Surry County prosecutor Gerald L. Poindexter said he still didn't have solid evidence linking Vick to dog fighting because there were no eyewitnesses who say they saw dog fighting at the home. He said he was proceeding very carefully with this case; Poindexter had another dog fighting case a few years back and lost it because of an illegal search.
- May 25 – Poindexter said he was confident charges will be brought in the case but can't yet say who will be charged.
- May 27 – ESPN reported that a confidential source, identified as a man who has been involved in dog fighting for over 30 years, claimed that Vick was one of the "heavyweights" in the dog fighting world, and was poised to tell ESPN's Outside the Lines about the time in 2000 when his dog squared off against a dog owned by Vick. The man claimed that Vick would bet large dollar amounts on fights, up to $40,000.
- May 31 – Poindexter told ESPN that he recently received a call from a person he deemed credible and that the informant gave him information regarding the ongoing investigation. "We have people who are volunteering to make those allegations," Poindexter said. Asked whether there was evidence that placed Vick at dog fights, Poindexter said, "Yes...If he did anything, he won't get away with it, if we can prove it. But it's not easy," Poindexter said. ..."we're moving carefully, slowly...to build a strong case."

- In the same news item, it was reported that ESPN's sources, said to be close to law enforcement, cautioned that, based on the current evidence, it might be difficult to successfully prosecute Vick. "There is probably enough there to bring a bill [of indictment]," one source said, "but how some of [the evidence] would play out at trial, or if it even reached a trial ... I just don't know. These kinds of prosecutions are tough. There are some holes, definitely, and that's why [investigators] are digging for more information. You want more than just smoke. You're always looking for the smoking gun."

- June 6 – Newport News Daily Press newspaper reported that Sheriff H.D. Brown had an investigator (deputy) interviewing additional witnesses who had come forward and determination of credibility was in progress. Brown, a 28-year veteran of law enforcement in Surry County, 16 years as sheriff, repeated prior statements that he felt pressure to rush, but "doing it right" was his priority.
- June 7 – Boddie states in interviews with television and newspaper reporters that he was the victim of a conspiracy by authorities, and that his Fourth Amendment rights were violated by the search of the Surry property after his arrest on April 20 in Hampton (and another several days earlier in Newport News) because of the smaller amount of drugs he admits having [than claimed by authorities]. Speaking to the Newport News Daily Press, Boddie also apologized for his role in the dog fighting investigation. Boddie wants NFL Commissioner Roger Goodell to know it was his fault, not his cousin's, for everything going on at the Surry County home. "I want him to know that everything going on is really my fault," Boddie told the paper. "They're just making Michael look like something he's not. I want to apologize to Atlanta Falcons fans for what's going on. It's a lot of drama."

- The same day, USA Today and WAVY-TV each reported the federal officials and Virginia State Police were executing a federal search warrant at the Surry County property, apparently seeking the buried bodies of dogs which may have been killed during dog fighting activities.

- June 8 – Poindexter said he was "absolutely floored" that federal officials got involved, and that he believes he and Sheriff Brown handled the investigation properly. "What is foreign to me is the federal government getting into a dogfighting case," Poindexter said. "I know it's been done, but what's driving this? Is it this boy's celebrity? Would they have done this if it wasn't Michael Vick?" He went on to say "There's a larger thing here, and it has nothing to do with any breach of protocol." "There's something awful going on here. I don't know if it's racial. I don't know what it is."

- Also on June 8, Boddie interview of June 7 published in Daily Press alleges he thinks conspiracy by authorities may date to when Vick's house was built in 2001. In the same article, local prosecutors from several jurisdictions disagreed with Boddie's contention that a smaller amount of marijuana he alleges he had during his April 20 arrest would have invalidated the search warrant executed on April 25. Boddie indicated that he had retained an attorney. However, no attorney appeared to be present as he admitted to reporters from the news media (television and print) his possession of narcotics, pledged his loyalty to cousin Vick, who he stated he has not recently spoken with directly, and denied any knowledge of the 66 dogs found at his home, with the exception of his French poodle.

- Contacted by the Daily Press, Hampton Senior Assistant Commonwealth's Attorney Anton Bell stated that dog fighting evidence turned up during the search following the narcotics arrest was obtained legitimately, a position Surry County prosecutor Poindexter had earlier taken.

- June 15 – ESPN reports that the case investigation involving Vick's property in Virginia is one of many investigations currently underway around the United States by the agents of the U.S. Department of Agriculture (USDA) using a new federal law enacted by the U.S. Congress earlier in 2007 making organizing a dog fight a felony. The agency is pursuing similar cases elsewhere with considerable support from humane societies and local police departments. So far, that new law has been used less than a dozen times; according to the ESPN attorney, as the courts apply it, more precise definitions of "sponsoring" and "promoting" will develop. ."
- July 2 – Federal authorities file documents in U.S. District Court in Richmond outlining an alleged interstate dog fighting operation at the property owned by Vick, the Associated Press reported after filing an inquiry under the U.S. Freedom of Information Act. Vick is not named in the documents, which listed the address of his property at 1915 Moonlight Road in Surry County as the ""main staging area for housing and training the pit bulls involved in the dog fighting venture," according to the filings, which also claims "For the events, participants and dogs traveled from South Carolina, North Carolina, Maryland, New York, Texas and other states." It is also alleged that "members of 'Bad Newz Kennels' also sponsored and exhibited fights in other parts of Virginia, North Carolina, South Carolina, Maryland, New Jersey and other states," the filings said. Unlawful gambling was also described, AP reported. The winning dog would win from "100's up to 1,000's of dollars," and participants and spectators also would place bets on the fight. The federal papers also state "If an admission fee was charged for a particular event, the proceeds were generally used to supplement the funding of the 'Bad Newz Kennels' kennel operation."
- July 6 – Federal authorities, assisted by the Virginia State Police, conduct an additional search of the Surry County location. According to the Richmond Times-Dispatch, WAVY-TV (Portsmouth) was observing from a news helicopter, and reported that fifteen vehicles were on the property, including a rental truck and a Virginia State Police evidence collections truck. In a video broadcast, investigators could be seen working under a blue tarp on a wooded portion of the property near the black-painted outbuildings. They were sifting dirt collected in white buckets and clearing brush. Investigators removed more than 10 carcasses buried in shallow graves, a source close to the investigation said. "They found what they were looking for," he said.

- The same day, according to information gathered by the NFL and Atlanta Falcons, sources told ESPN's Chris Mortensen that Vick is unlikely to be indicted on federal charges as a result of the dog fighting investigation. The authorities have told the Falcons and league that there has not been any evidence that tied to Vick the alleged dog fighting ring, the sources said. The law enforcement authorities have privately told league and team officials that at least three people are expected to be indicted but the identities of those individuals were unknown.

- July 17 – Purnell A. Peace, Quanis L. Phillips, Tony Taylor, and Michael Vick were indicted by a federal grand jury for "conspiracy to travel in interstate commerce in aid of unlawful activities and to sponsor a dog in animal fighting venture". The federal grand jury alleged Peace, Phillips, Taylor and Vick spent six years "knowingly sponsoring and exhibiting in an animal fighting venture." The grand jury also charged the men with establishing a kennel to represent dogfighting competitions, purchase and train pitbulls in dogfighting competitions and "destroying or otherwise disposing of dogs not selected to stay with the ongoing animal fighting venture." The four codefendents each faces $350,000 in fines and six years in prison if convicted of the federal charges.

- The same day, the Humane Society of the United States called upon the NFL to suspend Vick under its disciplinary code.

- July 18 – The U.S. District Court in Richmond announced that Purnell A. Peace, 35, of Virginia Beach; Quanis L. Phillips, 28, of Atlanta; and Tony Taylor, 34, of Hampton; and Michael Vick, 27, of Atlanta; have been ordered to appear in court on July 26 for a detention hearing and arraignment.
- July 19 – U.S. Senator and Senate president pro tempore Robert Byrd, 89, (D-West Virginia), a well-known dog lover, gave a passionate speech in the U.S. Senate about the practice of dog fighting in response to the Vick indictment.

Dog fighting is a brutal, sadistic event motivated by barbarism of the worst sort and cruelty of the worst, worst, worst sadistic kind. One is left wondering, who are the real animals...the creatures inside the ring, or the creatures outside the ring?

^{text with audio}

- The same day, Nike announced it has suspended plans to release a fifth Vick signature shoe. However, it has not terminated its contract with the quarterback.

- July 20 – PETA staged protests outside the NFL headquarters in New York City calling for the firing of Michael Vick by the Atlanta Falcons and the NFL. More than 75 protesters attended, holding signs saying "NFL: Sack Vick" and chanting.

- The same day, Senator John Kerry of Massachusetts said he had sent a letter to Goodell calling for Vick to be suspended. He wrote:

"I urge you to treat this issue with the utmost seriousness as the case progresses. In light of the seriousness of the charges, I believe that Mr. Vick should be suspended from the League, effective immediately."

- July 23 – About 50 people, organized by PETA, protest at the Atlanta Falcons training camp. The team had no comment on these protests, or others held recently at the NFL headquarters in New York City.

- Also on the same day, ESPN reported that Vick has retained the services of former federal prosecutor Billy Martin, an attorney with the Washington, D.C.-based legal firm Sutherland Asbill & Brennan LLP for his defense against the federal criminal charges. Martin joined the firm in February 2007. His notable past clients have included NBA stars Allen Iverson and Jayson Williams (who was acquitted of his most serious crime of shooting someone while drunk), Monica Lewinsky's mother, and Chandra Levy's parents. He also represented former Atlanta mayor Bill Campbell on racketeering, bribery and wire fraud charges; Campbell was convicted of three counts of tax fraud, but acquitted on racketeering charges and taking thousands of dollars in bribes.

- Also on July 23, it was reported that NFL commissioner Roger Goodell had sent Vick a letter ordering him not to report to the first Atlanta Falcons training camp. Goodell said in a letter to the quarterback:

"While it is for the criminal justice system to determine your guilt or innocence, it is my responsibility as commissioner of the National Football League to determine whether your conduct, even if not criminal, nonetheless violated league policies, including the Personal Conduct Policy."

- July 24 – The Surry County grand jury met, but did not consider indictments as the local investigation continued. Sheriff Harold D. Brown stated he expects indictments to be returned during the September session for state charges relating to the dog fighting and animal cruelty investigation, but declined to be more specific regarding any names of person(s) likely to be indicted on those felony counts.
- July 26 – Detention and arraignment hearings were held at U.S. District Court in Richmond for Peace, Phillips, Taylor and Vick. All four pleaded "not guilty" and a trial date was set for November 26. Defendants were released without bond, but with pre-trial conditions and direct court supervision.

- On the same day, federal prosecutors announced that they will file a superseding indictment, which could mean new charges and possibly new defendants in the case.

- July 27 – Nike, Inc. announced it "has suspended Michael Vick's contract without pay, and will not sell any more Michael Vick product at Nike owned retail at this time." The company said it had not terminated the contract, as animal-rights activists had urged.

- On the same day, Adidas announced its Reebok division (the official uniform provider for the league) would stop selling Vick football jerseys and the NFL said it had pulled all Vick-related items from NFLShop.com.

- July 30 – Defendant Tony Taylor pleaded guilty to conspiracy to travel in interstate commerce in aid of unlawful activities and conspiring to sponsor a dog in an animal fighting venture in U.S. District Court.
- July 31 – St. Louis-based sporting goods manufacturer Rawlings, which used Vick's likeness to sell merchandise and modeled a football using his name, ended its relationship. The same day, the Atlanta Journal-Constitution reported that Dick's Sporting Goods and Sports Authority have also stopped selling Vick-related goods.
  - On the same day, WDBJ-TV News in Roanoke, Virginia reported that both prosecution and defense experts on criminal trial procedure have agreed that specific language included in Taylor's plea documents suggests that the federal prosecutors plan to bring racketeering charges under the RICO statutes.
- August 6 – Grand Jury in Hampton, Virginia indicted Davon T. Boddie on the felony charges from his April 20 narcotics arrest.
- August 14 – The Atlanta Journal-Constitution, citing a "person with knowledge of the negotiations" reported that Vick's attorneys were seeking a plea deal with federal negotiators.
- August 17 – Peace and Phillips plead guilty and entered plea agreements in U.S. District Court in Richmond. Phillips' bail was revoked due to failing a drug test. Peace's summary of facts reads in part: "All three participated in executing the dogs. Peace agrees and stipulates that these dogs all died as a result of the collective efforts of Peace, Phillips and Vick." The Newport News Daily Press reported that because of the "victimization and execution of pit bull dogs" described in court filings, "upward departure" from the sentencing guidelines is "necessary in this case." Judge Hudson told the men that the aggravating factors will be taken into consideration at sentencing, which means they could face harsher punishments at their sentencing, Peace and Phillips were told.

- Also on August 17, Surry County Commonwealth's Attorney Gerald Poindexter told WVEC-TV that the admissions contained in the federal plea agreements filed by Purnell Peace and Quanis Phillips were "a road map to indictments in Surry County." Poindexter's looking at two felony counts: dogfighting and killing of a companion animal. The maximum sentence in Virginia for each charge is five years. "We believed we had evidence and this is the first time someone's admitted to it. It's sad and outrageous. It's gruesome." he added. ESPN reported that Vick could face up to 40 years in prison under state law.

- August 20 – Vick's lawyer Billy Martin announced that Vick will plead guilty to the federal felony dogfighting conspiracy charge. He will enter his plea before Judge Hudson on August 27 in Richmond.
- August 24 – Vick signed a plea agreement admitting that he participated in and funded an inter-state dogfighting ring. His official statement maintains that he did not place any bets or take any prize money.

- That same day, the NFL suspended Vick indefinitely without pay. In a letter from NFL commissioner Roger Goodell addressed to Vick, Goodell wrote that Vick's admitted conduct was "not only illegal but also cruel and reprehensible." Goodell also freed the Atlanta Falcons to "assert any claims or remedies" to recover $22 million of Vick's signing bonus from the 10-year, $130 million contract he signed in 2004.

- August 27 – Vick submitted the guilt plea before Judge Hudson. Sentencing was set for December 10.
- September 25 – Vick is indicted in the state of Virginia by the Surry County grand jury on two charges: one count of unlawfully torturing and killing dogs and one of promoting dogfights. Each is a felony charge that could result in a five-year prison term.
- September 26 – Vick fails a court ordered drug test drawn on September 13 for illegal substances (he tests positive for marijuana) and as a result is ordered by US Federal Judge Henry E. Hudson to "submit to any method of testing required by the pretrial services officer or the supervising officer for determining whether the defendant is using a prohibited substance." He must also participate in substance abuse therapy and mental health counseling "if deemed advisable by the pretrial services officer or supervising officer" at his own expense, the order said. In addition, Vick is now subject to a curfew from 10:00PM to 6:00AM and may be subject to electronic monitoring as part of his pre-sentencing release.
- November 30 – Peace and Phillips are sentenced to federal prison terms which exceed federal guidelines and the plea agreement recommendations of prosecutors. An attorney for one argues that Taylor and Vick had greater roles.
- December 10 – Vick is sentenced to 23 months in prison for the investigation and dogfighting charges by Henry E. Hudson. He can get up to 3 months off his sentence for good behavior.

== 2009 ==
May 20- Vick is released from a federal prison in Kansas.

July 21- Vick is released from Federal Custody after serving the last two months of his sentence in Home confinement. Vick's 3 years of probation begins.

== 2012 ==
July- Vick's three year probation ends.
