= Chris Henry (wide receiver) =

American football player (1983–2009)

- Henry in 2008

No. 15
- Position: Wide receiver

Personal information
- Born: May 17, 1983; Belle Chasse, Louisiana, U.S.
- Died: December 17, 2009 (aged 26); Charlotte, North Carolina, U.S.
- Listed height: 6 ft 5 in (1.96 m)
- Listed weight: 200 lb (91 kg)

Career information
- High school: Belle Chasse (LA)
- College: West Virginia (2002–2004)
- NFL draft: 2005: 3rd round, 83rd overall pick

Career history
- Cincinnati Bengals (2005–2009)

Career NFL statistics
- Receptions: 119
- Receiving yards: 1,826
- Receiving touchdowns: 20
- Stats at Pro Football Reference

Christopher Henry (May 17, 1983 – December 17, 2009) was an American professional football player who was a wide receiver for five seasons with the Cincinnati Bengals of the National Football League (NFL). He played college football for the West Virginia Mountaineers and was selected by the Bengals in the third round of the 2005 NFL draft.

Henry died on December 17, 2009, when he fell out of the back of a moving truck after having a domestic dispute with his fiancée. An autopsy revealed that Henry had developed chronic traumatic encephalopathy (CTE) during his playing career due to repetitive hits to the head. Because CTE can only be definitively diagnosed in an autopsy and Henry was still active in the NFL when he died, Henry represented the first case where an active player had died and could be diagnosed with CTE.

== Early life ==
Henry was born to Carolyn Lee and David Henry in Belle Chasse, Louisiana. He attended Belle Chasse High School where he was named New Orleans small schools offensive player of the year during his senior year. During that season the Fighting Cardinals made it to the Louisiana AAA State championship game, which was played at the Louisiana Superdome. Henry also excelled in basketball and track.

== College career ==
Henry enrolled at West Virginia University in 2002, spending his first season as a redshirt. In 2003, he earned Big East Conference freshman of the year and All-Big East second-team honors for catching 41 passes and gaining 1,006 yards and scoring 10 touchdowns. He also became the second player in school history to record over 1,000 receiving yards in one season (behind David Saunders), and his 24.5 yards per reception are the third most in a season in school history. Henry's best game was a career-high performance of 209 yards and two touchdowns against Syracuse. His career-long reception came against Rutgers that season, an 83-yard reception.

In 2004, Henry started seven games and caught 52 passes for 872 yards with 12 touchdowns. After catching three passes in a 30–18 loss to Florida State in the 2005 Gator Bowl, Henry announced that he would enter the 2005 NFL draft.

During Henry's sophomore season, he was ejected from a game at Rutgers University due to multiple unsportsmanlike conduct penalties and was suspended for the season finale against the University of Pittsburgh. His former Mountaineers coach, Rich Rodriguez, stated that he was "an embarrassment to himself and the program" for his conduct.

Henry majored in athletic coaching education.

Henry was the third player in Mountaineers' history to average more than twenty yards per catch for his career. Henry's 1,878 career receiving yards is eighth most in school history, while his 93 receptions are the 14th most. His 22 touchdown receptions are also second most in school history. Henry's six career 100-yard receiving games is tied for third most in school history.

== Professional career ==
Pre-draft measurables
Height	Weight	40-yard dash	10-yard split	20-yard split	Vertical jump
6 ft 4 in (1.93 m)	197 lb (89 kg)	4.50 s	1.64 s	2.68 s	36.0 in (0.91 m)
All values from NFL Combine/Pro Day

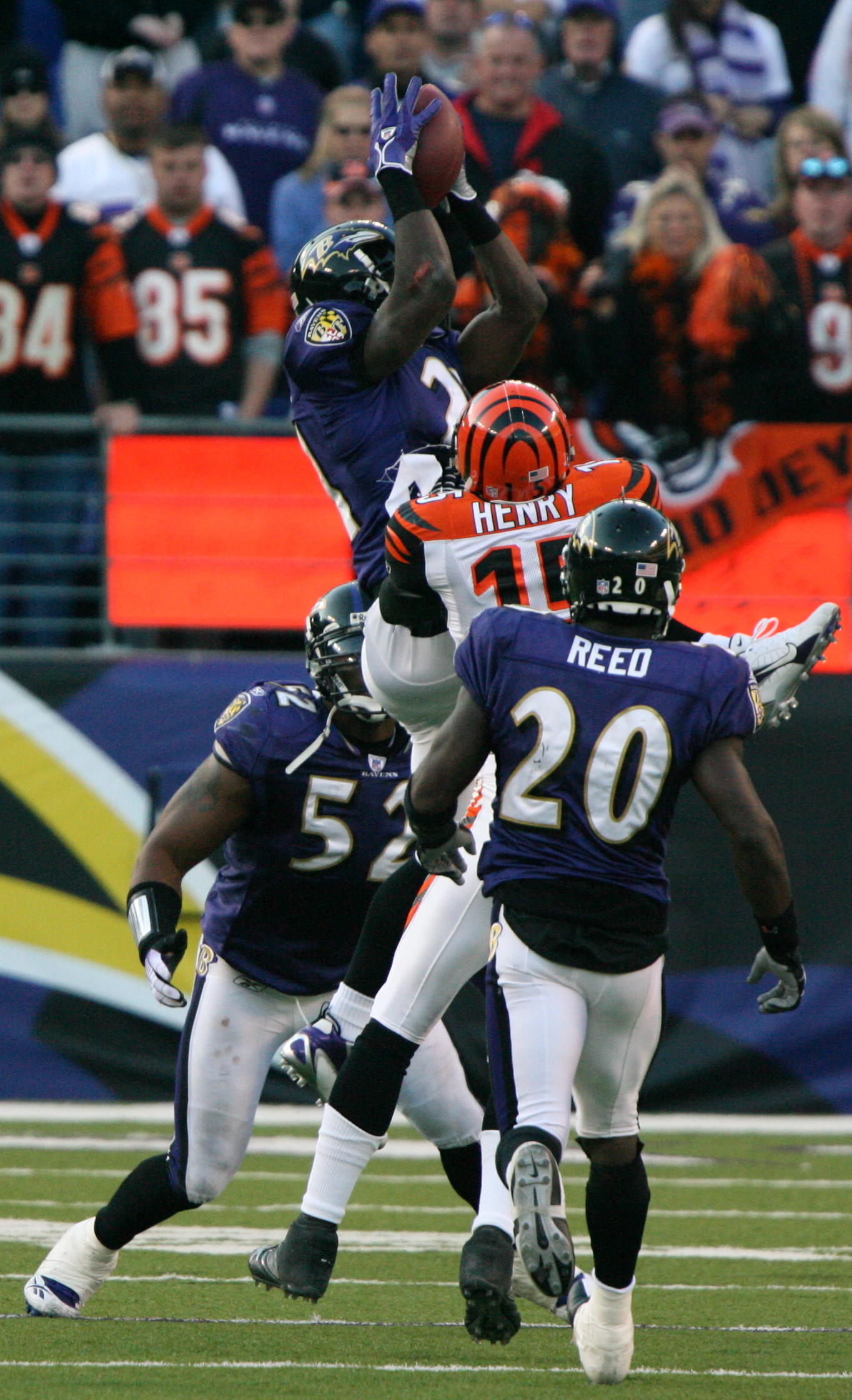
Henry in 2006

Henry was selected by the Cincinnati Bengals in the third round of the 2005 NFL draft. He made his NFL debut on September 18, 2005, against the Minnesota Vikings. In his rookie season with the Bengals, he amassed 31 receptions for 422 yards and six touchdowns. In the Bengals' first playoff game in fifteen years against the Pittsburgh Steelers, he had a reception for 66 yards on the Bengals' second play from scrimmage. However, on the play, both he and Bengals quarterback Carson Palmer had knee injuries.

In his second season, Henry totaled 605 yards on 36 receptions for nine touchdowns, with an average of 16.8 yards per catch. In the second game of the season against the Cleveland Browns, Henry recorded five receptions for 113 yards, while he recorded two touchdowns the next week against the Pittsburgh Steelers. In the season finale against the Steelers, Henry totaled 124 yards off of four receptions and scored one touchdown.

Henry was suspended for eight games in 2007 for violating the NFL's personal conduct policy. He returned in week 10 against the Baltimore Ravens, where he had four receptions for 99 yards. In the following loss to Arizona, Henry totaled eight receptions for 81 yards and one touchdown. Henry finished the season with 21 receptions for 343 yards and two touchdowns.

Following his arrest in April 2008, Henry was waived by the Bengals. President Mike Brown explained that Henry had forfeited his opportunity to pursue a career with the Bengals and that his conduct could no longer be tolerated.

On April 7, 2008, ESPN radio analyst and former player Michael Irvin said he took a phone call from Henry, discussing "cleaning up his act", much like Irvin encouraged Adam "Pacman" Jones to do. Henry and Jones were teammates at West Virginia, and both served NFL suspensions imposed by NFL commissioner Roger Goodell during the 2007 NFL season.

With Bengals receivers Chad Ochocinco, T. J. Houshmandzadeh, and Andre Caldwell nursing injuries during the 2008 preseason, Henry was re-signed to a two-year contract by the Bengals on August 18. The move came less than a month after Bengals head coach Marvin Lewis stated the team had no interest in bringing back Henry. After serving his four-game suspension to begin the 2008 season, Henry was activated from the exemption list on October 4. Henry finished the 2008 season with 19 receptions for 220 yards and two touchdowns. He was placed on injured reserve in November 2009, after suffering a broken forearm while making a 20-yard reception against the Baltimore Ravens.

== Legal issues and suspension ==
On December 15, 2005, Henry was pulled over in northern Kentucky for speeding. During a search, marijuana was found in his shoes. He was also driving without a valid driver's license or valid insurance. He pleaded guilty and avoided a jail sentence.

One month later, on January 30, 2006, he was arrested in Orlando, Florida, for multiple gun charges including concealment and aggravated assault with a firearm. He was reported to have been wearing his #15 Bengals jersey at the time of his arrest. He pleaded guilty to this charge and avoided jail time.

On April 29, 2006, Henry allowed three females under the legal drinking age (ages 18, 16 and 15) to consume alcohol at a hotel in Covington, Kentucky. One of the three, an 18-year-old woman, accused Henry of sexually assaulting her; she later retracted her story and was charged with filing a false police report.

Henry was pulled over on Interstate 275 in Ohio on June 3, 2006, at 1:18 a.m. by Ohio Highway Patrol trooper Michael Shimko for suspected drunk driving. He voluntarily submitted to a breathalyzer test at 2:06 a.m. at the Milford Police Department and registered a .092 blood-alcohol level, .012 above the level permitted in the state of Ohio.

On October 6, 2006, Henry was suspended by the NFL for two games for violating the league's substance abuse and personal conduct policies. NFL policies forbade Henry from taking part in practices; however, he was allowed to attend any team meetings. Henry missed the Bengals' October 15, 2006 game at Tampa Bay and their October 22, 2006 home game versus Carolina.

On January 25, 2007, Henry pleaded guilty to a misdemeanor violation of a city ordinance commonly referred to as a "keg law." He was sentenced to 90 days in jail, with all but two of those days being suspended.

In April 2007, Henry was suspended for the first eight games of the 2007 NFL season for violations of the NFL's personal conduct policy. His suspension on the 10th came with a stern warning that future misconduct may result in the end of his career with the NFL. Henry was given permission by NFL Commissioner Roger Goodell to begin practicing fully. His suspension was lifted, and he played in the November 11, 2007, game versus the Baltimore Ravens, amassing four catches for 99 yards.

Henry allegedly assaulted a valet attendant at Newport on the Levee in Newport, Kentucky on November 6, 2007. He was arrested for a second time in Orlando on December 3 for violating probation stemming from his January 30, 2006, arrest. On February 21, 2008, he was found not guilty.

On March 31, 2008, Henry punched Gregory Meyer, 18, in the face and threw a beer bottle through the window of his car. Henry claimed it was a case of mistaken identity and that he thought it was somebody else that owed him money. Henry was waived by the Bengals a day after this arrest and was then served a house arrest sentence.

== Death ==
On December 16, 2009, Henry sustained injuries when he fell out of the back of a moving truck driven by his fiancée, Loleini Tonga, while they were engaged in a domestic dispute. Tonga had three children with Henry. On December 17, 2009, Charlotte police announced that Henry had died at 6:36 a.m. ET at Carolinas Medical Center from the injuries sustained in the domestic dispute. Two days later, on December 19, police confirmed that Henry died of blunt force trauma to the head. No charges were filed against his fiancée, and police announced that they found no evidence that Tonga drove recklessly or with excessive speed. There was no alcohol in Henry's blood at the time of the incident.

To honor Henry, every game of Week 15 (December 17–21) in the NFL that year began with a moment of silence before kickoff.

"Our football team, what they're feeling yesterday and this morning ... they watched a guy mature as a young man and work through adversity," Lewis said, adding that Henry became "a beacon of hope."

On December 20, three days after Henry's death, the Bengals traveled to Qualcomm Stadium to face the San Diego Chargers. As with all the other Week 15 games, a moment of silence was held before kickoff. Bengals wide receiver Chad Ochocinco, a close friend of Henry's, openly wept during the silence. Later in the game, on his first touchdown reception, Ochocinco dropped to his knee and paid tribute to Henry in the end zone.

In June 2010, the Brain Injury Research Institute of West Virginia University released a report that Henry had developed a brain disease called chronic traumatic encephalopathy (CTE) during his playing career due to multiple hard hits to the head. The discovery that Henry had CTE has become a serious issue of concern for football and brain safety, especially since Henry was relatively young and had never been diagnosed with a concussion in any of his five NFL seasons or during his college career at West Virginia. The latest research indicates an accumulation of lesser blows can cause brain damage. It was also believed that the brain damage Henry suffered may have been a factor in his numerous off-the-field incidents.

Henry's CTE was confirmed by an autopsy after his death. He was one of at least 345 NFL players to be diagnosed after death with this disease.

After his death, Henry's mother made the decision to donate his organs for transplant. Henry's corneas, lungs, kidneys, heart, liver, and pancreas were transplanted, saving the lives of four people.

== Family ==
Henry's three children were raised by teammate Adam "Pacman" Jones. One of his sons, Chris Henry Jr., plays college football for the Ohio State Buckeyes. His daughter Seini plays basketball at Ohio State. Son Demarcus Henry recently committed to play college basketball at the University of North Carolina.

== See also ==
- National Football League player conduct controversy
- List of American football players who died during their careers
