= UltraViolet (organization) =

Women's advocacy organization

- Formation: 2012
- Members: over 700,000
- Cofounder: Nita Chaudhary, Shaunna Thomas
- Website: www.weareultraviolet.org

UltraViolet is a women's advocacy group based in the United States. The group conducts online campaigns using social media to highlight women's issues such as violence against women, maternity leave, equal pay, and reproductive rights. Their mission statement is to "fight sexism and create a more inclusive world that accurately represents all women".

== Foundation ==
UltraViolet was co-founded in February 2012 by Nita Chaudhary and Shaunna Thomas. The name is associated with purple, a color used symbolically in the struggle for women's suffrage in the United States, LGBT social movements, and second-wave feminism. Co-founder Chaudhary adds that "UltraViolet lights are sort of the most powerful rays on the spectrum and they expose things that people don't want to see, and our mission is to expose things people are uncomfortable confronting, especially with respect to sexism."

Within two months of its foundation, UltraViolet had 300,000 members.

== Campaigns ==
UltraViolet has conducted over 30 online campaigns for women's rights. They have also organized protests and phone lobbying. They also sponsor campaigns in newspapers.

=== Susan G. Komen Foundation ===
In February 2012 the Susan G. Komen Foundation decided to stop funding for breast cancer screenings at Planned Parenthood. UltraViolet, which had been scheduled to debut in the summer, spearheaded a campaign against Komen with the assistance of MoveOn.org and CREDO SuperPac. They collected nearly one million signatures on a petition that was delivered to the foundation. The foundation reversed its decision and reinstated Planned Parenthood's funding within a week of receiving the petition. General understanding is that Susan G. Komen Foundation stopped funding Planned Parenthood because Planned Parenthood performed abortions, not for breast cancer screenings, but was pressured into resuming funding because of UltraViolet's intervention. Following their victory, UltraViolet campaigned for the resignation of Karen Handel, the Komen Foundation vice president that orchestrated the effort to defund Planned Parenthood. Handel resigned shortly after.

=== R. Kelly ===
UltraViolet has made many strides in overcoming sexism through their words and actions. One of these strides include being part of the influence that made Sony decide to cut ties with R. Kelly due to allegations of sexual abuse of minors, by using the hashtag #MuteRKelly.

=== Rick Ross ===
UltraViolet led a campaign to get Reebok to end their relationship with rapper Rick Ross after he rapped about date raping a woman in his song "U.O.E.N.O.".

=== NFL domestic abuse ===
In 2014, following several incidents of domestic abuse by NFL players, UltraViolet called for the resignation of NFL commissioner Roger Goodell. The group flew aerial banners over three NFL stadiums with the message "#GoodellMustGo".

=== Airport billboards ===
In 2014 UltraViolet placed messages on billboards near airports in North Carolina, Texas, Louisiana and Ohio. The billboards were critical of state policies towards women.
