= Tank Johnson =

American football player (born 1981)

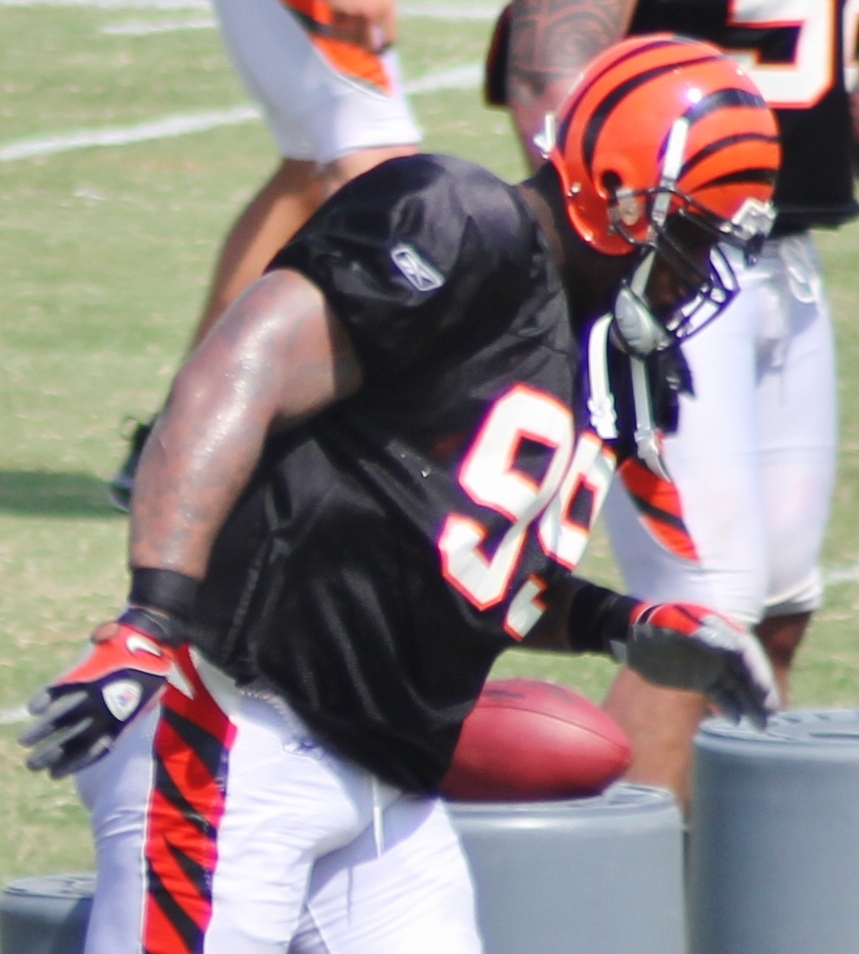
- Johnson with the Cincinnati Bengals in 2010

No. 99, 66, 95
- Position: Defensive tackle

Personal information
- Born: December 7, 1981 (age 44); Gary, Indiana, U.S.
- Listed height: 6 ft 3 in (1.91 m)
- Listed weight: 315 lb (143 kg)

Career information
- High school: McClintock (Tempe, Arizona)
- College: Washington
- NFL draft: 2004: 2nd round, 47th overall pick

Career history
- Chicago Bears (2004–2006); Dallas Cowboys (2007–2008); Cincinnati Bengals (2009–2010)

Awards and highlights
- Second-team All-Pac-10 (2003)

Career NFL statistics
- Total tackles: 154
- Sacks: 14.0
- Forced fumbles: 2
- Fumble recoveries: 1
- Stats at Pro Football Reference

Terry "Tank" Johnson (born December 7, 1981) is an American former professional football player who was a defensive tackle in the National Football League (NFL) for the Chicago Bears, Dallas Cowboys and Cincinnati Bengals. He was selected by the Bears in the second round of the 2004 NFL draft. He played college football for the Washington Huskies.

== Early life ==
Johnson was born in Gary, Indiana. His father moved him to Arizona when he was six years old. He attended McClintock High School in Tempe, Arizona, where he had a B-plus grade average. As a senior, he had 21 receptions, 211 yards, 4 touchdowns, 47 tackles, 3 sacks and 3 forced fumbles. He was two-time All-city and All-region honoree.

In basketball, he received Pepperdine Prep All-American honors as a senior. In volleyball, he received All-state, All-region and All-city honors.

== College career ==
Johnson accepted a football scholarship from the University of Washington. He originally was recruited to play tight end. As a freshman he was suspended as a partial qualifier.

As a sophomore, he was converted into a defensive tackle. He appeared in 10 games as a backup, making 4 tackles (one for loss). He missed the fifth game against UCLA with a sore knee.

As a junior, he started 11 out of 13 games at defensive tackle. He registered 25 tackles (9.5 for loss), 5 sacks, one interception (returned for a touchdown) and one forced fumble. He contributed to a defense that ranked 11th in the nation with 97.7 rushing yards allowed per game.

As a senior, he started 12 games at both defensive tackle and defensive end. He posted 35 tackles, 10 sacks (led the team), 18.5 tackles for loss (led the team), one forced fumble and one fumble recovery (scored a touchdown).

He finished his college career with 23 starts out of 35 games, collecting 64 tackles (29 for loss), 15 sacks, one interception, 2 passes defensed, 2 forced fumbles and one fumble recovery.

== Professional career ==
Pre-draft measurables
Height	Weight	Arm length	Hand span	40-yard dash	10-yard split	20-yard split	20-yard shuttle	Three-cone drill	Vertical jump	Broad jump	Bench press
6 ft 2 3/4 in (1.90 m)	304 lb (138 kg)	32 5/8 in (0.83 m)	9 5/8 in (0.24 m)	4.74 s	1.70 s	2.77 s	4.60 s	7.56 s	34 in (0.86 m)	9 ft 6 in (2.90 m)	31 reps
All values from NFL Combine

=== Chicago Bears ===
Johnson was selected by the Chicago Bears in the second round (47th overall) of the 2004 NFL draft. As a rookie, he appeared in 16 games with one start, making 26 tackles and a half sack.

In 2005, he played in 16 games with 4 starts, making 37 tackles (4 for loss), 5 sacks (fourth on the team) and 4 passes defensed. He had 8 tackles and 2 sacks against the Baltimore Ravens. Along with teammates Tommie Harris, Brian Urlacher, Lance Briggs, and Charles Tillman, Johnson helped the Bears' establish the league's most productive defense during the season.

In 2006, Johnson saw more action due to the loss of injured Tommie Harris, allowing him to start 10 games, as the team reached Super Bowl XLI. He posted 38 tackles (2 for loss), 3.5 sacks and one forced fumble.

On January 23, 2007, two days after the Bears won the NFC Championship Game, Johnson was forced to appear in Circuit court to request permission to leave the State of Illinois to travel to Miami, Florida to play in Super Bowl XLI stemming from an arrest on gun charges late in 2006. The request was granted, and he played in the game, recording four tackles, assisting on another, and getting a half-sack. On May 16, 2007, Johnson met with NFL commissioner Roger Goodell to determine punishment for his off-the-field transgressions, with Goodell eventually imposing an eight-game suspension, with the possibility of a reduction to six games if Johnson followed certain requirements for violating the NFL player conduct policy.

On June 25, 2007, three days after being pulled over for speeding and suspicion of drunk driving by the police in Gilbert, Arizona, the Bears waived Johnson, although there were no criminal charges.

=== Dallas Cowboys ===
On September 18, 2007, Jerry Jones the owner of the Dallas Cowboys, took a chance and signed Johnson as a free agent, to provide depth after losing Jason Ferguson for the year with a torn right biceps. He was forced to miss the first eight games, suspended by the league for violating probation on a gun charge. On November 11, he returned to the field against the New York Giants, making three solo tackles and one sack.

He didn't perform as well as expected while playing nose tackle in a 3–4 defense, instead of defensive tackle in a 4–3 scheme, additionally Jay Ratliff had a break-out year, earning the starting position. He finished the season with 10 tackles, two sacks, one quarterback pressure, one pass defensed and one forced fumble.

In 2008, he played through a sprained ankle in a reserve role behind Ratliff. He posted 45 tackles (three for loss), one sack, nine quarterback pressures, three passes defensed and one forced fumble. Even though Johnson had no off-field issues in Dallas, he wasn't re-signed at the end of the year.

=== Cincinnati Bengals ===
On April 7, 2009, Johnson signed with Cincinnati Bengals, who at the time had a reputation of taking chances on talented players. He played at his natural defensive tackle position in a 4–3 defense. He started 13 games, making 29 tackles and two sacks.

On March 8, 2010, Johnson was signed by the Bengals to a 4-year deal as an unrestricted free agent. He started the first seven games until suffering a season ending right knee injury against the Miami Dolphins on October 31. He was placed on the injured reserve list on November 23. He started in seven games, registering 10 tackles (one for loss).

On August 16, 2011, his contract was terminated by the Bengals and he was replaced in the starting unit with second-year player Geno Atkins.

== NFL career statistics ==
Legend
**Bold**	Career high

=== Regular season ===
Year	Team	Games		Tackles					Interceptions					Fumbles			
Year	Team	GP	GS	Cmb	Solo	Ast	Sck	TFL	Int	Yds	TD	Lng	PD	FF	FR	Yds	TD
2004	CHI	16	1	19	14	5	0.5	4	0	0	0	0	0	0	0	0	0
2005	CHI	16	4	**34**	**27**	7	**5.0**	**9**	0	0	0	0	**3**	0	0	0	0
2006	CHI	14	10	26	22	4	3.5	5	0	0	0	0	1	**1**	0	0	0
2007	DAL	8	1	14	10	4	2.0	3	0	0	0	0	2	0	**1**	0	0
2008	DAL	16	1	22	13	9	1.0	4	0	0	0	0	0	**1**	0	0	0
2009	CIN	14	13	29	16	**13**	2.0	2	0	0	0	0	1	0	0	0	0
2010	CIN	7	7	10	5	5	0.0	1	0	0	0	0	0	0	0	0	0
		91	37	154	107	47	14.0	28	0	0	0	0	7	2	1	0	0

=== Postseason ===
Year	Team	Games		Tackles					Interceptions					Fumbles			
Year	Team	GP	GS	Cmb	Solo	Ast	Sck	TFL	Int	Yds	TD	Lng	PD	FF	FR	Yds	TD
2005	CHI	1	0	1	1	0	0.0	1	0	0	0	0	0	0	0	0	0
2006	CHI	3	3	**8**	**7**	**1**	**1.5**	**2**	0	0	0	0	0	0	0	0	0
2007	DAL	1	0	1	1	0	1.0	1	0	0	0	0	0	0	0	0	0
2009	CIN	1	1	1	1	0	0.0	0	0	0	0	0	**1**	0	0	0	0
		6	4	11	10	1	2.5	4	0	0	0	0	1	0	0	0	0

== Legal troubles ==
In November 2005, Johnson was arrested at the Excalibur nightclub in Chicago for possession of a handgun in his sport utility vehicle. Johnson pleaded guilty to a misdemeanor gun charge. He received 18 months probation and was ordered to undergo 40 hours of community service. On February 12, 2006, Johnson, while still on probation, was charged with aggravated assault and resisting arrest after verbally threatening a police officer. The charges were eventually dropped.

On December 14, Lake County police officers searched Johnson's home in Gurnee, Illinois and discovered that he possessed six firearms, including two assault rifles. According to police reports, some of the guns were loaded and there were children inside the house. Although Johnson was at football practice during the search, his bodyguard Willie Bernard Posey was arrested from his house for alleged possession of marijuana. Johnson was charged with violation to probation and possessing unlicensed weapons. Bears coach Lovie Smith deactivated Johnson for the following game against the Tampa Bay Buccaneers based on this incident.

On December 16, 2006, Johnson's best friend and bodyguard Willie Bernard Posey was killed in a shooting at the Ice Bar in Chicago's River North neighborhood. Posey was shot after he was allegedly involved in a fight around midnight. Posey was rushed to Northwestern Memorial Hospital, where he was pronounced dead at 1:30 a.m. Posey's assailant was not immediately apprehended. However, on December 28, Chicago Police apprehended Michael Selvie, Posey's alleged assailant. Selvie, a "reputed gang member" has been implicated in over 30 other crimes. On February 19, 2010, Selvie was convicted of first degree murder and sentenced to 55 years in prison.

On December 22, Cook County Circuit Judge John J. Moran Jr. (Skokie courthouse, Second District, Cook County, Illinois) placed Johnson on home confinement, preventing him from driving by himself or leaving the state of Illinois. On December 30, 2006, Johnson contacted Gurnee Police Department to file harassment charges.

On February 8, 2007, Johnson entered a guilty plea in Cook County's Courthouse in Skokie for violating his probation. On February 17, Johnson's lawyer contested a Lake County Circuit Court to drop Johnson's unlicensed weapons charges. His attorney claimed that since Johnson was a resident of Arizona, he did not have to abide by the gun registration laws of Illinois. On March 15, Johnson was sentenced to 120 days in Cook County Jail and fined $2,500 for violating his probation. Johnson entered a plea of not guilty on 10 counts of possessing a weapon without the proper state-required ID.

On April 30, Johnson pleaded guilty to a misdemeanor weapons charge as part of an arrangement with prosecutors that kept him from serving additional jail time. He was sentenced to 45 days in jail, which was served concurrently with a four-month sentence he was already serving in the Cook County Jail for violating his probation; to donate $2,500 to the Gurnee Police Department and $2,500 to the Gurnee Exchange Club's child abuse prevention program. While he was in jail, many of his teammates and coaches, including Brian Urlacher, Rex Grossman, and Lovie Smith visited Johnson. His release from jail on May 13, 2007, ended his legal problems from the December 2006 weapons incident. The league ultimately suspended Johnson for half of the regular season on June 4.

On June 22, Johnson was pulled over for speeding in Gilbert, Arizona. He was also suspected of driving while impaired "to the slightest degree", but was released without being booked or charged. The Bears ultimately released Johnson on June 25. Almost a week after Johnson was waived, the results from a blood test conducted on Johnson when he was pulled over confirmed his blood alcohol content was under the legal limit.

== Personal life ==
After retiring from professional football, Johnson attended Mesa Community College in Arizona to complete the requirements for a degree in sociology from the University of Washington. He created a counseling program called 'Moving the Chains', which helps ex-offenders learn from their mistakes and avoid negative influences in their life. Johnson commented on his legal problems, stating, "I got in a ton of trouble and I wasn't a bad guy. I had myself in too many uncontrolled environments."

== See also ==
- National Football League player conduct controversy
- Washington Huskies football statistical leaders
