= Roger Goodell =

American businessman and NFL commissioner

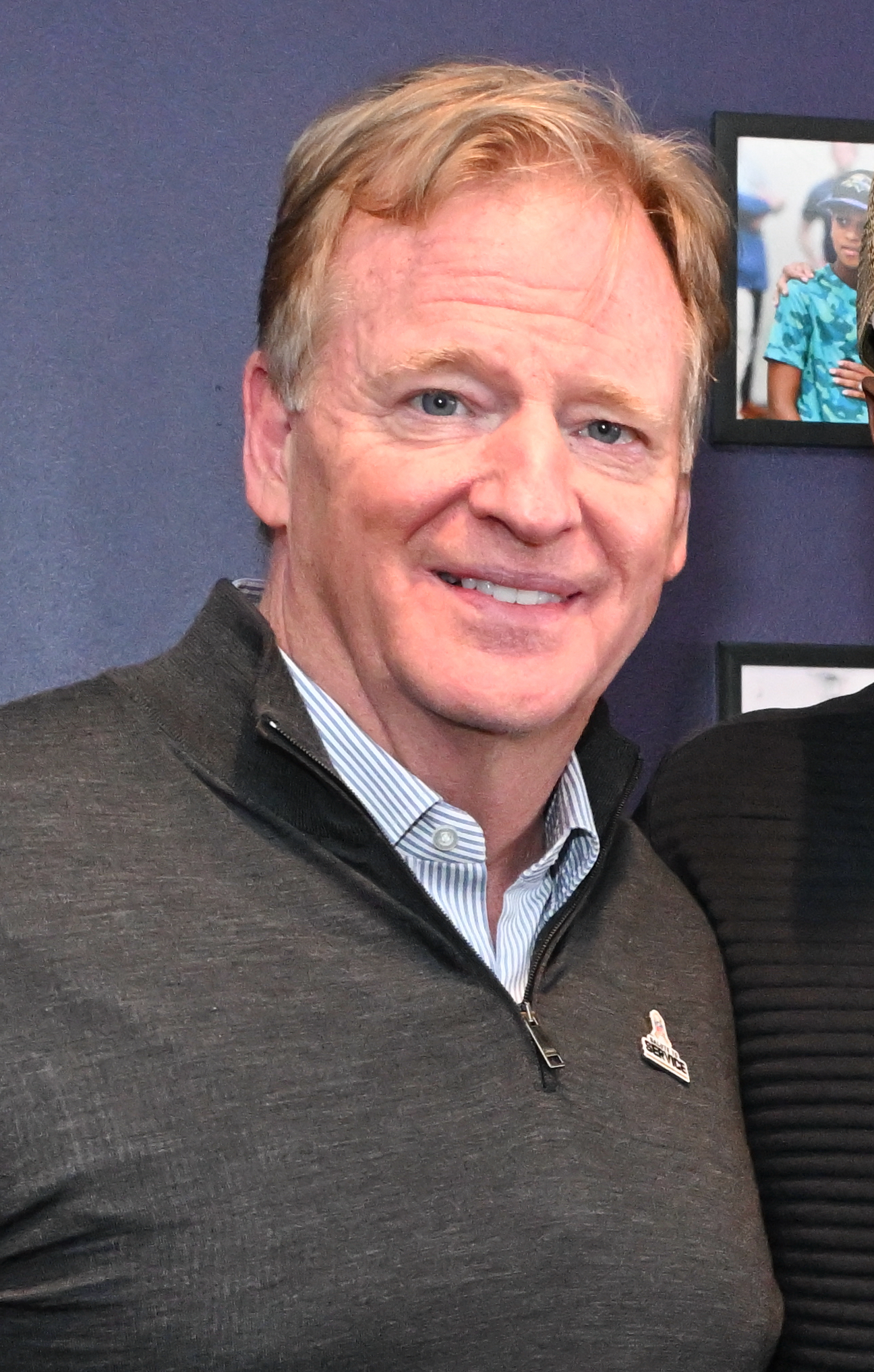
- Goodell in 2023

6th Commissioner of the NFL
- Incumbent
- Assumed office September 1, 2006
- Preceded by: Paul Tagliabue

Personal details
- Born: Roger Stokoe Goodell; February 19, 1959 (age 67) Jamestown, New York, U.S.
- Spouse: Jane Skinner (m. 1997)
- Children: 2
- Parent: Charles Goodell (father)
- Relatives: Samuel Skinner (father-in-law); Andy Goodell (cousin)
- Education: Washington and Jefferson College (BA)

Roger Stokoe Goodell (born February 19, 1959) is an American businessman who has been the commissioner of the National Football League (NFL) since 2006.

Goodell began his NFL career in 1982 as an administrative intern in the league office in New York under then-commissioner Pete Rozelle. The position was secured through a letter-writing campaign to the league office and each of its then 28 teams. In 1983, he joined the New York Jets as an intern, but returned to the league office in 1984 as an assistant in the public relations department.

In 1987, Goodell was appointed assistant to the president of the American Football Conference, Lamar Hunt, and under the Commissioner Paul Tagliabue filled a variety of football and business operations roles, culminating with his appointment as the NFL's executive vice president and chief operating officer in December 2001. As the NFL's COO, Goodell took responsibility for the league's football operations and officiating, as well as supervised league business functions. He headed NFL Ventures, which oversees the league's business units, including media properties, marketing and sales, stadium development, and strategic planning.

Goodell participated in the negotiation of the collective bargaining agreement with the NFLPA and NFL owners during the summer of 2011. He also played a role in league expansion, realignment, and stadium development, including the launch of the NFL Network and securing new television agreements.

== Early life ==
Goodell was born in Jamestown, New York, on February 19, 1959, to United States Senator Charles Ellsworth Goodell of New York and his first wife, Jean (née Rice) Goodell, of Buffalo, New York. Goodell graduated from Bronxville High School where, as a three-sport star in football, basketball, and baseball, he captained all three teams as a senior and was named the school's athlete of the year. Injuries kept him from playing college football. Goodell is a 1981 graduate of Washington & Jefferson College in Washington, Pennsylvania with a Bachelor of Science in economics.

== As NFL Commissioner ==
=== Selection ===
When Tagliabue retired, Goodell was one of the candidates in contention for the position. In the second and third ballots, Goodell and Gregg Levy were the only candidates to receive votes (Goodell 17, Levy 14). Goodell increased his lead to 21–10 after the fourth ballot, falling one vote shy of election, but on the fifth round of voting two owners swung their votes to him to achieve the necessary two-thirds majority (Goodell 23, Levy 8). The Oakland Raiders abstained from the voting in each round.

On August 8, 2006, Goodell was chosen to succeed Tagliabue; he assumed office on September 1, the date Tagliabue was required to step down.

=== Actions ===
Goodell has said that his primary responsibility as commissioner is protecting the integrity of the game and making it safer—"protecting the shield", as he puts it (a reference to the NFL's shield logo). However, some of his actions in this regard have been met with criticism.

In 2014, Goodell was awarded the third highest honor within the Department of the Army Civilian Awards scheme, the Outstanding Civilian Service Award, for substantial contributions to the US Army community while working as the NFL commissioner.

On September 6, 2026, NFL owners agreed to a four-year contract extension for Goodell, keeping him as commissioner through the 2030 NFL season. The agreement expires March 31, 2031. This is his fifth contract extension as commissioner.

==== NFL in Europe ====
The spring league NFL Europe, founded in 1995 and since 2004 with five of six teams based in Germany, was shut down by Goodell after the 2007 season. The NFL International Series began in October 2007 with regular season games in London.

==== Player conduct policy ====
In April 2007, following a year of significant scandal surrounding some NFL players' actions off the field, Goodell announced a new NFL Personal Conduct Policy. Tennessee Titans cornerback Pacman Jones and Cincinnati Bengals wide receiver Chris Henry were the first two players to be suspended under the new policy, and Chicago Bears defensive lineman Tank Johnson was suspended months later because of his conduct involving weapon ownership and drunk driving.

On August 31, 2007, Goodell suspended Dallas Cowboys quarterbacks coach Wade Wilson for five games and fined him US$100,000 and suspended New England Patriots safety Rodney Harrison for four games without pay, after they admitted the use of banned substances for medical purposes and to accelerate healing, respectively. The league indicated to Wilson that his more severe penalty was because they held "people in authority in higher regard than people on the field." Goodell has also imposed suspensions on the following players for conduct:

Date(s) suspended	Suspension length	Name	Position	Team at the time of suspension
April 10, 2007	Entire 2007 season	Adam "Pacman" Jones	Cornerback	Tennessee Titans
April 10, 2007	First 8 games of 2007 season	Chris Henry	Wide receiver	Cincinnati Bengals
June 4, 2007	First 8 games of 2007 season	Terry "Tank" Johnson	Defensive tackle	Chicago Bears
August 24, 2007 – July 27, 2009	Suspended for the first two regular season games in the 2009 season and could play by week three of the season. He can play the final two pre-season games.	Michael Vick	Quarterback	Atlanta Falcons
October 14, 2008	Indefinite (ultimately was the minimum of 4 games)	Adam "Pacman" Jones	Cornerback	Dallas Cowboys
August 13, 2009	Entire 2009 Season	Donté Stallworth	Wide receiver	Cleveland Browns
April 21, 2010	First 6 games of 2010 season (later changed to 4 games due to continuous following of the NFL personal conduct guidelines)	Ben Roethlisberger	Quarterback	Pittsburgh Steelers
November 29 – December 11, 2011	Weeks 13 and 14 of 2011 season	Ndamukong Suh	Defensive tackle	Detroit Lions
September 7, 2014 – November 2014	First two weeks of 2014 season plus ten additional weeks (originally two games, then changed to Indefinite following release of the video of the assault which was vacated after 12 weeks)	Ray Rice	Running back	Baltimore Ravens

In addition to suspensions, Goodell has also fined players for on-field misconduct. For example, on October 19, 2010, the NFL handed out fines to Pittsburgh Steelers linebacker James Harrison, Falcons cornerback Dunta Robinson, and New England Patriots safety Brandon Meriweather after they were involved in controversial hits the previous Sunday. Goodell released a memo to every team in the league stating that "It is clear to me that further action is required to emphasize the importance of teaching safe and controlled techniques, and of playing within the rules." The NFL's reaction to the hits was itself controversial and Goodell came under criticism from players like Troy Polamalu, who felt he had assumed too much control and power over punishment towards players and was making wrong decisions.

Two national political advocacy groups, CREDO and UltraViolet have submitted a petition with over 100,000 signatures calling on Goodell and the NFL to "address its domestic violence problem." This came after Ray Rice was suspended for two games when he was accused of assaulting his then fiancée, Janay Palmer, who is now his wife.

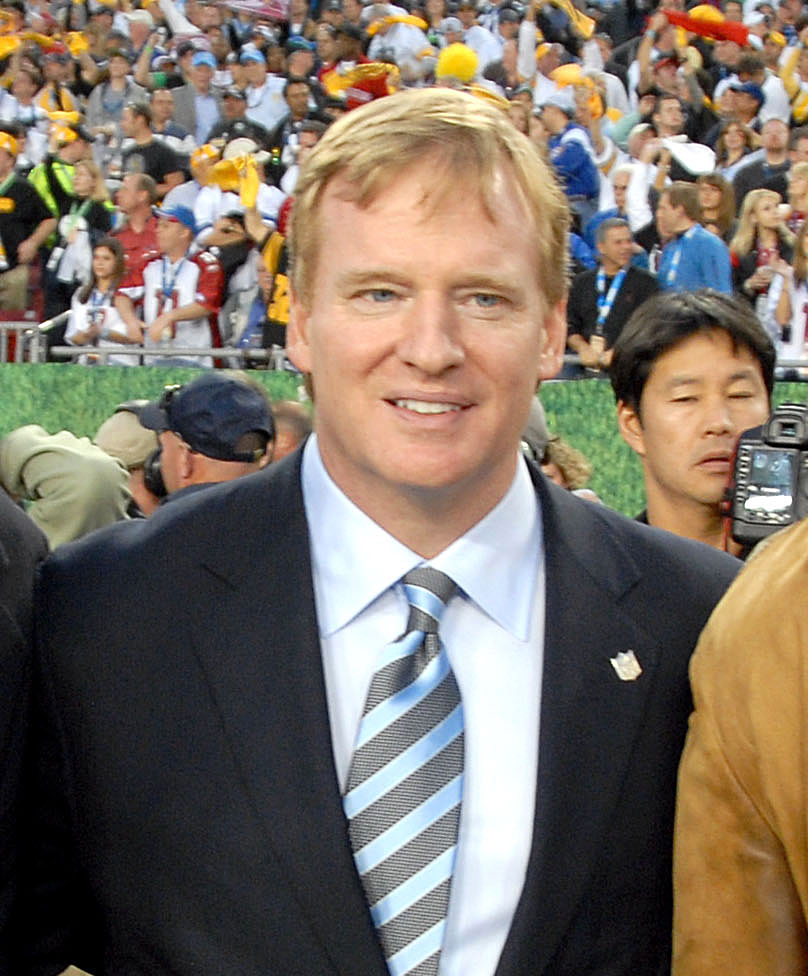
Goodell in 2009

==== Handling of Spygate and the ordered destruction of Patriots' film tapes ====
On September 13, 2007, Goodell disciplined the New England Patriots and head coach Bill Belichick after New England attempted to videotape the defensive signals of the New York Jets from an illegal position on September 9. In the aftermath, Belichick was fined the league maximum of $500,000. The Patriots themselves were fined $250,000 and had to forfeit a first round pick in the 2008 NFL draft. As part of Goodell's probe into the allegations, the NFL required the Patriots to turn over any and all notes and tapes relating to the taping of opponents' defensive signals. The Patriots did not want the video tapes to leave their facilities, so league officials, by order of Goodell, went to the Patriots' athletic facilities and proceeded to smash the tapes. The decision to destroy the tapes was controversial. Goodell said that he had come down hard on the Patriots because he felt Belichick's authority over football operations (Belichick was effectively the Patriots' general manager as well as head coach) was such that his decisions were "properly attributed" to the Patriots as well. Goodell said he considered suspending Belichick, but decided against it because he felt fining them and stripping them of a draft pick were "more effective" than a suspension.

==== Involvement in the 2011 NFL lockout ====
Outside of player conduct, Goodell is also known for his work in the 2011 NFL lockout. Prior to the start of the 2011 NFL season, Goodell worked with NFL owners and the NFLPA on settling the NFL lockout which ran from March 11 to August 5. During the lockout, at the request of some NFL teams, he held conference calls with season ticket holders where he discussed the collective bargaining agreement and conducted question-and-answer sessions on various NFL topics.

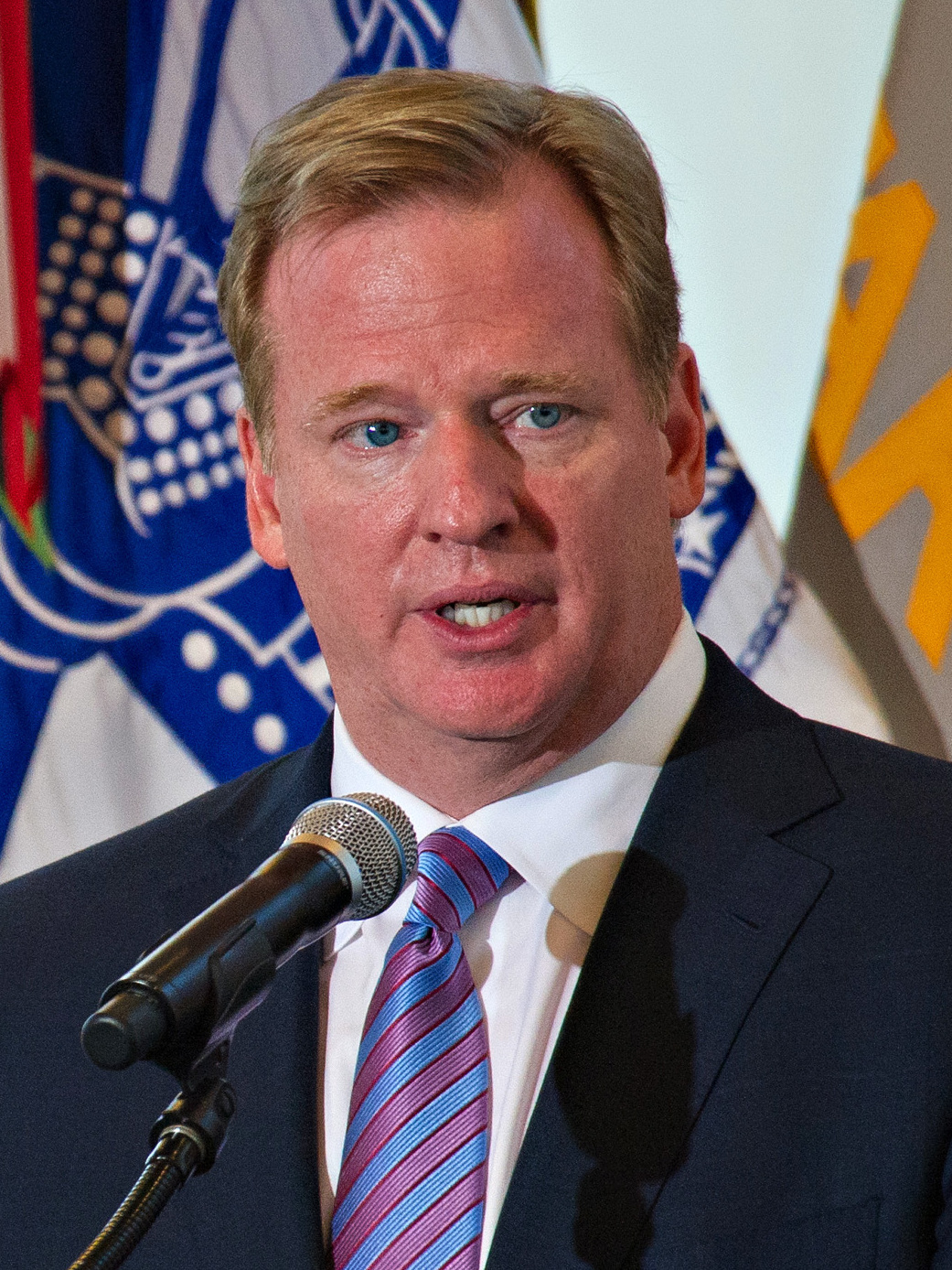
Goodell in 2012

==== Handling of Bountygate ====
In March 2012, Goodell revealed evidence that players and coaches on the New Orleans Saints had instituted a bounty program in which Saints defensive players were paid bonuses for deliberately knocking opposing players out of games. Then-defensive coordinator Gregg Williams administered the program, and as many as 27 Saints defensive players were involved. Later that month, Goodell handed down some of the harshest penalties in NFL history. He suspended Williams, who had left to become defensive coordinator of the St. Louis Rams, indefinitely (Williams was reinstated at the start of the 2013 season). Goodell also suspended head coach Sean Payton for the entire 2012 season, general manager Mickey Loomis for eight games and assistant head coach Joe Vitt for six games. Additionally, the Saints themselves were fined a league maximum $500,000 and had to forfeit their second round draft picks in 2012 and 2013. Goodell was particularly upset that those involved in the program lied about it during two separate league investigations of the program. Sanctions for players were not handed down at the time, and Goodell stated he would refrain from penalizing players until the NFLPA completed its investigation of the affair.

==== Replacement referees and involvement in the 2012 referee lockout ====
By June 2012, the league and the NFL Referees Association (NFLRA) had not yet come to terms on a new collective bargaining agreement, thus failing to resolve a labor dispute. Accordingly, the NFL locked out the regular NFL game officials and opened the 2012 season with replacement referees.

The replacement officials consisted of low-level college and high school officials. None were Division I college referees at the time since the league wanted to protect them from union backlash and let them continue working their scheduled games during the concurrent college football season. In addition, many of the top Division I conferences barred their officials from becoming replacements anyway because they employed current and former NFL referees as officiating supervisors.

The inexperience of the replacement referees generated criticism by writers and players. Referencing Goodell's aforementioned other actions as commissioner, the NFLPA issued a letter after Week 2 to the owners to end the dispute, saying:

It is lost on us as to how you allow a Commissioner to cavalierly issue suspensions and fines in the name of player health and safety yet permit the wholesale removal of the officials that you trained and entrusted to maintain that very health and safety. It has been reported that the two sides are apart by approximately $60,000 per team. We note that your Commissioner has fined an individual player as much in the name of "safety." Your actions are looking more and more like simple greed. As players, we see this game as more than the "product" you reference at times. You cannot simply switch to a group of cheaper officials and fulfill your legal, moral, and duty obligations to us and our fans. You need to end the lockout and bring back the officials immediately.

The Fail Mary was a direct result of the replacement referees during the 2012 NFL season. During the final play of a Week 2 game between the Green Bay Packers and Seattle Seahawks that occurred on September 24, 2012, at CenturyLink Field in Seattle, Washington, Packers safety M.D. Jennings intercepted a pass from Seahawks quarterback Russell Wilson in the endzone during a botched Hail Mary attempt with eight seconds left in the fourth quarter. However, the replacement referees ruled it a completion and a touchdown. The controversial ending followed weeks of criticism regarding the quality of officiating by replacement officials employed by the NFL during the 2012 NFL referee lockout.

==== Player brain damage lawsuits ====
Under Goodell's leadership, on August 30, 2013, the NFL reached a $765 million settlement with the former NFL players over head injuries. The settlement created a $675 million compensation fund from which former NFL players can collect from depending on the extent of their conditions. Severe conditions such as Lou Gehrig's disease and postmortem diagnosed chronic traumatic encephalopathy would be entitled to payouts as high as $5 million. From the remainder of the settlement, $75 million would be used for medical exams, and $10 million would be used for research and education. However, in January 2014, U.S. District Judge Anita B. Brody refused to accept the agreed settlement because "the money wouldn't adequately compensate the nearly 20,000 men not named in the suit". In 2014, the cap was removed from the amount.

==== Handling of Deflategate and Tom Brady suspension backlash ====
After the NFL suspended New England Patriots quarterback Tom Brady four games for his alleged awareness of team employees deflating footballs, as indicated in the Wells Report, the NFLPA filed an appeal of his suspension on May 14, 2015. Despite their request for a neutral third party arbitrator, the NFL announced that Goodell would preside over Brady's appeal hearing, which he did on June 23.

Goodell announced his upholding of the suspension on July 28, citing the destruction of Brady's cell phone as critical evidence that Brady "knew about, approved of, consented to, and provided inducements and rewards in support of a scheme by which, with Mr. Jastremski's support, Mr. McNally tampered with the game balls." The same day, the NFL filed papers in Manhattan federal court to confirm Goodell's upholding of the suspension. A day after the suspension was upheld, Brady and Patriots owner Robert Kraft made statements criticizing the league, with Brady stating that he was never "made aware at any time during Mr. Wells investigation, that failing to subject my cell phone to investigation would result in ANY discipline."

On August 4, U.S. District Judge Richard M. Berman ordered the transcript from Brady's appeal hearing released to the public. Writers quickly spotted contradictions between Goodell's statement and Brady's testimony, notably regarding increased phone conversations between Brady and team staffer John Jastremski in the weeks between the AFC Championship Game and Super Bowl XLIX. Dan Wetzel of Yahoo! Sports pointed out that while Goodell had stated in upholding the suspension that Brady claimed he only spoke with Jastremski about football preparations for the Super Bowl, which would be suspicious if correct due to the increase in communication, Brady had testified in the hearing that other topics, including the alleged deflation, were discussed. The NFL was also criticized for a conflict of interest at the hearing, as one of the lawyers who worked on the Wells Report, Lorin Reisner, cross-examined Brady during the hearing on behalf of the league; Ted Wells' independence in his investigation, as repeatedly asserted by the league, was also put to question, as he testified that NFL counsel Jeff Pash reviewed the report.

Berman vacated Brady's suspension on September 3, citing a lack of fair due process. Analysts criticized Goodell for his violation of due process in order to uphold an extreme punishment and his arrogance in presuming he superseded the NFL's rules. Wetzel stated that "Judge Berman didn't declare Brady innocent on Thursday; he declared the NFL guilty of violating federal law in trying to declare Brady guilty." Michael Hurley of CBS Boston pointed out that the NFL's case was centered on Article 46 of the league's Collective Bargaining Agreement (CBA), but Berman cited Article 46 as evidence that the league had used unfair process.

The NFL announced it would appeal Judge Berman's decision just hours after the suspension was overturned. The appeal hearing was held March 3, 2016. At the hearing the three-judge panel of the United States Court of Appeals for the Second Circuit scrutinized Players Association lawyer Jeffrey L. Kessler more intensely than NFL lawyer Paul Clement, with Circuit Judge Denny Chin even stating that "the evidence of ball tampering is compelling, if not overwhelming."

On April 25, 2016, the Second Circuit reinstated Brady's four-game suspension for the 2016 NFL season. Circuit Judge Barrington Daniels Parker, Jr., joined by Circuit Judge Chin, wrote that they could not "second-guess" the arbitration but were merely determining it "met the minimum legal standards established by the Labor Management Relations Act of 1947". Circuit Chief Judge Robert Katzmann dissented, writing that the NFL's fines for using stickum were "highly analogous" and that here "the Commissioner was doling out his own brand of industrial justice." On May 21, 2015, The Washington Post published an article that Goodell's efforts to harshly suspend Brady were "part of a personal power play", supporting public claims that he was simply trying to demonstrate authority within the league.

==== Suppression of US national anthem protests ====
On May 23, 2018, Commissioner Goodell and NFL owners approved a new policy requiring all players to stand during the national anthem or be given the option to stay in the locker room during the national anthem. Any players from an NFL team who protested the anthem while on the field would become subject to discipline from the league. In addition, the teams as a whole would be subject to punishment and other forms of discipline from the NFL as a result.

In light of the renewed Black Lives Matter protests after the murder of George Floyd at the hands of Minneapolis police, he recanted this position, encouraging players to speak their minds more freely.

==== Reaffirmation of diversity, equity and inclusion efforts ====
On February 3, 2025, Goodell reaffirmed his commitment to efforts at diversity, equity and inclusion at a press conference, where he said:

I believe that our diversity efforts have led to making the NFL better. It's been attracting better talent. We think we're better. We get different perspectives from people with different backgrounds, whether they're women or men or people of color, we make ourselves stronger, and we make ourselves better when we have that, and it's something that I think will have a tremendous impact on this league for many, many years. We always win on the field with the best talent and the best coaching, and I think the same is true off the field also.

==== Tradition of being booed at NFL draft ====
Goodell is booed every time he takes the stage at the NFL draft, a crowd reaction to him beginning in 2011. Goodell is reported to enjoy this tradition, even humorously inviting fans to boo him at the virtual 2020 NFL draft held during the coronavirus pandemic, with fans (including Michael Strahan) responding to his request by booing him on Zoom.

==== Football in the streaming era ====
In 2020, Goodell oversaw the first NFL game to air exclusively on streaming, with Amazon Prime broadcasting a San Francisco 49ers–Arizona Cardinals matchup on December 26. The game attracted 11.2 million viewers, and the 4.8 million viewers who logged on to watch the game marked the highest digital viewership for any regular-season football game. Super Bowl LVI aired on Peacock alongside NBC in February 2022. (Other Super Bowls have since been aired on the respective streaming services for the game's broadcast network, such as Paramount+ for CBS starting with Super Bowl LVIII in 2024 and Tubi for FOX in 2025). Hulu and Disney+ will broadcast Super Bowl LXI in February 2027.

In 2022, the league moved Thursday Night Football to Amazon Prime from NFL Network. That same year, the NFL+ app launched in July, allowing fans to watch live games, RedZone content, and on-demand NFL Network programming.

== Personal life ==
In October 1997, Goodell married former Fox News Channel anchor Jane Skinner. They have twin daughters, born in 2001. Goodell has four brothers: among them are Tim, a senior vice president for the Hess Corporation, and Michael, married to Jack Kenny, creator of the short-lived NBC series The Book of Daniel. The Webster family on the show was loosely based on the Goodell family. Goodell's cousin Andy Goodell was a former Republican party member of the New York State Assembly and executive of Chautauqua County, New York. The Goodell family has longstanding ties to Chautauqua Institution near Jamestown.

Goodell starred as himself in the NFL 100 commercial before Super Bowl LIII.
