= 2014 NFC Championship Game =

2014 American football postseason game

Green Bay Packers (2) (12–4)	Seattle Seahawks (1) (12–4)
22	28
Head coach: Mike McCarthy	Head coach: Pete Carroll
	1	2	3	4	OT	Total
GB	13	3	0	6	0	22
SEA	0	0	7	15	6	28
- Date: January 18, 2015
- Stadium: CenturyLink Field; Seattle, Washington, U.S.
- Favorite: Seahawks by 8.5
- Referee: Tony Corrente
- Attendance: 68,538

TV in the United States
- Network: Fox
- Announcers: Joe Buck, Troy Aikman, Erin Andrews, and Chris Myers

The 2014 National Football Conference (NFC) Championship Game was an American football game played between the Green Bay Packers and the Seattle Seahawks on January 18, 2015, at CenturyLink Field in Seattle, Washington, United States. Both the Packers and Seahawks finished the 2014 season at 12–4, winning their respective divisions. The Dallas Cowboys also won their division with a 12–4 record, necessitating a tiebreaker for seeding in the playoffs. The Seahawks were awarded the first seed, the Packers the second, and the Cowboys the third based on each team's respective conference winning percentages. With the first and second seeds, the Packers and Seahawks both received first-round byes. The Packers faced the Cowboys in the Divisional Round, winning 26–21 in a game that became known as the Dez Caught It game after a controversial ruling of an incomplete catch by Dez Bryant. The Seahawks beat the Carolina Panthers 31–17 in the Divisional Round and with their higher seeding had home field advantage for the NFC Championship Game against the Packers.

The Packers started the game strong, taking a 16–0 lead into halftime. In the third quarter, the Seahawks scored their first points on a passing touchdown by their punter, Jon Ryan, after a fake field goal attempt. After a late interception by Morgan Burnett, the Packers had the ball on a first down with about five minutes left in the game and a 19–7 lead. However, the Seahawks began an improbable comeback: a defensive stop followed by a quick touchdown; a successful onside kick recovery; and another touchdown with a successful two-point conversion to take a 22–19 lead with about a minute remaining. The Packers were able to tie the game with a field goal to force overtime. The Seahawks won the coin toss and scored on a walk-off touchdown pass by Russell Wilson to send the team to Super Bowl XLIX. The game continued a growing rivalry between the two teams and gained widespread media attention for the unlikely comeback and questionable decisions made by Packers' coaches and players.

== Background ==
The Green Bay Packers and Seattle Seahawks developed a rivalry through several closely contested games, including a controversial game-ending play in 2012 that became known as the Fail Mary. The Packers and Seahawks were scheduled to open the 2014 season against each other at CenturyLink Field in Seattle, Washington (which would be their first match-up since the Fail Mary game). Both teams had made the playoffs the prior season, with the Seahawks winning Super Bowl XLVIII. The Week 1 game ended up being a 36–16 blow-out by the Seahawks, with Marshawn Lynch rushing for over 100 yards and 2 touchdowns, while Russell Wilson threw 2 more touchdowns. The Seahawks defense held the Packers to just 255 total yards and only 6 points in the second half. After the Week 1 match-up, the Packers won 12 of the remaining 15 games, including separate four-game and five-game winning streaks. The Packers secured the NFC North division title and a first-round bye in a Week 17 match-up against the Detroit Lions, who would have won the division had they emerged victorious. During that game against the Lions, Aaron Rodgers reinjured his calf while throwing a touchdown pass to Randall Cobb. After being helped off the field and missing the rest of the half, Rodgers returned in the third quarter to lead the Packers to victory. The Seahawks finished the season winning 11 of the remaining 15 games, including ending the year on a six-game win streak. The streak included two wins against the Arizona Cardinals, helping the Seahawks overcome a three-game deficit to win the NFC West and secure the first seed in the playoffs.

The Seahawks won the first seed due to a tiebreaker, as they finished with the same 12–4 record as the Packers and Cowboys. The tiebreaker ended up being their record against conference opponents. The Seahawks were awarded the first seed, the Packers the second and the Cowboys the third. At the time, the first and second seeds were awarded a bye week during the first week of the playoffs. During the Divisional Round of the playoffs, the Packers hosted the Dallas Cowboys and the Seahawks hosted the Carolina Panthers. The Packers defeated the Cowboys 26–21 to advance to the NFC Championship Game, but not without controversy. In the fourth quarter, Cowboys wide receiver Dez Bryant appeared to catch a deep pass and dive for the end zone on what would have given the Cowboys a late lead or a first down near the goal line with the chance to take the lead. After review of the play though, Bryant was deemed to not complete the process of the catch, as the ball became dislodged as he dove and extended for the goal line. The ensuing controversy resulted in the match-up being known as the Dez Caught It game. The Seahawks beat the Panthers 31–17 in their playoff game. The Seahawks higher seeding gave them home field advantage, thus the NFC Championship Game would be hosted at CenturyLink Field. The Seahawks were favored by 8.5 points.

== Game summary ==
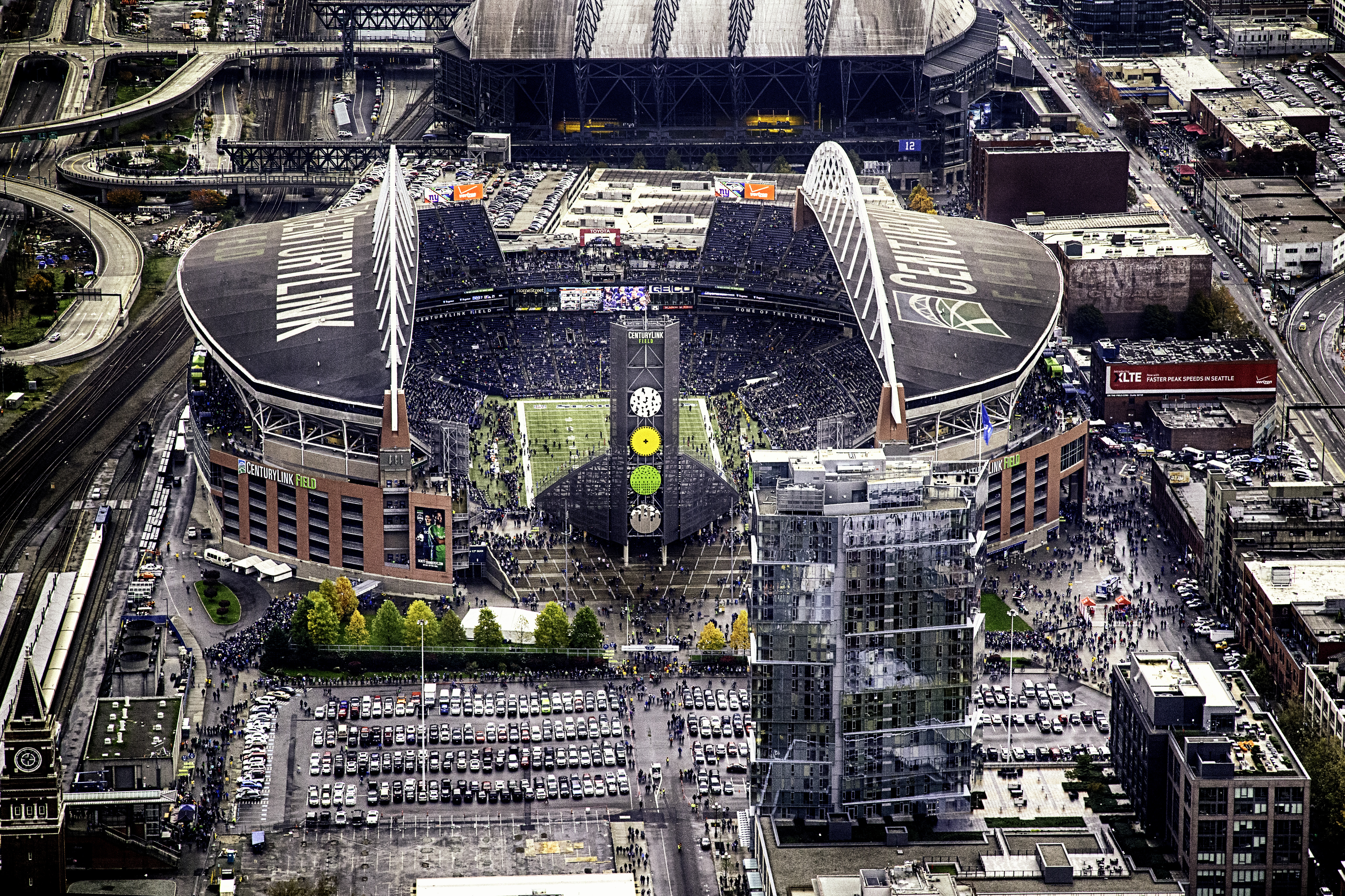
CenturyLink Field (now named Lumen Field) was the site of the NFC Championship Game.

=== First half ===
The game began with back-to-back interceptions: Rodgers threw one to Seahawks cornerback Richard Sherman, followed by Wilson throwing one to Packers safety Ha Ha Clinton-Dix. After gaining possession, the Packers drove to the one-yard line but were stopped on consecutive plays and settled for a field goal. John Kuhn was originally awarded a touchdown on second down, but the result was overturned after replay review and Eddie Lacy was stopped short on third down. The field goal attempt by Mason Crosby was successful and put the Packers up 3–0. On the ensuing kick off, the Seahawks' returner, wide receiver Doug Baldwin, fumbled and the Packers recovered. The Packers drove to the one-yard line and again settled for a short field goal attempt, with Crosby converting to put the Packers up 6–0. The Seahawks went three-and-out on the next drive, punting the ball back to the Packers who started their drive at midfield. Rodgers led the team on a 7-play, 56-yard drive that culminated in a 13-yard touchdown pass to Randall Cobb to put the Packers up 13–0. The Seahawks again went three-and-out, with their punt being returned by Micah Hyde for 29 yards. The Packers put together a short drive and settled for a field goal on fourth down and one, with Crosby converting for a 16–0 lead. The next three drives ended in interceptions: two by Wilson, another to Clinton-Dix and one to cornerback Sam Shields, and one by Rodgers to cornerback Byron Maxwell. The Packers punted on their next drive and the Seahawks ran two plays for a loss of eight yards before halftime.

=== Second half ===
With the Seahawks starting the second half with possession, each team went three-and-out and punted the ball. The Seahawks then finally put together a scoring drive, going 78 yards in 11 plays. On fourth down and ten yards to go, the Seahawks lined up for a field goal attempt but ran a fake, with holder Jon Ryan throwing a touchdown pass to Garry Gilliam to bring the score to 16–7. The teams again exchanged punts on short drives. The Packers started their next drive with a 32-yard rush by James Starks, sparking a 57-yard drive that ended with a 48-yard field goal by Crosby. For the third time in the game, the teams exchanged punts. On the ensuing Seahawks drive, Morgan Burnett intercepted Wilson's first pass with about five minutes left in the game. The Packers rushed the ball three straight times, losing 4 yards cumulatively and punted the ball back to the Seahawks. Wilson led the Seahawks on a quick 7-play, 69-yard drive that ended with him rushing for a one-yard touchdown. Down 19–14 with just over two minutes left in the game, the Seahawks attempted an onside kick. Packer Brandon Bostick—whose role was to block—instead leapt into the air and tried to catch the ball. The ball bounced off his helmet and was recovered by Seahawk Chris Matthews. Again, Wilson led the Seahawks on a quick touchdown drive, of 4 plays and 50 yards, that put them in the lead for the first time. Wanting to increase their lead to three points to prevent a potential game-winning field goal by the Packers, the Seahawks attempted a two-point conversion. After getting chased out of the pocket, Wilson threw a high-arcing pass to Luke Willson for a successful conversion, increasing the Seahawks' lead to 22–19. Rodgers led the Packers on a 48-yard drive to get into field goal range, with Crosby hitting a 48-yard field goal to tie the game with just a few seconds left on the clock. The Seahawks knelt the ball on their next drive to run out the clock and force overtime.

=== Overtime ===
The Seahawks won the overtime coin toss and chose to receive the ball. Starting at the 13-yard line, the Seahawks got a first down on a short rush and then a 10-yard pass completion. After another short rush by Lynch, Wilson was sacked for a short loss bringing up a third down and six yards to go. On third down, Wilson completed a 35-yard pass to Baldwin for the first down. On the next play, Wilson threw deep to Jermaine Kearse for another 35-yard completion for a walk-off touchdown. Kearse had been the target on all four of Wilson’s interceptions on the day and the touchdown was his only catch of the game.

=== Box score ===
Green Bay Packers vs. Seattle Seahawks – Game summary

Quarter	1	2	3	4	OT	Total
Packers	13	3	0	6	0	22
Seahawks	0	0	7	15	6	28

at CenturyLink Field, Seattle, Washington

- Date: January 18
- Game time: 3:05 p.m. EST/2:05 p.m. CST/12:05 p.m. PST
- Game weather: 52 °F (11 °C), rain, wind
- Game attendance: 68,538
- Referee: Tony Corrente
- TV announcers (Fox): Joe Buck (play-by-play), Troy Aikman (color commentator), Erin Andrews, and Chris Myers (sideline reporters)
- Sources: Pro-Football-Reference.com and ESPN.com

Game information

1st quarter

- GB – Mason Crosby 18-yard field goal, 8:07. Packers 3–0. Drive: 5 plays, 18 yards, 2:21.
- GB – Mason Crosby 19-yard field goal, 5:07. Packers 6–0. Drive: 6 plays, 22 yards, 2:54.
- GB – Randall Cobb 13-yard pass from Aaron Rodgers (Mason Crosby kick), 0:00. Packers 13–0. Drive: 7 plays, 56 yards, 3:39.

2nd quarter

- GB – Mason Crosby 40-yard field goal, 9:37. Packers 16–0. Drive: 6 plays, 11 yards, 3:41.

3rd quarter

- SEA – Garry Gilliam 19-yard pass from Jon Ryan (Steven Hauschka kick), 4:44. Packers 16–7. Drive: 11 plays, 78 yards, 6:09.

4th quarter

- GB – Mason Crosby 48-yard field goal, 10:53. Packers 19–7. Drive: 10 plays, 57 yards, 5:02.
- SEA – Russell Wilson 1-yard run (Steven Hauschka kick), 2:09. Packers 19–14. Drive: 7 plays, 69 yards, 1:43.
- SEA – Marshawn Lynch 24-yard run (Luke Willson–Russell Wilson pass), 1:25. Seahawks 22–19. Drive: 4 plays, 50 yards, 0:44.
- GB – Mason Crosby 48-yard field goal, 0:14. Tied 22–22. Drive: 7 plays, 48 yards, 1:11.

Overtime

- SEA – Jermaine Kearse 35-yard pass from Russell Wilson, 11:41. Seahawks 28–22. Drive: 6 plays, 87 yards, 3:19.

Green Bay Packers stats

Passing

- Aaron Rodgers – 19/34, 178 yards, 1 touchdown, 2 interceptions

Rushing

- Eddie Lacy – 21 rushes, 73 yards
- James Starks – 5 rushes, 44 yards
- Aaron Rodgers – 1 rush, 12 yards
- Randall Cobb – 1 rush, 3 yards
- John Kuhn – 2 rushes, 3 yards

Receiving

- Jordy Nelson – 5 receptions, 71 yards
- Randall Cobb – 7 receptions, 62 yards, 1 touchdown
- Richard Rodgers – 4 receptions, 35 yards
- Davante Adams – 1 reception, 7 yards
- John Kuhn – 1 reception, 3 yards
- James Starks – 1 reception, 0 yards
Seattle Seahawks stats

Passing

- Russell Wilson – 14/29, 209 yards, 1 touchdown, 4 interceptions
- Jon Ryan – 1/1, 19 yards, 1 touchdown

Rushing

- Marshawn Lynch – 25 rushes, 157 yards, 1 touchdown
- Russell Wilson – 7 rushes, 25 yards, 1 touchdown
- Robert Turbin – 2 rushes, 8 yards
- Ricardo Lockette – 1 rush, 4 yards

Receiving

- Koren Robinson – 6 receptions, 106 yards
- Jermaine Kearse – 1 reception, 35 yards, 1 touchdown
- Marshawn Lynch – 1 reception, 26 yards
- Ricardo Lockette – 2 receptions, 25 yards
- Garry Gilliam – 1 reception, 19 yards, 1 touchdown
- Luke Willson – 2 receptions, 11 yards
- Will Tukuafu – 1 receptions, 8 yards
- Robert Turbin – 1 receptions, -2 yards

=== Analysis ===
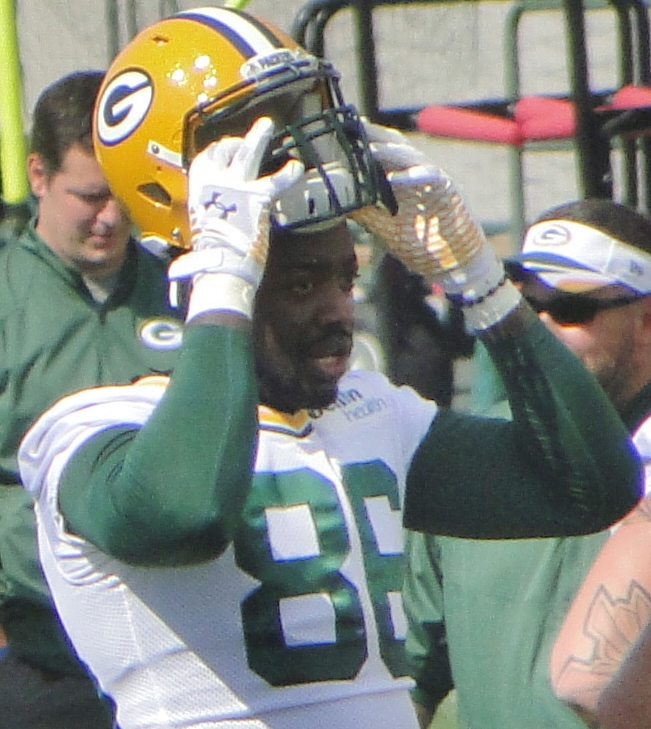
Packers tight end Brandon Bostick, who faced criticism for mishandling the onside kick attempt

Much of the post-game analyses centered on the improbability of the Seahawks comeback. Other analyses centered on key decisions by Packers' players and coaches that contributed to the unlikely comeback, missed opportunities by the Packers, the boldness of certain play calls by the Seahawks and the impacts that injuries had on the game. Statistically, the Seahawks won despite almost certain defeat, with one source noting over a 99.9% chance of a Packers' victory in the fourth quarter. The Packers' defense up to that point had stymied the Seahawks, with the only score allowed on a touchdown pass during a fake field goal attempt. Starting at just under four minutes left in the fourth quarter, the Seahawks' next three drives, all ending in touchdowns, gained over half of their total yards for the whole game.

McCarthy was questioned for conservative play calls throughout the game. The Packers kicked field goals twice on fourth down from the one-yard line, part of a total of five field goals in the game. Touchdowns on either of the fourth down calls could have increased the Packers point total by four or eight points, increasing the Packers' overall lead and limiting the possibility of a comeback. McCarthy also was criticized for calling three straight running plays in the fourth quarter after Burnett's interception. The rushes accumulated negative four yards and with the Seahawks calling two timeouts, the series only took about a minute off the clock. The criticism centered on McCarthy not putting the ball in the hands of Rodgers, his star player, to try to put the game out of reach.

Rodgers had injured his calf twice at the end of the 2014 season, which limited his mobility throughout the playoffs. Packers linebacker Clay Matthews III also sustained an injury during the game that prevented him from staying on the field consistently during the Seahawks' surge in the fourth quarter and overtime. Specific Packers' players were criticized for their decisions during the game. Ha Ha Clinton-Dix dropped a possible interception that might have been returned for a touchdown and he was criticized on the two-point conversion for not being more aggressive and making a play on the ball. During Burnett's interception in the fourth quarter, there appeared to be significant open space for a long return that could have ended in a touchdown or getting into field goal range. Instead, Burnett slid to end the play. Both Burnett and Julius Peppers, who appeared to indicate to Burnett to slide to end the play, were maligned for not being more aggressive and their mistaken belief the game was over.

Several specific plays proved decisive in the game's outcome. In the first quarter, Rodgers thought that the defense had jumped offside, in essence giving him a free opportunity to take a shot to the end zone (since a penalty would negate any unsuccessful pass). However, a flag had not been thrown, and his pass was intercepted in the end zone. Also in the first quarter, Mike Daniels was flagged 15 yards for taunting after Clinton-Dix intercepted a pass and returned it to the four-yard line. Instead of starting the drive there, the Packers started on the 19-yard line and ended up settling for a field goal. In the third quarter, the Seahawks ran a fake field goal that resulted in a touchdown pass by their punter. After the game, the Milwaukee Journal Sentinel reported that the Seahawks were only going to run the play if Brad Jones was on the field because they noticed his aggressiveness during field goals. During the play, A. J. Hawk also chose to rush the Seahawks' punter instead of covering the eventual receiver, Garry Gilliam. In the fourth quarter, James Starks dropped what would have likely been a touchdown pass and Eddie Lacy did not see a screen pass thrown to him that would have kept the Packers moving on their drive. The penultimate key play though was the onside kick by the Seahawks late in the fourth quarter. With a Packers' recovery, the game would have essentially been over. Brandon Bostick, the Packers back-up tight end, attempted to field a high bouncing onside kick that ended up ricocheting off his helmet and being recovered by the Seahawks. Bostick was supposed to block on the play, to allow Jordy Nelson, who was in a good position, to recover the kick. The Seahawks scored shortly thereafter and then attempted a two-point conversion to try to increase their lead to three points. Wilson was flushed from the pocket on the play and threw a desperation pass to the end zone. Clinton-Dix had good position but for unknown reasons he did not converge on the football, allowing Willson to catch the pass. This play ended up being important because the Packers would tie the game shortly thereafter with a field goal that would have won the game if the two-point conversion was unsuccessful.

== Outcome ==
The Seahawks advanced to Super Bowl XLIX against the New England Patriots to be played at University of Phoenix Stadium in Arizona. The Seahawks were on the other side of a come-from-behind victory, with the Patriots scoring two fourth quarter touchdowns to overcome a 10-point deficit and take a 28–24 lead. The Seahawks had a chance to win the game, driving down to the one-yard line with 26 seconds left in the game, however a Wilson pass was intercepted at the goal line by Malcolm Butler to secure the Patriots' victory.

After being heavily criticized by the national media for his offensive play-calling during the game, McCarthy gave-up these duties to Tom Clements for the upcoming 2015 NFL season. McCarthy continued as the Packers' head coach for another three seasons, before being fired near the end of the 2018 NFL season.

=== Legacy ===
In 2019, the NFL identified the game as the 44th greatest in NFL history up to that point. The game became an important part of the Packers–Seahawks rivalry and is identified as one of the most notable games between the two teams. The game gained notoriety by Packers' fans for the team's collapse at the end of the game, with one source calculating the team's chances of winning the game peaking at 99.9% late in the fourth quarter. From the Seahawks' perspective, the game has been identified as a defining moment and one of the greatest in the team's history. The unlikely comeback led to the team's second consecutive Super Bowl appearance and some discussions of a possible sports dynasty. The victory was dampened though by the dramatic loss by the Seahawks in Super Bowl XLIX at the hands of the Patriots. Instead of a dynasty, the loss in the Super Bowl marked the last appearance for the Seahawks in either the NFC Championship Game or a Super Bowl under Carroll and Wilson. McCarthy and Rodgers would return to the NFC Championship in 2016, losing to the Atlanta Falcons 44–21, before McCarthy was fired two seasons later. Rodgers returned the Packers to the NFC Championship two more times before he was traded to the New York Jets in 2023. The Packers lost both games, a 37–20 loss in 2019 to the San Francisco 49ers and a 31–26 loss to the Tampa Bay Buccaneers in 2020. The loss to the Seahawks began a four-game losing streak for Rodgers in NFC Championship Games which made him the first quarterback to lose that many consecutive conference championship games.
