= Packers–Seahawks rivalry =

American National Football League rivalry

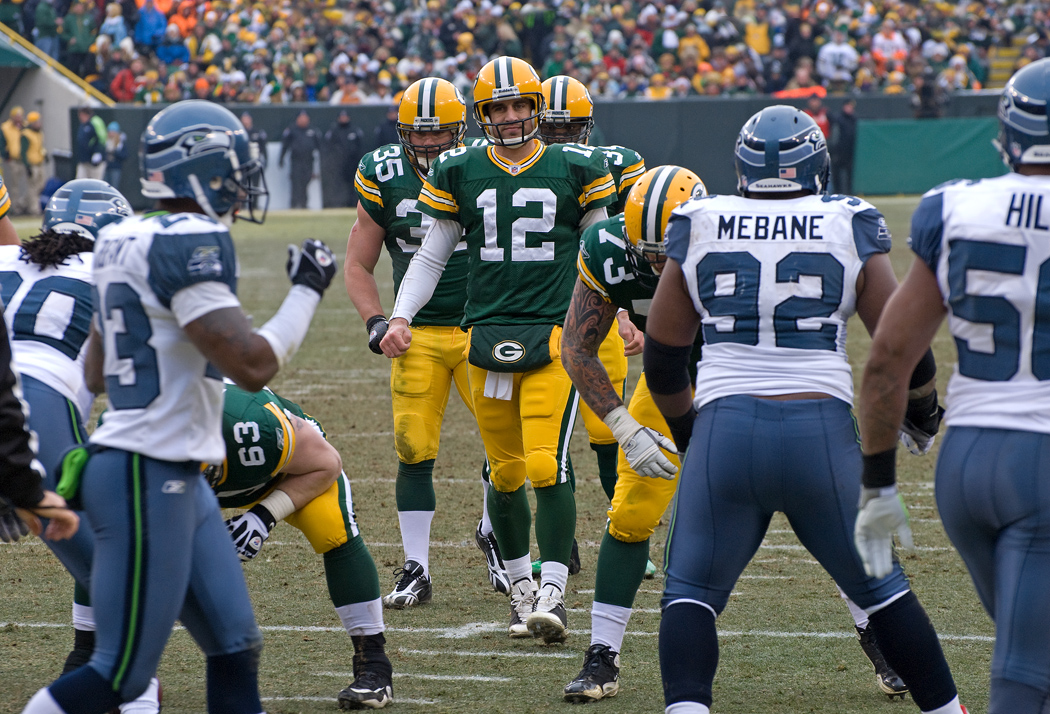
- Packers' Aaron Rodgers (#12) lining up against Seahawks' Brandon Mebane (#92) in a 2009 game.

- Green Bay Packers Seattle Seahawks
- Location: Green Bay, Seattle
- First meeting: October 10, 1976; Packers 27, Seahawks 20
- Latest meeting: December 15, 2024; Packers 30, Seahawks 13
- Next meeting: TBD (no later than the 2027 regular season)
- Stadiums: Packers: Lambeau Field; Seahawks: Lumen Field

Statistics
- Total meetings: 25
- All-time series: Packers: 16–9
- Regular season series: Packers: 13–8
- Postseason results: Packers: 3–1
- Largest victory: Packers: 48–10 (2009); Seahawks: 27–7 (1999), 36–16 (2014)
- Most points scored: Packers: 48 (2009); Seahawks: 36 (2014)
- Longest win streak: Packers: 3 (1976–1981, 2003–2006, 2008–2009, 2015–2017, 2019-present); Seahawks: 3 (1984–1990, 2012–2015)
- Current win streak: Packers: 3 (2019–present)

Post-season history
- 2003 NFC Wild Card: Packers won: 33–27 (OT); 2007 NFC Divisional: Packers won: 42–20; 2014 NFC Championship: Seahawks won: 28–22 (OT); 2019 NFC Divisional: Packers won: 28–23

The Packers–Seahawks rivalry is an American football rivalry between the Green Bay Packers and Seattle Seahawks. The Packers entered the National Football League (NFL) in 1921 and saw significant periods of sustained success under Curly Lambeau in the 1930s and 1940s, as well as in the 1960s under Vince Lombardi. However, the Packers entered the 1970s in a sustained slump. They only made the playoffs once from 1968 to 1975. The Seahawks entered the NFL in 1976 as part of an agreement to expand the league after the AFL–NFL merger. The Packers and Seahawks played their first game during the 1976 NFL season, with the Packers winning 27–20 at Milwaukee County Stadium. During the 1970s, 1980s, and 1990s, the two teams only played each other intermittently, as they were in different conferences. However, this changed in 2002 when the Seahawks were moved from the American Football Conference (AFC) to the National Football Conference (NFC). Teams playing in the same conference compete against each other in the regular season at least every three years and may meet more often if they share common positions in their respective division or are paired in the playoffs.

The rivalry between the two teams grew stronger after they became NFC foes. They met for the first time in the playoffs during the 2003 NFL season, an overtime 33–27 Packers' victory that occurred after Seahawks' quarterback Matt Hasselbeck exclaimed "We want the ball and we're going to score!" after winning the overtime coin toss—which was inadvertently broadcast on a referee's microphone—only to throw an interception on which the Packers capitalized. Both teams maintained consistent success throughout the 2000s, 2010s and into the 2020s, with the Packers winning Super Bowl XLV and the Seahawks winning Super Bowl XLVIII. They each sustained high-quality quarterback play as well, with Brett Favre and then Aaron Rodgers leading the Packers, and Hasselbeck and then Russell Wilson leading the Seahawks. The teams met in the playoffs three more times during this era, with the Packers winning two. The lone Seahawks' postseason victory was the 2014 NFC Championship Game, in which Seattle won after an improbable comeback in the fourth quarter. The rivalry has been defined by these high-profile postseason games, as well as some controversy. In 2012, the teams competed in what became known as the Fail Mary game. With replacement officials refereeing the game due to the 2012 NFL referee lockout, the Packers controversially lost on a walk-off Hail Mary pass by Russell Wilson. The ensuing controversy may have led to the end of the lockout and the return of the referees. As of the 2026 NFL season, the Packers lead the overall series 16–9, including winning three of four postseason games. The Packers and Seahawks most recent game was on December 15, 2024, with the Packers winning 30–13.

== Pre-rivalry history ==
=== Green Bay Packers (1919–1975) ===
The Green Bay Packers were founded in 1919 by Curly Lambeau and George Whitney Calhoun. After a few years of playing local teams, the Packers entered the National Football League (NFL) in 1921. Between 1929 and 1944, the Packers dominated the NFL, winning six championships and reaching the playoffs two other times. The advent of the forward pass under coach Curly Lambeau and wide receiver Don Hutson revolutionized the way football was played. After the retirement of Hutson and the eventual departure of Lambeau to the Chicago Cardinals, the Packers experienced 15 years of poor results from 1945 to 1959. However, with the hiring of Vince Lombardi, the Packers saw a revival, making the playoffs eight straight seasons and winning five championships, including the first two Super Bowls. After Lombardi departed for the Washington Redskins in 1969, the Packers again experienced a prolonged period of poor results, only making the playoffs once from 1968 to 1975.

=== Seattle Seahawks ===
As part of the AFL–NFL merger, it was agreed that the NFL would expand by two teams. The Seattle Seahawks and Tampa Buccaneers became these two expansion franchises, both of whom had their inaugural season in 1976. The Seahawks started in the NFC West, but only played there for one season before being moved to the AFC West.

== Overview ==
=== Early years ===
After the Seahawks entered the NFL as an expansion team, they only played the Packers eight times from 1976 to 2002. The Packers won the first three match-ups, while the Seahawks won the next three and the series stayed tied 4–4 by 2002. Neither team saw much success in the 1970s and 1980s, with the Seahawks not winning their first division title until 1988. The Packers only made the playoffs once from 1976 to 1992. However, in the 1990s the Packers saw sustained success under head coach Mike Holmgren, quarterback Brett Favre and defensive end Reggie White. The team appeared in two Super Bowls that decade, including a victory in Super Bowl XXXI. The Seahawks meanwhile saw little success after their division title in 1988, as they failed to make the playoffs again until 1999. Coincidentally, that season was the first for the Seahawks after they lured Holmgren from the Packers to serve as their general manager and head coach.

=== 2000s ===
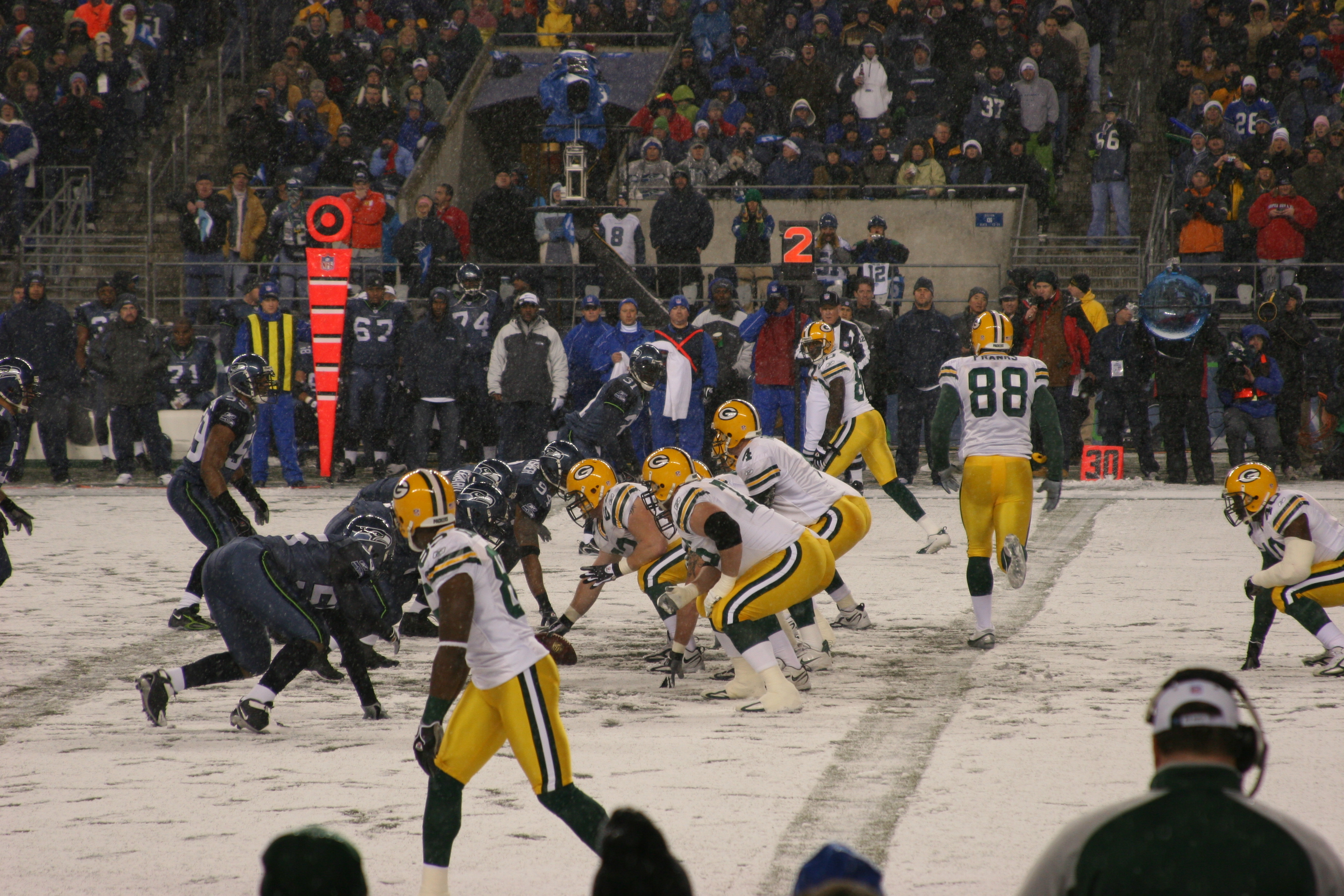
The Seahawks hosted the Packers in a 2006 game that saw snow fall for the first time during a Seahawks home game.

The rivalry between the teams began in the 2000s. In 2001, the Seahawks traded with the Packers for quarterback Matt Hasselbeck, who had served as Favre's back-up quarterback for two seasons. Starting with the 2002 NFL season, the Seahawks were moved from the AFC West back to the NFC West as part of a larger league realignment. Being in the same conference pitted the two teams against each other more often, including setting the stage for postseason match-ups. In 2003, the teams met for the first time as conference rivals, with the Packers winning 35–13 during the regular season. That same season, both teams made the playoffs and met in a Wild Card playoff game at Lambeau Field, which became notable after Seahawks quarterback Matt Hasselbeck exclaimed "we want the ball and we're going to score!" after winning the overtime coin toss. The referee's microphone was still on and picked up this comment for the national television audience and stadium fans to hear. Hasselbeck ended up throwing an interception to Al Harris, who returned it for a touchdown and the win. Harris' walk-off touchdown was the first defensive score in overtime to end a playoff game and was ranked as one of the 100 greatest plays and games in NFL history.

The Packers dominated the rivalry in the 2000s, winning six of seven match-ups. This included two games that became notable for snowy weather. In 2006, the Seahawks hosted the Packers in a Monday Night Football game that looked more like Lambeau Field. For the first time in their history, the Seahawks hosted a game with snow actively falling. A year later, the Packers hosted the Seahawks in a Divisional Playoff game. The game, which has been referred to as the Snow Globe Game, was notable both for the snowy weather and for the Packers comeback. Down 14–0 within the first five minutes of the game after two Ryan Grant fumbles resulted in Seahawks touchdowns, the Packers responded by outscoring the Seahawks 42–6 the rest of the game to secure the victory.

=== 2010s ===
"Seattle and Green Bay were two of the premier teams in the 2010s especially, and we had some battles over the years. There was a great rivalry and we couldn’t seem to beat them other than in the ‘Fail Mary‘ game in Seattle. They couldn’t beat us in Green Bay."

— Aaron Rodgers, Packers quarterback

The rivalry was evenly matched in the 2010s, with each team winning four games. However, this decade saw a number of notable games and controversy. The decade began with what became known as the Fail Mary game, a Week 3 regular season match-up in Seattle during the 2012 NFL season. The 2012 NFL referee lockout began at the start of the season, with the NFL fielding replacement officials for the first three weeks, which included this game. The Packers led a low-scoring affair 12–7 with under a minute left in the game and the Seahawks having possession. Rookie quarterback Russell Wilson threw a Hail Mary pass into the end zone as time expired. One official signaled a touchdown, while another signaled an interception. After replay review, the officials deemed the play a simultaneous catch by Seahawks' wide receiver Golden Tate and Packers safety M. D. Jennings, with the touchdown giving the Seahawks the victory. The resulting outcry and controversy was noted as the catalyst for the NFL and its referees to end the lockout the next week. Wilson had won the starting quarterback job that season over Matt Flynn, who was signed by the Seahawks from the Packers after Flynn served as Packers quarterback Aaron Rodgers's back-up.

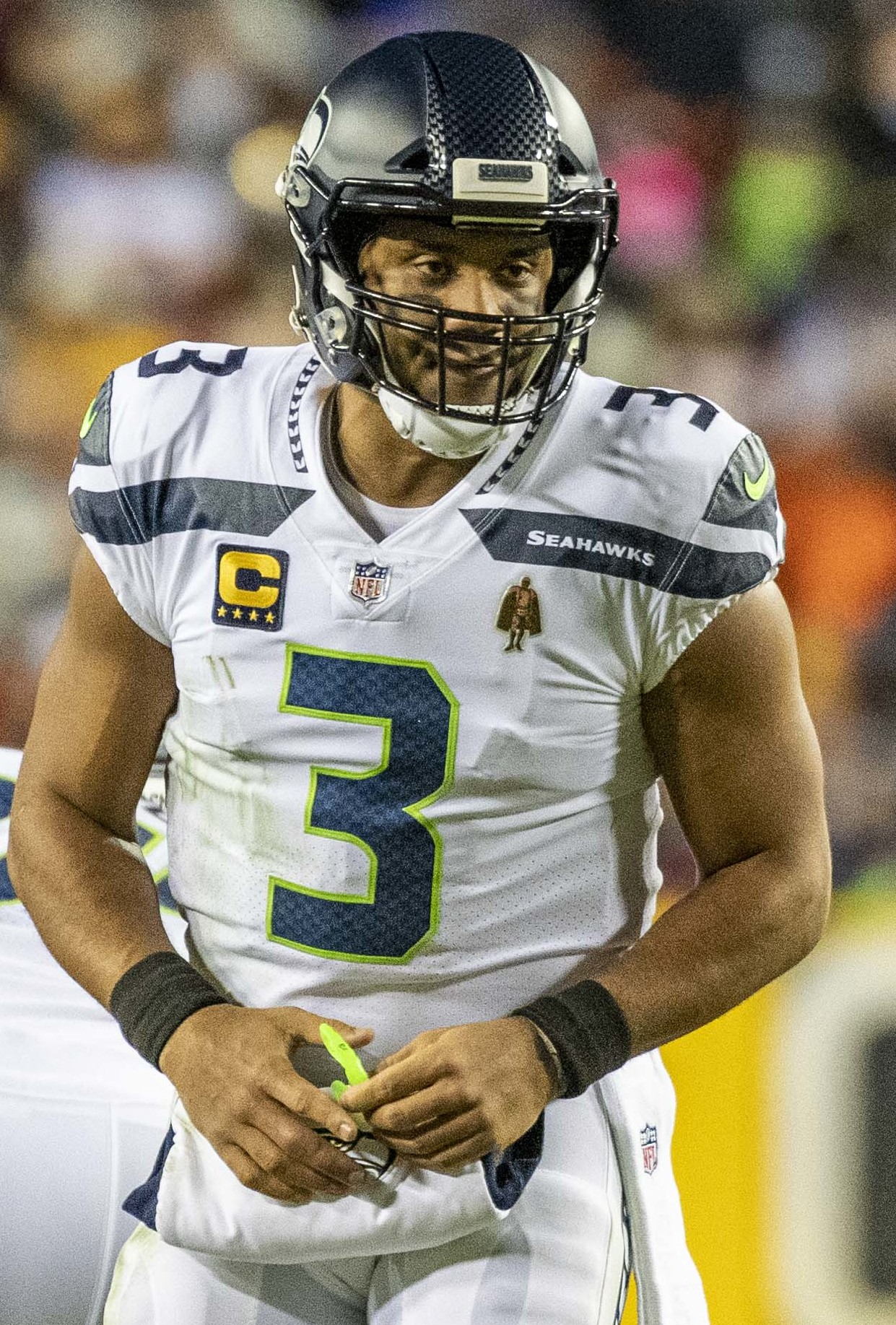
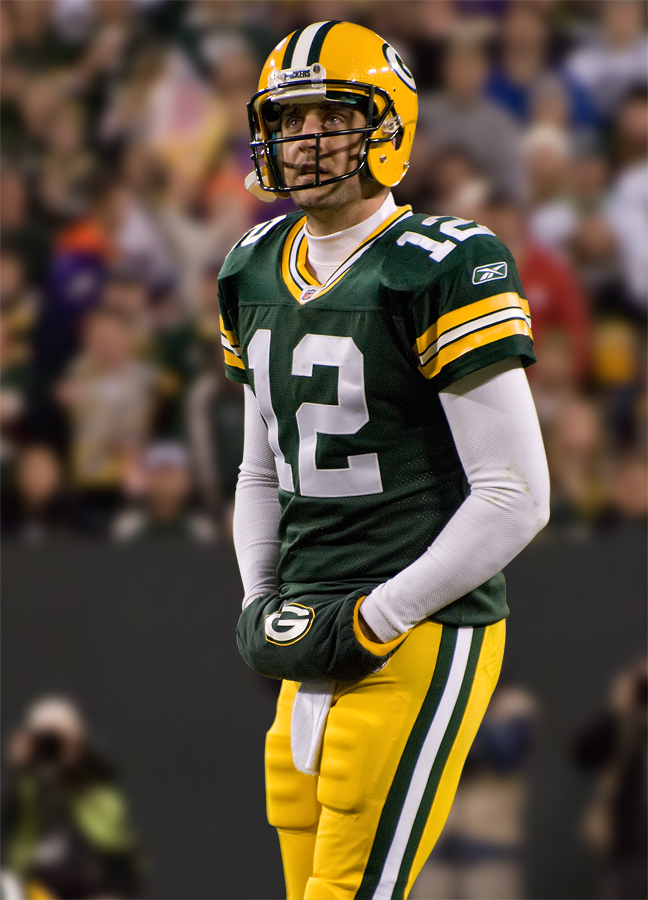
Quarterbacks Russell Wilson (left) and Aaron Rodgers (right) would lead the rivalry between the Seahawks and the Packers during the 2010s.

The Fail Mary game began a three-game win streak for the Seahawks against the Packers, which culminated in the 2014 NFC Championship Game. In this game, the Packers took a 19–7 lead deep into the fourth quarter, with the Seahawks only points coming from a touchdown pass from the team's punter during a fake field goal attempt. The Seahawks overcame the deficit with two late scores, including an onside kick recovery and a two-point conversion. After completing a 35-yard pass for a first down in overtime, Wilson threw another deep pass, again for 35 yards, for the game-winning touchdown, sending the Seahawks to Super Bowl XLIX.

After this loss, the Packers won four of the next five match-ups, culminating in a victory in the 2019 Divisional playoffs. In that game, the Packers were able to hold off another Seahawks comeback, running out the clock on two third-down conversions at the end of the game. Years later, after Rodgers had left the Packers for the New York Jets and Wilson had left the Seahawks for the Denver Broncos, Rodgers reflected on his games against Seattle as a "great rivalry", saying "[Russell Wilson] and I have had some battles over the years ... We couldn't seem to beat them … in Seattle. They couldn't beat us in Green Bay."

=== 2020s ===
The Packers won the most recent match-up between the two teams by a score of 30–13 in a 2024 regular season game.

=== Notable games ===
The two teams' rivalry has been characterized by numerous dramatic finishes and high-profile games:

- Packers 33, Seahawks 27 (January 4, 2004) – This Wild Card playoff game is known for Seahawks quarterback Matt Hasselbeck's remark in overtime. The teams had their first postseason match-up in the 2003–04 NFL playoffs, at Lambeau Field. The game saw numerous lead changes, and after a missed field goal attempt by the Packers at the end of the fourth quarter, the teams were tied 27–27. In overtime, the Seahawks won the coin toss. Hasselbeck (a former Packer) told the microphoned referee, and thus the crowd and the national television audience "We want the ball and we're going to score!" After each team went three-and-out, cornerback Al Harris intercepted a Hasselbeck pass and returned it for the winning touchdown. In honor of the league's 100th anniversary, the NFL compiled lists of the greatest games and plays, with this game and Harris' interception were ranked as the 72nd and 86 greatest, respectively. Harris was named the NFL Defensive Player of the Week for his interception returned for a touchdown, which was the first defensive touchdown to win an overtime playoff game in NFL history.

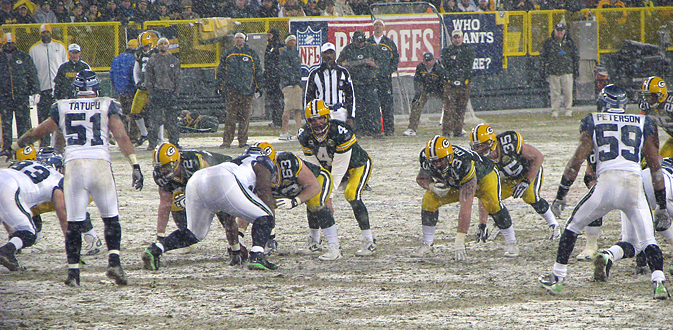
Brett Favre about to snap the ball during the Snow Globe Game.

- Packers 42, Seahawks 20 (January 12, 2008) – Sometimes referred to as the Snow Globe Game, in the 2007–08 NFL playoffs the Packers and Seahawks met again for a postseason match-up at Lambeau Field. The Seahawks jumped out to a 14–0 lead in under five minutes in the 1st quarter, recovering two fumbles on consecutive drives by Packers running back Ryan Grant and scoring a touchdown each time. The Packers defense, however, only gave up two Seahawks field goals for the rest of the game. Grant went on to rush 27 times for 201 yards and scored three touchdowns; his 201 rushing yards set a team postseason record. Quarterback Brett Favre also threw for three touchdowns as the Packers beat the Seahawks 42–20. A large snowstorm dumped about two inches of snow during the game, with the Green Bay Press-Gazette saying that "Lambeau Field turned into a snow globe".
- Seahawks 14, Packers 12 (September 24, 2012) – In Week 3 of the 2012 season, the teams played at the Seahawks' CenturyLink Field. It is remembered for the controversial last play, dubbed the "Fail Mary". Replacement officials were being used due to the 2012 NFL referee lockout. With the Packers leading 12–7 and only eight seconds left, Seattle rookie quarterback Russell Wilson threw a desperation Hail Mary pass into the end zone. Packers safety M. D. Jennings and Seahawks wide receiver Golden Tate both jumped for the ball, and both maintained some contact with it in the air and upon landing on the ground. The two officials near the play conferred and then simultaneously made different signals, with one raising his arms to signal a touchdown, while the other waved his arms to signal stoppage of the clock. Eventually, it was declared a touchdown, with Jennings and Tate ruled to have simultaneous possession (which is decided in favor of the offensive player), giving the Seahawks the win. Following the game, the NFL released an official statement that acknowledged that a pass interference penalty should have been called on Tate. Also, several of the regular NFL officials stated they would have ruled it an interception. The referee lockout ended a few days after the game, with NFL Commissioner Roger Goodell stating that the reaction by fans, players, and the media after the Fail Mary game "may have pushed the parties further along" in their contract negotiations.
- Seahawks 28, Packers 22 (January 18, 2015) – The Packers travelled to Seattle for the 2014 NFC Championship Game. Seattle was trying to repeat as Super Bowl champions, having defeated the Denver Broncos in Super Bowl XLVIII 43–8 the year before. However, Russell Wilson started poorly and his team was down 16–0 at halftime. Trailing 19–7 with less than three minutes left, Wilson ran for a touchdown. Then, after a successful onside kick, Marshawn Lynch rushed for another touchdown, giving his team its first lead. Ahead 20–19, the Seahawks elected to go for a two-point conversion; Wilson came under pressure and was chased out of the pocket, but managed to loft a high, arcing pass to tight end Luke Willson, who took the ball into the end zone. That successful conversion proved to be crucial, as Packers quarterback Aaron Rodgers had enough time to drive down the field for a tying field goal. In overtime, Seattle won the coin toss, and Wilson threw a game-winning touchdown pass to Jermaine Kearse on the first possession.
- Packers 28, Seahawks 23 (January 12, 2020) – The Seahawks travelled to Green Bay for an NFC Divisional playoff game. The Packers took a 21−3 into halftime after a 20-yard touchdown pass from Aaron Rodgers to Davante Adams and two rushing touchdowns by Aaron Jones. The Seahawks fought back in the second half, scoring three touchdowns, while holding the Packers to just seven second-half points on another touchdown pass to Adams. After the last touchdown, the Seahawks two-point conversion failed, keeping the Packers' lead at 28–23. The Seahawks got the ball back but were forced to punt with just over two minutes left in the game. The Packers were able to run out the clock, converting twice on third down.

== Game results ==
As of the 2026 NFL season, the Seahawks and Packers have played each other 25 times, with the Packers leading the series 16–9. As the home team, the Packers are 13–3, and the Seahawks are 6–3. The Seahawks and Packers have played each other four times in the postseason; the Packers lead 3–1, with the home team winning every postseason game.

Green Bay Packers vs. Seattle Seahawks season-by-season results
1970s (Packers, 2–0)

Season	Results	Location	Overall series	Notes
1976	Packers; 27–20	Milwaukee County Stadium	Packers; 1–0	
1978	Packers; 45–28	Milwaukee County Stadium	Packers; 2–0	

1980s (Seahawks, 2–1)

Season	Results	Location	Overall series	Notes
1981	Packers; 34–24	Lambeau Field	Packers; 3–0	
1984	Seahawks; 24–13	Milwaukee County Stadium	Packers; 3–1	
1987	Seahawks; 24–22	Kingdome	Packers; 3–2	

1990s (Seahawks, 2–1)

Season	Results	Location	Overall series	Notes
1990	Seahawks; 30–24	Milwaukee County Stadium	Tied; 3–3	
1996	Packers; 30–24	Kingdome	Packers; 4–3	
1999	Seahawks; 27–7	Lambeau Field	Tied; 4–4	

2000s (Packers, 6–1)

Season	Results	Location	Overall series	Notes
2003	Packers; 35–13	Lambeau Field	Packers; 5–4	
2003 playoffs	Packers 33–27 (OT)	Lambeau Field	Packers 6–4	NFC Wild Card playoffs, "We want the ball and we're going to score!" game.
2005	Packers; 23–17	Lambeau Field	Packers; 7–4	
2006	Seahawks; 34–24	Qwest Field	Packers; 7–5	
2007 playoffs	Packers 42–20	Lambeau Field	Packers 8–5	NFC Divisional playoffs, Snow Globe Game.
2008	Packers; 27–17	Qwest Field	Packers; 9–5	
2009	Packers; 48–10	Lambeau Field	Packers; 10–5	

2010s (Tied, 4–4)

Season	Results	Location	Overall series	Notes
2012	Seahawks; 14–12	CenturyLink Field	Packers; 10–6	Fail Mary game.
2014	Seahawks; 36–16	CenturyLink Field	Packers; 10–7	
2014 playoffs	Seahawks 28–22 (OT)	CenturyLink Field	Packers 10–8	NFC Championship Game.
2015	Packers; 27–17	Lambeau Field	Packers; 11–8	
2016	Packers; 38–10	Lambeau Field	Packers; 12–8	
2017	Packers; 17–9	Lambeau Field	Packers; 13–8	
2018	Seahawks; 27–24	CenturyLink Field	Packers; 13–9	
2019 playoffs	Packers 28–23	Lambeau Field	Packers 14–9	NFC Divisional playoffs.

2020s (Packers, 2–0)

Season	Results	Location	Overall series	Notes
2021	Packers; 17–0	Lambeau Field	Packers; 15–9	
2024	Packers; 30–13	Lumen Field	Packers; 16–9	

Summary of results

Season	Season series	at Green Bay Packers	at Seattle Seahawks	Notes
Regular season	Packers 13–8	Packers 10–3	Seahawks 5–3	
Postseason	Packers 3–1	Packers 3–0	Seahawks 1–0	NFC Wild Card playoffs: 2003; NFC Divisional playoffs: 2007, 2019; NFC Championship Game: 2014
Regular and postseason	Packers 16–9	Packers 13-3	Seahawks 6–3	Packers have a 2–2 record in Milwaukee and currently have an 11–1 record in Green Bay.

== See also ==
- NFL rivalries
