= 2003 NFC Wild Card playoff game (Seattle–Green Bay) =

2004 American football postseason game

2003 NFC Wild Card Playoff Game
Seattle Seahawks (5) (10–6)	Green Bay Packers (4) (10–6)
27	33
Head coach: Mike Holmgren	Head coach: Mike Sherman
	1	2	3	4	OT	Total
SEA	3	3	14	7	0	27
GB	0	13	0	14	6	33
- Date: January 4, 2004
- Stadium: Lambeau Field; Green Bay, Wisconsin, U.S.
- Favorite: Packers by 7
- Referee: Bernie Kukar
- Attendance: 71,457

TV in the United States
- Network: Fox
- Announcers: Joe Buck, Troy Aikman, and Cris Collinsworth

The 2003 National Football Conference (NFC) Wild Card playoff game was a National Football League (NFL) playoff game between the Seattle Seahawks and Green Bay Packers on January 4, 2004. The game, which was contested at Lambeau Field in Green Bay, Wisconsin, United States, became notable after Seahawks' quarterback Matt Hasselbeck proclaimed, "We want the ball and we're going to score!" when the Seahawks won the coin toss before the start of the overtime period. Hasselbeck's comment was picked up on the referee's microphone and was broadcast to the stadium and the television audiences.

Hasselbeck subsequently threw an interception on their second drive of overtime that was returned for a game-winning touchdown by Packers cornerback Al Harris. The score was the first defensive touchdown to win an overtime playoff game in NFL history and was ranked as one of the best 100 plays in NFL history. The dramatic finish advanced the Packers to the Divisional Round of the playoffs, where they lost to the Philadelphia Eagles in the 4th and 26 game.

== Background ==
The Seattle Seahawks finished the 2003 NFL season with a record of 10–6, putting them in second place in the NFC West. The Seahawks won the last two games of the season to secure a playoff berth as a wild card team. The Green Bay Packers also finished the 2003 season with a record of 10–6, enough to win the NFC North. After starting the season 6–6, the Packers finished the regular season on a four-game winning streak, scoring more than 30 points in each victory. The Packers only won the division after the Minnesota Vikings gave up two late touchdowns to the Arizona Cardinals in the last game of the year. The Seahawks and Packers had met in the regular season, with the Packers securing a 35–13 victory in Week 5 at Lambeau Field. This would be the first postseason match-up within the teams' rivalry.

With their higher seeding, the Packers secured homefield advantage and the right to host the game at Lambeau Field. The Packers were favored to win the game by 7 points. Both the Seahawks' head coach and starting quarterback had close ties to the Packers: Mike Holmgren resigned as head coach of the Packers after the 1998 NFL season to become the head coach and general manager of the Seahawks, while Matt Hasselbeck served as the backup quarterback to Brett Favre in 1999 and 2000 before being traded to the Seahawks.

== Game summary ==
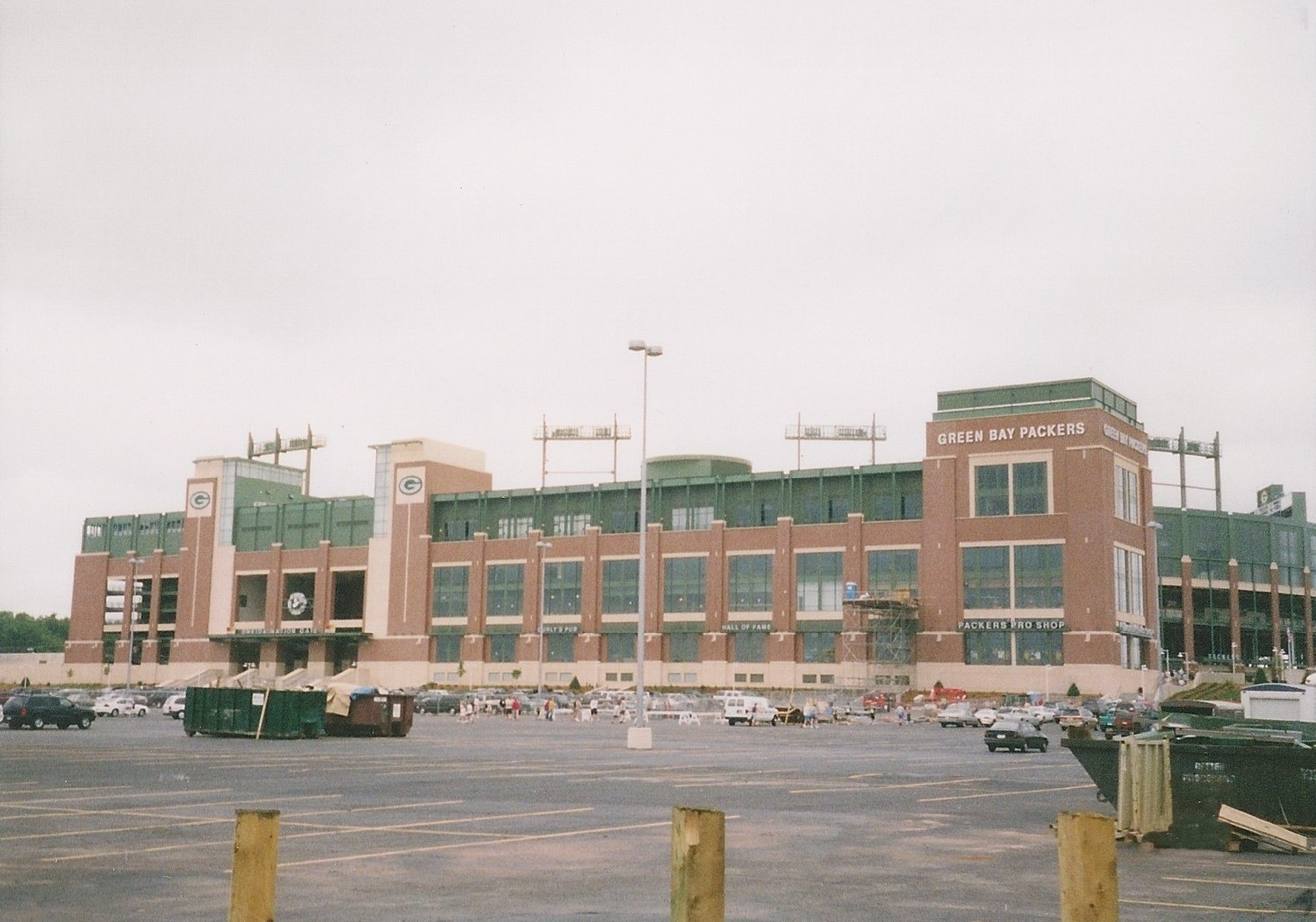
Lambeau Field, shown here in 2003, was the site of the game.

=== First half ===
The Packers started the game with the ball, but after a 10-yard catch by Bubba Franks for a first down, the team was stopped and forced to punt. The Seahawks scored first, driving down to the 12-yard line before a Josh Brown field goal put them up 3–0. During the end of the first quarter and beginning of the second, the teams exchanged two punts each on short drives. After receiving a Seahawks punt, the Packers broke through to tie the game on a 5-play, 37-yard drive culminating in a Ryan Longwell field goal. The Seahawks quickly regained the lead, driving 51 yards before the Packers forced a field goal attempt. Brown again converted, putting the Seahawks up 6–3. After the score, Brett Favre completed a 44-yard pass to Javon Walker on the first play of the drive. Favre completed another pass for 13 yards to Ahman Green and then a play later threw a 23-yard touchdown pass to Franks to put the Packers up 10–6. The Seahawks regained possession after the score, but their drive went backwards, as they lost a total of 18 yards on a sack, a fumble and a rush for negative yardage. After the Seahawks punted, the Packers gained 30 yards, with 23 of them coming from a pass to Donald Driver that ended in a Longwell field goal, increasing the Packers' lead to 13–6. The Seahawks again were unable to move the ball near the end of the half, punting back to the Packers who proceeded to kneel the ball to end the half.

=== Second half ===
The Seahawks began the second half with a 10-play, 74-yard drive. Matt Hasselbeck completed three separate passes each over 10 yards and Shaun Alexander scored on a fourth down rush from the 1-yard line. The extra point brought the score even, 13–13. The Packers started their next drive strong, gaining 20 yards on two plays to put the ball at mid-field, but after two incompletions they were forced to punt. The Seahawks again engineered a long scoring drive, punctuated by a 33-yard catch by Koren Robinson and Alexander's second rushing touchdown, again from the 1-yard line. The Packers got the ball back, down 20–13, but quickly evened the score again. The 12-play, 60-yard scoring drive covered the end of the third quarter and beginning of the fourth quarter. Favre completed all 5 pass attempts, while Green converted a fourth down attempt and then a rushing touchdown from the 1-yard line. With the game tied 20–20, the Seahawks went three-and-out, punting the ball back to the Packers. The Packers methodically moved the ball down the field with a mix of short passes and rushes, before Green rushed for his second touchdown, again from the 1-yard line. Now down 27–20, the Seahawks got the ball back with just over 2 minutes left in the game. Hasselbeck completed three separate passes for 9, 16 and 34 yards to get the Seahawks into scoring position. After a 5-yard penalty gave the Seahawks a first down on the 1-yard line, Alexander scored his third rushing touchdown of the game (all three from the 1-yard line). Brown's extra point evened the score 27–27 with 51 seconds left in the game. After two short completions, Favre found Walker for a 27-yard catch to put the Packers in field goal range. After a short rush by Green, the Packers called timeout and brought Longwell on for a potential game-winning field goal. Longwell missed the attempt though, sending the game into overtime.

=== Overtime ===
The Seahawks won the coin toss and chose to receive the ball. In selecting to receive the ball, Hasselbeck excitedly exclaimed, "We want the ball and we're going to score!" to the referee, which was picked up on the referee's microphone and heard by the crowd at Lambeau Field and over the television broadcast. The Seahawks went three-and-out on their first drive and punted the ball to the Packers, who then also went three-and-out. After the Packers' punt, the Seahawks gained a first down on two short passes. After a rush for a one yard loss and an incomplete pass, the Seahawks faced a 3rd down with 11 yards to go. Hasselbeck snapped the ball and almost immediately turned and threw the ball toward the left sideline. Al Harris jumped the route and stepped in front of the intended receiver, Alex Bannister, intercepting the ball at mid-field and returning it for a walk-off touchdown.

=== Box score ===
Wild Card: Seattle Seahawks vs. Green Bay Packers – Game summary

Quarter	1	2	3	4	OT	Total
Seahawks	3	3	14	7	0	27
Packers	0	13	0	14	6	33

at Lambeau Field, Green Bay, Wisconsin

- Game time: 1:00 p.m. EST/12:00 p.m. CST
- Game weather: 20 °F (−7 °C), cloudy, chance of snow
- Game attendance: 71,457
- TV announcers (Fox): Joe Buck (play-by-play), Troy Aikman, Cris Collinsworth (color commentators), and Chris Myers (sideline reporter)
- Sources: ESPN.com and Green Bay Press-Gazette

Game information

1st quarter

- SEA – Josh Brown 30-yard field, 7:01. Seahawks 3–0. Drive: 10s, 57 yards, 4:09.

2nd quarter

- GB – Ryan Longwell 31-yard field goal, 9:13. Tie 3–3. Drive: 5 plays, 37yards, 1:57.
- SEA – Brown 35-yard field goal, 6:50. Seahawks 6–3. Drive: 8 plays, 51 yards, 2:15.
- GB – Brett Favre 23-yard pass to Bubba Franks (Longwell extra point), 4:37. Packers 10–6. Drive: 5 plays, 80 yards, 2:01
- GB – Longwell 27-yard field goal,0:46. Packers 13–6. Drive: 6 plays, 30 yards, 1:22.

3rd quarter

- SEA – Shaun Alexander 1-yard run (Brown extra point), 9:28. Tie 13–13. Drive: 10 plays, 74 yards, 5:19.
- SEA – Alexander 1-yard run (Brown extra point), 1:57. Seahawks 20–13. Drive: 11 plays, 77 yards, 4:11.

4th quarter

- GB – Ahman Green 1-yard run (Longwell extra point), 10:01. Tie 20–20. Drive: 12 plays, 60 yards, 15:56.
- GB – Green 1-yard run (Longwell extra point), 2:44. Packers 27–20. Drive: 12 plays, 51 yards, 6:42.
- SEA – Alexander 1-yard run (Brown extra point), 0:51. Tie 27–27. Drive: 7 plays, 67 yards, 1:44.

Overtime

- GB – Al Harris 52-yard interception return, 10:35. Packers 33–27. Drive: 1 play, 52 yards, 0:00.

Seattle Seahawks stats

Passing

- Matt Hasselbeck – 25/45, 305 yards, 1 interception

Rushing

- Shaun Alexander – 20 rushes, 45 yards, 3 touchdowns
- Maurice Morris – 1 rush, 4 yards

Receiving

- Koren Robinson – 7 receptions, 88 yards
- Bobby Engram – 4 receptions, 83 yards
- Itula Mili – 6 receptions, 62 yards
- Darrell Jackson – 5 receptions, 58 yards
- Alex Bannister – 1 receptions, 8 yards
- Steve Hutchinson – 1 reception, 5 yards
- Shaun Alexander – 1 reception, 1 yard
Green Bay Packers stats

Passing

- Brett Favre – 26/38, 319 yards, 1 touchdown

Rushing

- Ahman Green – 23 rushes, 66 yards, 2 touchdowns
- Najeh Davenport – 7 rushes, 21 yards
- Brett Favre – 1 rush, -1 yard
- Javon Walker – 1 rush, -8 yards
- Aaron Rodgers – 2 rushes, 17 yards
- John Kuhn – 1 rush, 2 yards

Receiving

- Javon Walker – 5 receptions, 111 yards
- Donald Driver – 6 receptions, 66 yards
- Ahman Green – 5 receptions, 44 yards
- William Henderson – 3 receptions, 38 yards
- Bubba Franks – 2 receptions, 33 yards, 1 touchdown
- Tony Fisher – 2 receptions, 12 yards
- Robert Ferguson – 1 reception, 8 yards
- Wesley Walls – 1 reception, 5 yards
- David Martin – 1 reception, 2 yards

=== Analysis ===
Much of the post-game analysis focused on Hasselbeck's bold claim after the overtime coin toss and the play made by Harris to win the game. On the final play, the Packers blitzed Hasselbeck, who saw it coming before the snap and audibled to a different play. Harris noticed the audible, which he had seen earlier in the game, and took advantage, jumping the route and grabbing the interception. The game was noted for being a fairly even, back-and-forth affair. There was some officiating controversy regarding three separate fumbles, with two calls being overturned by instant replay. Mike Holmgren tried to challenge a possible fumble on a play where Green converted on fourth down and one yard to go, but was not allowed to by the officials. After the game, the Manitowoc Herald-Times noted that the victory was a team win, with key contributions coming from multiple players on offense and defense. Favre's touchdown pass made it his 14th straight playoff game with a passing touchdown, beating Dan Marino's record at the time.

== Outcome ==
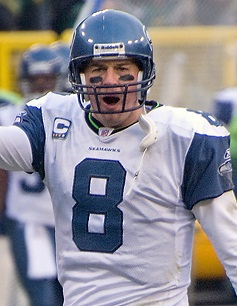
Matt Hasselbeck's (shown here in 2009) confident exclamation at the beginning of overtime and subsequent interception to end the game contributed to the enduring legacy of the game.

The Packers moved on to the Divisional Round of the playoffs to face the first seeded Philadelphia Eagles. This game also went into overtime after the Eagles converted on fourth down with 26 yards to go in the fourth quarter. The ensuing Eagles' field goal tied the game at the end of the fourth quarter, forcing overtime. The Eagles kicked another field goal to secure a 20–17 victory and move on to the NFC Championship Game.

=== Legacy ===
Harris was named the NFL Defensive Player of the Week for his interception returned for a touchdown, which was the first defensive touchdown to win an overtime playoff game in NFL history. In honor of its 100th anniversary in 2019, the NFL compiled a list of the 100 greatest games and the 100 greatest plays. This game was ranked as the 72nd greatest in NFL history, while Harris' interception return for a touchdown was ranked as the 86th greatest play. In 2020, the Harris' interception was ranked as one of the greatest moments in Wisconsin sports history by the Milwaukee Journal Sentinel; two years later the newspaper named the play one of the greatest in Packers' playoff history. The game and the play are a notable part of the Packers–Seahawks rivalry and are still discussed years later. Hasselbeck returned to Lambeau Field for a Monday Night Countdown in 2017 only to find a picture of Harris' interception in his hotel room. After returning to his hotel to find another photo of Harris, he realized it was a prank and autographed the photo. The game was also highlighted on NFL's Greatest Games.

== See also ==
- List of nicknamed NFL games and plays
