= Snow Globe Game =

2008 American football postseason game

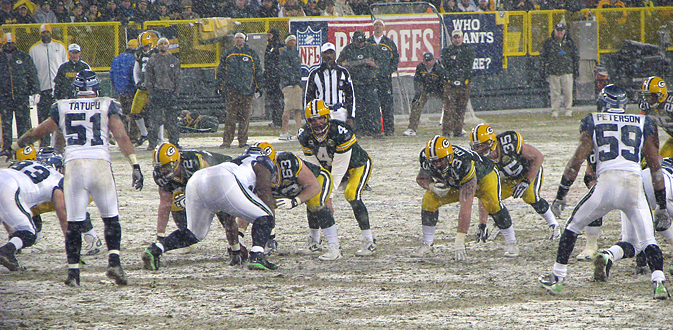
- Packers quarterback Brett Favre prepares for a snap during the game.
Seattle Seahawks (3) (10–6)	Green Bay Packers (2) (13–3)
20	42
Head coach: Mike Holmgren	Head coach: Mike McCarthy
	1	2	3	4	Total
SEA	14	3	3	0	20
GB	14	14	7	7	42
- Date: January 12, 2008
- Stadium: Lambeau Field; Green Bay, Wisconsin, U.S.
- Favorite: Packers by 8
- Referee: Mike Carey
- Attendance: 72,168

TV in the United States
- Network: Fox
- Announcers: Kenny Albert, Daryl Johnston, and Tony Siragusa

The Snow Globe Game was a National Football League (NFL) Divisional Playoff game between the Seattle Seahawks and Green Bay Packers on January 12, 2008. The game, which was contested at Lambeau Field in Green Bay, Wisconsin, United States, ended in a Packers victory, sending them to the 2007 NFC Championship Game. The Packers mounted their largest comeback in playoff franchise history, overcoming a 14–0 deficit in the first quarter after running back Ryan Grant fumbled in two straight possessions, leading to two Seahawks touchdowns. The Packers scored touchdowns on six straight drives, while also holding the Seahawks to just six more points the rest of the game.

Grant would go on to set a franchise record for rushing yards (201) in a playoff game, while also scoring three touchdowns. Brett Favre also threw three touchdown passes, while the Packers defense held the Seahawks to just 28 yards rushing as a team. During the game, a snowstorm caused poor visibility and difficult playing conditions for the players, leading to its nickname. The Packers would go on to lose to the eventual Super Bowl champion New York Giants in overtime in the NFC Championship Game, which ended up being the last game of Favre's career with the Packers.

== Background ==
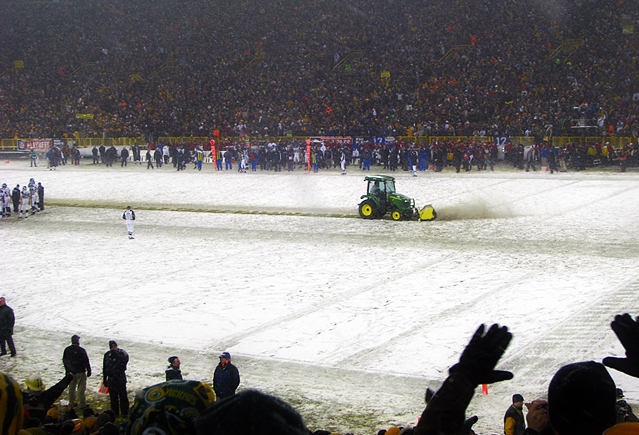
A tractor clearing snow from the field during the game.

The Seattle Seahawks began the 2007 season as the defending NFC West champions, three times running; they lost to the Chicago Bears in the Divisional Round of the 2006 playoffs. In the 2007 season, the Seahawks went 10–6, good enough for their fourth straight division crown and the third seed of the playoffs. After starting the season 4–4, the Seahawks won 5 straight games before losing 2 of their last 3. As the NFC West champion and the fifth seed in the playoffs, the Seahawks played host to the Washington Redskins (now called the Washington Commanders) in the Wild Card round, where they won 35–14.

The Green Bay Packers came off a disappointing 2006 season, missing the playoffs with an 8–8 record. It was head coach Mike McCarthy's first season after Mike Sherman had been fired. The Packers greatly improved their record in 2007, going 13–3, although two of their losses were to the Bears. The Packers secured the NFC North and the second seed in the playoffs (they lost a head-to-head tiebreaker for the first seed to the 13–3 Dallas Cowboys, who they lost to in Week 13). With the second seed, the Packers had a first round bye during the Wild Card round. With the Seahawks victory against the Redskins, the Packers would host the Seahawks at Lambeau Field for the Divisional Round game; the Packers were favored by eight points.

== Game summary ==
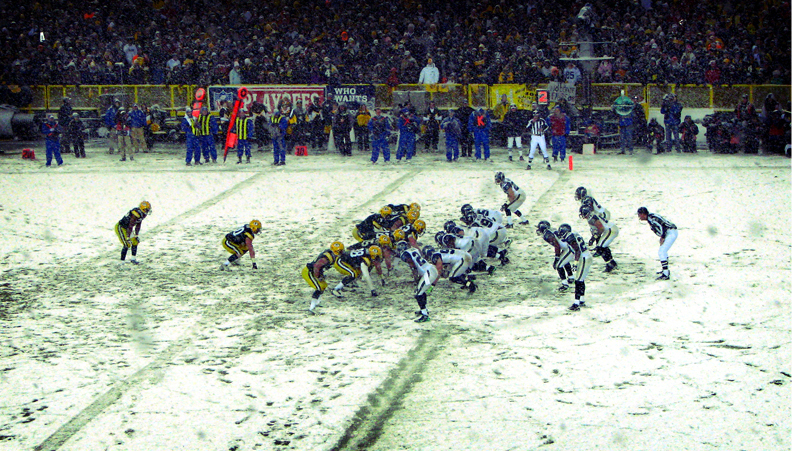
The Packers lining up to run a play close to the end zone during the game.

=== First half ===
The Packers began the game with possession of the ball. On the first play of the game, Ryan Grant fumbled the ball, which was recovered by the Seahawks and returned to the one-yard line. Shaun Alexander scored a touchdown on the next play, putting the Seahawks up 7–0. On the next drive, Grant fumbled a second time, which was recovered by the Seahawks at mid-field. The Seahawks drove down the field in six plays and scored a second touchdown, this time on an 11-yard pass from Matt Hasselbeck to Bobby Engram. In just a few minutes, the Seahawks took a 14–0 lead. The Packers regained possession and drove down the field, covering 69 yards in 6 plays capped by a 15-yard touchdown pass from Brett Favre to Greg Jennings. After a three-and-out, the Seahawks punted the ball back to the Packers, who tied the game 14–14 on a 9-play, 63-yard drive; Grant scored on a 1-yard touchdown run. On the ensuing Seahawks drive, Hasselbeck completed a short pass to Marcus Pollard, who fumbled the ball, which was recovered by the Packers. Three plays later, Favre completed a two-yard pass to Jennings for their second touchdown completion, putting the Packers up 21–14. After an 11-play drive that covered 47 yards, the Seahawks settled for a field goal to lower the deficit to 21–17. The Packers responded though with a long touchdown drive, going 70 yards ending with a 3-yard touchdown run by Grant, his second of the game. With under 30 seconds left in the half, the Seahawks ran one play and let time expire. The Packers took a 28–17 lead into halftime.

=== Second half ===
The Seahawks started the second half with a three-and-out, punting the ball to the Packers. Favre's third touchdown pass of the game, this time to Brandon Jackson, capped a six-play, 66-yard drive and put the Packers up 35–17. The Seahawks next drive was long, going 70 yards, but ended in a field goal after a third down stop by the Packers. The short field goal brought the score to 35–20. The Packers next possession ended with their sixth straight touchdown drive, with Grant scoring his third on a one-yard rush. With a 42–20 lead, each team had three more possessions, with the Packers all ending in punts and the Seahawks ending in two punts and a turnover-on-downs. The game ended with a final score of 42–20.

=== Box score ===
Seattle Seahawks vs. Green Bay Packers – Game summary

Quarter	1	2	3	4	Total
Seahawks	14	3	3	0	20
Packers	14	14	7	7	42

at Lambeau Field, Green Bay, Wisconsin

- Game time: 4:30 p.m. EST/3:30 p.m. CST
- Game weather: 31 °F (−1 °C), light snow
- Game attendance: 72,168
- Referee: Mike Carey
- TV announcers (Fox): Kenny Albert (play-by-play), Daryl Johnston (color commentator), and Tony Siragusa (sideline reporter)
- Sources: ESPN.com and Pro-Football-Reference.com

Game information

1st Quarter

- SEA – Shaun Alexander 1-yard run (Josh Brown kick), 14:40. Seahawks 7–0. Drive: 1 play, 1 yard, 0:03.
- SEA – Bobby Engram 11-yard pass from Matt Hasselbeck (Josh Brown kick), 10:59. Seahawks 14–0. Drive: 6 plays, 49 yards, 2:52.
- GB – Greg Jennings 15-yard pass from Brett Favre (Mason Crosby kick), 7:08. Seahawks 14–7. Drive: 6 plays, 68 yards, 3:51.
- GB – Ryan Grant 1-yard run (Mason Crosby kick), 1:02. Tied 14–14. Drive: 9 plays, 64 yards, 4:50.

2nd Quarter

- GB – Greg Jennings 2-yard pass from Brett Favre (Mason Crosby kick), 13:22. Packers 21–14. Drive: 3 plays, 18 yards, 1:32.
- SEA – Josh Brown 29-yard field goal, 7:18. Packers 21–17. Drive: 11 plays, 63 yards, 6:04.
- GB – Ryan Grant 3-yard run (Mason Crosby kick), 0:26. Packers 28–17. Drive: 14 plays, 70 yards, 6:52.

3rd Quarter

- GB – Brandon Jackson 13-yard pass from Brett Favre (Mason Crosby kick), 10:25. Packers 35–17. Drive: 6 plays, 66 yards, 3:29.
- SEA – Josh Brown 27-yard field goal, 2:46. Packers 35–20. Drive: 14 plays, 70 yards, 7:39.

4th Quarter

- GB – Ryan Grant 1-yard run (Mason Crosby kick), 13:26. Packers 42–20. Drive: 7 plays, 65 yards, 4:20.

Seattle Seahawks stats

Passing

- Matt Hasselbeck – 19/33, 194 yards, 1 touchdown

Rushing

- Shaun Alexander – 9 rushes, 20 yards, 1 touchdown
- Leonard Weaver – 4 rushes, 10 yards
- Maurice Morris – 3 rushes, -1 yards
- Matt Hasselbeck – 2 rushes, -1 yards

Receiving

- Bobby Engram – 6 receptions, 67 yards, 1 touchdown
- Ben Obomanu – 4 receptions, 63 yards
- Nate Burleson – 4 receptions, 33 yards
- D. J. Hackett – 2 receptions, 15 yards
- Shaun Alexander – 2 receptions, 13 yards
- Marcus Pollard – 1 reception, 3 yards
Green Bay Packers stats

Passing

- Brett Favre – 18/23, 173 yards, 3 touchdowns

Rushing

- Ryan Grant – 27 rushes, 201 yards, 3 touchdowns
- Brandon Jackson – 8 rushes, 34 yards

Receiving

- Greg Jennings – 6 receptions, 71 yards, 2 touchdowns
- James Jones – 3 receptions, 42 yards
- Donald Driver – 3 receptions, 18 yards
- Donald Lee – 2 receptions, 16 yards
- Brandon Jackson – 1 receptions, 13 yards
- Ryan Grant – 2 receptions, 6 yards
- Bubba Franks – 1 receptions, 7 yards

=== Analysis ===
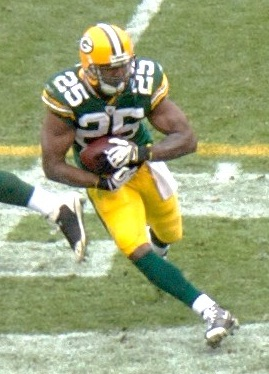
Ryan Grant (photographed during the subsequent 2008 season), was lauded for his performance and adversity overcoming two early fumbles.

Post-game analysis focused on the individual performances by Favre, Grant and Jennings, as well as the performance by the Packers defense. Specifically, Grant set a team playoff record with 201 yards rushing (the previous record was 156 yards by Ahman Green), while also scoring 3 touchdowns. This performance was even more impressive considering Grant's two early fumbles that put the Packers in an early 14–0 deficit (Grant had only fumbled the ball once during the regular season). Favre was efficient with his passing, completing 18 of 23 passes, including 3 touchdown passes, for a quarterback passer rating of 137.6. His passer rating was the highest of his career in the playoffs up to that point. Jennings hauled in two of the touchdowns and led the Packers with six total receptions and 71 yards receiving. The Packers set a team playoff record with six consecutive touchdown drives, all of which occurred after the Packers were down 14–0; the previous record was four straight in 1983. The six total touchdowns and the Packers 25 first downs were also playoff team records. After giving up the two early touchdowns, the Packers defense held the Seahawks to just six points the rest of the game. They held Alexander to just 20 yards rushing and the entire Seahawks offense to 28 yards rushing. The defense kept Hasselbeck in check, sacking him twice and forcing 14 incompletions. The Packers performance was highly regarded considering the weather during the game, with heavy snow limiting visibility and making playing conditions difficult.

== Outcome ==
With their victory, the Packers moved on to the 2007 NFC Championship Game, where they hosted the New York Giants at Lambeau Field; it was their first NFC Championship Game in 10 seasons. The game time temperature was −1 °F (−18 °C) with a wind chill of −23 °F (−31 °C). In a back-and-forth affair, the game went into overtime with a score of 20–20. Giants' kicker Lawrence Tynes missed two, fourth quarter field goal attempts that would have given his team the lead. In overtime, Favre threw an interception to Corey Webster, setting up a game-winning field goal by Tynes to send the Giants to Super Bowl XLII. The pass ended up being the last of Favre's career with the Packers after he retired, unretired and then was traded to the New York Jets.

The next season, both the Packers and Seahawks failed to reach the playoffs, with both teams having losing records. The 2008 season was the first for Aaron Rodgers as the Packers starting quarterback and they would go on to finish at 6–10, while the Seahawks went 4–12, which ended up being the last year under head coach and general manager Mike Holmgren.

=== Legacy ===
Due to the large amount of swirling snow, the game became known as the Snow Globe Game. It is well-known as an early match-up in the growing Packers–Seahawks rivalry. The victory ended up being the last of Favre's long career with the Packers and with the heavy snow produced iconic imagery reflecting Lambeau Field's nickname as "The Frozen Tundra". The 14-point comeback was the Packers' largest in the playoffs in franchise history. The game would become the second of four playoff match-ups between the two teams from the 2003 to the 2019 season. In 2014, Sports Illustrated called the game one of the top ten most memorable NFL games in the snow.

== See also ==
- Snow Bowl (1985), another Packers game played in heavy snow
- List of nicknamed NFL games and plays
