= Fail Mary =

Notable NFL game

Green Bay Packers (1–1)	Seattle Seahawks (1–1)
12	14
Head coach: Mike McCarthy	Head coach: Pete Carroll
	1	2	3	4	Total
GB	0	0	6	6	12
SEA	0	7	0	7	14
- Date: September 24, 2012
- Stadium: CenturyLink Field; Seattle, Washington, U.S.
- Favorite: Packers by 3
- Referee: Wayne Elliott
- Attendance: 68,218

TV in the United States
- Network: ESPN
- Announcers: Mike Tirico, Jon Gruden, and Lisa Salters

The Fail Mary, also known as the Inaccurate Reception, was a play in the National Football League (NFL) game played between the Green Bay Packers and Seattle Seahawks on September 24, 2012, at CenturyLink Field in Seattle, Washington. In a nationally televised game on ESPN's Monday Night Football, the Seahawks defeated the Packers, 14–12, in controversial fashion.

On the final play of the tightly contested game, Seattle rookie quarterback Russell Wilson threw a Hail Mary pass into the end zone intended for wide receiver Golden Tate. Both Tate and Packers defender M. D. Jennings got their hands on the ball while both players were still in the air and attempting to gain possession. The two officials near the play initially gave separate signals of touchdown and touchback, before ruling the players had simultaneous possession, resulting in a Seahawks game-winning touchdown. Prior to the catch, Tate shoved Packers cornerback Sam Shields with both hands, which the NFL later acknowledged should have drawn an offensive pass interference penalty that would have negated the touchdown and resulted in a Packers victory. The lack of a pass interference penalty and the ruling of a touchdown via simultaneous catch were widely questioned in the aftermath of the game, drawing comments from the game's announcers, NFL players, and the media. The NFL subsequently released a statement defending the touchdown ruling, while conceding that offensive pass interference did occur, which would have resulted in a Packers win.

The controversial ending followed weeks of criticism regarding the quality of officiating by replacement officials employed by the NFL during the 2012 NFL referee lockout. Two days after the game, the NFL and the NFL Referees Association (NFLRA) announced that they had reached an agreement to end the lockout. NFL commissioner Roger Goodell acknowledged that the negative attention the game drew to the referee situation was an impetus for ending the labor dispute.

== Background ==
The Green Bay Packers started the 2012 NFL season 1–1 after an opening loss to the San Francisco 49ers and a Week 2 victory against the Chicago Bears. The Seattle Seahawks also started the season 1–1 in similar fashion, losing in Week 1 to the Arizona Cardinals before beating the Dallas Cowboys in Week 2.

Prior to the beginning of the season, the NFL Referees Association and the NFL had a labor dispute. After negotiations failed for a new collective bargaining agreement, the NFL locked out the referees and began hiring replacement officials. These replacements were primarily fielded from lower college divisions or even high schools. Through the first few weeks of the season, officiating controversies occurred during various games leading many analysts and players to complain about the poor quality of the officiating.

== Game summary ==
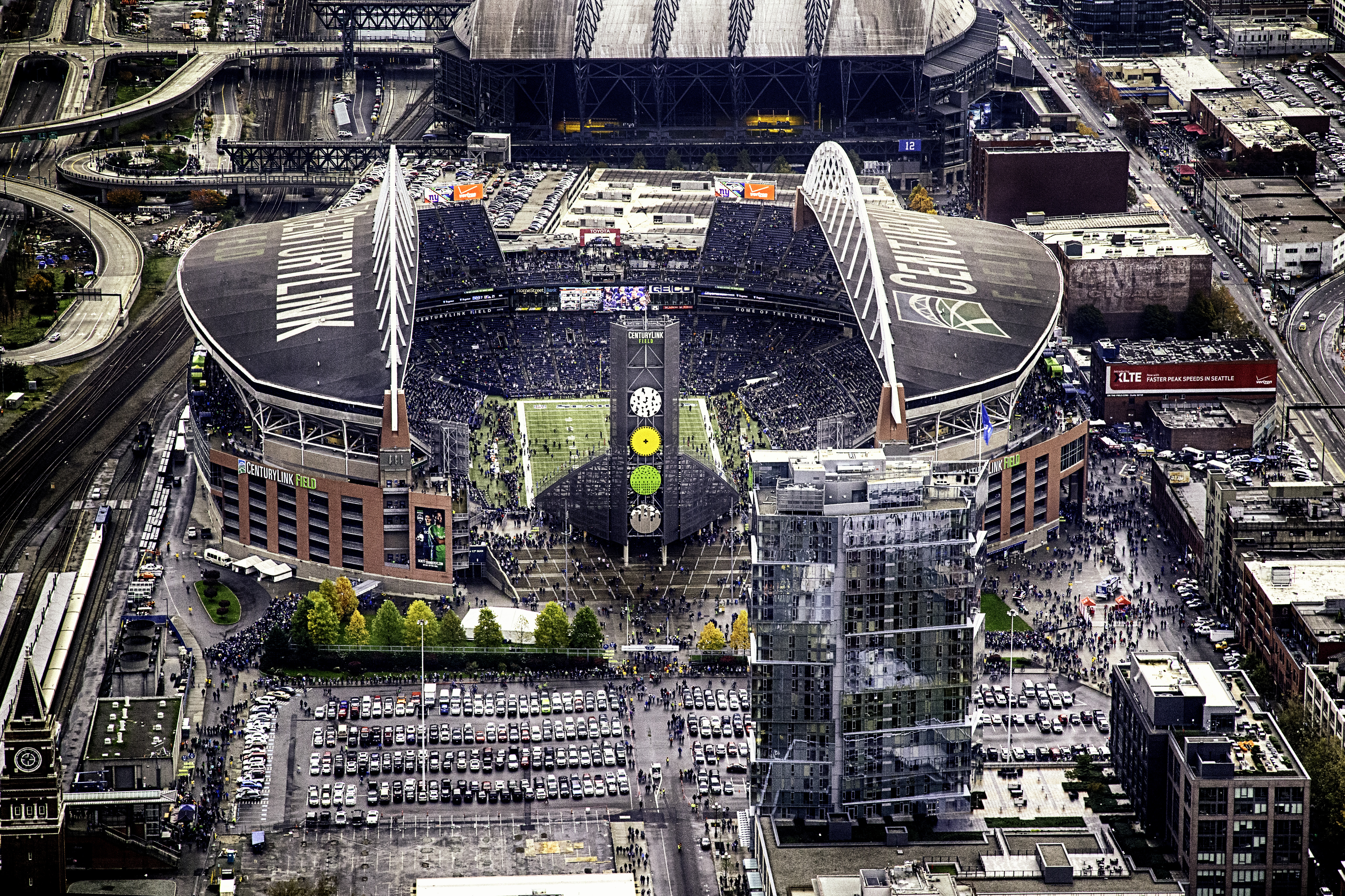
Lumen Field (known as CenturyLink Field at the time) was the site of the Fail Mary game.

=== First half ===
The Seahawks began the game with possession of the football. Throughout the first quarter and half of the second quarter, each team had four possessions, all ending in punts. Each team had two three-and-outs and none of the first eight drives went longer than 47 yards. Halfway through the second quarter, the Seahawks scored first on a five-play, 58-yard drive punctuated by a 41-yard touchdown pass from Russell Wilson to Golden Tate. The Packers punted on the ensuing drive and the Seahawks ran out the rest of the clock to take a 7–0 lead into halftime.

=== Second half ===
The Packers started the second half with the ball and drove down to the 10-yard line. However, the Seahawks stopped the Packers on third down, forcing a field goal attempt, which was successful. After a three-and-out by the Seahawks, the Packers drove down but were again stopped on third down, forcing another field goal attempt. The field goal was good, cutting the Seahawks lead to 7–6. After a second consecutive three-and-out, the Packers scored their first touchdown of the game, going 82 yards in 16 plays. The drive included four, third-down conversions, with Cedric Benson scoring on a one-yard run. The Packers attempted a two-point conversion, although it was unsuccessful, leaving the Packers lead at 12–7. On the ensuing drive, the Packers intercepted Wilson, although the play was nullified due to a roughing the passer penalty. The Seahawks drove down to the seven-yard line, but were stopped on fourth down for a turnover on downs. The Packers took over and on their first play, Benson fumbled, which was recovered by the Packers for a five yard loss. The Packers ran two more running plays, forcing the Seahawks to use all their timeouts and bringing the game clock down to 57 seconds. The Packers punted and the Seahawks began their drive at mid-field. Wilson threw five consecutive deep passes, connecting on one for 22 yards to get the Seahawks to the 24-yard line.

=== Final play ===
With eight seconds left in the fourth quarter, the Seahawks were facing a fourth down-and-10. Wilson snapped the ball and threw a Hail Mary pass into the Packers end zone. Several Packers and Seahawks leaped to catch the ball, with Packers safety M. D. Jennings and Seahawks wide receiver Golden Tate each having their hands on the ball. The two officials near the play conferred and then simultaneously made separate signals; side judge Lance Easley raised his arms to signal touchdown, while back judge Derrick Rhone-Dunn waved his arms to signal stoppage of the clock. Because Rhone-Dunn signaled timeout so as to stop the already expired game clock, Rhone-Dunn indicated that he desired further investigation of the play before rendering a verdict whereas Easley, from his angle, found sufficient evidence of a simultaneous catch with which to call a touchdown. The ruling on the field was officially a touchdown, with Tate and Jennings maintaining simultaneous possession. Replay official Howard Slavin initiated a video review, as is required of all scoring plays. According to an NFL press release after the game, "The aspects of the play that were reviewable included if the ball hit the ground and who had possession of the ball. In the end zone, a ruling of a simultaneous catch is reviewable." Referee Wayne Elliott determined that there was not adequate evidence to overturn the call, so the ruling stood as a touchdown.

As the teams and sports media swarmed the field, the Packers left the field and reported to their locker room, but were required by officials to return to the field for the then-mandatory conversion attempt per NFL rules despite it not changing the result (the rule was later phased out, though in this situation, under the revised rules, the try would still have to be attempted, as the Packers would have been able to return it for 2 and win the game 14–13).

=== Box score ===
Week 3: Green Bay Packers at Seattle Seahawks – Game summary

Quarter	1	2	3	4	Total
Packers	0	0	6	6	12
Seahawks	0	7	0	7	14

at CenturyLink Field, Seattle, Washington

- Game weather: 67 °F (19 °C)
- Game attendance: 68,218
- Referee: Wayne Elliott
- TV announcers (ESPN): Mike Tirico, Jon Gruden, and Lisa Salters
- Sources: Pro-Football-Reference.com and ESPN.com

Game information

1st quarter

- No scoring

2nd quarter

- SEA – Golden Tate 41-yard pass from Russell Wilson (Stephen Hauschka extra point), 6:22. Seahawks 7–0. Drive: 5 plays, 58 yards, 3:02.

3rd quarter

- GB – Mason Crosby 29-yard field goal, 8:07. Seahawks 7–3. Drive: 13 plays, 55 yards, 6:53.
- GB – Mason Crosby 40-yard field goal, 8:07. Seahawks 7–6. Drive: 11 plays, 69 yards, 4:36.

4th quarter

- GB – Cedric Benson 1-yard rush (two-point conversion failed), 8:44. Packers 12–7. Drive: 16 plays, 82 yards, 6:02.
- SEA – Golden Tate 24-yard pass from Russell Wilson (Stephen Hauschka extra point), 0:00. Seahawks 14–12. Drive: 6 plays, 46 yards, 0:46.

Green Bay Packers stats

Passing

- Aaron Rodgers – 26/39, 223 yards

Rushing

- Cedric Benson – 17 rushes, 45 yards, 1 touchdown
- Randall Cobb – 1 rush, 20 yards
- Aaron Rodgers – 2 rushes, 17 yards
- John Kuhn – 1 rush, 2 yards

Receiving

- Jermichael Finley – 4 receptions, 60 yards
- James Jones – 5 receptions, 55 yards
- Greg Jennings – 6 receptions, 35 yards
- John Kuhn – 3 receptions, 25 yards
- Jordy Nelson – 2 receptions, 19 yards
- Cedric Benson – 4 receptions, 19 yards
- D. J. Williams – 1 reception, 1 yards
- Randall Cobb – 1 reception, -1 yards
Seattle Seahawks stats

Passing

- Russell Wilson – 10/21, 130 yards, 2 touchdowns

Rushing

- Marshawn Lynch – 25 rushes, 98 yards
- Russell Wilson – 3 rushes, 18 yards
- Leon Washington – 1 rushes, 11 yards

Receiving

- Golden Tate – 3 receptions, 68 yards, 2 touchdowns
- Sidney Rice – 1 reception, 22 yards
- Zach Miller – 2 receptions, 12 yards
- Charly Martin – 1 reception, 10 yards
- Anthony McCoy – 1 receptions, 9 yards
- Ben Obomanu – 1 receptions, 8 yards
- Marshawn Lynch – 1 receptions, 1 yards

=== Analysis ===
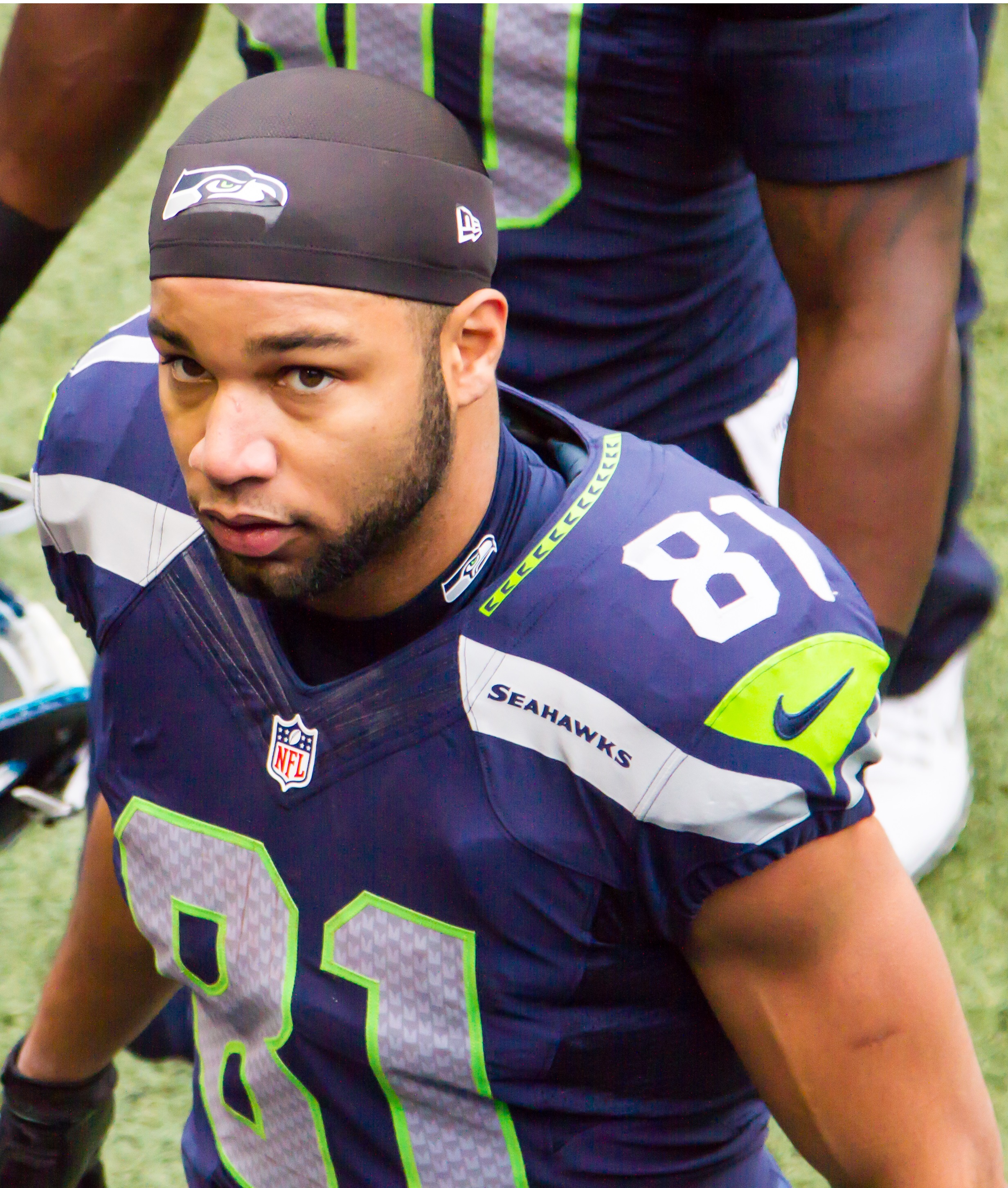
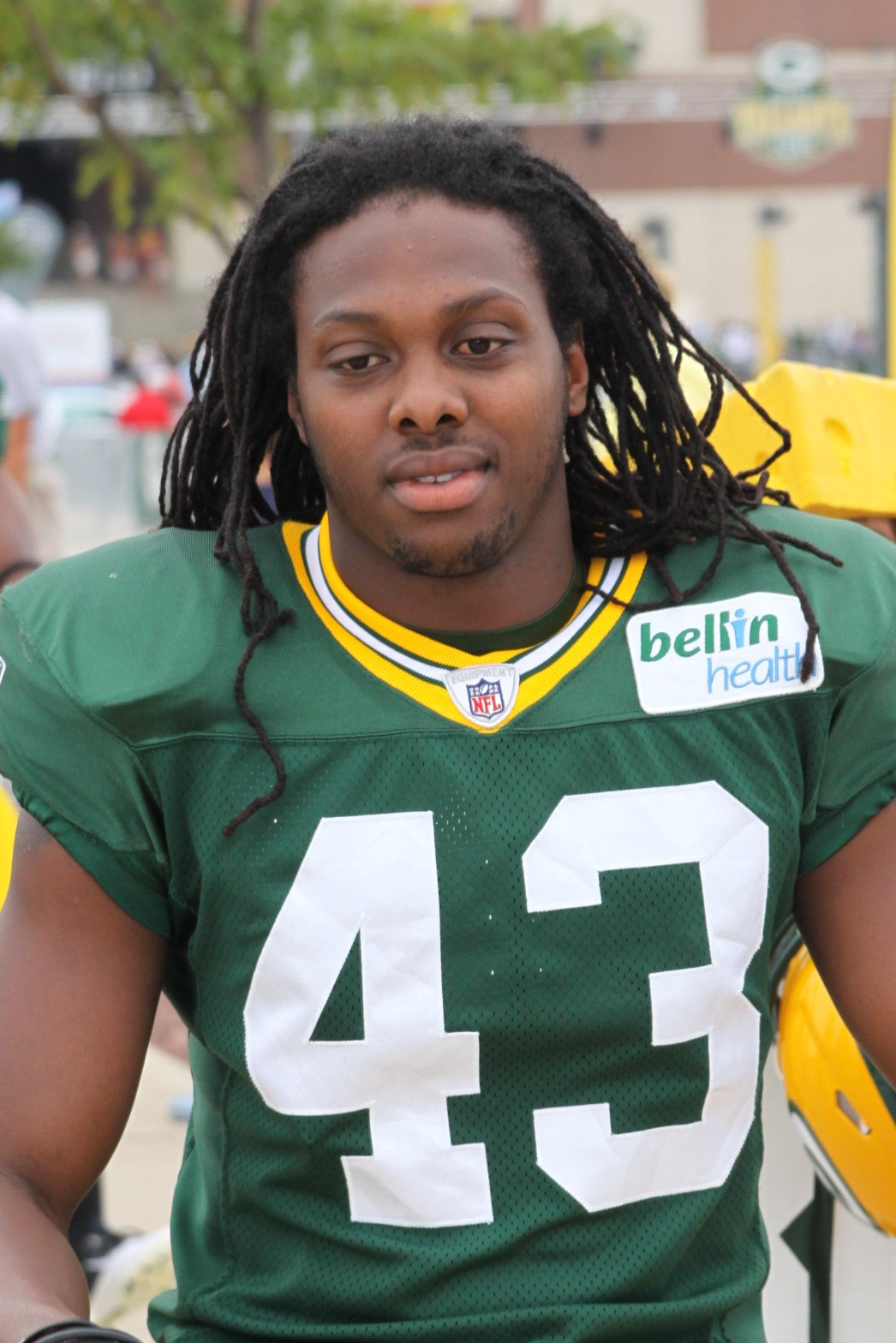
Post-game analysis focused on whether Golden Tate (left) or M. D. Jennings (right) had possession of the football on the final play.

The NFL rulebook states, "If a pass is caught simultaneously by two eligible opponents, and both players retain it, the ball belongs to the passers. It is not a simultaneous catch if a player gains control first and an opponent subsequently gains joint control. If the ball is muffed after simultaneous touching by two such players, all the players of the passing team become eligible to catch the loose ball."

Regarding the NFL's position of a simultaneous catch with both players on the ground, Mike Florio wrote for Pro Football Talk, "In reality, the outcome was determined before the players hit the ground. That’s when Jennings first gained 'control' of the ball, regardless of whether Tate eventually secured simultaneous 'possession' of it... The relevant portion of the official 2012 rules comes from Rule 8, Section 1, Article 3, Item 5: 'It is not a simultaneous catch if a player gains control first and an opponent subsequently gains joint control.' (Emphasis added.) Thus, it doesn’t matter whether the officials determined that Tate and Jennings jointly had 'possession' when they landed; the question is whether Jennings 'gained control' first." The New York Times columnist Greg Bishop disputed the touchdown, writing, "Another defender, M. D. Jennings, leapt from behind Tate. The ball appeared to land in Jennings’s hands. Tate’s hands were there, too, as Jennings fell to the ground and pulled the ball to his chest. Tate eventually wrestled the ball away." Bishop further noted that, in waving his arms, back judge Rhone-Dunn appeared to be signaling a touchback for a change of possession via interception, which would have ended the game with a Packers victory.

Contrary to Florio's analysis of the rules, Cold Hard Football Facts writer Scott Kacsmar supported the touchdown ruling, stating "Golden Tate had the first control of the ball, catching it with his left hand, which never loses control of the ball throughout the entire process of the play. His two feet hit the ground to establish possession before M.D. Jennings establishes possession. Tate’s butt hits the ground, and at this point, he still has control, possession and is in the end zone for a good touchdown. Tate pushed off for an uncalled offensive pass interference that would have ended the game, but this is irrelevant when history shows no referee in football will make such a call on a Hail Mary. Seattle’s win is legit."

Most sources, however, agree with Florio that Jennings gained control before Tate, with some posting photo and video evidence to back up their claim. Following the incident, Larry Brown of Larry Brown Sports summed it up: "Most fans, media members, commentators, and impartial viewers agreed that safety M.D. Jennings intercepted the pass. He possessed it and appeared to control the ball. It was only after Jennings had the ball that Tate seemed to wrestle it from him."

== Aftermath ==
=== Controversies ===
The lack of a pass interference penalty and the ruling of a touchdown via simultaneous possession became the source of an immediate controversy. During the SportsCenter broadcast, Jon Gruden expressed disbelief over the calls: "Golden Tate gets away with one of the most blatant offensive pass interference calls I've ever seen. M.D. Jennings intercepts the pass. And Tate's walking out of here as the player of the game. Unbelievable." ESPN's Kevin Seifert wrote, "In all, it was one of the most disorganized and embarrassing scenes you'll ever see on an NFL field. At least, so far." The winning catch was subsequently referred to in the media by nicknames such as Fail Mary, Inaccurate Reception, and Intertouchdownception, (respectively referencing the Hail Mary pass, Immaculate Reception, and a portmanteau of the words "interception" and "touchdown") and Russell Wilson was referred to as having thrown a "game winning interception".

Following the game, the NFL released an official statement that acknowledged that the pass interference should have been called on Tate, but supported the decision to uphold the play as simultaneous possession:

When the players hit the ground in the end zone, the officials determined that both Tate and Jennings had possession of the ball. Under the rule for simultaneous catch, the ball belongs to Tate, the offensive player. The result of the play was a touchdown.

Replay official Howard Slavin stopped the game for an instant replay review. The aspects of the play that were reviewable included if the ball hit the ground and who had possession of the ball.

Referee Wayne Elliott and the officials determined that no indisputable visual evidence existed to overturn the call on the field, and as a result, the on-field ruling of touchdown stood. The NFL Officiating Department reviewed the video today and supports the decision not to overturn the on-field ruling following the instant replay review.

In an interview with TMZ three days after the game, side judge Lance Easley defended his touchdown ruling, saying, "It was the correct call." When asked why it was not an interception, he said, "You have to not only have the ball but have either two feet or a body part on the ground, and that never happened." He later added, "Put any other official who knows the rules and they would make the same call." However, the day before Easley made that comment, locked out referee Walt Anderson, who has worked numerous NFL postseason games including two Super Bowls, said he would have ruled interception either on the field or under the hood. In addition, Bill Leavy, speaking on behalf of the locked out NFL officials including Ed Hochuli, said "they would have ruled Monday Night's would be an interception," and added "Like Ed, I've never seen one," referring to a simultaneous catch.

Many NFL players commented on the ending, including several Packers players. Packers offensive lineman T. J. Lang tweeted after the game, "Got fucked by the refs.. Embarrassing. Thanks nfl." He later added, "Fuck it NFL.. Fine me and use the money to pay the regular refs." The second of the two was retweeted over 98,000 times, a record on the Twitter platform at that time. Lang was ultimately not fined for the posts. Lang also claimed that the Packers were considering going on strike if the lockout was not resolved, though ultimately, no such action was taken. Packers quarterback Aaron Rodgers responded by saying, "First of all, I've got to do something that the NFL is not going to do: I have to apologize to the fans. Our sport is a multi-billion dollar machine, generated by people who pay good money to come watch us play. The product on the field is not being complemented by an appropriate set of officials. The games are getting out of control." Packers head coach Mike McCarthy later stated he had been informed that Jennings had intercepted the pass.

The day after the game, then-New Jersey State Senate President Stephen Sweeney, a Packers fan, announced plans to introduce legislation banning replacement officials from working professional sporting events in New Jersey; two NFL teams, the New York Giants and the New York Jets, play their home games at MetLife Stadium in East Rutherford. Then-Mayor of Green Bay Jim Schmitt sent a letter to NFL commissioner Roger Goodell, stating, "As an elected official and public steward, I'm concerned about the impact on the integrity of the game and the significant financial effect that it may have upon our community." U.S. President Barack Obama weighed in on the ending, calling it "terrible" and adding, "I've been saying for months, we've gotta get our refs back."

Former quarterback Warren Moon speculated that the game—which had 24 called penalties for 245 yards (7 more than Seattle's 238 total yards gained)—could be an impetus to resolving the labor dispute, saying, "This could be the game that gets a deal done. Something like this, on the league's biggest stage, on Monday night, it's just not good for the game. You could argue the officials had a hand in the outcome, that they cost Green Bay the game or would have cost the Seahawks."

=== Impact ===
On September 26, 2012, two days after the game, an agreement was reached between the NFL and NFL Referees Association to end the referee lockout that began in June 2012. The contentious nature of the replacement officials' decision at the end of the Packers-Seahawks game is widely considered to have been the tipping point that finally led to the agreement. Roger Goodell acknowledged that the game "may have pushed the parties further along" in negotiations.

Las Vegas oddsmakers estimated that over $300 million in bets changed hands due to the final play. Offshore betting website SportsBook.ag announced that it would be refunding wagers for customers outside of the United States who bet on the Packers. For American football wagers, this was a tiny percentage of their take. In the wake of the controversial ending, SportsCenter achieved its highest ratings ever, receiving a 5.0 overnight Nielsen rating. Reportedly, 70,000 voicemail messages were left at NFL offices by disgruntled fans. In 2014, ESPN's listing of the 45 most memorable moments in the history of Monday Night Football, as voted on by ESPN.com contributors, ranked the controversy as #1.

== See also ==
- Packers–Seahawks rivalry
- List of nicknamed NFL games and plays
