= Golden Tate =

American football player (born 1988)

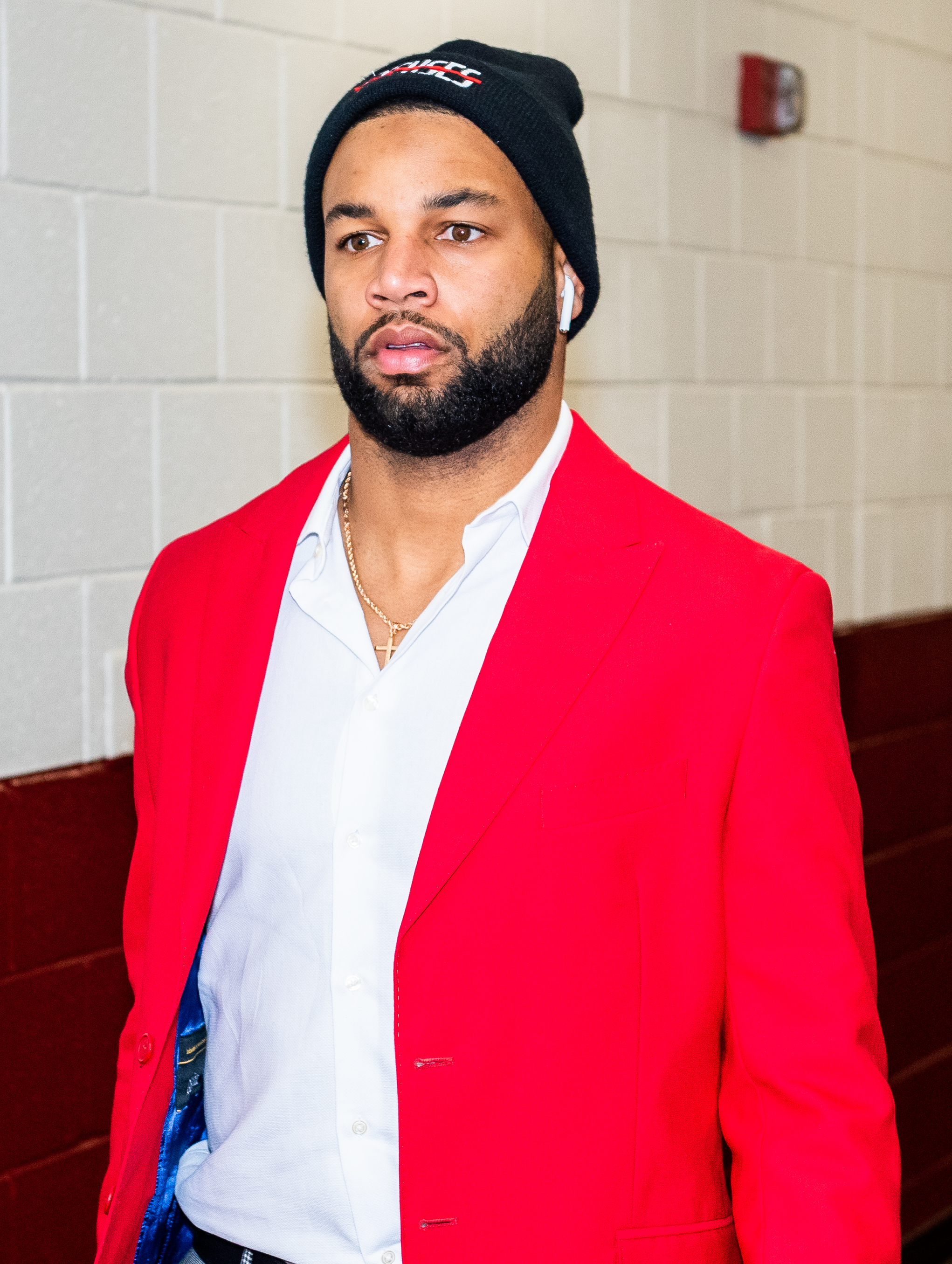
- Tate in 2019

No. 81, 15, 19
- Position: Wide receiver

Personal information
- Born: August 2, 1988 (age 38); Hendersonville, Tennessee, U.S.
- Listed height: 5 ft 11 in (1.80 m)
- Listed weight: 191 lb (87 kg)

Career information
- High school: Pope John Paul II (Hendersonville)
- College: Notre Dame (2007–2009)
- NFL draft: 2010: 2nd round, 60th overall pick

Career history
- Seattle Seahawks (2010–2013); Detroit Lions (2014–2018); Philadelphia Eagles (2018); New York Giants (2019–2020); Tennessee Titans (2021)*
- * Offseason or practice squad member only

Awards and highlights
- Super Bowl champion (XLVIII); Pro Bowl (2014); Biletnikoff Award (2009); Unanimous All-American (2009)

Career NFL statistics
- Receptions: 695
- Receiving yards: 8,278
- Receiving average: 11.9
- Receiving touchdowns: 46
- Stats at Pro Football Reference

Golden Tate

Port Angeles Lefties
- Outfielder
- Bats: Left Throws: Left

debut
- June 14, 2022, for the Port Angeles Lefties

Golden Herman Tate III (born August 2, 1988) is an American former professional football player who was a wide receiver in the National Football League (NFL). He played college football for the Notre Dame Fighting Irish, earning unanimous All-American honors and winning the Fred Biletnikoff Award in 2009. Tate was selected by the Seattle Seahawks in the second round of the 2010 NFL draft. He later played for the Detroit Lions, with whom he made a Pro Bowl appearance. He also played a season for the Philadelphia Eagles and two seasons for the New York Giants.

== Early life ==
Born in Hendersonville, Tennessee, Golden Tate attended Pope John Paul II High School, where he played as a three-sport athlete, competing in football, baseball, and track & field. In his high school senior year of 2006, he rushed 140 times for 1,413 yards and 23 touchdowns to go along with 28 receptions for 510 yards and six receiving touchdowns. He also had three interceptions on defense, returned a kickoff for a touchdown and was the team punter. He was named as a Tennessee Division II first-team all-state pick in 2006 as an athlete by the Tennessee Sports Writers Association and also by the Tennessee Football Coaches Association. His jersey was later retired by Pope John Paul II High School. One of Tate's friends from high school is racing driver Josef Newgarden.

After he injured his thumb in his senior season and could not play baseball, Tate switched to track and field and posted the state's top qualifying times in the 100-meter dash (10.93 s) and 200-meter dash (22.33 s). He was also a member of the John Paul 4 × 100 m relay squad that captured the state title with a time of 42.86 seconds.

== College football career ==
Tate played football for Notre Dame from 2007 to 2009. In the 2007 season as a freshman, Tate started two games, versus the UCLA Bruins and USC Trojans. He totaled six catches for 131 yards and one touchdown and averaged 21.7 yards on 15 kickoff returns for the season.

In the 2008 season as a sophomore, Tate started in 12 regular season games with 52 catches for 903 yards and seven touchdowns for a 17.4 yard per catch average. Tate registered 100-yard games against Michigan, Syracuse, North Carolina, and Pittsburgh during the 2008 regular season, while being tapped First-team All-Independent by Rivals.com. Against the Hawaii Warriors in the Hawaii Bowl, he made six catches for 177 yards and three touchdowns in the 49–21 victory for the Fighting Irish, bringing his season total to 58 catches for 1,080 yards (18.6 yard average) with 10 touchdowns. Tate was named the MVP of the Hawaii Bowl.

In 2009, Tate had nine games with at least 100 receiving yards. On September 19, against Michigan State, Tate had 7 receptions for 127 yards and an iconic game-winning touchdown in the closing minutes where he celebrated by jumping into the MSU marching band section in the corner of the endzone. On October 3, against Washington, he had nine receptions for 244 yards. On November 28, against Stanford in his final collegiate game, he had 10 receptions for 201 yards and three touchdowns. Following the 2009 season, Tate won the Biletnikoff Award. He was also recognized as a unanimous first-team All-American. Overall, he finished the season with 93 receptions for 1,496 receiving yards and 15 touchdowns.

On December 7, 2009, Tate announced that he would forgo his senior year and declared his eligibility for the 2010 NFL draft.

== Professional football career ==
Pre-draft measurables
Height	Weight	Arm length	Hand span	40-yard dash	10-yard split	20-yard shuttle	Three-cone drill	Vertical jump	Broad jump	Bench press	Wonderlic
5 ft 10 1/4 in (1.78 m)	199 lb (90 kg)	30 1/2 in (0.77 m)	9 1/4 in (0.23 m)	4.42 s	1.54 s	4.34 s	7.12 s	35 in (0.89 m)	10 ft 0 in (3.05 m)	17 reps	29
All values from NFL Combine

=== Seattle Seahawks ===
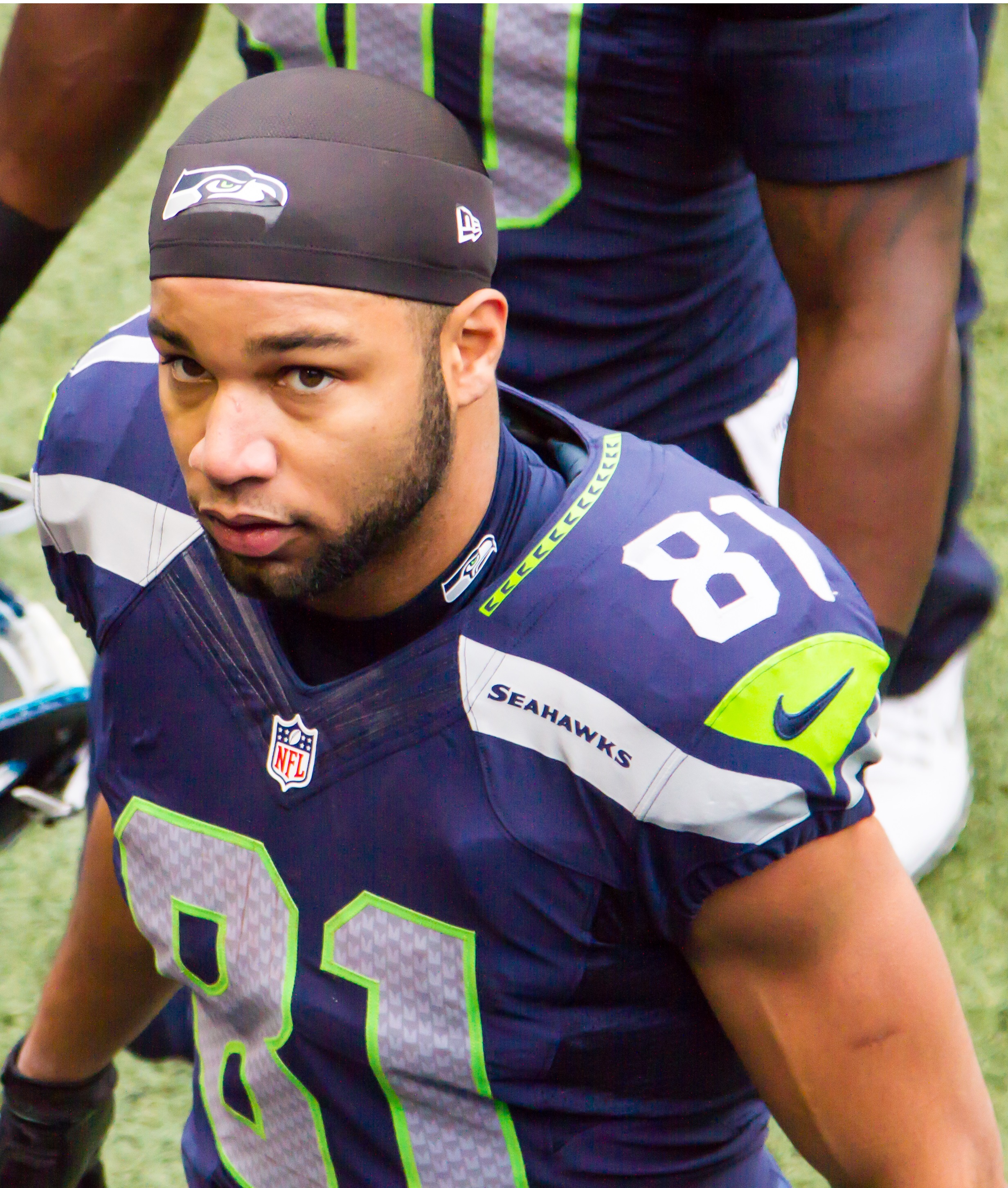
Tate in a game against the St. Louis Rams

On April 23, 2010, Tate was selected by the Seattle Seahawks in the second round (60th overall) of the 2010 NFL draft. On July 28, 2010, Tate signed a four-year deal with the Seahawks worth $3.261 million. He made his NFL debut on September 19 and had a 52-yard reception against the Denver Broncos. During his rookie season, he caught 21 passes for 227 receiving yards and returned 16 punts and a kickoff for 212 total combined return yards. The following year, he recorded 35 catches for 382 receiving yards and three touchdowns.

At the beginning of the 2012 NFL season, Tate gained notoriety for being involved in a controversial ending during a game against the Green Bay Packers on September 24, 2012, which became infamous due to the confused ruling by replacement referees. At the end of the game, Tate simultaneously caught a pass in the end zone with Packers safety M. D. Jennings; however, the officials made opposite rulings on the field. The official call was later ruled a touchdown, as according to NFL rules, simultaneous possession goes to the team on offense. The Seahawks won the game 14–12 in what is considered one of the most debated endings in NFL history.

Tate had a breakout year in 2013, improving significantly in all receiving statistics, with 72 receptions for 959 yards, and had an expanded role in returning punts. He was simultaneously an exciting player and a controversial one. During a week 8 game in St. Louis, Tate flashed his middle finger at Rams cornerback Janoris Jenkins following a failed interception on the pass, whilst he returned the ball for a touchdown. As a result, he was fined $7,785 by the NFL for excessive taunting. A week later, he was named NFC Special Teams Player of the Week after playing against the Tampa Bay Buccaneers in Week 9. As one of quarterback Russell Wilson's favorite targets, Tate went on to win a Super Bowl with the Seattle Seahawks in their 43–8 victory over Peyton Manning's Denver Broncos.

=== Detroit Lions ===
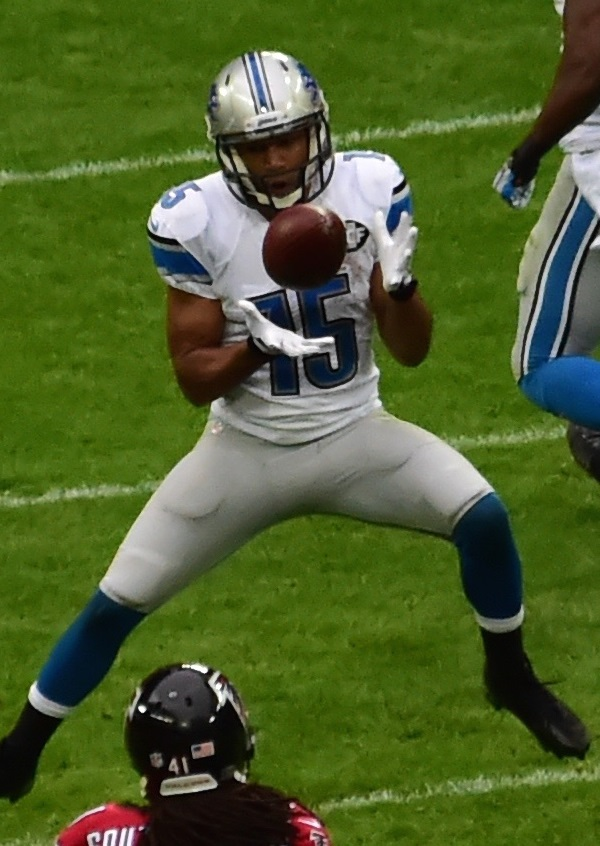
Tate with the Detroit Lions in 2014

Following the 2013 season, Tate signed a five-year, $31 million contract with the Detroit Lions, which included $13.25 million guaranteed. Alongside All-Pro receiver Calvin Johnson, he quickly became a key receiving target for quarterback Matthew Stafford. In his first season with the Lions, he had a then career-high 99 receptions, which was sixth highest in the NFL, and had 1,331 receiving yards, seventh highest in the NFL. He was selected to the 2015 Pro Bowl, which marked his first career Pro Bowl appearance, and was later ranked 85th by his fellow league players on the NFL Top 100 Players of 2015 list.

Although Tate did not make the Pro Bowl again with the Lions, his subsequent seasons with them were statistically successful.

In 2015 he recorded 90 receptions for 813 yards and six touchdowns.

His 2016 season saw him eclipse the 1,000-yard receiving mark for the second time in his career and the 90-catch mark for the third time in his career, and his 676 yards-after-catch statistic ranked highest among NFL wide receivers that season.

He finished the 2017 season with 92 receptions for 1,003 yards and five touchdowns, making back-to-back seasons where he had more than 1,000 receiving yards.

=== Philadelphia Eagles ===
Tate was a mid-season trade in 2018 from the Detroit Lions to the Philadelphia Eagles in exchange for a third-round selection in the 2019 NFL draft. Overall, he had 74 receptions for 795 yards and four touchdowns. In the Wild Card Round against the Chicago Bears on January 6, 2019, he made the game-winning touchdown catch on fourth down on a pass thrown by quarterback Nick Foles. The catch helped the Eagles advance to the Divisional Round against the New Orleans Saints, where Tate had two catches for 18 yards in a 20–14 loss.

=== New York Giants ===
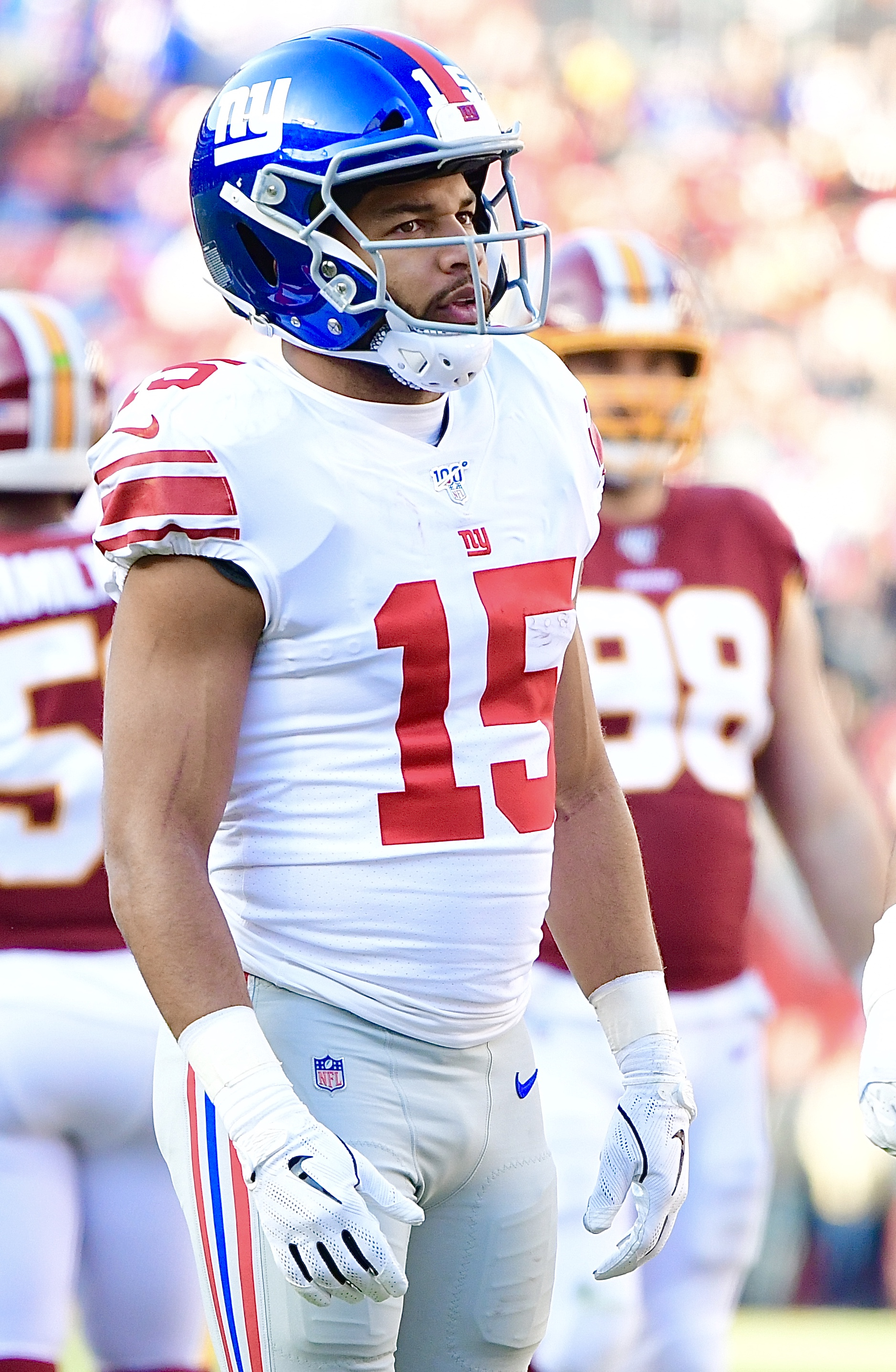
Tate in a game against the Washington Redskins

After the 2018 season ended, Tate signed a four-year, $37.5 million contract with the New York Giants that included $23 million guaranteed. He was later suspended for the first four games of the upcoming 2019 season for violating the NFL's policy on performance-enhancing substances. Tate subsequently appealed the suspension on the grounds that the substance was prescribed fertility medication. The appeal was denied by the NFL and Tate was eventually reinstated on September 30. He finished the 2019 season with 49 receptions for 676 receiving yards and six receiving touchdowns.

On October 4, 2020, following a 17–9 Week 4 loss against the Los Angeles Rams, a fight broke out between Tate and his sister's ex-boyfriend Jalen Ramsey due in part to Ramsey's comments against Tate's sister Breanna. Ramsey has two children with Tate's sister. Tate was not fined for his role in the postgame fight. In Week 8 against the Tampa Bay Buccaneers on Monday Night Football, Tate threw one pass for 18 yards and recorded two catches for 31 yards and a touchdown during the 25–23 loss. After Tate caught the aforementioned touchdown, he yelled "Throw me the ball!" at a camera. After the game, Tate's wife made posts on social media complaining about his lack of involvement in the Giants' offense. Tate also liked a tweet suggesting that the Giants should cut him. Tate was benched by the Giants for their Week 9 game against the Washington Football Team as a result of his actions. He finished the 2020 season with 35 receptions for 388 receiving yards and two receiving touchdowns.

On March 4, 2021, Tate was released by the Giants.

=== Tennessee Titans ===
Tate signed with the Tennessee Titans' practice squad on November 23, 2021. He was released by the Titans on January 4, 2022.

== Career statistics ==
Legend
	Won the Super Bowl
**Bold**	Career high

=== NFL ===
==== Regular season ====
Year	Team	Games		Receiving					Rushing					Punt returns					Kickoff returns					Fumbles	
Year	Team	GP	GS	Rec	Yds	Avg	Lng	TD	Att	Yds	Avg	Lng	TD	Ret	Yds	Avg	Lng	TD	Ret	Yds	Avg	Lng	TD	Fum	Lost
2010	SEA	11	0	21	227	10.8	52	0	2	4	2.0	3	0	16	202	**12.6**	63	0	1	10	10.0	10	0	1	0
2011	SEA	16	5	35	382	10.9	33	3	5	14	2.8	14	0	1	0	0.0	0	0	—	—	—	—	—	1	0
2012	SEA	15	15	45	688	**15.3**	51	**7**	3	20	6.7	13	0	—	—	—	—	—	—	—	—	—	—	1	1
2013	SEA	16	13	64	898	14.0	**80T**	5	3	31	10.3	20	0	**51**	**585**	11.5	**71**	0	**3**	**57**	19.0	24	0	**3**	0
2014	DET	16	16	**99**	**1,331**	13.4	73T	4	5	30	6.0	13	0	—	—	—	—	—	—	—	—	—	—	1	0
2015	DET	16	16	90	813	9.0	43	6	6	41	6.8	15	0	20	149	7.5	23	0	1	26	**26.0**	**26**	0	1	1
2016	DET	16	16	91	1,077	11.8	67	4	**10**	4	0.4	11	0	—	—	—	—	—	—	—	—	—	—	2	1
2017	DET	16	12	92	1,003	10.9	71T	5	5	22	4.4	10	0	2	23	11.5	13	0	2	0	0.0	1	0	1	1
2018	DET	7	4	44	517	11.8	67	3	3	**42**	14.0	**30**	0	2	15	7.5	9	0	—	—	—	—	—	1	0
2018	PHI	8	3	30	278	9.3	32	1	1	−8	−8.0	−8	0	5	13	2.6	12	0	—	—	—	—	—	2	0
2019	NYG	11	10	49	676	13.8	64T	6	1	16	**16.0**	16	0	10	97	9.7	17	0	—	—	—	—	—	1	1
2020	NYG	12	4	35	388	11.1	39	2	—	—	—	—	—	4	35	8.8	15	0	—	—	—	—	—	0	0
Career		160	114	695	8,278	11.9	80T	46	44	216	4.9	30	0	111	1,119	10.1	71	0	7	93	13.3	26	0	14	5

==== Postseason ====
Year	Team	Games		Receiving					Rushing					Punt returns					Kickoff returns					Fumbles	
Year	Team	GP	GS	Rec	Yds	Avg	Lng	TD	Att	Yds	Avg	Lng	TD	Ret	Yds	Avg	Lng	TD	Ret	Yds	Avg	Lng	TD	Fum	Lost
2010	SEA	2	1	1	5	5.0	5	0	**1**	**13**	**13.0**	**13**	0	1	11	**11.0**	**11**	0	—	—	—	—	—	0	0
2012	SEA	2	1	**10**	**138**	13.8	29	**1**	—	—	—	—	—	—	—	—	—	—	—	—	—	—	—	0	0
2013	SEA	3	2	8	61	7.6	13	0	—	—	—	—	—	**4**	**15**	3.8	10	0	**1**	**20**	**20.0**	**20**	**0**	0	0
2014	DET	1	1	6	89	**14.8**	**51**	**1**	—	—	—	—	—	1	2	2.0	2	0	—	—	—	—	—	0	0
2016	DET	1	1	3	25	8.3	13	0	**1**	0	0.0	0	0	—	—	—	—	—	—	—	—	—	—	0	0
2018	PHI	2	2	7	64	9.1	28	**1**	—	—	—	—	—	—	—	—	—	—	—	—	—	—	—	0	0
Career		11	8	35	382	10.9	51	3	2	13	6.5	13	0	6	28	4.7	11	0	1	20	20.0	20	0	0	0

=== College ===
Season	Team	GP	Receiving				Rushing				Scrimmage			
Season	Team	GP	Rec	Yds	Avg	TD	Att	Yds	Avg	TD	Tch	Yds	Avg	TD
2007	Notre Dame	12	6	131	**21.8**	1	1	4	4.0	0	7	135	**19.3**	1
2008	Notre Dame	13	58	1,080	18.6	10	5	37	**7.4**	1	63	1,117	17.7	11
2009	Notre Dame	12	**93**	**1,496**	16.1	**15**	**25**	**186**	**7.4**	**2**	**118**	**1,682**	14.3	**17**
Career		37	157	2,707	17.2	26	31	227	7.3	3	188	2,934	15.6	29

== Baseball career ==
Tate was drafted out of high school by the Arizona Diamondbacks in the 42nd round of the 2007 amateur draft. Tate did not sign with the Diamondbacks and instead played baseball for the University of Notre Dame. In 2008, Tate's freshman year at Notre Dame, he played in 18 games and batted .262 with three doubles and three stolen bases. Tate hit his first home run against Louisville in Louisville, Kentucky in his sophomore year. He finished his sophomore season with a .329 batting average after playing in 55 games. Tate also scored 45 runs his sophomore year which is the third highest by any Notre Dame baseball player.

On June 9, 2010, Tate was drafted by the San Francisco Giants in the 50th round (1,518th overall) of the 2010 MLB draft, but did not sign.

On June 14, 2022, Tate signed with the Port Angeles Lefties of the West Coast League as a center fielder. He started at center field that night.

== Personal life ==
He is the son of Golden Tate Jr., a former wide receiver at Tennessee State who was the 120th overall pick in the fifth round of the 1984 NFL draft by the Indianapolis Colts. His younger brother, Wesley Tate, was a running back for Vanderbilt University. His younger twin sisters Breanna and Deanna Tate were both sprinters while at The University of Mississippi. Tate has two nieces through his sister Breanna and NFL cornerback Jalen Ramsey.

In March 2017, Tate married Elise Pollard. They have three children.

In October 2015, Tate appeared as himself in episode 8 of the seventh season of the TV show The League.

In 2025, he appeared in the FOX show Special Forces: World’s Toughest Test.
