= Lockout =

Lockout or The Lockout may refer to:

- Lockout (industry), a type of work stoppage
  - Dublin Lockout, a major industrial dispute between approximately 20,000 workers and 300 employers 1913–1914
- Lockout (sports), lockout in sports leagues
  - MLB lockout, lockout in MLB
  - NBA lockout, lockout in NBA
  - NFL lockout, lockout in NFL
  - NHL lockout, lockout in NHL
- Lockout (film), a 2012 science fiction action film
- Lock Out (film), a 1973 Spanish film
- Lockout chip, a computer chip in a video game system to prevent use of unauthorized software
- Lock-out device, part of a signaling system used on game shows
- Region lock, a barrier to prevent media use outside of a specific region
- Lockout (news filing), a kind of "dateline" appended to a news report
- Lockout–tagout, a procedure to prevent unsafe activation of machinery
- Lockout, a period in some hostels during which guests are disallowed from the premises
- "The Lockout" (Broad City), a 2014 television episode
- "The Lockout" (The League), a 2011 television episode
- A form of vote-splitting in a two-round system
