= Lockout (sports) =

Shutdown of a sports league by team owners

In North American professional sports, a lockout is the shutdown of a professional sports league by team owners, usually due to a failure of a sports league to come to agree on a collective bargaining agreement with the league's player union. When a lockout occurs, owners close facilities and prevent any team activities, which can result in missed games, loss of paychecks, and unhappy fans. Notable lockouts include the 1972 Major League Baseball strike, the 1981 Major League Baseball strike, the 1982 NFL strike, 1987 NFL strike, the 1994–95 NHL lockout, the 1994–95 Major League Baseball strike, the 1998–99 NBA lockout, the 2004–05 NHL lockout, the 2011 NBA lockout, the 2012 NFL referee lockout, the 2012-13 NHL lockout, the 2021–22 Major League Baseball lockout, the 2023 LCS player strike, and the 2024 MLS referee lockout.

== See also ==
- Holdout (sports)
- MLB lockout
- NBA lockout
- NFL lockout
- NHL lockout
