= Tom Condon =

American football player and agent (born 1952)

No. 65, 63
- Position: Guard

Personal information
- Born: October 26, 1952 (age 74); Derby, Connecticut, U.S.
- Listed height: 6 ft 3 in (1.91 m)
- Listed weight: 255 lb (116 kg)

Career information
- High school: West Haven (CT) Notre Dame
- College: Boston College
- NFL draft: 1974: 10th round, 250th overall pick

Career history
- Kansas City Chiefs (1974–1984); New England Patriots (1985)

Career NFL statistics
- Games played: 148
- Games started: 131
- Fumbles recovered: 4
- Stats at Pro Football Reference

Thomas Joseph Condon (born October 26, 1952) is an American football agent and former right guard. He was named the most powerful agent in American football by Sporting News in 2006 and heads the Football Division of Creative Artists Agency (CAA) with fellow agent Ben Dogra. His clients include quarterbacks Sam Bradford, Drew Brees, Matthew Stafford, Matt Ryan, Alex Smith and brothers Peyton Manning and Eli Manning.

== College career ==
Condon went to Boston College in 1974 and was inducted into the Boston College Varsity Club Athletic Hall of Fame in 1984.

== NFL career ==
He was a guard for the Kansas City Chiefs between 1974 and 1984, and for the New England Patriots in 1985. After earning his Juris Doctor from the University of Baltimore during offseasons and representing teammates while still playing in the NFL, he went on to become president of the National Football League Players Association (NFLPA) from 1984 to 1986.

== Sports agency career ==
In 1989, he earned his NFLPA Certification. He joined IMG in 1991. In his agency career, he has represented A. J. Green, J. J. Watt, Calais Campbell, Luke Kuechly, Richard Sherman, Joe Burrow, and many other NFL players. Condon also represented the NFL Referees Association during the 2001 NFL referee lockout.
