= Head coach =

Senior coach or manager of a sports team

A head coach, senior coach, or manager is a professional responsible for training and developing athletes within a sports team. This role often has a higher public profile and salary than other coaching positions. In some sports, such as association football and professional baseball, this role is referred to as the "manager," while in others, like Australian rules football, it is called "senior coach."

The head coach typically reports to a sporting director or general manager. In professional sports, where senior players are full-time employees under contract, the head coach often functions similarly to a general manager. Other coaches within the organization usually report to the head coach and specialize in areas such as offense or defense, with further subdivisions into specific roles like position coaches.

In youth sports, the head coach often serves as the primary representative of the coaching staff, managing communication with parents and overseeing the overall development of young athletes.

== American football ==
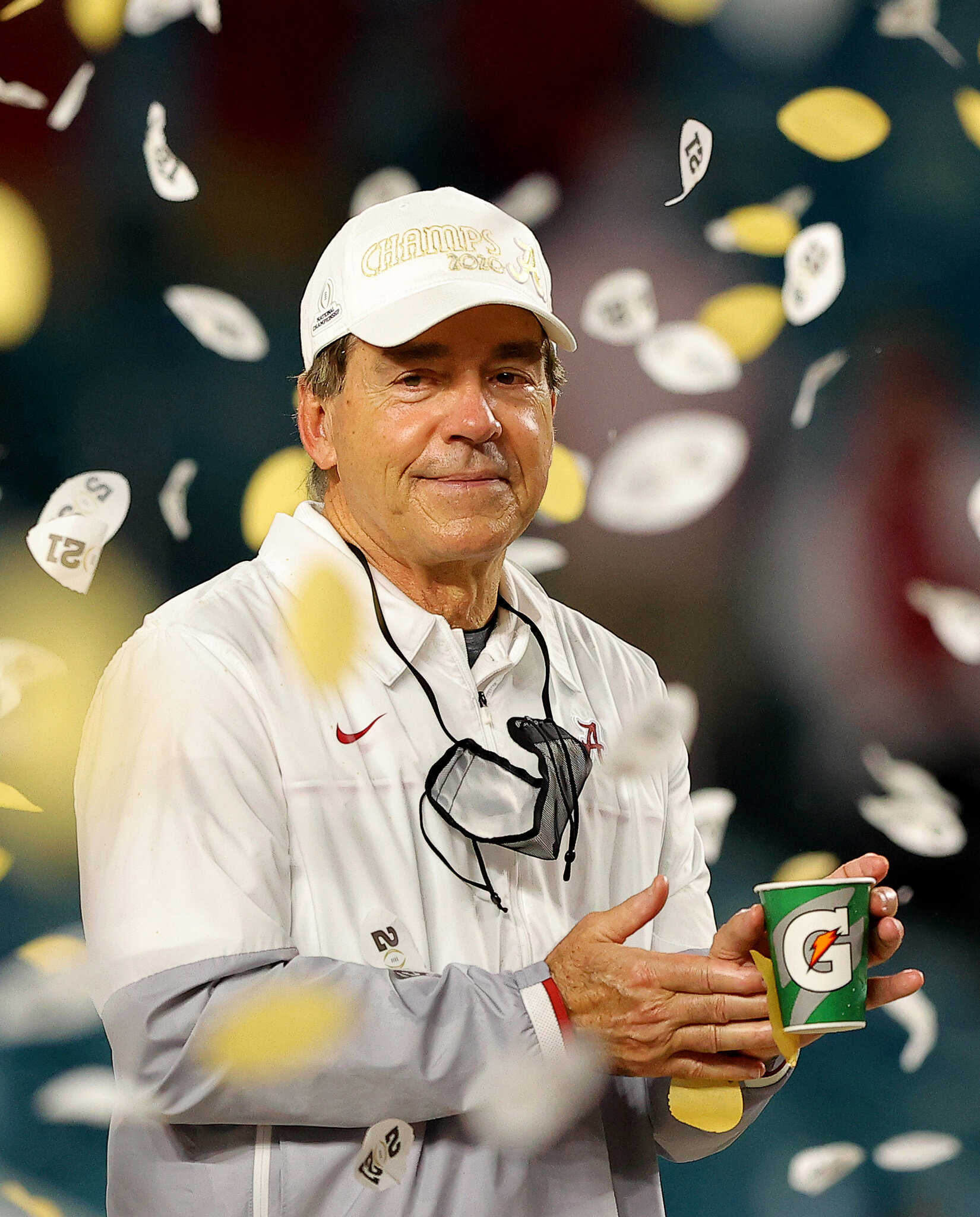
Nick Saban was the head coach of the Alabama Crimson Tide football team from 2007 to 2023.

Head coaching responsibilities in American football vary depending on the level of the sport.

=== High school football ===
As with most other head coaches, high school coaches are primarily tasked with organizing and training football players. This includes creating game plans, evaluating players, and leading the team during competition, deciding how the team is lined up, or their formation.

High school head coaches also have a variety of responsibilities beyond the football field. These include recruiting students within the school, scheduling opponents, and training/hiring/leading lower-level coaches. Coaches can also release or suspend players on their team for various reasons. Most coaches hold another position within their program's school, typically as a teacher. High school football coaches are typically required to have at least a bachelor's degree. Many coaches choose to earn a degree in physical education or sports management. Coaches will often preside over both a varsity and junior varsity team, but it is common for an assistant coach to handle the primary responsibilities of the junior varsity team.

=== College football ===
One of the major features of head coaching in college football is the high player turnover rate, which is how many players change teams, via the transfer portal, or getting drafted/graduating. It is currently averaging about 18% each season.

Head coaches at the college level have a paid staff and can concentrate on the overall aspect of the team rather than dealing with the nuances of training regimens and similar activities. Unlike head coaches at other levels, college coaching staff are solely responsible for the roster of players on the team. The ability to recruit top players plays a major role in success at the college level, and is done, in most cases, by the head coach or head recruiter. In addition to recruiting, the Head Coach is also in charge of Name, Image, and Likeness (NIL) funding which is a player's right to how their image is being used commercially. They play the main role of managing, facilitating, and fundraising for their programs funds. Head coaches act as the pitchman to boosters, alumni, and companies to secure funds for high school recruiting and player retention purposes.

A college coach acts as the face of a team, in a sport where the players regularly depart after a few years, compared to some coaches who have been in the same position for over a generation. They are often called upon to discuss off-the-field incidents such as rule infractions or player antics.

In a majority of states, the head coach of a public university's football or men's basketball program is the highest-paid state public official.

Major annual coaching honours given out at the end of the year include the Home Depot Coach of the Year, the Liberty Mutual Coach of the Year Award, the Associated Press College Football Coach of the Year Award, and the Paul "Bear" Bryant Award.

=== National Football League ===
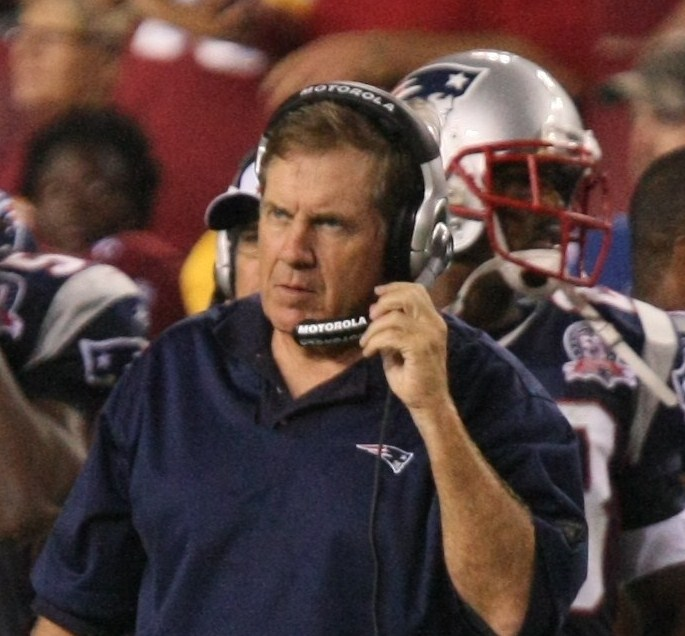
Bill Belichick was the head coach of the New England Patriots from 2000 to 2023.

At the professional level, head coaches often earn several million dollars a year, although there is considerable overlap between the salaries paid to top-earning college coaches and the range of salaries paid to head coaches in the National Football League. Since they do not have to travel the country recruiting high school players, head coaches at the professional level have much more time to devote to tactics and playbooks, which are coordinated with staff who are typically paid even more than at the college level. They typically report to the general manager.

A massive factor that affects NFL coaches salaries is the NFL's $11 billion earnings, making it the highest revenue sport, exceeding Major League Baseball's (MLB) $7 billion. The NFL's coaches are among the highest-paid professional coaches with professional football salaries topping a 2011 Forbes article on the highest-paid sports coaches.

Another major element of NFL coaches' contracts, negotiated between individual coaches and NFL teams/owners, are NFL-demanded provisions in the employment contracts of coaches that authorize the employing NFL teams to withhold part of a coach's salary when league operations are suspended, such as lockouts or television contract negotiations.

==== Salary ====
As of 2023, the average annual salary for a head coach in the National Football League is approximately $6.6 million annually. The salary for an NFL head coach can range from $5 million to over $18 million per year. As of 2024, the highest paid NFL head coach is Andy Reid, the head coach of the Kansas City Chiefs.

Andoni Iraola, head coach of Liverpool F.C.

== Association football ==
In association football, a head coach has the same responsibilities as in any other sport. For instance, in European countries, a head coach usually picks their coaching staff. The main difference is a head coach usually works with a director of football, with the latter responsible for player recruitment and negotiating contracts. In the United Kingdom, these roles are sometimes combined in the position of manager.

In some countries, an individual may be granted a position as a senior coach and act as the first assistant to the head coach or run a junior squad in the club. In the absence of a head coach, a senior coach can temporarily take over as an interim head coach (or caretaker manager).

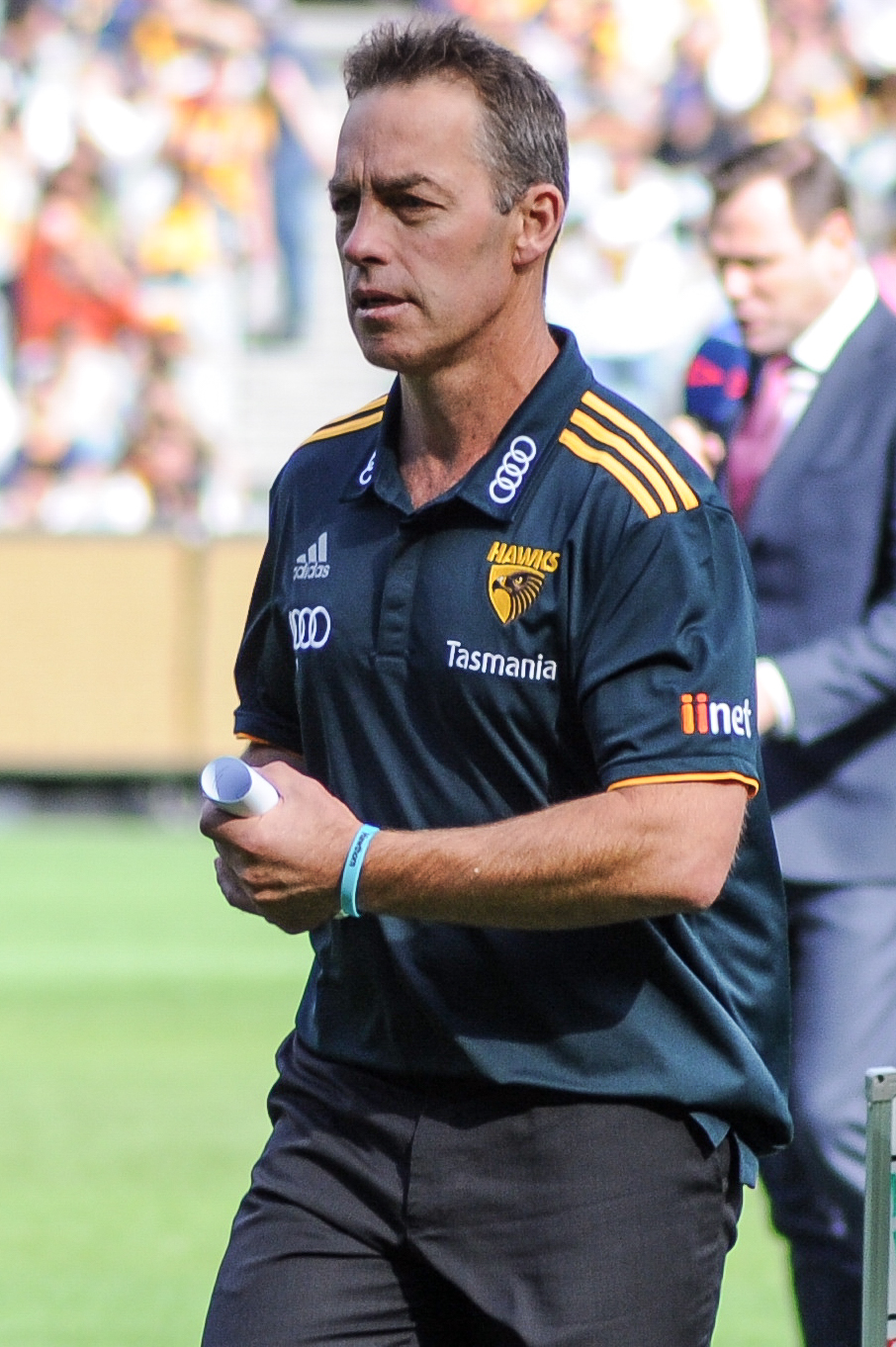
Alastair Clarkson, head coach of the Hawthorn Football Club.

== Australian rules football (AFL) ==
In Australian rules football, the head coach, or senior coach, is responsible for developing and implementing appropriate training programs for his players. The senior coach in the AFL is also responsible for determining the rotations and team lineups for each game. Moreover, the coaches are not the only ones involved in team operations, as in AFL teams, up to five different coaches may have their unique responsibilities. For example, there can be a forward, a midfielder, and a defense coach, each focusing on a particular position. Thus, each coach works with players in those positions.

== Rugby league ==
Mal Meninga, as head coach of the Australian national team in 2017

Rugby league football clubs typically have the head coach being the top of the coaching staff hierarchy, with a Director of Rugby (DoR) being a subordinate or administrative role, in a marked difference to that role at rugby union clubs. A professional rugby league head coach is the primary leader responsible for the tactics, selection, training, analysis and on-field performance of a 13-a-side rugby league team. They are tasked with media duties and in a broad sense in developing the players under their charge.

== Rugby union ==
Rugby union football clubs have the option of employing a director of rugby (DOR), a head coach, or both. The responsibilities for each role vary between clubs. Generally, if a club decides to employ either a DOR or a head coach, it will hold more responsibility than if it employs individuals for both roles. It has been proposed that the DOR is a club-wide position, providing and ensuring the club is working towards a shared philosophy from youth teams to senior teams.[14][15] A head coach, on the other hand, is focused purely on planning and implementing coaching for the first team alongside a coaching staff consisting of a mixture of defense, attack, forwards, backs, skills, and strength and conditioning coaches.

== Basketball ==
=== College basketball ===
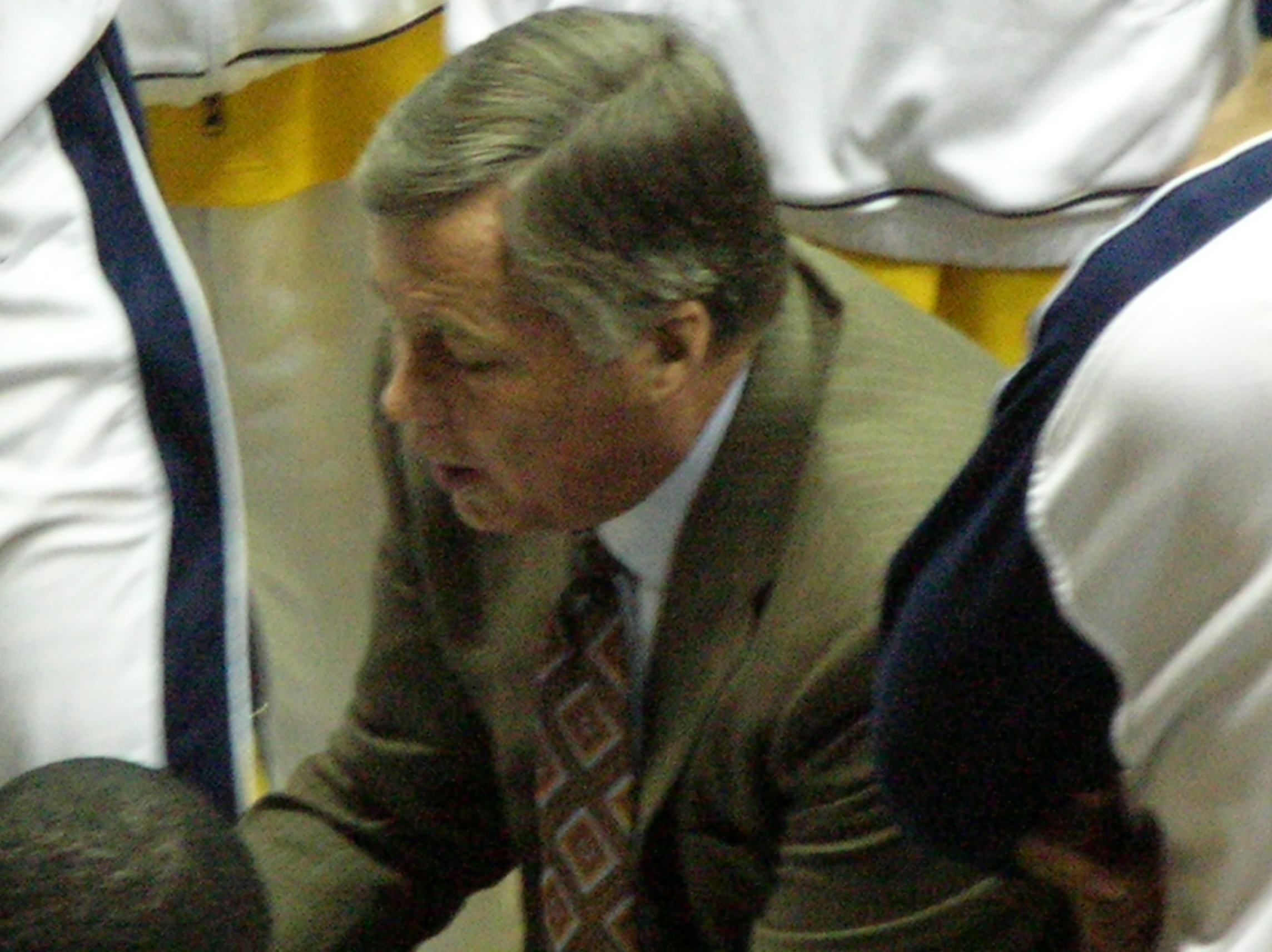
California Golden Bears men's basketball head coach Mike Montgomery in huddle at 2008 Golden Bear Classic championship game.

Part of the responsibility of a head coach is that they often become heavily involved in recruiting and scouting high school players. Successful head coaches are usually capable of identifying potential raw talent and attracting recruits to their program by cultivating a consistent culture and identity for their team despite the yearly loss of players who leave to play for professional leagues or other schools via the NCAA transfer portal.

A significant challenge faced by college basketball coaches is the fact that players can opt to register for the NBA draft after only one year of college, at the age of 19, as opposed to the three years enforced for college football players who wish to declare for the NFL draft.

Head coaching a college basketball program can often be a pathway to coaching positions in the NBA, although not always a direct one to head coaching. Some successful college coaches have become notable head coaches in the NBA after first taking assistant coaching positions, such as Quin Snyder, who was the head coach of the Missouri Tigers men's basketball team before eventually working his way to a head coaching position and winning record with the NBA's Utah Jazz.

=== National Basketball Association ===
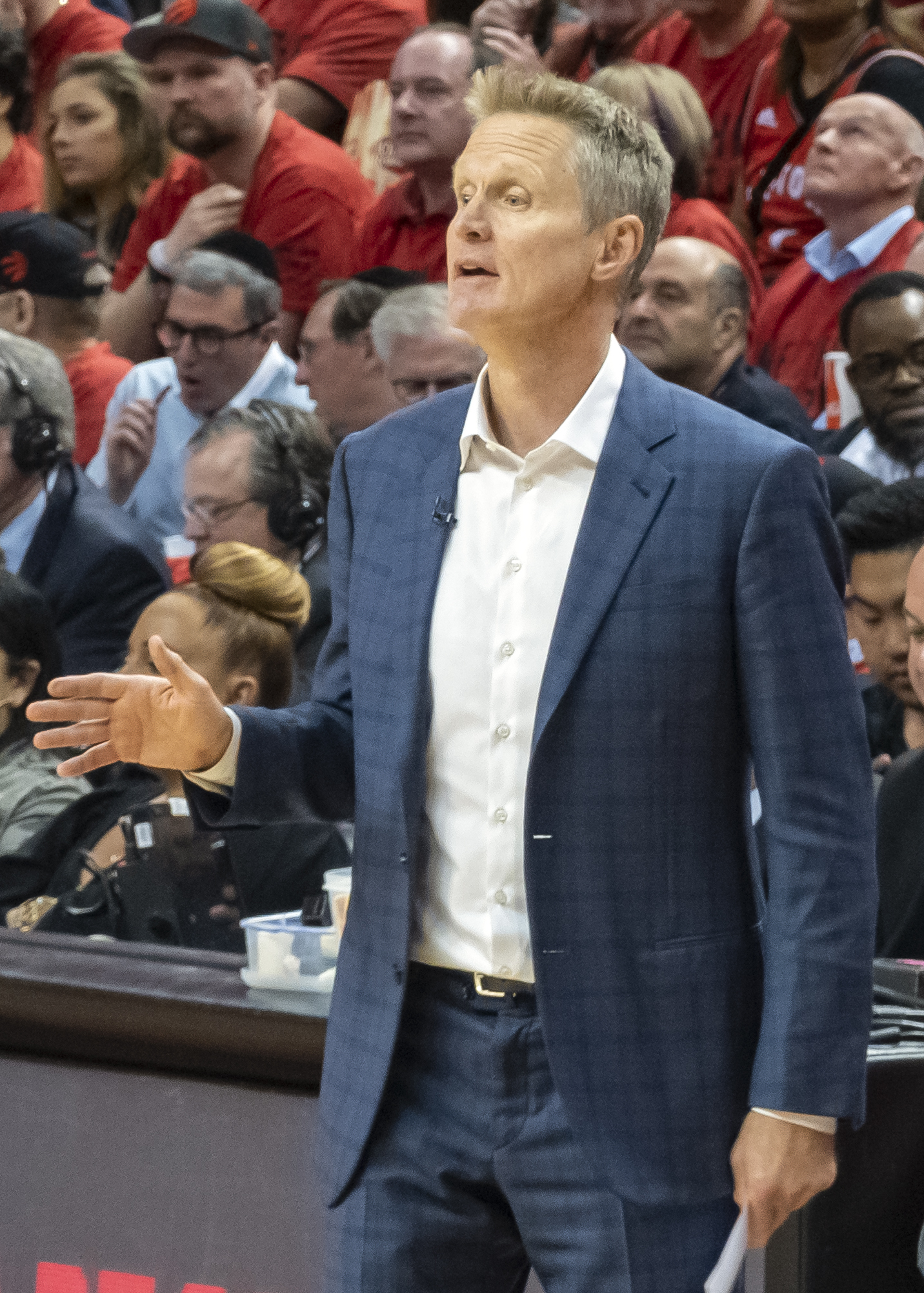
Steve Kerr, head coach of the Golden State Warriors and the highest paid coach in the NBA in 2025.

In the National Basketball Association (NBA), the head coach is responsible for developing game plans, scouting opponents, and managing players.

An important aspect of a head coach's job is deciding which players to play at which positions and how many minutes to play them there. Well-planned distributions of minutes among players and properly timed substitutions are crucial in the pursuit of achieving favorable defensive and offensive match-ups against the opposing team. The head coach's rotation is also important in ensuring players do not get exhausted from playing too many minutes, which can lead to injuries, and also for making sure that players who need playing time to develop get time on the court.

Some head coaches are known for being influential to team culture and chemistry and take on a notable leadership position in that regard. For example, championship-winning Los Angeles Lakers and Chicago Bulls head coach Phil Jackson was noted for his unique "zen" philosophies in the locker room, as well as his use of the triangle offense on the court, an offensive system centered around teamwork and passing.

Head coaches in the NBA often provide input and advice to the general manager of the team but ultimately are not tasked with making final decisions on the finance and business side of team operations. This includes drafting new players, making trades, and negotiating contracts. Some head coaches are able to successfully transition to being a general manager, including championship-winning executives. Red Auerbach served as head coach of the Boston Celtics from 1950-1966, winning 9 NBA championships as Celtics head coach. However, Auerbach continued as the Celtics' chief executive from 1966 until his death in 2006. He won 7 more NBA titles with the Celtics in the process. Other such examples of coaches successfully transitioning into general managers include Pat Riley of the Miami Heat, and both Danny Ainge and Brad Stevens of the Boston Celtics.

==== Player-coaches ====
The NBA once permitted active players to serve as the head coach of their team, but this practice was banned beginning in the 1983-1984 NBA season under the newly introduced salary cap regulations. The most recent player-coach was Dave Cowens, who both coached and played for the Boston Celtics in the 1978–79 NBA season.

==== Salary ====
As of 2025, the estimated median salary for NBA coaches is around $7 million annually. The highest paid coach in 2025 is Steve Kerr of the Golden State Warriors, who earns $17.5 million per year as part of a $35 million two-year contract extension.

== Baseball ==
=== Youth baseball ===
In Little League, or other youth levels of baseball, the manager is responsible for teaching players technique and rules, organizing practices, choosing the lineup and starting pitcher. Oftentimes, the manager is a parent of a child on the team.

=== High School baseball ===
At the High School level, there is a varsity and junior varsity level. The manager of the varsity team is the head of the school's baseball program, yet he does not manage the junior varsity team, as that is left to another coach in the program.

=== College baseball ===
At the college level, the manager is responsible for recruiting high school players to their university, setting the lineup and starting pitcher, making day-to-day decisions, and other choices. They do not teach and train players, that is left for younger levels and assistants, but they are the head of the program.

=== Minor League Baseball ===
In Minor League Baseball (MiLB), the manager is responsible for setting the lineup, pitcher, and making substitutions. It is similar to the Major Leagues. They prepare players for the major leagues and higher levels.

=== Major League Baseball ===
In Major League Baseball (MLB), the head coach, called the manager, is responsible for setting the lineup, choosing the starting pitcher, making substitutions, and supporting his players (often by arguing with the umpire). The manager will often make these decisions based on matchup, or platoon, advantages. Managers are often responsible for training players at lower levels, but specified assistant coaches are given that job at the highest level.

== Cricket ==
=== Role ===
To manage players treatment, rehab, recovery, and fitness sessions, depending upon the needs during national cricket team's engagement.

Nation	Name	Ref
Australia	Andrew McDonald	
India	Gautam Gambhir	
Pakistan	Aqib Javed	

== Sport of athletics ==
=== American track and field ===
Head coaching responsibilities for American or USA Track & Field vary depending on the level of the sport.

==== College track and field ====
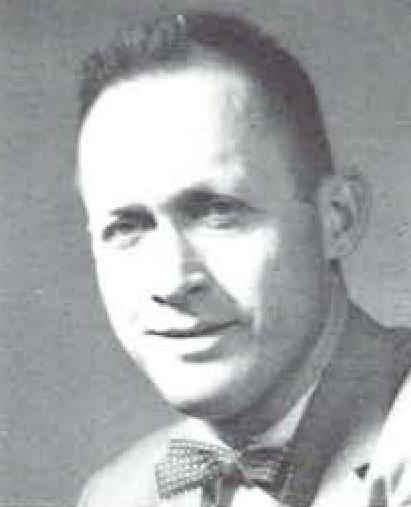
Bill Bowerman was an American track and field coach for the University of Oregon and co-founder of Nike, Inc.

=== American distance running ===
Head coaching responsibilities for long-distance running vary depending on the level of the sport.

==== College cross country ====
At the college or University level, cross-country running head coaching responsibilities vary widely depending on the program's budget and staffing.

== See also ==
- Coach (sport)
- Coach (basketball)
- Manager (baseball)
- Manager (association football)
- Coach (ice hockey)
- Coaching tree
- Athletics director
- Strength and conditioning coach
- U.S. Track & Field and Cross Country Coaches Association
