= Locked Out =

Locked Out may refer to:

- Locked Out (film), a 2006 French film directed by and starring Albert Dupontel
- "Locked Out" (Crowded House song), a 1993 song
- "Locked Out" (S-X song), a 2022 song
- "Locked Out" (Beavis and Butt-Head), a 2022 television episode
- Locked out, a status when using an airlock

== See also ==
- Lockout (disambiguation)
