= Bill Carollo =

American football official (born 1951)

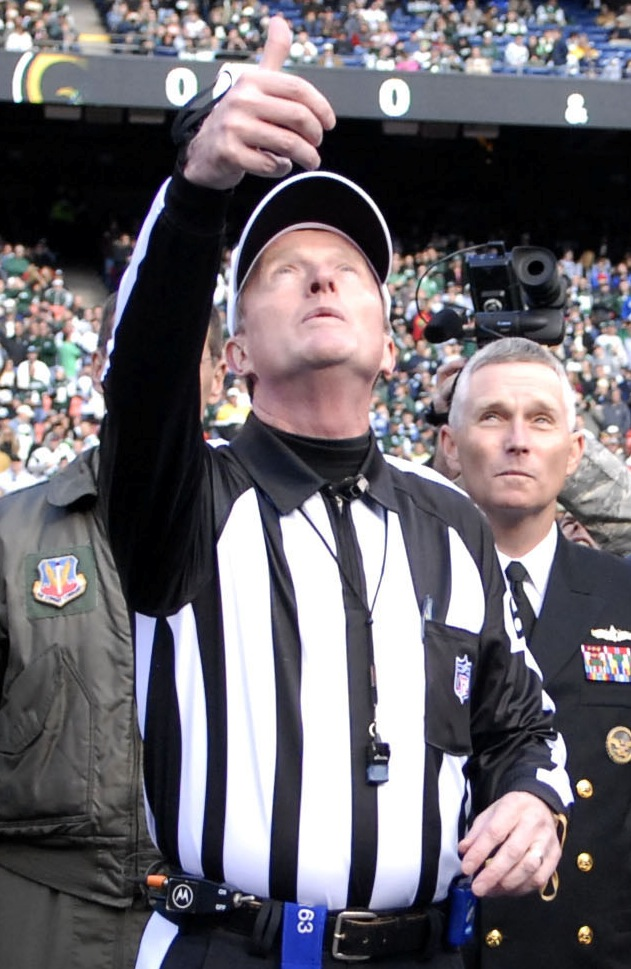
- Born: November 27, 1951 (age 73); Brookfield, Wisconsin, U.S.
- Education: University of Wisconsin–Milwaukee (Bachelor's degree, 1974)
- Occupation(s): Coordinator of Football Officials, Big Ten Conference (2009-present); NFL official (1989–2008); Vice President of Global Sales, Manpower, Inc.
- Spouse: Married
- Children: 4

William F. Carollo (born November 27, 1951) is a former American football official who officiated National Football League (NFL) games from 1989 through 2008. He wore uniform number 63. Carollo officiated in two Super Bowls and eight conference championship games. After the 2008 season, he became the Coordinator of Football Officials for the Big Ten Conference and is currently Coordinator of Officials for the Collegiate Officiating Consortium (COC).

== Personal ==
=== Early life ===
A native of Brookfield, Wisconsin, Carollo attended high school at Brookfield Central High School where he graduated in 1970. Following high school, he attended University of Wisconsin–Milwaukee (UWM) and graduated in 1974 with a degree in industrial relations. At UWM, he was the starting quarterback for the school's football team from 1970 to 1973.

=== Family ===
Carollo currently resides in Shorewood, Wisconsin, and is married and has four children.

=== Other professions ===
Carollo worked as an international account executive for 30 years at IBM before becoming Vice President of Global Sales for Milwaukee, Wisconsin based Manpower Inc.

== Officiating career ==
=== Early years ===
Carollo began his officiating career working Wisconsin high school football, basketball, and baseball games. He joined college football's Big Ten Conference, where he stayed for ten years and included a selection to work the 1988 Rose Bowl Game. In addition to officiating football games in the Big Ten, he was a basketball referee from 1982 to 1988. For a period of time, he also served as the Milwaukee Brewers Official Scorer for the American League.

=== National Football League ===
Carollo started in the NFL as a side judge and officiated Super Bowl XXX in 1996 at that position, then became a referee (crew chief) for the start of the 1997 NFL season after Red Cashion and Howard Roe announced their retirements. Carollo was assigned to work his first post-season as referee during the 1998-99 NFL playoffs and later made his second appearance in the Super Bowl at Super Bowl XXXVII in 2003. Before he officiated Super Bowl XXXVII, Mike Pereira, the NFL's director of officiating, said of Carollo, "Bill is just perfect in the management of a game. He understands how to handle coaches, players and a team of seven officials. He's terrific at that." In addition, he was the alternate referee of Super Bowl XXXVIII.

While serving as referee of the 1999 NFC Championship game between Tampa Bay and St. Louis, Carollo overturned a catch by Tampa Bay's Bert Emanuel, that later led to the adoption of the Bert Emanuel Rule. The play consisted of Bert Emanuel making what was ruled a catch at St. Louis' 22-yard line with 47 seconds left in the game and the Buccaneers down by 5. After review, Carollo ruled that the tip of the ball had touched the ground, and even though Emanuel maintained control of the football, Carollo had to rule it an incomplete pass. This led to the NFL clarifying the definitions of both a catch and an incomplete pass, as to avoid this scenario replaying itself in the future. This is known as the Bert Emanuel Rule.

He served as the director of the NFL Referees Association (NFLRA), the union representing NFL officials, from 2000 to March 1, 2006. He was the center of the negotiations that took place during the 2001 NFL season where there was a work stoppage by game officials. The NFL and its game officials eventually agreed on September 19, 2001, to a new six-year Collective Bargaining Agreement that ended a two-week lockout of the regular officials, who returned to work on September 23, 2001.

Carollo was also the referee of the Houston Texans' inaugural game against the Dallas Cowboys on September 8, 2002.

On November 18, 2007, Carollo became the first referee in 35 years to officiate a game for the same team in back-to-back weeks during the New England-Buffalo game. Bill Leavy was scheduled to officiate the November 11 Buffalo-Miami game, but fell ill. Carollo served as the referee for that contest using Leavy's crew.

In August 2008, Carollo announced he would retire as an NFL referee at the end of the 2008 NFL season to become the Director of Officiating for the Big Ten Conference. His final assignment was for the AFC Championship game between the Pittsburgh Steelers and the Baltimore Ravens on January 18, 2009. Don Carey, brother of NFL referee Mike Carey, was promoted from back judge to take Carollo's place as a crew chief.

In Carollo's twenty-year NFL career he officiated in two Super Bowls, a third SB as alternate referee, eight NFL Conference Championships and one Pro Bowl. Currently Bill is Coordinator of Officials for the Collegiate Officiating Consortium (COC) which includes the Big Ten, Mid-American and Missouri Valley Football conferences. The COC was created in 2009 and headquartered in Rosemont, IL.
