= Lockout (industry) =

Work stoppage by management of a company

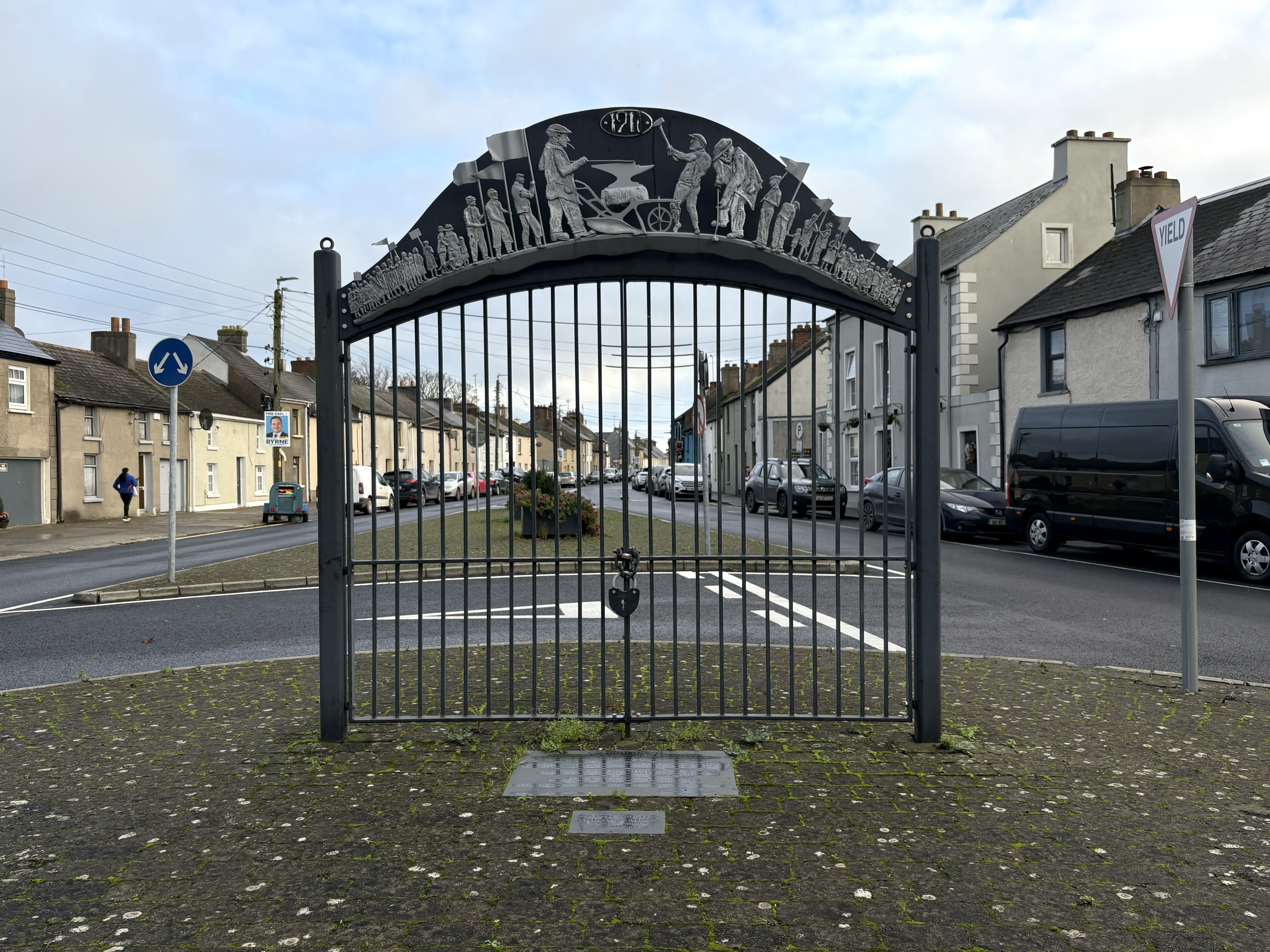
A memorial for the Wexford 1911 Lockout in Ireland.

A lockout is a work stoppage or denial of employment initiated by the management of a company during a labor dispute. In contrast to a strike, in which employees refuse to work, a lockout is initiated by employers or industry owners.

Lockouts are usually implemented by simply refusing to admit employees onto company premises, and may include changing locks or hiring security guards for the premises. Other implementations include a fine for showing up, or a simple refusal of clocking in on the time clock. For these reasons, lockouts are referred to as the antithesis of strikes.

In professional sports in the United States and Canada, the National Football League, Major League Baseball, the National Basketball Association, and the National Hockey League have all locked out players.

== Causes ==
A lockout is generally an attempt to enforce specific terms of employment upon a group of employees during a dispute. It is often used to convince unionized workers to accept new conditions, such as lower wages. If the union is asking for higher wages, better benefits, or maintaining benefits, a manager may use the threat of a lockout – or an actual lockout – to convince the union to relent.

== Examples ==
Far from all labour disputes involve lockouts (or strikes), but lockouts have been used on a large scale around the world during and after industrialization. Some of the lockout incidents are historically significant.

=== Ireland ===
The Dublin Lockout was a major industrial dispute between 20,000 workers and 300 employers in Dublin. The dispute lasted from 26 August 1913 to 18 January 1914, and is often viewed as the most severe and significant industrial dispute in the history of Ireland. Central to the dispute was the right to unionize.

=== United States ===
In the United States, under federal labor law, an employer may hire only temporary replacements during a lockout. In a strike, unless it is an unfair labor practice strike, an employer may legally hire permanent replacements. Also, in many US states, employees who are locked out are eligible to receive unemployment benefits, but they are not eligible for such benefits during a strike.

For the above reasons, many American employers have historically been reluctant to impose lockouts and instead try to provoke a strike. However, as American unions have increasingly begun to resort to slowdowns rather than strikes, lockouts have become a more common tactic of many employers.

In 1892, after several wage cuts and disputes with the employers at the Homestead Steel Mill in Homestead, Pennsylvania, the union called for a strike after the company stopped discussing its decisions with the union. Henry Clay Frick shut down the plant and locked out all workers, preventing them from entering the mill.

Lockouts have also occurred in professional sports, usually due to disputes between team owners and players concerning their league's collective bargaining agreement. Major League Baseball has seen four lockouts in modern history, including during the 1990 and 2021–22 offseasons. The National Basketball Association had four in the 1995 offseason, the 1996 offseason, and the 1998–99 and 2011–12 seasons. The National Hockey League endured lockouts in 1994–95, 2004–05 and 2012–13, with the 2004–05 lockout ultimately resulting in the entire season being canceled. Besides a player lockout in 2011, the National Football League had two involving referees in 2001 and 2012.

In September 2016, Long Island University became the first institution of higher education to use a lockout against its faculty members.

=== Australia ===
On 8 April, 1998, stevedoring company Patrick Corporation sought to restructure its operations for productivity reasons. In an industrial watershed event, it sacked all its workers and imposed a lockout on wharves around Australia.

On 29 October 2011, Qantas declared a lockout of all domestic employees in the face of ongoing union industrial action. They cancelled all flights, grounding the entire fleet for several days.

=== Canada ===
On August 15, 2005, 5,500 employees of the Canadian Broadcasting Corporation, a Canadian public broadcaster were locked out by CEO Robert Rabinovitch in a dispute over future hiring practices. While services continued during the lockout, programming consisted mainly of repeats, with news coverage being provided by the BBC on TV and wire-service feeds on radio. The lock-out ended on October 11, 2005.

In August 2025, Dalhousie University in Halifax, Nova Scotia became the first U15 institution in Canada to initiate a lockout against Dalhousie Faculty Association (DFA), the university's faculty labour union, several days before the union was able to complete their vote on the university's final offer. The university claimed that they did not have the financial capacity to have their wages keep up with inflation; whereas the union claimed that the university favoured spending on infrastructure such as a new sports arena over paying their employees a fair wage.

=== Denmark ===
On 2 April 2013, the Danish Union of Teachers (Danish: Danmarks Lærerforening) and the National Union of Municipalities (Danish: Kommunernes Landsforening) declared a lockout for more than 60,000 primary school teachers across the country. Over 600,000 students were also affected by the lockout and could not go to school.

The dispute was about whether teachers should have extra working time, as the Local Government Association (KL) wanted. The Danish Union of Teachers (DFL) was against it and could not find a solution. After 24 days of being locked out, the teachers lost the labour dispute on 25 April 2013, with a government intervention to end the lockout. The government chose to apply all of KL's main demands, and the teachers received a small wage increase as compensation.

== Lock-in ==
The term lock-in refers to the practice of physically preventing workers from leaving a workplace.

More recently, lock-ins have been carried out by employees against management, which have been labeled 'bossnapping' by the media. In France during March 2009, 3M's national manager was locked in his office for 24 hours by employees in a dispute over redundancies. The following month, union employees of a call center managed by Synovate in Auckland locked the front doors of the office, in response to management locking them out.

== See also ==
- Capital strike
- Dublin Lockout
- FaSinPat, an Argentine recovered factory following a lockout
- Government shutdown
- Lockout (sports)
  - National Hockey League
- Strikebreaker
- Walkout
