= NBA Most Valuable Player =

National Basketball Association award

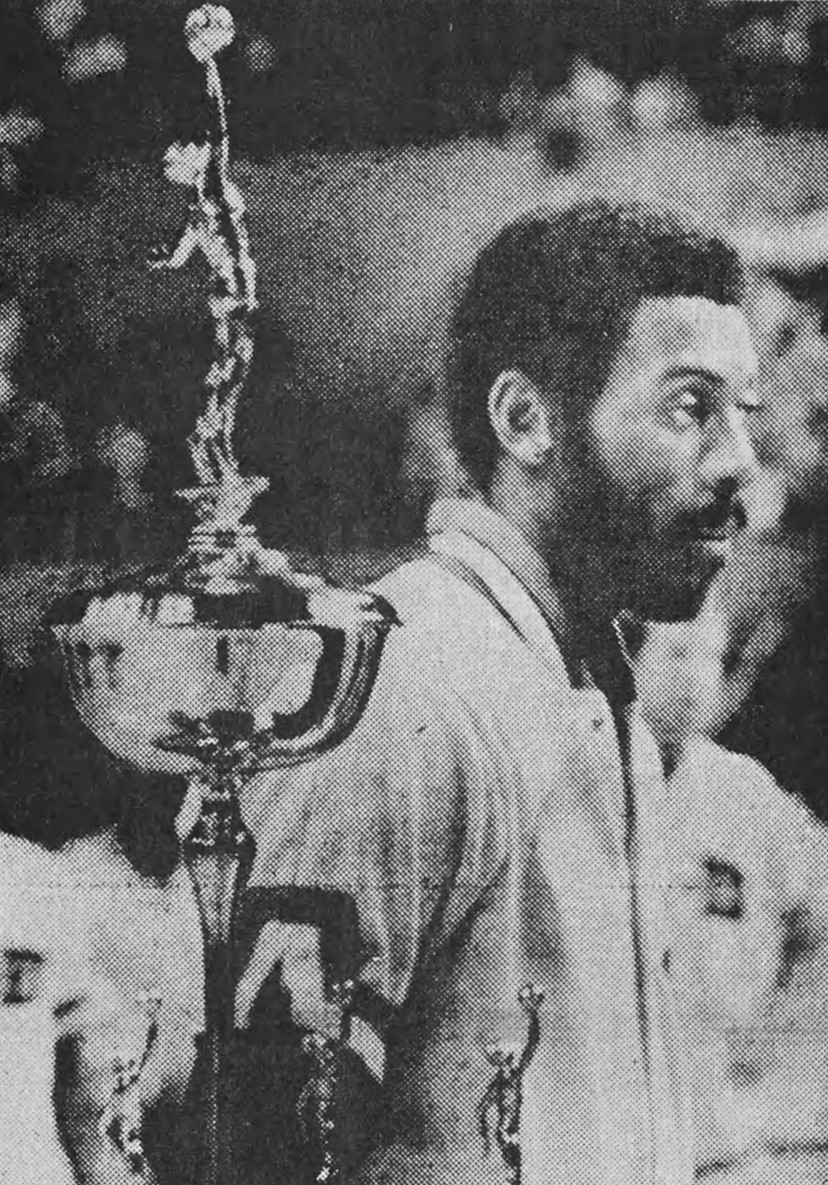
- Bob McAdoo and his 1974–75 NBA Most Valuable Player trophy
- Sport: Basketball
- League: National Basketball Association
- Awarded for: Best performing player in the regular season of the National Basketball Association

History
- First award: 1955–56
- Most wins: Kareem Abdul-Jabbar (6)
- Most recent: Shai Gilgeous-Alexander, Oklahoma City Thunder (2026)

The NBA Most Valuable Player (MVP) is an annual National Basketball Association (NBA) award given since the 1955–56 season to the best performing player of the regular season. Since the 2022–23 season, winners receive the Michael Jordan Trophy, named after the five-time MVP. A total of 36 players have won the award.

Prior to 2021, the winner received the Maurice Podoloff Trophy, which was named in honor of the first commissioner (then president) (Note: The official title of the position was President until 1967 when it was renamed to Commissioner.) of the NBA, who served from 1946 until 1963. With the switch to the Michael Jordan Trophy, his name was moved to a new Maurice Podoloff Trophy given to the team with the best regular season record.

Until the 1979–80 season, the MVP was selected by a vote of NBA players. Since the 1980–81 season, the award is decided by a panel of sportswriters and broadcasters throughout the United States and Canada. Each member of the voting panel casts a vote for first to fifth place selections. Each first-place vote is worth 10 points; each second-place vote is worth seven; each third-place vote is worth five, fourth-place is worth three and fifth-place is worth one. Starting from 2010, one ballot was cast by fans through online voting. The player with the highest point total wins the award. As of the 2025–26 season, the current holder of the award is Shai Gilgeous-Alexander of the Oklahoma City Thunder.

Every player who has won this award and deemed eligible for the Naismith Memorial Basketball Hall of Fame has been inducted. Kareem Abdul-Jabbar won the award a record six times. He is also the only player to win the award despite his team not making the playoffs, in the 1975–76 season. Both Bill Russell and Michael Jordan won the award five times, while Wilt Chamberlain and LeBron James won the award four times. Russell and James are the only players to have won the award four times in five seasons. Moses Malone, Larry Bird, Magic Johnson and Nikola Jokić each won the award three times, while Bob Pettit, Karl Malone, Tim Duncan, Steve Nash, Stephen Curry, Giannis Antetokounmpo, and Shai Gilgeous-Alexander won it twice. Russell, Chamberlain, and Bird are the only players to win the award in three consecutive years. Only two rookies have won the award: Chamberlain (1959–60) and Wes Unseld (1968–69). Eight players who won MVP (combining for thirteen total awards) are considered "international players" by the NBA: Hakeem Olajuwon of Nigeria, (Note: Hakeem Olajuwon was born in Nigeria, but became a naturalized United States citizen in 1993. He was the first ever international player to win the award.) Duncan of the U.S. Virgin Islands, (Note: Although Duncan was born in the U.S. Virgin Islands and is a United States citizen, the NBA considers him an international player.) Nash of Canada, (Note: Steve Nash, who was born in South Africa, was raised in Canada.) Dirk Nowitzki of Germany, Antetokounmpo of Greece, Nikola Jokić of Serbia, Joel Embiid of Cameroon, (Note: Joel Embiid was born in Cameroon, but became a naturalized United States citizen in 2022.) and Shai Gilgeous-Alexander of Canada.

Stephen Curry (2015–16) is the only player to have won the award unanimously. Shaquille O'Neal (1999–2000) and LeBron James (2012–13) are the only two players to have fallen one vote shy of a unanimous selection, both receiving 120 of 121 votes. (Note: Allen Iverson received the only other first-place vote in 2000, while Carmelo Anthony received the only other first-place vote in 2013.) Since the 1975–76 season, only three players have been named MVP for a season in which their team failed to win at least 50 regular season games—Moses Malone (twice, 1978–79 and 1981–82), Russell Westbrook (2016–17) and Nikola Jokić (2021–22). (Note: Except for seasons affected by lockouts and COVID-19, when the schedule was shortened from the norm of 82 games. Karl Malone won in 1998–99 when Utah was 37–13 in 50 games, which projected to 60 wins in 82 games. James won in 2011–12 when the Miami Heat were 46–20 in 66 games, which projected to 57 wins. Nikola Jokić won in 2020–21 when Denver was 47–25 in 72 games, which projected to 54 wins in 82 games.)

As part of efforts to reduce load management for star players in the league, effective with the 2023–24 season, when a new collective bargaining agreement (CBA) between the league and its players' union took effect, players must appear in at least 65 games to be eligible for most regular-season awards and honors, including MVP. To receive credit for a game for purposes of award eligibility, a player must have been credited with at least 20 minutes played. However, two "near misses", in which the player appeared for 15 to 19 minutes, can be included in the 65-game count. Protections also exist for players who suffer season-ending injuries, who are eligible with 62 credited games, and those affected by what the CBA calls "bad faith circumstances".

== Winners ==
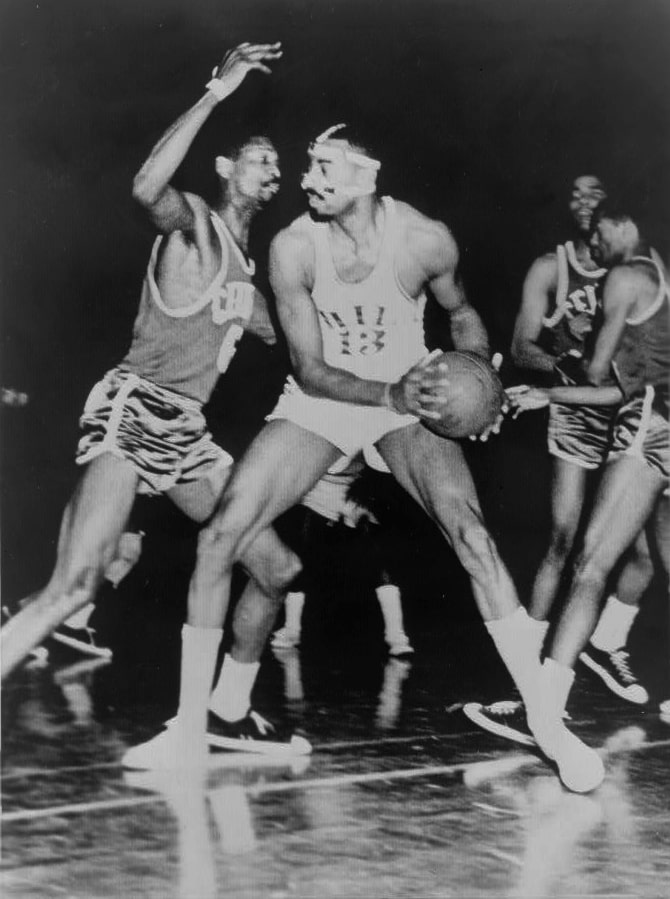
Bill Russell (left) won the award five times in his NBA career. Wilt Chamberlain (center) won the award four times in his career.

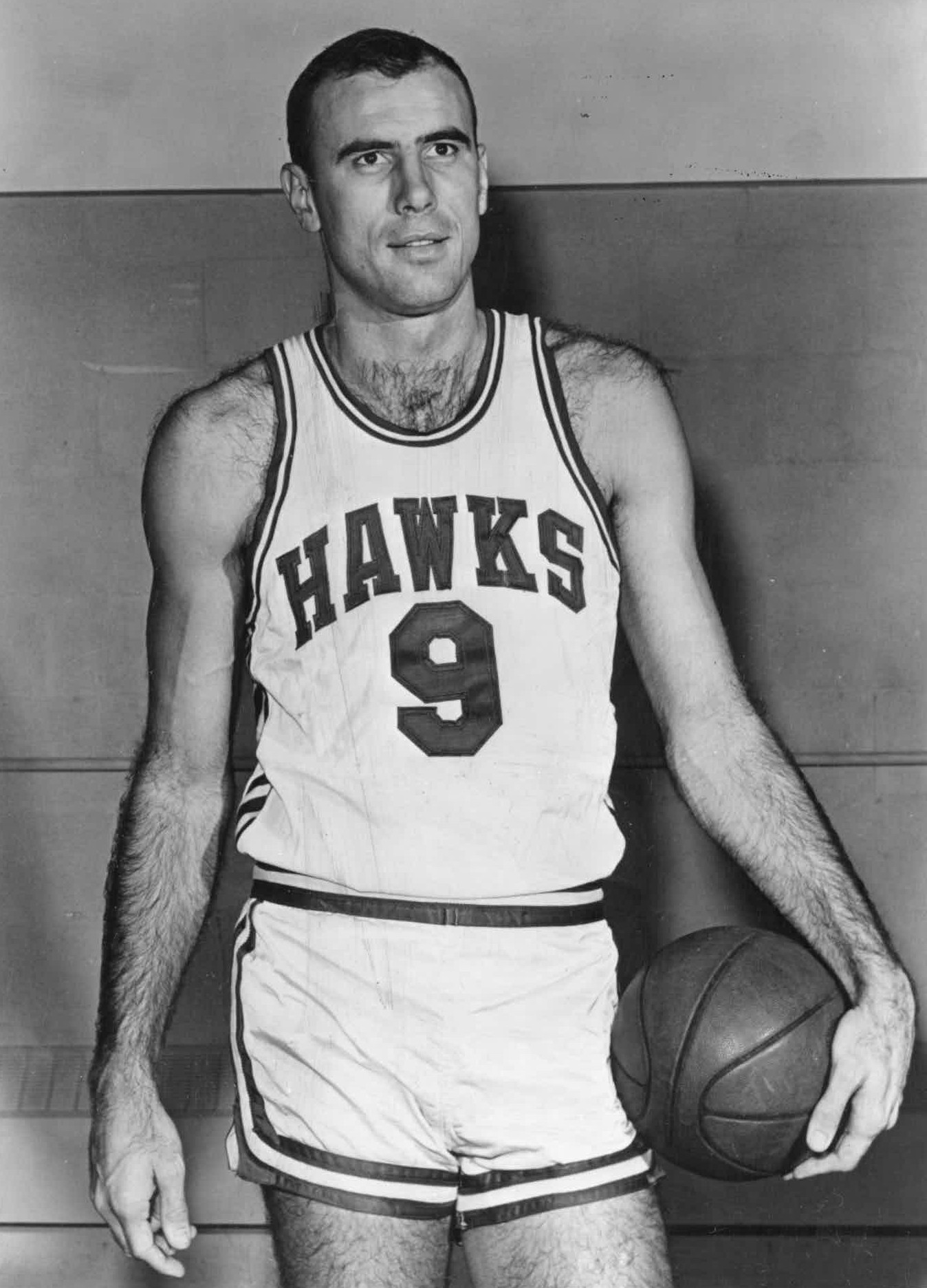
Bob Pettit was the first player to win multiple MVP awards.

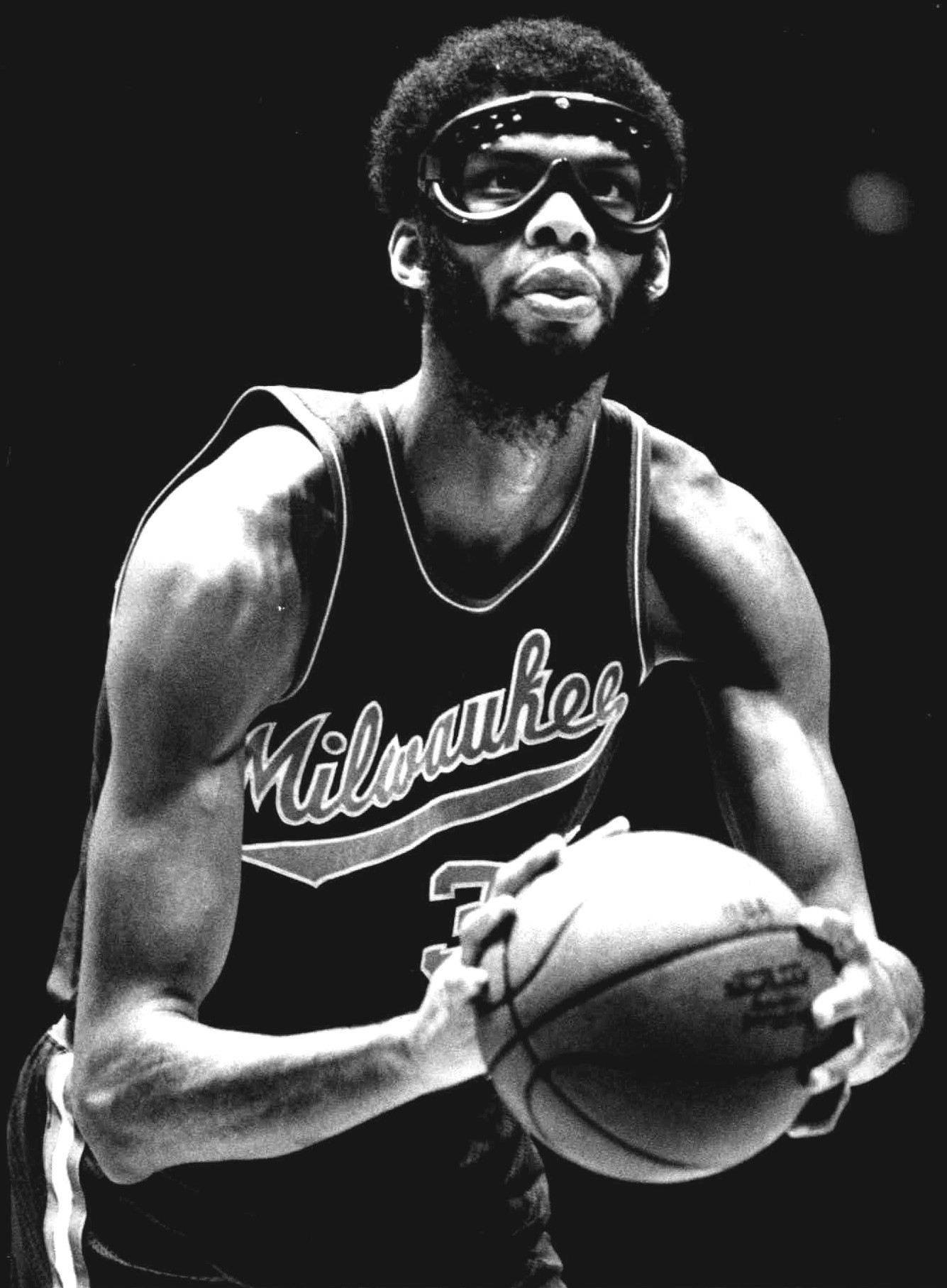
Kareem Abdul-Jabbar won the award a record-setting six times in his career.

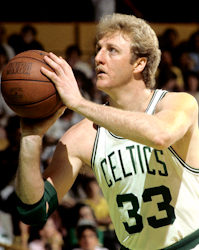
Larry Bird was the last player to win the award in three consecutive years.

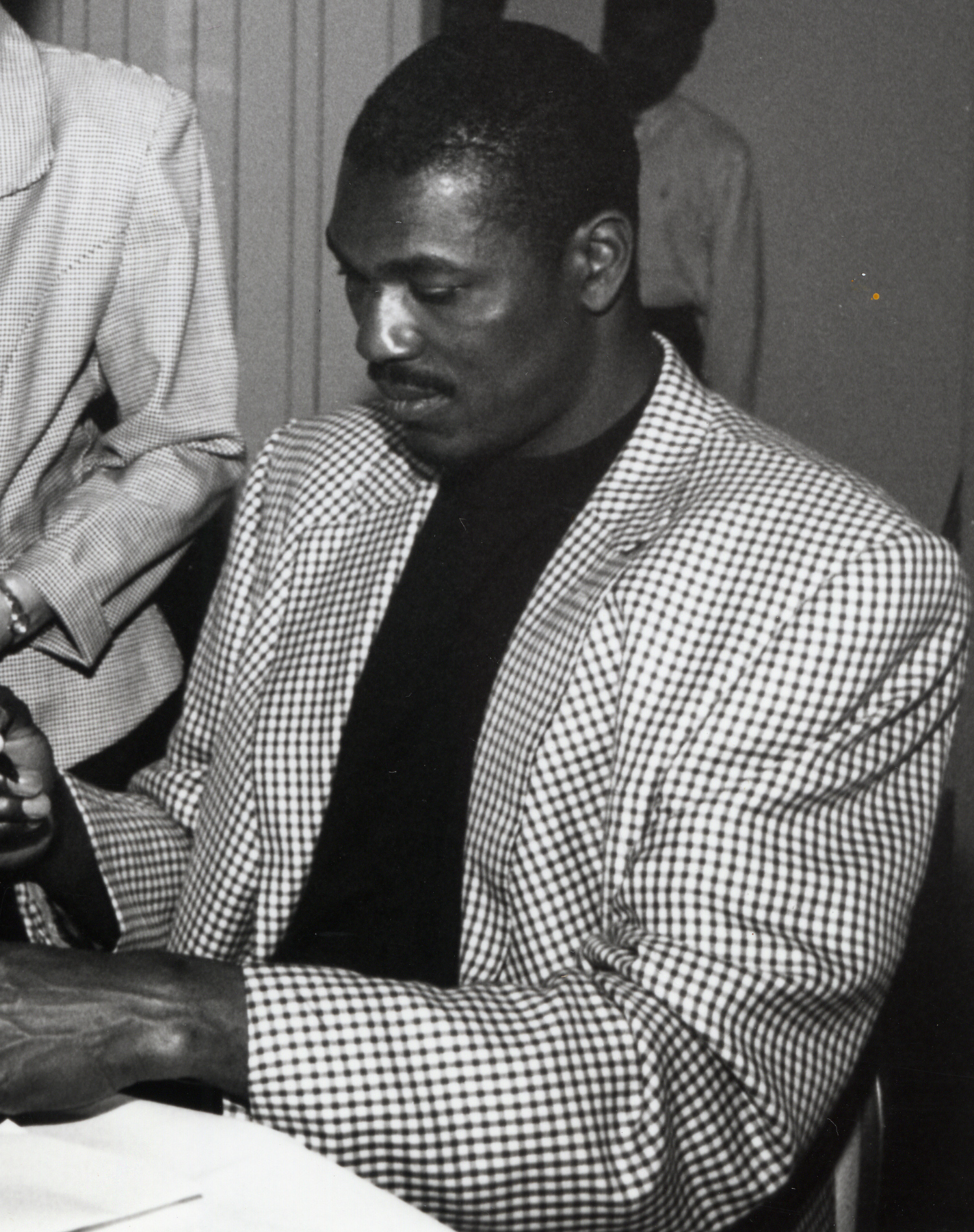
Hakeem Olajuwon is one of three players to win the NBA MVP and the NBA Defensive Player of the Year Award in the same season.

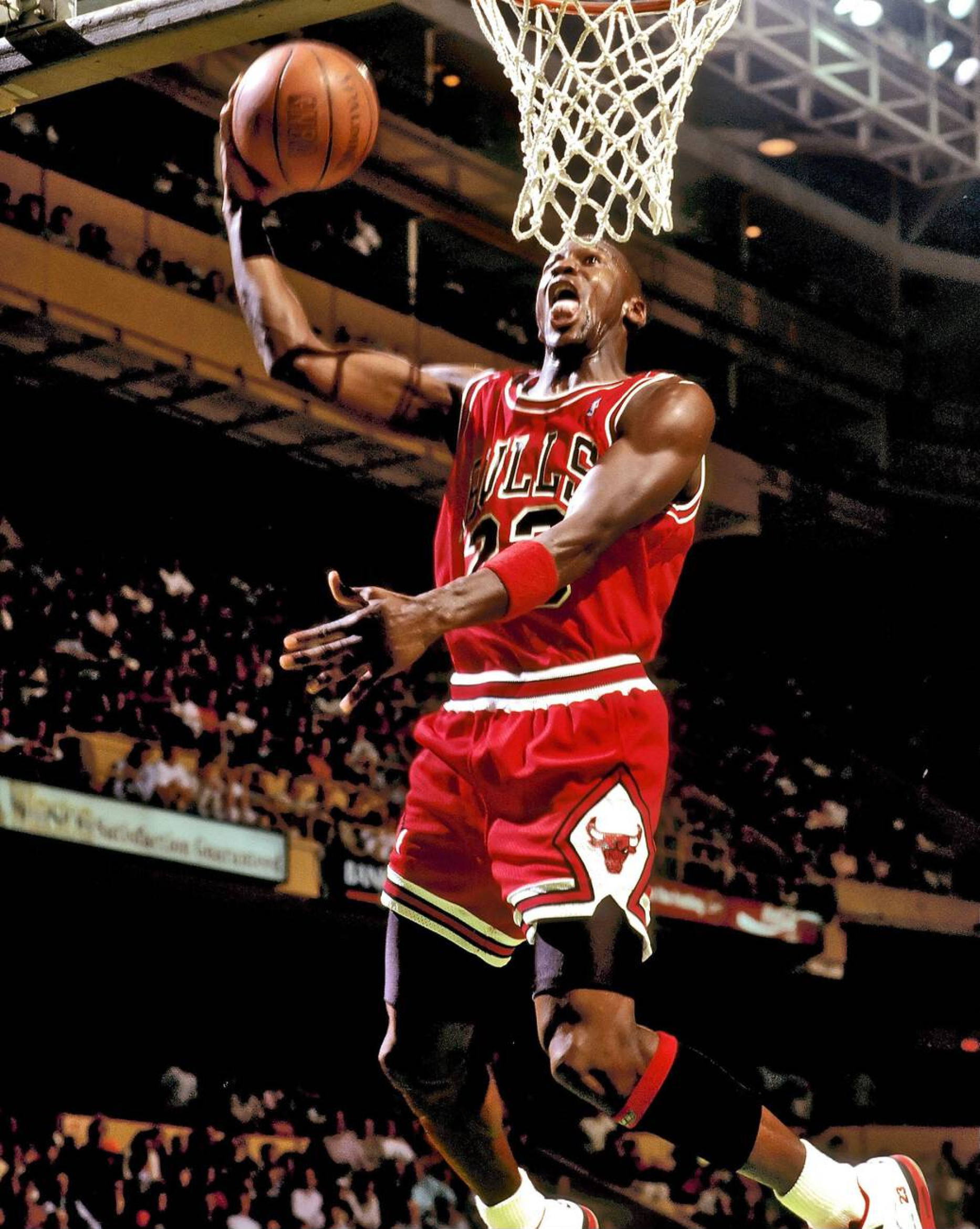
Michael Jordan won the NBA MVP five times.

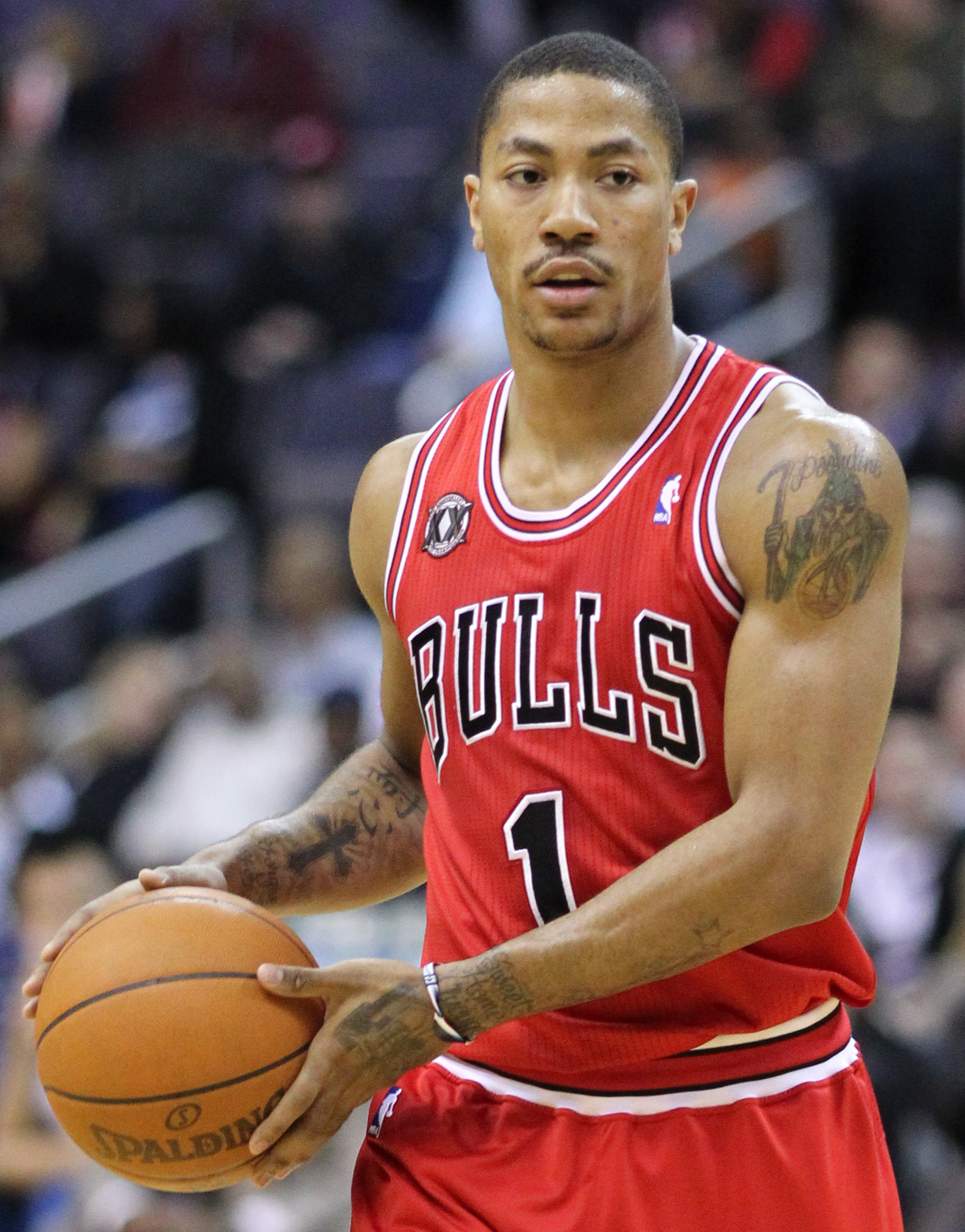
Derrick Rose became the youngest player ever to win the award at age 22.

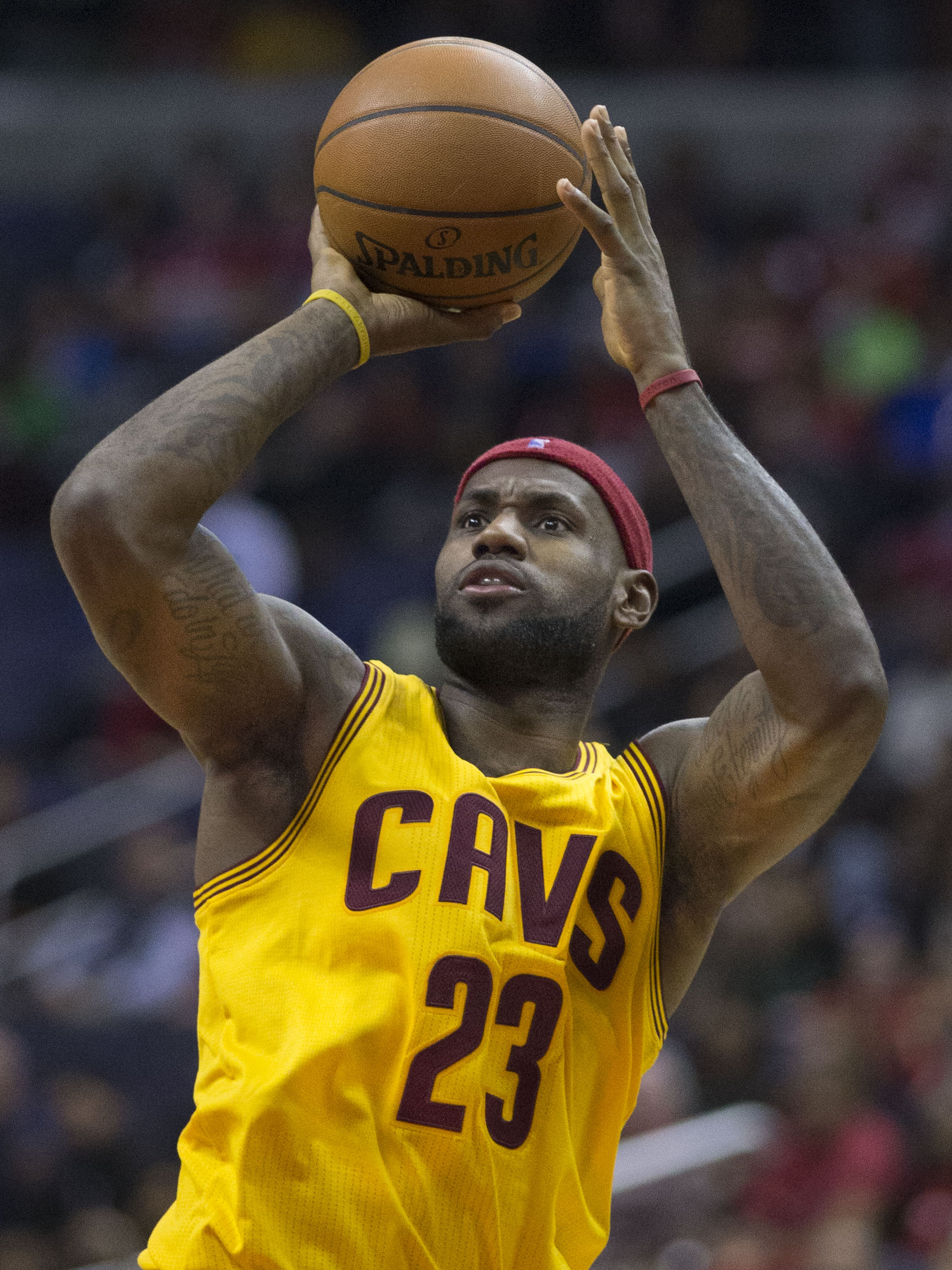
LeBron James is a four-time NBA MVP.

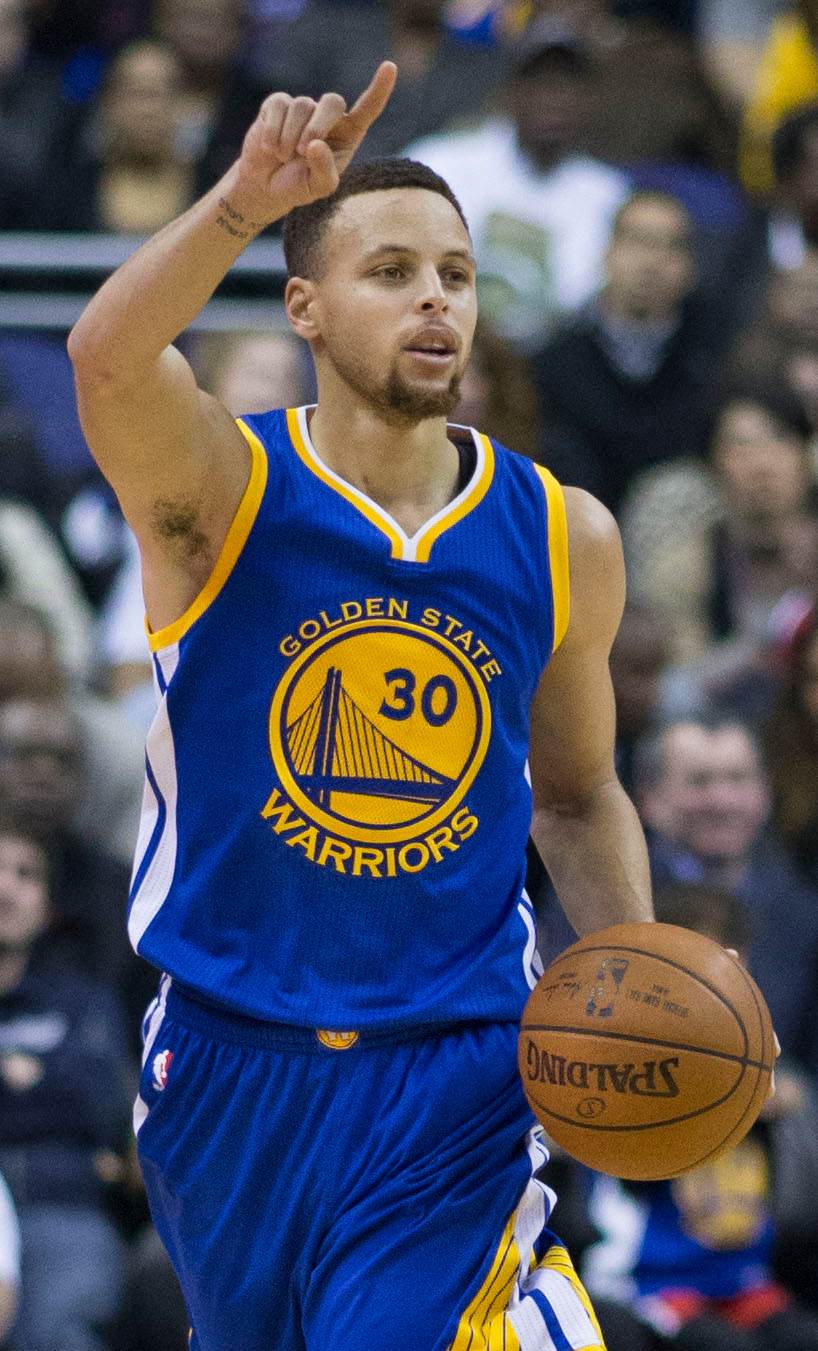
Stephen Curry won back-to-back MVP awards in 2014–15 and 2015–16. He is the first unanimous MVP selection in league history.

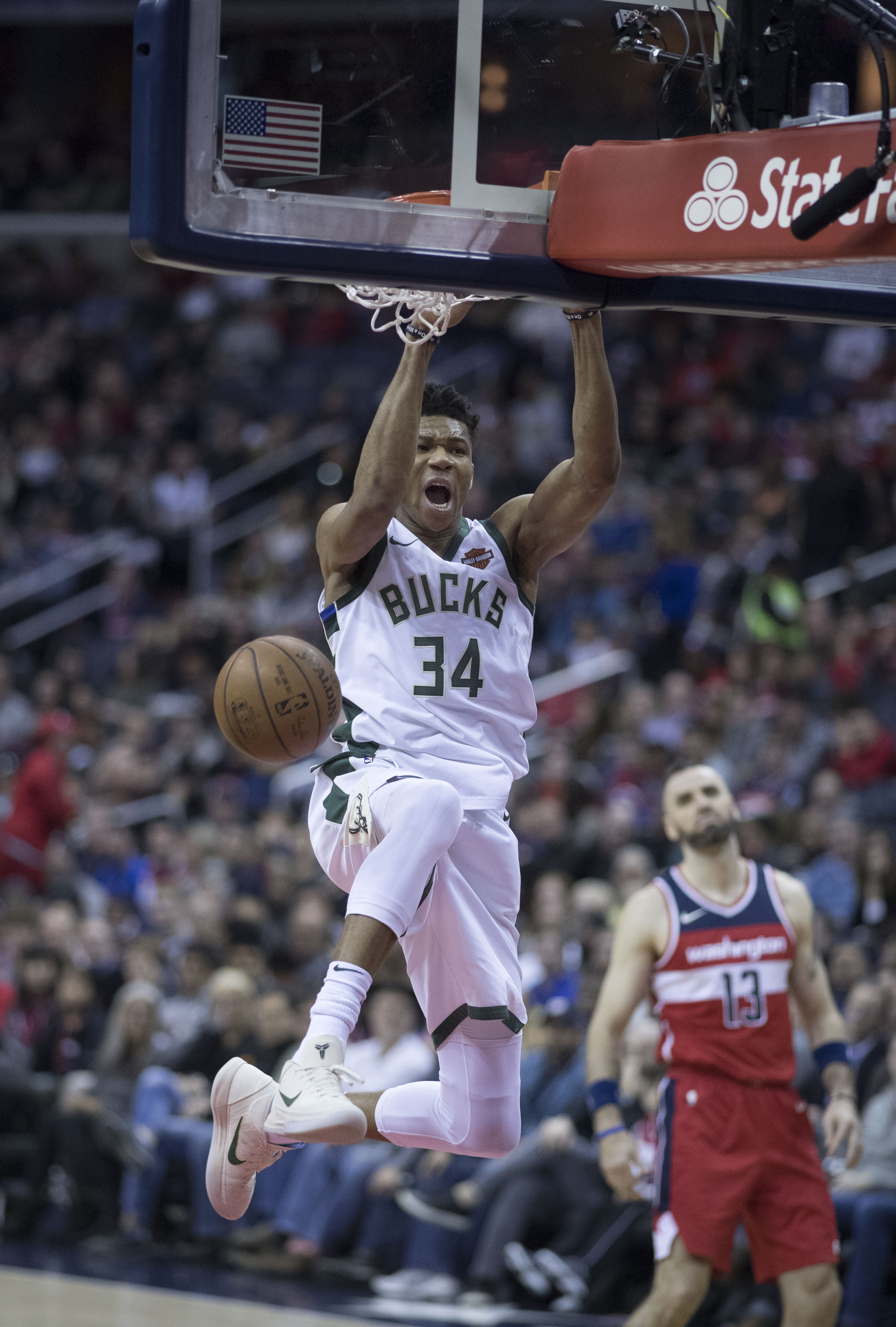
Giannis Antetokounmpo won back-to-back MVP awards in 2018–19 and 2019–20.

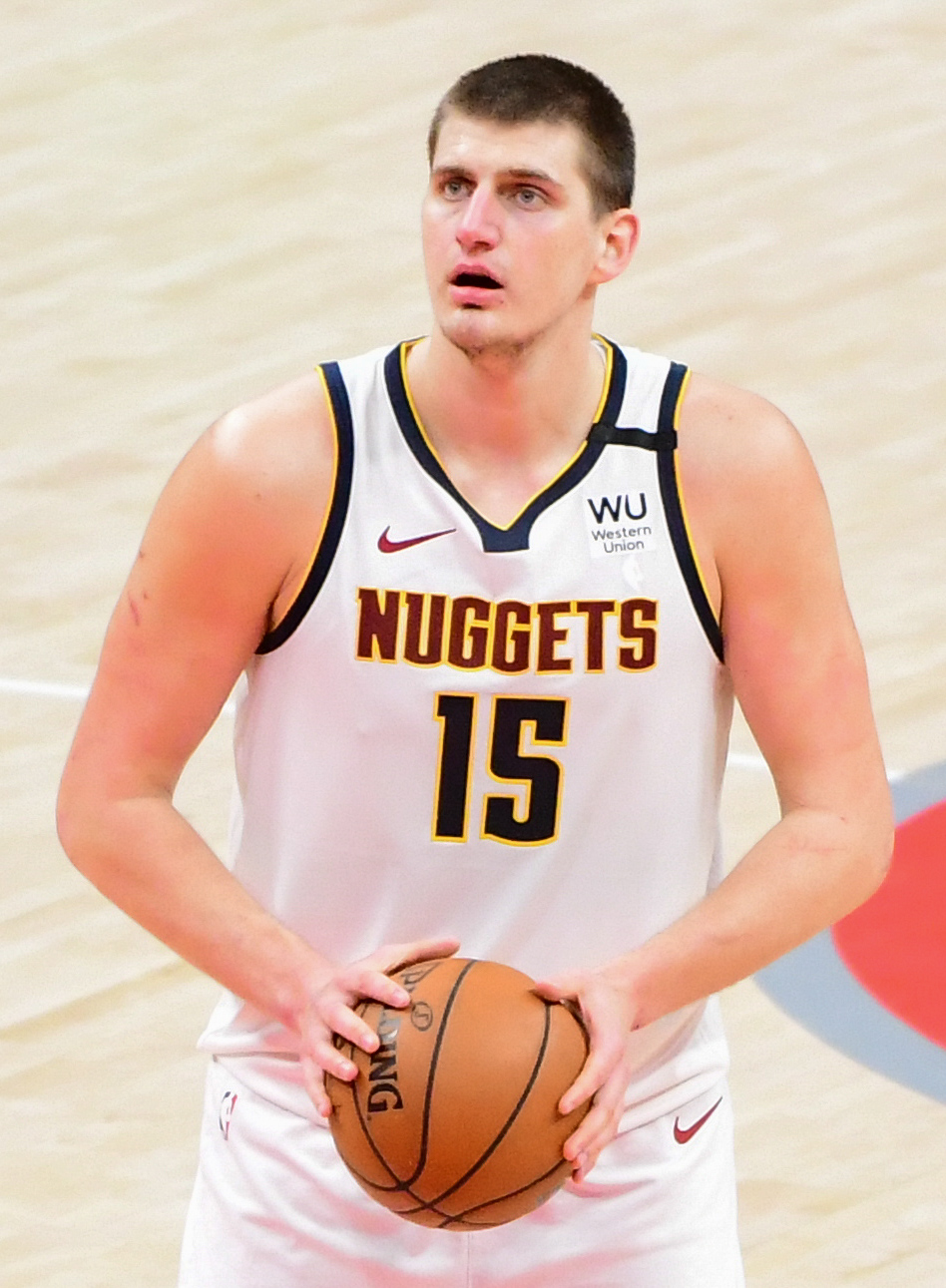
Nikola Jokić won three MVP awards in 2020–21, 2021–22, and 2023–24. He became one of only two players to be selected in the second round of the NBA draft to win the award.

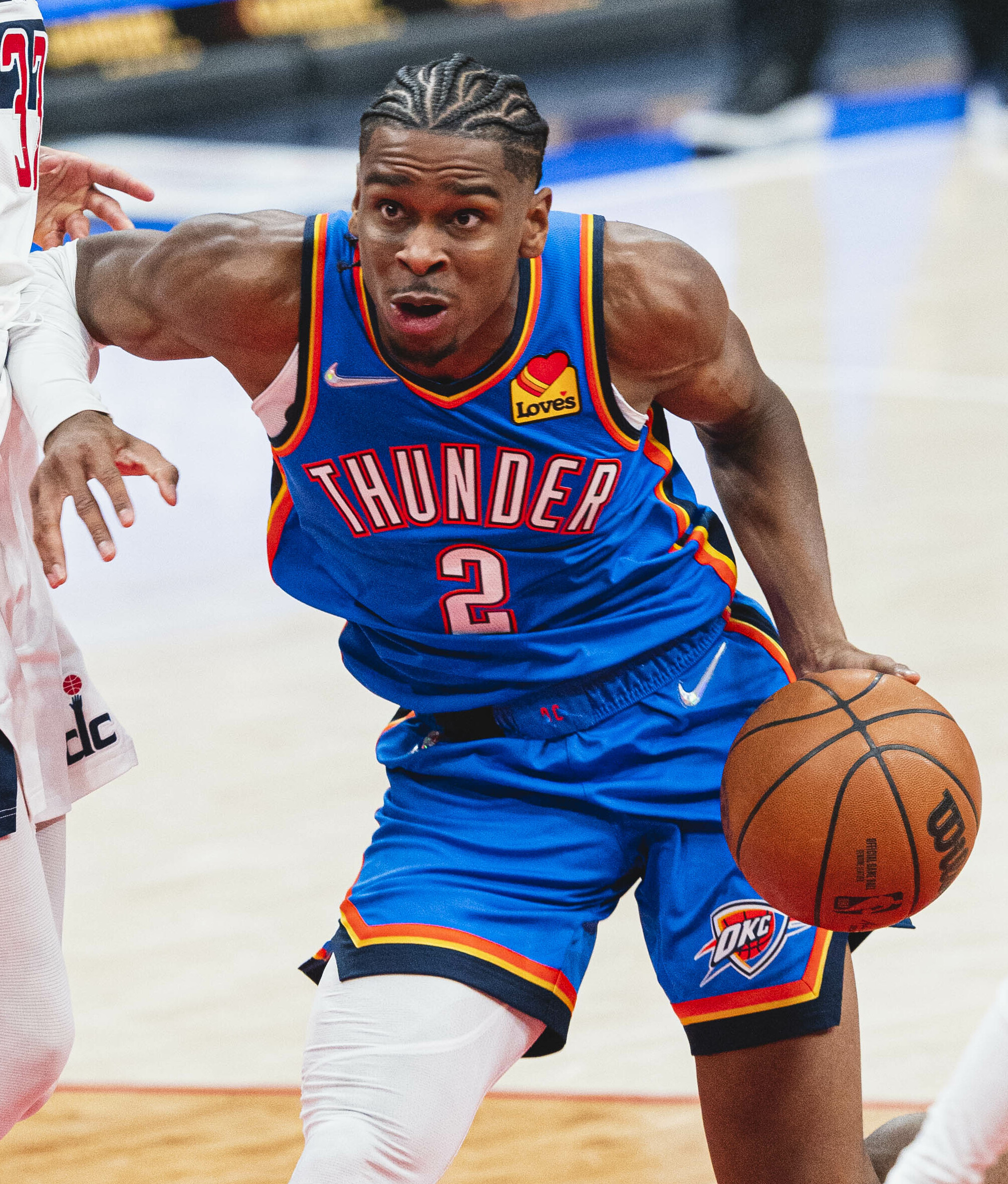
Shai Gilgeous-Alexander won back-to-back MVP awards in 2024-25 and 2025-26. In the 2024-25 season he became the first player since LeBron James in 2012-13 to win MVP, Finals MVP, and the NBA Finals in the same season.

^	Denotes player who is still active in the NBA
*	Inducted into the Naismith Memorial Basketball Hall of Fame
†	Not yet eligible for Hall of Fame consideration (Note: A player is not eligible for induction into the Naismith Memorial Basketball Hall of Fame until he has been fully retired for two calendar years.)
§	1st time eligible for Hall of Fame in 2027
‡	Denotes player whose team won championship that year
Player (#)	Denotes the number of times the player had been named MVP at that time
Team (#)	Denotes the number of times a player from this team had won at that time

Season	Player	Position	Nationality	Team
1955–56	Bob Pettit*	Power forward	United States	St. Louis Hawks
1956–57 ‡	Bob Cousy*	Point guard	United States	Boston Celtics
1957–58	Bill Russell*	Center	United States	Boston Celtics (2)
1958–59	Bob Pettit* (2)	Power forward	United States	St. Louis Hawks (2)
1959–60	Wilt Chamberlain*	Center	United States	Philadelphia Warriors
1960–61 ‡	Bill Russell* (2)	Center	United States	Boston Celtics (3)
1961–62 ‡	Bill Russell* (3)	Center	United States	Boston Celtics (4)
1962–63 ‡	Bill Russell* (4)	Center	United States	Boston Celtics (5)
1963–64	Oscar Robertson*	Point guard	United States	Cincinnati Royals
1964–65 ‡	Bill Russell* (5)	Center	United States	Boston Celtics (6)
1965–66	Wilt Chamberlain* (2)	Center	United States	Philadelphia 76ers
1966–67 ‡	Wilt Chamberlain* (3)	Center	United States	Philadelphia 76ers (2)
1967–68	Wilt Chamberlain* (4)	Center	United States	Philadelphia 76ers (3)
1968–69	Wes Unseld*	Center	United States	Baltimore Bullets
1969–70 ‡	Willis Reed*	Center	United States	New York Knicks
1970–71 ‡	Lew Alcindor* (Note: Before the 1971–72 season, Lew Alcindor changed his name to Kareem Abdul-Jabbar.)	Center	United States	Milwaukee Bucks
1971–72	Kareem Abdul-Jabbar* (2)	Center	United States	Milwaukee Bucks (2)
1972–73	Dave Cowens*	Center	United States	Boston Celtics (7)
1973–74	Kareem Abdul-Jabbar* (3)	Center	United States	Milwaukee Bucks (3)
1974–75	Bob McAdoo*	Center	United States	Buffalo Braves
1975–76	Kareem Abdul-Jabbar* (4)	Center	United States	Los Angeles Lakers
1976–77	Kareem Abdul-Jabbar* (5)	Center	United States	Los Angeles Lakers (2)
1977–78	Bill Walton*	Center	United States	Portland Trail Blazers
1978–79	Moses Malone*	Center	United States	Houston Rockets
1979–80 ‡	Kareem Abdul-Jabbar* (6)	Center	United States	Los Angeles Lakers (3)
1980–81	Julius Erving*	Small forward	United States	Philadelphia 76ers (4)
1981–82	Moses Malone* (2)	Center	United States	Houston Rockets (2)
1982–83 ‡	Moses Malone* (3)	Center	United States	Philadelphia 76ers (5)
1983–84 ‡	Larry Bird*	Small forward	United States	Boston Celtics (8)
1984–85	Larry Bird* (2)	Small forward	United States	Boston Celtics (9)
1985–86 ‡	Larry Bird* (3)	Small forward	United States	Boston Celtics (10)
1986–87 ‡	Magic Johnson*	Point guard	United States	Los Angeles Lakers (4)
1987–88	Michael Jordan*	Shooting guard	United States	Chicago Bulls
1988–89	Magic Johnson* (2)	Point guard	United States	Los Angeles Lakers (5)
1989–90	Magic Johnson* (3)	Point guard	United States	Los Angeles Lakers (6)
1990–91 ‡	Michael Jordan* (2)	Shooting guard	United States	Chicago Bulls (2)
1991–92 ‡	Michael Jordan* (3)	Shooting guard	United States	Chicago Bulls (3)
1992–93	Charles Barkley*	Power forward	United States	Phoenix Suns
1993–94 ‡	Hakeem Olajuwon*	Center	Nigeria	Houston Rockets (3)
1994–95	David Robinson*	Center	United States	San Antonio Spurs
1995–96 ‡	Michael Jordan* (4)	Shooting guard	United States	Chicago Bulls (4)
1996–97	Karl Malone*	Power forward	United States	Utah Jazz
1997–98 ‡	Michael Jordan* (5)	Shooting guard	United States	Chicago Bulls (5)
1998–99	Karl Malone* (2) (Note: Malone, at 35 years and 284 days old at the end of the regular season, is the oldest MVP in NBA history.)	Power forward	United States	Utah Jazz (2)
1999–00 ‡	Shaquille O'Neal*	Center	United States	Los Angeles Lakers (7)
2000–01	Allen Iverson*	Shooting guard	United States	Philadelphia 76ers (6)
2001–02	Tim Duncan*	Power forward	United States	San Antonio Spurs (2)
2002–03 ‡	Tim Duncan* (2)	Power forward	United States	San Antonio Spurs (3)
2003–04	Kevin Garnett*	Power forward	United States	Minnesota Timberwolves
2004–05	Steve Nash*	Point guard	Canada	Phoenix Suns (2)
2005–06	Steve Nash* (2)	Point guard	Canada	Phoenix Suns (3)
2006–07	Dirk Nowitzki*	Power forward	Germany	Dallas Mavericks
2007–08	Kobe Bryant*	Shooting guard	United States	Los Angeles Lakers (8)
2008–09	LeBron James^	Small forward	United States	Cleveland Cavaliers
2009–10	LeBron James^ (2)	Small forward	United States	Cleveland Cavaliers (2)
2010–11	Derrick Rose^{§} (Note: Rose, at 22 years and 191 days old at the end of the regular season, is the youngest MVP in NBA history.)	Point guard	United States	Chicago Bulls (6)
2011–12 ‡	LeBron James^ (3)	Small forward	United States	Miami Heat
2012–13 ‡	LeBron James^ (4)	Small forward	United States	Miami Heat (2)
2013–14	Kevin Durant^	Small forward	United States	Oklahoma City Thunder
2014–15 ‡	Stephen Curry^	Point guard	United States	Golden State Warriors (2)
2015–16	Stephen Curry^ (2)	Point guard	United States	Golden State Warriors (3)
2016–17	Russell Westbrook^{†}	Point guard	United States	Oklahoma City Thunder (2)
2017–18	James Harden^	Shooting guard	United States	Houston Rockets (4)
2018–19	Giannis Antetokounmpo^	Power forward	Greece	Milwaukee Bucks (4)
2019–20	Giannis Antetokounmpo^ (2)	Power forward	Greece	Milwaukee Bucks (5)
2020–21	Nikola Jokić^	Center	Serbia	Denver Nuggets
2021–22	Nikola Jokić^ (2)	Center	Serbia	Denver Nuggets (2)
2022–23	Joel Embiid^	Center	Cameroon	Philadelphia 76ers (7)
2023–24	Nikola Jokić^ (3)	Center	Serbia	Denver Nuggets (3)
2024–25 ‡	Shai Gilgeous-Alexander^	Point guard	Canada	Oklahoma City Thunder (3)
2025–26	Shai Gilgeous-Alexander^ (2)	Point guard	Canada	Oklahoma City Thunder (4)

== Multi-time winners ==
Awards	Player	Team(s)	Years
6	(United States) Kareem Abdul-Jabbar	Milwaukee Bucks (3) / Los Angeles Lakers (3)	1971, 1972, 1974, 1976, 1977, 1980
5	(United States) Michael Jordan	Chicago Bulls	1988, 1991, 1992, 1996, 1998
5	(United States) Bill Russell	Boston Celtics	1958, 1961, 1962, 1963, 1965
4	(United States) Wilt Chamberlain	Philadelphia Warriors (1) / Philadelphia 76ers (3)	1960, 1966, 1967, 1968
4	(United States) LeBron James	Cleveland Cavaliers (2) / Miami Heat (2)	2009, 2010, 2012, 2013
3	(United States) Larry Bird	Boston Celtics	1984, 1985, 1986
3	(United States) Magic Johnson	Los Angeles Lakers	1987, 1989, 1990
3	(Serbia) Nikola Jokić	Denver Nuggets	2021, 2022, 2024
3	(United States) Moses Malone	Houston Rockets (2) / Philadelphia 76ers (1)	1979, 1982, 1983
2	(Greece) Giannis Antetokounmpo	Milwaukee Bucks	2019, 2020
2	(United States) Stephen Curry	Golden State Warriors	2015, 2016
2	(United States) Tim Duncan	San Antonio Spurs	2002, 2003
2	(Canada) Shai Gilgeous-Alexander	Oklahoma City Thunder	2025, 2026
2	(United States) Karl Malone	Utah Jazz	1997, 1999
2	(Canada) Steve Nash	Phoenix Suns	2005, 2006
2	(United States) Bob Pettit	St. Louis Hawks	1956, 1959

== Teams ==
Awards	Teams	Years
10	Boston Celtics	1957, 1958, 1961, 1962, 1963, 1965, 1973, 1984, 1985, 1986
8	Los Angeles Lakers	1976, 1977, 1980, 1987, 1989, 1990, 2000, 2008
7	Philadelphia 76ers	1966, 1967, 1968, 1981, 1983, 2001, 2023
6	Chicago Bulls	1988, 1991, 1992, 1996, 1998, 2011
5	Milwaukee Bucks	1971, 1972, 1974, 2019, 2020
4	Houston Rockets	1979, 1982, 1994, 2018
4	Oklahoma City Thunder	2014, 2017, 2025, 2026
3	Denver Nuggets	2021, 2022, 2024
3	Philadelphia / Golden State Warriors	1960, 2015, 2016
3	Phoenix Suns	1993, 2005, 2006
3	San Antonio Spurs	1995, 2002, 2003
2	St. Louis Hawks (now Atlanta Hawks)	1956, 1959
2	Cleveland Cavaliers	2009, 2010
2	Miami Heat	2012, 2013
2	Utah Jazz	1997, 1999
1	Baltimore Bullets (now Washington Wizards)	1969
1	Buffalo Braves (now Los Angeles Clippers)	1975
1	Cincinnati Royals (now Sacramento Kings)	1964
1	Dallas Mavericks	2007
1	Minnesota Timberwolves	2004
1	New York Knicks	1970
1	Portland Trail Blazers	1978
0	Brooklyn Nets	None
0	Charlotte Hornets	None
0	Detroit Pistons	None
0	Indiana Pacers	None
0	Memphis Grizzlies	None
0	New Orleans Pelicans	None
0	Orlando Magic	None
0	Toronto Raptors	None

== By country ==
Awards	Country	Years
59	United States	1956–1993, 1995–2004, 2008–2018
4	Canada	2005, 2006, 2025, 2026
3	Serbia	2021, 2022, 2024
2	Greece	2019, 2020
1	Nigeria	1994
1	Germany	2007
1	Cameroon	2023

== See also ==
- Bill Russell NBA Finals Most Valuable Player Award
- NBA Conference Finals Most Valuable Player Award
- NBA All-Star Game Kobe Bryant Most Valuable Player Award
- NBA G League Most Valuable Player Award
- NBL (United States) Most Valuable Player Award
- NBA records
