= Ben Dogra =

American sports agent

Ben Dogra was an American sports agent who, until July 2006, headed the Football Division of SFX Football, with associate Mark Heligman.

He began his career in 1993 as an intern at SMG in St. Louis and later became a prominent sports agent, being named the 6th Most Powerful Sports Agent by Sports Business Journal in 2008. He was co-head of CAA Football with Tom Condon until his release in 2014 amid rumors of starting his own agency. In 2019, Dogra sued former client Robert Griffin III, alleging unpaid marketing and endorsement fees.

Dogra's NFL clients have included notable players such as QB Robert Griffin III, RB Adrian Peterson, WR Braylon Edwards, LB Patrick Willis, and DE Mario Williams.

== Early life and education ==
Dogra graduated from George Mason University with a B.S. in economics, then earned his Juris Doctor degree from St. Louis University School of Law.

== Career ==
He previously worked with Jim Steiner in St. Louis, at SMG (now SFX Sports Group, which is a subsidiary of Clear Channel Entertainment).

Dogra got his start in 1993 as an intern at SMG. Dogra was named the 6th Most Powerful Sports Agent in 2008 by Sports Business Journal. He has also represented more first round draft choices than any other NFL agent since 2004.

Dogra was formerly co-head of CAA Football with Tom Condon. CAA released Dogra on November 13, 2014, for probable cause due to rumors of him starting his own sports agency.

On March 26, 2019, Dogra sued former client Robert Griffin III for $685,000 as a result of Griffin allegedly not paying his 15% of marketing and endorsement fees as stated in his contract with Dogra. According to court filings, Griffin paid Dogra $12,975 of an invoice of $389,803 in fees in 2014, $36,371 of $258,559, and no money of $58,714 in fees in 2018.

== NFL client base ==
A few of Dogra's and the rest of CAA's NFL clients include:

QB Robert Griffin III, Baltimore Ravens; 2012-2018

RB Adrian Peterson, Washington Redskins;

RB Jonathan Stewart, Free Agent;

RB Joseph Addai, Retired;

WR Roy Williams, Retired;

WR Braylon Edwards, Retired;

WR Lee Evans, Retired;

OL Andre Smith, Minnesota Vikings

LB DeMeco Ryans, Retired;

LB Patrick Willis, Retired;

LB London Fletcher Retired;

CB Terence Newman, Retired;

DE Mario Williams, Retired;
