= NFL lockout =

NFL lockout may refer to any of the lockouts or strikes in the history of the National Football League:

- 1968 NFL strike/lockout, 12-day strike and lockout before the 1968 NFL season
- 1970 NFL strike, two-day strike prior to the 1970 NFL season
- 1974 NFL strike, two-month strike before the 1974 NFL season
- 1982 NFL strike, eight-week strike during the 1982 NFL season
- 1987 NFL strike, one-month strike during the 1987 NFL season
- 2001 NFL referee lockout, two-week lockout of the NFL referees in 2001
- 2011 NFL lockout, five-month lockout prior to the 2011 NFL season
- 2012 NFL referee lockout, four-month lockout of the NFL referees before and during the 2012 NFL season

== See also ==
- MLB lockout
- MLS lockout
- NBA lockout
- NHL lockout
