= NFL Referees Association =

NFL labor union

- Abbreviation: NFLPA
- Formation: 1972; 54 years ago
- Type: Trade union
- Legal status: 501(c)(5) organization
- Location: United States
- Executive director: Scott H. Green
- President: Carl Paganelli
- Website: nflra.com

The National Football League Referees Association (NFLRA), established in 1972 as the Professional Football Referees Association, is a labor union that serves as the collective bargaining agency for game officials with the National Football League (NFL).

The NFLRA has been involved in two work stoppages, lock outs taking place in 2001 and 2012. Its members are currently under contract with the league in a collective bargaining agreement signed in September 2019 and running through May 2026.

== Organizational history ==
In July 1966, ahead of a regularly scheduled clinic for game officials employed by the National Football League (NFL) in Chicago, referee Stan Javie announced that an effort would be made to organize a trade union to bargain for higher game fees paid to officials by the league for working its games. An opposing faction, headed by referee Tommy Bell also emerged at this meeting, who made the argument that increases in game fees could be won without establishment of a union. After protracted discussion and debate, a vote was taken and by a count of 34 to 17 the decision was made to establish a collective bargaining unit, financed by dues payments of $50 per member per year. A five-member negotiating committee was named to go to New York to meet with league commissioner Pete Rozelle, the representative of team owners.

Further organizing effort was made at the annual NFL officials' clinic held in 1968 in Denver, when 53 NFL game officials were joined by 34 officials from the American Football League (AFL), which was scheduled to merge with the NFL following the 1969 football season. The game officials of the two leagues remained in informal contact through 1971. Early in March 1972 the organization was formally incorporated following a meeting in St. Louis as the "Professional Football Referees Corporation." This name was subsequently changed to "Professional Football Referees Association". Ed Marion was selected as president of the new organization, and executive officers and a five-person board of directors were named.

Although the position of "referee" is very specific under football rules, one of five officials specified under article 2 of NFL rule 13, an error by the lawyer drawing up the articles of incorporation rendered the name of the group as "Professional Football Referees Association" (PFRA). This imprecise moniker remained unchanged until 2000. The union was registered as a non-profit organization in 1975.

At the time of the organization's formation, professional game officials received payment from the league ranging from $250 to $500 per game according to the NFL league office—an amount equating to $3,500 to $7,000 per year for a 14-game season. Officials selected to work games in the postseason made $700 in the first round of the playoffs, $1,000 in the conference championships, and $1,500 for working the Super Bowl.

=== Pension benefits ===
In 1974, President Ed Marion was given a lifetime appointment to a new position, that of executive director, with another person elected president. Over further objection by a minority faction organized by Tommy Bell, a campaign was launched for the establishment of pensions for retired officials. Marion was allowed to make a presentation to the 1974 annual owners' meeting in Florida, which was met sympathetically, with the result that an annual pension of $200 per month was granted to any officials retiring after the 1974 NFL season.

This concession did not grant pension benefits back to the establishment of the informal united organization in 1968, however, and the union's membership voted to retroactively self-fund a similar benefit for the ten officials who had retired in the interim. Every official was assessed fees totaling $400 between 1974 and 1978 and union initiation fees increased from $150 to $250 by 1984 to fund this supplemental pension, which continued to be paid out until the death of the last member of the affected group in 2009.
