= MLB lockout =

MLB lockout may refer to one of the following lockouts or strike actions in Major League Baseball:

- The 1972 Major League Baseball strike, which canceled 86 games
- The 1973 Major League Baseball lockout, which cancelled no games
- The 1976 Major League Baseball lockout, which cancelled no games
- The 1980 Major League Baseball strike, which cancelled no games
- The 1981 Major League Baseball strike, which cancelled 713 games
- The 1985 Major League Baseball strike, which cancelled no games
- The 1990 Major League Baseball lockout, which cancelled no games but postponed 1990's opening day to April 9
- The 1994–95 Major League Baseball strike, which cancelled 938 games and the entire 1994 postseason, including the 1994 World Series
- The 2021–22 Major League Baseball lockout, which cancelled no games but postponed 2022's opening day to April 7

== See also ==
- MLS lockout
- NBA lockout
- NFL lockout
- NHL lockout
