= 2012 NFL referee lockout =

Labor dispute in American football

- Date: June 1, 2012 – September 29, 2012 (3 months, 3 weeks and 4 days)
- Location: United States
- Caused by: Expiration of the 2005 NFL referee collective bargaining agreement after the 2011 NFL season; Failure to agree on a new agreement for referees ahead of the 2012 NFL season
- Result: Replacement referees hired on June 4 to work the preseason with work continuing into the first four weeks of the regular season; Lockout suspended on September 26 due to controversy involving replacement referees; New collective bargaining agreement ratified on September 29; Referees are hired to full-time positions beginning with the 2013 NFL season

Parties
NFL Referees Association (NFLRA)	National Football League (NFL)

The 2012 NFL referee lockout was a labor dispute between the National Football League (NFL) and the NFL Referees Association (NFLRA) that resulted in the use of replacement officials through Week 3 of the 2012 NFL season. The lockout began in June 2012 after both sides failed to reach consensus on a collective bargaining agreement. On September 26, 2012, an agreement was reached to end the lockout after increasing criticism of the NFL and the performance of the replacement officials, culminating in the "Fail Mary" game between the Seattle Seahawks and the Green Bay Packers.

== Timeline ==
In 2005, the National Football League (NFL) and National Football League Referees Association (NFLRA) agreed to a contract that would last through the 2011 season. In 2011, the officials' union had planned to exercise a contract clause to reopen negotiations a year early, but this failed to occur due to the 2011 NFL lockout.

By June 2012, the league and the officials' union had not yet come to terms on a new collective bargaining agreement, thus failing to resolve the labor dispute. On June 4, 2012, the NFL announced it would begin hiring replacement officials.

After being locked out, the NFL Referees Association accused the league of planning to lock them out all along rather than negotiate a new contract. The union contended that the lockout would jeopardize the safety of the players and the integrity of the game, citing the fact that none of the replacement officials would come from the top college divisions and thus would not have enough experience to adjust to the speed of the NFL game or enforce the various players' safety rules. The NFL denied these claims, saying that they negotiated in good faith.

In July 2012, the NFL Referees Association filed a complaint with the National Labor Relations Board, accusing the league of unfair labor practices.

=== Agreement ===
On September 26, 2012, an agreement was reached between the NFL and the NFL Referees Association to end the lockout after mounting criticism of the NFL and the performance of the replacement officials. The agreement was assisted by the Federal Mediation and Conciliation Service, and was ratified by the NFL Referees Association. Carl Johnson, the NFL's former vice president of officiating, was announced as the league's first full-time, on-field game official on December 12, 2012.

The new eight-year agreement covers the 2012–2019 seasons and stipulates that current officials will retain their defined benefit plans until 2016 or until an official earns 20 years of service. Beginning in 2017, all officials and new hires will switch to 401(k) plans with an average current league contribution of $18,000 up to an average of $23,000 by 2019. In addition, compensation for officials will increase from an average of $149,000 a year in 2011 to $173,000 in 2013, then up to $205,000 in 2019.

Beginning in 2013, the NFL will have the option of hiring a to-be-determined number of full-time officials to work year-round, including on the field. The NFL will have the option to hire additional officials for training and development and assign them to work NFL games.

The lockout was temporarily lifted by NFL commissioner Roger Goodell so that Gene Steratore's crew of regular officials could work the Thursday Night Football game between the Cleveland Browns and the Baltimore Ravens on September 27. In an open letter, Goodell told fans "you deserve better" than games being officiated by replacements. He regretted an agreement not being reached sooner and the "unfortunate distractions to the game".

The agreement was voted on by officials on September 28–29 in Dallas, Texas, and had to be ratified by 51 percent of the union's 121 members.

On September 29, 2012, it was announced that officials approved the new eight-year contract with the NFL on a 112–5 vote that officially ended the lockout. NFL officials and referees gathered in Irving, Texas then left straight to their game sites. Scott Green, president of the referees' association, said

It was pretty much 'Come on in and vote'.... We're going to talk football now. We're going to stop talking about CBAs and lockouts and now we're going to talk about rules and video and getting ourselves ready to work football games.

== Issues ==
The officials' union said that all of its demands amounted to a $3.2 million annual cost to the NFL, roughly four hundredths of a percent of the $9 billion in revenue generated by the league.

=== Retirement plan ===
The main issue behind the dispute was the retirement plan. Under the previous contract, NFL referees received a defined benefit plan, where retired workers would be guaranteed a fixed amount of income based on the length of their employment. The league wanted to switch to a defined contribution 401(k) plan, under which benefits would depend on the performance of the plan's investments, and would not be guaranteed.

The referees opposed this change, calling the 401(k) plan "inferior" because it would have reduced the league's funding obligation by 60%, while at the same time shifting additional investment risk to the employees. The referees said they would be willing to accept the change, as long as it only applied to new hires. The NFL initially rejected this stipulation, insisting that all referees switch to the new plan, but conceded to allowing current officials to retain their defined benefit plans until 2016.

=== Salaries ===
Under the previous labor agreement, referees were paid from a shared pool of $18 million per year, which works out to an average of about $149,000 per employee for each of the 121 referees (with the exact amount higher or lower depending on certain factors). The league claimed it was offering to increase average salaries from $149,000 to $189,000 by 2018, with average annual increases of between five and 11 percent. The referees disputed that claim, saying that the league's proposal actually only increases salaries by 2.82% per year.

=== Additional crews ===
The NFL currently employs 17 officiating "crews"—one for each of the 16 games played, plus one extra. The league wanted to hire three additional crews, bringing the total to 20 crews. The league claimed this would improve the quality of officiating, since they would have a larger pool of qualified officials to choose from, rewarding the best performing crews, and giving them more flexibility to "sideline" or "bench" poor performing ones. The union indicated that they believed the NFL was using the issue to distract from the core issues in the negotiations, due to the fact that the proposition was introduced so late in the negotiating process, and because a provision for adding officials already existed in the previous CBA. However, referees felt that making it easier to "bench" them undermined their job security, and since officials are paid based on the number of games worked, increasing the number of officials would invariably reduce the number of games worked per official, thereby reducing each official's average pay for a full season.

=== Full-time officials ===
The current group of officials are classified as part-time workers, with 90% of NFL referees holding other full-time jobs. The league wanted seven referees to work as full-time employees— one for each officiating position (referee, umpire, head linesman, etc.). The full-time officials would work with the league year-round on issues like safety, rule interpretations, training and scouting. The union was not opposed to this idea per se, but wanted assurances that full-time officials would be fairly compensated.

== Replacement officials ==
On June 4, 2012, the NFL began hiring replacement officials for the start of the 2012 season, most of whom were officials from high schools or lower college divisions. Some were from professional leagues such as the Arena Football League and the Legends Football League. However, following poor on-field performances, the Legends Football League issued a statement indicating that they had previously fired some of the replacement referees due to "incompetent officiating." Unlike the previous lockout in 2001, none of the replacements were Division I college officials. The NFL, in a memo detailing what it wanted in replacement referees, suggested that scouts target officials "who have recently retired from a successful career in College officiating and is still physically able to officiate at a high level of competency", or "lower division college officials, professional league officials and semi-professional league officials whose window of opportunity for advancement has pretty much closed but who have the ability to work higher levels but just got overlooked." Many Division I officials were effectively barred from serving as replacements, as current and former NFL officials serve as conference officiating supervisors, who would not have allowed their officials to cross the picket line. According to Mike Florio of Profootballtalk.com, "the more accurate explanation is that the Division I conferences refused to allow moonlighting in 2012."

=== Officiating incidents ===
Notable instances included:

==== Week 1 ====
Seahawks–Cardinals

In the fourth quarter of the Seattle Seahawks – Arizona Cardinals game, the officials incorrectly awarded an extra timeout to Seattle. Seahawks receiver Doug Baldwin was injured on a play with only 46 seconds left in the game. By rule, an injury that requires a stop in play in the final two minutes of the game requires that a timeout should be charged. The officials incorrectly did not charge the Seahawks their final timeout as they believed that if an injury happens while the clock is stopped that no timeout is charged. The error did not impact the result of the game, with the Cardinals winning 20–16.

==== Week 2 ====
Saints–Panthers

Hours before the start of the week 2 game between the New Orleans Saints and the Carolina Panthers, the league pulled replacement side judge Brian Stropolo after being notified that Stropolo's Facebook page showed he is a Saints fan.

Broncos–Falcons

Three plays were overturned in the game after replays. After a fumble in the first quarter, scuffles broke out between the two teams and the game was delayed for six minutes. Some players and coaches left the sidelines and yelled at the officials. Ray Edwards of the Atlanta Falcons bumped a referee, leading to a penalty but no ejection. Broncos head coach John Fox was fined $30,000 and defensive coordinator Jack Del Rio was fined $25,000 for verbal abuse of the officials.

==== Week 3 ====
49ers–Vikings

The San Francisco 49ers were mistakenly awarded two extra replay challenges in the fourth quarter of their 24–13 loss. San Francisco coach Jim Harbaugh challenged that the 49ers had recovered a fumble by the Minnesota Vikings' Toby Gerhart, which should have been denied since the team was out of timeouts. The call was overturned and the 49ers gained control of the ball and were given another timeout. They later challenged another fumble by Gerhart, but the play was upheld.

Lions–Titans

In overtime, Detroit Lions defender Stephen Tulloch received a 15-yard penalty for a helmet-to-helmet hit on the Tennessee Titans' Craig Stevens. Stevens' catch was reviewed and correctly overturned and ruled an incomplete pass, as the ball had hit the ground. However, the officials erred when they enforced the penalty on Tulloch from the Lions' 44 instead of Titans' 44, effectively increasing the penalty from 15 to 27 yards. On the same drive, Rob Bironas kicked a 26-yard field goal to win the game for the Titans.

Buccaneers–Cowboys

During the second quarter, Dallas Cowboys receiver Kevin Ogletree slipped on an official's hat in the end zone while he was trying to catch a pass from Tony Romo. The official in the end zone tossed his hat well into the field of play after another Cowboys receiver went out of bounds in the end zone.

Steelers–Raiders

No penalty was called against Steelers safety Ryan Mundy for a helmet-to-helmet hit on Raiders wide receiver Darrius Heyward-Bey. Heyward-Bey was knocked unconscious by the hit, got carted off the field, and spent the night in the hospital with a concussion and strained neck. The NFL later fined Mundy $21,000 for the hit.

Patriots–Ravens

In the fourth quarter, multiple penalties which were viewed by some as questionable went against the Ravens on subsequent plays. Head coach John Harbaugh was flagged for unsportsmanlike conduct for yelling at an official, although he claimed that he was trying to call a timeout. After this penalty, the crowd at M&T Bank Stadium began chanting the word "bullshit". The chant was sustained for over a minute and clearly audible (and uncensored) on the nationally televised Sunday Night Football broadcast; play-by-play commentator Al Michaels called it "the loudest manure chant I've ever heard".

On the final play of the game, Ravens kicker Justin Tucker hit a game-winning field goal that sailed over the right upright. The kick was ruled "good", giving the Ravens a 31–30 victory. On replay, the ball appeared to come "very close" to flying outside the right upright. Patriots head coach Bill Belichick unsuccessfully lobbied the officials to review the call, at one point grabbing the arm of one of the officials as they exited the field. Belichick was fined $50,000 by the NFL, which strictly forbids physical contact with officials. Belichick was apparently unaware that the play was unreviewable.

Packers–Seahawks

On the final play of the week 3 Monday Night Football game between the Green Bay Packers and the Seattle Seahawks, Seattle quarterback Russell Wilson threw a Hail Mary touchdown pass to wide receiver Golden Tate that officials ruled was simultaneously caught by Packers safety M. D. Jennings. Prior to the catch, Tate shoved a defender with both hands, which the NFL later acknowledged should have drawn an offensive pass interference penalty that would have negated the touchdown and resulted in a Packers victory.

The contentious nature of the replacement officials' decision at the end of this nationally televised game is widely considered to have been the tipping point that finally led to an agreement being reached to end the lockout. Goodell acknowledged that the game "may have pushed the parties further along" in negotiations.

== Reactions ==
=== NFL ===
During the preseason, NFL Commissioner Roger Goodell stated that he believed that the replacement officials would "do a credible job", while both Dallas Cowboys' owner Jerry Jones and Houston Texans' owner Bob McNair each said that they did not notice any difference in the officiating by the replacement officials. The league said it hoped to reduce any mistakes by having an alternate official on the sidelines at each game, who would be in constant communication with league supervisors, similar to what is normally done during playoff games.

During the lockout, four NFL coaches were fined by the league for disorderly conduct towards the replacement officials. On September 24, the league fined Denver Broncos coaches John Fox and Jack Del Rio for insulting the replacement officials, while fining New England Patriots head coach Bill Belichick for pulling a replacement official's arm and Washington Redskins assistant coach Kyle Shanahan for berating officials on September 26.

=== Players ===
Prior to the preseason, the NFL Players Association (NFLPA) expressed concern with the replacement officials, saying in a statement, "In 2011, the NFL tasked officials with increased responsibilities in protecting player health and safety, and its search for scabs undermines that important function. Professional athletes require professional referees, and we believe in the NFL Referees Association's trained first responders." Chicago Bears' center Roberto Garza told the Chicago Tribune that there is a familiarity with the regular referees on what they will and will not call, and so players "might be able to get away with more" when dealing with the replacement officials. After playing the first preseason game with the replacement officials, New York Giants' receiver Victor Cruz expressed his discomfort with the situation, saying, "I actually heard one of the refs, he'd only reffed glorified high school games which I don't even know what that means essentially." A Sporting News poll of 146 players made during the middle of preseason then found that 90.4 percent of them thought that games would be negatively impacted. Kevin Seifert of ESPN wrote that with the inexperienced replacement referees working the regular season, it is likely that games "will be impacted not by a judgment call—which happens every week of every season—but by an official who either doesn't know all of the NFL's rules or misapplies them."

After Week 2 of the regular season, the NFLPA sent a message to team owners urging them to end the lockout, making a reference to Goodell's power to fine players for illegal hits:

It is lost on us as to how you allow a Commissioner to cavalierly issue suspensions and fines in the name of player health and safety yet permit the wholesale removal of the officials that you trained and entrusted to maintain that very health and safety. It has been reported that the two sides are [now] apart by approximately $60,000 per team. We note that your Commissioner has fined an individual player as much in the name of "safety." Your actions are looking more and more like simple greed ... You cannot simply switch to a group of cheaper officials and fulfill your legal, moral, and duty obligations to us and our fans.

After the controversial ending of the week 3 Packers–Seahawks game, many players expressed their frustration with the replacement referees via Twitter. A tweet by Packers guard T. J. Lang—"Fuck it NFL.. Fine me and use the money to pay the regular refs."—was retweeted more than 98,000 times and, as of November 2012, was the third most retweeted of all time. Lang also raised the possibility of the players taking a knee on every play or engaging in a strike action against the league if the situation was not resolved. Lang was ultimately not fined for his comments.

=== Journalists ===
Mike Florio of Profootballtalk.com expressed a cynical opinion about the league's position after Week 1:

From the NFL's perspective, [the replacements' mistakes] doesn't matter. The replacement officials look the part, act the part, and sound the part. That's what the league was looking for when locating potential replacement officials. ... It's all about how the games look on TV. If the officials look and act the same, fans won't care. The league also has identified the perfect P.R. strategy for dealing with mistakes: "The regular officials make mistakes, too." ... So unless and until the replacements ... screw up—and if the mistake directly affects the outcome of a game—it will be hard for the locked-out officials to gain any leverage. Even then, it may not happen. The NFL has become very good at circling the wagons. The NFL will only alter its formation if/when arrows are being fired from inside the circle. And if the NFL successfully keeps a muzzle on its key personnel, we'll never even know that's happening.

Michael David Smith of Profootballtalk.com defended the replacements' performance after Week 1:

Plenty of people have complained about the replacement refs today after watching them make mistakes on Sunday, but it's important to remember that plenty of people complain about the regular refs after every NFL Sunday. ... There's no doubt that the replacement officials have made mistakes, but the regular officials make mistakes, too. ... Many of the fans and members of the media who have bashed the replacement officials have actually been wrong themselves and criticized the replacements for calls they got right. ... I only saw two officiating mistakes on Sunday that I felt confident the regular officials wouldn't have made. ... If the replacement officials made two more mistakes than the regular officials would have, that's two too many. But it's not the officiating debacle that some are making it out to be. I'd like to see the lockout end because I'd like to see the best officials on the field, but I'm not going to pretend the replacement officials are all a bunch of incompetent buffoons, because they're not. They're mostly doing solid work.

However, Smith was more critical after the Monday Night Football game during Week 2, saying that the replacement referees were "an embarrassment to Roger Goodell and the NFL owners, who are allowing underqualified and unprepared people to tarnish a great league."

One of the replacements was Shannon Eastin, the first female to ever officiate an NFL game, but writers such as Darin Gantt of Profootballtalk.com and Sam Farmer of the Los Angeles Times lamented the fact that she broke this gender barrier as one of the strikebreakers.

After the controversial ending to the week 3 Packers-Seahawks game, the NFL and the replacement officials were widely criticized. ESPN writer Mike Sando wrote:

... The final play was also highly questionable, obviously. And even though officials declared the game over and the field cleared, they eventually brought back the teams for a point-after try, without explanation. Ridiculous.

By Kevin Seifert:

In all, it was one of the most disorganized and embarrassing scenes you'll ever see on an NFL field. At least, so far.

After the game, ESPN Monday Night Football commentator Jon Gruden called the conclusion of the game "tragic" and "comical".

== See also ==
- 2001 NFL referee lockout
- 2011 NFL lockout
