= NHL lockout =

The NHL lockout may refer to any of the four industrial disputes in the history of the National Hockey League:

- The 1992 NHL strike, which postponed 30 games of the 1991–92 season
- The 1994–95 NHL lockout, which cancelled many of the games of the 1994–95 season, including the All-Star Game and shortened the regular season to 48 games per team with no inter-conference games
- The 2004–05 NHL lockout, which cancelled all of the games of the 2004–05 season
- The 2012–13 NHL lockout, which cancelled many of the games of the 2012–13 season, including the All-Star Game and shortened the regular season to 48 games per team with no inter-conference games

== See also ==
- MLB lockout
- MLS lockout
- NBA lockout
- NFL lockout
