= 2001 NFL referee lockout =

Labor dispute in American football

- Date: August 28, 2001 – September 19, 2001 (3 weeks and 1 day)
- Location: United States
- Caused by: Expiration of the 1994 NFL referee collective bargaining agreement after the 2000 NFL season; Failure to agree on a new agreement for referees ahead of the 2001 NFL season
- Result: Replacement referees hired on August 22 to work the remainder of the preseason with work continuing into the first two weeks of the regular season; Agreement reached to end lockout on September 17 after games were postponed due to the September 11 attacks; New collective bargaining agreement ratified on September 19

Parties
NFL Referees Association (NFLRA)	National Football League (NFL)

The 2001 NFL referee lockout was a labor dispute between the National Football League (NFL) and the NFL Referees Association (NFLRA) that resulted in the use of replacement officials through Week 1 of the 2001 NFL season. The lockout began in August 2001 after both sides failed to reach consensus on a collective bargaining agreement, which had expired upon the conclusion of the 2000 NFL season. It was the first time in the history of the league that replacement officials were used for regular season games. On September 19, 2001, an agreement was reached to end the lockout, which was precipitated by the September 11 attacks that had occurred the previous week and caused the postponement of all week 2 games.

== Timeline ==
In 1994, the National Football League Referees Association (NFLRA) and the National Football League (NFL) agreed to a collective bargaining agreement lasting through the 2000 season. However, following the expiration of the contract in March 2001, the two sides found themselves far apart in negotiations for a new deal. Several referees wished to boycott all training camps and mandatory league officiating clinics, but union leaders asked for no action to be taken as they sought to negotiate with the league. On August 13, 2001, NFL commissioner Paul Tagliabue stated that the two sides were far apart in negotiations and placed a 10-day time limit on getting a new contract signed before the league would pivot towards using replacement officials.

On August 22, 2001, the NFL began the process of hiring replacement referees by sending out over 100 contractional letters to officials in the Arena Football League, NFL Europe, and college football.

Following a breakdown in negotiations, the NFL officially locked out the officials on August 28 beginning with the last week of preseason games. Following more failed negotiations, it was announced on September 6 that the replacement officials would work the Week 1 games after the union rejected a revised offer from the league.

On September 10, 2001, replacement officials were informed that they would be working in Week 2 regardless of if the union and league came to an agreement or not.

=== Agreement ===
Following the September 11 attacks, the NFL cancelled all Week 2 games and rescheduled them to the weekend of January 6 and 7. Afterwards, the negotiations between the parties gained steam, with Bill Carollo, the executive director of the NFL Referees Association, negotiating directly with Pittsburgh Steelers owner Dan Rooney and council Jeff Pash. On September 17, 2001, the league and union agreed to a new 6-year contract, which would see the officials receive a 50% increase in salary with a 100% increase by year 4. On September 19, 2001, the union ratified the contract by a roughly 2-to-1 vote, officially ending the lockout.

== Issues ==
The primary sources of disagreement between the league and the NFL Referees Association pertained to the salaries, pensions, and severance for the officials. The NFL claimed that under their original proposal to the union, officials would receive a 40% increase in salary in the first year of the new agreement with a 120% increase by 2005, along with an increase in pay for preseason and postseason games. After the lockout was imposed, the league increased their offer to the union by offering a 60% increase in salary immediately with a 100% increase by 2003, but the union chose to reject it, leading the lockout to extend into the regular season. The lead negotiator for the union, agent Tom Condon, stated that the officials simply wished to be paid in line with what officials in the NBA, NHL, and MLB were making, while commissioner Tagliabue claimed that the officials were seeking a pay increase of four to five times what they were currently making as part-time officials, wherein the officials for the other major professional sports leagues work full time.

== Replacement officials ==
Prior to the first games played with replacement officials, the league chose not to reveal their identities until shortly before the scheduled kickoff. Many of the replacement officials used had experience officiating either in college football or in other professional leagues such as the Arena Football League and NFL Europe. According to Mike Pereira, then the director of officiating for the NFL, union members sent letters to prospective replacements telling them not to cross the picket line, but the letters had the reverse effect and many college officials chose to cross the picket line to spite the perceived arrogance of the union officials. Replacement officials were guaranteed $2,000 per game for four games, regardless of how many games they ended up working.

=== Bruce Smith incident ===
After a Week 1 loss to the San Diego Chargers, Washington Redskins defensive end Bruce Smith complained to reporters about replacement official Jim Sprenger, contending that Sprenger was failing to call obvious cases of holding and clipping. Smith stated that Sprenger had told him "You play and I ref. If you get hurt, you get hurt." Sprenger later resigned after Smith sent a letter to NFL commissioner Paul Tagliabue claiming that he had been punched, leg-whipped, and face-grabbed with no consequences given.
