= NBA lockout =

The NBA lockout may refer to any of the four lockouts in the history of the National Basketball Association:

- The 1995 NBA lockout, which lasted for three months before the 1995–96 season.
- The 1996 NBA lockout, which lasted for a couple of hours before the 1996–97 season.
- The 1998–99 NBA lockout, which lasted for more than six months and forced the 1998–99 season to be shortened to 50 regular season games per team and that season's All-Star Game to be canceled.
- The 2011 NBA lockout, which lasted for five months and forced the 2011–12 season to be shortened to 66 regular season games per team.

== See also ==
- MLB lockout
- MLS lockout
- NFL lockout
- NHL lockout
