= MLS Players Association =

Labor union of Major League Soccer players

MLSPA
- Founded: April 17, 2003
- Headquarters: 7500 Old Georgetown Road, Bethesda, Maryland
- Location(s): United States; Canada
- Key people: Bob Foose, Executive Director
- Affiliations: AFL–CIO; FIFPRO
- Website: mlsplayers.org

The Major League Soccer Players Association (MLSPA) is the union of professional Major League Soccer players. The MLS Players Association serves as the exclusive collective bargaining agreements representative for all current players in MLS.

== History ==
The MLS Players Association (formerly MLS Players Union) was formed in April 2003 after the conclusion of Fraser v. Major League Soccer. The founding members of the MLSPA Executive Board included Landon Donovan, Tim Howard, Chris Klein, Alexi Lalas, and Ben Olsen. Prior to the CBA, players received no form of retirement benefits, and many players lacked basic health insurance. On December 14, 2017, the MLS Players Union changed its name to the MLS Players Association and launched a full re-branding campaign.

== Collective bargaining agreements ==
=== First CBA (2005) ===
After negotiating with MLS in 2003 and 2004, on December 1, 2004, the Players Association and MLS signed the first-ever collective bargaining agreement (CBA) covering MLS players for the 2005 season to the 2009 season inclusively. Among other things, the CBA increased minimum salaries, established a 401(k) plan with guaranteed contributions from MLS, and guaranteed that all players and their families will be provided with 100% fully paid health insurance benefits. In addition, the CBA provides for an independent arbitrator to hear disputes between MLS and the players. MLS and the Players Association also negotiated a substance abuse policy covering all players in the league, as well as a Group License Agreement.

=== 2010 CBA ===
The collective bargaining agreement ran through the 2009 season and in January 2010 the Major League Soccer players threatened to go on strike. The union had voted in favor of a strike if a new deal was not reached before the beginning of the season. The labor agreement expired on January 31, 2010. Progress had been reported in negotiations with the Players Association, with the major issues reportedly player transfer and guaranteed contracts. The Players Association had accused MLS of failing to abide by international regulations set down by governing body FIFA, but the league denied the charge. FIFA said they would not intervene in a labor dispute. The MLSPA advised players to report to camp as planned. Reports had been conflicting about the actual possibility of a work stoppage. Both sides agreed to extend talks to February 12, and then extended then again to February 25, 2010.

On March 20, 2010, MLS and MLSPA signed a new 5-year agreement commencing with the 2010 season and continuing through January 31, 2015.

=== 2015 CBA ===
On March 4, 2015, the MLS and MLSPA agreed to terms on a third Collective Bargaining Agreement for a duration of 5 years.

- New restricted free agency.
- New free agency rules: Players need to be 28 years old and with at least 8 years of MLS experience.
- Number of players with guaranteed contracts increases.

=== 2020 CBA ===
On February 6, 2020, a new 5 year Collective Bargaining Agreement was struck between the MLS and the MLSPA.

- $1.9 billion investment in new deal.
- Expanded free agency rules: Players need to be 24 years old and with at least 5 years of MLS experience.
- Annual increase in mandatory charter flight for the players.
- 55 million in performance based bonuses.
- 55% increase in senior salaries.

MLS invoked a force majeure clause to reopen negotiations after the shortened 2020 season due to the COVID-19 pandemic. The new CBA was ratified on February 9, 2021, with an extension to January 31, 2028.
