= NFL Players Inc. =

National Football League Players Incorporated (NFL Players Inc.)
- Formation: May 1994
- Purpose: Licensing and marketing subsidiary of the NFL Players Association
- Headquarters: Washington, D.C., U.S.
- Key people: Matt Curtin, President
- Parent organization: National Football League Players Association

National Football League Players Incorporated (or NFL Players Inc.) is the licensing and marketing subsidiary of the National Football League Players Association. Formed in 1994, NFL Players Inc. facilitates the marketing of players as personalities as well as professional athletes. Notable partners include EA, Nike, and Pepsi.

== Background ==
NFL Players Inc. is the for-profit marketing and licensing arm of the NFL Players Association (NFLPA), the labor union representing professional football players in the National Football League (NFL). Founded in 1994, NFL Players Inc. manages the group licensing rights of more than 2,000 active players, facilitating partnerships between players and brands across a range of commercial platforms. The organization supports over 150 partners—including licensees, sponsors, and media platforms—operating across e-commerce, retail, digital, and direct-to-consumer channels. NFL Players Inc. generates player revenue through group licensing agreements, player activations, and brand collaborations.

NFL Players Inc. operates under the authority of the NFLPA, which has represented and advocated for the health, safety, and financial interests of its members since 1956.

NFL Players Inc. maintains an exclusive agreement with the National Football League that permits the league to utilize and sublicense group player rights to NFL sponsors. While active players retain the ability to pursue individual endorsement agreements, commercial deals involving six or more players are subject to NFL Players Inc.’s group licensing authority. The organization grants more than 65 consumer product licensees the rights to use players’ names, numbers, likenesses, and images across products such as trading cards, collectibles, video games, fantasy football platforms, apparel, and other retail and digital offerings. Royalty revenue generated through these agreements is distributed among participating players and the NFLPA.

=== Leadership ===
Pat Allen was the first chief operating officer and executive vice-president of NFL Players Inc. and she retired in October 2006; she was replaced by Andrew Feffer. Also in 2006, Doug Allen resigned as President of NFL Players Inc. to take the position of executive director of the Screen Actors Guild. Feffer resigned from NFL Players Inc. in 2009 and was replaced by Keith Gordon, who at the time was NFL Players Inc. vice president. As of 2013, Gordon continued to hold the position of NFL Players Inc. president. From 2015 to 2019, Ahmad Nassar was the president of the NFL Players Inc. Nassar previously served as the Executive Vice President of Business Affairs and General Counsel of the NFL Players, Inc. Following Nassar's departure in 2019 to serve as CEO of OneTeam Partners, Steve Scebelo was promoted to the role of president and held the position until 2024.

Matt Curtin was appointed as the current president of NFL Players Inc. in March 2024.

== History ==
=== 1990s ===
NFL Players Inc. was formed in May 1994 as a way to find and create marketing opportunities for current and past NFL players, and also grant licenses to use players' names, numbers, likenesses, and images.

In 1995, the National Football League Properties filed a trademark infringement lawsuit against NFL Players Inc. and Coors Brewing Company as a result of a planned marketing campaign that labeled Coors Beer as "The Official Beer of NFL Players". NFL Players Inc. countered that "NFL Players," was a natural abbreviation of their name, for which they owned the trademark. Although the court ruled in favor of the NFL, Coors was still able to run the campaign after changing a few point of purchase materials. In 1999, through a new partnership with Petty Enterprises, Petty's NASCAR racing team implemented a "Players Inc" themed paint scheme on the team's two cars that were competing in the Winston Cup.

=== 2000s ===
In 2000, Snickers was signed as a corporate sponsor of NFL Players Inc. The next year, the NFL and NFL Players Inc. entered a three-year, $6 million per year joint marketing agreement in which the NFL chose to allow league sponsors to use NFL players in their advertising and marketing campaigns, as well as share a percentage of all sponsorship revenue with the players. In exchange, the NFL was also given the ability to grant the rights for licensing and marketing deals involving six or more players, which was previously only possible through NFL Players Inc. Additionally, NFL Players Inc. began using some of the revenue received from the NFL to fund programs that support sponsors when they include athletes in appearances and endorsements.

As a result of the marketing agreement, NFL Players Inc. and the NFL created a nationwide, retail-based program aimed at increasing sales of NFL trading cards at hobby shops through promotions and sweepstakes. The next year, Reebok began licensing players names from NFL Players Inc. and became the NFL's official apparel provider. In an agreement signed in 2005, Electronic Arts (EA) was granted exclusive rights to develop, publish, and distribute video games using the names, images, numbers, and likenesses of active NFL players. At the time the deal took place, video games licensed by NFL Players Inc., such as Madden NFL, were the largest segment in the sports video game market, outselling basketball and baseball video games 4-to-1. In 2007, NFL Players Inc. was sued in a class-action lawsuit filed by Bernie Parrish and Herb Adderley on behalf of over 2,000 retired NFL players which claimed that NFL Players Inc. owed them back licensing fees. E-mails that surfaced during the discovery process showed that the NFLPA created lower-than-market-value deals for retired players as a favor to sponsors such as EA, leading to the jury awarding a total of $28 million in royalty fees to the retired players, $21 million of which was for punitive damages. Although the players union argued that only active players were covered by the agreements in question, as a gesture of goodwill to the retired players, NFLPA executive director DeMaurice Smith decided to not appeal the decision. In 2008, NFL Players Inc., alongside the NFL and Visa, created "Financial Football," an interactive video game for students to learn financial planning. The program was distributed to every public high school in Arizona. In March 2009, Yahoo!'s licensing agreements with NFL Players Inc. expired, leading to NFL Players Inc. insisting that Yahoo continue to pay royalties to use players' statistics, photos, and other information for the site's fantasy football game. Yahoo! argued that because the information being used was already available to the public, there was no need for authorization. The NFLPA and Yahoo! were able to reach a settlement, and the lawsuit was dismissed.

=== 2010s ===
In 2010, NFL Players Inc. entered a licensing agreement with Nashville-based startup SchooloftheLegends.com (SOTL). SOTL created a training videos site to connect players with their fans and provide online tips for members of the youth league. The next year, NFL Players Inc. launched a licensing website with Playmark in order to create a simplified way for merchandise and software company's to acquire the rights of NFL players from NFL Players Inc. Playmark, a Seattle-based start-up funded in part by NFL Players Inc., created the first sport-based software that allowed licensors to utilize an online process to secure the rights of players. The One Team Shop, originally the NFLPA Shop, was launched by NFL Players Inc. as an e-commerce site in July 2012 to sell merchandise for current players.

=== 2020s ===
As of 2025, NFL Players Inc. manages more than 67 licensing partners and 46 sponsors. The organization has reported approximately $2.9 billion in annual retail sales of products licensed by the NFL Players Association.

Some notable collaborations during the decade include partnerships that expanded licensed products into new cultural and lifestyle categories. The NFL Players Association partnered with A. J. Brown and Peace Collective on a first-of-its-kind collaboration focused on mental health advocacy. New Era collaborated with the NFLPA on campaigns that connected player identity, fashion, and community engagement. Additionally, the NFLPA partnered with Bocce's Bakery to launch the first officially licensed NFL player dog treats.

== Events and media ==
NFL Players Inc. has also had a large role in creating events marketing NFL Players, including some on television and radio. In 1995, they were involved in the creation of the annual NFLPA Rookie Premiere, a multi-day event where new members of the league have their first trading card photo shoots, learn about their union and NFL Players Inc.'s initiatives, and are given advice on life as a rookie. The Rookie Premiere gives the new players an opportunity to hear about specific issues such as financial and career planning, and the expectations for media and public appearances. Players are also given the opportunity to meet and interact with NFL Players Inc. partners and licensees, such as Pepsi, Nike, and trading card companies Topps and Panini.

NFL Players Inc. started "Stay Cool in School" in 1997. The education-based community outreach program served as a way to reach out to elementary aged children in Super Bowl host cities. After a preliminary academic, behavior and attendance evaluation, eligible students are invited to write an essay, from which a few are picked to host NFL players in their classrooms. The program continued through the 2010 Super Bowl.

In 2001, NFL Players Inc. created an event called "Unsung Heroes," which highlighted players charitable work. The event was aired on television and later became known as the JB Awards. NFL Players Inc. also co-produced "Helmets Off" for many years on Fox Sports, highlighting different players during the offseason and the NFL season. NFL Players Inc. was also responsible for providing players for the annual Wheel of Fortune: NFL Players Week.

The company also produced "Players Inc Radio", originally heard on CBS Radio. In 2010, the program moved to Fox Radio, and Daryl Johnston became a host.
