= JC Tretter =

American football player and trade unionist (born 1991)

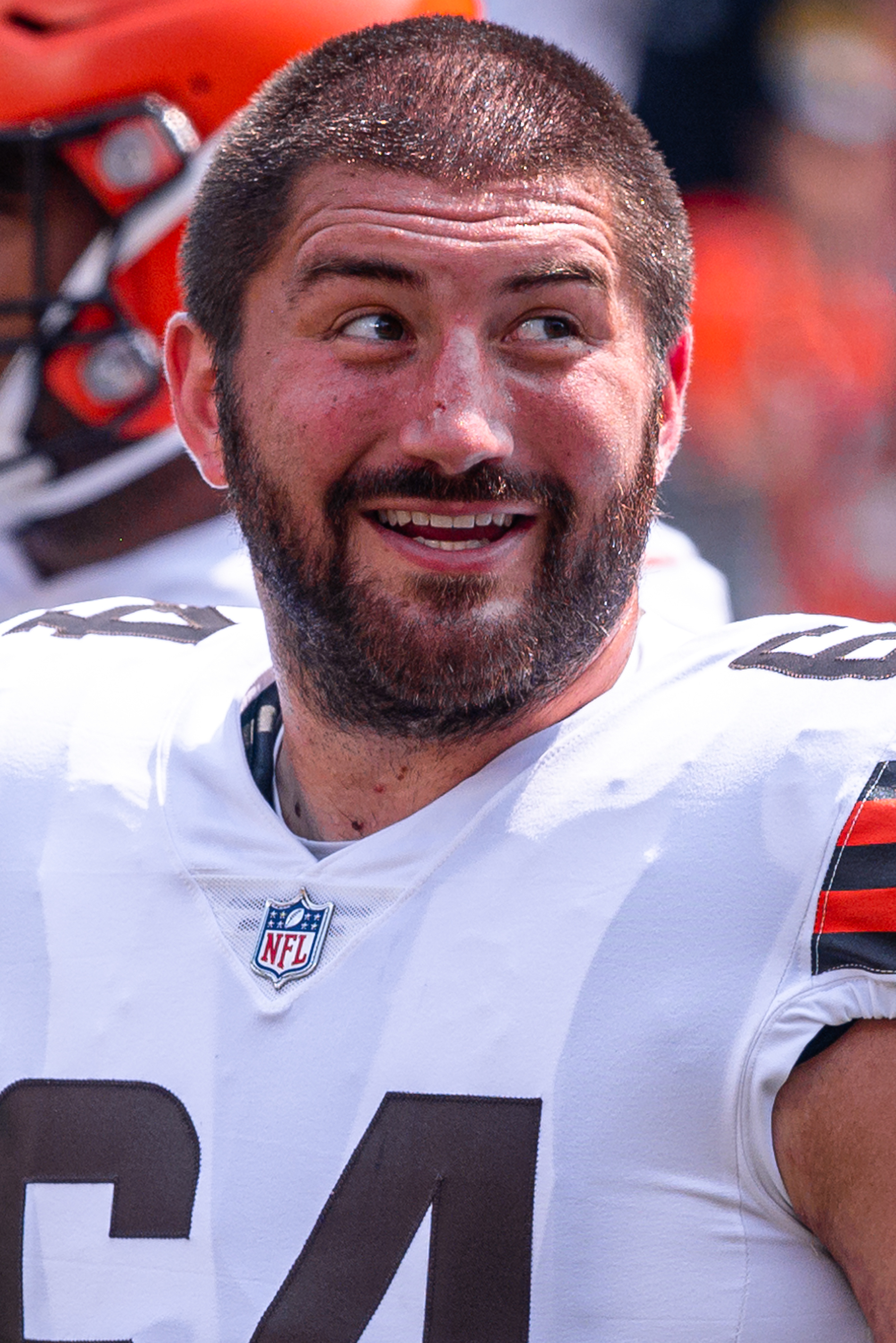
- Tretter with the Cleveland Browns in 2021

No. 73, 64
- Position: Center

Personal information
- Born: February 12, 1991 (age 35); Batavia, New York, U.S.
- Listed height: 6 ft 4 in (1.93 m)
- Listed weight: 307 lb (139 kg)

Career information
- High school: Akron Central (Akron, New York)
- College: Cornell (2009–2012)
- NFL draft: 2013: 4th round, 122nd overall pick

Career history
- Green Bay Packers (2013–2016); Cleveland Browns (2017–2021)

Awards and highlights
- First-team All-Ivy (2012); Third-team FCS All-American (2012)

Career NFL statistics
- Games played: 111
- Games started: 90
- Stats at Pro Football Reference

Joseph Carl "JC" Tretter Jr. (born February 12, 1991) is an American former professional football player who was a center in the National Football League (NFL) and executive director of the NFL Players Association (NFLPA) since 2026. Tretter played college football for the Cornell Big Red and was selected by the Green Bay Packers in the fourth round of the 2013 NFL draft. He later played for the Cleveland Browns from 2017 to 2021.

== Early life ==
Tretter was born in Batavia, New York, the son of Joseph and Cynthia Tretter. He attended Akron Central High School, where he was a standout athlete for the Akron Central Tigers football and basketball teams. He was a three-year starter on offense and defense for the Tigers in football, a team captain as a junior and senior, and was a second-team Class C all-state selection as a senior. In basketball, he was a four-year starter for the Tigers and a three-time first-team all-league selection, and graduated as the team's all-time leading scorer and rebounder.

== College career ==
Tretter attended Cornell University, where he played for the Cornell Big Red football team from 2009 to 2012. After playing tight end during his first two seasons, he switched to the offensive tackle position for his final two years. He was credited with the significantly improved pass protection given to Cornell's quarterback in 2011 and 2012. Following his senior season in 2012, he was a unanimous first-team All-Ivy League selection. He also received third-team All-American honors (FCS) from Beyond Sports College Network and The Sports Network.

At Cornell, Tretter studied in the School of Industrial Labor Relations. His sister, Katie, and three of his uncles all attended Cornell. His uncle, David Tretter, played football for Cornell during the mid-1970s.

== Professional career ==
External videos
- J.C. Tretter's NFL Combine workout

Pre-draft measurables
Height	Weight	Arm length	Hand span	Wingspan	40-yard dash	10-yard split	20-yard split	20-yard shuttle	Three-cone drill	Vertical jump	Broad jump	Bench press	Wonderlic
6 ft 3 5/8 in (1.92 m)	307 lb (139 kg)	33 3/8 in (0.85 m)	10 1/8 in (0.26 m)	6 ft 6 1/8 in (1.98 m)	5.09 s	1.75 s	2.94 s	4.69 s	7.48 s	29.5 in (0.75 m)	9 ft 1 in (2.77 m)	29 reps	33
All values from NFL Combine

=== Green Bay Packers ===
The Green Bay Packers selected Tretter in the fourth round (122nd overall) of the 2013 NFL draft. He was the ninth offensive tackle selected and was the second offensive tackle drafted by the Green Bay Packers, behind fourth round pick David Bakhtiari (109th overall).

On May 10, 2013, the Green Bay Packers signed Tretter to a four-year, $2.57 million contract that includes a signing bonus of $415,908. Tretter was placed on reserve/physically unable to perform on August 27, 2013. On December 10, 2013, he was activated from the physically unable to perform list.

On September 3, 2014, Tretter was placed on injured reserve – designated for return. He was activated from injured reserve – designated for return on November 3, 2014.

In 2016, Tretter started seven games for the Packers before going down with a knee injury in Week 7. He was inactive for the rest of the games in the regular season before having surgery on January 17, 2017. He was placed on injured reserve on January 21, 2017, a day before the NFC Championship matchup against the Atlanta Falcons.

=== Cleveland Browns ===
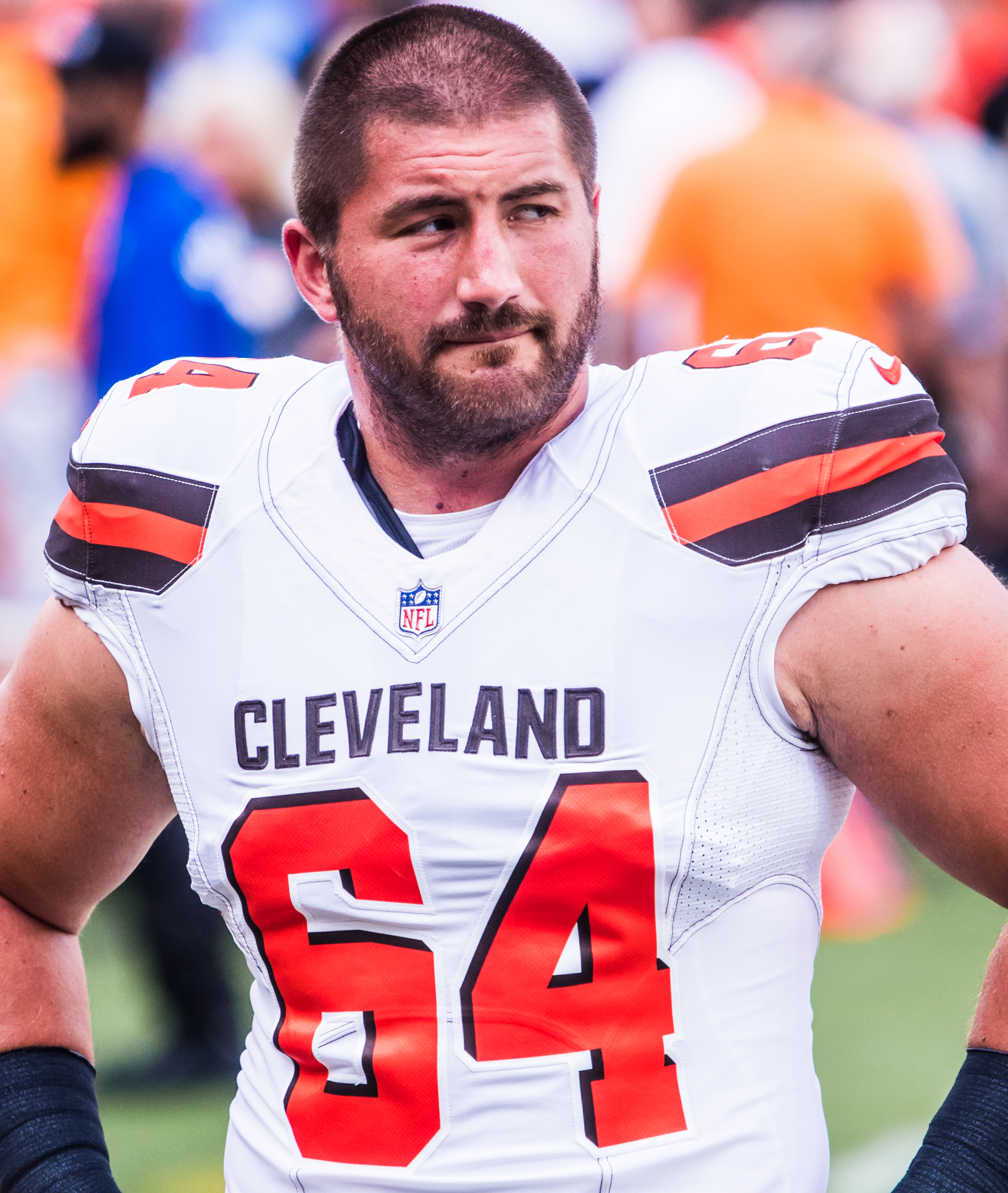
Tretter playing for the Browns in 2018.

On March 9, 2017, the Cleveland Browns signed Tretter to a three-year, $16.75 million contract that includes $6.50 million guaranteed and a signing bonus of $4.50 million. In his first season in Cleveland, he started all 16 games at center.

On November 7, 2019, Tretter signed a three-year, $32.5 million contract extension with the Browns, keeping him under contract through the 2022 season. Tretter was released by the Browns on March 15, 2022.

On August 25, 2022, Tretter announced his retirement from the NFL.

=== Work at the NFLPA ===
Having studied labor relations at Cornell University, Tretter was elected President of the NFL Players Association on March 10, 2020, succeeding Eric Winston. He played a role in negotiations surrounding the 2020–2030 collective bargaining agreement, which was ultimately agreed to five days after he became president of the NFLPA.

Tretter was named co-chair of the NFLPA's COVID committee ahead of the 2020 NFL season. He represented players in negotiations that created new health and safety protocols, resulting in an average league positivity rate of 0.076% and enabling all 256 regular-season games being able to be played with no cancellations.

In March 2022, Tretter was re-elected for a second term as NFLPA president. Due to his retirement as a player, he was ineligible for re-election in 2024. Starting in October, 2024, he served as NFLPA chief strategy officer, though resigned less than a year later, due in part to his and NFLPA executive directory Lloyd Howell's management of the collusion scandal surrounding Deshaun Watson's fully guaranteed contract.

== Personal life ==
Tretter married Anna Tretter in February 2020.

On March 17, 2026, Tretter was elected to serve as the new executive director for the NFL Players Association.
