= Eric Winston =

American football player (born 1983)

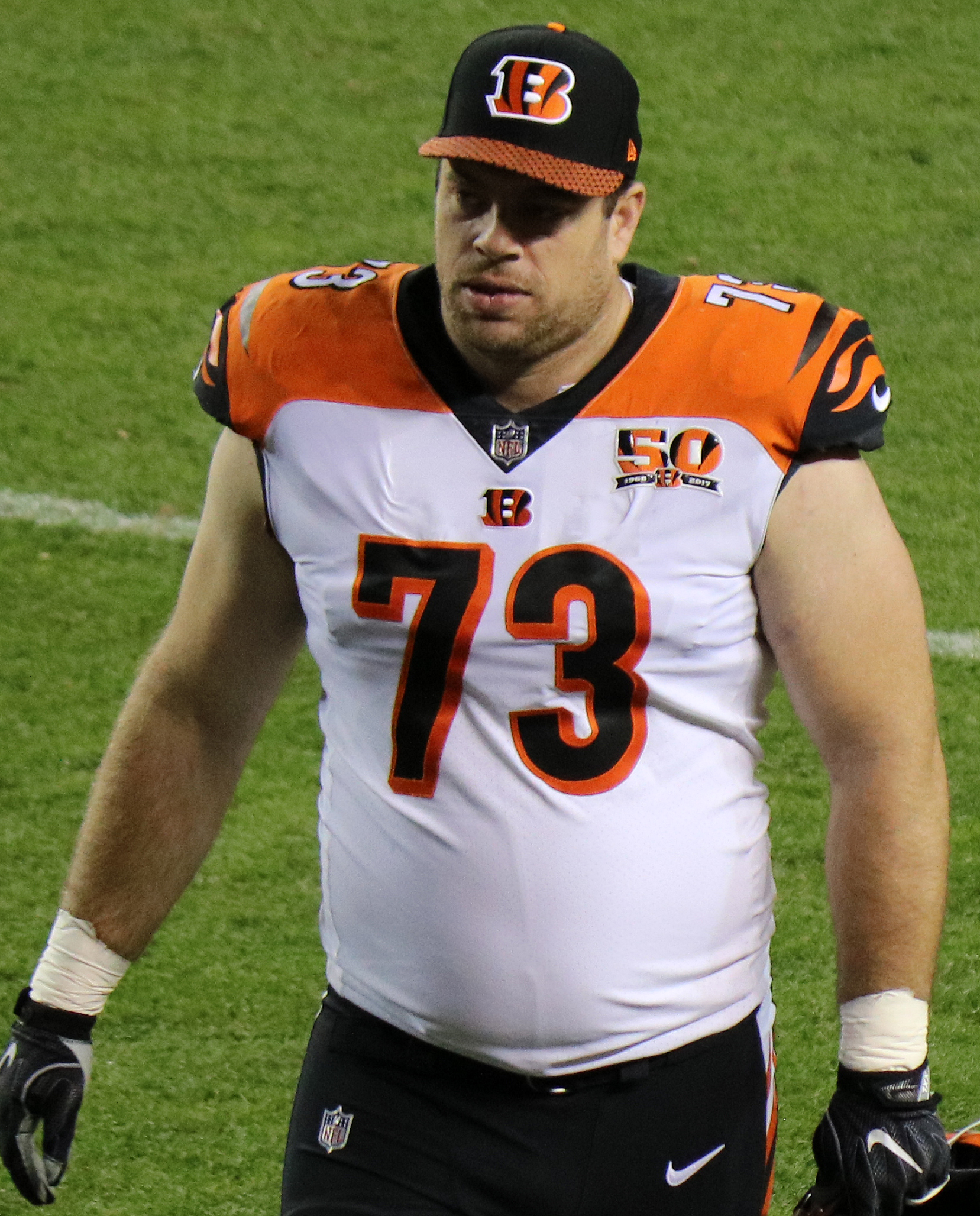
- Winston with the Cincinnati Bengals in 2017

No. 73, 74
- Position: Offensive tackle

Personal information
- Born: November 17, 1983 (age 43); Midland, Texas, U.S.
- Listed height: 6 ft 7 in (2.01 m)
- Listed weight: 310 lb (141 kg)

Career information
- High school: Lee (Midland)
- College: Miami (FL)
- NFL draft: 2006: 3rd round, 66th overall pick

Career history
- Houston Texans (2006–2011); Kansas City Chiefs (2012); Arizona Cardinals (2013); Seattle Seahawks (2014)*; Cincinnati Bengals (2014–2017)
- * Offseason or practice squad member only

Awards and highlights
- BCS national champion (2001); First-team All-American (2005); First-team All-ACC (2005)

Career NFL statistics
- Games played: 165
- Games started: 127
- Stats at Pro Football Reference

Eric Joseph Winston (born November 17, 1983) is an American former professional football player who was an offensive tackle in the National Football League (NFL). He played college football for the Miami Hurricanes and was selected by the Houston Texans in the third round of the 2006 NFL draft. Winston also played for the Kansas City Chiefs, Arizona Cardinals, and Cincinnati Bengals. He was the president of the National Football League Players Association (NFLPA) from 2014 to 2020.

== Early life ==
Winston played high school football at Robert E. Lee High School in Midland, Texas, where he was ranked amongst the most talented high school tight ends in the country. He played alongside fellow NFL running back Cedric Benson, and the two helped the Rebels win three straight Texas 5A state championships.

== College career ==
Winston chose to attend college at the University of Miami after being heavily recruited by several other schools. He majored in International Finance and Marketing and played offensive tackle. He initially was set to play tight end for the Hurricanes, but made the switch before his sophomore year. Winston was widely considered one of the best offensive tackles to enter the 2006 NFL draft. However, an anterior cruciate ligament injury during his junior year made his draft stock drop, and several draft scouting organizations expressed slight worry over the possible implications of the injury and subsequent surgery on his play.

Winston was also a standout student, graduating in three years with a GPA above 3.5, and he was a 2005 All-America selection. He was a member of the Pi Kappa Alpha fraternity.

== Professional career ==
Pre-draft measurables
Height	Weight	Arm length	Hand span	40-yard dash	10-yard split	20-yard split	20-yard shuttle	Three-cone drill	Vertical jump	Broad jump	Bench press
6 ft 6 5/8 in (2.00 m)	310 lb (141 kg)	32 1/4 in (0.82 m)	9 1/4 in (0.23 m)	4.96 s	1.67 s	2.82 s	4.44 s	7.47 s	29.0 in (0.74 m)	9 ft 0 in (2.74 m)	22 reps
All values from NFL Combine, except bench from Pro Day

=== Houston Texans ===
Winston was selected in the third round of the 2006 NFL draft with the 66th overall pick. He started the final seven games as a rookie at right tackle in 2006 and proceeded to start 87 games for them until 2011. He signed a contract extension prior to the 2008 season. The Texans released him on March 12, 2012.

=== Kansas City Chiefs ===
Winston signed with the Kansas City Chiefs on March 17, 2012. On October 7, 2012, Winston spoke out about Kansas City Chiefs fans, who he thought were cheering an injury to quarterback Matt Cassel. No video evidence has ever been produced to support Winston's claim. In a post game interview, he claimed "this isn't the Roman Colosseum" and "it is hard economic times". He mentioned that he came to the understanding he probably won't live as long because he plays this game, but cheering over a player getting knocked out is "100% sickening". He was released by the Chiefs on March 7, 2013.

=== Arizona Cardinals ===
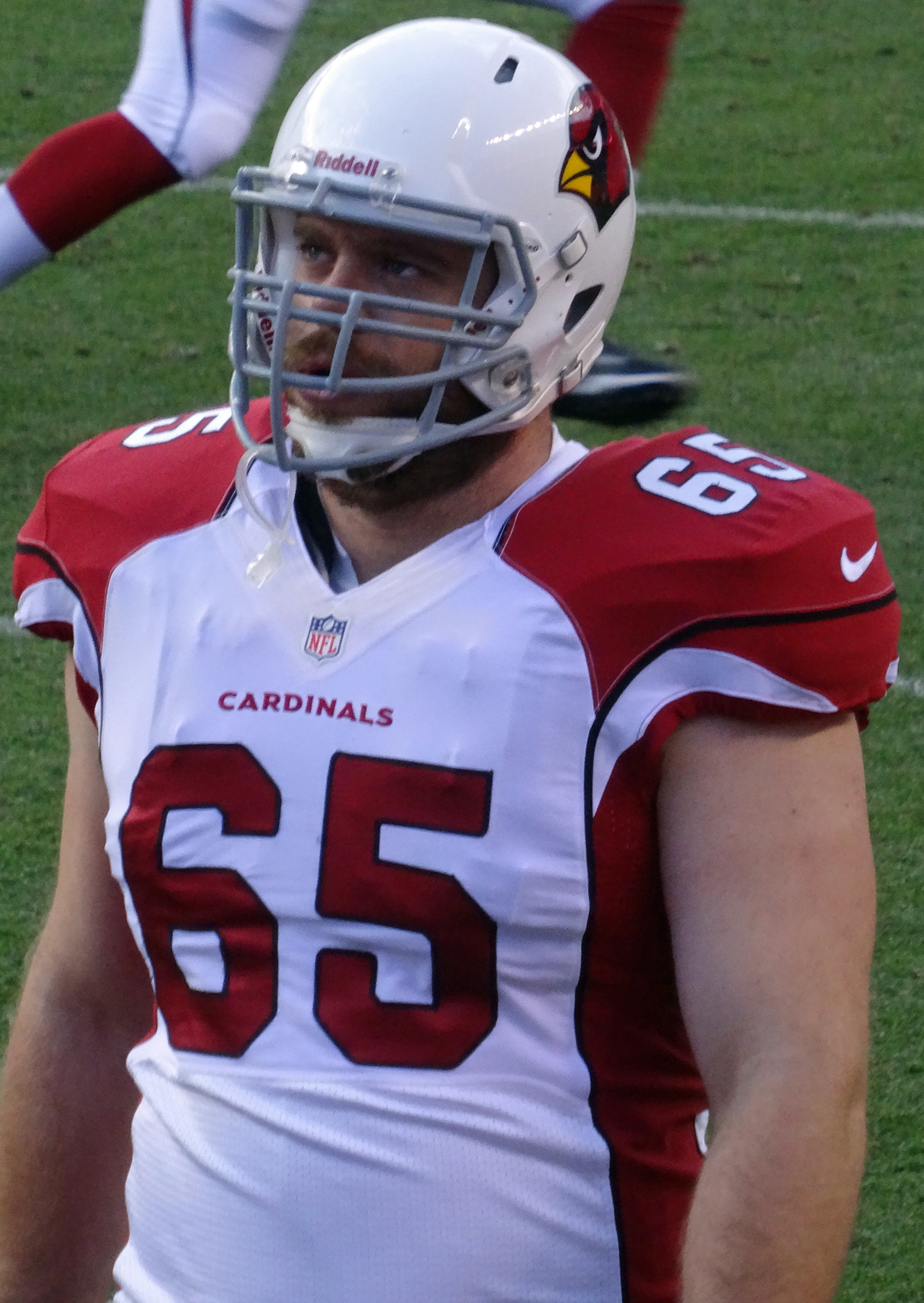
Winston with the Arizona Cardinals in 2013

Winston signed a one-year contract with the Arizona Cardinals on July 25, 2013.

=== Seattle Seahawks ===
Winston signed a one-year contract with the Seattle Seahawks on July 29, 2014. Winston failed to make the final 53-man roster, and was released on August 30, 2014.

=== Cincinnati Bengals ===
Winston signed a one-year contract with the Cincinnati Bengals on December 2, 2014.

On March 9, 2016, the Bengals re-signed Winston to a one-year, $1.09 million contract.

On March 10, 2017, the Bengals re-signed Winston to his third consecutive one-year contract. He was released on September 2, 2017. He was re-signed by the Bengals on November 8, 2017.

=== NFL Players Association ===
In March 2014, Winston was elected president of the National Football League Players Association (NFLPA), succeeding Domonique Foxworth. Prior to being elected president, Winston had been involved with the NFLPA in other capacities, including being elected as a co-alternate NFLPA representative for the Houston Texans in 2010 and serving on committees for agent discipline and finance. He was also vocal during the 2011 NFL lockout. Winston has stated that his first priorities for his presidency will be player health and safety, financial literacy, and workplace conditions, especially in the locker room. He was succeeded by J. C. Tretter in March 2020.

== Personal life ==
Winston is married, and has three daughters and one son. He also does volunteer work for the Shriners Hospitals for Children.
