= Richard Berthelsen =

American lawyer and labor leader (born 1944)

Richard A. Berthelsen (born September 14, 1944) is a former interim executive director of the NFL Players Association. Berthelsen assumed the role after the death of Gene Upshaw on August 21, 2008, and left the office on March 16, 2009, when DeMaurice Smith was named as Upshaw's successor. Before becoming interim executive director, Berthelsen had worked for the NFL Players Association since 1972 as a legal counsel and principal assistant.
