= 2011 NFL lockout =

National Football League work stoppage

- Date: March 12, 2011 – July 25, 2011 (4 months, 1 week and 6 days)
- Location: United States
- Caused by: 1993 NFL Collective Bargaining Agreement opt-out clause invoked in May 2008; 2010 season played without the salary cap in force; Failure to reach a new collective bargaining agreement ahead of the 2011 NFL draft; Disagreements between league owners and players on rule changes for the 2011 NFL season; Antitrust litigation between players and owners
- Goals: Owners proposed expansion of the regular season from 16 to 18 games, implementation of rookie wage scale, salary cap reform, and reduction of players' share of the league's revenue; Players counter-proposed with increase in their share of the league's revenue, along with provisions for new health and safety protocols
- Result: New 10-year collective bargaining agreement reached with no changes to the length of the regular season; 2011 NFL season proceeds as planned: Pro Football Hall of Fame Game canceled on July 21; Anti-trust litigation resolved between July 21 and July 25; Collective bargaining agreement took effect on August 4; Referees locked out in June 2012

Parties
National Football League Players Association (NFLPA)	National Football League (NFL)

Lead figures
DeMaurice Smith (executive director); Kevin Mawae (president); Tom Brady; Peyton Manning; Drew Brees	Roger Goodell (commissioner); Robert Kraft (lead negotiator)

The 2011 NFL lockout was a work stoppage imposed by the owners of the NFL's 32 teams that lasted from March 12, 2011, to July 25, 2011. When the owners and the NFL players, represented by the National Football League Players Association, could not come to a consensus on a new collective bargaining agreement (CBA), the owners locked out the players from team facilities and shut down league operations. The major issues disputed were the salary cap, players' safety and health benefits, revenue sharing and television contracts, transparency of financial information, rookie salaries, season length, and free agency guidelines. During the 18-week, 4-day period, there was no free agency or training camp, and players were restricted from seeing team doctors, entering or working out at team facilities, or communicating with coaches. The end of the lockout coincided with the formation of a new collective bargaining agreement prior to the start of the 2011 regular season.

== Background ==
In 1992, the National Football League (NFL) and the National Football League Players Association (NFLPA) came to terms on a collective bargaining agreement. This agreement was renewed four times. In May 2008, the owners decided to opt out of the 1993 arrangement and play the 2010 season without a salary cap due to the 2010 season being the last year of the CBA. That last labor agreement gave players 57 percent of the league's $8 billion in revenue, after the owners took more than $1 billion for operating and development costs of the league. A major reason the owners opted out of the CBA early was that they wanted a larger percentage of league revenue. Part of the previous CBA involved a transfer of revenues from the higher earning teams to the lowest, even though some of the higher earners also had higher costs. The players, represented as the National Football League Players Association, were very skeptical that the owners were losing money as a result of their payments to players, and believed the labor dispute was deliberately generated by some owners in order to renegotiate their own revenue sharing agreements which are attached to the CBA. The players resisted any pay cuts across the board.

The major changes the owners wanted implemented in the next agreement were to significantly reduce the players' percentage of revenue, to extend the regular season from 16 to 18 games, and establish a rookie wage scale and/or rookie salary cap that would limit first-round draft pick compensation. The players wanted guaranteed a higher percentage of league-wide spending and cash spend by every team per the salary cap on players, more benefits for former players, and changes made to improve health and safety including offseason and in-season training.

Anticipating an owner-imposed lockout, players on every team voted unanimously in Fall 2010 to agree to renounce collective bargaining rights if a CBA extension could not be reached prior to expiration of the current CBA. Renunciation of CBA rights would expose the owners to potential antitrust lawsuits. The players would then lose the ability to collectively bargain with the owners. The league is exempt from most facets of antitrust laws as a result of Public Law 89-800, passed in the wake of the AFL–NFL merger in 1970, thus complicating any potential lawsuit against the league. The NFL hired firms to lobby members of the U.S. Congress on their behalf, and the NFL's political action committee, Gridiron PAC, made several large donations to lawmakers who oversee the league in numerous capacities, as well as several other influential lawmakers. The players union also hired firms to lobby members of the U.S. Congress on their behalf, claiming that a lockout could potentially cost each NFL city $160 million in lost business, based on a study by consulting firm Edgeworth Economics. Congressmen also indicated a willingness to intervene if necessary.

The NFL had negotiated contracts with television networks to provide over $4 billion in 2011 to the NFL even if the owners shut down the league and no games were played in 2011. On March 1, 2011, judge David S. Doty ruled that the NFL had been actively strategizing for a lockout of the players for more than two years. It was determined that the purpose of the NFL's deliberate actions were to "advance its own interests and harm the interests of the players."

== Lockout ==
=== Renunciation of CBA rights ===
Following the end of the 2010 season, the players and owners had not resolved the labor dispute. Although the CBA was set to expire on March 3, the players and the league owners agreed to extend the negotiations by one week, changing the expiration date to March 11, 2011. After a one-week extension, negotiations failed to result in a new agreement. At midnight on March 11, the CBA expired and the owners imposed a lockout. Accordingly, the NFLPA informed the league and the clubs that the players had voted to have the NFLPA renounce its bargaining rights. After the renunciation of collective bargaining rights, quarterbacks Tom Brady, Peyton Manning, and Drew Brees joined seven other NFL players and filed an antitrust suit to enjoin the lockout.

=== Court rulings ===
On April 25, 2011, U.S. District Court judge Susan Richard Nelson invalidated the lockout and ordered the league to resume operations. The league asked Nelson to stay the order while it appeals to the Eighth Circuit Court of Appeals; Nelson refused. The NFLPA had advised players to arrive at their teams' stadiums for work uninvited; most teams allowed players to enter the front office but refused further access. The order to resume operations without any CBA in place left the league in "chaos" because, without a CBA, there were no rules in place regarding a salary cap or floor, free agency, and similar labor-related issues. On April 29, 2011, the Eighth Circuit Court of Appeals granted the league a temporary stay of Nelson's ruling; the league reinstated the lockout following Day 2 of the draft. The stay was extended through at least June 3, when a full appeal was heard; the Eighth Circuit vacated Nelson's ruling on July 8, affirming the legitimacy of the lockout, but also suggested that Judge Nelson could impose an injunction of the lockout as it relates to players not under contract such as free agents and rookies.

=== Contingency plans ===
A provision in the CBA ensured that the 2011 NFL draft was allowed to take place despite the lockout. In addition, there was also some cushion in the 2011 schedule just in case the labor dispute lasted into September and the planned start of the regular season. NFL Commissioner Roger Goodell stated that Super Bowl XLVI could be moved a week later if needed, so that the entire season could be played in full. In addition, every contest in Week 3 had teams that shared the same bye week later in the season, which would have allowed these games to be made up on what was originally the teams' byes. Weeks 2 and 4 were set up so that there are neither any divisional rivalry games nor teams on bye in those weeks, which would have kept the season as fair as possible if those games had to be canceled. The league could also eliminate the normal off week between the conference championship games and the Super Bowl, as well as move the Super Bowl back a week. Up to five weeks of the season could have been lost (moving week 3 games into the bye weeks, canceling weeks 2 and 4, and moving weeks 1 and 5 to the end of the season, while postponing the start of the playoffs two weeks, and moving the Super Bowl back a week and having no week off between the conference championship games and Super Bowl) while still keeping a generally fair fourteen-game schedule with six division games and eight non-division games. The league also had a plan for a longer lockout, which included an abbreviated eight-game season beginning in late November. Goodell had also stated that the league did not consider using replacement players.

=== Other litigation ===
On March 28, 2011, four former NFL players, including Hall of Fame defensive end Carl Eller, sued the NFL in hopes of joining current players in their antitrust fight against the league. The 44-page complaint filed in federal court in Minneapolis sought class-action status on behalf of all former players. The retirees wanted the NFL lockout lifted to ensure their pensions and health benefits remained funded. According to the lawsuit, those benefits would end if a collective bargaining agreement was not renewed by next March 11, a year after the last one expired.

On July 5, 2011, a group of retired NFL players led by Carl Eller, Franco Harris, Marcus Allen and Paul Krause filed its own class-action lawsuit against both the NFL and NFLPA, stating that the renunciation of CBA rights disqualified the NFLPA from bargaining on the former NFL players' behalf.

== End of lockout ==
These NFL owners announced on July 21, 2011 that they had approved a settlement of the players' antitrust litigation by a 31–0–1 margin (the Oakland Raiders abstained), but the players decided not to vote on the settlement because they did not approve all of the terms outlined in the proposal. After continued negotiations, the ten players named as plaintiffs in the Brady case approved the settlement on July 25, and the agreement became effective after ratification by a majority of the players in the NFL on August 4, 2011. Although the settlement was approved on July 25, the NFL didn't officially recognize the NFLPA’s status as the players’ collective bargaining representative until July 30, 2011. When NFL Commissioner Roger Goodell and NFLPA Executive Director DeMaurice Smith signed the agreement, the lockout officially ended.

=== New CBA ===
ESPN writer John Clayton notes that there were five major parts of the new CBA: free agency, salary cap, rookie compensation, minimum salaries, and franchise tags. First, free agency guidelines returned to the way they were from 1993 to 2011. This means that a player needs four years of experience to become an unrestricted free agent, and three years of experience for restricted free agency. Second, the salary cap is now $120.375 million, but unlike the previous CBA, the new one initially has no per-team salary minimum. Team salary floors would not return until the 2013 season, at which time they became 89% of the cap. For the 2011 season, teams had the ability to "borrow" $3 million in future salary cap space to use on a signed player. For the years following the 2011 season, teams have the option of "borrowing" $1.5 million each for up to three players. Third, the rookie compensation was altered. There is a limit to the amount of money given to rookies, with the maximum total in 2011 being $874 million. First round picks receive four-year deals, with a fifth year option. In the second through seventh rounds, there are slotted four-year deals. Fourth, the league minimum salary for players increased by 10–12 percent, based on tenure. Fifth, a team's ability to place a franchise or transition tag on top players to retain his rights did not change. Other major concerns included health and safety of players, as well as former player benefits and pensions. The new 10-year collective bargaining agreement ran through 2021, and had an estimated value of $12–$16 billion per year.

=== Players' takeaways ===
The players won $1 billion in additional benefits for retired players, an opportunity to stay in the players' medical plan for life, increased minimum salaries, the continuation of a 16-game regular season schedule, improvements in player safety, increased injury protection, unrestricted free agency after four years, a true salary floor, and increased roster size. Some of the major player safety improvements included five fewer weeks of organized off-season practice, limited on-field practice time, limited full-contact practices, elimination of two-a-day practices in pads, and an increase in the number of days off of work. The players also prevented the owners from knocking them down to 42 percent of league revenues, with a decreasing percentage each year. Starting in 2012, the players also won 55 percent of national media revenue, 45 percent of all NFL Ventures revenue, and 40 percent of local club revenue.

=== Owners' takeaways ===
The owners won franchise and transition tags, not having to pay $320 million in benefits for an uncapped year, no judicial oversight in disputes between players and owners, settlement of all pending litigation, a rookie wage system, full regular season game revenue, more equitable revenue sharing and supplemental revenue sharing, no opt out clause for players for 10 years (though the owners cannot opt out, either), and credit for stadium investments with up to 1.5 percent of revenue each year. The league also cited the new CBA as a key factor in being able to negotiate long-term extensions in their television contracts, which were renewed a few months after the CBA was finalized and include minimum 50% increases in rights fees across all television partners.

The owners were unable to get an additional $1 billion off the top of all revenue, an 18-game season, and rights of first refusal for the 2011 unrestricted free agents.

=== Hall of Fame Game ===
The two teams (Chicago Bears and St. Louis Rams) involved in the Pro Football Hall of Fame Game had set a deadline of July 22, 2011, for both sides to ratify a deal in time for training camp to be opened and the game to be played (under normal circumstances, each team opens training camp 15 days before their first preseason game). When that day passed without both sides agreeing to a deal, the league canceled the game. The Pro Football Hall of Fame Game was the only on-field cancellation of the lockout.

== See also ==
- 2004–05 NHL lockout
- 2011 NBA lockout
- 2012 NFL referee lockout
