= Rookie =

Person new to a profession

A rookie is a person new to an occupation, profession, or hobby. In sports, a rookie is a professional athlete in their first season (or year).

In contrast with a veteran, who has experience, a rookie is typically considered needing more training and learning, though they may bring a new outside expertise to a job.

== Etymology ==
The Oxford English Dictionary states that the origins are uncertain, but that perhaps it is a corruption of the word recruit. The earliest example in the OED is from Rudyard Kipling's Barrack-Room Ballads (published 1892): "So 'ark an' 'eed, you rookies, which is always grumblin' sore", referring to rookies in the sense of raw recruits to the British Army. At least during the beginning of the 20th century, in the British Army the term "rookie" was typically used in place of "recruit" as exemplified in Trenching at Gallipoli by John Gallishaw (New York Century Co.: 1916) and in The Amateur Army by Patrick MacGill (London, Herbert Jenkins: 1915)

== Sports culture ==
In some sports there are traditions in which rookies must do things, or tricks are played on them. Examples in baseball include players having to dress up in very strange costumes, or getting hit in the face with a cream pie; a traditional rookie's "hazing" procedure in American football involves taping players to a goalpost and dousing them with ice water, Gatorade, and other substances.

- In Major League Baseball, the league has cracked down on hazing by enacting an Anti-Hazing and Anti-Bullying Policy which prohibits players from dressing up as the opposite sex, or wearing offensive costumes based on race, sex, nationality, age, sexual orientation, and gender identity.

=== American football ===
In the National Football League a rookie is any player who is in their first season playing professional football, having never signed a contract with a professional team before. The NFL awards the best rookie with the Associated Press NFL Rookie of the Year Award, as voted upon the Associated Press. In the NFL, rookies have special contract rules which limit how much a team can pay them as well as limiting the length of the contract, as per stipulations laid out in the NFL Collective Bargaining Agreement.

=== Auto racing ===
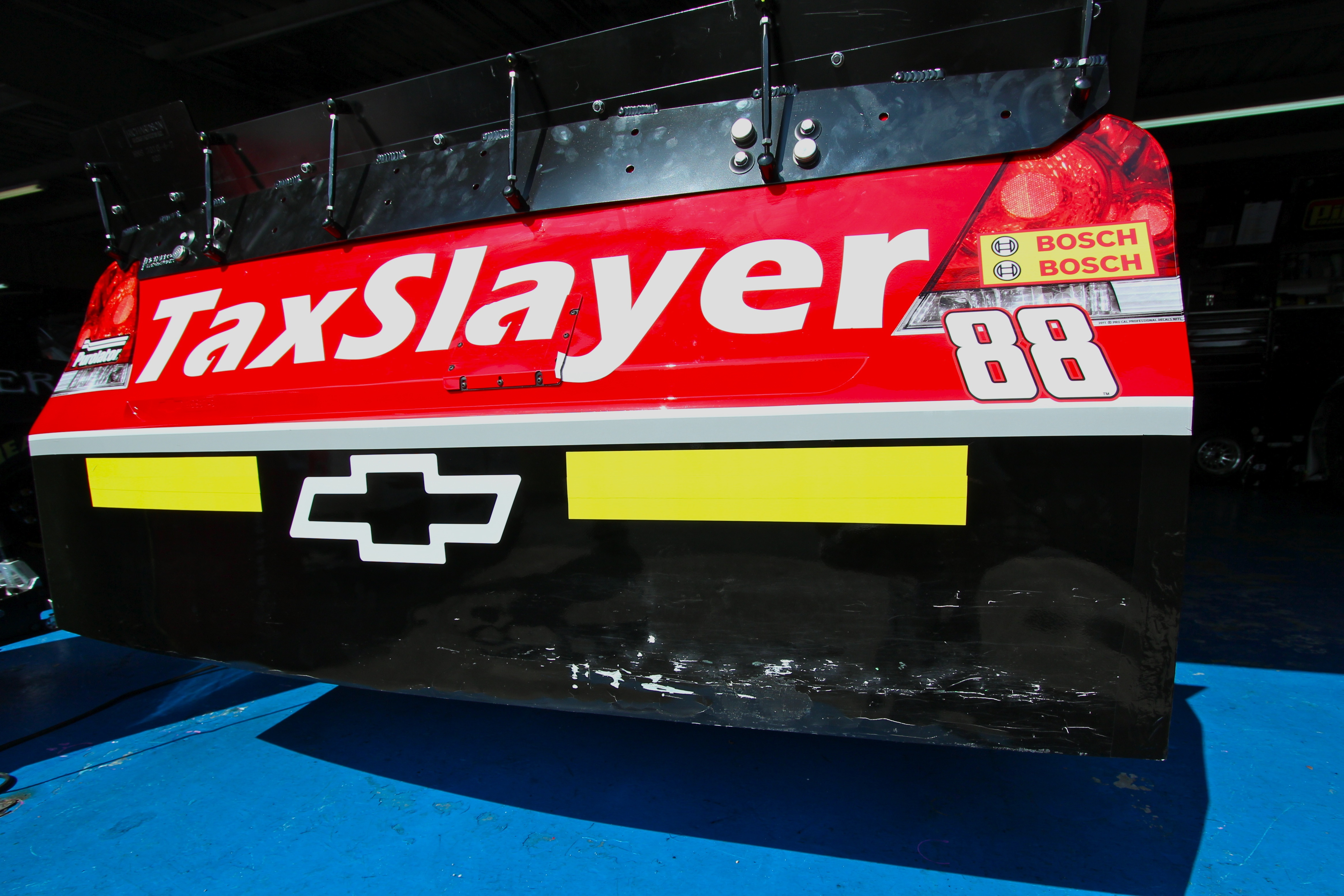
Cole Whitt's car with yellow rookie stripes

NASCAR and INDYCAR rookies (and non-rookie NASCAR drivers who are making their first start at a track that is not holding its first race) are denoted by a yellow stripe on sections of the car as prescribed in the respective rule books. In NASCAR, the rookie stripe is located on the tail panel of the race car.

==== NASCAR ====
The following rules are for rookie status in a national series:

- Must have run no more than five (prior to 2001 in Cup and Xfinity, and in the Truck Series for age-eligible drivers), seven (2001–10, Cup and Xfinity), and have been declared to race for driver points in that series (2011–present), races in any previous season.
  - In the Camping World Truck Series, a driver that is 17 at the start of the season and does not make ten starts overall is eligible in his first full season after turning 18. Truck Series drivers who are 16 and 17 may only participate in nine races during the season based on circuits.
- Drivers who compete in more than five races in a higher NASCAR-sanctioned series are not eligible for the award in a lower series if they have not declared for the higher series.
- If a driver does not start eight races before the end of Race 20 on the schedule, they will immediately become ineligible to earn rookie points for the rest of that season and starting in 2011, remained declared for that series. Drivers may change series declaration in order to avoid this.
- A driver may not receive rookie points if they start a race for a team that they did not qualify with. However, they are still eligible for championship points in that race.

==== INDYCAR ====
The following rules are for rookie status in the NTT IndyCar Series:

- Must not have participated in more than three NTT IndyCar Series races in a season.
- A veteran driver in the Indianapolis 500 may still be a Series Rookie if he has not competed in more than three series races overall.
- A driver who has never raced in the Indianapolis 500 but has made a legal season of NTT IndyCar Series races is still an Indianapolis 500 rookie in his first start.

=== Baseball ===
To qualify as a rookie in Major League Baseball (MLB), a player must not have exceeded 130 at bats or 50 innings pitched in the major leagues, and also fewer than 45 days on the active rosters of major-league clubs (excluding time on the injured list or any time after rosters are expanded on September 1) in their previous seasons. MLB annually bestows the Major League Baseball Rookie of the Year Award, as voted upon by the Baseball Writers' Association of America (BBWAA) and first awarded in 1947. Since 2001, MLB also issues the Major League Baseball Rookie of the Month Award.

=== Basketball ===
In the National Basketball Association, a rookie is any player who has never played a game in the NBA until that year and the past 1 years. The NBA awards the best rookie with the NBA Rookie of the Year Award, as voted upon by a selected panel of United States and Canadian sportswriters and broadcasters. In the NBA, rookies have special contract rules which limit how much a team can pay them as well as limiting the length of the contract.

=== Ice hockey ===
To qualify as a rookie in the National Hockey League, a player must not have played in more than 25 NHL games in any preceding seasons, nor in six or more NHL games in each of any two preceding seasons. Any player at least 26 years of age (by September 15 of that season) is not considered a rookie.

=== Soccer ===
In Major League Soccer, a rookie is a player who has had no prior professional experience. MLS awards the best rookie with the MLS Rookie of the Year Award.

== See also ==
- Rookie of the Year (award) – an award given to an athlete following the first year of full competition, for more impressive performance and/or better results than all other rookies that season.
- Freshman
- Novice
