= Daryl Johnston =

American football player and executive (born 1966)

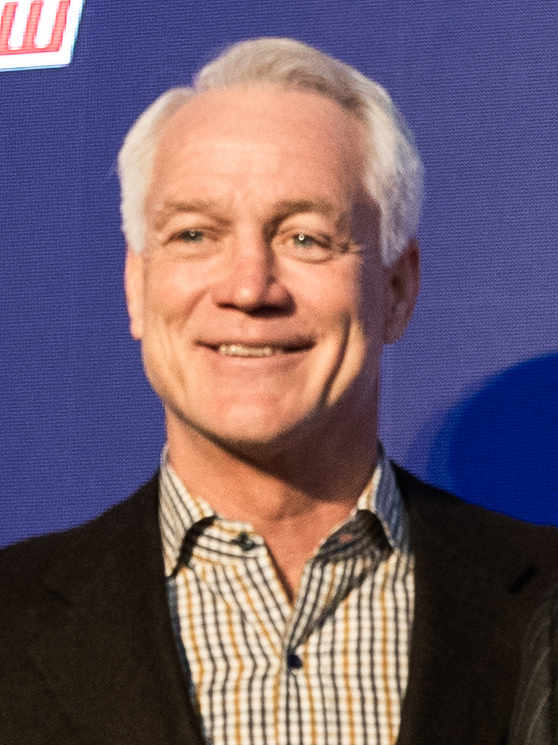
- Johnston in 2022

No. 48
- Position: Fullback

Personal information
- Born: February 10, 1966 (age 60); Youngstown, New York, U.S.
- Listed height: 6 ft 2 in (1.88 m)
- Listed weight: 242 lb (110 kg)

Career information
- High school: Lewiston-Porter (Youngstown)
- College: Syracuse (1984–1988)
- NFL draft: 1989: 2nd round, 39th overall pick

Career history

Playing
- Dallas Cowboys (1989–1999)

Operations
- San Antonio Commanders (2019) General manager; Dallas Renegades (2020) Director of player personnel; United States Football League (2022) Executive vice president of football operations; United States Football League (2023) President; United Football League (2024–2025) Executive vice president of football operations

Awards and highlights
- 3× Super Bowl champion (XXVII, XXVIII, XXX); 2× Pro Bowl (1993, 1994); All-American (1988); First-team All-East (1988)

Career NFL statistics
- Rushing yards: 753
- Rushing average: 3.2
- Touchdowns: 22
- Receiving yards: 2,227
- Stats at Pro Football Reference

Daryl Peter Johnston (born February 10, 1966) is an American sportscaster and former professional football fullback and executive. Nicknamed "Moose", he played 11 seasons in the National Football League (NFL), all for the Dallas Cowboys.

Johnston played college football for the Syracuse Orange. He was the general manager of the San Antonio Commanders of the Alliance of American Football (AAF) in 2019, the director of player personnel for the Dallas Renegades of the XFL in 2020, and served as the executive vice president of football operations for the revived incarnation of the USFL for its inaugural season, its president for the USFL's second season, and returning to the executive vice president role when the USFL merged with the XFL to form the United Football League and remaining their for its first two seasons as a merged league.

== Early life ==
Johnston was named Western New York Player of the Year in 1983 and simultaneously awarded the Connolly Cup, while playing for Lewiston-Porter High School (locally known as Lew-Port) in Lewiston, New York. The Lancers won the division during his senior year in 1984. His Lew-Port jersey (number 34) was retired on September 1, 2006. In 2008, he was inducted into the Greater Buffalo Sports Hall of Fame.

== College career ==
Johnston attended Syracuse University. As a redshirted freshman, he started playing on special teams and would earn the starting fullback position by his sophomore season in 1986.

While playing for Syracuse, Johnston was an All-Big East selection in 1987 and an All-American in 1988. He rushed for 1,830 yards and caught 46 passes during his collegiate career. He graduated with a degree in economics.

== College career statistics ==
Legend
**Bold**	Career high

Year	Team	Games	Rushing				Receiving			
Year	Team	GP	Att	Yds	Avg	TD	Rec	Yds	Avg	TD
1985	Syracuse	11	10	28	2.8	0	0	0	0.0	0
1986	Syracuse	11	102	469	4.6	0	17	114	6.7	0
1987	Syracuse	11	116	614	**5.3**	4	6	87	**14.5**	**1**
1988	Syracuse	11	**128**	**645**	5.0	**5**	**20**	**250**	12.5	0
		44	356	1,756	4.9	9	43	451	10.5	1

== Professional career ==
Pre-draft measurables
Height	Weight	20-yard shuttle	Vertical jump	Broad jump	Bench press
6 ft 1 3/4 in (1.87 m)	232 lb (105 kg)	4.17 s	28.5 in (0.72 m)	9 ft 5 in (2.87 m)	17 reps

Johnston was selected by the Dallas Cowboys in the second round (39th overall) of the 1989 NFL draft. As a rookie, he received his nickname "Moose" from backup quarterback Babe Laufenberg because of his large stature compared to the rest of the running backs. The name caught on among Dallas fans who would chant "Moooooose" whenever he made a play.

As a Cowboy, Johnston played in 149 consecutive games from 1989-1997. He also became one of the greatest special teams players in franchise history.

He scored 22 career touchdowns and had more receptions than carries. His 294 receptions is the third-highest number among Cowboys running backs, totaling 2,227 yards for a 7.6 yards average, compared to 232 carries for 753 yards for a 3.2 yards average. In 1993, Johnston had 50 receptions and averaged 7.4 yards per catch.

Due mainly to Johnston's contributions, the NFL created the fullback position in the Pro Bowl. Prior to this change, blocking fullbacks had little chance of beating out traditional running backs, who had better statistics. Johnston was selected to the Pro Bowl in 1993 and 1994.

Johnston retired at the end of the 1999 season, after suffering a neck injury in 1997. He was a member of three Super Bowl winning teams.

== NFL career statistics ==
Legend
**Bold**	Career high

Season	Team	GP	Rushing					Receiving				
Season	Team	GP	Att	Yds	Avg	Lng	TD	Rec	Yds	Avg	Lng	TD
1989	DAL	16	**67**	**212**	3.2	13	0	16	133	8.3	**28**	**3**
1990	DAL	16	10	35	3.5	8	1	14	148	**10.6**	26	1
1991	DAL	16	17	54	3.2	10	0	28	244	8.7	22	1
1992	DAL	16	17	61	3.6	14	0	32	249	7.8	18	2
1993	DAL	16	24	74	3.1	11	**3**	**50**	**372**	7.4	20	1
1994	DAL	16	40	138	3.5	9	2	44	325	7.4	24	2
1995	DAL	16	25	111	**4.4**	**18**	2	30	248	8.3	24	1
1996	DAL	16	22	48	2.2	7	0	43	278	6.5	23	1
1997	DAL	6	2	3	1.5	3	0	18	166	9.2	21	1
1998	DAL	16	8	17	2.1	6	0	18	60	3.3	9	1
1999	DAL	1	–	–	–	–	–	1	4	4.0	4	0
Career		151	232	753	3.2	18	8	294	2,227	7.6	28	14

== Legacy ==
Johnston was considered one of the greatest fullbacks of his day, while blocking for Emmitt Smith, as Smith went on to become the all-time NFL rushing leader. However, Johnston was not the lead blocker for Smith's entire career. A neck injury prematurely ended Johnston's career. Johnston was present the day Smith broke the rushing record; he was in the broadcasting booth, but came down onto the field to hug Smith and congratulate him afterward. As Smith made his victory lap of Texas Stadium after the record-setting carry, Johnston hung back in the shadows. When Smith saw Johnston, the two joined in an emotional embrace, with Smith telling Johnston, "I couldn't have done it without you." Johnston replied, "It was my pleasure. I couldn't imagine doing it for anybody else."

In 2010, Johnston was in the audience for Smith's induction into the Pro Football Hall of Fame. During his acceptance speech, a visibly emotional Smith spoke directly to Johnston, calling out the fact that, as a fullback, he had sacrificed himself for so many years to block for Smith. "Without you", Smith said, "I know that today would not have been possible."

== Broadcasting career ==
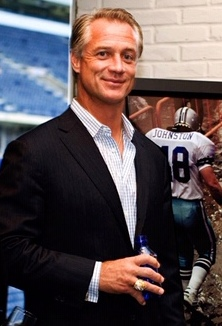
Johnston in 2007

In 2003, Johnston joined the program Players Inc Radio when it moved to Fox Sports Radio. The program was sponsored by NFL Players Inc.

Since 2001, Johnston has worked as a color commentator for NFL games on Fox Sports.

Beginning in 2013, he worked alongside Kenny Albert and formerly Dick Stockton. Previously, Johnston was on the second broadcast team with Stockton from 2001 to 2006 and Albert from 2007 to 2013. He also worked with Tony "Goose" Siragusa, until Siragusa's firing from Fox following the 2015 season. In 2017, he continued his esteemed broadcasting career with the NFL on Fox, teamed with Chris Myers and Laura Okmin. In 2020, he became paired with Kevin Burkhardt and Pam Oliver. He was paired with Joe Davis and Pam Oliver as the number 2 crew with Fox, but, for 2024, with Tom Brady’s arrival at Fox, he was demoted to the #5 team alongside Kevin Kugler.

In 2000, Johnston got his start calling NFL games by working the regular season and doing the High Definition broadcast of Super Bowl XXXV with Kevin Harlan for CBS Sports. He was an analyst for the NFL Network's "Total Access" until 2012.

Johnston also called the collegiate Cotton Bowl Classic game for Fox, first with Pat Summerall, and then eventually Kenny Albert.

He also was a guest star of the PBS television series Wishbone in its episode "Moonbone". He appears as a regular guest on First Things First on FS1 (2017/2018) with Cris Carter, Nick Wright, and Jenna Wolfe.

== Executive career ==
In 2018, Johnston became the General Manager of the San Antonio Commanders of the Alliance of American Football.

On May 15, 2019, he was named Director of Player Personnel for the Dallas Renegades of the new XFL.

On November 17, 2021, he was named Executive Vice President of Football Operations.

On April 6, 2023, he was named the President of Football Operations for the second season of the newest incarnation of the USFL, succeeding league co-founder Brian Woods. With the USFL and XFL's merger to form the United Football League in 2024, Johnston returned to the title of Executive Vice President of Football Operations, serving alongside XFL/UFL president (and fellow Western New Yorker) Russ Brandon. Johnston's position was eliminated upon Mike Repole's purchase of a minority stake in the UFL.

== Personal life ==
A native of Youngstown, New York, Johnston now resides in Dallas, Texas with his wife Diane, and two children.
