= NFL Player's Association Financial Registration Program =

Financial program for NFL players

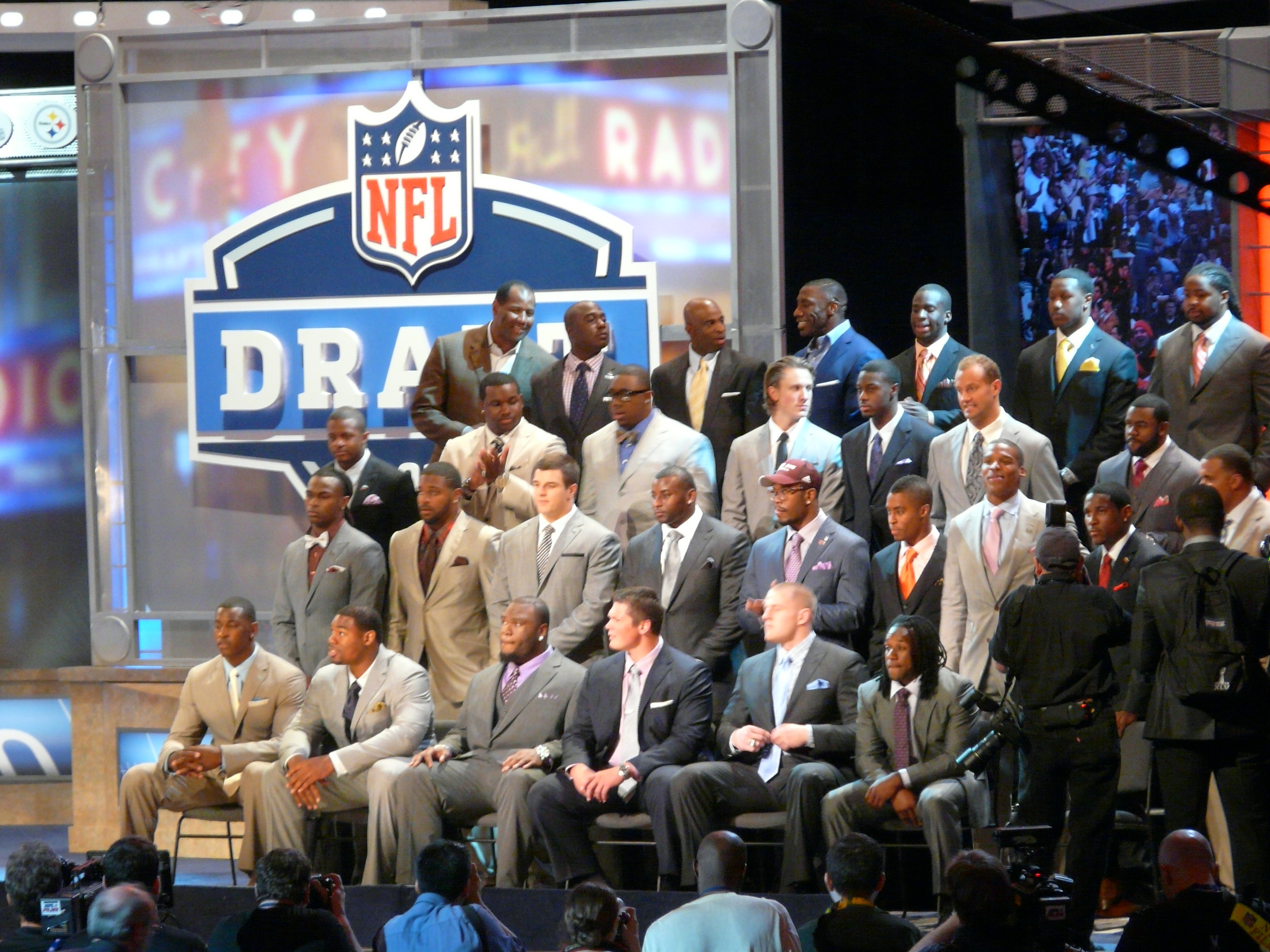
According to the NFL Players Association, at least 78 players lost a total of more than $42 million between 1999 and 2002 because they trusted money to financial advisers with questionable backgrounds.

The NFL Players Associations Financial Advisors Registration Program is a program that will provide NFL players with access to a list of financial advisors who are deemed qualified by the NFLPA. The program was created in 2002 after a series of many investment schemes targeted at professional athletes. It aims to provide an extra layer of protection to athletes to protect them from fraud and poor advice. Advisors must apply to the program and go through a full background check before being added to the list. In October 2019, the NFLPA began inviting financial institutions to register with the program, and currently have partnerships with Goldman Sachs and Bessemer Trust. While players can ultimately choose any investment advisor that they would like to work with, their sports agents can only recommend registered advisors on the list.

== Responsibility of a financial advisor ==
A financial adviser is a professional who works on behalf of an individual and provides them with advice to help them reach their financial goals. Some of their responsibilities include but are not limited to: understanding the financial markets, creating budgets, saving for retirement, tax planning, and building portfolios. The financial advisors registered in the NFLPA program specifically, have a fiduciary duty to their clients, meaning that legally they must put their clients interests first and represent clients objectively.

== Creation ==
The NFLPA established the Financial Advisors Registration Program in 2002, with the goal of providing players with an extra layer of protection from poor financial advice and from fraud. The NFLPA mentions that the players themselves requested a program like this. Many players come into the league at a young age, are uneducated and inexperienced financially, and therefore, can easily be targeted by scammers. The Financial Advisors Registration Program aims to eliminate this risk, and provide players with advisors and agents who are pre-screened by the NFL.

== Registration of a financial firm ==
As of October 2019, the NFLPA is allowing firms to join their program, on an invite-only basis. Currently, the NFLPA is partnered with Goldman Sachs and Bessemer Trust. The addition of financial institutions to the program will allow for an extra layer of protection for the players. Now, if a player loses money due to an investment scam, the firm behind the advisor will be responsible for recovering the loss. The NFLPA wants to ensure that players' money will be invested and budgeted well during the potential work stoppage, and throughout the rest of their career into retirement.

== Application process for individual advisors ==
For individual advisors, the initial fee to apply is $2,500. This consists of a $2,000 application fee and $500 for the first year of membership. If the advisor does not get approved to join the list, the $500 membership fee will be refunded. To apply for the program, an advisor must have a number of qualifications; these include but are not limited to:

Application Qualifications
| 1 | Bachelor's degree from an accredited university. |
| 2 | Every Applicant shall be a CERTIFIED FINANCIAL PLANNER™ (CFP®) and/or a Chartered Financial Analyst® (CFA). An individual who is currently a Registered Player Financial Advisor, but is not a CFP® or CFA must become compliant within three years of implementation of this Regulation, which is November 1, 2017. |
| 3 | Minimum of eight (8) years of licensed experience (qualifying licenses include FINRA series licenses, Attorney, CPA or an insurance license). |
| 4 | Fidelity bonding and professional liability insurance coverage as indicated in Section Two II D of the Regulations. |
| 5 | No civil, criminal or regulatory history related to fraud. |
| 6 | No pending customer complaints or litigation at the time of application. |
| 7 | Must not maintain custody of player funds unless deemed a qualified custodian |

== History of fraud in the NFL ==
Between 1999 and 2002, at least 78 NFL players had been defrauded of more than $42 million. This loss was a total of many investment schemes intended to target misinformed athletes. The goal of the NFL's Financial Advisors Registration Program is to protect players from these schemes, but there are still cases involving advisors defrauding professional athletes.

=== Kirk Wright ===
Wright, a hedge fund manager, was an approved advisor on the NFL's list. He hired an ex-NFL player as a consultant to his firm, and used him as a means to attract NFL players as clients. When his business collapsed, Wright was charged and convicted of 47 counts of fraud and money laundering. Wright gave clients statement which showed that their investments were worth up to 1000 times more than their real value. Seven NFL players who were involved in this scheme lost about $20 million.

=== Jeff Rubin ===
Rubin was one of the largest financial advisors in the NFL, with at least 45 players as clients. He was soon trusted amongst athletes when he saved them from a Ponzi scheme involving a former NFL agent, William "Tank" Black. Rubin's fall came when he advised clients to invest in a new casino establishment in Alabama, but when electronic bingo was later deemed illegal by the state of Alabama, the casino got raided and shut down. Through this investment, his clients lost a total of $43 million. Rubin was a registered advisor on the NFLPA financial advisors program, but noted that they never contacted him regarding the investments he had his clients in.

=== Jinesh "Hodge" Brahmbhatt ===
Brahmbhatt was a registered financial advisor with the NFLPA and ran his own company, Jade Wealth Management, where he had many clients who were NFL and NBA players. He had more than 30 of his clients invest in a company called Success Trade Securities (STS). STS was an online trading company where the CEO was later accused of running a Ponzi scheme; he would use newly issued promissory notes to pay off interest on older notes issued. The FINRA report accused Jade Wealth Management of recommending STS to athletes, and in turn, Jade received $1.25 million from STS over a few years. Brahmbhatt admitted that his clients invested more than $12 million in fraud notes from STS. After failing to provide the NFLPA with information on his role in the alleged fraudulent activities, the NFLPA removed him from their financial advisors program.
