= DeMaurice Smith =

American lawyer and labor leader (born 1964)

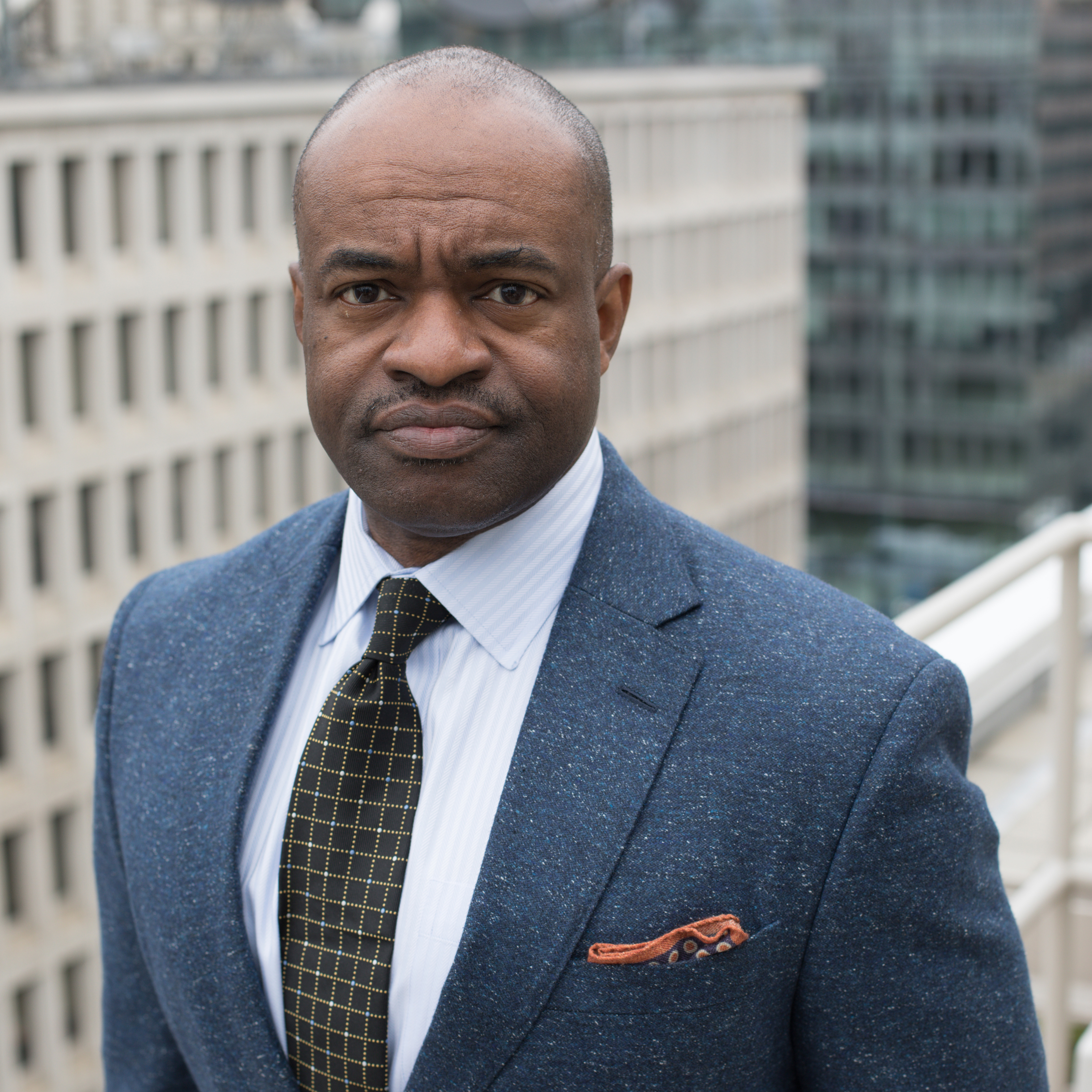
- Smith in 2018
- Born: February 3, 1964 (age 61); Washington, D.C., U.S.
- Education: Cedarville University (BA); University of Virginia (JD)
- Occupations: Attorney, former executive director of the NFL Players Association

DeMaurice F. "De" Smith (born February 3, 1964) is the former executive director of the National Football League Players Association (NFLPA). He was elected unanimously on March 15, 2009. As executive director of the NFLPA during the 2011 NFL lockout, Smith played a major role in helping the players and NFL owners come to terms on a new collective bargaining agreement.

Smith was replaced by Lloyd Howell Jr. on June 23, 2023.

== Education ==
Smith received his J.D. from the University of Virginia School of Law and his B.A. degree in political science from Cedarville University, a Baptist school in Ohio.

== Career ==
Prior to his work with the NFLPA, DeMaurice Smith was a trial lawyer and litigation partner in the Washington, D.C. offices of Latham & Watkins and Patton Boggs, serving as the chair of the firm's government investigations and white-collar practice group. Smith previously served as counsel to then-deputy attorney general Eric Holder in the U.S. Department of Justice before entering private practice. He spent nine years with the U.S. Attorney's office and one with the Department of Justice, working on issues like national security and prison construction. Smith has also represented Fortune 500 companies, and argued numerous cases before the U.S. Court of Appeals for the District of Columbia Circuit and the District of Columbia Court of Appeals.

On March 15, 2009, Smith was elected unanimously by a board of active player representatives to become the executive director of the National Football League Players Association (NFLPA). Although Smith lacked football experience, his ties to presidential power and business experts helped give him an advantage over other potential candidates like Troy Vincent, Trace Armstrong, and sports attorney David Cornwell. He was elected to his second and third terms in 2012 and 2015, respectively. As executive director, Smith has emphasized that players need to take more control of their careers, educate themselves, and be more involved in the process. Although his main role is to fight for better player salaries and improved safety, Smith has made it clear that long-term health care and increased benefits for tomorrow are just as important.

During Smith's first term as executive director of the NFLPA, the issue that dominated dialogue was the 2011 lockout. With improved player safety, better player salaries, long-term health care, and increased benefits for retired NFL players in mind, DeMaurice Smith helped the NFLPA negotiate with the NFL owners and agree on a new collective bargaining agreement in July 2011.

Smith spoke at the commencements for the University of Maryland in 2011 and the University of Virginia School of Law in May 2015. In August 2017, he joined the Prince George's County Lacrosse Club Board of Directors.
