= Lloyd Howell Jr. =

American businessman and labor leader (born 1966)

Lloyd Howell Jr. (born 1966) is an American businessman who is the former executive director of the NFL Players Association. He previously worked for Booz Allen Hamilton and retired from his position in December 2022.

While leading the NFLPA, Howell also worked as a part-time consultant for The Carlyle Group, the revelation of which led to accusations of a conflict of interest. He resigned from his position with the NFLPA on July 17, 2025 after an outside investigator hired by the union received documents showing Howell charged the union for visits to strip clubs in Miami Gardens and Atlanta.

He graduated from the University of Pennsylvania (BS) and Harvard Business School (MBA).
