= NFL Players Association =

US National Football League labor union

- Abbreviation: NFLPA
- Formation: 1956; 70 years ago
- Type: Trade union
- Legal status: 501(c)(5) organization
- Headquarters: Washington, D.C., U.S.
- Location: United States
- Members: 2,423 ("active player" and "associate" members); 8,751 ("former player" members); (2019)
- Executive director: JC Tretter
- President: Jalen Reeves-Maybin
- Subsidiaries: NFL Players Inc.
- Affiliations: AFL–CIO
- Website: nflpa.com

The National Football League Players Association (NFLPA) is the labor union representing National Football League (NFL) players in matters concerning wages, hours and working conditions, and protects their rights as professional football players. The NFLPA, which has headquarters in Washington, D.C., is led by executive director JC Tretter and president Jalen Reeves-Maybin. Founded in 1956, the NFLPA is the second-oldest labor union of the major North American professional sports leagues. It was established to provide players with formal representation to negotiate compensation and the terms of a collective bargaining agreement (CBA). The NFLPA is a member of the AFL-CIO, the largest federation of unions in the United States.

In addition to conducting labor negotiations, the NFLPA represents, empowers and protects the rights of the players. The organization's actions include filing grievances against player discipline that it deems too severe. The union also ensures that the terms of the collective bargaining agreement are adhered to by the league and the teams. Additionally, it negotiates and monitors retirement and insurance benefits, and enhances and defends the image of players and their profession.

In the early years of the NFL, contractual negotiations took place between individual players, their agents, and management; team owners were reluctant to engage in collective bargaining. A series of strikes and lockouts have occurred throughout the union's existence largely due to monetary and benefit disputes between the players and the owners. League rules that punished players for playing in rival football leagues resulted in litigation; the success of such lawsuits impelled the NFL to negotiate some work rules and minimum payments with the NFLPA. However, the organization was not recognized by the NFL as the official bargaining agent for the players until 1968, when a CBA was signed. The most recent CBA negotiations took place in 2020.

== Background ==
The establishment of the National Football League in 1920 featured early franchises haphazardly formed and often saddled with financial difficulties, poor player talent and attendance rates. As the league expanded through the years, players were provided with no formal representation and received few, if any, benefits. In 1943, Roy Zimmerman's refusal to play an exhibition game without compensation resulted in his trade from the Washington Redskins to the Philadelphia Eagles. With the formation of the competing All-America Football Conference (AAFC) in 1946, NFL owners instituted a rule which banned a player for five years from NFL-associated employment if he left the league to join the AAFC.

Bill Radovich, an offensive lineman, was one player who "jumped" leagues; he played for the Detroit Lions in 1945 and then joined the Los Angeles Dons of the AAFC after the team offered him a greater salary. Subsequently, Radovich was blacklisted by the NFL and was denied a tryout with the NFL-affiliated San Francisco Seals baseball team of the Pacific Coast League. Unable to attain a job in either league, Radovich filed a lawsuit against the NFL in 1956. The case, Radovich v. National Football League, 352 U.S. 445 (1957), made its way to the United States Supreme Court in January 1957, with the court ruling that the NFL constituted a business under American antitrust law and did not enjoy the same immunity accorded to Major League Baseball. This ruling "set the foundation for a series of court battles" over compensation and employment conditions.

== Initial organizing phase (1956–1967) ==
The NFLPA began when two players from the Cleveland Browns, Abe Gibron and Dante Lavelli, approached a lawyer and former Notre Dame football player, Creighton Miller, to help form an association to advocate for the players. Miller was initially reluctant but accepted in 1956. He contacted Don Shula (a Baltimore Colts player at the time), Joe Schmidt of the Detroit Lions, Frank Gifford and Sam Huff of the New York Giants, and Norm Van Brocklin of the Los Angeles Rams to aid in the development of the association.

By November 1956 a majority of the players signed cards allowing the NFLPA to represent them. Players for 11 of the 12 teams in the league voted to join the new association, with the Chicago Bears being the sole holdout.

An initial meeting was convened at the Waldorf-Astoria Hotel in November 1956 where players decided on demands to be submitted to league commissioner Bert Bell. One particularly sore point involved the lack of compensation for training camp and preseason exhibition games; while owners charged admission and benefitted from a lucrative series of preseason games, no contract payment was made until a player made a regular season roster. Players would work for up to eight weeks, risking season- or career-ending injury without pay.

The new association's initial agenda also included a league-wide minimum salary, plus a per diem when teams were on the road, a requirement that uniforms and equipment be paid for and maintained at the clubs' expense, and continued payment of salaries when players were injured. The NFLPA hoped to meet with Bell during the owners' meeting in January 1957 to discuss the demands; however, no meeting took place.

The owners, for their part, were immediately antagonistic to the concept of a players' union — a position epitomized when Miller, then an assistant coach with the Cleveland Browns, was removed from the team's annual photo at the insistence of head coach and general manager Paul Brown. Miller and other union founders were taken aback by Paul Brown's staunch view that "it was both just and necessary that management could cut, trade, bench, blackball, and own in perpetuity anyone and everyone that it wanted".

Miller continued to represent the NFLPA in their early days. Unable to win the owners' attention by forming the union, the NFLPA threatened to bring an antitrust lawsuit against the league. The antitrust laws are meant to protect "free and fair competition in the marketplace" and prohibit practices that may give industries or businesses an unfair advantage over their competitors.

Rather than face another lawsuit, the owners agreed to a league minimum salary of $5,000, $50 for each exhibition game played, and medical and hospital coverage. Although most of the NFLPA's requests were met, the owners did not enter into a collective bargaining agreement with the association or formally recognize it as the players' exclusive bargaining representative, instead agreeing to change the standard player contract and alter governing documents to reflect the deal.

From the inception of the NFLPA, its members were divided over whether it should act as a professional association or a union. Against the wishes of NFLPA presidents Pete Retzlaff and Bernie Parrish, Miller ran the association as a "'grievance committee'" rather than engaging in collective bargaining. The standard collective bargaining agreement (CBA) is a contract between organized workers and management that determines the wages and hours worked by employees and can also determine the scope of one's work and what benefits employees receive. The association continued to use the threat of antitrust litigation over the next few years as a lever to gain better benefits, including a pension plan and health insurance.

In the 1960s the NFL also faced competition from the new American Football League (AFL). NFL players viewed the new league as potential leverage for them to improve their contracts. The NFL tried to discourage this idea by changing the owner-controlled pension plan to add a provision saying that a player would lose his pension if he went to another league.

On January 14, 1964, players in the newer league formed the AFL Players Association, and elected linebacker Tom Addison of the Boston Patriots as president. Rather than working with the AFLPA, the NFLPA chose to remain apart and tried to block the merger between the two leagues in 1966, though lack of funding prevented it from mounting a formal challenge. With the merger complete, the players could no longer use the leverage of being able to sign with an AFL team to attain more money.

Parrish, upset with the ineffectiveness of the association, proposed forming a players' union, that would be independent of the NFLPA, with the assistance of the International Brotherhood of Teamsters (IBT). The IBT pushed for the NFLPA to join the trucking union. In early November 1967, Parrish, with support from former Cleveland Browns player Jim Brown, began distributing union cards to form a Teamsters affiliate known as the American Federation of Pro Athletes. The NFLPA rejected the overture at its meeting in Hollywood, Florida, during the first week of January 1968 and declared itself an independent union. Although Parrish's proposal was defeated, Miller left his position as counsel to the union. He was later replaced by two Chicago labor lawyers, Dan Schulman and Bernie Baum.

== Recognition and certification (1968–1983) ==
Six months after the NFLPA declared itself an independent union, many players were dissatisfied with the lack of compensation teams provided and voted to strike on July 3, 1968, after official discussions with the owners stalled. The owners countered by declaring a lockout. By July 14, 1968, the brief work stoppage came to an end. Although a CBA resulted, many players felt that the agreement did not net them as many benefits as they had hoped. The owners agreed to contribute about $1.5 million to the pension fund with minimum salaries of $9,000 for rookies, $10,000 for veterans and $50 per exhibition game; there was at yet no neutral arbitration for disputes.

As the merger of the AFL and NFL became effective in 1970, the unions agreed to meet for the first time in January of that year. The NFL players wanted Ed Meador—who was the president-elect of the NFLPA prior to the merger—to become president of the newly combined association while the AFL players wanted Jack Kemp. The compromise was John Mackey of the Baltimore Colts, an NFL team before the merger, which was grouped with former AFL teams in the American Football Conference. The AFL players agreed to Mackey's election on the condition that former AFL player Alan Miller would become general counsel. Though the NFL owners were open to recognizing the union, their representatives requested lawyers not be present during negotiations, something the players were unwilling to agree to. This prompted the players to petition the National Labor Relations Board (NLRB) for union certification.

=== 1970 strike ===
The NFLPA voted to strike on July 3, 1970, after having filed an unfair labor practices charge with the NLRB the previous month. The strike ended on August 3, just in time to avoid cancellation of preseason games. A new four-year CBA was reached after the owners threatened to cancel the season. With the new agreement, the union won the right for players to bargain through their own agents with the clubs, and minimum salaries were increased to $12,500 for rookies and $13,000 for veterans. Also, players' pensions were improved and dental care was added to the players' insurance plans. Players also gained the right to select representation on the league's retirement board and the right to impartial arbitration for injury grievances. Following the 1970 agreement, many union representatives were released by their teams. Unfazed, the players were determined to create a stronger union through better communication. Attorney Ed Garvey was hired by the NFLPA in 1971 to act as their first executive director, and the NFLPA became officially certified as a union by the NLRB the same year. Headquarters were established in Washington, D.C., and a campaign was launched to help inform players of their rights.

=== 1974 strike ===
The NFLPA challenged the so-called "Rozelle Rule" as a violation of federal antitrust laws in a lawsuit filed by president John Mackey and allied union leaders in 1971. The rule, named after commissioner Pete Rozelle, allowed the commissioner to award compensation, which included players, to a team losing a free agent if both the signing team and the team the player was departing could not come to an agreement on compensation. This rule limited player movement, as few teams were willing to sign high-profile free agents only to risk having their rosters raided. With the 1970 CBA agreement set to expire, the players went on strike on July 1, 1974. In addition to the "Rozelle Rule", the players demanded the elimination of the option clause, impartial arbitration of disputes, elimination of the draft and waiver system and individual, rather than uniform contracts. The strike did not stop the 1974 preseason from going forward; the NFL used all-rookie squads as replacement players to play out the preseason schedule until the strike was resolved.

The strike lasted until August 10, 1974, when the players returned to training camp without a new CBA, instead choosing to pursue free agency through the Mackey lawsuit filed three years before. (Note: Mackey v. NFL, 543 F.2d 606 (8th Cir. 1976), cert. denied, 434 U.S. 801) While the courts ruled in favor of the players in 1976, the union found that making progress in bargaining was more difficult to achieve. The Rozelle Rule was invalidated by the court which found it constituted a refusal to deal and was therefore in violation of the Sherman Act as it deterred franchises from signing free agents. However, the change did not achieve true free agency as compensation remained tied to draft picks that were awarded based on the salary of the departing free agent and teams still maintained a right of first refusal. The NFL and NFLPA agreed to a new collective bargaining agreement in March 1977 that ran until 1982.

=== 1982 strike ===
The 1982 NFL strike began on September 21 and ended on November 16, lasting 57 days. During this time, no NFL games were played. The strike occurred because the union demanded that a wage scale based on percentage of gross revenues be implemented. The NFLPA wanted the percentage to be 55 percent, and according to the Los Angeles Times, this demand "dominated the negotiations."

During the strike, the NFLPA promoted two "AFC–NFC 'all-star' games." One was held at RFK Stadium in Washington, D.C., on October 17, and the second was held at the Los Angeles Memorial Coliseum a day later. One of the few stars who did play, future Hall of Fame running back John Riggins, explained "I guess I'll do just about anything for money." Despite a local TV blackout of WTBS and ticket prices starting at six dollars, neither game drew well; only 8,760 fans attended in Washington and 5,331 in Los Angeles. With no NFL games to air, CBS replayed the previous Super Bowl and aired Division III football; Pat Summerall and John Madden, for example, covered a game between Baldwin Wallace and Wittenberg. NBC acquired the rights to Canadian Football League games from ESPN, and both networks aired their respective games with NFL-like production values. However, the three CFL games NBC showed were all blowouts (by a total of 96 points) with poor ratings, and the network gave up.

The 1982 strike ended with a players' revolt against their own union, as some members suggested that Garvey step down as executive director. As a result of the strike, the season schedule was reduced from 16 games to 9 and the playoffs expanded the then-standard 10 to 16 teams (eight from each conference) for this one-season only "Super Bowl tournament." A new five-year agreement was ratified, providing severance packages to players upon retirement, an increase in salaries and post-season pay, and bonuses based on the number of years of experience in the league. Additionally, the NFLPA was allowed to receive copies of all player contracts.

== Gene Upshaw era (1983–2008) ==
In 1983, former Oakland Raider Gene Upshaw became the executive director of the NFLPA. During his tenure, he oversaw a player strike, several antitrust lawsuits, and the collective bargaining agreement of 1993.

=== 1987 strike ===
The NFLPA went on strike for a month in 1987 upon the expiration of the 1982 CBA; the league's free-agent policy was the major matter in dispute. This time, however, the strike only canceled one week of the season. During those three weeks the NFL staged games with hastily assembled replacement teams, made up principally of players cut during training camp and players left out of work from the closure of the United States Football League two years prior (along with, to a lesser extent, the Montreal Alouettes of the Canadian Football League (CFL), who had folded just three months prior to the strike). They were joined by a few veterans who crossed the picket lines, including New York Jets defensive end Mark Gastineau, Dallas Cowboys defensive tackle Randy White, San Francisco 49ers quarterback Joe Montana, New England Patriots quarterback Doug Flutie, and Seattle Seahawks wide receiver Steve Largent.

Given the willingness of the players to cross the picket lines and networks to broadcast the replacement games, despite a 20% drop in television viewership and even steeper drops in attendance, the union failed to achieve their demands. The strike ended on October 15, 1987, without a collective bargaining agreement in place. The union filed a new antitrust lawsuit on December 30 asking federal judge David Doty to overturn the league's restricting free agent policies.

On November 1, 1989, the Court of Appeals rejected the suit on the grounds that the owners were covered by the labor exemption from antitrust law. The union's next tactic, in November 1989, was to disclaim any interest in representing NFL players in collective bargaining and to reform itself as a professional organization. Having done that, individual players, led by Freeman McNeil of the New York Jets, brought a new antitrust action, challenging the NFL's so-called "Plan B" free agency, which gave teams a right of first refusal to sign a player, as an unlawful practice under the antitrust acts.

The players ultimately prevailed after a jury trial on their claims. That verdict, the pendency of other antitrust cases and the threat of a class action lawsuit filed by Reggie White, then with the Philadelphia Eagles, on behalf of all NFL players caused the parties to settle the antitrust cases and to agree on a formula that permitted free agency. In return, the owners received a salary cap, albeit one tied to a formula based on the players' share of total league revenues. The agreement also established a salary floor—minimum payrolls all teams were obliged to pay. The settlement was presented to and approved by Judge Doty, who had also heard the McNeil antitrust case in 1993. Once the agreement was approved, the NFLPA reconstituted itself as a labor union and entered into a new collective bargaining agreement with the league. The NFLPA and the league extended the 1993 agreement five times. The final extension came in March 2006 when it was extended through the 2010 season after the NFL owners voted 30–2 to accept the NFLPA's final proposal.

=== Financial Registration Program ===
The NFLPA's Financial Registration Program was created in 2002 after a series of many investment schemes targeted at professional athletes. It aims to provide an extra layer of protection to athletes to protect them from fraud and poor advice, and provide players with advisors and agents who are pre-screened by the NFL.

== DeMaurice Smith era (2009–2023) ==
Following the death of Gene Upshaw in 2008, Richard Berthelsen was named interim executive director, serving from August 2008 until March 2009. The NFLPA Board of Representatives elected DeMaurice Smith for a three-year term as the executive director on March 16, 2009. Smith presided over two CBA negotiations during his tenure, first in 2011 after a four-month lockout and then in 2020 just before the COVID-19 pandemic. He served five terms before stepping down in 2023.

=== 2011 lockout ===
In May 2008, the owners decided to opt out of the 1993 arrangement, per the agreement with the players, with the termination to follow a year with no salary cap in 2010. By the CBA's expiration in March 2011, the NFLPA and the NFL had not yet come to terms on a new agreement. The owners were expected to lock out the players upon termination of the agreement. However, the NFLPA filed papers to decertify as a union on March 11, 2011, and filed an antitrust suit to enjoin the lockout with lead plaintiffs quarterbacks Tom Brady, Peyton Manning, and Drew Brees. U.S. District Court judge Susan Richard Nelson granted the players' request to end the owners' lockout on April 25. The league asked Nelson to stay the order while they appealed to the Eighth Circuit Court of Appeals; Nelson refused. On April 29, the Eighth Circuit granted the league a temporary stay of Nelson's ruling; the league reinstated the lockout the same day. The Eighth Circuit vacated Nelson's ruling on July 8, affirming the legitimacy of the lockout. During the lockout, players were barred from using team facilities and contacting team coaches; many organized their own workout regimens.

The parties settled the lawsuit on July 25, 2011, and a majority of players signed union authorization cards. The NFL officially recognized the NFLPA's status as the players' collective bargaining representative on July 30, 2011. The NFL and NFLPA proceeded to negotiate terms for a new collective bargaining agreement, and the agreement became effective after ratification by the players August 4, 2011. The agreement, which ran through 2021, stated that revenue sharing (the most contentious issue during the lockout) was re-designed so that the players must receive at least 47% of all revenue in salary for the term of the agreement. Additionally, a limit was placed on the amount of money given to rookies. $50,000,000 was set aside annually for medical research and approximately $1 billion would be set aside for retired player benefits over the life of the agreement.

=== Bountygate ===
The NFLPA, on behalf of Will Smith, Scott Fujita and Anthony Hargrove, three players suspended due to the Bountygate investigation by the NFL, filed a lawsuit against the league. The investigation found that New Orleans Saints players were allegedly paid bonuses for hits that injured opposing players. The players' lawsuit claimed NFL commissioner Roger Goodell "had violated the league's labor agreement by showing he had pre-determined the guilt of the players punished in the bounty probe before serving as the arbitrator for their June 18 appeal hearing". The suspensions were unanimously overturned by a three-member appeals panel; however, the ruling did not permanently void their suspensions. The NFL appointed former commissioner Paul Tagliabue to review the NFL's sanctions against the players, which he overturned.

=== Drug policy ===
The league and the NFLPA approved updated substance abuse and performance-enhancing substance policies in September 2014. The regulations include human growth hormone testing and amended rules on DUIs and marijuana. Third-party arbitration will handle appeals. The deal lifted suspensions for some players the week it was approved. The NFL began testing players for HGH the next month.

=== 2020 CBA ===
In a tight vote (1,019-959), NFL players voted to approve ratification of a new, 10-year collective bargaining agreement in March 2020.

Highlights

==== Revenue Share ====
Players received an increase of league revenue, from 47% to 48%, and increase in the media share called a "media kicker." This includes a larger share of the revenue from TV contracts. The share can climb up to 48.8%. Players also receive a share from legal gambling operations done in stadiums.

17 games

The NFL secured the option to increase the regular season to 17 games, which it exercised starting with the 2021 season.

Increased Minimum Salary

20% bump starting at $610,000 (up from $510,000) and increasing to $1.065 million in 2030.

34-week pay period

Before players were paid in 17 weekly installments during the regular season. Now they collect paychecks for eight months out of the year instead of four. Teams that earn a first-round playoff bye now receive postseason pay for that week.

Postseason

The CBA expanded the playoff field by two teams, generating an estimated $150 million more in revenue. Each conference now has seven playoff teams, meaning three wild-card teams and six games in the first weekend of the postseason.

International games

The league can hold up to 10 international games per season through 2025. If the league wants to add more after 2025, the union must agree to it. If a team plays more than one international game in a season, players receive $5,000 stipends for each extra game.

Commissioner discipline/arbitration

The new CBA provides neutral arbitration for most discipline cases (including personal conduct policy violations) and carries "significant reductions" in club fines and on-field player fines. The Commissioner is no longer the sole judge and appeals hearing officer in most discipline matters.

Training Camp

Padded practices reduced from 28 to 16 during training camp with a five-day acclimation period.

Expanded Rosters

Active players increased from 46 to 48. Practice squads increased from 10 to 12. Practice Squad salaries also increased with added benefits of 401k and tuition assistance

Changes to the drug policy

Eliminates suspensions for positive marijuana tests, limits the testing period to the first two weeks of training camp and raises the threshold for a positive test from 35 to 150 nanograms of THC. First violation of Performance-Enhancing drugs is a two-game suspension, while a second violation carries a six-game suspension. Punishment for a DUI is a three-game suspension. Suspended players will be allowed at the team facility during the second half of their suspension period.

=== COVID Season ===
Due to the COVID-19 pandemic, the NFLPA returned to the negotiating table with the NFL to create CBA amendments that proved key to it being the first professional sports league to complete a season during the global pandemic. The league eliminated preseason games, the Pro Bowl, and international games. The union negotiated for players to have the right to opt out of the season without violating their contracts.

The season started a week later than usual on September 10, and during what proved to be the league's final 16-game season, no games were cancelled due to COVID.

Also included in the CBA amendments were daily testing of all players and club personnel, stipend payment for high-risk and voluntary player opt-outs, and a 20-day ramp-up period for training camp.

The salary cap floor was set at $175 million and the expected revenue loss was spread out over four seasons, minimizing the need for massive player cuts and contract slashing.

On March 3, 2022, the NFLPA and NFL agreed to suspend COVID protocols for the upcoming season. Players that tested positive for COVID during that season were required to self-isolate for five days after the test. Masks were no longer required, but players could wear them and clubs could require them. Offseason practices were also eliminated for that season.

== Lloyd Howell Jr. era (2023–2025) ==
Lloyd Howell Jr. was named executive director on June 23, 2023. Field surfaces emerged as a key issue during his tenure. In his state of the union address at the NFLPA's Super Bowl press conference in 2024, Howell said that 92% of player members preferred to play on grass fields based on that year's survey. NFLPA President JC Tretter echoed that data, pointing to scientific and anecdotal evidence. The union's push led to the complete elimination of one of the more dangerous artificial surfaces, slit film turf, from NFL stadiums by the start of the 2024 season.

Howell resigned on July 17, 2025 amid numerous scandals, including an alleged conflict of interest due to Howell's position at a private equity firm invested in the NFL, an ongoing FBI probe into a group-licensing firm partially owned by the NFLPA, and a controversial confidentiality agreement on an arbitration of alleged salary cap collusion within the NFL.

== David White interim era (2025–2026) ==
Shortly after Howell's resignation, the NFLPA Board of Player Representatives selected David White to serve as the union's interim executive director on August 3, 2025. White is a seasoned labor executive who previously served 12 years as the executive director of SAG-AFTRA and was a finalist for the NFLPA's executive director position in 2023.

== JC Tretter era (2026–present) ==
JC Tretter was elected as the executive director of the NFLPA on March 17, 2026. He previously served as the NFLPA's president from 2020 to 2024 while he was an active player.

== NFLPA Team Report Cards ==
In 2023, the NFLPA released the inaugural Team Report Cards. The initiative stems from one of the union's core jobs, which is to improve the overall working conditions for its player members. By highlighting best practices across the league, the Report Cards have raised the standard across the league and provided a resource for players to make informed career decisions.

The results are compiled from direct feedback by players that is gathered each fall through a survey, with questions and categories shaped in partnership with expert survey firm Artemis Strategy Group to reflect what players value. Topics vary from training rooms to family spaces and dining hall options to travel accommodations and team leadership, and more.

The survey had a 77% participation rate in 2024 and 2025, and teams seem to be listening, resulting in better facilities, upgraded locker rooms, enhanced family spaces, improved travel accommodations and other positive changes across the league.

== Composition ==
According to NFLPA's Department of Labor records since 2006, much of the union's membership are classified as "former players" and are not eligible to vote in the union, "because, as a matter of federal law, they cannot be members of the collective bargaining unit." The other, voting eligible, classifications are "active players" and "associate members". As of 2023, these include 13,213 "former player members", 2,125 "active players", and 438 "associate members". For comparison, in 2014 these figures were 3,130, 1,959, and 207 (respectively).

== Leadership ==
The current executive director of the NFLPA is JC Tretter and the President is Jalen Reeves-Maybin. As of 2026, the executive committee consists of Oren Burks, Zaire Franklin, Harrison Phillips, Tanoh Kpassagnon, Cameron Heyward, Case Keenum, Ted Karras, Jonathan Greenard, Brandon McManus, and Thomas Morstead. Each NFL team also has a player representative, along with three alternate representatives.

Leader	Year(s)
Executive directors
John Gordy	January 16, 1969 – November 1, 1969
Malcolm Kennedy Jr.	1969 – 1971
Ed Garvey	1971 – June 1983
Gene Upshaw	June 13, 1983 – August 20, 2008
Richard Berthelsen	August 20, 2008 – March 16, 2009
DeMaurice Smith	March 16, 2009 – June 29, 2023
Lloyd Howell Jr.	June 29, 2023 – July 17, 2025
David White	August 3, 2025 – March 17, 2026
JC Tretter	March 17, 2026 – present
Presidents
NFLPA (pre-merger)
Kyle Rote	January 26, 1956 – January 4, 1958
Bill Howton	January 26, 1958 – January 4, 1962
Pete Retzlaff	January 4, 1962 – January 5, 1964
Ordell Braase	January 5, 1964 – January 8, 1967
Mike Pyle	January 8, 1967 – January 11, 1968
John Gordy	January 11, 1968 – January 16, 1969
John Mackey	January 16, 1969 – 1970
AFLPA
Tom Addison	January 14, 1964 – 1965
Jack Kemp	1965 – 1970
NFLPA (post-merger)
John Mackey	1970 – 1973
Bill Curry	1973 – May 31, 1975
Kermit Alexander	May 31, 1975 – March 8, 1976
Dick Anderson	March 8, 1976 – January 26, 1978
Len Hauss	January 26, 1978 – 1980
Gene Upshaw	1980 – June 13, 1983
Jeff Van Note	June 13, 1983 – February 1984
Tom Condon	February 1984 – April 24, 1986
Marvin Powell	April 24, 1986 – March 4, 1988
George Martin	March 4, 1988 – June 13, 1989
Mike Kenn	June 13, 1989 – March 16, 1996
Trace Armstrong	March 16, 1996 – March 29, 2004
Troy Vincent	March 29, 2004 – March 19, 2008
Kevin Mawae	March 19, 2008 – March 25, 2012
Domonique Foxworth	March 25, 2012 – March 19, 2014
Eric Winston	March 19, 2014 – March 10, 2020
JC Tretter	March 10, 2020 – March 8, 2024
Jalen Reeves-Maybin	March 8, 2024 – present

== See also ==
- NFLPA Collegiate Bowl
- NFL Players Inc.
- Alan Page Community Award
