= Peace Collective =

Peace Collective is a Canadian clothing brand based in Toronto, Ontario, Canada. It was founded in 2014 by Yanal Dhailieh. Peace Collective is part of charitable group Peace Foundation, whose philanthropic efforts operate as a one-for-one model, with each purchase leading to a donation going directly to a Canadian in need.

== Partnerships ==
Peace Collective have formed partnerships with major popular culture brands in Canada, such as the Toronto Blue Jays and the Juno Awards, in the form of official clothing lines featuring logos and messages related to these brands. These partnerships have supported to contribute to the Peace Foundation's charitable efforts by raising awareness and through celebrity endorsements.
