= NFL collective bargaining agreement =

Labor agreement between players and the National Football League

The NFL collective bargaining agreement (CBA) is a labor agreement which reflects the results of collective bargaining negotiations between the National Football League Players Association (NFLPA) and National Football League (NFL) (the commissioner and the 32 teams team owners). The labor agreement classifies distribution of league revenues, sets health and safety standards and establishes benefits, including pensions and medical benefits, for all players in the NFL. The first collective bargaining agreement was reached in 1968 after player members of the NFLPA voted to go on strike to increase salaries, pensions and benefits for all players in the league. Later negotiations of the collective bargaining agreement called for injury grievances, a guaranteed percentage of revenues for players, an expansion of free agency and other issues impacting the business of the NFL. The NFLPA and team owners have negotiated seven different agreements since 1968.

The currently active agreement was ratified in 2020 and extends through the 2030 season, and includes changes to league revenue distribution, increases in player benefits and health and safety improvements, increasing the regular season to 17 games played, and increasing active roster and practice squad limits.

== 1968 agreement ==
In 1968, the National Football League Players Association was first recognized in writing by National Football League team owners. This occurred after the player members of the NFLPA voted to go on strike, intending to pressure owners to increase minimum salaries, pensions and other benefits for all players. In response, NFL team owners locked out the players who were on strike. After eleven days of work stoppage, the first collective bargaining agreement (CBA) was reached between the NFL and the NFLPA. The agreement set a minimum salary of $9,000 per year for rookie players and $10,000 per year for veteran players. It also set aside $1.5 million of league revenue to be contributed to player pensions.

== 1970 agreement ==
A new agreement was negotiated in 1970 after the NFLPA merged with the American Football League Players Association. During negotiations over the new CBA, players went on strike in July 1970. The new agreement was reached after four days. The agreement increased minimum player salaries and altered the league's medical and pension programs. It also provided for impartial arbitration of injury grievances, which had previously been decided by the NFL Commissioner. John Mackey was elected as president of the NFLPA during this negotiation, and the new agreement was projected to cover the 1970 through 1973 seasons.

== 1974 strike ==
In 1974, the veteran NFL players went on strike for five weeks, declaring "No Freedom, No Football," but they received no concessions before reporting to training camp after a two-week "cooling off" period. The strike never resumed, and the NFLPA player representatives voted instead to pursue a previously filed lawsuit, Mackey v. NFL, which challenged the Rozelle Rule restrictions on free agency as a violation of the federal antitrust laws. The Rozelle Rule was a compensation clause which outlined that a team losing a free agent would get equal value in return. Player confidence in the NFLPA was weakened by the strike's ineffectiveness. By 1975, fewer than half of players in the NFL were paying their union dues.

== 1977 agreement ==
After players won the Mackey case in court, the NFLPA and the owners settled on a new CBA which implemented a new first refusal and compensation system to replace the Rozelle Rule. The new system still placed restrictions on players' free agency. The court decision outlined that compensation for draft picks was to be awarded on the basis of the salaries received by departing free agents. The agreement reached in 1977 significantly improved some medical and pension benefits for players and gained neutral arbitration of all player/club disputes.

== 1982 agreement ==
In 1982, after playing the first two games of the season, NFL players went on strike again, seeking to attain a guaranteed percentage of club and league revenues. This strike lasted 57 days, making it the longest work stoppage in NFL history until that date. The strike ended with a tentative agreement on November 16 which included funds to cover players' lost wages during the work stoppage. Negotiators signed a new collective bargaining agreement on December 5. The agreement improved players' benefits by implementing a new severance pay benefit, increasing minimum salaries for players in all years of service, and adding new medical rights for players. The agreement also included a revamped season schedule for 1982, which had a nine-game regular season and a new playoff format which allowed 16 of the league's 28 teams to qualify for the playoffs. Additionally, the agreement included a guarantee from the owners that players would collectively receive at least $1.6 billion in salaries and benefits over the five-year term of the new agreement.

== 1987 strike ==
After playing the first two games of the season in 1987, players went on strike for free agency. In response to the strike, team owners brought in replacement players and continued the regular season after one week. Several well-known players, including Joe Montana, Lawrence Taylor and Tony Dorsett crossed the picket lines to rejoin their teams alongside these new replacements. On October 15, players voted to end the strike, to instead pursue a legal challenge to the free agency restrictions in court. In January 1988 Judge David Doty sided with the players in ruling that the clubs' continuance of the first refusal and compensation restrictions on free agents was not protected by the labor exemption to the antitrust laws. But in July 1988 Doty refused to grant an injunction which would have freed the players from the restrictions, ruling that the federal Norris-LaGuardia Act prevented courts from issuing injunctions in labor disputes. He urged both sides of the conflict to return to the bargaining table while in preparation for an anti-trust trial.

In 1989, team owners unilaterally implemented a limited free agency system called "Plan B". This allowed teams to continue to impose first refusal and compensation restrictions on their top 37 players. The new system also allowed players at the bottom of the roster to sign with other teams without restriction. The average salary of the players signed under Plan B increased by 40.3 percent.

In November 1989 the 8th Circuit Court of Appeals ruled that team owners were exempt from the federal antitrust laws so long as players were adequately represented by a union. That same year, the NFLPA decertified as a union, stating its union status provided more protection for the owners than for the players. The NFL continued to operate without a collective bargaining agreement until 1993.

== 1993 agreement ==
The NFL and its players began negotiations after players won the Freeman McNeil legal case brought against Plan B. The jury decided on September 10, 1992 that Plan B was too restrictive under federal antitrust laws. Subsequently, team owners agreed to discuss free agency for all players. The NFLPA filed a class action suit in the name of Reggie White, claiming that all players in the NFL should receive money damages as a result of the illegality of Plan B. The settlement provided for payment of almost $200 million in damages, and was contingent upon the NFLPA re-forming as a union and signing a new CBA which would incorporate the terms of the litigation settlement. A seven-year CBA was signed in the spring of 1993, making it the first agreement of its kind since 1987. The new CBA provided players with unlimited free agency after playing four years in the league, subject to an exception for one franchise player per club after first year of the new CBA. In return, the NFLPA agreed to a salary cap based upon an agreed percentage of revenues. The agreement had an immediate impact on player salaries, increasing wages for the 1993 season by 38 percent.

The CBA agreed to in 1993 was extended by the agreement of players and owners in 1998. This lasted until the 2002 season, when the CBA was extended through the 2006 season.

== 2006 agreement ==
The CBA agreed upon in 1993 was extended again in 2006 after the team owners agreed to include more revenues in the salary cap and to increase benefits, including the first ever plan to provide funds to players for medical expenses after their post-career medical insurance ran out. This extension of the CBA included an option for either party to opt out before November 8, 2008, which would have resulted in a termination of the CBA on March 1, 2011 if either side chose to exercise it. The team owners voted unanimously to opt out in May 2008.

== 2011 agreement ==
Negotiations for a new CBA began in early 2010. Team owners and new NFL Commissioner Roger Goodell demanded a cutback in salaries and benefits under the cap system, promising to lockout the players if no new agreement was reached by March 1, 2011. The NFLPA rejected Goodell's proposal, requesting to see all league and club financial records to determine what need, if any, the clubs had for a decrease in player costs. The players voted during their 2010 team meetings to end the NFLPA's status as a labor union as of March 1, 2011, unless a new CBA was reached by that time. Although there was no salary cap in 2010, free agency activity and overall expenditures on players declined, leading the NFLPA to file a collusion case, claiming that the owners had unlawfully agreed to reduce competition for free agents. After failing to make any progress in negotiations, both sides accepted mediation under the auspices of the Federal Mediation and Conciliation Service (FMCS) in February 2011. During mediation, players and owners agreed to extend the 2006 CBA by one week. The FMCS failed to mediate a settlement and the previous CBA expired on March 7, 2011. That same day, the NFLPA announced it was no longer a union. This allowed players to file individual antitrust cases, many of which challenged the legality of the impending lockout. Tom Brady of the New England Patriots and Peyton Manning of the Indianapolis Colts were two of the eight named plaintiffs in the action filed in Federal District Court in Minnesota.

The Federal District Court initially ruled for the players, declaring the lockout illegal because the players were no longer members of a union. The 8th Circuit Court of Appeals stayed the District Court's ruling, and the lockout continued pending a final determination in the appellate court. In July 2011, as court-ordered mediation continued between players and owners in New York, at the offices of the NFL's lawyers, the 8th Circuit court announced that the Norris–La Guardia Act prohibited it from enjoining the lockout. The court stated in its decision that the ruling only applied to veteran players under contract, and not to unsigned rookies or veteran free agents.

After several months of negotiations, the longest lockout in league history ended on July 25, 2011 following a tentative litigation settlement which reclassified some league revenues for cap purposes. This settlement allowed team owners to keep a small percentage from being included in future salary caps. The settlement was conditional upon the NFLPA re-constituting as a union and incorporating the settlement terms into a new CBA. Players reported to training camps in July 2011, and voted to re-constitute the NFLPA as a union. After the vote tally was confirmed on July 31, 2011, the NFLPA began six days of bargaining that resulted in a new CBA being signed on August 5, 2011.

The key features of the 2011 CBA included changes related to health and safety, including a reduction in the number of off-season practices, a prohibition against training camp “two-a days", and a limit on contact practices in both the preseason and regular season. The new CBA also featured increases in player benefits, including retroactive pension increases for retired players and the creation of a neuro-cognitive benefit for players affected by concussions and other similar injuries. Also, the agreement promised an increase up to $1.5 million in salary guarantees for injured players and a new revenue split, offering players between 47 percent and 48.5 percent of all revenue. Changes were also made in contract-related benefits, with an increase in minimum player salaries[19] and salary cap minimums, including the guarantee of a 99% -95% league wide spend and a requirement that each club would have to spend an average of 89% of the salary cap over four-year periods.

A new rookie salary system was implemented by the NFL to limit spending on first-round draft picks, but the savings were reallocated to veteran players. The 2011 CBA has no opt-out clause and a ten-year term set to expire after the 2020 season.

== 2020 agreement ==
NFL owners voted to approve the 2020–2030 CBA on February 20, 2020. The Board of Representatives for the NFL Players Association approved a vote of the proposed CBA from the NFL owners on February 26, 2020, that went to a vote of the members of the Players Association. The new CBA was agreed to by the NFLPA on March 15, 2020.

In the 2020 agreement, a 17th regular season game for teams would be added to the NFL schedule during the 2021 NFL season and the playoffs would be expanded from 12 to 14 teams beginning in the 2020 season. After owners voted to expand the playoffs on April 2, 2020, playoff-eligible teams increased from 12 teams to 14 teams, with six Wild Card playoff games being played instead of four and only two teams receiving first-round playoff byes instead of four. The preseason will be shortened from four games to three in seasons with 17 regular season games.

The regular season active roster expanded to up to 55 players (from a 53-player limit), with the one or two extra spots only eligible for practice squad players elevated just for the regular season game. These practice squad players revert to the practice squad once the game is over. The gameday roster limit increased from 46 players to 48, with a minimum of eight players being offensive linemen. If fewer than eight offensive linemen are active, the gameday roster limit decreases to 47.

The practice squad player limit in the 2020 and 2021 seasons is 12 players, which increases to 14 in 2022. Practice squad eligibility for players was increased, with a maximum of two players per team allowed to have an unlimited number of accrued seasons. This increases to four players per team for the 2022–2030 league years.

Violations of the NFL's substance abuse policy no longer can result in a player suspension. Players receive 48% of the NFL revenue by the 2021 season, and at least 48.8% of the revenue in any 17-game NFL season. NFL teams may only use either the franchise tag or transition tag in a given season, instead of being able to use both as in the previous CBA. Players are eligible for pensions after three accrued seasons, down from four previously.

A "neutral decision-maker" will now replace the NFL Commissioner on ruling in most discipline cases.

Creation of new four-year player benefit: up to an additional $1.25M in salary excluded from the cap for up to two players.

Fifth-year options for first round picks become fully guaranteed if chosen by a team. In addition, the fifth year option salary can rise based on the player's performance in his first three seasons. Previously, it was only tied to when the player was selected in the draft.

NFL will also improve teams' training facilities and establish a network of hospitals in teams' home cities with free healthcare for current and former players.
