= 2007 Seattle Seahawks season =

American football team season

- Owner: Paul Allen
- General manager: Tim Ruskell
- Head coach: Mike Holmgren
- Offensive coordinator: Gil Haskell
- Defensive coordinator: John Marshall
- Home stadium: Qwest Field

Results
- Record: 10–6
- Division place: 1st NFC West
- Playoffs: Won Wild Card Playoffs (vs. Redskins) 35–14; Lost Divisional Playoffs (at Packers) 20–42
- All-Pros: 3: OT Walter Jones (1st team); DE Patrick Kerney (1st team); LB Lofa Tatupu (1st team)
- Pro Bowlers: 6: QB Matt Hasselbeck; OT Walter Jones; DE Patrick Kerney; LB Julian Peterson; LB Lofa Tatupu; CB Marcus Trufant

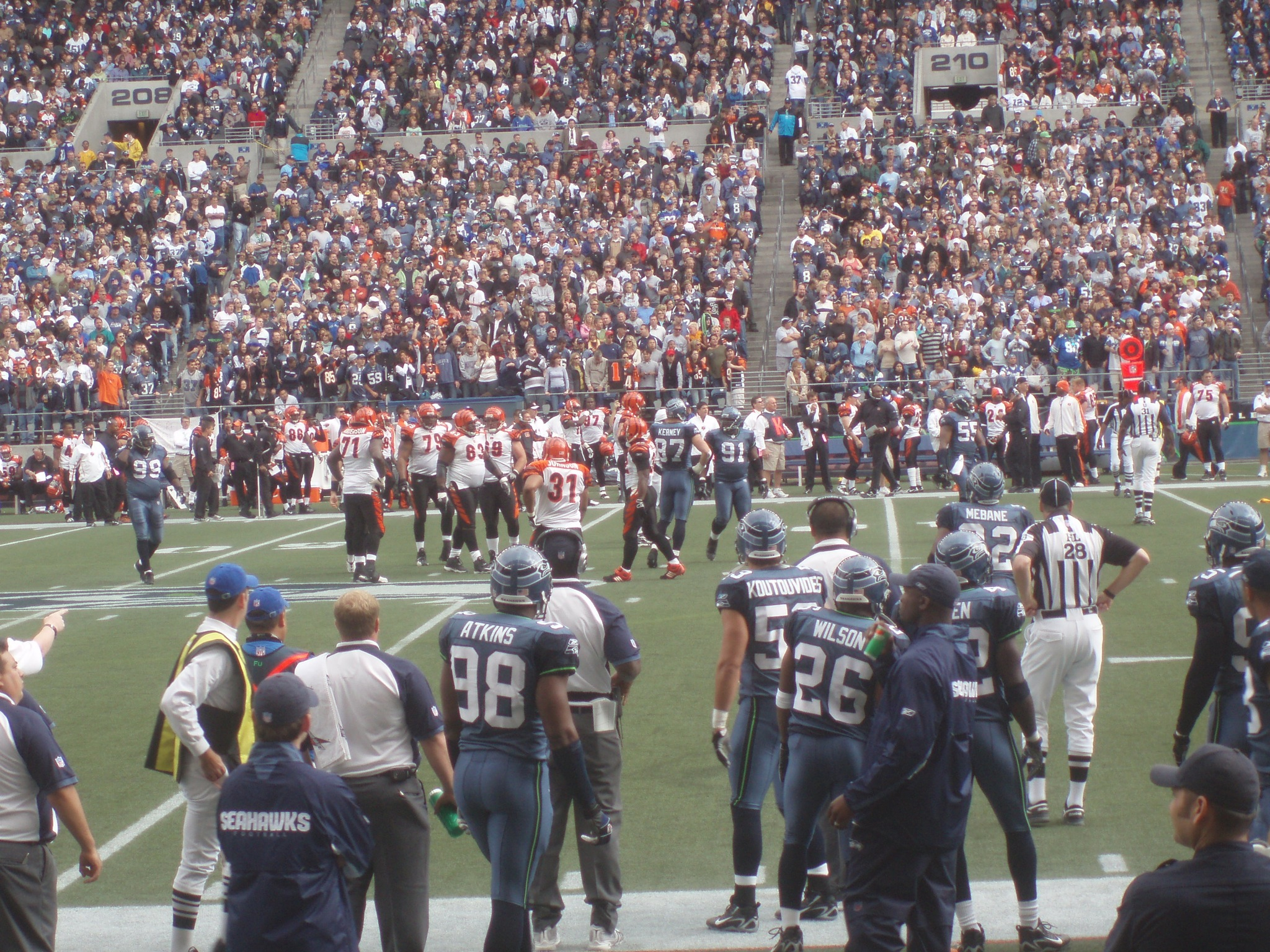
The Seahawks host the Cincinnati Bengals in week 3, September 23

The 2007 Seattle Seahawks season was the franchise's 32nd season in the National Football League (NFL), sixth season in Qwest Field and the ninth under head coach Mike Holmgren. The team improved on their 9–7 record in 2006 and secured its fourth consecutive NFC West division title and its fifth consecutive playoff appearance. Also, the team set an NFL record for the fewest penalties since the NFL expanded to a 16-game season, with 59. In the playoffs, the Seahawks defeated the Washington Redskins in the wild card round, but fell to Holmgren's former team, the Green Bay Packers, in the divisional round.

Pro Football Reference argued that the 2007 Seahawks gained the easiest schedule of any 21st century NFL team: they never opposed any team with a better record than 10–6 in any of their sixteen regular season encounters, and played only two opponents with that record. Divisional matchups had the NFC West playing the NFC South and the AFC North, whilst based on common positions from 2006 the Seahawks also opposed the Chicago Bears and the Philadelphia Eagles – both of whom fell to last in stronger divisions.

Punt returner Nate Burleson broke the Seahawks single season punt return yardage record this season with 658 yards.

== 2007 NFL draft ==
The 2007 NFL draft took place on April 28–29, with the Seahawks picking 55th overall (2nd round), selecting Cornerback Josh Wilson.

2007 Seattle Seahawks draft
Round	Selection	Player	Position	College	Notes
2	55	Josh Wilson	Cornerback	Maryland	
3	85	Brandon Mebane	Defensive Tackle	California	
4	120	Baraka Atkins	Defensive End	Miami (Florida)	
4	124	Mansfield Wrotto	Guard	Georgia Tech	
5	161	Will Herring	Linebacker	Auburn	
6	197	Courtney Taylor	Wide Receiver	Auburn	
6	210	Jordan Kent	Wide Receiver	Oregon	
7	232	Steve Vallos	Guard	Wake Forest	

== Coaching staff and roster ==
=== Coaching staff ===
Head coach Mike Holmgren entered his ninth year with the Seahawks. It is the second to last year on his existing contract.

The Seahawks hired former Atlanta Falcons head coach Jim L. Mora to be the new defensive backs coach and assistant coach to Mike Holmgren. A former player at the University of Washington, Mora is considered a hometown guy.

The new special teams coach was Bruce DeHaven. His previous position was as the special teams coach for the Dallas Cowboys.

== Personnel ==
=== Staff / Coaches ===
2007 Seattle Seahawks staff
Front Office: Chairman – Paul Allen; President / Chief Executive Officer (CEO) - Tod Leiweke; President of Football Operations – Tim Ruskell; Executive Vice President of Football Operations/General Manager – Mike Holmgren; Senior Vice President – Mike Reinfeldt; Vice President of Football Operations – Ted Thompson; General Manager - Bob Ferguson; Director of Player Personnel – John Schneider; Director of Pro Personnel – Will Lewis; Assistant Director of Player Personnel / Pro Scout - Lake Dawson; Director of College Scouting (Eastern Region) – Scott Fitterer; Director of College Scouting (Western Region) – Mike Phair; Scouting Assistant - Chris Culmer; Football Operations Coordinator / Team Travel - Bill Nayes; Chief Financial Officer - Martha Fuller; Head Coaches: Head Coach – Mike Holmgren; Assistant Head Coach/Defensive Backs Coach – Jim L. Mora; Area Scout - Scott Fitterer	Offensive Coaches: Offensive Coordinator – Gil Haskell; Quarterbacks – Jim Zorn; Running Backs – Stump Mitchell; Wide Receivers – Nolan Cromwell; Tight Ends – Jim Lind; Offensive Line - Bill Laveroni; Quality Control / Offensive Assistant – Gary Reynolds; Assistant Offensive Line - Keith Gilbertson; Defensive Coaches: Defensive Coordinator – John Marshall; Senior Defensive Assistant / Special Projects Coach - Ray Rhodes; Defensive Line – Dwaine Board; Defensive Quality Control - Tom Headlee; Linebackers – Zerick Rollins; Defensive Backs – Jim L. Mora; Assistant Defensive Backs / Secondary - Larry Marmie; Special Teams Coaches: Special Teams Coordinator – Bruce DeHaven; Special Teams Assistant - John Jamison; Strength and Conditioning: Strength and Conditioning – Mike Clark; Assistant Strength and Conditioning – Darren Krein; Summer Intern Athletic Trainer - Jon Boone; Intern - Terrell Williams

=== Final roster ===
2007 Seattle Seahawks roster
Quarterbacks (QB): 5 Charlie Frye; 8 Matt Hasselbeck; 15 Seneca Wallace; Running backs (RB): 37 Shaun Alexander; 34 David Kirtman FB; 20 Maurice Morris; 33 Josh Scobey; 43 Leonard Weaver FB; Wide receivers (WR): 83 Deion Branch; 81 Nate Burleson; 84 Bobby Engram; 18 D. J. Hackett; 87 Ben Obomanu; 86 Courtney Taylor; Tight ends (TE): 85 Will Heller; 47 Bennie Joppru; 88 Marcus Pollard	Offensive linemen (OL): 68 Tom Ashworth T; 62 Chris Gray G; 71 Walter Jones T; 75 Sean Locklear T; 67 Rob Sims G; 65 Chris Spencer C; 74 Ray Willis G/T; 77 Floyd Womack G/T; 66 Mansfield Wrotto G; Defensive linemen (DL): 98 Baraka Atkins DE; 52 Jason Babin DE; 99 Rocky Bernard DT; 94 Howard Green DT; 97 Patrick Kerney DE; 92 Brandon Mebane DT; 55 Darryl Tapp DE; 93 Craig Terrill DT; 95 Ellis Wyms DE/DT	Linebackers (LB): 57 Kevin Bentley OLB; 54 Will Herring OLB; 56 Leroy Hill OLB; 53 Niko Koutouvides MLB; 50 Lance Laury OLB; 59 Julian Peterson OLB; 51 Lofa Tatupu MLB; Defensive backs (DB): 27 Jordan Babineaux CB/S; 24 Deon Grant SS; 42 Mike Green SS; 32 Kevin Hobbs CB; 21 Kelly Jennings CB; 25 Brian Russell FS; 23 Marcus Trufant CB; 26 Josh Wilson CB; Special teams (ST): 3 Josh Brown K; 1 Ryan Plackemeier P; 49 Jeff Robinson LS	Practice squad: 31 Wale Dada CB; 44 Cameron Jensen LB; 82 Jordan Kent WR; 46 Joe Newton TE; 19 Logan Payne WR; 72 Nuʻu Tafisi DE; 69 Steve Vallos T; 78 Kyle Williams T; Reserve: 91 Chuck Darby DT (IR); 36 Alvin Pearman (IR); 38 Mack Strong FB (IR); 90 Marcus Tubbs DT (IR); 39 C. J. Wallace S (IR); Rookies in italics 53 active, 5 reserve, 8 practice squad

=== Team captains ===
For the 2007 season, the NFL has allowed permanent captains for each team to wear a "C" patch on their right shoulder. The patch is in team colors with four stars under the "C". A gold star is placed on a bar below the "C" signaling how many years (with a maximum of four years) that player has been captain. For the Seahawks, the team captains are:

- Matt Hasselbeck
- Lofa Tatupu
- Mack Strong
- Deon Grant
- Josh Brown
- Niko Koutouvides

=== Departures ===
- Defensive end Grant Wistrom instead of having his contract renegotiated following the 2006 season decided to retire.
- Wide Receiver Darrell Jackson was traded to the San Francisco 49ers for the 120th pick in the 4th round of the 2007 NFL draft.
- Tight end Jerramy Stevens was released following a DUI arrest in Arizona, later he signed with the Tampa Bay Buccaneers.
- Tight end Itula Mili was released in January to make room for wide receiver Ben Obomanu.
- Center Robbie Tobeck retired the day after the loss in the 2006 NFC Divisional Playoff game against the Chicago Bears.

=== Arrivals ===
- Defensive end Patrick Kerney signed with the Seahawks after being with the Atlanta Falcons.
- Safeties Deon Grant and Brian Russell signed with Seahawks after being with the Jacksonville Jaguars and Cleveland Browns.

== Schedule ==
=== Preseason ===
Week	Date	Opponent	Result	Record	Game site	Recap
1	August 12	at San Diego Chargers	**W** 24–16	1–0	Qualcomm Stadium	Recap
2	August 18	at Green Bay Packers	**L** 13–48	1–1	Lambeau Field	Recap
3	August 25	Minnesota Vikings	**W** 30–13	2–1	Qwest Field	Recap
4	August 30	Oakland Raiders	**W** 19–14	3–1	Qwest Field	Recap

=== Regular season ===
Week	Date	Opponent	Result	Record	Game site	Recap
1	September 9	Tampa Bay Buccaneers	**W** 20–6	1–0	Qwest Field	Recap
2	September 16	at **Arizona Cardinals**	**L** 20–23	1–1	University of Phoenix Stadium	Recap
3	September 23	Cincinnati Bengals	**W** 24–21	2–1	Qwest Field	Recap
4	September 30	at **San Francisco 49ers**	**W** 23–3	3–1	Candlestick Park	Recap
5	October 7	at Pittsburgh Steelers	**L** 0–21	3–2	Heinz Field	Recap
6	October 14	New Orleans Saints	**L** 17–28	3–3	Qwest Field	Recap
7	October 21	**St. Louis Rams**	**W** 33–6	4–3	Qwest Field	Recap
8	Bye					
9	November 4	at Cleveland Browns	**L** 30–33 (OT)	4–4	Cleveland Browns Stadium	Recap
10	November 12	**San Francisco 49ers**	**W** 24–0	5–4	Qwest Field	Recap
11	November 18	Chicago Bears	**W** 30–23	6–4	Qwest Field	Recap
12	November 25	at **St. Louis Rams**	**W** 24–19	7–4	Edward Jones Dome	Recap
13	December 2	at Philadelphia Eagles	**W** 28–24	8–4	Lincoln Financial Field	Recap
14	December 9	**Arizona Cardinals**	**W** 42–21	9–4	Qwest Field	Recap
15	December 16	at Carolina Panthers	**L** 10–13	9–5	Bank of America Stadium	Recap
16	December 23	Baltimore Ravens	**W** 27–6	10–5	Qwest Field	Recap
17	December 30	at Atlanta Falcons	**L** 41–44	10–6	Georgia Dome	Recap

Bold indicates division opponents.
Source: 2007 NFL season results

=== Postseason ===
Round	Date	Opponent (seed)	Result	Record	Game site	Recap
Wild Card	January 5, 2008	Washington Redskins (6)	**W** 35–14	1–0	Qwest Field	Recap
Divisional	January 12, 2008	at Green Bay Packers (2)	**L** 20–42	1–1	Lambeau Field	Recap

== Standings ==
NFC West
	W	L	T	PCT	DIV	CONF	PF	PA	STK
^{(3)} Seattle Seahawks	10	6	0	.625	5–1	8–4	393	291	L1
Arizona Cardinals	8	8	0	.500	3–3	5–7	404	399	W2
San Francisco 49ers	5	11	0	.313	3–3	4–8	219	364	L1
St. Louis Rams	3	13	0	.188	1–5	3–9	263	438	L4

== Game summaries ==
=== Preseason ===
==== Week P1: at San Diego Chargers ====
Preseason Week One: Seattle Seahawks at San Diego Chargers – Game summary

Quarter	1	2	3	4	Total
Seahawks	7	0	0	17	24
Chargers	0	7	6	3	16

at Qualcomm Stadium, San Diego, California

- Date: August 12
- Game time: 5:07pm local
- Game weather: clear, 73 °F (23 °C), 64% humidity, wind WSW 8 miles per hour (13 km/h)
- Game attendance: 57,500
- Referee: Mike Carey
- TV: NBC
- Gamecenter, Gamebook

==== Week P2: at Green Bay Packers ====
Preseason Week Two: Seattle Seahawks at Green Bay Packers – Game summary

Quarter	1	2	3	4	Total
Seahawks	3	7	3	0	13
Packers	10	28	10	0	48

at Lambeau Field, Green Bay, Wisconsin

- Date: August 18
- Game time: 7:06pm local
- Game weather: rain, 59 °F (15 °C), 93% humidity, wind ESE 4 miles per hour (6.4 km/h)
- Game attendance: 69,761
- Referee: John Parry
- TV: KING
- Gamecenter, Gamebook

==== Week P3: vs. Minnesota Vikings ====
Preseason Week Three: Seattle Seahawks vs. Minnesota Vikings – Game summary

Quarter	1	2	3	4	Total
Vikings	0	10	3	0	13
Seahawks	6	10	7	7	30

at Qwest Field, Seattle

- Date: August 25
- Game time: 6:07pm local
- Game weather: partly cloudy, 68 °F (20 °C), 65% humidity, wind SE 5 miles per hour (8.0 km/h)
- Game attendance: 66,723
- Referee: Larry Nemmers
- TV: KING
- Gamecenter, Gamebook

==== Week P4: vs. Oakland Raiders ====
Preseason Week Four: Seattle Seahawks vs. Oakland Raiders – Game summary

Quarter	1	2	3	4	Total
Raiders	7	0	7	0	14
Seahawks	3	9	0	7	19

at Qwest Field, Seattle

- Date: August 30
- Game time: 7:08pm local
- Game weather: clear, 76 °F (24 °C), 47% humidity, wind NNW 7 miles per hour (11 km/h)
- Game attendance: 66,700
- Referee: Ed Hochuli
- TV: KING
- Gamecenter, Gamebook

=== Regular season ===
==== Week 1: vs. Tampa Bay Buccaneers ====
Week One: Seattle Seahawks vs. Tampa Bay Buccaneers – Game summary

Quarter	1	2	3	4	Total
Buccaneers	6	0	0	0	6
Seahawks	0	10	0	10	20

at Qwest Field, Seattle

- Date: September 9
- Game time: 1:15pm local
- Game weather: clear, 67 °F (19 °C), 51% humidity, wind N 12 miles per hour (19 km/h)
- Game attendance: 68,044
- Referee: Larry Nemmers
- TV announcers (Fox): Dick Stockton & Brian Baldinger
- Gamecenter, Gamebook

Game information

First quarter

- TB – Matt Bryant 38-yard field goal, 8:56. Buccaneers 3–0. Drive: 6 plays, 55 yards, 3:35.
- TB – Matt Bryant 32-yard field goal, 0:00. Buccaneers 6–0. Drive: 10 plays, 76 yards, 5:56.

Second quarter

- SEA – Josh Brown 28-yard field goal, 2:39. Buccaneers 6–3. Drive: 11 plays, 69 yards, 4:03.
- SEA – Shaun Alexander 1-yard run (Josh Brown kick), 0:50. Seahawks 10–6. Drive: 3 plays, 14 yards, 0:45.

Third quarter

- No scoring plays.

Fourth quarter

- SEA – Josh Brown 46-yard field goal, 14:09. Seahawks 13–6. Drive: 9 plays, 52 yards, 4:21.
- SEA – Maurice Morris 34-yard pass from Matt Hasselbeck (Josh Brown kick), 7:55. Seahawks 20–6. Drive: 7 plays, 70 yards, 4:13.

Top passers

- TB – Jeff Garcia: 19/27, 201 yds
- SEA – Matt Hasselbeck: 17/24, 222 yds, 1 TD, 0 INT

Top rushers

- TB – Cadillac Williams: 12 car, 60 yds
- SEA – Shaun Alexander: 27 car, 105 yds, 1 TD

Top receivers

- TB – Joey Galloway: 5 rec, 72 yds
- SEA – Bobby Engram: 3 rec, 64 yds

Team – pass – rush – total – to

- TB – 194 – 90 – 284 – 2
- SEA – 204 – 139 – 343 – 1

The Seahawks began the 2007 campaign at home against its 1976 expansion mate, the Tampa Bay Buccaneers. In the first quarter, Seattle trailed early as Buccaneers kicker Matt Bryant kicked 38-yard and 32-yard field goals. In the second quarter, Seahawks kicker Josh Brown nailed a 28-yard field goal, then the Seahawks took the lead when running back Shaun Alexander powered in for a 1-yard touchdown run. After a scoreless third quarter, Seattle sealed the victory with Brown's 46-yard field goal and a 34-yard touchdown pass from quarterback Matt Hasselbeck to running back Maurice Morris.

With the win, the Seahawks began a season at 1–0 for the fourth time in the past five years.

==== Week 2: at Arizona Cardinals ====
Week Two: Seattle Seahawks at Arizona Cardinals – Game summary

Quarter	1	2	3	4	Total
Seahawks	0	7	10	3	20
Cardinals	3	14	0	6	23

at University of Phoenix Stadium, Glendale, Arizona

- Date: September 16
- Game time: 1:05pm local
- Game weather: indoors
- Game attendance: 64,542
- Referee: Ron Winter
- TV announcers (Fox): Chris Rose & Terry Donahue
- Gamecenter, Gamebook

Game information

First quarter

- ARI – Neil Rackers 28-yard field goal, 1:27. Cardinals 3–0. Drive: 6 plays, 21 yards, 3:05.

Second quarter

- ARI – Leonard Pope 30-yard pass from Matt Leinart (Neil Rackers kick), 14:07. Cardinals 10–0. Drive: 4 plays, 70 yards, 1:45.
- ARI – Edgerrin James 17-yard run (Neil Rackers kick), 5:43. Cardinals 17–0. Drive: 5 plays, 38 yards, 3:31.
- SEA – Nate Burleson 24-yard pass from Matt Hasselbeck (Josh Brown kick), 1:16. Cardinals 17–7. Drive: 10 plays, 80 yards, 4:27.

Third quarter

- SEA – Shaun Alexander 16-yard run (Josh Brown kick), 8:42. Cardinals 17–14. Drive: 8 plays, 52 yards, 3:13.
- SEA – Josh Brown 28-yard field goal, 3:34. Tied 17–17. Drive: 8 plays, 51 yards, 2:41.

Fourth quarter

- SEA – Josh Brown 28-yard field goal, 9:52. Seahawks 20–17. Drive: 9 plays, 78 yards, 4:19.
- ARI – Neil Rackers 52-yard field goal, 4:44. Tied 20–20. Drive: 9 plays, 46 yards, 5:08.
- ARI – Neil Rackers 42-yard field goal, 0:01. Cardinals 23–20. Drive: 5 plays, 22 yards, 1:47.

Top passers

- SEA – Matt Hasselbeck: 22/36, 281 yds, 1 TD
- ARI – Matt Leinart: 23/37, 299 yds, 1 TD, 1 INT

Top rushers

- SEA – Shaun Alexander: 18 car, 70 yds, 1 TD
- ARI – Edgerrin James: 24 car, 128 yds, 1 TD

Top receivers

- SEA – Deion Branch: 7 rec, 122 yds
- ARI – Larry Fitzgerald: 7 rec, 87 yds

Team – pass – rush – total – to

- SEA – 278 – 84 – 362 – 1
- ARI – 299 – 132 – 431 – 1

Hoping to build off of their home win over the Buccaneers, the Seahawks flew to the University of Phoenix Stadium for a Week 2 divisional duel with the Arizona Cardinals. Running back Shaun Alexander sported a cast on his left wrist, the result of a reported sprain suffered in the opening week. In the first quarter, Seattle trailed early as kicker Neil Rackers booted a 28-yard field goal for the only score of the period. In the second quarter, the Seahawks continued to trail as Cardinals quarterback Matt Leinart threw a 30-yard touchdown pass to tight end Leonard Pope, along with running back Edgerrin James getting a 17-yard touchdown run. Down 17–0, the Seahawks would respond just before halftime with quarterback Matt Hasselbeck completing a 24-yard touchdown pass to wide receiver Nate Burleson. Arizona quickly moved into field goal range after the Seahawks touchdown, but Rackers hit the upright from 53 yards as time expired.

In the third quarter, Seattle would come all the way back to tie the game after running back Shaun Alexander finally broke loose for a 16-yard touchdown run and kicker Josh Brown booted a 28-yard field goal. In the fourth quarter, the Seahawks took the lead with Brown kicking another 28-yard field goal. However, Arizona rallied to tie the game on a Rackers 52-yard field goal. The Seahawks appeared to be driving for the go-ahead score when, inside field goal range in the final 2 minutes, an exchange from Hasselbeck to Alexander was fumbled and recovered by the Cardinals. Arizona then drove to the Seahawks' 25-yard line, where Rackers kicked a game-winning 42-yard field goal with 11 seconds left.

With the loss, the Seahawks fell to 1–1 on the young season, and had lost four straight divisional games.

==== Week 3: vs. Cincinnati Bengals ====
Week Three: Seattle Seahawks vs. Cincinnati Bengals – Game summary

Quarter	1	2	3	4	Total
Bengals	7	3	2	9	21
Seahawks	7	7	0	10	24

at Qwest Field, Seattle

- Date: September 23
- Game time: 1:05pm local
- Game weather: cloudy, 54 °F (12 °C), 78% humidity, wind calm
- Game attendance: 68,110
- Referee: Ed Hochuli
- TV announcers (CBS): Gus Johnson & Steve Tasker
- Gamecenter, Gamebook

Game information

First quarter

- SEA – Bobby Engram 18-yard pass from Matt Hasselbeck (Josh Brown kick), 13:31. Seahawks 7–0. Drive: 3 plays, 24 yards, 1:29.
- CIN – T. J. Houshmandzadeh 35-yard pass from Carson Palmer (Shayne Graham kick), 6:18. Tied 7–7. Drive: 14 plays, 83 yards, 7:13.

Second quarter

- CIN – Shayne Graham 43-yard field goal, 10:20. Bengals 10–7. Drive: 6 plays, 43 yards, 2:43.
- SEA – Deion Branch 42-yard pass from Matt Hasselbeck (Josh Brown kick), 2:06. Seahawks 14–10. Drive: 3 plays, 69 yards, 1:00.

Third quarter

- CIN – Safety, Lemar Marshall sacked Matt Hasselbeck in end zone, 11:19. Seahawks 14–12.

Fourth quarter

- CIN – Shayne Graham 24-yard field goal, 9:57. Bengals 15–14. Drive: 11 plays, 38 yards, 4:50.
- SEA – Josh Brown 23-yard field goal, 6:00. Seahawks 17–15. Drive: 9 plays, 64 yards, 3:57.
- CIN – Kenny Watson 8-yard run (run failed), 2:42. Bengals 21–17. Drive: 7 plays, 68 yards, 3:18.
- SEA – Nate Burleson 22-yard pass from Matt Hasselbeck (Josh Brown kick), 1:00. Seahawks 24–21. Drive: 7 plays, 60 yards, 1:42.

Top passers

- CIN – Carson Palmer: 27/43, 342 yds, 1 TD, 2 INT
- SEA – Matt Hasselbeck: 24/37, 248 yds, 3 TD, 2 INT

Top rushers

- CIN – Kenny Watson: 9 car, 60 yds, 1 TD
- SEA – Shaun Alexander: 21 car, 100 yds

Top receivers

- CIN – T. J. Houshmandzadeh: 12 rec, 141 yds, 1 TD
- SEA – Deion Branch: 6 rec, 77 yds, 1 TD

Team – pass – rush – total – to

- CIN – 328 – 84 – 412 – 4
- SEA –238 – 102 – 340 – 2

Things got off to a quick start for the Seahawks as rookie Josh Wilson returned the opening kickoff 72 yards to the Bengals 24-yard line. Three plays later, Matt Hasselbeck hit wide receiver Bobby Engram for an 18-yard touchdown and a 7–0 Seahawks lead. The Bengals were quick to respond, as Bengals quarterback Carson Palmer hit six of his first seven pass attempts for 90 yards, culminating with an 18-yard touchdown pass to wide receiver T. J. Houshmandzadeh and evening the score at 7–7. After turnovers by each team, Cincinnati kicker Shayne Graham converted a 43-yard field goal attempt to give the Bengals a 10–7 lead 80 seconds into the second quarter. With 3:06 left in the first half, Seahawks defensive lineman Chartric Darby's heavy pressure on Palmer led to a Deon Grant interception at the Seattle 31-yard line. A few plays later, Hasselbeck hit Deion Branch with a 42-yard touchdown pass and a 14–10 Seahawks lead at halftime.

3:51 into the third quarter, Cincinnati linebacker Lemar Marshall sacked Hasselbeck in the endzone for a safety, cutting the lead to 14–12. Neither team scored again until there was 9:57 left in the game when Graham booted a 24-yard field goal to give Cincinnati its first lead of the second half at 15–14. On the next possession, Hasselbeck moved the Seahawks to the opposition's 6-yard line. Wide receiver Nate Burleson was unable to hold on to a pass in the endzone, and the Seahawks settled for a kicker Josh Brown field goal, reclaiming the lead at 17–15. Palmer then connected with Chad Johnson on two big pass plays late in the fourth quarter, followed by two runs by back-up running back Kenny Watson for a Bengals touchdown. Cincinnati opted to try a 2-point conversion, but cornerback Jordan Babineaux stopped Watson after a pitch from Palmer. The Bengals led 21–17 when the Seahawks got the ball with 2:42 left in the game. The Seahawks sputtered near mid-field, and faced 4th and 1. Running back Shaun Alexander broke through for 22 yards, and Hasselbeck hit Nate Burleson with a 22-yard touchdown pass on the next play for a 24–21 lead with 1:00 left. Seahawks linebacker Lance Laury forced a fumble during the ensuing kickoff, with free safety Deon Grant recovering for Seattle. Two plays later Alexander ran for a first down (and 100 yards on the game), cementing the Seahawks victory and improving their record to 2–1.

==== Week 4: at San Francisco 49ers ====
Week Four: Seattle Seahawks at San Francisco 49ers – Game summary

Quarter	1	2	3	4	Total
Seahawks	0	13	7	3	23
49ers	0	0	3	0	3

at Monster Park, San Francisco

- Date: September 30
- Game time: 1:05pm local
- Game weather: clear, 65 °F (18 °C), 57% humidity, wind WSW 12 miles per hour (19 km/h)
- Game attendance: 67,651
- Referee: Mike Carey
- TV announcers (Fox): Kenny Albert, Daryl Johnston & Tony Siragusa
- Gamecenter, Gamebook

Game information

First quarter

- No scoring plays.

Second quarter

- SEA – Josh Brown 23-yard field goal, 12:55. Seahawks 3–0. Drive: 11 plays, 52 yards, 5:29.
- SEA – Bobby Engram 17-yard pass from Matt Hasselbeck (Josh Brown kick), 6:10. Seahawks 10–0. Drive: 2 plays, 82 yards, 0:51.
- SEA – Josh Brown 31-yard field goal, 0:57. Seahawks 13–0. Drive: 8 plays, 68 yards, 2:31.

Third quarter

- SEA – Marcus Pollard 14-yard pass from Matt Hasselbeck (Josh Brown kick), 12:11. Seahawks 20–0. Drive: 6 plays, 44 yards, 2:37.
- SF – Joe Nedney 43-yard field goal, 4:36. Seahawks 20–3. Drive: 6 plays, 26 yards, 1:44.

Fourth quarter

- SEA – Josh Brown 25-yard field goal, 14:49. Seahawks 23–3. Drive: 7 plays, 17 yards, 1:31.

Top passers

- SEA – Matt Hasselbeck: 23/31, 281 yds, 2 TD, 1 INT
- SF – Trent Dilfer: 12/33, 128 yds, 2 INT

Top rushers

- SEA – Shaun Alexander: 25 car, 78 yds
- SF – Frank Gore: 16 car, 79 yds

Top receivers

- SEA – Deion Branch: 7 rec, 130 yds
- SF – Frank Gore: 3 rec, 42 yds

Team – pass – rush – total – to

- SEA – 278 – 93 – 371 – 1
- SF – 75 – 109 – 184 – 3

Coming off their home win over the Bengals, the Seahawks flew to Monster Park for an NFC West duel with the San Francisco 49ers. After a scoreless first quarter, the Seahawks took flight in the second quarter with kicker Josh Brown getting a 23-yard field goal, along with quarterback Matt Hasselbeck completing a 17-yard touchdown pass to wide receiver Bobby Engram. Seattle ended the half with Brown kicking a 31-yard field goal.

In the third quarter, the Seahawks went back to work with Hasselbeck completing a 14-yard touchdown pass to tight end Marcus Pollard. The 49ers got their only score of the game with kicker Joe Nedney getting a 43-yard field goal. In the fourth quarter, Seattle wrapped up the game with Brown nailing a 25-yard field goal.

With their first divisional win in five games, the Seahawks improved to 3–1. Fullback Mack Strong played in his 200th game as a Seahawk, becoming only the second player to do so.

==== Week 5: at Pittsburgh Steelers ====
Week Five: Seattle Seahawks at Pittsburgh Steelers – Game summary

Quarter	1	2	3	4	Total
Seahawks	0	0	0	0	0
Steelers	0	7	7	7	21

at Heinz Field, Pittsburgh, Pennsylvania

- Date: October 7
- Game time: 1:02pm local
- Game weather: partly cloudy, 80 °F (27 °C), 59% humidity, wind WSW 2 miles per hour (3.2 km/h)
- Game attendance: 64,478
- Referee: Terry McAulay
- TV announcers (Fox): Joe Buck & Troy Aikman
- Gamecenter, Gamebook

Game information

First quarter

- No scoring plays.

Second quarter

- PIT – Heath Miller 13-yard pass from Ben Roethlisberger (Jeff Reed kick), 1:56. Steelers 7–0. Drive: 8 plays, 68 yards, 4:49.

Third quarter

- PIT – Najeh Davenport 1-yard run (Jeff Reed kick), 4:43. Steelers 14–0. Drive: 17 plays, 80 yards, 10:17.

Fourth quarter

- PIT – Najeh Davenport 5-yard run (Jeff Reed kick), 10:06. Steelers 21–0. Drive: 13 plays, 85 yards, 8:06.

Top passers

- SEA – Matt Hasselbeck: 13/27, 116 yds, 1 INT
- PIT – Ben Roethlisberger: 18/22, 206 yds, 1 TD

Top rushers

- SEA – Shaun Alexander: 11 car, 25 yds
- PIT – Willie Parker: 28 car, 102 yds

Top receivers

- SEA – Ben Obomanu: 2 rec, 38 yds
- PIT – Cedrick Wilson: 5 rec, 69 yds

Team – pass – rush – total – to

- SEA – 106 – 38 – 144 – 1
- PIT – 179 – 163 – 342 – 0

Coming off their easy divisional road win over the 49ers, the Seahawks flew to Heinz Field for a Week 5 interconference duel with the Pittsburgh Steelers, in the rematch of Super Bowl XL. However, Seattle was mostly unable to get any offensive rhythm going. Meanwhile, the Steelers ran up and down the field with quarterback Ben Roethlisberger's 13-yard touchdown pass to tight end Heath Miller and running back Najeh Davenport's 1-yard and 5-yard touchdown run.

With the loss, the Seahawks fell to 3–2. This would mark Seattle's first shut-out loss since Week 1 of the 2000 season, when the Seahawks lost to the Miami Dolphins 23–0. Head coach Mike Holmgren would suffer only his second career shutout loss.

==== Week 6: vs. New Orleans Saints ====
Week Six: Seattle Seahawks vs. New Orleans Saints – Game summary

Quarter	1	2	3	4	Total
Saints	7	21	0	0	28
Seahawks	0	10	0	7	17

at Qwest Field, Seattle

- Date: October 14
- Game time: 5:23pm local
- Game weather: clear, 68 °F (20 °C), 47% humidity, wind SW 4 miles per hour (6.4 km/h)
- Game attendance: 68,296
- Referee: Jeff Triplette
- TV announcers (NBC): Al Michaels & John Madden
- Gamecenter, Gamebook

Game information

First quarter

- NO – Pierre Thomas 5-yard defensive fumble return (Olindo Mare kick), 12:38. Saints 7–0.

Second quarter

- NO – Eric Johnson 3-yard pass from Drew Brees (Olindo Mare kick), 14:28. Saints 14–0. Drive: 13 plays, 86 yards, 7:04.
- NO – Lance Moore 7-yard run (Olindo Mare kick), 5:18. Saints 21–0. Drive: 6 plays, 66 yards, 2:48.
- SEA – Ben Obomanu 17-yard pass from Matt Hasselbeck (Josh Brown kick), 2:16. Saints 21–7. Drive: 7 plays, 63 yards, 3:02.
- NO – Marques Colston 2-yard pass from Drew Brees (Olindo Mare kick), 0:30. Saints 28–7. Drive: 9 plays, 80 yards, 1:46.
- SEA – Josh Brown 52-yard field goal, 0:02. Saints 28–10. Drive: 4 plays, 38 yards, 0:28.

Third quarter

- No scoring plays.

Fourth quarter

- SEA – Nate Burleson 22-yard pass from Matt Hasselbeck (Josh Brown kick), 6:39. Saints 28–17. Drive: 6 plays, 80 yards, 1:31.

Top passers

- NO – Drew Brees: 25/36, 246 yds, 2 TD
- SEA – Matt Hasselbeck: 26/43, 362 yds, 2 TD, 1 INT

Top rushers

- NO – Reggie Bush: 19 car, 97 yds
- SEA – Leonard Weaver: 3 car, 40 yds

Top receivers

- NO – David Patten: 8 rec, 113 yds
- SEA – Bobby Engram: 9 rec, 120 yds

Team – pass – rush – total – to

- NO – 246 – 121 – 367 – 1
- SEA – 333 – 92 – 425 – 2

Hoping to rebound from their road loss to the Steelers, the Seahawks went home for Sunday Night Football, as they hosted the winless New Orleans Saints. In the first quarter, Seattle trailed early as a blocked punt would result in New Orleans running back Pierre Thomas returning the loose ball 5 yards for a touchdown, along with the only score of the period. In the second quarter, the Seahawks continued to trail as Saints quarterback Drew Brees completed a 3-yard touchdown pass to tight end Eric Johnson, while wide receiver Lance Moore got a 7-yard touchdown run. The Seahawks would respond with quarterback Matt Hasselbeck completing a 17-yard touchdown pass to wide receiver Ben Obomanu. However, New Orleans went back to work with Brees completing a 2-yard touchdown pass to wide receiver Marques Colston. Seattle would end the half with kicker Josh Brown getting a 52-yard field goal. After a scoreless third quarter, the Seahawks tried to rally in the fourth quarter, but all they could get was Hasselbeck's 22-yard touchdown pass to wide receiver Nate Burleson.

With the loss, the Seahawks fell to 3–3.

==== Week 7: vs. St. Louis Rams ====
Week Seven: Seattle Seahawks vs. St. Louis Rams – Game summary

Quarter	1	2	3	4	Total
Rams	3	0	3	0	6
Seahawks	7	3	13	10	33

at Qwest Field, Seattle

- Date: October 21
- Game time: 1:16pm local
- Game weather: rain, 52 °F (11 °C), 85% humidity, wind SSW 11 miles per hour (18 km/h)
- Game attendance: 68,164
- Referee: Jerome Boger
- TV announcers (Fox): Matt Devlin & J. C. Pearson
- Gamecenter, Gamebook

Game information

First quarter

- SEA – Will Heller 1-yard pass from Matt Hasselbeck (Josh Brown kick), 7:40. Seahawks 7–0. Drive: 11 plays, 71 yards, 5:45.
- STL – Jeff Wilkins 31-yard field goal, 1:02. Seahawks 7–3. Drive: 8 plays, 35 yards, 3:30.

Second quarter

- SEA – Josh Brown 38-yard field goal, 10:15. Seahawks 10–3. Drive: 12 plays, 52 yards, 5:47.

Third quarter

- SEA – Nate Burleson 91-yard kickoff return (Josh Brown kick), 14:47. Seahawks 17–3. Drive: 0 plays, 0 yards, 0:13.
- STL – Jeff Wilkins 29-yard field goal, 10:33. Seahawks 17–6. Drive: 9 plays, 62 yards, 4:14.
- SEA – Josh Brown 48-yard field goal, 6:29. Seahawks 20–6. Drive: 9 plays, 38 yards, 4:04.
- SEA – Josh Brown 45-yard field goal, 4:00. Seahawks 23–6. Drive: 4 plays, -6 yards, 1:34.

Fourth quarter

- SEA – Josh Brown 43-yard field goal, 7:02. Seahawks 26–6. Drive: 5 plays, 19 yards, 2:04.
- SEA – Will Heller 11-yard pass from Matt Hasselbeck (Josh Brown kick), 6:08. Seahawks 33–6. Drive: 2 plays, 14 yards, 0:42.

Top passers

- STL – Marc Bulger: 21/40, 225 yds, 3 INT
- SEA – Matt Hasselbeck: 18/35, 195 yds, 2 TD, 1 INT

Top rushers

- STL – Brian Leonard: 12 car, 44 yds
- SEA – Shaun Alexander: 19 car, 47 yds

Top receivers

- STL – Torry Holt: 8 rec, 82 yds
- SEA – Bobby Engram: 6 rec, 73 yds

Team – pass – rush – total – to

- STL – 168 – 53 – 221 – 5
- SEA – 189 – 100 – 289 – 1

Trying to snap a two-game skid, the Seahawks stayed at home for a Week 7 divisional duel with the winless St. Louis Rams. In the first quarter, Seattle took flight early as quarterback Matt Hasselbeck completed a 1-yard touchdown pass to tight end Will Heller. The Rams replied with kicker Jeff Wilkins getting a 31-yard field goal. In the second quarter, the Seahawks increased their lead with kicker Josh Brown getting a 38-yard field goal for the only score of the period.

In the third quarter, the Seahawks continued to pound away as wide receiver Nate Burleson the half's opening kickoff 91 yards for a touchdown. Afterwards, St. Louis got its final score of the game with Wilkins getting a 29-yard field goal. Afterwards, Seattle took control with Brown kicking a 45-yard and a 43-yard field goal. In the fourth quarter, the Seahawks sealed their victory with Brown nailing a 43-yard field goal, while Hasselbeck and Heller hooked up with each other again on an 11-yard touchdown pass. Despite offensive problems, Seattle defense recovered two St. Louis fumbles, forced three interceptions and seven sacks (four by second-year player Darryl Tapp).

With their 5th straight win over the Rams, the Seahawks entered its bye week at 4–3.

==== Week 9: at Cleveland Browns ====
Week Nine: Seattle Seahawks at Cleveland Browns – Game summary

Quarter	1	2	3	4	OT	Total
Seahawks	7	14	3	6	0	30
Browns	0	9	7	14	3	33

at Cleveland Browns Stadium, Cleveland, Ohio

- Date: November 4
- Game time: 4:06pm local
- Game weather: cloudy, 48 °F (9 °C), 50% humidity, wind W 6 miles per hour (9.7 km/h)
- Game attendance: 72,927
- Referee: Gene Steratore
- TV announcers (Fox): Sam Rosen & Tim Ryan
- Gamecenter, Gamebook

Game information

First quarter

- SEA – Bobby Engram 5-yard pass from Matt Hasselbeck (Josh Brown kick), 5:13. Seahawks 7–0. Drive: 7 plays, 80 yards, 4:12.

Second quarter

- CLE – Jamal Lewis 2-yard run (Phil Dawson kick failed), 12:49. Seahawks 7–6. Drive: 9 plays, 57 yards, 4:58.
- SEA – D. J. Hackett 6-yard pass from Matt Hasselbeck (Josh Brown kick), 6:23. Seahawks 14–6. Drive: 12 plays, 78 yards, 6:26.
- SEA – Nate Burleson 94-yard punt return (Josh Brown kick), 3:49. Seahawks 21–6.
- CLE – Phil Dawson 19-yard field goal, 0:21. Seahawks 21–9. Drive: 9 plays, 54 yards, 1:24.

Third quarter

- CLE – Jamal Lewis 1-yard run (Phil Dawson kick), 8:57. Seahawks 21–16. Drive: 11 plays, 69 yards, 6:03.
- SEA – Josh Brown 39-yard field goal, 5:06. Seahawks 24–16. Drive: 10 plays, 39 yards, 3:51.

Fourth quarter

- CLE – Jamal Lewis 2-yard run (pass failed), 12:42. Seahawks 24–22. Drive: 10 plays, 54 yards, 5:06.
- SEA – Josh Brown 26-yard field goal, 7:55. Seahawks 27–22. Drive: 9 plays, 65 yards, 4:47.
- CLE – Jamal Lewis 1-yard run (Joe Jurevicius pass from Derek Anderson), 2:17. Browns 30–27. Drive: 14 plays, 89 yards, 5:38.
- SEA – Josh Brown 22-yard field goal, 0:00. Tied 30–30. Drive: 13 plays, 67 yards, 2:17.

Overtime

- CLE – Phil Dawson 25-yard field goal, 9:19. Browns 33–30. Drive: 6 plays, 49 yards, 3:26.

Top passers

- SEA – Matt Hasselbeck: 30/47, 318 yds, 2 TD, 1 INT
- CLE – Derek Anderson: 29/48, 364 yds, 1 INT

Top rushers

- SEA – Shaun Alexander: 9 car, 55 yds
- CLE – Jamal Lewis: 20 car, 37 yds, 4 TD

Top receivers

- SEA – Bobby Engram: 14 rec, 139 yds, 1 TD
- CLE – Kellen Winslow: 11 rec, 125 yds

Team – pass – rush – total – to

- SEA – 318 – 105 – 423 – 2
- CLE – 364 – 64 – 428 – 1

Coming off of their bye week, the Seahawks flew to Cleveland Browns Stadium for a Week 9 interconference duel with the Cleveland Browns. In the first quarter, Seattle took flight as quarterback Matt Hasselbeck completed a 5-yard touchdown pass to wide receiver Bobby Engram for the only score of the period. In the second quarter, the Browns responded with running back Jamal Lewis getting a 2-yard touchdown run (with a failed extra point). The Seahawks would reply with Hasselbeck completing a 6-yard touchdown pass to wide receiver D. J. Hackett, along with wide receiver/punt returner Nate Burleson returning a punt 94 yards for a touchdown. Cleveland would end the half with kicker Phil Dawson getting a 19-yard field goal.

In the third quarter, the Browns began to fight back with Lewis getting a 1-yard touchdown run. Seattle's response came from kicker Josh Brown who managed to get a 39-yard field goal. In the fourth quarter, Cleveland continued to fight hard as Lewis got another 2-yard touchdown run (followed by a failed 2-point conversion). The Seahawks would then increase its lead with Brown kicking a 26-yard field goal. However, the Browns finally took the lead as Lewis got another 1-yard touchdown run (followed by quarterback Derek Anderson's 2-point conversion pass to former Seahawks wide receiver Joe Jurevicius). Afterwards, Seattle would force overtime as Brown kicked a 22-yard field goal. In overtime, the Seahawks got the ball to begin the period. However, the drive stalled when Seattle couldn't convert on a 4th and 1. Afterwards, Cleveland responded and ended the game with Dawson's game-winning 25-yard field goal.

With the loss, the Seahawks fell to 4–4.

==== Week 10: vs. San Francisco 49ers ====
Week Ten: Seattle Seahawks vs. San Francisco 49ers – Game summary

Quarter	1	2	3	4	Total
49ers	0	0	0	0	0
Seahawks	10	7	0	7	24

at Qwest Field, Seattle

- Date: November 12
- Game time: 5:41pm local
- Game weather: cloudy, 49 °F (9 °C), 74% humidity, wind S 10 miles per hour (16 km/h)
- Game attendance: 68,331
- Referee: Larry Nemmers
- TV announcers (ESPN): Mike Tirico, Ron Jaworski & Tony Kornheiser
- Gamecenter, Gamebook

Game information

First quarter

- SEA – Will Heller 1-yard pass from Matt Hasselbeck (Josh Brown kick), 8:17. Seahawks 7–0. Drive: 13 plays, 84 yards, 5:33.
- SEA – Josh Brown 20-yard field goal, 4:07. Seahawks 10–0. Drive: 7 plays, 19 yards, 2:38.

Second quarter

- SEA – Maurice Morris 6-yard run (Josh Brown kick), 5:17. Seahawks 17–0. Drive: 3 plays, 52 yards, 0:44.

Third quarter

- No scoring plays.

Fourth quarter

- SEA – D. J. Hackett 10-yard pass from Matt Hasselbeck (Josh Brown kick), 14:55. Seahawks 24–0. Drive: 12 plays, 77 yards, 6:12.

Top passers

- SF – Alex Smith: 12/28, 114 yds
- SEA – Matt Hasselbeck: 27/40, 278 yds, 2 TD, 1 INT

Top rushers

- SF – Frank Gore: 13 car, 72 yds
- SEA – Maurice Morris: 28 car, 87 yds, 1 TD

Top receivers

- SF – Arnaz Battle: 4 rec, 78 yds
- SEA – D. J. Hackett: 8 rec, 101 yds, 1 TD

Team – pass – rush – total – to

- SF – 94 – 79 – 173 – 2
- SEA – 274 – 106 – 380 – 2

Hoping to rebound from their overtime road loss to the Browns, the Seahawks went home for an NFC West rematch on Monday Night Football with the San Francisco 49ers. In the first quarter, Seattle took flight as quarterback Matt Hasselbeck completing a 1-yard touchdown pass to tight end Will Heller, along with kicker Josh Brown nailing a 20-yard field goal. In the second quarter, the Seahawks increased their lead with running back Maurice Morris getting a 6-yard touchdown run for the only score of the period. After a scoreless third quarter, Seattle sealed the victory and the season-sweep in the fourth quarter with Hasselbeck completing a 10-yard touchdown pass. This would mark the third straight time that the Seahawks had shut out their opponent on Monday Night Football (5 overall).

With the win, the Seahawks improved to 5–4 and swept the 49ers.

Since 2001, Seattle has won 17 out of 21 contests at home against NFC West opponents.

==== Week 11: vs. Chicago Bears ====
Week Eleven: Seattle Seahawks vs. Chicago Bears – Game summary

Quarter	1	2	3	4	Total
Bears	10	7	0	6	23
Seahawks	7	10	7	6	30

at Qwest Field, Seattle

- Date: November 18
- Game time: 1:16pm local
- Game weather: cloudy, 46 °F (8 °C), 80% humidity, wind ENE 1 mile per hour (1.6 km/h)
- Game attendance: 68,249
- Referee: John Parry
- TV announcers (Fox): Matt Vasgersian & J.C. Pearson
- Gamecenter, Gamebook

Game information

First quarter

- CHI – Cedric Benson 43-yard run (Robbie Gould kick), 14:05. Bears 7–0. Drive: 2 plays, 50 yards, 0:55.
- CHI – Robbie Gould 31-yard field goal, 8:51. Bears 10–0. Drive: 6 plays, 53 yards, 2:35.
- SEA – D. J. Hackett 19-yard pass from Matt Hasselbeck (Josh Brown kick), 3:45. Bears 10–7. Drive: 10 plays, 76 yards, 5:06.

Second quarter

- SEA – Maurice Morris 19-yard run (Josh Brown kick), 6:31. Seahawks 14–10. Drive: 4 plays, 32 yards, 1:12.
- CHI – Adrian Peterson 5-yard run (Robbie Gould kick), 1:16. Bears 17–14. Drive: 10 plays, 60 yards, 5:15.
- SEA – Josh Brown 40-yard field goal, 0:17. Tied 17–17. Drive: 6 plays, 38 yards, 0:59.

Third quarter

- SEA – Nate Burleson 4-yard pass from Matt Hasselbeck (Josh Brown kick), 11:05. Seahawks 24–17. Drive: 8 plays, 49 yards, 3:55.

Fourth quarter

- CHI – Robbie Gould 47-yard field goal, 14:15. Seahawks 24–20. Drive: 10 plays, 57 yards, 3:55.
- SEA – Josh Brown 23-yard field goal, 12:10. Seahawks 27–20. Drive: 5 plays, 68 yards, 2:05.
- SEA – Josh Brown 46-yard field goal, 3:31. Seahawks 30–20. Drive: 5 plays, 19 yards, 2:12.
- CHI – Robbie Gould 48-yard field goal, 0:13. Seahawks 30–23. Drive: 7 plays, 41 yards, 1:29.

Top passers

- CHI – Rex Grossman: 24/37, 266 yds
- SEA – Matt Hasselbeck: 30/44, 337 yds, 2 TD

Top rushers

- CHI – Cedric Benson: 11 car, 89 yds, 1 TD
- SEA – Maurice Morris: 18 car, 87 yds, 1 TD

Top receivers

- CHI – Bernard Berrian: 9 rec, 102 yds
- SEA – D. J. Hackett: 9 rec, 136 yds, 1 TD

Team – pass – rush – total – to

- CHI – 238 – 107 – 345 – 1
- SEA – 322 – 103 – 425 – 1

Coming off their season-sweeping home win over the 49ers, the Seahawks stayed at home for a Week 11 duel against the Chicago Bears, in the rematch of last year's NFC Divisional game (previously in Chicago).

In the first quarter, Seattle trailed early as Bears running back Cedric Benson got a 43-yard touchdown run, along with kicker Robbie Gould getting a 31-yard field goal. The Seahawks would get on the board with quarterback Matt Hasselbeck completing a 19-yard touchdown pass to wide receiver D. J. Hackett. In the second quarter, the Seahawks took the lead with running back Maurice Morris getting a 19-yard touchdown run. However, Chicago regained the lead with running back Adrian Peterson getting a 5-yard touchdown run. Seattle would tie the game kicker Josh Brown getting a 40-yard field goal.

In the third quarter, Seattle retook the lead as Hasselbeck completed a 4-yard touchdown pass to wide receiver Nate Burleson for the only score of the period. In the fourth quarter, the Bears tried to retaliate as Gould kicked a 47-yard field goal. Afterwards, Seattle pulled away with Brown kicking a 23-yard and a 46-yard field goal. Chicago's final response would be Gould nailing a 48-yard field goal.

With the win, the Seahawks improved to 6–4.

==== Week 12: at St. Louis Rams ====
Week Twelve: Seattle Seahawks at St. Louis Rams – Game summary

Quarter	1	2	3	4	Total
Seahawks	7	0	10	7	24
Rams	16	3	0	0	19

at Edward Jones Dome, St. Louis, Missouri

- Date: November 25
- Game time: 12:00pm local
- Game weather: indoors
- Game attendance: 65,423
- Referee: Walt Coleman
- TV announcers (Fox): Matt Vasgersian & J.C. Pearson
- Gamecenter, Gamebook

Game information

First quarter

- STL – Safety, Adam Carriker tackled Maurice Morris in end zone, 8:46. Rams 2–0.
- STL – Steven Jackson 53-yard run (Jeff Wilkins kick), 8:30. Rams 9–0. Drive: 1 play, 53 yards, 0:16.
- SEA – Josh Wilson 89-yard kickoff return (Josh Brown kick), 8:14. Rams 9–7. Drive: 0 plays, 0 yards, 0:16.
- STL – Isaac Bruce 15-yard pass from Gus Frerotte (Jeff Wilkins kick), 0:28. Rams 16–7. Drive: 6 plays, 30 yards, 3:33.

Second quarter

- STL – Jeff Wilkins 23-yard field goal, 8:07. Rams 19–7. Drive: 12 plays, 60 yards, 6:07.

Third quarter

- SEA – Josh Brown 33-yard field goal, 9:36. Rams 19–10. Drive: 9 plays, 51 yards, 4:03.
- SEA – Deion Branch 9-yard pass from Matt Hasselbeck (Josh Brown kick), 3:22. Rams 19–17. Drive: 5 plays, 67 yards, 1:51.

Fourth quarter

- SEA – Leonard Weaver 5-yard run (Josh Brown kick), 5:57. Seahawks 24–19. Drive: 10 plays, 80 yards, 4:50.

Top passers

- SEA – Matt Hasselbeck: 21/38, 249 yds, 1 TD, 1 INT
- STL – Gus Frerotte: 20/32, 161 yds, 1 TD, 1 INT

Top rushers

- SEA – Maurice Morris: 16 car, 79 yds
- STL – Steven Jackson: 23 car, 90 yds, 1 TD

Top receivers

- SEA – Deion Branch: 5 rec, 92 yds, 1 TD
- STL – Isaac Bruce: 6 rec, 63 yds, 1 TD

Team – pass – rush – total – to

- SEA – 87 – 215 – 302 – 2
- STL – 161 – 104 – 265 – 2

Coming off their home win over the Bears, the Seahawks flew to the Edward Jones Dome for a Week 12 NFC West rematch with the St. Louis Rams. In the first quarter, Seattle trailed as running back Maurice Morris was tackled in his own endzone by Rams nose tackle Adam Carriker for a safety, while running back Steven Jackson got a 53-yard touchdown run. Afterwards, the Seahawks started to take flight as cornerback Josh Wilson returned a kickoff 89 yards for a touchdown. Later, St. Louis increased their lead with quarterback Gus Frerotte completing a 15-yard touchdown pass to wide receiver Isaac Bruce. In the second quarter, the Rams increased their lead with kicker Jeff Wilkins getting a 23-yard field goal.

In the third quarter, Seattle gathered steam as kicker Josh Brown nailed a 33-yard field goal, while quarterback Matt Hasselbeck 9-yard touchdown pass to wide receiver Deion Branch. In the fourth quarter, the Seahawks took the lead with running back Leonard Weaver getting a 5-yard touchdown run. Later in the game, St. Louis threatened to retake their lead. However, Seattle managed to the Rams out on four-straight downs from inside their own 5-yard line.

With the win, not only did the Seahawks improve to 7–4, but also won their 6th straight game against St. Louis. Seattle even took the lead in the all-time divisional series 10–9.

==== Week 13: at Philadelphia Eagles ====
Week Thirteen: Seattle Seahawks at Philadelphia Eagles – Game summary

Quarter	1	2	3	4	Total
Seahawks	14	7	7	0	28
Eagles	10	7	7	0	24

at Lincoln Financial Field, Philadelphia, Pennsylvania

- Date: December 2
- Game time: 1:02pm local
- Game weather: rain, 33 °F (1 °C), 79% humidity, wind SE 9 miles per hour (14 km/h)
- Game attendance: 68,445
- Referee: Gerry Austin
- TV announcers (Fox): Kenny Albert, Daryl Johnston & Tony Siragusa
- Gamecenter, Gamebook

Game information

First quarter

- SEA – Shaun Alexander 2-yard run (Josh Brown kick), 13:48. Seahawks 7–0. Drive: 4 plays, 18 yards, 0:51.
- PHI – Correll Buckhalter 30-yard run (David Akers kick), 11:56. Tied 7–7. Drive: 5 plays, 65 yards, 1:52.
- SEA – Bobby Engram 12-yard pass from Matt Hasselbeck (Josh Brown kick), 7:21. Seahawks 14–7. Drive: 3 plays, 8 yards, 1:23.
- PHI – David Akers 31-yard field goal, 5:14. Seahawks 14–10. Drive: 7 plays, 53 yards, 2:07.

Second quarter

- SEA – Nate Burleson 43-yard pass from Matt Hasselbeck (Josh Brown kick), 11:16. Seahawks 21–10. Drive: 1 play, 43 yards, 0:10.
- PHI – Kevin Curtis 24-yard pass from A. J. Feeley (David Akers kick), 9:06. Seahawks 21–17. Drive: 4 plays, 60 yards, 2:10.

Third quarter

- PHI – Brian Westbrook 29-yard run (David Akers kick), 12:42. Eagles 24–21. Drive: 4 plays, 40 yards, 1:23.
- SEA – Maurice Morris 45-yard run (Josh Brown kick), 9:13. Seahawks 28–24. Drive: 3 plays, 53 yards, 1:26.

Fourth quarter

- No scoring plays.

Top passers

- SEA – Matt Hasselbeck: 19/34, 187 yds, 2 TD, 1 INT
- PHI – A. J. Feeley: 19/42, 220 yds, 1 TD, 4 INT

Top rushers

- SEA – Shaun Alexander: 20 car, 65 yds, 1 TD
- PHI – Brian Westbrook: 21 car, 93 yds, 1 TD

Top receivers

- SEA – Nate Burleson: 4 rec, 71 yds, 1 TD
- PHI – Kevin Curtis: 6 rec, 111 yds, 1 TD

Team – pass – rush – total – to

- PHI – 176 – 135 – 311 – 2
- SEA – 219 – 144 – 363 – 4

Coming off their road win over the Rams, the Seahawks flew to Lincoln Financial Field for a Week 13 duel with the Philadelphia Eagles. In the first quarter, Seattle took flight after linebacker Lofa Tatupu intercepted Eagles quarterback A. J. Feeley on the first play of the game, returning it to the 18-yard line. Running back Shaun Alexander cashed in a few plays later with a 2-yard touchdown run. The Eagles responded with running back Correll Buckhalter breaking free on a 30-yard touchdown run. Following another Tatupu interception of Feeley, quarterback Matt Hasselbeck completed a 12-yard touchdown pass to wide receiver Bobby Engram. Philadelphia would end the period with kicker David Akers nailing a 31-yard field goal. In the second quarter, Seattle drove to the Eagles' 22-yard line, but kicker Josh Brown missed the field goal attempt. After holding the Eagles to a 3 and out, Nate Burleson returned a punt 36 yards to the Eagles' 43-yard line. On the next play, Hasselbeck completing a short pass to Burleson, who took it 43 yards down the left sideline for a touchdown. The Eagles would cut the lead to 4 on a Feeley 24-yard touchdown pass to wide receiver Kevin Curtis, and then they drove to the Seahawks' 1-yard line just before the half. The Seahawks stopped the Eagles 4 times to keep the lead at the half.

In the third quarter, following a Bobby Engram fumble, Philadelphia took the lead as running back Brian Westbrook galloped away on a 29-yard touchdown run. Later, the Seahawks responded with running back Maurice Morris getting a 45-yard touchdown run and a 28–24 lead. The teams drove back and forth the rest the game, and the Eagles looked to be on the verge of victory after Westbrook returned a Seattle punt 64 yards to the Seahawks 14-yard line with 1:37 left in the game. However, linebacker Lofa Tatupu cemented the victory a minute later with his third interception at the 4-yard line.

With the win, the Seahawks improved to 8–4 and held a two-game lead over Arizona in the NFC West.

Tatupu was named NFC Defensive Player of the Week for his three interceptions.

==== Week 14: vs. Arizona Cardinals ====
Week Fourteen: Seattle Seahawks vs. Arizona Cardinals – Game summary

Quarter	1	2	3	4	Total
Cardinals	0	7	7	7	21
Seahawks	10	17	0	15	42

at Qwest Field, Seattle

- Date: December 9
- Game time: 1:06pm local
- Game weather: cloudy, 35 °F (2 °C), 83% humidity, wind calm
- Game attendance: 68,193
- Referee: Tony Corrente
- TV announcers (Fox): Sam Rosen & Tim Ryan
- Gamecenter, Gamebook

Game information

First quarter

- SEA – Josh Brown 23-yard field goal, 8:51. Seahawks 3–0. Drive: 7 plays, 28 yards, 3:09.
- SEA – Nate Burleson 7-yard pass from Matt Hasselbeck (Josh Brown kick), 0:46. Seahawks 10–0. Drive: 9 plays, 79 yards, 5:04.

Second quarter

- SEA – Bobby Engram 15-yard pass from Matt Hasselbeck (Josh Brown kick), 11:47. Seahawks 17–0. Drive: 4 plays, 59 yards, 1:39.
- SEA – Deion Branch 17-yard pass from Matt Hasselbeck (Josh Brown kick), 7:44. Seahawks 24–0. Drive: 4 plays, 58 yards, 2:01.
- ARI – Bryant Johnson 5-yard pass from Kurt Warner (Neil Rackers kick), 1:04. Seahawks 24–7. Drive: 5 plays, 26 yards, 1:46.
- SEA – Josh Brown 41-yard field goal, 0:02. Seahawks 27–7. Drive: 7 plays, 36 yards, 1:02.

Third quarter

- ARI – Jerheme Urban 2-yard pass from Kurt Warner (Neil Rackers kick), 0:57. Seahawks 27–14. Drive: 13 plays, 83 yards, 6:43.

Fourth quarter

- SEA – Marcus Pollard 3-yard pass from Matt Hasselbeck (Josh Brown kick), 10:42. Seahawks 34–14. Drive: 11 plays, 62 yards, 5:07.
- SEA – Safety, Josh Scobey tackled Mitch Berger in end zone, 9:25. Seahawks 36–14.
- SEA – Marcus Trufant 84-yard interception return (kick failed), 5:29. Seahawks 42–14.
- ARI – Larry Fitzgerald 11-yard pass from Kurt Warner (Neil Rackers kick), 2:27. Seahawks 42–21. Drive: 6 plays, 70 yards, 3:02.

Top passers

- ARI – Kurt Warner: 28/46, 337 yds, 3 TD, 5 INT
- SEA – Matt Hasselbeck: 22/33, 272 yds, 4 TD

Top rushers

- ARI – Edgerrin James: 13 car, 56 yds
- SEA – Shaun Alexander: 10 car, 38 yds

Top receivers

- ARI – Jerheme Urban: 6 rec, 123 yds, 1 TD
- SEA – Leonard Weaver: 4 rec, 56 yds

Team – pass – rush – total – to

- ARI – 305 – 50 – 355 – 5
- SEA – 269 – 80 – 349 – 0

Coming off their road win over the Eagles, the Seahawks went home for a Week 14 NFC West rematch with the Arizona Cardinals. In the first quarter, Seattle took flight early with kicker Josh Brown getting a 23-yard field goal, while quarterback Matt Hasselbeck completed a 7-yard touchdown pass to wide receiver Nate Burleson. In the second quarter, the Seahawks increased their lead with Hasselbeck completing a 15-yard touchdown pass to wide receiver Bobby Engram and a 17-yard touchdown pass to wide receiver Deion Branch. The Cardinals would get on the board as quarterback Kurt Warner completed a 5-yard touchdown pass to wide receiver Bryant Johnson. Seattle would end the half with Brown kicking a 41-yard field goal.

In the third quarter, Arizona was starting to make a comeback as Warner completed a 2-yard touchdown pass to wide receiver Jerheme Urban for the only score of the period. In the fourth quarter, the Seahawks pulled away as Hasselbeck completed a 3-yard touchdown pass to tight end Marcus Pollard, running back Josh Scobey tackled Cardinals punter Mitch Berger in his endzone for a safety, and cornerback Marcus Trufant returned an interception 84 yards for a touchdown (with a failed extra point). Arizona tried to mount a comeback as Warner completed an 11-yard touchdown pass to wide receiver Larry Fitzgerald. Fortunately, Seattle's defense prevented any hopes of a Cardinals comeback from happening.

With the win, not only did the Seahawks improve to 9–4, but they also clinched their fourth straight NFC West title.

==== Week 15: at Carolina Panthers ====
Week Fifteen: Seattle Seahawks at Carolina Panthers – Game summary

Quarter	1	2	3	4	Total
Seahawks	0	0	0	10	10
Panthers	0	0	0	13	13

at Bank of America Stadium, Charlotte, North Carolina

- Date: December 16
- Game time: 1:02pm local
- Game weather: clear, 45 °F (7 °C), 78% humidity, wind SW 18 miles per hour (29 km/h)
- Game attendance: 73,421
- Referee: Walt Anderson
- TV announcers (Fox): Dick Stockton & Brian Baldinger
- Gamecenter, Gamebook

Game information

First quarter

- No scoring plays.

Second quarter

- No scoring plays.

Third quarter

- No scoring plays.

Fourth quarter

- CAR – John Kasay 53-yard field goal, 12:18. Panthers 3–0. Drive: 10 plays, 44 yards, 5:25.
- SEA – Josh Brown 23-yard field goal, 8:23. Tied 3–3. Drive: 8 plays, 76 yards, 3:55.
- CAR – John Kasay 37-yard field goal, 2:59. Panthers 6–3. Drive: 10 plays, 41 yards, 5:24.
- CAR – DeAngelo Williams 35-yard run (John Kasay kick), 1:17. Panthers 13–3. Drive: 3 plays, 40 yards, 0:21.
- SEA – Deion Branch 15-yard pass from Matt Hasselbeck (Josh Brown kick), 0:01. Panthers 13–10. Drive: 6 plays, 65 yards, 1:16.

Top passers

- SEA – Matt Hasselbeck: 27/41, 274 yds, 1 TD
- CAR – Matt Moore: 19/27, 208 yds

Top rushers

- SEA – Shaun Alexander: 7 car, 17 yds
- CAR – DeAngelo Williams: 15 car, 61 yds, 1 TD

Top receivers

- SEA – Bobby Engram: 9 rec, 84 yds
- CAR – Steve Smith, Sr.: 8 rec, 72 yds

Team – pass – rush – total – to

- SEA – 238 – 44 – 282 – 1
- CAR – 208 – 114 – 322 – 0

Coming off their division-clinching home win over the Cardinals, the Seahawks flew to Bank of America Stadium for a Week 15 intraconference duel with the Carolina Panthers. The game was scoreless until the fourth quarter when Seattle trailed on the foot of Panthers kicker John Kasay's 53-yard field goal. The Seahawks would respond with kicker Josh Brown getting a 23-yard field goal. However, Carolina began to pull away as Kasay nailed a 37-yard field goal and running back DeAngelo Williams managed to get a 35-yard touchdown run. Seattle tried to rally as quarterback Matt Hasselbeck completed a 15-yard touchdown pass to wide receiver Deion Branch. However, the Panthers' defense held on for the win.

With the loss, the Seahawks fell to 9–5.

==== Week 16: vs. Baltimore Ravens ====
Week Sixteen: Seattle Seahawks vs. Baltimore Ravens – Game summary

Quarter	1	2	3	4	Total
Ravens	0	0	0	6	6
Seahawks	0	21	6	0	27

at Qwest Field, Seattle, Washington

- Date: December 23
- Game time: 1:16pm local
- Game weather: rain, 43 °F (6 °C), 95% humidity, wind calm
- Game attendance: 68,164
- Referee: Bill Carollo
- TV announcers (CBS): Bill Macatee & Steve Beuerlein
- Gamecenter, Gamebook

Game information

First quarter

- No scoring plays.

Second quarter

- SEA – Nate Burleson 21-yard pass from Matt Hasselbeck (Josh Brown kick), 11:34. Seahawks 7–0. Drive: 11 plays, 89 yards, 6:12.
- SEA – Leroy Hill 20-yard defensive fumble return (Josh Brown kick), 5:57. Seahawks 14–0.
- SEA – Shaun Alexander 14-yard pass from Matt Hasselbeck (Josh Brown kick), 1:53. Seahawks 21–0. Drive: 6 plays, 70 yards, 2:22.

Third quarter

- SEA – Josh Brown 42-yard field goal, 5:40. Seahawks 24–0. Drive: 9 plays, 56 yards, 4:54.
- SEA – Josh Brown 39-yard field goal, 3:07. Seahawks 27–0. Drive: 4 plays, -1 yards, 1:44.

Fourth quarter

- BAL – Derrick Mason 79-yard pass from Troy Smith (pass failed), 4:41. Seahawks 27–6. Drive: 3 plays, 92 yards, 1:22.

Top passers

- BAL – Troy Smith: 16/33, 199 yds, 1 TD
- SEA – Matt Hasselbeck: 18/27, 199 yds, 2 TD, 2 INT

Top rushers

- BAL – Mike Anderson: 8 car, 44 yds
- SEA – Shaun Alexander: 13 car, 73 yds

Top receivers

- BAL – Derrick Mason: 5 rec, 98 yds, 1 TD
- SEA – Bobby Engram: 5 rec, 69 yds

Team – pass – rush – total – to

- BAL – 187 – 106 – 293 – 3
- SEA – 192 – 144 – 336 – 2

Hoping to rebound from their road loss to the Panthers, the Seahawks went home for a Week 16 interconference duel with the Baltimore Ravens. After a scoreless first quarter, the Seahawks took flight in the second quarter with quarterback Matt Hasselbeck completing a 21-yard touchdown pass to wide receiver Nate Burleson, along with linebacker Leroy Hill returning a fumble 20 yards for a touchdown, and Hasselbeck completing a 14-yard touchdown pass to running back Shaun Alexander.

In the third quarter, Seattle increased its lead with kicker Josh Brown nailing a 42-yard and a 39-yard field goal. In the fourth quarter, the Ravens would get their only score of the period as quarterback Troy Smith completed a 79-yard touchdown pass to wide receiver Derrick Mason.

With the win, the Seahawks improved to 10–5.

==== Week 17: at Atlanta Falcons ====
Week Seventeen: Seattle Seahawks at Atlanta Falcons – Game summary

Quarter	1	2	3	4	Total
Seahawks	7	10	10	14	41
Falcons	0	17	3	24	44

at Georgia Dome, Atlanta

- Date: December 30
- Game time: 1:04pm local
- Game weather: indoors
- Game attendance: 64,925
- Referee: Ed Hochuli
- TV announcers (Fox): Chris Myers & Jason Sehorn
- Gamecenter, Gamebook

Game information

First quarter

- SEA – Shaun Alexander 2-yard run (Josh Brown kick), 10:32. Seahawks 7–0. Drive: 10 plays, 77 yards, 4:28.

Second quarter

- SEA – Josh Brown 54-yard field goal, 13:09. Seahawks 10–0. Drive: 6 plays, 18 yards, 1:55.
- ATL – Joe Horn 4-yard pass from Chris Redman (Morten Andersen kick), 9:34. Seahawks 10–7. Drive: 7 plays, 71 yards, 3:35.
- ATL– Warrick Dunn 5-yard run (Morten Andersen kick), 5:10. Falcons 14–10. Drive: 2 plays, 32 yards, 0:42.
- SEA – Bobby Engram 30-yard pass from Matt Hasselbeck (Josh Brown kick), 1:10. Seahawks 17–14. Drive: 4 plays, 83 yards, 4:00.
- ATL – Morten Andersen 30-yard field goal, 0:00. Tied 17–17. Drive: 8 plays, 42 yards, 1:10.

Third quarter

- SEA – Josh Brown 51-yard field goal, 6:41. Seahawks 20–17. Drive: 12 plays, 51 yards, 6:13.
- ATL – Morten Andersen 37-yard field goal, 4:07. Tied 20–20. Drive: 7 plays, 18 yards, 2:34.
- SEA – Maurice Morris 29-yard run (Josh Brown kick), 1:19. Seahawks 27–20. Drive: 7 plays, 77 yards, 2:48.

Fourth quarter

- ATL – Alge Crumpler 55-yard pass from Chris Redman (Morten Andersen kick), 14:52. Tied 27–27. Drive: 4 plays, 68 yards, 1:27.
- ATL – Alge Crumpler 7-yard pass from Chris Redman (Morten Andersen kick), 13:30. Falcons 34–27. Drive: 3 plays, 19 yards, 1:07.
- ATL – Roddy White 10-yard pass from Chris Redman (Morten Andersen kick), 13:15. Falcons 41–27. Drive: 1 play, 10 yards, 0:05.
- SEA – Nate Burleson 45-yard pass from Seneca Wallace (Josh Brown kick), 7:49. Falcons 41–34. Drive: 11 plays, 80 yards, 5:26.
- ATL – Morten Andersen 32-yard field goal, 3:23. Falcons 44–34. Drive: 8 plays, 53 yards, 4:26.
- SEA – Nate Burleson 13-yard pass from Seneca Wallace (Josh Brown kick), 0:54. Falcons 44–41. Drive: 10 plays, 81 yards, 2:29.

Top passers

- SEA – Seneca Wallace: 17/22, 206 yds, 2 TD, 1 INT
- ATL – Chris Redman: 17/27, 251 yds, 4 TD

Top rushers

- SEA – Maurice Morris: 13 car, 91 yds, 1 TD
- ATL – Warrick Dunn: 12 car, 70 yds, 1 TD

Top receivers

- SEA – Nate Burleson: 7 rec, 119 yds, 2 TD
- ATL – Alge Crumpler: 3 rec, 67 yds, 2 TD

Team – pass – rush – total – to

- SEA – 334 – 167 – 501 – 3
- ATL – 240 – 124 – 364 – 0

=== Postseason ===
Seattle entered the postseason as the #3 seed in the NFC.

==== NFC Wild Card Playoff Game: vs. #6 Washington Redskins ====
NFC Wild Card Playoff: #6 Washington Redskins at #3 Seattle Seahawks – Game summary

Quarter	1	2	3	4	Total
Redskins	0	0	0	14	14
Seahawks	7	3	3	22	35

at Qwest Field, Seattle

- Date: January 5
- Game time: 1:35pm local
- Game weather: partly cloudy, 42 °F (6 °C), 79% humidity, wind SSE 13 miles per hour (21 km/h)
- Game attendance: 68,297
- Referee: Walt Coleman
- TV announcers (NBC): Tom Hammond & Cris Collinsworth
- Gamecenter, Gamebook

Game information

First quarter

- SEA – Leonard Weaver 17-yard run (Josh Brown kick), 3:45. Seahawks 7–0. Drive: 6 plays, 45 yards, 3:21.

Second quarter

- SEA – Josh Brown 50-yard field goal, 8:58. Seahawks 10–0. Drive: 5 plays, 33 yards, 1:42.

Third quarter

- SEA – Josh Brown 33-yard field goal, 4:30. Seahawks 13–0. Drive: 8 plays, 52 yards, 4:24.

Fourth quarter

- WAS – Antwaan Randle El 7-yard pass from Todd Collins (Shaun Suisham kick), 14:53. Seahawks 13–7. Drive: 12 plays, 84 yards, 4:37.
- WAS – Santana Moss 30-yard pass from Todd Collins (Shaun Suisham kick), 12:38. Redskins 14–13. Drive: 3 plays, 42 yards, 1:19.
- SEA – D. J. Hackett 20-yard pass from Matt Hasselbeck (Marcus Pollard pass from Matt Hasselbeck), 6:06. Seahawks 21–14. Drive: 5 plays, 42 yards, 1:57.
- SEA – Marcus Trufant 78-yard interception return (Josh Brown kick), 5:38. Seahawks 28–14.
- SEA – Jordan Babineaux 57-yard interception return (Josh Brown kick), 0:27. Seahawks 35–14.

Top passers

- WAS – Todd Collins: 29/50, 266 yds, 2 TD, 2 INT
- SEA – Matt Hasselbeck: 20/33, 229 yds, 1 TD, 2 INT

Top rushers

- WAS – Clinton Portis: 20 car, 52 yds
- SEA – Shaun Alexander: 15 car, 46 yds

Top receivers

- WAS – Antwaan Randle El: 10 rec, 94 yds, 1 TD
- SEA – D. J. Hackett: 6 rec, 101 yds, 1 TD

Team – pass – rush – total – to

- WAS – 244 – 75 – 319 – 2
- SEA – 227 – 77 – 304 – 2

==== NFC Divisional Playoff Game: at #2 Green Bay Packers ====
NFC Divisional Playoff: #3 Seattle Seahawks at #2 Green Bay Packers – Game summary

Quarter	1	2	3	4	Total
Seahawks	14	3	3	0	20
Packers	14	14	7	7	42

at Lambeau Field, Green Bay, Wisconsin

- Date: January 12
- Game time: 3:30pm local
- Game weather: light snow, 31 °F (−1 °C), 81% humidity, wind NE 4 miles per hour (6.4 km/h)
- Game attendance: 72,168
- Referee: Mike Carey
- TV announcers (Fox): Kenny Albert, Daryl Johnston & Tony Siragusa
- Gamecenter, Gamebook

Game information

First quarter

- SEA – Shaun Alexander 1-yard run (Josh Brown kick), 14:40. Seahawks 7–0. Drive: 1 play, 1 yard, 0:03.
- SEA – Bobby Engram 11-yard pass from Matt Hasselbeck (Josh Brown kick), 10:59. Seahawks 14–0. Drive: 6 plays, 49 yards, 2:52.
- GB – Greg Jennings 15-yard pass from Brett Favre (Mason Crosby kick), 7:08. Seahawks 14–7. Drive: 6 plays, 69 yards, 3:51.
- GB – Ryan Grant 1-yard run (Mason Crosby kick), 1:02. Tied 14–14. Drive: 0 plays, 64 yards, 4:50.

Second quarter

- GB – Greg Jennings 2-yard pass from Brett Favre (Mason Crosby kick), 13:22. Packers 21–14. Drive: 3 plays, 18 yards, 1:32.
- SEA – Josh Brown 29-yard field goal, 7:18. Packers 21–17. Drive: 11 plays, 63 yards, 6:04.
- GB – Ryan Grant 3-yard run (Mason Crosby kick), 0:26. Packers 28–17. Drive: 14 plays, 70 yards, 6:52.

Third quarter

- GB – Brandon Jackson 13-yard pass from Brett Favre (Mason Crosby kick), 10:25. Packers 35–17. Drive: 6 plays, 66 yards, 3:29.
- SEA – Josh Brown 27-yard field goal, 2:46. Packers 35–20. Drive: 14 plays, 70 yards, 7:39.

Fourth quarter

- GB – Ryan Grant 1-yard run (Mason Crosby kick), 13:26. Packers 42–20. Drive: 7 plays, 65 yards, 4:20.

Top passers

- SEA – Matt Hasselbeck: 19/33, 194 yds, 1 TD
- GB – Brett Favre: 18/23, 173 yds, 3 TD

Top rushers

- SEA – Shaun Alexander: 9 car, 20 yds, 1 TD
- GB – Ryan Grant: 27 car, 201 yds, 3 TD

Top receivers

- SEA – Bobby Engram: 6 rec, 67 yds, 1 TD
- GB – Greg Jennings: 6 rec, 71 yds, 2 TD

Team – pass – rush – total – to

- SEA – 172 – 28 – 200 – 1
- GB – 173 – 235 – 408 – 2

== See also ==
- 2007 NFL season
- 2007–08 NFL playoffs
