= Max Unger =

American football player (born 1986)

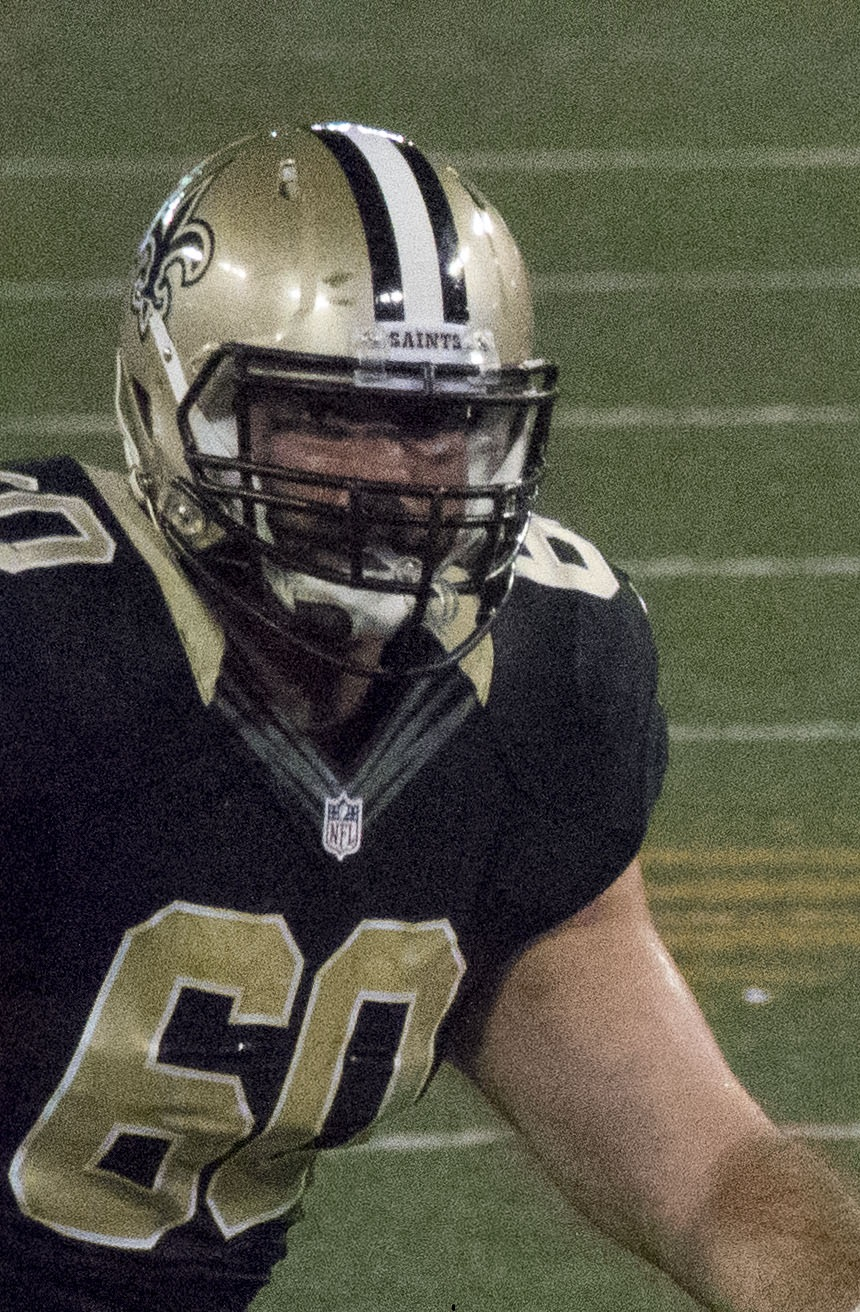
- Unger with the New Orleans Saints in 2015

No. 60
- Position: Center

Personal information
- Born: April 14, 1986 (age 40); Kailua-Kona, Hawaii, U.S.
- Listed height: 6 ft 5 in (1.96 m)
- Listed weight: 305 lb (138 kg)

Career information
- High school: Hawaii Preparatory Academy (Waimea, Hawaii)
- College: Oregon (2004–2008)
- NFL draft: 2009: 2nd round, 49th overall pick

Career history
- Seattle Seahawks (2009–2014); New Orleans Saints (2015–2018)

Awards and highlights
- Super Bowl champion (XLVIII); First-team All-Pro (2012); 3× Pro Bowl (2012, 2013, 2018); Seattle Seahawks Top 50 players; First-team All-American (2008); 2× First-team All-Pac-10 (2007, 2008); Second-team All-Pac-10 (2006)

Career NFL statistics
- Games played: 130
- Games started: 130
- Fumble recoveries: 5
- Stats at Pro Football Reference

Maxwell McCandless Unger (born April 14, 1986) is an American former professional football player who was a center in the National Football League (NFL) for 10 seasons. He played college football for the Oregon Ducks and was selected by the Seattle Seahawks in the second round of the 2009 NFL draft. Unger was the starting center for the Seahawks in Super Bowl XLVIII.

== Early life ==
Unger was born in Kailua-Kona, Hawaii. He attended Hawaii Preparatory Academy in Kamuela, Hawaii, where he was a 2002 second-team all-state offensive honoree.

Regarded as a three-star recruit by Rivals.com, Unger was listed as the No. 45 offensive guard.

== College career ==
Unger enrolled in the University of Oregon, where he played for the Oregon Ducks football team from 2005 to 2008. While playing for the Ducks, Unger was twice named as a first-team All-Pac-10 selection, and also receiving honorable mention and second-team All-Pac-10 honors. He was a first-team All-American in 2008 in recognition of his successful season. Unger started on the offensive line in all of his four years with the Ducks.

== Professional career ==
=== Pre-draft ===
Pre-draft measurables
Height	Weight	Arm length	Hand span	40-yard dash	10-yard split	20-yard split	20-yard shuttle	Three-cone drill	Vertical jump	Broad jump	Bench press
6 ft 4 5/8 in (1.95 m)	309 lb (140 kg)	32 1/2 in (0.83 m)	9 1/4 in (0.23 m)	5.35 s	1.87 s	3.12 s	4.50 s	7.39 s	24.5 in (0.62 m)	7 ft 9 in (2.36 m)	22 reps
All values from NFL Combine

Projected to be second round selection, Unger was listed as the No. 1 offensive guard available in the 2009 NFL draft. He was described as "not a great prospect," yet having "starting potential on the NFL level for years to come."

=== Seattle Seahawks ===
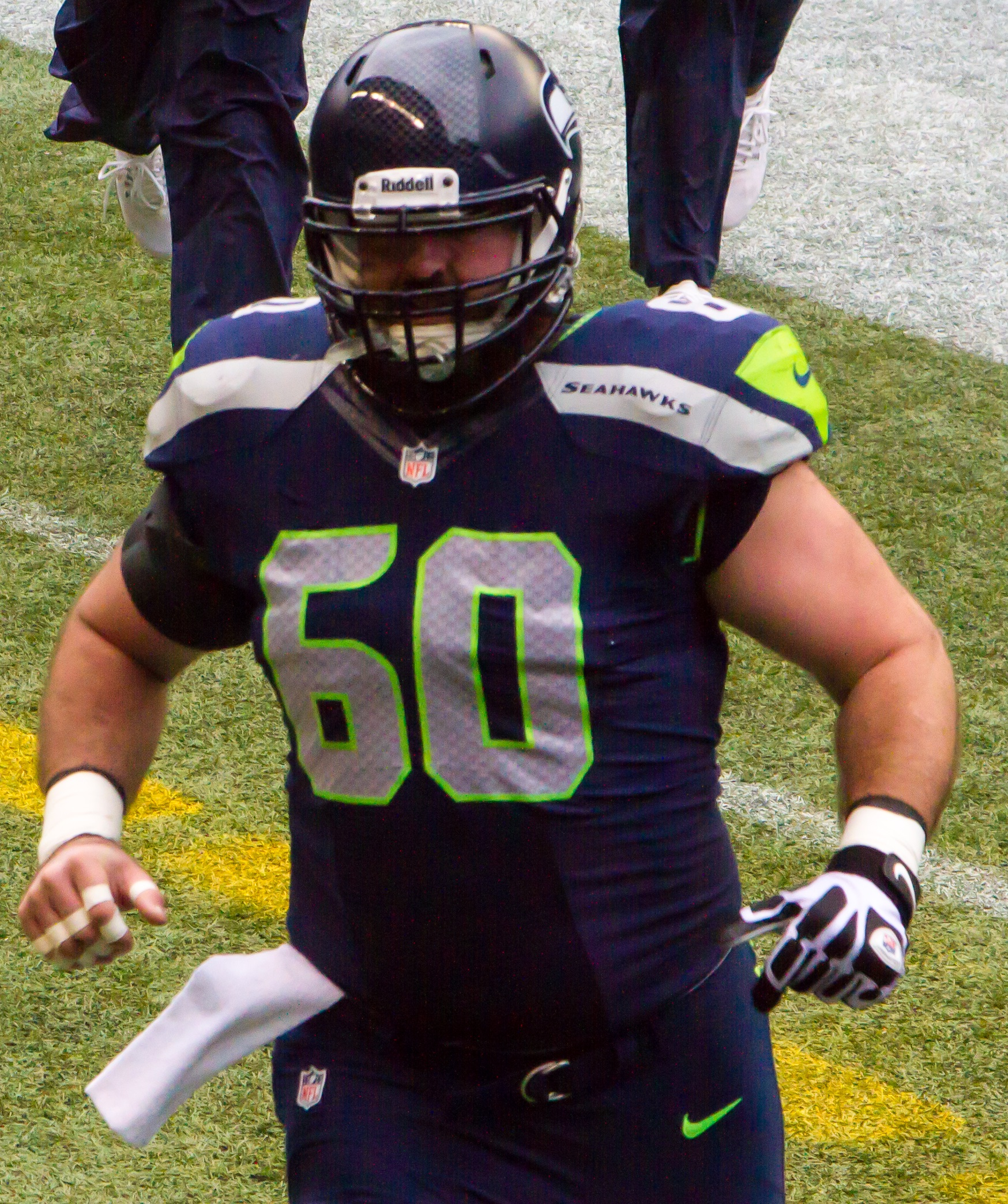
Unger with the Seahawks in 2013

Unger was drafted by the Seahawks in the second round with the 49th overall pick. He was the highest selected Oregon Ducks offensive lineman since Tom Drougas went 22nd overall in 1972. Unger signed a 4-year contract with the Seahawks worth over $3 million on July 29, 2009. After a pre-season effort in which head coach Jim Mora said "We believe he is ready to start and be a productive player in this league immediately," Unger was named starting right guard over Mansfield Wrotto. In 2012, Unger signed a four-year extension worth a maximum of $24 million making him one of the top 5 paid centers in the NFL. He was one of only three members to remain on the Seahawks from before John Schneider's arrival in Seattle in January 2010, along with Brandon Mebane and Jon Ryan. Unger won his first Super Bowl title with the Seattle Seahawks in Super Bowl XLVIII, beating the Denver Broncos by a score of 43–8. In 2013, he also made his second Pro Bowl team. In 2014, the Seahawks finished the season with a 12–4 record and made it back to the Super Bowl. The Seahawks failed to repeat as Super Bowl champions after they lost 28–24 to the New England Patriots in Super Bowl XLIX.

=== New Orleans Saints ===
On March 10, 2015, Unger, along with the Seahawks' first round selection in the 2015 NFL draft, were traded to the New Orleans Saints in exchange for tight end Jimmy Graham.

On May 8, 2017, it was reported that Unger suffered a foot injury and was expected to be out for five months and start the 2017 season on the PUP list. However the foot healed quicker than expected and was the Saints starting center for the entire 2017 season, starting all 16 games.

Unger was named to his first Pro Bowl with the Saints and his third overall in 2018.

=== Retirement ===
On March 16, 2019, Unger announced his retirement from the NFL after ten seasons.
