= Marcus Trufant =

American football player (born 1980)

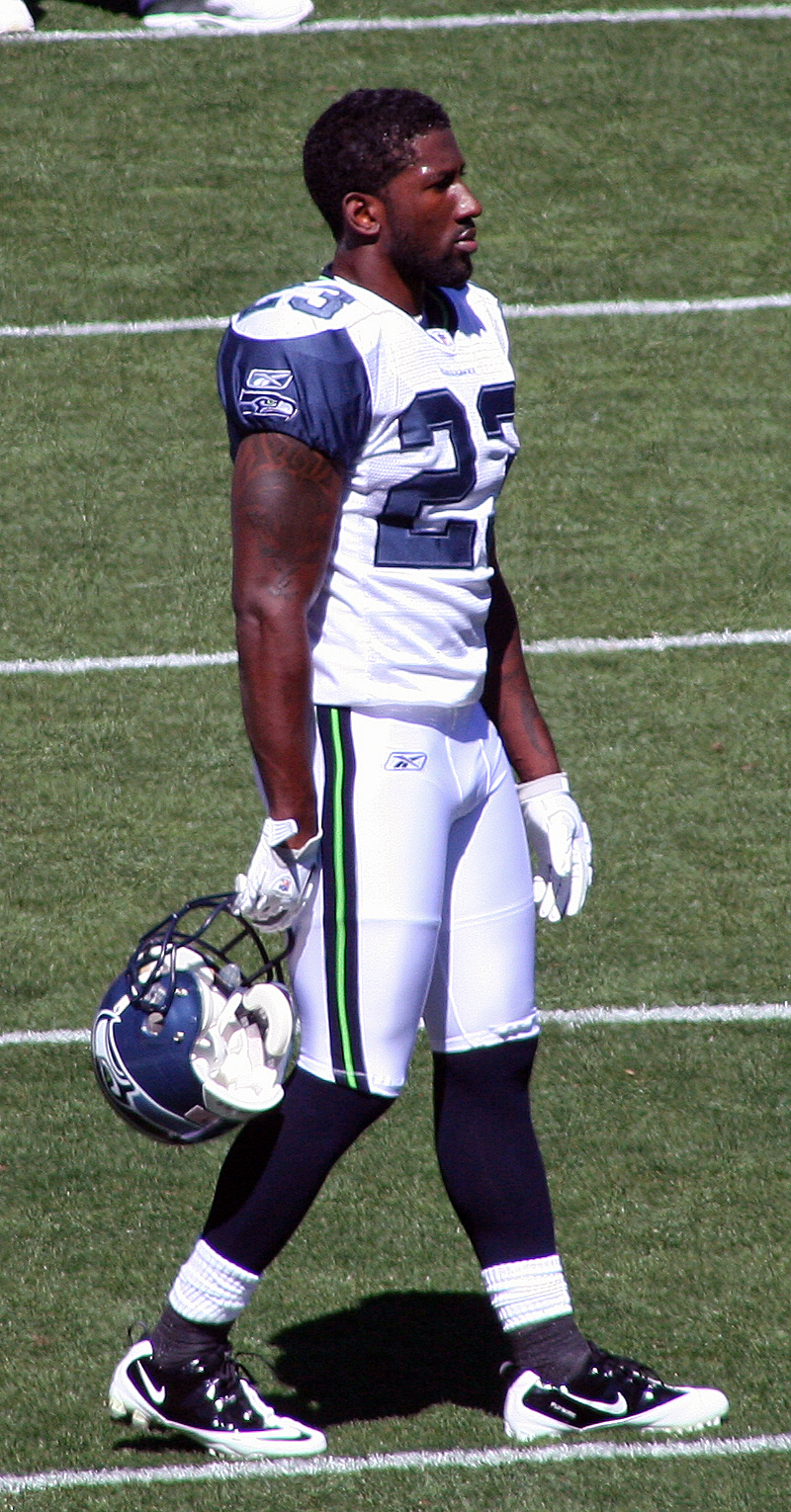
- Trufant with the Seattle Seahawks in 2010

No. 23
- Position: Cornerback

Personal information
- Born: December 25, 1980 (age 45); Tacoma, Washington, U.S.
- Listed height: 5 ft 11 in (1.80 m)
- Listed weight: 197 lb (89 kg)

Career information
- High school: Woodrow Wilson (Tacoma)
- College: Washington State
- NFL draft: 2003: 1st round, 11th overall pick

Career history
- Seattle Seahawks (2003–2012); Jacksonville Jaguars (2013)*
- * Offseason or practice squad member only

Awards and highlights
- Pro Bowl (2007); PFWA All-Rookie Team (2003); Seattle Seahawks 35th Anniversary team; Seattle Seahawks Top 50 players; Second-team All-American (2002); First-team All-Pac-10 (2002)

Career NFL statistics
- Total tackles: 644
- Sacks: 2
- Forced fumbles: 5
- Fumble recoveries: 6
- Interceptions: 21
- Defensive touchdowns: 2
- Stats at Pro Football Reference

Marcus Lavon Trufant (born December 25, 1980) is an American former professional football player who was a cornerback in the National Football League (NFL) for ten seasons. He played college football for the Washington State Cougars, and was chosen by the Seattle Seahawks 11th overall in the 2003 NFL draft.

From 2010 to 2012, Trufant helped mentor the young Seahawks secondary that became known as the Legion of Boom.

== Early life ==
A native of Tacoma, Washington, Trufant attended McCarver Elementary School and Truman Middle School. While attending Wilson High School in Tacoma, Trufant lettered in three varsity sports: football, basketball and track, capturing ninth at the State track meet in triple jump, with a leap of 14.50 meters. He was the team captain for two teams as a senior. As a junior, was Offensive Player of the Year in football and Mr. Defense in basketball. As a senior, he was named All-State by the Associated Press, the Seattle Post-Intelligencer and Washington Prep Report. Named Washington AAAA player of the year by The News Tribune as well as the Seattle PI and The Seattle Times All-League, All-Area and All-State teams. Lost the State AAAA championship as a senior and scored 30 TD and rushed for 1,800 yards on offense while recording 48 tackles and 8 interceptions on defense.

== College career ==
Trufant attended Washington State University after being recruited by then-Washington State Cougars football head coach Mike Price. He started for all four years for the Cougars and was a member of the 2003 Rose Bowl team that lost to the Oklahoma Sooners in his senior year. He did not allow a single touchdown against him for his last two years there. As a freshman in 1999, he was a freshman All-Pac-10 selection.

== Professional career ==
Pre-draft measurables
Height	Weight	Arm length	Hand span	40-yard dash	10-yard split	20-yard split	20-yard shuttle	Three-cone drill	Vertical jump	Broad jump	Bench press
5 ft 11 1/8 in (1.81 m)	199 lb (90 kg)	30 3/4 in (0.78 m)	8 1/4 in (0.21 m)	4.38 s	1.56 s	2.59 s	4.32 s	6.87 s	39 in (0.99 m)	10 ft 7 in (3.23 m)	11 reps
All values from NFL Combine

=== Seattle Seahawks ===
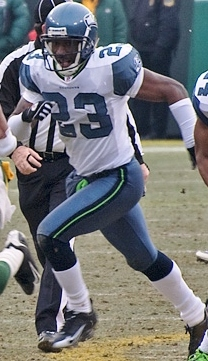
Trufant with the Seahawks in 2009

Trufant was selected in the first round by the Seattle Seahawks with the 11th overall pick in the 2003 NFL draft. Coming from Tacoma and graduating from Washington State University, Trufant is considered a hometown favorite. In 2007 Trufant played a big part in the Seahawks defense, intercepting a career-high 7 passes and returning one for an 84-yard touchdown. He also deflected 15 passes and made 85 tackles, and was voted into the 2008 Pro Bowl in Hawaii. On February 21, 2008, the Seahawks placed their franchise tag on Trufant, tendering him with a one-year $9.465 million deal.

On March 26, 2008, the Seahawks signed Trufant to a new six-year, $50.2 million deal with a $10 million signing bonus.

On October 17, 2011, Trufant was placed on injured reserve with a bruised sacrum, ending his season. The Seahawks released Trufant on March 8, 2012, but re-signed him one month and one day later on April 9, 2012, to a one-year contract.

=== Jacksonville Jaguars ===
On May 7, 2013, Trufant signed a contract with the Jacksonville Jaguars, reuniting him with his former defensive coordinator Gus Bradley. Trufant, Matt Hasselbeck and Leroy Hill were the last remaining players from the Seahawks' 2005 NFC championship season. He was released on August 30, 2013.

=== Retirement ===
On April 23, 2014, Trufant signed a one-day contract so that he could retire as a Seattle Seahawk.

== NFL statistics ==
Year	Team	GP	COMB	TOTAL	AST	SACK	FF	FR	FR YDS	INT	IR YDS	AVG IR	LNG	TD	PD
2003	SEA	16	83	74	9	0.0	0	1	0	2	21	11	15	0	19
2004	SEA	16	96	86	10	1.0	0	0	0	5	141	28	58	0	20
2005	SEA	15	64	55	9	1.0	1	0	0	1	7	7	7	0	14
2006	SEA	15	68	60	8	0.0	2	0	0	1	0	0	0	0	11
2007	SEA	16	85	78	7	0.0	0	0	0	7	150	21	84	1	15
2008	SEA	16	64	60	4	0.0	0	2	0	1	0	0	0	0	13
2009	SEA	10	49	43	6	0.0	0	0	0	2	4	2	4	0	6
2010	SEA	16	80	65	15	0.0	1	2	0	1	32	32	32	1	8
2011	SEA	4	23	20	3	0.0	0	0	0	1	15	15	15	0	3
2012	SEA	12	34	24	10	0.0	1	1	0	0	0	0	0	0	2
Career		136	646	565	81	2.0	5	6	0	21	370	18	84	2	111

== Awards and honors ==
NFL

- Pro Bowl (2007)
- PFWA All-Rookie Team (2003)
- PFW All-Rookie (2003)
- Seattle Seahawks 35th Anniversary team
- Seattle Seahawks Top 50 players

College

- Second-team All-American (2002)
- First-team All-Pac-10 (2002)
- Pac-10 All-Freshman (1999)
- Honorable mention All-Pac-10 (2001)

== Personal life ==
Trufant's younger brother, Isaiah Trufant, has also played in the NFL.

His youngest brother, Desmond, was drafted by the Atlanta Falcons in the 2013 NFL draft. He started at the cornerback position as a true freshman for the University of Washington in 2009 and remained a starter through his senior year in 2012.
