= Brandon Mebane =

American football player (born 1985)

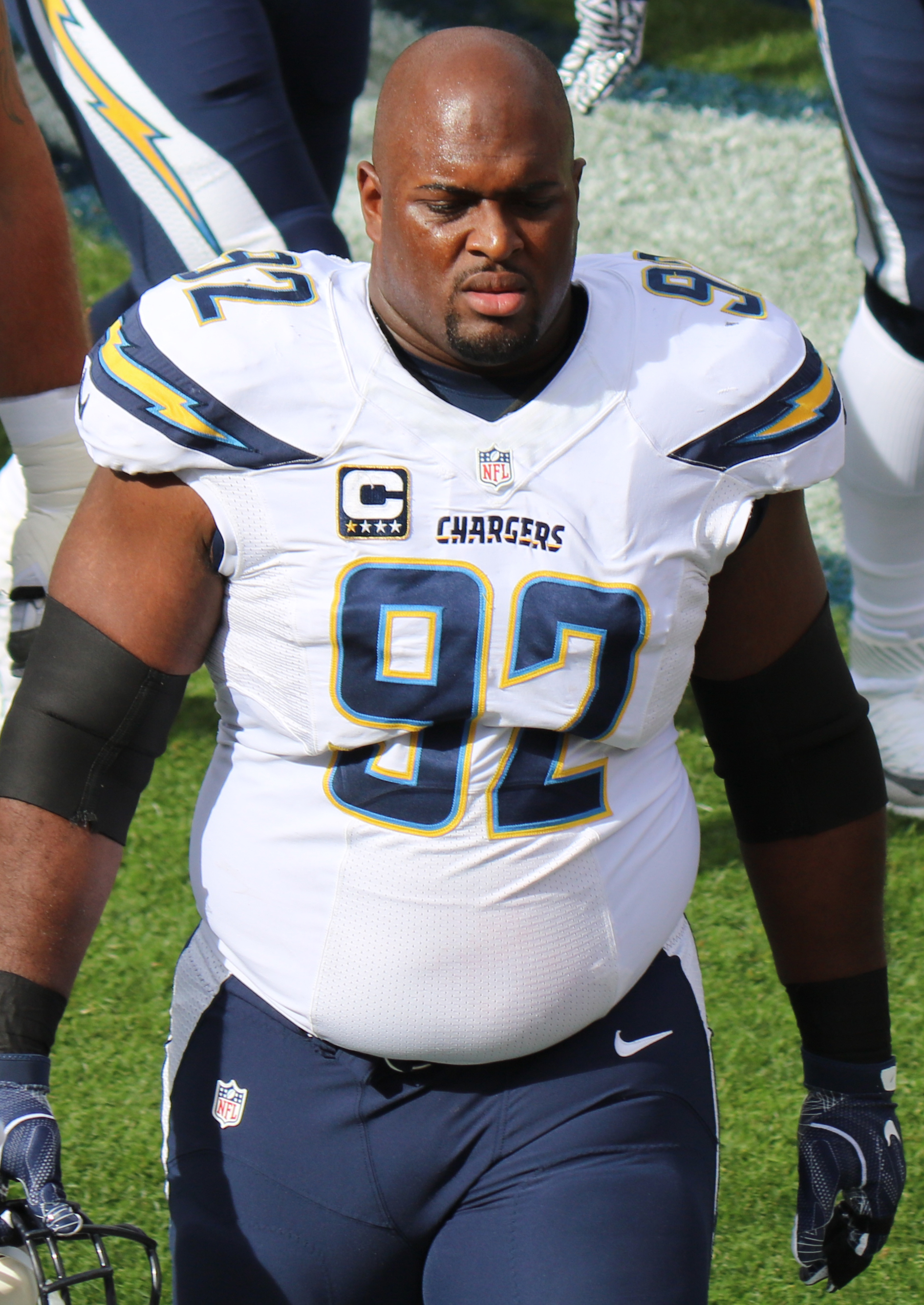
- Mebane with the San Diego Chargers in 2016

No. 92
- Position: Defensive tackle

Personal information
- Born: January 15, 1985 (age 41); Los Angeles, California, U.S.
- Listed height: 6 ft 1 in (1.85 m)
- Listed weight: 311 lb (141 kg)

Career information
- High school: Crenshaw (Los Angeles)
- College: California (2003–2006)
- NFL draft: 2007: 3rd round, 85th overall pick

Career history
- Seattle Seahawks (2007–2015); San Diego / Los Angeles Chargers (2016–2019)

Awards and highlights
- Super Bowl champion (XLVIII); PFWA All-Rookie Team (2007); Seattle Seahawks Top 50 players; 2× First-team All-Pac-10 (2005, 2006)

Career NFL statistics
- Total tackles: 467
- Sacks: 18.5
- Forced fumbles: 3
- Fumble recoveries: 4
- Interceptions: 1
- Stats at Pro Football Reference

Brandon Jerome Mebane MEE-bayn; (born January 15, 1985) is an American former professional football player who was a defensive tackle in the National Football League (NFL). He attended Crenshaw High School in Los Angeles. He played college football for the California Golden Bears. He was selected by the Seattle Seahawks in the third round of the 2007 NFL draft. He also played in the NFL for the San Diego / Los Angeles Chargers.

== College career ==
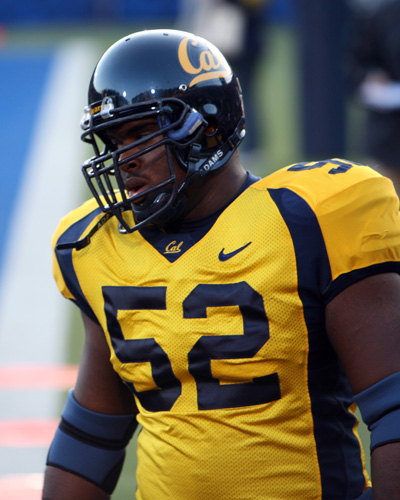
Mebane at California

Mebane played four seasons at the University of California, Berkeley, recording 109 tackles, 25.5 tackles for a loss, 14.5 sacks, one forced fumble, and one fumble recovery for the Golden Bears.

== Professional career ==
Pre-draft measurables
Height	Weight	Arm length	Hand span	40-yard dash	10-yard split	20-yard split	20-yard shuttle	Three-cone drill	Vertical jump	Broad jump	Bench press
6 ft 1 1/8 in (1.86 m)	309 lb (140 kg)	32 7/8 in (0.84 m)	10 in (0.25 m)	5.19 s	1.81 s	3.02 s	4.65 s	7.94 s	24.0 in (0.61 m)	8 ft 10 in (2.69 m)	24 reps
All values from NFL Combine

=== Seattle Seahawks ===
Mebane was selected by the Seattle Seahawks in the third round, 85th overall of the 2007 NFL draft, and on July 24, he signed a four-year contract. In his rookie season, he played all 16 games and recorded 29 tackles including two sacks. 2008 was a promising year for Mebane as he again played all 16 games and recorded 39 tackles, 5.5 sacks, and 2 forced fumbles. With the departure of Rocky Bernard, Mebane was expected to make a big impact for the Seahawks in 2009 in which he started 15 games and recorded 49 tackles and 1.5 sacks. For the 2010 season Mebane started the first four games but suffered a calf injury and was forced to sit out the next four games. In the first four games, he had 8 tackles and 1 sack.

Mebane was a constant in the middle and helped the 2013–2014 Seahawks defense reach dominant heights, as they had one of the best seasons in NFL history. The Seahawks eventually won Super Bowl XLVIII against the Denver Broncos, 43–8. Mebane, along with defensive linemen Red Bryant, center Max Unger and punter Jon Ryan, were the only four holdovers on the Super Bowl winning team roster from pre-Carroll/Schneider era.

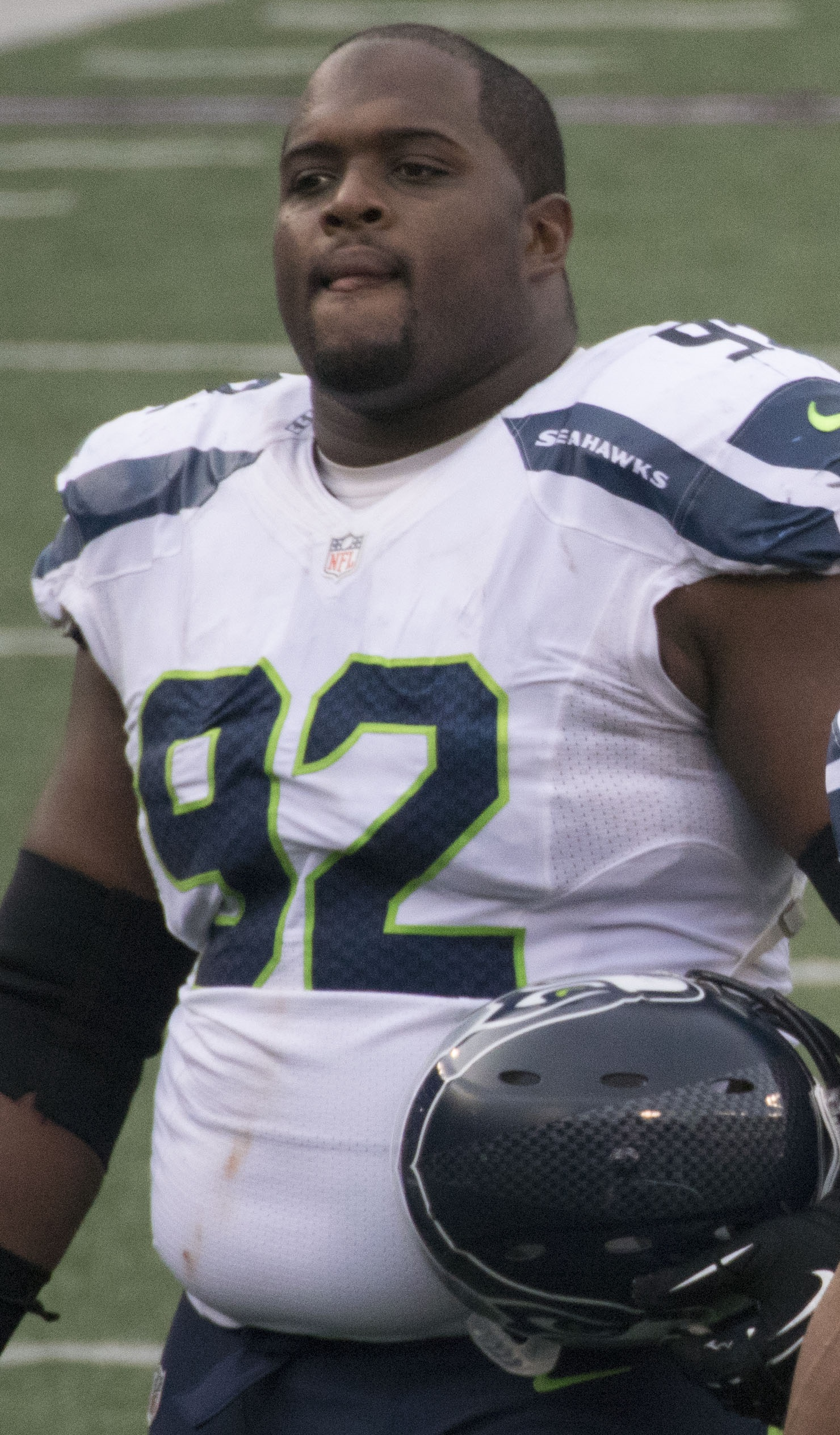
Mebane with the Seahawks in 2015.

Fellow Seahawks teammate Richard Sherman was quoted as saying of Mebane: "He's an incredibly technical player in his movements and everything he does. He's rarely out of position and he's rarely out of the play. You rarely see a defensive tackle running making tackles on the sideline, or [making] tackles on screen plays. He does all that. But once again, he's overlooked because I guess he's not a big sack-total guy. He's just a guy that does his job incredibly well week in and week out."

=== San Diego / Los Angeles Chargers ===
On March 9, 2016, Mebane signed a three-year contract with the San Diego Chargers.

On September 5, 2016, Mebane was named one of the San Diego Chargers team captains for the 2016 season. He was placed on injured reserve on November 14, 2016, with a torn bicep.

On March 13, 2019, Mebane re-signed with the Chargers on a two-year contract.

Mebane was released on March 13, 2020.

On November 20, 2020, Mebane announced his retirement from professional football.

== NFL career statistics ==
Legend
**Bold**	Career high

=== Regular season ===
Year	Team	Games		Tackles					Interceptions					Fumbles			
Year	Team	GP	GS	Cmb	Solo	Ast	Sck	TFL	Int	Yds	TD	Lng	PD	FF	FR	Yds	TD
2007	SEA	**16**	10	29	23	6	2.0	5	0	0	0	0	0	0	**2**	0	0
2008	SEA	**16**	**16**	39	29	10	**5.5**	**9**	0	0	0	0	1	**2**	0	0	0
2009	SEA	15	15	49	**41**	8	1.5	8	0	0	0	0	0	0	0	0	0
2010	SEA	12	12	31	19	12	1.0	7	0	0	0	0	2	0	0	0	0
2011	SEA	**16**	**16**	**56**	40	16	0.0	7	0	0	0	0	1	0	0	0	0
2012	SEA	**16**	**16**	**56**	31	**25**	3.0	4	0	0	0	0	**3**	0	1	0	0
2013	SEA	**16**	**16**	45	21	24	0.0	6	0	0	0	0	1	0	1	0	0
2014	SEA	9	9	20	11	9	1.0	5	0	0	0	0	0	0	0	0	0
2015	SEA	15	15	24	14	10	1.5	2	0	0	0	0	0	0	0	0	0
2016	SDG	10	10	21	17	4	1.0	4	**1**	**5**	0	**5**	1	0	0	0	0
2017	LAC	**16**	**16**	30	16	14	0.0	2	0	0	0	0	0	0	0	0	0
2018	LAC	12	12	40	22	18	1.0	3	0	0	0	0	1	1	0	0	0
2019	LAC	13	13	27	15	12	1.0	1	0	0	0	0	0	0	0	0	0
		182	176	467	299	168	18.5	63	1	5	0	5	10	3	4	0	0

=== Playoffs ===
Year	Team	Games		Tackles					Interceptions					Fumbles			
Year	Team	GP	GS	Cmb	Solo	Ast	Sck	TFL	Int	Yds	TD	Lng	PD	FF	FR	Yds	TD
2007	SEA	2	**2**	6	4	2	0.0	1	0	0	0	0	0	0	0	0	0
2010	SEA	2	**2**	**9**	**8**	1	0.0	**2**	0	0	0	0	0	0	0	0	0
2012	SEA	2	**2**	**9**	5	**4**	0.0	0	0	0	0	0	0	0	0	0	0
2013	SEA	**3**	**2**	8	5	3	0.0	1	0	0	0	0	0	0	0	0	0
2015	SEA	2	1	5	3	2	0.0	0	0	0	0	0	0	0	0	0	0
2018	LAC	1	1	5	5	0	0.0	0	0	0	0	0	0	0	0	0	0
		12	10	42	30	12	0.0	4	0	0	0	0	0	0	0	0	0
