= Josh Wilson (American football) =

American football player (born 1985)

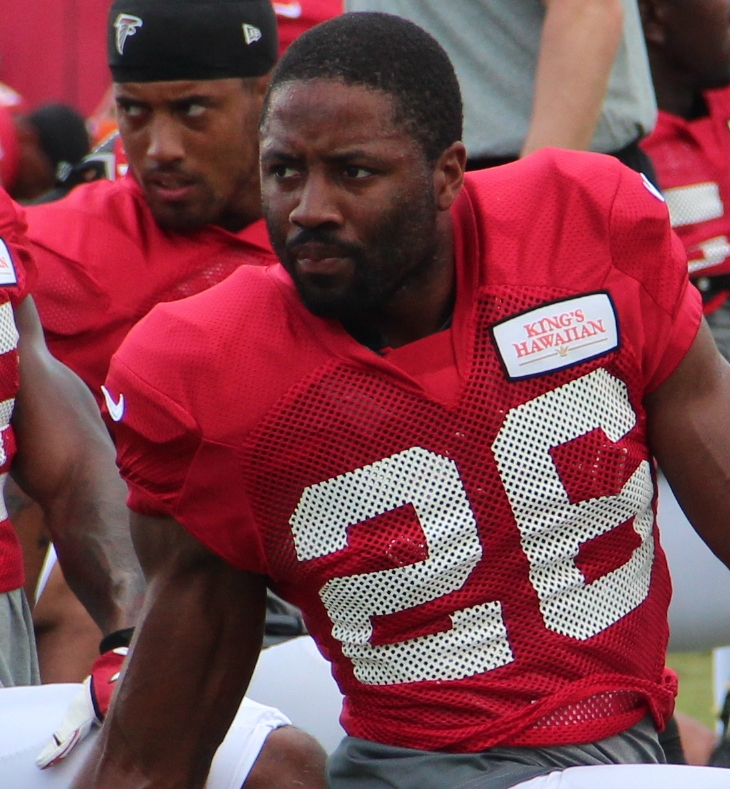
- Wilson with the Atlanta Falcons in 2014

No. 26, 37, 30
- Position: Cornerback

Personal information
- Born: March 11, 1985 (age 41); Houston, Texas, U.S.
- Listed height: 5 ft 9 in (1.75 m)
- Listed weight: 187 lb (85 kg)

Career information
- High school: DeMatha Catholic (Hyattsville, Maryland)
- College: Maryland
- NFL draft: 2007: 2nd round, 55th overall pick

Career history
- Seattle Seahawks (2007–2009); Baltimore Ravens (2010); Washington Redskins (2011–2013); Atlanta Falcons (2014); Detroit Lions (2015)

Awards and highlights
- NFL kickoff return yards leader (2008)

Career NFL statistics
- Total tackles: 460
- Sacks: 5.5
- Forced fumbles: 9
- Fumble recoveries: 12
- Interceptions: 15
- Total touchdowns: 6
- Stats at Pro Football Reference

Joshua Wilson (born March 11, 1985) is an American former professional football player who was a cornerback in the National Football League (NFL). He played college football for the Maryland Terrapins and was selected by the Seattle Seahawks in the second round of the 2007 NFL draft.

Wilson also played for the Baltimore Ravens, Washington Redskins, and Atlanta Falcons.

== Collegiate career ==
A graduate of DeMatha Catholic High School, Wilson saw action in all 11 games as a true freshman and became a starting cornerback late in his sophomore year, a job he never relinquished. By his senior season he was one of the top cornerbacks in the nation. He also had 847 yards as a kick returner in the 2006 season. In his career, he tallied 157 tackles, including 100 solo stops, had two career interceptions, 25 passes defended, forced two fumbles, recovered two fumbles, and blocked three kicks.

=== Track and field ===
Wilson also ran track at DeMatha Catholic High School, where he was a part of a school record-setting 4 × 100 metres relay team. He also set state records of 10.84 seconds in the 100 meters and 21.56 seconds in the 200 meters. He also competed in the 60 meters, posting a personal best time of 6.98 seconds.

== Professional career ==
=== 2007 NFL Combine ===
Pre-draft measurables
Height	Weight	Arm length	Hand span	40-yard dash	10-yard split	20-yard split	20-yard shuttle	Three-cone drill	Vertical jump	Broad jump	Bench press
5 ft 9 1/4 in (1.76 m)	189 lb (86 kg)	31 in (0.79 m)	9 1/4 in (0.23 m)	4.42 s	1.56 s	2.58 s	4.26 s	7.07 s	36.5 in (0.93 m)	10 ft 0 in (3.05 m)	20 reps
All values from NFL Combine/Pro Day

=== Seattle Seahawks ===
Wilson was drafted in second round with the 55th overall pick by the Seattle Seahawks in the 2007 NFL draft. During a week three home game against the Cincinnati Bengals, Wilson returned the opening kickoff 72 yards to help set up a Matt Hasselbeck touchdown pass to Bobby Engram. In week 12, against the St. Louis Rams, Josh Wilson returned an 89-yard kickoff return for a touchdown. He recorded 9 tackles in 12 games. On October 26, 2008, against the San Francisco 49ers Josh Wilson ran back a 75-yard interception for a touchdown. At the end of the 2008 season, Josh Wilson had 76 tackles, 4 interceptions (one returned for a touchdown), and 1 sack.

=== Baltimore Ravens ===
==== 2010 season ====
On August 31, 2010, he was traded to the Baltimore Ravens, for a conditional 2011 draft pick. Wilson returned an interception for a touchdown in overtime against the Houston Texans on December 13, 2010, to help the Ravens win 34-28. That was one of three interceptions that Wilson had in his lone season in Baltimore.

=== Washington Redskins ===
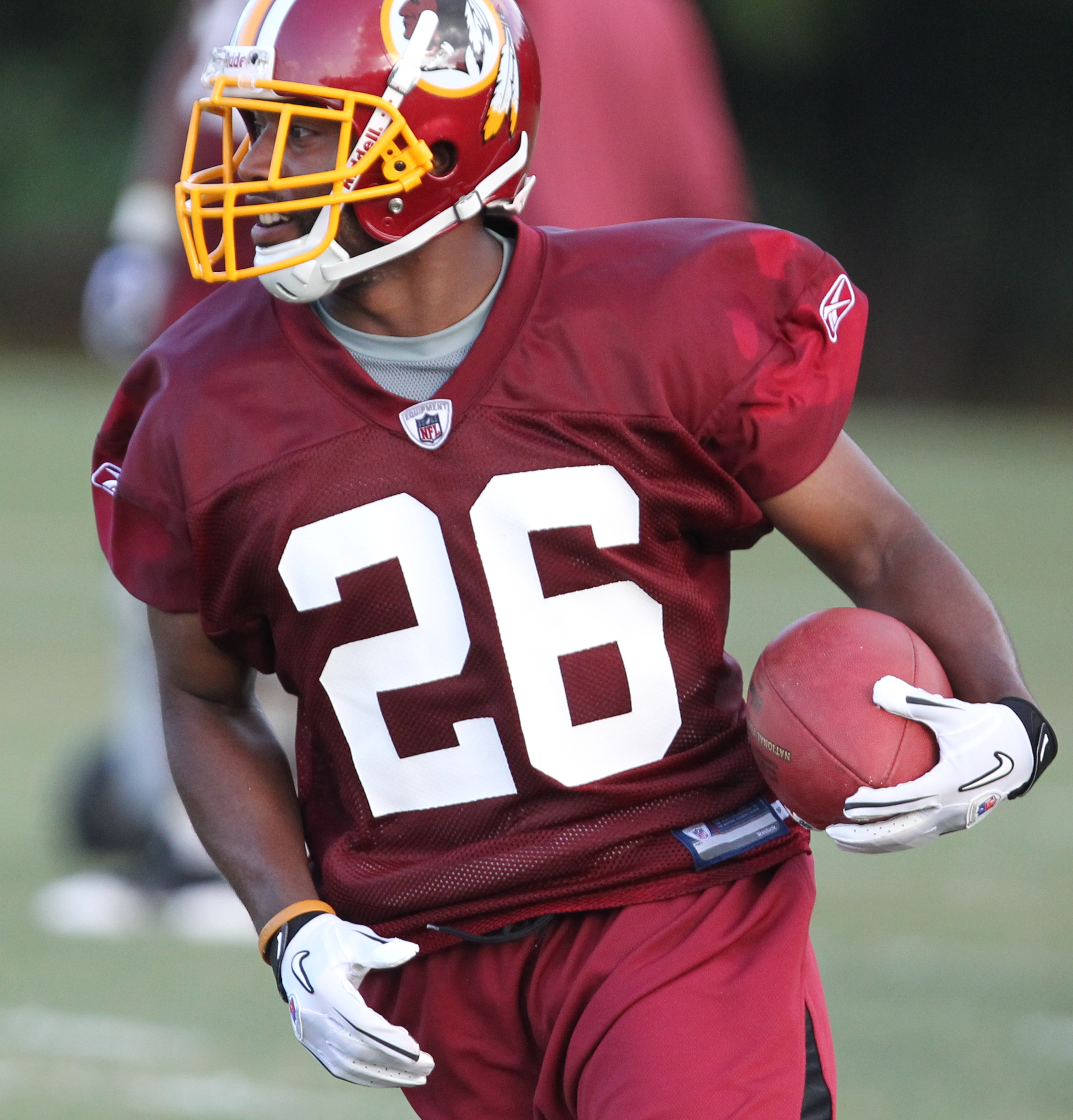
Wilson at Redskins training camp in 2011.

==== 2011 season ====
On July 27, 2011, Wilson signed with the Washington Redskins to a three-year, $13.5 million contract with $9 million guaranteed. He was made the starting right cornerback. Wilson made his first interception for the Redskins in the end zone in Week 14 against the New England Patriots. In Week 15 against the New York Giants, Wilson made his second interception of the season, which happened to also be in the end zone. In the 2011 season, Wilson started in all 16 games recording 62 combined tackles, 15 pass break-ups, two interceptions, and one forced fumble.

==== 2012 season ====
In the 2012 season, Wilson continued to be the starting right outside cornerback. In Week 2 against the St. Louis Rams, he recovered a fumble and returned the ball 30 yards for a touchdown after Perry Riley stripped the ball from Danny Amendola. Later in the third quarter, Wilson was forced to leave the game early due to suffering a concussion after tackling Rams runningback Daryl Richardson in the third quarter and preventing him from getting a touchdown. On September 19, 2012, he was officially cleared from his concussion and allowed to practice. In the Week 7 game against the New York Giants, he recorded his first interception of the season; making this the second time in a row he picked off Eli Manning since their last meeting in 2011. Wilson would manage to force a fumble, which was recovered by DeJon Gomes in a Week 12 win against the Dallas Cowboys on Thanksgiving.

==== 2013 season ====
In 2013, Wilson had a particularly poor performance against the San Francisco 49ers, where he lost several times to Anquan Boldin and Vernon Davis in one-on-one coverage.

=== Atlanta Falcons ===
==== 2014 season ====
On April 8, 2014, Wilson signed with the Atlanta Falcons on a one-year contract.

=== Detroit Lions ===
==== 2015 season ====
On April 3, 2015, Wilson signed a one-year contract with the Detroit Lions.

== NFL career statistics ==
Legend
	Led the league
**Bold**	Career high

=== Regular season ===
Year	Team	Games		Tackles					Interceptions					Fumbles			
Year	Team	GP	GS	Cmb	Solo	Ast	Sck	TFL	Int	Yds	TD	Lng	PD	FF	FR	Yds	TD
2007	SEA	12	0	10	8	2	0.0	0	0	0	0	0	0	0	1	0	0
2008	SEA	**16**	12	76	**69**	7	1.0	3	**4**	**135**	1	**75**	9	**3**	2	0	0
2009	SEA	12	12	45	41	4	1.0	2	2	126	**2**	65	13	0	1	**43**	0
2010	BAL	14	9	40	37	3	0.0	2	3	12	1	12	14	0	1	0	0
2011	WAS	**16**	**16**	62	48	14	0.0	0	2	0	0	0	**15**	1	1	4	0
2012	WAS	**16**	**16**	74	54	20	1.0	0	2	8	0	7	13	**3**	2	30	**1**
2013	WAS	**16**	**16**	**93**	68	**25**	**2.0**	**5**	1	0	0	0	7	2	**3**	1	0
2014	ATL	**16**	4	28	25	3	0.0	1	1	15	0	15	7	0	0	0	0
2015	DET	8	4	32	27	5	0.5	3	0	0	0	0	1	0	1	0	0
		126	89	460	377	83	5.5	16	15	296	4	75	79	9	12	78	1

=== Playoffs ===
Year	Team	Games		Tackles					Interceptions					Fumbles			
Year	Team	GP	GS	Cmb	Solo	Ast	Sck	TFL	Int	Yds	TD	Lng	PD	FF	FR	Yds	TD
2007	SEA	**2**	0	3	1	**2**	0.0	0	0	0	0	0	0	0	0	0	0
2010	BAL	**2**	**2**	4	**4**	0	0.0	0	**1**	0	0	0	**3**	0	0	0	0
2012	WAS	1	1	**5**	3	**2**	**1.0**	**1**	0	0	0	0	0	0	0	0	0
		5	3	12	8	4	1.0	1	1	0	0	0	3	0	0	0	0

== Personal life ==
Wilson's father, Tim Wilson, played in the NFL for eight years, mostly for the Houston Oilers. He was best friends with the legendary Earl Campbell, whom Josh calls "Uncle Earl". His father died in 1996, and Josh carries around a football card of him.

Wilson grew up as a fan of the Washington Redskins.
