= Maurice Morris =

American football player (born 1979)

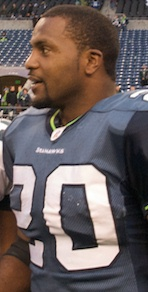
- Morris with the Seattle Seahawks in 2008

No. 20, 28
- Position: Running back

Personal information
- Born: December 1, 1979 (age 46); Chester, South Carolina, U.S.
- Listed height: 5 ft 11 in (1.80 m)
- Listed weight: 216 lb (98 kg)

Career information
- High school: Chester (Chester, South Carolina)
- College: Fresno CC (1998–1999); Oregon (2000–2001)
- NFL draft: 2002: 2nd round, 54th overall pick

Career history
- Seattle Seahawks (2002–2008); Detroit Lions (2009–2011)

Awards and highlights
- 2× Second-team All-Pac-10 (2000, 2001)

Career NFL statistics
- Rushing yards: 3,648
- Rushing average: 4.2
- Rushing touchdowns: 13
- Receptions: 151
- Receiving yards: 1,163
- Receiving touchdowns: 5
- Stats at Pro Football Reference

Maurice Autora Morris (born December 1, 1979) is an American former professional football player who was a running back in the National Football League (NFL). He played college football for the Oregon Ducks and was selected by the Seattle Seahawks in the second round of the 2002 NFL draft. He also played in the NFL for the Detroit Lions.

== Early life ==
Morris attended Chester High School in Chester, South Carolina. As a senior, he rushed for over 1,600 yards and 25 touchdowns. He holds several school records including: Most Yards Gained (3,708); Most Carries (593); Most Touchdowns Scored: (45); Most Points Scored: (298); and All-Purpose Yards Gained: (4,487).

Morris began his college career at Fresno City College in 1998. He then went to the University of Oregon, where he became the starting running back and helped the Ducks to a 2002 Fiesta Bowl victory. In the Fiesta Bowl, he ran for a highlight-reel 49-yard touchdown, during which he landed on top of a defender and got up without touching the ground.

== Professional career ==
=== Seattle Seahawks ===
Morris was the Seattle Seahawks primary kickoff returner between 2002 and 2004. He was consistent though unspectacular and was supplanted by Josh Scobey for kick returning duties in 2005. Morris saw limited action behind Shaun Alexander, the 2005 MVP, though his contributions did not go unnoticed by teammates. Alexander told the Seattle Times on August 17, 2006, that Morris could start for at least ten different teams in the NFL and could produce a thousand rushing yards and eight or nine touchdowns if given the opportunity.

In the 2005 playoffs when the Seahawks played the Washington Redskins, Alexander went out with a concussion and Morris filled in capably, helping the Seahawks to victory.

During the 2006 season, Alexander was out for 6 games and Morris filled in. He finished the season with 604 rushing yards playing all 16 regular season games. His best season to date is the 2007 season where he finished with 628 rushing yards and 4 rushing touchdowns and 1 receiving touchdown. He played 14 games during the regular season.

When the Seahawks signed Julius Jones and released Shaun Alexander prior to the 2008 season, it appeared Morris would be the backup again. While Jones did get more carries on the season (158 to Morris' 132), Morris arguably contributed more effectively to the Seahawks' running game. Consequently, Morris replaced Jones as the Seahawks' feature back during the latter part of the season. In the final 6 weeks of the season, Morris had 93 carries compared to Jones' 19.

=== Detroit Lions ===
On February 27, 2009, Morris signed a three-year, $7 million deal with the Detroit Lions.

== NFL career statistics ==
Legend
**Bold**	Career high

=== Regular season ===
Year	Team	Games		Rushing					Receiving				
Year	Team	GP	GS	Att	Yds	Avg	Lng	TD	Rec	Yds	Avg	Lng	TD
2002	SEA	11	0	32	153	4.8	24	0	3	25	8.3	12	0
2003	SEA	**16**	1	38	239	**6.3**	43	0	4	32	8.0	13	1
2004	SEA	15	0	30	126	4.2	12	0	9	53	5.9	12	0
2005	SEA	**16**	2	71	288	4.1	49	1	5	48	**9.6**	20	0
2006	SEA	**16**	**8**	**161**	604	3.8	29	0	11	46	4.2	27	0
2007	SEA	14	6	140	**628**	4.5	46	4	23	213	9.3	**34**	1
2008	SEA	13	6	132	574	4.3	45	0	19	136	7.2	13	**2**
2009	DET	14	3	93	384	4.1	**64**	2	**26**	210	8.1	19	0
2010	DET	14	7	90	336	3.7	26	**5**	25	170	6.8	16	0
2011	DET	**16**	5	80	316	4.0	31	1	**26**	**230**	8.8	16	1
		145	38	867	3,648	4.2	64	13	151	1,163	7.7	34	5

=== Playoffs ===
Year	Team	Games		Rushing					Receiving				
Year	Team	GP	GS	Att	Yds	Avg	Lng	TD	Rec	Yds	Avg	Lng	TD
2003	SEA	1	0	1	4	4.0	4	0	0	0	0.0	0	0
2004	SEA	1	0	2	9	**4.5**	5	0	0	0	0.0	0	0
2005	SEA	**3**	0	**25**	**73**	2.9	**10**	0	**2**	**22**	**11.0**	**16**	0
2006	SEA	2	0	7	23	3.3	7	0	0	0	0.0	0	0
2007	SEA	2	0	7	12	1.7	6	0	0	0	0.0	0	0
2011	DET	1	0	0	0	0.0	0	0	0	0	0.0	0	0
		10	0	42	121	2.9	10	0	2	22	11.0	16	0

== Personal life ==
Morris is the cousin of Chicago Bears linebacker D'Marco Jackson.
