= Leroy Hill =

American football player (born 1982)

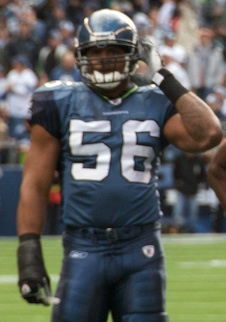
- Hill with the Seattle Seahawks in 2008

No. 56
- Position: Linebacker

Personal information
- Born: September 14, 1982 (age 44); Haddock, Georgia, U.S.
- Listed height: 6 ft 1 in (1.85 m)
- Listed weight: 238 lb (108 kg)

Career information
- High school: Baldwin (Milledgeville, Georgia)
- College: Clemson
- NFL draft: 2005: 3rd round, 98th overall pick

Career history
- Seattle Seahawks (2005−2012)

Awards and highlights
- Third-team All-American (2004); ACC Defensive Player of the Year (2004); 2× First-team All-ACC (2003, 2004)

Career NFL statistics
- Total tackles: 512
- Sacks: 20
- Forced fumbles: 7
- Fumble recoveries: 2
- Pass deflections: 11
- Defensive touchdowns: 1
- Stats at Pro Football Reference

Leroy Hill Jr. (born September 14, 1982) is an American former professional football player who was a linebacker in the National Football League (NFL). He was selected by the Seattle Seahawks in the third round of the 2005 NFL draft after playing college football for the Clemson Tigers.

== Early life ==
Hill played high school football in Milledgeville, Georgia for the Baldwin High School Braves.

== Professional career ==
Pre-draft measurables
Height	Weight	Arm length	Hand span	40-yard dash	10-yard split	20-yard split	20-yard shuttle	Three-cone drill	Vertical jump	Broad jump	Bench press
6 ft 1 in (1.85 m)	229 lb (104 kg)	32 5/8 in (0.83 m)	9 3/4 in (0.25 m)	4.74 s	1.67 s	2.75 s	4.10 s	7.23 s	34.0 in (0.86 m)	9 ft 8 in (2.95 m)	25 reps
All values from NFL Combine

Injuries to starting veteran linebacker Jamie Sharper put Hill into the starting lineup in his rookie year; he totaled 72 tackles and 7.5 sacks from the outside linebacker position. In the 2009 offseason, Hill was tagged as the Seahawks franchise player. The Seahawks removed the franchise tag on Hill on April 26, 2009, making him a free agent because the Seahawks drafted highly touted Wake Forest linebacker Aaron Curry at number 4 overall in the 2009 NFL draft. However, several days later, on April 30, 2009, Hill re-signed with the Seahawks on a 6-year, $38 million contract.

== NFL career statistics ==
Legend
**Bold**	Career high

=== Regular season ===
Year	Team	Games		Tackles					Interceptions					Fumbles			
Year	Team	GP	GS	Cmb	Solo	Ast	Sck	TFL	Int	Yds	TD	Lng	PD	FF	FR	Yds	TD
2005	SEA	15	9	73	52	21	**7.5**	**11**	0	0	0	0	2	1	0	0	0
2006	SEA	15	15	**92**	**70**	22	2.0	2	0	0	0	0	2	1	**1**	4	0
2007	SEA	14	14	81	58	**23**	3.0	6	0	0	0	0	**4**	**3**	**1**	**20**	**1**
2008	SEA	12	12	84	63	21	1.0	8	0	0	0	0	3	0	0	0	0
2009	SEA	11	11	46	37	9	1.0	4	0	0	0	0	0	0	0	0	0
2010	SEA	1	0	0	0	0	0.0	0	0	0	0	0	0	0	0	0	0
2011	SEA	**16**	**16**	89	68	21	4.0	8	0	0	0	0	0	1	0	0	0
2012	SEA	13	12	47	31	16	1.5	2	0	0	0	0	0	1	0	0	0
Total		97	89	512	379	133	20.0	41	0	0	0	0	11	7	2	24	1

=== Playoffs ===
Year	Team	Games		Tackles					Interceptions					Fumbles			
Year	Team	GP	GS	Cmb	Solo	Ast	Sck	TFL	Int	Yds	TD	Lng	PD	FF	FR	Yds	TD
2005	SEA	**3**	**3**	23	17	**6**	0.0	1	0	0	0	0	0	0	0	0	0
2006	SEA	2	2	17	12	5	0.0	1	0	0	0	0	0	0	0	0	0
2007	SEA	2	2	**24**	**21**	3	**2.0**	**2**	0	0	0	0	0	**1**	0	0	0
2012	SEA	2	2	8	3	5	0.0	0	0	0	0	0	0	0	0	0	0
Total		9	9	72	53	19	2.0	4	0	0	0	0	0	1	0	0	0

== Legal issues ==
In January 2009, Hill was arrested in Atlanta for marijuana possession after police found him passed out behind the wheel of his car at an intersection. On April 11, 2010, Hill was arrested on suspicion of domestic abuse in Issaquah, WA when he hit his girlfriend leaving "obvious injuries" according to the Issaquah Police Department. In August 2010, a court decided that the case would be dismissed if he completed a one-year domestic-violence treatment program, had no law violations and possessed no weapons in the next 18 months.

Hill was arrested on February 24, 2012, on a possession of marijuana charge, after a search warrant was served at his Buckhead residence. The charges were dropped on March 5, 2012, after a urine test taken after the arrest came up negative. In January 2013, Hill was arrested and charged with unlawful imprisonment and third-degree assault relating to a domestic violence incident. In May 2013, the prosecutor's office said the case was insufficient as a felony.
