= Will Heller =

American football player (born 1981)

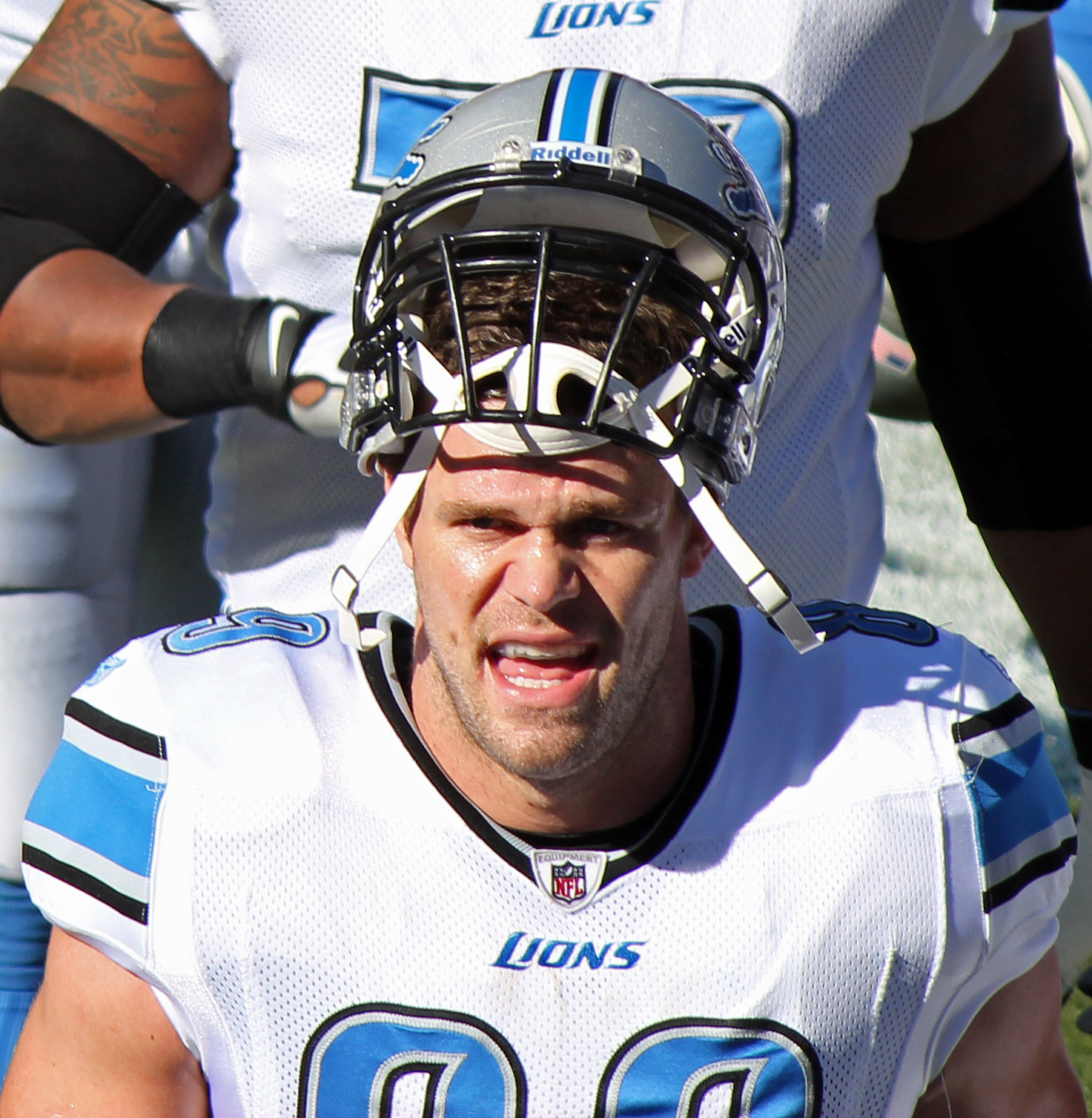
- Heller with the Lions in 2011

No. 89, 85
- Position: Tight end

Personal information
- Born: February 28, 1981 (age 45); Dunwoody, Georgia, U.S.
- Listed height: 6 ft 6 in (1.98 m)
- Listed weight: 275 lb (125 kg)

Career information
- High school: Marist (Atlanta, Georgia)
- College: Georgia Tech (1999–2002)
- NFL draft: 2003: undrafted

Career history
- Tampa Bay Buccaneers (2003−2004); Miami Dolphins (2005); Tampa Bay Buccaneers (2005); Seattle Seahawks (2006−2008); Detroit Lions (2009−2012)

Career NFL statistics
- Receptions: 92
- Receiving yards: 782
- Receiving touchdowns: 12
- Stats at Pro Football Reference

Will Sanders Heller (born February 28, 1981) is an American former professional football player who was a tight end in the National Football League (NFL). He played college football for the Georgia Tech Yellow Jackets and was signed as an undrafted free agent by the Tampa Bay Buccaneers in 2003.

Heller also played for the Miami Dolphins, Seattle Seahawks, and Detroit Lions.

== Early life ==
Heller attended Marist High School in Atlanta, Georgia, and was a student and a letterman in both football and basketball. In football, he played tight end, wide receiver, and defensive back, and was a 2nd Team All-Northside selection under Marist head football coach Alan Chadwick.

== College career ==
Heller attended Georgia Tech in Atlanta, where he played tight end under Coach George O'Leary. Heller arrived at Georgia Tech as a walk-on candidate for tight end after turning down his only football scholarship offer to Division I-AA Furman.

== Professional career ==
=== Tampa Bay Buccaneers (first stint) ===
Heller signed with the Tampa Bay Buccaneers on May 5, 2003, after going undrafted in the 2003 NFL draft. He played in nine games, starting one, in 2003, catching two passes for 15 yards and one touchdown. He appeared in 10 games, starting two, during the 2004 season, recording 12 receptions for 98 yards and one touchdown. Heller was placed on injured reserve on December 13, 2004. He re-signed with the Buccaneers on April 29, 2005. He was waived on September 3, 2005.

=== Miami Dolphins ===
Heller was claimed off waivers by the Miami Dolphins on September 4, 2005. He played in seven games for the Dolphins in 2005, catching one pass for one yard and a touchdown. He was waived on November 5, 2005.

=== Tampa Bay Buccaneers (second stint) ===
Heller signed with the Buccaneers on December 20, 2005.

=== Seattle Seahawks ===
Heller was signed by the Seattle Seahawks on March 24, 2006. He appeared in all 16 games for the Seahawks in 2006, totaling four receptions for 32 yards and one touchdown.

He re-signed with the team on March 5, 2007. Heller played in 16 games, starting six, during the 2007 season, catching 13, passes for 82 yards and three touchdowns. Two of his touchdowns were in one game against the St. Louis Rams.

Heller appeared in 12 games in 2008, recording four passes for 29 yards.

=== Detroit Lions ===
Heller was signed by the Detroit Lions on March 16, 2009. He played in 16 games, starting a career high nine games, for the Lions in 2009, totaling 29 catches for 296 yards and three touchdowns.

Heller re-signed with the team on March 8, 2010. He appeared in 16 games, starting five, during the 2010 season, recording four receptions for 37 yards and one touchdown. Heller played in 16 games, starting seven, in 2011, catching six passes for 42 yards.

He was released following the 2011 season on March 12, 2012, but re-signed on March 22, 2012. He appeared in all 16 games for the fourth straight season in 2012, totaling 17 receptions for 150 yards and one touchdown.
