= Mansfield Wrotto =

Liberian gridiron football player (born 1984)

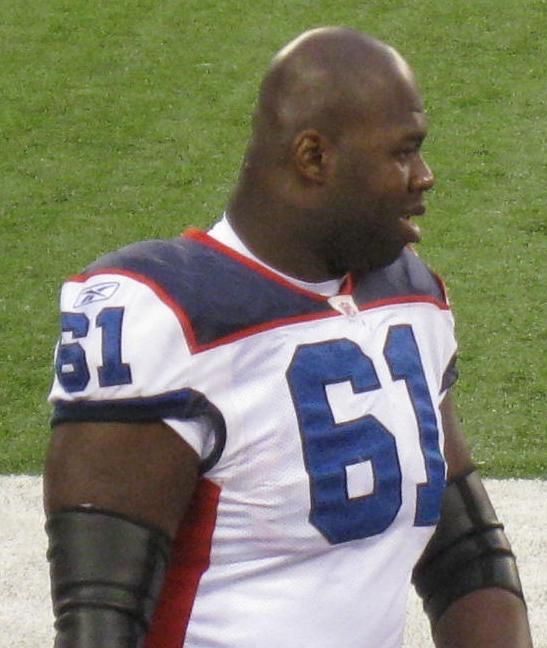
- Wrotto with the Bills in January 2011

No. 66, 61
- Position: Guard

Personal information
- Born: October 12, 1984 (age 42); Liberia
- Listed height: 6 ft 3 in (1.91 m)
- Listed weight: 320 lb (145 kg)

Career information
- High school: Snellville (GA) Brookwood
- College: Georgia Tech
- NFL draft: 2007: 4th round, 124th overall pick

Career history
- Seattle Seahawks (2007–2010); Buffalo Bills (2010); Chicago Bears (2011)

Career NFL statistics
- Games played: 16
- Games started: 5
- Stats at Pro Football Reference

Mansfield Chell Wrotto, Jr. /ˈrɒtoʊ/ (born October 12, 1984) is a Liberian former American football guard who played in the National Football League (NFL). He was drafted by the Seattle Seahawks in the fourth round of the 2007 NFL draft. He played college football at Georgia Tech.

== College career ==
Wrotto played defensive tackle for three years, before moving to offensive tackle in his senior year. In his four seasons at Georgia Tech, he only missed five games. He played in the Senior Bowl.

== Professional career ==
=== Seattle Seahawks ===
Wrotto was drafted by the Seahawks in the fourth round of the 2007 NFL draft, 124th overall. He was the first Georgia Tech player taken by Seattle in the draft since 1999 (Charlie Rogers). Though he played offensive tackle in college, he switched to guard for the Seahawks.

He was waived by the Seahawks on September 28, 2010.

=== Buffalo Bills ===
Wrotto was signed to the Buffalo Bills' practice squad on October 1 and signed to the active roster on October 4, 2010.

=== Chicago Bears ===
Wrotto was signed by the Chicago Bears on December 27, 2011.

On June 14, 2012, Wrotto was released by the Bears.

== Personal ==
Wrotto graduated from Brookwood High School in Snellville, Ga, and then went on to attend Georgia Tech. At Georgia Tech he majored in management. His parents are Mansfield Sr. and Jemmie.

Wrotto completed an MBA program at the University of Illinois at Urbana-Champaign and is currently a senior vice president at Bank of America.
