= 2005 Seattle Seahawks season =

American football team season

- Owner: Paul Allen
- General manager: Tim Ruskell
- Head coach: Mike Holmgren
- Home stadium: Qwest Field

Results
- Record: 13–3
- Division place: 1st NFC West
- Conference place: 1st NFC
- Playoffs: Won Divisional Playoffs (vs. Redskins) 20–10; Won NFC Championship (vs. Panthers) 34–14; Lost Super Bowl XL (vs. Steelers) 10–21
- All-Pros: RB Shaun Alexander (1st team); FB Mack Strong (1st team); OT Walter Jones (1st team); OG Steve Hutchinson (1st team)
- Pro Bowlers: QB Matt Hasselbeck; RB Shaun Alexander; OT Walter Jones; OG Steve Hutchinson; FB Mack Strong; C Robbie Tobeck; LB Lofa Tatupu

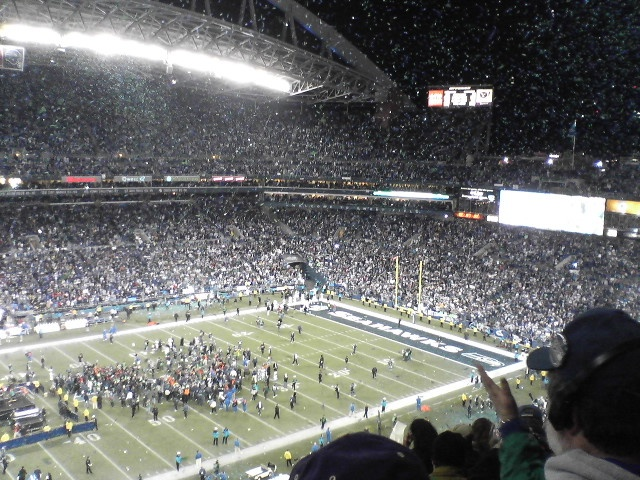
Celebrations following the Seahawks' qualification to the Super Bowl after defeating the Panthers in the NFC Championship

The 2005 Seattle Seahawks season was the franchise's 30th season in the National Football League (NFL), their fourth playing their home games at Qwest Field and their seventh season under head coach Mike Holmgren. They advanced to the National Football Conference (NFC) Championship Game, which was the first one for the franchise in 22 years, and they defeated the Carolina Panthers 34–14. In Super Bowl XL, they lost 21–10 to the Pittsburgh Steelers. The Seahawks compiled a 13–3 record in the regular season, easily winning the NFC West, a first round bye, and homefield advantage in the NFC playoffs as the top seed for the first time in franchise history. There, they beat the Washington Redskins and Carolina Panthers to win the George Halas Trophy, and advance to their first ever Super Bowl. Combining the regular season and playoffs, the Seahawks finished with a perfect 10–0 record at Qwest Field. The 2005 team was widely considered the best team in club history until the Super Bowl XLVIII championship. The 2005 season was also the team's 30th anniversary season in the NFL. The Seahawks were the only NFC team from the 2004 playoffs to qualify for the 2005 playoffs.

The Seahawks touted Pro Bowlers on offense, and boasted season MVP, running back Shaun Alexander, who would eventually break Priest Holmes's season touchdown record, with 28 total touchdowns. Alexander also led the league in rushing yards for the second consecutive year, which in turn helped the Seahawks lead the league in scoring. The offense was led by 7th-year veteran quarterback Matt Hasselbeck, who had a 98.2 passer rating, while completing 65.5% of his passes, earning his second trip to the Pro Bowl. Future Hall of Famers Walter Jones and Steve Hutchinson anchored the offensive line at left tackle and guard respectively, and Mack Strong effectively blocked and rushed from the backfield at fullback on his way to a 2005 All-Pro Team selection. The team scored a franchise record 452 points, a record that stood until the 2025 team surpassed it with 481 points scored.

Although Seattle's strength was attributed to their offense, they were strong on the defensive side of the ball as well. The Seahawks compiled an NFL-leading 50 quarterback sacks, with defensive end Bryce Fisher leading the franchise with nine, while defensive tackle Rocky Bernard added 8.5 and veteran defensive end Grant Wistrom recorded four. Despite starting two rookies at linebacker for most of the year, the Seattle linebacking corps played well, led by Pro Bowler Lofa Tatupu, who topped the team with 104 tackles and added four sacks, three interceptions, and one fumble recovery. In the secondary, Michael Boulware led the team with four interceptions and also tallied two sacks and one fumble recovery, however Seattle suffered injuries throughout the year, notably to free safety Ken Hamlin. A bright spot in relief, second-year cornerback Jordan Babineaux played well as he appeared in all sixteen games for Seattle, intercepting three passes and making 61 tackles. For the season, the Seahawks defense ranked 7th in points allowed, surrendering just 271 total, 181 fewer than the Seahawks offense scored.

== Offseason ==
The period between the disappointing 2004 season and the start of the 2005 season was marked by major changes for the Seahawks, starting with the front office. Team owner Paul Allen fired eight-year incumbent General Manager Bob Whitsitt on January 14, the same day that Vice President of Football Operations Ted Thompson was hired away by the Green Bay Packers to be their general manager. Rumors had been floating that Whitsitt's relationship with coach Mike Holmgren (and almost everyone else) was strained and Holmgren later admitted that he had thought about leaving the team after a 2004 season that was personally draining. At the time of Whitsitt's firing the Seahawks salary cap situation was in extreme flux with 16 unsigned free agents on the roster including their three biggest stars Matt Hasselbeck, Shaun Alexander and Walter Jones. On February 3 Mike Reinfeldt, who had previously been pushed out of the Seahawks organization by Whitsitt, was hired back as a consultant to try to sort out the mess. Reinfeldt was able to sign Jones and Hasselbeck to long-term deals and put the Franchise Tag on Alexander, setting the stage for the rest of the offseason. Bob Ferguson eventually resigned from his general manager position as well.

After a careful executive search the Seahawks settled on highly regarded personnel man Tim Ruskell as the new President of Football Operations on February 23, 2005. As a part of his roster overhaul, Ruskell subsequently released or neglected to re-sign six players (Anthony Simmons, Chad Brown, Orlando Huff, Chike Okeafor, Rashad Moore and Cedric Woodard) who were starters on an underperforming defense during the 2004 season. Over the rest of the offseason and into training camp Ruskell signed a raft of free agents to replace departed players on both sides of the ball, emphasizing character and work ethic in his evaluations.

In the first round of the 2005 NFL draft the Seahawks traded down from pick 23 to pick 26 to take center Chris Spencer from the University of Mississippi and acquire an extra fourth-round pick. They then gave up two fourth round picks to trade up into the second round and select USC linebacker Lofa Tatupu, who would start every game of the 2005 season and go to the Pro Bowl as a rookie.

=== NFL draft ===
2005 Seattle Seahawks draft
Round	Pick	Player	Position	College	Notes
1	26	Chris Spencer	Center	Mississippi	
2	45	Lofa Tatupu *	Linebacker	USC	
3	85	David Greene	Quarterback	Georgia	
3	98	Leroy Hill	Linebacker	Clemson	
4	105	Ray Willis	Offensive tackle	Florida State	
5	159	Jeb Huckeba	Defensive end	Arkansas	
6	196	Tony Jackson	Running back	Iowa	
7	235	Cornelius Wortham	Linebacker	Alabama	
7	254	Doug Nienhuis	Offensive Guard	Oregon State	
Made roster † Pro Football Hall of Fame * Made at least one Pro Bowl during career

=== Undrafted free agents ===
2005 undrafted free agents of note
Player	Position	College
Brian Wrobel	Quarterback	Winona State

== Personnel ==
=== Staff / Coaches ===
2005 Seattle Seahawks staff
**Front Office**: Chairman – Paul Allen; President / Chief Executive Officer (CEO) - Tod Leiweke; President of Football Operations – Tim Ruskell; Executive Vice President of Football Operations/General Manager – Mike Holmgren; Senior Vice President – Mike Reinfeldt; Vice President of Football Operations – Ted Thompson; General Manager - Bob Ferguson; Director of Player Personnel – John Schneider; Director of Pro Personnel – Will Lewis; Assistant Director of Player Personnel / Pro Scout - Lake Dawson; Director of College Scouting (Eastern Region) – Scott Fitterer; Director of College Scouting (Western Region) – Mike Yowarsky; Scouting Assistant - Chris Culmer; Football Operations Coordinator / Team Travel - Bill Nayes; Chief Financial Officer - Martha Fuller; **Head Coaches**: Head Coach – Mike Holmgren; Assistant Head Coach/Offensive Line – Tom Lovat; Area Scout - Scott Fitterer; Bill Walsh Diversity Coaching Fellowship - Grady Brown	**Offensive Coaches**: Offensive Coordinator – Gil Haskell; Quarterbacks – Jim Zorn; Running Backs – Stump Mitchell; Wide Receivers – Nolan Cromwell; Tight Ends – Jim Lind; Offensive Line - Bill Laveroni; Quality Control / Offensive Assistant – Gary Reynolds; Offensive Consultant - Keith Gilbertson; **Defensive Coaches**: Defensive Coordinator – Ray Rhodes; Defensive Line – Dwaine Board; Assistant Quality Control / Defensive Line - Zerick Rollins; Linebackers – John Marshall; Defensive Backs – Teryl Austin; **Special Teams Coaches**: Special Teams Coordinator – Bob Casullo; **Strength and Conditioning**: Strength and Conditioning – Mike Clark; Assistant Strength and Conditioning – Darren Krein

=== Final roster ===
2005 Seattle Seahawks roster
**Quarterbacks (QB)**: 11 David Greene; **8** Matt Hasselbeck; 15 Seneca Wallace; **Running backs (RB)**: **37** Shaun Alexander; 20 Maurice Morris; 39 Josh Scobey; **38** Mack Strong FB; 43 Leonard Weaver FB; **Wide receivers (WR)**: **84** Bobby Engram; 18 D. J. Hackett; **82** Darrell Jackson; 87 Joe Jurevicius; 81 Peter Warrick; **Tight ends (TE)**: 83 Ryan Hannam; 88 Itula Mili; **86** Jerramy Stevens	**Offensive linemen (OL)**: **62** Chris Gray G; 73 Wayne Hunter RT; **76** Steve Hutchinson G; **71** Walter Jones LT; **75** Sean Locklear RT; 65 Chris Spencer C; **61** Robbie Tobeck C; 74 Ray Willis RT; 77 Floyd Womack G; **Defensive linemen (DL)**: 95 Rodney Bailey DE; **99** Rocky Bernard DT; **91** Chuck Darby DT; **94** Bryce Fisher DE; 92 Alain Kashama DE; 69 Joe Tafoya DE; 93 Craig Terrill DT; 90 Marcus Tubbs DT; **98** Grant Wistrom DE	**Linebackers (LB)**: 57 Kevin Bentley OLB; **56** Leroy Hill OLB; 58 Isaiah Kacyvenski OLB; 53 Niko Koutouvides MLB; **54** D. D. Lewis OLB; **51** Lofa Tatupu MLB; 50 Cornelius Wortham MLB; **Defensive backs (DB)**: 27 Jordan Babineaux CB; **28** Michael Boulware SS; 21 Andre Dyson CB; 25 Michael Harden CB; **31** Kelly Herndon CB; **33** Marquand Manuel FS; 35 Etric Pruitt FS; **23** Marcus Trufant CB; 22 Jimmy Williams CB; **Special teams (ST)**: 3 Josh Brown K; 52 J.P. Darche LS; 16 Tom Rouen P	**Practice squad**: 70 Nathaniel Adibi DE; 14 Tony Brown WR; 29 Brandon Haw CB; 66 William Henry G; 17 Maurice Mann WR; 72 Bryant McNeal DE; 78 Robert Pollard DE; 30 Marquis Weeks RB; **Reserve**: 85 Alex Bannister WR (IR); 26 Ken Hamlin FS (NF-Inj.); 60 Joey Hollenbeck G (IR); 40 John Howell S (IR); 97 Jeb Huckeba DE (IR); 55 Jamie Sharper MLB (IR); 64 Ron Smith DT (IR); 89 Jerheme Urban WR (IR); Rookies in italics 53 active, 8 reserve, 8 practice squad

- Starters in bold.

== Awards and records ==
- Shaun Alexander, Bert Bell Award and NFL MVP.

== Schedule ==
=== Preseason ===
Week	Date	Opponent	Result	Record	Game site	Recap
1	August 12	at New Orleans Saints	**W** 34–15	1–0	Louisiana Superdome	Recap
2	August 22	Dallas Cowboys	**L** 10–18	1–1	Qwest Field	Recap
3	August 27	at Kansas City Chiefs	**W** 23–17	2–1	Arrowhead Stadium	Recap
4	September 2	Minnesota Vikings	**L** 21–23	2–2	Qwest Field	Recap

=== Regular season ===
Week	Date	Opponent	Result	Record	Game site	Recap
1	September 11	at Jacksonville Jaguars	**L** 14–26	0–1	Alltel Stadium	Recap
2	September 18	Atlanta Falcons	**W** 21–18	1–1	Qwest Field	Recap
3	September 25	**Arizona Cardinals**	**W** 37–12	2–1	Qwest Field	Recap
4	October 2	at Washington Redskins	**L** 17–20 (OT)	2–2	FedExField	Recap
5	October 9	at **St. Louis Rams**	**W** 37–31	3–2	Edward Jones Dome	Recap
6	October 16	Houston Texans	**W** 42–10	4–2	Qwest Field	Recap
7	October 23	Dallas Cowboys	**W** 13–10	5–2	Qwest Field	Recap
8	Bye					
9	November 6	at **Arizona Cardinals**	**W** 33–19	6–2	Sun Devil Stadium	Recap
10	November 13	**St. Louis Rams**	**W** 31–16	7–2	Qwest Field	Recap
11	November 20	at **San Francisco 49ers**	**W** 27–25	8–2	Monster Park	Recap
12	November 27	New York Giants	**W** 24–21 (OT)	9–2	Qwest Field	Recap
13	December 5	at Philadelphia Eagles	**W** 42–0	10–2	Lincoln Financial Field	Recap
14	December 11	**San Francisco 49ers**	**W** 41–3	11–2	Qwest Field	Recap
15	December 18	at Tennessee Titans	**W** 28–24	12–2	The Coliseum	Recap
16	December 24	Indianapolis Colts	**W** 28–13	13–2	Qwest Field	Recap
17	January 1	at Green Bay Packers	**L** 17–23	13–3	Lambeau Field	Recap

Bold indicates division opponents.
Source: 2005 NFL season results

=== Postseason ===
Round	Date	Opponent (seed)	Result	Record	Game site	Recap
Wild Card	First-round bye					
Divisional	January 14, 2006	Washington Redskins (6)	**W** 20–10	1–0	Qwest Field	Recap
NFC Championship	January 22, 2006	Carolina Panthers (5)	**W** 34–14	2–0	Qwest Field	Recap
Super Bowl XL	February 5, 2006	vs. Pittsburgh Steelers (A6)	**L** 10–21	2–1	Ford Field	Recap

== Standings ==
NFC West
	W	L	T	PCT	DIV	CONF	PF	PA	STK
^{(1)} Seattle Seahawks	13	3	0	.813	6–0	10–2	452	271	L1
St. Louis Rams	6	10	0	.375	1–5	3–9	363	429	W1
Arizona Cardinals	5	11	0	.313	3–3	4–8	311	387	L1
San Francisco 49ers	4	12	0	.250	2–4	3–9	239	428	W2

== Game summaries ==
=== Preseason ===
==== Week P1: at New Orleans Saints ====
Preseason Week One: Seattle Seahawks at New Orleans Saints – Game summary

Quarter	1	2	3	4	Total
Seahawks	7	17	3	7	34
Saints	3	0	7	5	15

at Superdome, New Orleans, Louisiana

- Date: August 12
- Game time: 7:05pm local
- Game weather: indoors
- Game attendance: 38,529
- Referee: Jeff Triplette
- TV announcers (KONG): Verne Lundquist, Warren Moon
- Gamecenter, Gamebook

==== Week P2: vs. Dallas Cowboys ====
Preseason Week Two: Seattle Seahawks vs. Dallas Cowboys – Game summary

Quarter	1	2	3	4	Total
Cowboys	3	7	6	2	18
Seahawks	7	0	0	3	10

at Qwest Field, Seattle

- Date: August 22
- Game time: 5:08pm local
- Game weather: clear, 74 °F (23 °C), 46% humidity, wind variable 3 miles per hour (4.8 km/h)
- Game attendance: 47,641
- Referee: Tony Corrente
- TV: ABC
- Gamecenter, Gamebook

==== Week P3: at Kansas City Chiefs ====
Preseason Week Three: Seattle Seahawks at Kansas City Chiefs – Game summary

Quarter	1	2	3	4	Total
Seahawks	7	3	10	3	23
Chiefs	7	7	0	3	17

at Arrowhead Stadium, Kansas City, Missouri

- Date: August 27
- Game time: 7:30pm local
- Game weather: clear, 87 °F (31 °C), 49% humidity, wind S 8 miles per hour (13 km/h)
- Game attendance: 74,158
- Referee: Larry Nemmers
- TV: KONG
- Gamecenter, Gamebook

==== Week P4: vs. Minnesota Vikings ====
Preseason Week Four: Seattle Seahawks vs. Minnesota Vikings – Game summary

Quarter	1	2	3	4	Total
Vikings	7	3	0	13	23
Seahawks	7	0	7	7	21

at Qwest Field, Seattle

- Date: September 2
- Game time: 6:07pm local
- Game weather: clear, 70 °F (21 °C), 53% humidity, wind NNW 6 miles per hour (9.7 km/h)
- Game attendance: 63,746
- Referee: Pete Morelli
- TV: KONG
- Gamecenter, Gamebook

=== Regular season ===
- The Seahawks got off to a rocky start on their 2005 (30th Anniversary) campaign but it would end with their first Super Bowl appearance.
- When the St. Louis Rams lost on December 4, 2005, the Seahawks clinched their second straight NFC West title after playing only 11 games.
- At the end of the regular season, the Seahawks' use of the 12th man was challenged by Texas A&M University, who holds a trademark of the phrase. The dispute was settled out of court on May 8, 2006 with an agreement that the Seahawks be permitted to continue use of the slogan with acknowledgment to Texas A&M.

==== Week 1: at Jacksonville Jaguars ====
Week One: Seattle Seahawks at Jacksonville Jaguars – Game summary

Quarter	1	2	3	4	Total
Seahawks	0	14	0	0	14
Jaguars	6	7	7	6	26

at Alltel Stadium, Jacksonville, Florida

- Date: September 11
- Game time: 1:07pm local
- Game weather: 82 °F (28 °C), 58% humidity, wind N 7 miles per hour (11 km/h)
- Game attendance: 65,204
- Referee: Ed Hochuli
- TV announcers (Fox): Craig Shemon, Erik Kramer, Lee Gordon
- Gamecenter, Gamebook

Game information

First quarter

- JAX – Josh Scobee 23-yard field goal, 11:03 (JAX 3–0)
- JAX – Josh Scobee 41-yard field goal, 3:49 (JAX 6–0)

Second quarter

- SEA – Joe Jurevicius 33-yard pass from Matt Hasselbeck (Josh Brown kick), 14:52 (SEA 7–6)
- JAX – Jimmy Smith 30-yard pass from Byron Leftwich (Josh Scobee kick), 4:17 (JAX 13–6)
- SEA – Darrell Jackson 9-yard pass from Matt Hasselbeck (Josh Brown kick), 0:47 (SEA 14–13)

Third quarter

- JAX – Jimmy Smith 7-yard pass from Byron Leftwich (Josh Scobee kick), 8:39 (JAX 20–14)

Fourth quarter

- JAX – Josh Scobee 29-yard field goal, 4:32 (JAX 23–14)
- JAX – Josh Scobee 41-yard field goal, 1:55 (JAX 26–14)

Top passers

- SEA – Matt Hasselbeck: 21/36, 246 yds, 2 TD, 2 INT
- JAX – Byron Leftwich: 17/31, 252 yds, 2 TD

Top rushers

- SEA – Shaun Alexander: 14 car, 73 yds
- JAX – Fred Taylor: 20 car, 76 yds

Top receivers

- SEA – Bobby Engram: 8 rec, 79 yds
- JAX – Jimmy Smith: 7 rec, 130 yds, 2 TD

Team – pass – rush – total – to

- SEA – 225 – 97 – 322 – 5
- JAX – 243 – 119 – 362 – 0

Jacksonville's defense forced the Seahawks into five turnovers, including two interceptions of Hasselbeck, en route to a 26–14 victory. The Jaguars held Shaun Alexander to 73 yards on 14 attempts and no touchdowns as the Seahawks started the season 0–1.

==== Week 2: vs. Atlanta Falcons ====
Week Two: Seattle Seahawks vs. Atlanta Falcons – Game summary

Quarter	1	2	3	4	Total
Falcons	0	0	10	8	18
Seahawks	0	21	0	0	21

at Qwest Field, Seattle

- Date: September 18
- Game time: 1:06pm local
- Game weather: clear, 60 °F (16 °C), 71% humidity, wind W 4 miles per hour (6.4 km/h)
- Game attendance: 66,030
- Referee: Mike Carey
- TV announcers (Fox): Kenny Albert, Brian Baldinger, Chris Myers
- Gamecenter, Gamebook

Game information

First quarter

- No scoring plays

Second quarter

- SEA – Joe Jurevicius 6-yard pass from Matt Hasselbeck (Josh Brown kick), 8:24 (SEA 7–0)
- SEA – Shaun Alexander 14-yard run (Josh Brown kick), 3:56 (SEA 14–0)
- SEA – Jerramy Stevens 35-yard pass from Matt Hasselbeck (Josh Brown kick), 0:28 (SEA 21–0)

Third quarter

- ATL – Brian Finneran 5-yard pass from Michael Vick (Todd Peterson kick), 10:14 (SEA 21–7)
- ATL – Todd Peterson 30-yard field goal, 7:00 (SEA 21–10)

Fourth quarter

- ATL– T. J. Duckett 1-yard run (2-pt PAT: Alge Crumpler pass from Matt Schaub), 3:58 (SEA 21–18)

Top passers

- ATL – Michael Vick: 11/19, 123 yds, 1 TD
- SEA – Matt Hasselbeck: 20/31, 281 yds, 2 TD

Top rushers

- ATL – Warrick Dunn: 16 car, 54 yds
- SEA – Shaun Alexander: 28 car, 144 yds, 1 TD

Top receivers

- ATL – Alge Crumpler: 3 rec, 53 yds
- SEA – Darrell Jackson: 8 rec, 131 yds

Team – pass – rush – total – to

- ATL – 108 – 115 – 223 – 0
- SEA – 265 – 163 – 428 – 1

For their home opener, the Seahawks faced the same team they beat in the last game of the 2004 regular season, the Atlanta Falcons. Seattle outgained Atlanta 428–223, and the game remained close until the final drive. On Atlanta's last drive Bryce Fisher sacked Michael Vick on third down, and on the next play, Andre Dyson knocked down Matt Schaub's 4th down pass. Shaun Alexander rushed for 144 yards and a touchdown. All of Seattle's points were scored in the second quarter.

==== Week 3: vs. Arizona Cardinals ====
Week Three: Seattle Seahawks vs. Arizona Cardinals – Game summary

Quarter	1	2	3	4	Total
Cardinals	3	6	3	0	12
Seahawks	7	3	14	13	37

at Qwest Field, Seattle

- Date: September 25
- Game time: 1:06pm local
- Game weather: clear, 60 °F (16 °C), 60% humidity, wind 6 miles per hour (9.7 km/h)
- Game attendance: 64,843
- Referee: Tony Corrente
- TV announcers (Fox): Curt Menefee, JC Pearson, Jody Jackson
- Gamecenter, Gamebook

Game information

First quarter

- ARI – Neil Rackers 54-yard field goal, 9:46 (ARI 3–0)
- SEA – Shaun Alexander 25-yard run (Josh Brown kick), 4:20 (SEA 7–3)

Second quarter

- ARI – Neil Rackers 39-yard field goal, 14:07 (SEA 7–6)
- SEA –Josh Brown 33-yard field goal, 6:43 (SEA 10–6)
- ARI – Neil Rackers 50-yard field goal, 3:41 (SEA 10–9)

Third quarter

- SEA – Shaun Alexander 1-yard run (Josh Brown kick), 11:51 (SEA 17–9)
- SEA – Shaun Alexander 1-yard run (Josh Brown kick), 11:21 (SEA 24–9)
- ARI – Neil Rackers 39-yard field goal, 5:06 (SEA 24–12)

Fourth quarter

- SEA – Shaun Alexander 1-yard run (Josh Brown kick), 14:56 (SEA 31–12)
- SEA –Josh Brown 23-yard field goal, 8:50 (SEA 34–12)
- SEA –Josh Brown 47-yard field goal, 1:28 (SEA 37–12)

Top passers

- ARI – Kurt Warner: 8/13, 105 yds
- SEA – Matt Hasselbeck: 20/31, 242 yds

Top rushers

- ARI – Marcel Shipp: 10 car, 41 yds
- SEA – Shaun Alexander: 22 car, 140 yds, 4 TD

Top receivers

- ARI – Anquan Boldin: 6 rec, 88 yds
- SEA – Darrell Jackson: 8 rec, 125 yds

Team – pass – rush – total – to

- ARI – 176 – 90 – 266 – 2
- SEA – 284 – 163 – 447 – 0

In week three, Seattle defeated the division rival Arizona Cardinals 37–12. Shaun Alexander rushed for 140 yards and four touchdowns. The Seahawks' defense forced its first turnover of the season, including a fumble recovery following a sack of Josh McCown by Michael Boulware at the Arizona 1. The Seahawks capitalized, with Shaun Alexander scoring on the next play.

==== Week 4: at Washington Redskins ====
Week Four: Seattle Seahawks at Washington Redskins – Game summary

Quarter	1	2	3	4	OT	Total
Seahawks	3	0	7	7	0	17
Redskins	0	7	10	0	3	20

at FedExField, Landover, Maryland

- Date: October 2
- Game time: 1:03pm local
- Game weather: clear, 80 °F (27 °C), 51% humidity, wind S 7 miles per hour (11 km/h)
- Game attendance: 90,215
- Referee: Bernie Kukar
- TV announcers (Fox): Ron Pitts, Tim Ryan, Jay Glazer
- Gamecenter, Gamebook

Game information

First quarter

- SEA – Josh Brown 53-yard field goal, 5:58 (SEA 3–0)

Second quarter

- WAS – Robert Royal 1-yard pass from Mark Brunell (Nick Novak kick), 2:39 (WAS 7–3)

Third quarter

- WAS – Mike Sellers 4-yard pass from Mark Brunell (Nick Novak kick), 7:19 (WAS 14–3)
- SEA – Shaun Alexander 3-yard run (Josh Brown kick), 4:10 (SEA 14–10)
- WAS – Nick Novak 40-yard field goal, 0:03 (WAS 17–10)

Fourth quarter

- SEA – Darrell Jackson 6-yard pass from Matt Hasselbeck (Josh Brown kick), 1:23 (Tied 17–17)

Overtime

- WAS – Nick Novak 39-yard field goal, 9:29 (WAS 20–17)

Top passers

- SEA – Matt Hasselbeck: 26/38, 242 yds, 1 TD
- WAS – Mark Brunell: 20/36, 226 yds, 2 TD, 1 INT

Top rushers

- SEA – Shaun Alexander: 20 car, 98 yds, 1 TD
- WAS – Clinton Portis: 25 car, 90 yds

Top receivers

- SEA – Bobby Engram: 9 rec, 106 yds
- WAS – Santana Moss: 6 rec, 87 yds

Team – pass – rush – total – to

- SEA – 235 – 119 – 354 – 0
- WAS – 211 – 141 – 352 – 1

The following week, the Seahawks were on the road against the Washington Redskins. Kicker Josh Brown missed a field goal late in regulation. The game went into overtime and the Seahawks lost 20–17 after a 39-yard field goal by Redskins kicker Nick Novak.

==== Week 5: at St. Louis Rams ====
Week Five: Seattle Seahawks at St. Louis Rams – Game summary

Quarter	1	2	3	4	Total
Seahawks	14	10	10	3	37
Rams	7	14	7	3	31

at Edward Jones Dome, St. Louis, Missouri

- Date: October 9
- Game time: 12:02pm local
- Game weather: indoors
- Game attendance: 65,707
- Referee: Ron Winter
- TV announcers (Fox): Curt Menefee, JC Pearson, Dan McLaughlin
- Gamecenter, Gamebook

Game information

First quarter

- STL – Chris Johnson 99-yard kick return (Jeff Wilkins kick), 14:46 (STL 7–0)
- SEA – Shaun Alexander 1-yard run (Josh Brown kick), 9:34 (SEA 7–7)
- SEA – Jerramy Stevens 29-yard pass from Matt Hasselbeck (Josh Brown kick), 1:37 (SEA 14–7)

Second quarter

- STL – Kevin Curtis 25-yard pass from Marc Bulger]] (Jeff Wilkins]] kick), 13:49 (Tied 14–14)
- SEA – Joe Jurevicius 24-yard pass from Matt Hasselbeck (Josh Brown kick), 9:05 (SEA 21–14)
- STL – Torry Holt 26-yard pass from Marc Bulger (Jeff Wilkins]] kick), 2:02 (Tied 21–21)
- SEA – Josh Brown 34-yard field goal, 0:00 (SEA 24–21)

Third quarter

- SEA – Josh Brown 44-yard field goal, 9:23 (SEA 27–21)
- SEA – Shaun Alexander 18-yard run (Josh Brown kick), 6:15 (SEA 34–21)
- STL – Steven Jackson 4-yard run (Jeff Wilkins kick), 0:26 (SEA 34–28)

Fourth quarter

- SEA – Josh Brown 28-yard field goal, 7:32 (SEA 37–28)
- STL – Jeff Wilkins 40-yard field goal, 3:54 (SEA 37–31)

Top passers

- SEA – Matt Hasselbeck: 27/38, 316 yds, 2 TD
- STL – Marc Bulger: 26/40, 336 yds, 2 TD, 1 INT

Top rushers

- SEA – Shaun Alexander: 25 car, 119 yds, 2 TD
- STL – Steven Jackson: 17 car, 77 yds, 1 TD

Top receivers

- SEA – Joe Jurevicius: 9 rec, 137 yds, 1 TD
- STL – Torry Holt: 8 rec, 126 yds, 1 TD

Team – pass – rush – total – to

- SEA – 299 – 134 – 433 – 0
- STL – 309 – 77 – 386 – 2

The Seahawks went to the Edward Jones Dome to face their division rival, the St. Louis Rams. It was their first meeting since the 2004 playoff game. The Rams returned the opening kickoff 99 yards for a touchdown. Led by Joe Jurevicius's 9 receptions for 137 yards and 1 touchdown, Matt Hasselbeck's 27 completions for 316 yards, 2 touchdowns and no interceptions, and Shaun Alexander's 119 yards and 2 touchdowns, Seattle racked up 433 yards of total offense. The defense recorded 2 takeaways in the second half, an interception by Lofa Tatupu and a fumble recovery on a punt by J. P. Darche with 2:51 left in the game. The Seahawks ended a 4-game losing streak to the Rams, and received their first win in St. Louis since 1997.

==== Week 6: vs. Houston Texans ====
Week Six: Seattle Seahawks vs. Houston Texans – Game summary

Quarter	1	2	3	4	Total
Texans	0	3	7	0	10
Seahawks	14	7	7	14	42

at Qwest Field, Seattle

- Date: October 16
- Game time: 5:38pm local
- Game weather: overcast, 57 °F (14 °C), 76% humidity, wind S 14 miles per hour (23 km/h)
- Game attendance: 66,196
- Referee: Scott Green
- TV announcers (ESPN): Mike Patrick, Joe Theismann, Paul Maguire, Suzy Kolber
- Gamecenter, Gamebook

Game information

First quarter

- SEA – Shaun Alexander 4-yard run (Josh Brown kick), 8:12 (SEA 7–0)
- SEA – Shaun Alexander 5-yard run (Josh Brown kick), 1:08 (SEA 14–0)

Second quarter

- HOU – Kris Brown 39-yard field goal, 7:50 (SEA 14–3)
- SEA – Joe Jurevicius 3-yard pass from Matt Hasselbeck (Josh Brown kick), 1:45 (SEA 21–3)

Third quarter

- SEA – Shaun Alexander 1-yard run (Josh Brown kick), 8:23 (SEA 28–3)
- HOU – Domanick Williams 27-yard pass from David Carr (Kris Brown kick), 3:35 (SEA 28–10)

Fourth quarter

- SEA – Shaun Alexander 23-yard run (Josh Brown kick), 13:17 (SEA 35–10)
- SEA – Maurice Morris 11-yard run (Josh Brown kick), 5:14 (SEA 42–10)

Top passers

- HOU – David Carr: 19/33, 179 yds, 1 TD
- SEA – Matt Hasselbeck: 14/20, 168 yds, 1 TD, 1 INT

Top rushers

- HOU – Domanick Williams: 18 car, 40 yds
- SEA – Shaun Alexander: 22 car, 141 yds, 4 TD

Top receivers

- HOU – Jabar Gaffney: 10 rec, 87 yds
- SEA – Peter Warrick: 3 rec, 53 yds

Team – pass – rush – total – to

- HOU – 160 – 67 – 227 – 0
- SEA – 139 – 320 – 459 – 1

The Seahawks returned home for a Sunday night game against the Houston Texans. The Seahawks easily won, led by Shaun Alexander's 144 yards and four touchdowns, winning by a score of 42–10. Seattle set a team record with 320 yards rushing. This was the first ever meeting of these two teams and first meeting with a Houston NFL team since the 1996 season.

==== Week 7: vs. Dallas Cowboys ====
Week Seven: Seattle Seahawks vs. Dallas Cowboys – Game summary

Quarter	1	2	3	4	Total
Cowboys	7	0	0	3	10
Seahawks	0	3	0	10	13

at Qwest Field, Seattle

- Date: October 23
- Game time: 1:06pm local
- Game weather: rain, 55 °F (13 °C), 92% humidity, wind NNW 1 mile per hour (1.6 km/h)
- Game attendance: 67,046
- Referee: Terry McAulay
- TV announcers (Fox): Dick Stockton, Troy Aikman, Patrick O’Neal
- Gamecenter, Gamebook

Game information

First quarter

- DAL – Keyshawn Johnson 5-yard pass from Drew Bledsoe (Jose Cortez kick), 1:03 (DAL 7–0)

Second quarter

- SEA – Josh Brown 55-yard field goal, 0:33 (DAL 7–3)

Third quarter

- No scoring plays

Fourth quarter

- DAL –Jose Cortez 21-yard field goal, 2:06 (DAL 10–3)
- SEA – Ryan Hannam 1-yard pass from Matt Hasselbeck (Josh Brown kick), 0:40 (Tied 10–10)
- SEA – Josh Brown 50-yard field goal, 0:00 (SEA 13–10)

Top passers

- DAL – Drew Bledsoe: 13/24, 136 yds, 1 TD, 2 INT
- SEA – Matt Hasselbeck: 23/42, 224 yds, 1 TD, 2 INT

Top rushers

- DAL – Marion Barber: 22 car, 95 yds
- SEA – Shaun Alexander: 21 car, 61 yds

Top receivers

- DAL – Jason Witten: 2 rec, 47 yds, 1 TD
- SEA – Jerramy Stevens: 5 rec, 60 yds

Team – pass – rush – total – to

- DAL – 111 – 164 – 275 – 2
- SEA – 217 – 72 – 289 – 3

The Seahawk defense had an exceptional game, recording five sacks and two interceptions against the Dallas Cowboys. The key play occurred when cornerback Jordan Babineaux intercepted opposing quarterback Drew Bledsoe's pass, the second interception of the day, and returned it 25 yards, setting the stage for kicker Josh Brown's game-winning 50-yard field goal as time expired. The Seahawks won 13–10.

==== Week 9: at Arizona Cardinals ====
Week Nine: Seattle Seahawks at Arizona Cardinals – Game summary

Quarter	1	2	3	4	Total
Seahawks	3	14	10	6	33
Cardinals	3	3	10	3	19

at Sun Devil Stadium, Tempe, Arizona

- Date: November 6
- Game time: 2:05pm local
- Game weather: partly cloudy, 79 °F (26 °C), 16% humidity, wind 6 miles per hour (9.7 km/h)
- Game attendance: 43,542
- Referee: Walt Anderson
- TV announcers (Fox): Ron Pitts, Tim Ryan, Kevin McCabe
- Gamecenter, Gamebook

Game information

First quarter

- ARI – Neil Rackers 23-yard field goal, 7:56 (ARI 3–0)
- SEA – Josh Brown 26-yard field goal, 1:00 (Tied 3–3)

Second quarter

- SEA – Joe Jurevicius 4-yard pass from Matt Hasselbeck (Josh Brown kick), 13:00 (SEA 10–3)
- ARI – Neil Rackers 31-yard field goal, 6:16 (SEA 10–6)
- SEA – Matt Hasselbeck 1-yard run (Josh Brown kick), 0:39 (SEA 17–6)

Third quarter

- SEA – Shaun Alexander 88-yard run (Josh Brown kick), 14:40 (SEA 24–6)
- ARI – Neil Rackers 50-yard field goal, 10:29 (SEA 24–9)
- SEA – Josh Brown 28-yard field goal, 6:48 (SEA 27–9)
- ARI – Bryant Johnson 6-yard pass from Kurt Warner (Neil Rackers kick), 0:35 (SEA 27–16)

Fourth quarter

- ARI – Neil Rackers 44-yard field goal, 12:09 (SEA 27–19)
- SEA – Shaun Alexander 14-yard run (PAT failed), 5:19 (SEA 33–19)

Top passers

- SEA – Matt Hasselbeck: 13/20, 162 yds, 1 TD
- ARI – Kurt Warner: 29/48, 334 yds, 1 TD, 3 INT

Top rushers

- SEA – Shaun Alexander: 23 car, 173 yds, 2 TD
- ARI – J. J. Arrington: 5 car, 40 yds

Top receivers

- SEA – Jerheme Urban: 1 rec, 46 yds
- ARI – Larry Fitzgerald: 8 rec, 102 yds

Team – pass – rush – total – to

- SEA – 162 – 208 – 370 – 0
- ARI – 307 – 71 – 378 – 4

After their Week 8 bye, the Seahawks traveled to Sun Devil Stadium and completed a season sweep of the Cardinals by a score of 33–19. The defense recorded four sacks and three interceptions of quarterback Kurt Warner. Shaun Alexander tied his own team record with an 88-yard touchdown run on the first play of the third quarter and finished the day with 173 yards and two touchdowns.

==== Week 10: vs. St. Louis Rams ====
Week Ten: Seattle Seahawks vs. St. Louis Rams – Game summary

Quarter	1	2	3	4	Total
Rams	3	0	6	7	16
Seahawks	0	10	14	7	31

at Qwest Field, Seattle

- Date: November 13
- Game time: 1:16pm local
- Game weather: overcast, 47 °F (8 °C), 99% humidity, wind NW 8 miles per hour (13 km/h)
- Game attendance: 67,192
- Referee: Jeff Triplette
- TV announcers (Fox): Curt Menefee, JC Pearson, Chris Myers
- Gamecenter, Gamebook

Game information

First quarter

- STL – Jeff Wilkins 31-yard field goal, 9:50 (STL 3–0)

Second quarter

- SEA – Shaun Alexander 6-yard run (Josh Brown kick), 8:45 (SEA 7–3)
- SEA – Josh Brown 31-yard field goal, 0:15 (SEA 10–3)

Third quarter

- STL – Jeff Wilkins 36-yard field goal, 12:22 (SEA 10–6)
- SEA – Shaun Alexander 4-yard run (Josh Brown kick), 9:20 (SEA 17–6)
- SEA – D. J. Hackett 31-yard pass from Matt Hasselbeck (Josh Brown kick), 4:59 (SEA 24–6)
- STL – Jeff Wilkins 39-yard field goal, 0:40 (SEA 24–9)

Fourth quarter

- STL – Torry Holt 14-yard pass from Marc Bulger (Jeff Wilkins kick), 7:00 (SEA 24–16)
- SEA – Shaun Alexander 17-yard run (Josh Brown kick), 1:12 (SEA 31–16)

Top passers

- STL – Marc Bulger: 28/40, 304 yds, 1 TD, 1 INT
- SEA – Matt Hasselbeck: 17/29, 243 yds, 1 TD, 2 INT

Top rushers

- STL – Steven Jackson: 17 car, 70 yds
- SEA – Shaun Alexander: 33 car, 165 yds, 3 TD

Top receivers

- STL – Marshall Faulk: 5 rec, 54 yds
- SEA – D. J. Hackett: 2 rec, 78 yds, 1 TD

Team – pass – rush – total – to

- STL – 278 – 75 – 353 – 2
- SEA – 243 – 174 – 417 – 2

The Seahawks returned home and finished off a season sweep of the Rams for the first time since the 2002 realignment, with a 31–16 victory. The Rams had a 3–0 lead early, when on fourth down they went for a fake field goal, but was unsuccessful. The Seahawks proceeded to put together an 87-yard drive that ended in a touchdown for a 7–3 lead. From that point the Seahawks went on to outgain the Rams 281–46, building a 24–6 lead. The Rams narrowed it to 24–16, but led by Shaun Alexander's 165 yards and three touchdowns, the game was put away with his 17-yard touchdown burst with 1:12 left. Matt Hasselbeck contributed with 17 completions, 243 yards, one touchdown and two interceptions. Seattle made 10 out of 15 third down conversions.

==== Week 11: at San Francisco 49ers ====
Week Eleven: Seattle Seahawks at San Francisco 49ers – Game summary

Quarter	1	2	3	4	Total
Seahawks	3	14	10	0	27
49ers	3	6	3	13	25

at Monster Park, San Francisco

- Date: November 20
- Game time: 1:05pm local
- Game weather: clear, 63 °F (17 °C), 54% humidity, wind calm
- Game attendance: 63,590
- Referee: Mike Carey
- TV announcers (Fox): Curt Menefee, JC Pearson, Chris Myers
- Gamecenter, Gamebook

Game information

First quarter

- SEA – Josh Brown 21-yard field goal, 10:03 (SEA 3–0)
- SF – Joe Nedney 33-yard field goal, 4:03 (Tied 3–3)

Second quarter

- SEA – Shaun Alexander 8-yard run (Josh Brown kick), 13:09 (SEA 10–3)
- SF – Joe Nedney 31-yard field goal, 10:07 (SEA 10–6)
- SEA – D. J. Hackett 12-yard pass from Matt Hasselbeck (Josh Brown kick), 6:28 (SEA 17–6)
- SF – Joe Nedney 40-yard field goal, 2:00 (SEA 17–9)

Third quarter

- SF – Joe Nedney 22-yard field goal, 6:24 (SEA 17–12)
- SEA – Shaun Alexander 1-yard run (Josh Brown kick), 3:51 (SEA 24–12)
- SEA – Josh Brown 47-yard field goal, 2:23 (SEA 27–12)

Fourth quarter

- SF – Brandon Lloyd 22-yard pass from Ken Dorsey (Joe Nedney kick), 14:18 (SEA 27–19)
- SF – Kevan Barlow 1-yard run (PAT failed), 0:28 (SEA 27–25)

Top passers

- SEA – Matt Hasselbeck: 19/31, 233 yds, 1 TD
- SF – Ken Dorsey: 18/29, 249 yds, 1 TD

Top rushers

- SEA – Shaun Alexander: 24 car, 115 yds, 2 TD
- SF – Kevan Barlow: 11 car, 83 yds, 1 TD

Top receivers

- SEA – Bobby Engram: 6 rec, 93 yds
- SF – Brandon Lloyd: 7 rec, 119 yds, 1 TD

Team – pass – rush – total – to

- SEA – 228 – 145 – 373 – 0
- SF – 226 – 110 – 336 – 1

The Seahawks went to Monster Park to take on the division rival San Francisco 49ers. The Seahawks led 27–12 going into the fourth quarter, but the comfortable lead would not last. In the final seconds, the 49ers got within two points with a 1-yard touchdown run by Maurice Hicks. The 49ers failed the two point conversion attempt, and Seattle held on for the win by a score of 27–25.

==== Week 12: vs. New York Giants ====
Week Twelve: Seattle Seahawks vs. New York Giants – Game summary

Quarter	1	2	3	4	OT	Total
Giants	0	10	3	8	0	21
Seahawks	7	0	7	7	3	24

at Qwest Field, Seattle

- Date: November 27
- Game time: 1:16pm local
- Game weather: clear, 42 °F (6 °C), 84% humidity, wind S 5 miles per hour (8.0 km/h)
- Game attendance: 67,102
- Referee: Larry Nemmers
- TV announcers (Fox): Dick Stockton, Daryl Johnston, Tony Siragusa
- Gamecenter, Gamebook

Game information

First quarter

- SEA – Joe Jurevicius 35-yard pass from Matt Hasselbeck (Josh Brown kick), 0:43 (SEA 7–0)

Second quarter

- NYG – Jay Feely 39-yard field goal, 4:23 (SEA 7–3)
- NYG – Jeremy Shockey 7-yard pass from Eli Manning (Jay Feely kick), 1:07 (NYG 10–7)

Third quarter

- NYG – Jay Feely 43-yard field goal, 10:20 (NYG 13–7)
- SEA – Joe Jurevicius 16-yard pass from Matt Hasselbeck (Josh Brown kick), 4:36 (SEA 14–13)

Fourth quarter

- SEA – Shaun Alexander 4-yard run (Josh Brown kick), 4:33 (SEA 21–13)
- NYG – Amani Toomer 18-yard pass from Eli Manning (2-pt PAT: Jeremy Shockey pass from Eli Manning), 1:59 (Tied 21–21)

Overtime

- SEA – Josh Brown 36-yard field goal, 2:45 (SEA 24–21)

Top passers

- NYG – Eli Manning: 29/53, 344 yds, 2 TD, 1 INT
- SEA – Matt Hasselbeck: 21/37, 249 yds, 2 TD, 1 INT

Top rushers

- NYG – Tiki Barber: 26 car, 151 yds
- SEA – Shaun Alexander: 31 car, 110 yds, 1 TD

Top receivers

- NYG – Jeremy Shockey: 10 rec, 127 yds, 1 TD
- SEA – Joe Jurevicius: 8 rec, 137 yds, 2 TD

Team – pass – rush – total – to

- NYG – 324 – 166 – 490 – 1
- SEA – 228 – 127 – 355 – 2

The Seahawks returned home and played eventual NFC East champion New York Giants. With the score tied 21–21, opposing kicker Jay Feely missed three chances for a winning field goal (one as time expired in regulation and two in overtime). The Seahawks won on a 36-yard Josh Brown field goal and the Seahawks won by a final score of 24–21. Seahawks gunslinger Matt Hasselbeck threw for 249 yards and two TDs in Seattle's 24–21 overtime victory over the New York Giants. This game is also remembered for the raucous noise inside Qwest Field which caused 11 false start penalties against the Giants.

==== Week 13: at Philadelphia Eagles ====
Week Thirteen: Seattle Seahawks at Philadelphia Eagles – Game summary

Quarter	1	2	3	4	Total
Seahawks	14	21	7	0	42
Eagles	0	0	0	0	0

at Lincoln Financial Field, Philadelphia

- Date: December 5
- Game time: 9:07pm local
- Game weather: snow, 31 °F (−1 °C), 80% humidity, wind NNE 6 miles per hour (9.7 km/h)
- Game attendance: 67,637
- Referee: Scott Green
- TV announcers (ABC): Al Michaels, John Madden, Sam Ryan
- Gamecenter, Gamebook

Game information

First quarter

- SEA – Bobby Engram 11-yard pass from Matt Hasselbeck (Josh Brown kick), 6:50 (SEA 7–0)
- SEA – Andre Dyson 72-yard interception return (Josh Brown kick), 3:24 (SEA 14–0)

Second quarter

- SEA – Lofa Tatupu 38-yard interception return (Josh Brown kick), 11:31 (SEA 21–0)
- SEA – Shaun Alexander 2-yard run (Josh Brown kick), 4:34 (SEA 28–0)
- SEA – Shaun Alexander 1-yard run (Josh Brown kick), 0:29 (SEA 35–0)

Third quarter

- SEA – Andre Dyson 25-yard fumble return (Josh Brown kick), 14:45 (SEA 42–0)

Fourth quarter

- No scoring plays

Top passers

- SEA – Matt Hasselbeck: 8/15, 98 yds, 1 TD
- PHI – Koy Detmer: 13/29, 84 yds, 2 INT

Top rushers

- SEA – Shaun Alexander: 19 car, 49 yds, 2 TD
- PHI – Ryan Moats: 10 car, 26 yds

Top receivers

- SEA – D. J. Hackett: 1 rec, 42 yds
- PHI – L. J. Smith: 2 rec, 46 yds

Team – pass – rush – total – to

- SEA – 98 – 96 – 194 – 0
- PHI – 129 – 61 – 190 – 6

On December 5, 2005, in a game dubbed "The Monday Night Massacre" by NFL Films, the Seahawks shut out the Philadelphia Eagles 42–0 with three defensive touchdowns (two interceptions, one fumble return) to tie the then-largest margin of victory mark in Monday Night Football history. They also set the mark for the greatest margin of victory in a Monday Night shutout, as well as set the NFL record for scoring the most points with under 200 yards of offense. A fourth interception return by Michael Boulware fell just short of tying another Seahawks NFL record of four defensive scores in a single game, set during a 45–0 victory over the Kansas City Chiefs in 1984. This win also marked the first time since 2003 the Seahawks were able to hold an opponent scoreless. The defeat was the Eagles third worst in team history.

==== Week 14: vs. San Francisco 49ers ====
Week Fourteen: Seattle Seahawks vs. San Francisco 49ers – Game summary

Quarter	1	2	3	4	Total
49ers	3	0	0	0	3
Seahawks	7	17	14	3	41

at Qwest Field, Seattle

- Date: December 11
- Game time: 1:06 pm local
- Game weather: overcast and fog, 36 °F (2 °C), 97% humidity, wind SE 1 mile per hour (1.6 km/h)
- Game attendance: 66,690
- Referee: Ed Hochuli
- TV announcers (Fox): Ron Pitts, Tim Ryan, Chris Myers
- Gamecenter, Gamebook

Game information

First quarter

- SEA – Bobby Engram 28-yard pass from Matt Hasselbeck (Josh Brown kick), 10:40 (SEA 7–0)
- SF – Joe Nedney 39-yard field goal, 4:35 (SEA 7–3)

Second quarter

- SEA – Jerramy Stevens 8-yard pass from Matt Hasselbeck (Josh Brown kick), 14:56 (SEA 14–3)
- SEA – Joe Jurevicius 21-yard pass from Matt Hasselbeck (Josh Brown kick), 14:38 (SEA 21–3)
- SEA – Josh Brown 52-yard field goal, 7:28 (SEA 24–3)

Third quarter

- SEA – Bobby Engram 7-yard pass from Matt Hasselbeck (Josh Brown kick), 7:13 (SEA 31–3)
- SEA – Shaun Alexander 3-yard run (Josh Brown kick), 1:29 (SEA 38–3)

Fourth quarter

- SEA – Josh Brown 52-yard field goal, 5:15 (SEA 41–3)

Top passers

- SF – Alex Smith: 9/22, 77 yds, 1 INT
- SEA – Matt Hasselbeck: 21/25, 226 yds, 4 TD, 1 INT

Top rushers

- SF – Kevan Barlow: 11 car, 33 yds
- SEA – Shaun Alexander: 21 car, 108 yds, 1 TD

Top receivers

- SF – Brandon Lloyd: 3 rec, 37 yds
- SEA – Bobby Engram: 6 rec, 65 yds, 2 TD

Team – pass – rush – total – to

- SF – 51 – 62 – 113 – 2
- SEA – 253 – 185 – 438 – 1

A week after their rout of the Eagles in Philadelphia, the Seahawks came home and routed the 49ers 41–3 to complete their first ever division sweep of either the NFC or AFC West. Against the Eagles and 49ers, Seattle won by a combined score of 83–3. They outgained the 49ers 438–113 in total yards. Matt Hasselbeck had his best game of the season, with 21 completions for 226 yards and four touchdown passes.

==== Week 15: at Tennessee Titans ====
Week Fifteen: Seattle Seahawks at Tennessee Titans – Game summary

Quarter	1	2	3	4	Total
Seahawks	14	0	7	7	28
Titans	0	14	10	0	24

at The Coliseum, Nashville, Tennessee

- Date: December 18
- Game time: 12:03pm local
- Game weather: clear, 45 °F (7 °C), 44% humidity, wind NE 4 miles per hour (6.4 km/h)
- Game attendance: 69,149
- Referee: Gerry Austin
- TV announcers (Fox): Ron Pitts, Tim Ryan, Maria Black
- Gamecenter, Gamebook

Game information

First quarter

- SEA – Jerramy Stevens 22-yard pass from Matt Hasselbeck (Josh Brown kick), 11:35 (SEA 7–0)
- SEA – Shaun Alexander 1-yard run (Josh Brown kick), 5:54 (SEA 14–0)

Second quarter

- TEN – Jarrett Payton 3-yard run (Rob Bironas kick), 6:05 (SEA 14–7)
- TEN – Drew Bennett 4-yard pass from Steve McNair (Rob Bironas kick), 0:04 (Tied 14–14)

Third quarter

- TEN – Drew Bennett 14-yard pass from Steve McNair (Rob Bironas kick), 10:55 (TEN 21–14)
- TEN – Rob Bironas 38-yard field goal, 6:14 (TEN 24–14)
- SEA – Joe Jurevicius 4-yard pass from Matt Hasselbeck (Josh Brown kick), 4:51 (TEN 24–21)

Fourth quarter

- SEA – Darrell Jackson 2-yard pass from Matt Hasselbeck (Josh Brown kick), 8:59 (SEA 28–24)

Top passers

- SEA – Matt Hasselbeck: 21/27, 285 yds, 3 TD
- TEN – Steve McNair: 23/38, 310 yds, 2 TD

Top rushers

- SEA – Shaun Alexander: 26 car, 172 yds, 1 TD
- TEN – Chris Brown: 20 car, 56 yds

Top receivers

- SEA – Bobby Engram: 6 rec, 95 yds
- TEN – Ben Troupe: 6 rec, 116 yds

Team – pass – rush – total – to

- SEA – 276 – 183 – 459 – 0
- TEN – 336 – 81 – 417 – 0

After their rout of the 49ers, the Seahawks traveled to The Coliseum to face the Tennessee Titans. Coming into the second half, the score was tied at 14. After the third quarter, the Seahawks trailed 24–21. Matt Hasselbeck completed the fourth quarter comeback, throwing a game-winning 2-yard pass to wide receiver Bobby Engram. The Seahawks won 28–24. Seahawks quarterback Matt Hasselbeck went 21-of-27 for 287 yards with 2 TDs and a passer rating of 147.7. Running back Shaun Alexander rushed for 172 yards on 26 carries. Titans signal-caller Steve McNair threw for 310 yards and 2 TDs in a losing effort.

==== Week 16: vs. Indianapolis Colts ====
Week Sixteen: Seattle Seahawks vs. Indianapolis Colts – Game summary

Quarter	1	2	3	4	Total
Colts	3	3	0	7	13
Seahawks	7	7	7	7	28

at Qwest Field, Seattle

- Date: December 24
- Game time: 1:17pm local
- Game weather: overcast, 57 °F (14 °C), 88% humidity, wind SE 10 miles per hour (16 km/h)
- Game attendance: 67,855
- Referee: Bill Vinovich
- TV announcers (CBS): Jim Nantz, Phil Simms, Bonnie Bernstein
- Gamecenter, Gamebook

Game information

First quarter

- IND – Mike Vanderjagt 24-yard field goal, 7:51 (IND 3–0)
- SEA – Shaun Alexander 2-yard run (Josh Brown kick), 5:42 (SEA 7–3)

Second quarter

- SEA – Jerramy Stevens 15-yard pass from Matt Hasselbeck (Josh Brown kick), 11:46 (SEA 14–3)
- IND – Mike Vanderjagt 32-yard field goal, 0:37 (SEA 14–6)

Third quarter

- SEA – Shaun Alexander 6-yard pass from Matt Hasselbeck (Josh Brown kick), 10:57 (SEA 21–6)

Fourth quarter

- SEA – Shaun Alexander 1-yard run (Josh Brown kick), 3:58 (SEA 28–6)
- IND – Troy Walters 6-yard pass from Jim Sorgi (Mike Vanderjagt kick), 1:59 (SEA 28–13)

Top passers

- IND – Jim Sorgi: 22/31, 237 yds, 1 TD
- SEA – Matt Hasselbeck: 17/21, 168 yds, 2 TD

Top rushers

- IND – Edgerrin James: 13 car, 41 yds
- SEA – Shaun Alexander: 21 car, 139 yds, 2 TD

Top receivers

- IND – Brandon Stokley: 5 rec, 122 yds
- SEA – Jerramy Stevens: 5 rec, 39 yds, 1 TD

Team – pass – rush – total – to

- IND – 344 – 43 – 387 – 1
- SEA – 159 – 173 – 332 – 0

On Christmas Eve, the Seahawks beat the Colts 28–13, setting the franchise record for the most wins in one season with 13. Shaun Alexander scored three touchdowns in the game and tied Priest Holmes for the NFL record for touchdowns in a season with 27. The victory also clinched the top seed in the NFC playoffs for the Seahawks, assuring them of a home playoff game during the weekend of January 14–15, 2006 against the lowest remaining NFC seed (which turned out to be the Washington Redskins). The Colts-Seahawks matchup featured interesting storylines even before the kickoff. The game featured the highest scoring and winningest teams against each other, and each looking to set a franchise record for most wins in a season. In addition, the schedule makers set a record with the first regular season game where the teams combined for at least 25 victories. Coming into the game, the Colts had already clinched the #1 seed in the AFC playoffs, and the Seahawks were looking to clinch the #1 in the NFC playoffs with a win. After the Colts took the lead with a field goal, a kick return by Josh Scobey set up the Seahawks' first score, a 2-yard run by Alexander. The Colts second offensive drive ended in a 31-yard blocked field goal attempt by Mike Vanderjagt which pushed assistant coach Jim Caldwell's decision to rest Peyton Manning and many other Colts starters for the remaining three quarters of the game. Matt Hasselbeck threw a touchdown to tight end Jerramy Stevens for a 14–3 Seahawks lead. After a field goal cut the lead to 14–6, Seattle put the game out of reach. First, Hasselbeck connected with Alexander for a 21–6 lead. Then, Alexander scored again to put the game away, 28–6. The Colts scored on a 6-yard pass from Jim Sorgi to Troy Walters to cut the lead to 28–13, but Scobey recovered the ensuing onside kick and Seattle ran out the clock to hold on for a 28–13 win.

==== Week 17: at Green Bay Packers ====
Week Seventeen: Seattle Seahawks at Green Bay Packers – Game summary

Quarter	1	2	3	4	Total
Seahawks	0	7	7	3	17
Packers	6	7	7	3	23

at Lambeau Field, Green Bay, Wisconsin

- Date: January 1
- Game time: 12:02pm local
- Game weather: cloudy, 34 °F (1 °C), 78% humidity, wind E 7 miles per hour (11 km/h)
- Game attendance: 69,928
- Referee: Bernie Kukar
- TV announcers (Fox): Curt Menefee, JC Pearson, Drew Smith
- Gamecenter, Gamebook

Game information

First quarter

- GB – Ryan Longwell 26-yard field goal, 8:44 (GB 3–0)
- GB – Ryan Longwell 32-yard field goal, 3:05 (GB 6–0)

Second quarter

- SEA – Shaun Alexander 1-yard run (Josh Brown kick), 13:00 (SEA 7–6)
- GB – Noah Herron 11-yard run (Ryan Longwell kick), 8:22 (GB 13–7)

Third quarter

- SEA – Joe Jurevicius 5-yard pass from Matt Hasselbeck (Josh Brown kick), 10:32 (SEA 14–13)
- GB – Antonio Chatman 9-yard pass from Brett Favre (Ryan Longwell kick), 3:41 (GB 20–14)

Fourth quarter

- GB – Ryan Longwell 28-yard field goal, 10:56 (GB 23–14)
- SEA – Josh Brown 44-yard field goal, 1:38 (GB 23–17)

Top passers

- SEA – Seneca Wallace: 9/17, 98 yds, 1 TD, 1 INT
- GB – Brett Favre: 21/37, 259 yds, 1 TD, 1 INT

Top rushers

- SEA – Shaun Alexander: 20 car, 73 yds, 1 TD
- GB – Noah Herron: 23 car, 61 yds, 1 TD

Top receivers

- SEA – Peter Warrick: 2 rec, 44 yds
- GB – Donald Driver: 6 rec, 118 yds

Team – pass – rush – total – to

- SEA – 147 – 98 – 245 – 2
- GB – 246 – 68 – 314 – 3

On January 1, 2006, despite losing to the Green Bay Packers 23–17, Shaun Alexander broke Priest Holmes's record for most touchdowns in a single season, with his 28th touchdown coming in the 2nd quarter of the game. He ended the season with the league's most rushing yards for the season with 1,880 yards, and led the league in points scored (168 points). Four days later, he was named the 2005 NFL MVP. For the season, the Seahawks as a team led the league with most points scored that season (452), as well as the most sacks with 50.

=== Postseason ===
Seattle entered the postseason as the #1 seed in the NFC. They were the only 2004-05 NFC playoff team to return for the 2005-06 playoffs.

==== NFC Divisional Playoff: vs. #6 Washington Redskins ====
NFC Divisional Playoff: #6 Washington Redskins at #1 Seattle Seahawks – Game summary

Quarter	1	2	3	4	Total
Redskins	0	3	0	7	10
Seahawks	0	7	7	6	20

at Qwest Field, Seattle

- Date: January 14 2006
- Game time: 1:35pm local
- Game weather: rain, 44 °F (7 °C), 83% humidity, wind SSE 1 mile per hour (1.6 km/h)
- Game attendance: 67,551
- Referee: Ron Winter
- TV announcers (Fox): Dick Stockton, Daryl Johnston and Tony Siragusa
- Gamecenter, Gamebook

Game information

First quarter

- No scoring plays

Second quarter

- WAS – John Hall 26-yard field goal, 8:59 (WAS 3–0)
- SEA – Darrell Jackson 29-yard pass from Matt Hasselbeck (Josh Brown kick), 3:22 (SEA 7–3)

Third quarter

- SEA – Matt Hasselbeck 6-yard run (Josh Brown kick), 9:35 (SEA 14–3)

Fourth quarter

- SEA – Josh Brown 33-yard field goal, 14:16 (SEA 17–3)
- WAS – Santana Moss 20-yard pass from Mark Brunell (John Hall kick), 11:59 (SEA 17–10)
- SEA – Josh Brown 31-yard field goal, 2:54 (SEA 20–10)

Top passers

- WAS – Mark Brunell: 22/37, 242 yds, 1 TD
- SEA – Matt Hasselbeck: 16/26, 215 yds, 1 TD

Top rushers

- WAS – Clinton Portis: 17 car, 41 yds
- SEA – Maurice Morris: 18 car, 49 yds

Top receivers

- WAS – Santana Moss: 7 rec, 103 yds, 1 TD
- SEA – Darrell Jackson: 9 rec, 143 yds, 1 TD

Team – pass – rush – total – to

- WAS – 230 – 59 – 289 – 1
- SEA – 215 – 119 – 334 – 3

After having a first round bye in the playoffs, the Seahawks hosted the Washington Redskins in the Divisional Playoffs. Shaun Alexander suffered a concussion in the first quarter, but the Seahawks managed to prevail by a final score of 20–10. The win ended the franchise's 21-year playoff victory drought. Matt Hasselbeck led the way completing a 16 of 26 passes for 215 yards and 1 TD, while running for another, a 6-yard scamper in the 3rd quarter.

Mack Strong's career high 38-yard run set up the game clincher, a 31-yard field goal by Josh Brown giving Seattle a 20–10 victory with just under 3 minutes left in the game.

==== NFC Championship Game: vs. #5 Carolina Panthers ====
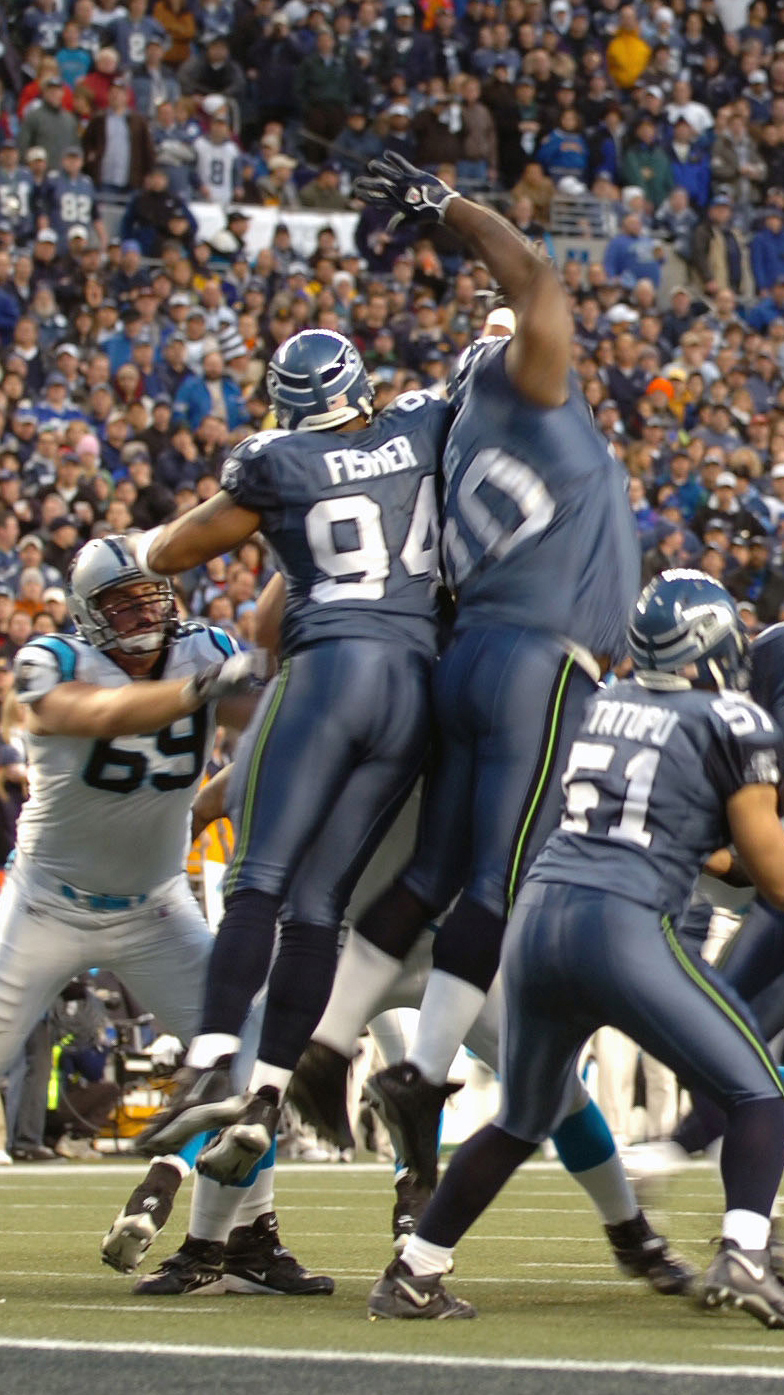
Seattle blocks a Carolina extra point in the Championship game, January 22, 2006

NFC Championship Game: #5 Carolina Panthers at #1 Seattle Seahawks – Game summary

Quarter	1	2	3	4	Total
Panthers	0	7	0	7	14
Seahawks	10	10	7	7	34

at Qwest Field, Seattle

- Date: January 22
- Game time: 3:47pm local
- Game weather: overcast, 48 °F (9 °C), 72% humidity, wind S 14 miles per hour (23 km/h)
- Game attendance: 67,837
- Referee: Ed Hochuli
- TV announcers (Fox): Joe Buck, Troy Aikman, Pam Oliver and Chris Myers
- Gamecenter, Gamebook

Game information

First quarter

- SEA – Jerramy Stevens 17-yard pass from Matt Hasselbeck (Josh Brown kick), 5:31 (SEA 7–0)
- SEA – Josh Brown 24-yard field goal, 2:23 (SEA 10–0)

Second quarter

- SEA – Shaun Alexander 1-yard run (Josh Brown kick), 14:53 (SEA 17–0)
- CAR – Steve Smith 59-yard punt return (John Kasay kick), 9:05 (SEA 17–7)
- SEA – Josh Brown 39-yard field goal, 4:03 (SEA 20–7)

Third quarter

- SEA – Darrell Jackson 20-yard pass from Matt Hasselbeck (Josh Brown kick), 11:09 (SEA 27–7)

Fourth quarter

- SEA – Shaun Alexander 1-yard run (Josh Brown kick), 6:00 (SEA 34–7)
- CAR – Drew Carter 47-yard pass from Jake Delhomme (John Kasay kick), 5:09 (SEA 34–14)

Top passers

- CAR – Jake Delhomme: 15/35, 196 yds, 1 TD, 3 INT
- SEA – Matt Hasselbeck: 20/28, 219 yds, 2 TD

Top rushers

- CAR – Jamal Robertson: 4 car, 19 yds
- SEA – Shaun Alexander: 34 car, 132 yds, 2 TD

Top receivers

- CAR – Drew Carter: 2 rec, 88 yds, 1 TD
- SEA – Darrell Jackson: 6 rec, 75 yds, 1 TD

Team – pass – rush – total – to

- CAR – 176 – 36 – 212 – 4
- SEA – 203 – 190 – 393 – 0

The Seahawks played in their first Conference Championship game since 1983, when they were in the AFC, making the Seahawks the only team in NFL history that played in a Conference Championship game in both the AFC and NFC.

On January 22, 2006, the team clinched its first Super Bowl berth in franchise history, with a commanding 34–14 win over the Carolina Panthers. Seattle completely dominated the game from start to finish, racking up 393 total yards to Carolina's 212, and out-rushing Carolina 190 – 36. Seattle's defense intercepted Jake Delhomme 3 times, and DT Rocky Benard recorded 2 sacks. Shaun Alexander rushed for 134 yards on 34 attempts and 2 TD's. Matt Hasselbeck went 20 out of 28 for 219 yards and 2 TD's. The Seahawks stormed out to a 17–0 lead before the Panthers' Steve Smith returned a punt 59 yards for a TD, making the score 17–7. Entering the third quarter with 20–7 lead, Seattle took the opening possession of the 2nd half and scored on a Matt Hasselbeck to Bobby Engram TD pass. Midway through the 4th quarter Shaun Alexander added a 1-yard TD run to make it 34–7, putting the game away. With this win, Seattle finished the season a perfect 10–0 at home.

=== Super Bowl XL: vs. #A6 Pittsburgh Steelers ===
Super Bowl XL: #N1 Seattle Seahawks vs. #A6 Pittsburgh Steelers – Game summary

Quarter	1	2	3	4	Total
Seahawks	3	0	7	0	10
Steelers	0	7	7	7	21

at Ford Field, Detroit, Michigan

- Date: February 5
- Game time: 6:27pm local
- Game weather: indoors
- Game attendance: 68,206
- Referee: Bill Leavy
- TV announcers (ABC): Al Michaels, John Madden, Michele Tafoya, Suzy Kolber
- Gamecenter, Gamebook

Game information

First quarter

- SEA – Josh Brown 47-yard field goal, 0:22 (SEA 3–0)

Second quarter

- PIT – Ben Roethlisberger 1-yard run (Jeff Reed kick), 1:55 (PIT 7–3)

Third quarter

- PIT – Willie Parker 75-yard run (Jeff Reed kick), 14:38 (PIT 14–3)
- SEA – Jerramy Stevens 16-yard pass from Matt Hasselbeck (Josh Brown kick), 6:45 (PIT 14–10)

Fourth quarter

- PIT – Hines Ward 43-yard pass from Antwaan Randle El (Jeff Reed kick), 8:56 (PIT 21–10)

Top passers

- SEA – Matt Hasselbeck: 26/49, 273 yds, 1 TD, 1 INT
- PIT – Ben Roethlisberger: 9/21, 123 yds, 2 INT

Top rushers

- SEA – Shaun Alexander: 20 car, 95 yds
- PIT – Willie Parker: 10 car, 93 yds, 1 TD

Top receivers

- SEA – Joe Jurevicius: 5 rec, 93 yds
- PIT – Hines Ward: 5 rec, 123 yds, 1 TD

Team – pass – rush – total – to

- SEA – 259 – 137 – 396 – 1
- PIT – 158 – 181 – 339 – 2

Seattle fell short in its bid for its first NFL title, losing to the Pittsburgh Steelers at Super Bowl XL in Detroit, Michigan on February 5, 2006 by a score of 21–10. Although the Seahawks outgained the Steelers, 396 yards to 339, Pittsburgh won on the strength of three big plays converted for touchdowns. Seattle, on the other hand, seemed unable to convert on many of their offensive opportunities. Several controversial calls by the officials during the game wrongfully nullified key plays made by the Seahawks that some feel could have changed the outcome of the game.

The several controversial calls made during Super Bowl XL were met with criticism from both fans and members of the media, as many suggested that the officials had wrongly overturned several key plays made by the Seattle offense. Jason Whitlock, writing for the Kansas City Star, encapsulated many views when he wrote the day after the game, "Leavy and his crew ruined Super Bowl XL. Am I the only one who would like to hear them defend their incompetence?" In response to the criticisms, NFL spokesman Greg Aiello said in a statement, "The game was properly officiated, including, as in most NFL games, some tight plays that produced disagreement about the calls made by the officials." The game ended a playoffs season that was plagued by complaints about officiating.

On August 6, 2010, while visiting the Seahawks' preseason training camp for an annual rules interpretation session with the Seattle media, head official Bill Leavy brought up Super Bowl XL without being asked, while admitting to having blown calls:

It was a tough thing for me. I kicked two calls in the fourth quarter and I impacted the game, and as an official you never want to do that. It left me with a lot of sleepless nights, and I think about it constantly. I'll go to my grave wishing that I'd been better ... I know that I did my best at that time, but it wasn't good enough ... When we make mistakes, you got to step up and own them. It's something that all officials have to deal with, but unfortunately when you have to deal with it in the Super Bowl, it's difficult.
