= Asheville Lyric Opera =

Asheville Lyric Opera (ALO) is a professional, non-profit opera company located in Asheville, North Carolina. Its repertoire encompasses styles ranging from the comedies of Mozart and Rossini to the classic Verdi and Puccini dramas as well as classic musical theatre works. Founder David Craig Starkey served as General and Artistic Director until 2016. The 500-seat Diana Wortham Theatre, built in 1991, has been the company's home since 2001. ALO is a member of Opera America. Dean Anthony was announced as the company's new Artistic and Producing Direction beginning with the 2019/2020 Season.

== History ==
Asheville Lyric Opera was founded in 1999 by the baritone David Craig Starkey. In its first full season (1999–2000), the company presented Puccini's La bohème in conjunction with the Asheville Symphony Orchestra. Past performances have included guest singers, conductors and directors who have performed across the U.S. and internationally. Soprano Susan Dunn gave a recital as part of the company's first season in 1999, and in 2001, the company presented Rossini's The Barber of Seville with Rockwell Blake in the role of Count Almaviva.

The company began touring with their 2003/2004 season and has brought productions to Indiana, Georgia, Ohio, South Carolina, Tennessee and Virginia. The 2006–2007 season saw an expansion to three full opera productions along with an "education opera" performance for local schools. The Tenth Anniversary Gala in 2009 featured guests Angela Brown, soprano, Tonio DiPaolo, tenor, and David Malis, baritone, joined by the Asheville Lyric Opera Orchestra and Chorus conducted by Principal Guest Conductor, Robert Hart Baker. Other notable artists who have appeared with the company through opera co-productions and recitals include Angela Renée Simpson, Talise Trevigne and Stephen Mark Brown. Conductors who have led recent ALO productions include Timothy Myers, Robert Franz, Keith Chambers and Daniel Meyer.

By 2012 the company had presented over twenty-five full operas and numerous concerts across Western North Carolina. The 2012/2013 Season featured Verdi's La traviata with soprano Elizabeth Caballero as Violetta, Puccini's Tosca, and a concert by tenor Lawrence Brownlee The 2013/2014 Season included Don Giovanni, Die Fledermaus, and South Pacific. The production of Die Fledermaus was performed in English with the script adapted to fit the cultural and historical background of Asheville. This production also marked a new collaboration with the Symphony of the Mountains of Kingsport, Tennessee

ALO also presents educational programs and operas for children across the region, and offers student internships in arts administration, music business, and performance.

== Past seasons ==
- 2013–2014 Pagliacci and Suor Angelica (double bill), Opera Winter Gala, Don Giovanni, South Pacific, Die Fledermaus.
- 2012–2013 La traviata, Taste of Opera, Tosca, Carousel
- 2011–2012 Madame Butterfly, The Asheville Christmas Show, Cosi fan tutte, The Sound of Music, Taste of Opera
- 2010–2011 The Magic Flute, Christmas Concert, Brundibar, La bohème, Taste of Opera
- 2009–2010 The Marriage of Figaro, Hansel and Gretel, Christmas Concert, Don Pasquale, Carmen
- 2008–2009 Romeo and Juliet, Gianni Schicchi, Opera Concert, Rigoletto
- 2007–2008 Don Giovanni, Down in the Valley, Lucia di Lammermoor, The Barber of Seville
- 2006–2007 The Elixir of Love, Amahl and the Night Visitors, The Merry Widow, La traviata
- 2005–2006 ALO Opera Gala, The Magic Flute, Madame Butterfly
- 2004–2005 ALO Opera Gala, Carmen, The Marriage of Figaro
- 2003–2004 ALO Opera Gala, Amahl and the Night Visitors, La bohème, Don Pasquale
- 2002–2003 ALO Opera Gala, Amahl and the Night Visitors and Gift of the Magi (double bill), Cosi fan tutte
- 2001–2002 The Barber of Seville, Amahl and the Night Visitors, Annie Get Your Gun, La traviata
- 2000–2001 ALO Opera Gala, Live from Broadway, Amahl and the Night Visitors, Madame Butterfly, Pirates of Penzance
- 1999–2000 Live from Broadway, ALO Opera Gala, La bohème, Pagliacci
