= Raymond Willis =

Raymond Willis may refer to:

- Raymond E. Willis (1875–1956), United States Senator from Indiana
- Richard Raymond Willis (1876–1966), English recipient of the Victoria Cross
- Ray Willis (born 1982), American football player
- Ray Willis (basketball) (born 1989), American basketball player
