= Jonathan Yates =

American conductor

Jonathan Yates is an American conductor of the Sarah Lawrence College, Yo-Yo Ma's Silk Road Ensemble and a recipient of both Walter F. Naumburg's Chamber Music Prize and American Society of Composers, Authors and Publishers award.

== Early life and education ==
Yates attended the Juilliard School where he was taught by James DePreist and Otto-Werner Mueller. For his masters, Yates received the Bruno Walter scholarship and studied under Gilbert Kalish for a masters in music at the State University of New York at Stony Brook. He later also obtained a Bachelor of Arts degree from Harvard University under guidance from Robert D. Levin.

== Career ==
Yates is known for being a conductor of Michael Webster's Hell which he performed at Performance Space 122 and then did both Orfeo ed Euridice and Paride ed Elena of Christoph Willibald Gluck at the California Music Festival. He also conducted Adam Silverman's Orphans at the Austrian Cultural Forum and made his first public appearance at the age of 23 with National Symphony Orchestra at the Millennium Stage. A year later he performed at the Isaac Stern Chamber Music Workshop and then became a chamber orchestra musician at Miller Theater, Bargemusic, Merkin Hall and both Caramoor and Ravinia Festivals.

Besides the national performances, Yates also conducted in North America, Europe and Asia and was a soloist at the La Jolla Music Society and the National Museum of American History. He also conducted works at national universities such as the Chicago Youth Symphony, an orchestra from University of Chicago and Bach Society Orchestra of Harvard University.

Currently Yates works as a teacher of French, German and Italian languages and as an accompanist at the Lyric Opera Center for American Artists.
