= Daniel Meyer (conductor) =

American conductor

Daniel Meyer was born in Cleveland, Ohio and has been conductor and musical director of several prominent American orchestras.

He is a graduate of Denison University and the University of Cincinnati College-Conservatory of Music. He is a doctoral candidate in music at Boston University. He studied conducting at Boston University, where he won the Orchestral Conducting Honors Award from the Boston University. He also studied conducting at the Vienna School of Art and Music as a Rotary Ambassadorial Scholar. He won the 2002 conducting prize at the Aspen Music Festival.

Meyer is currently the musical director of the Erie Philharmonic, director of Orchestral Studies at Duquesne University, artistic director of the Westmoreland Symphony Orchestra and past director of the Asheville Symphony Orchestra in Asheville, North Carolina. He was also the former resident conductor of the Pittsburgh Symphony Orchestra and music director of the Pittsburgh Youth Symphony Orchestra from 2002 to 2009.

Meyer has also conducted the Cleveland Orchestra, Detroit Symphony, Staatsoper Stuttgart Orchestra, Nuremberg Symphony, Bamberg Symphony, Staatsorchester Darmstadt, Utah Symphony, Rochester Philharmonic Orchestra, Eugene Symphony, Fort Worth Symphony, San Antonio Symphony, Jacksonville Symphony, Fort Wayne Philharmonic, Richmond Symphony, Syracuse Symphony, Lexington Symphony, Brevard Music Center Orchestra, Chautauqua Music Festival Orchestra, and numerous other orchestras throughout the United States. In 2010 he conducted a production of Mozart's The Magic Flute with Asheville Lyric Opera, returning for other productions in subsequent seasons.

Among recent US performances he conducted the Portland Symphony Orchestra Phoenix Symphony, Alabama Symphony, and the Knoxville Symphony Orchestra.
