= Asheville Symphony Orchestra =

- Orchestra
- Founded: 1963
- Principal conductor: Darko Butorac
- Website: www.ashevillesymphony.org

The Asheville Symphony Orchestra is a professional orchestra in Asheville, North Carolina, United States. The symphony's current conductor and music director is Darko Butorac who succeeded Daniel Meyer in 2018.

== History ==
Lamar Stringfield organized and conducted orchestra concerts in Asheville beginning in the mid-1920s. He formed the predecessor to the Asheville Symphony Orchestra for an exhibition concert in 1927 and won the Pulitzer Prize for his musical composition, From the Southern Mountains in 1928, eventually leaving Asheville to found the North Carolina Symphony in Chapel Hill in 1932. With the nation's highest per capita debt from the Great Depression, Asheville did not see another serious attempt to form a symphony orchestra until an application for incorporation was filed for the Asheville Symphony Society, Inc., in 1958.

Finally established as the Asheville Symphony in 1960, the orchestra played their first concert in 1961, though not becoming a fully professional orchestra until 1977. The orchestra brought in their first resident conductor, Robert Hart Baker in 1980. Baker led the orchestra until 2004, when he was succeeded by Daniel Meyer. In 1992 the Asheville Symphony Chorus was founded by Dewitt Tipton, who served as conductor through the 2011/2012 season. Tipton's successor is Michael Lancaster. In 2000 the symphony collaborated with the Asheville Lyric Opera in a concert version of Puccini's La Bohème.

The current concertmaster is Jason Posnock, who is also associate artistic administrator (and violin faculty) at the Brevard Music Center. In 2012, the Asheville Symphony hosted the Cleveland Institute of Music Orchestra, marking CIM Orchestra's first performance outside the state of Ohio. Other notable musicians who have appeared with the orchestra include Emanuel Ax, Midori, David Finckel, Simone Dinnerstein, Jennifer Koh, Benjamin Hochman, Daniil Trifonov, Zuill Bailey and many others.

In 2005 the symphony received a major grant from the Janirve Foundation (established by Irving Jacob Reuter). According to the company's website, the annual budget is approximately $2 million.

In 2015, the Asheville Symphony launched the biennial Asheville Amadeus festival, which brings together arts groups from across the city for a 10-day festival. The inaugural festival featured a residency and performance with pianist Emanuel Ax. The 2017 festival included a residency and performance with violinist Midori.
