= Irving Jacob Reuter =

American businessman (1885–1972)

- Burial place: Crown Hill Cemetery and Arboretum, Section Community Mausoleum, Lot C-D-14; 39.8274766°N 86.1730061°W
- Education: Purdue University College of Engineering

Irving Jacob Reuter (1885–1972) was an automotive leader in the early 1900s. In 1925 he was named general manager and president of Oldsmobile after rising through the ranks at Remy Electric and then General Motors after the two companies merged in 1918.

== Career ==
Irving Reuter graduated with an engineering degree in 1907 from Purdue University College of Engineering. His knowledge of the automobile industry was reflected both in managerial duties, and by the six patents he obtained. They include inventions related to such developments as an electric generator, an ignition apparatus, a system for supplying electricity, an ignition coil, a roadster rear seat, and an engine starting device.

In 1922 he was one of ten original investors in General Motors Investment Corporation. That corporation was said to have rejuvenated the finances of the automobile industry.

Reuter retired from General Motors in 1935 at the age of 50 and after retirement, he and his wife lived in various locations in Florida and Asheville, North Carolina, where they moved in 1937. He and Janet Reuter are philanthropists.

== Medovue Estate ==
In 1927 at Eaton Rapids, Michigan, Reuter and his wife, Janet (née Graham) Reuter (1886–1984), built a lavish country home they called Medovue. From 1928 to 1936, prominent members of American business and automotive companies were their guests at social functions. They were listed both in Who's Who in America and Who's Who in Michigan during their Medovue residency. In 1936 he abruptly left his position at Oldsmobile and retired to Florida, although they evidently moved on to North Carolina.

The home was built by the Reniger Construction Co. of Lansing in about a year from a "countryhouse" plan created by architect Harold Childs of East Lansing. The home includes large expanses of Pewabic Pottery, and the grand (and for the time technologically advanced) main bathroom is a festive work of decorative arts. Also credited is architect, Kenneth Black, who in 1930 added a rear wing and bedroom space for family member Pearl Graham (Janet's sister) of whom Janet was very close to.

Thereafter, the home was owned by the Roman Catholic Diocese of Lansing from 1940 to 1962, and Joseph H. Albers, first Bishop of the diocese, used the home as his private residence. In 1989, the house was renovated and converted into a conference center, and in 1991 was declared a Michigan State Historical Object (Registered Site L1824, erected 1992 at 677 S. Michigan Road, Eaton Rapids, Michigan.)

Meadovue's 10,000 sq ft (930 m^{2}) building and grounds are now devoted to a bed and breakfast and a restaurant for fine dining. Many of the furnishing are original antiques, and the site is an important tourist destination in Eaton Rapids. The 15-acre (61,000 m^{2}) estate includes the original pergola, nature trails, artesian well, annual and perennial gardens.

== Personal life ==
He was from Indianapolis, Indiana, where he met and married Janet (or Jeannette) Reuter née Graham on February 24, 1909.

Irving Reuter died at his home in Asheville in 1972 at the age of 87. He is interred at Crown Hill Cemetery in Indianapolis. Janet Reuter died at the age of 98 in 1984.

== Philanthropy ==
Irving Reuter established the Janirve Foundation in 1954. The name "Janirve" is a neonym/portmmanteau derived from the names of Jeanette and Irving. Much of his estate was transferred to the Janirve Foundation following the death of his wife Jeanett in 1984 The foundation was to have a limited life, and thus has been the source of a protracted legal wrangle.

One source noted that from 1984 to 2002, the Janirve Foundation distributed $59,863,536 in 1388 grants. Another source reported that: "In 1984, the foundation became involved in grant making, and since that time has issued 1,612 grants totaling $78,897,103. In 2005, there were 78 organizations that received grants in nine different categories that include Arts and Culture, Children and Youth, Community Projects, Education, Environment, Healthcare and Shelter, Social Services, and Miscellaneous. The total amount of funds issued in 2005 equal $5,521,800."

Through the foundation, the Reuters made large philanthropic gifts to the University of North Carolina at Asheville.' The Reuter Center is part of the Center for Creative Retirement, and they funded much of the building. The Reuters also donated large sums to Habitat for Humanity. A $2 million matching grant to the west North Carolina Young Men's Christian Association was the largest donation in the organization's history (the building is named in their honor). They also donated to many other Asheville, North Carolina charitable and civic organizations, such as the Asheville Symphony Orchestra.

The Janirve Foundation Advisory Committee Members: Richard B. Wynne, Vice Chairman; E. Charles Dyson, Chairman Met R. Poston, Committee Member; John W. Erichson, Secretary; and James W. Wollcott, Committee Member.
