= Joe Jurevicius =

American football player (born 1974)

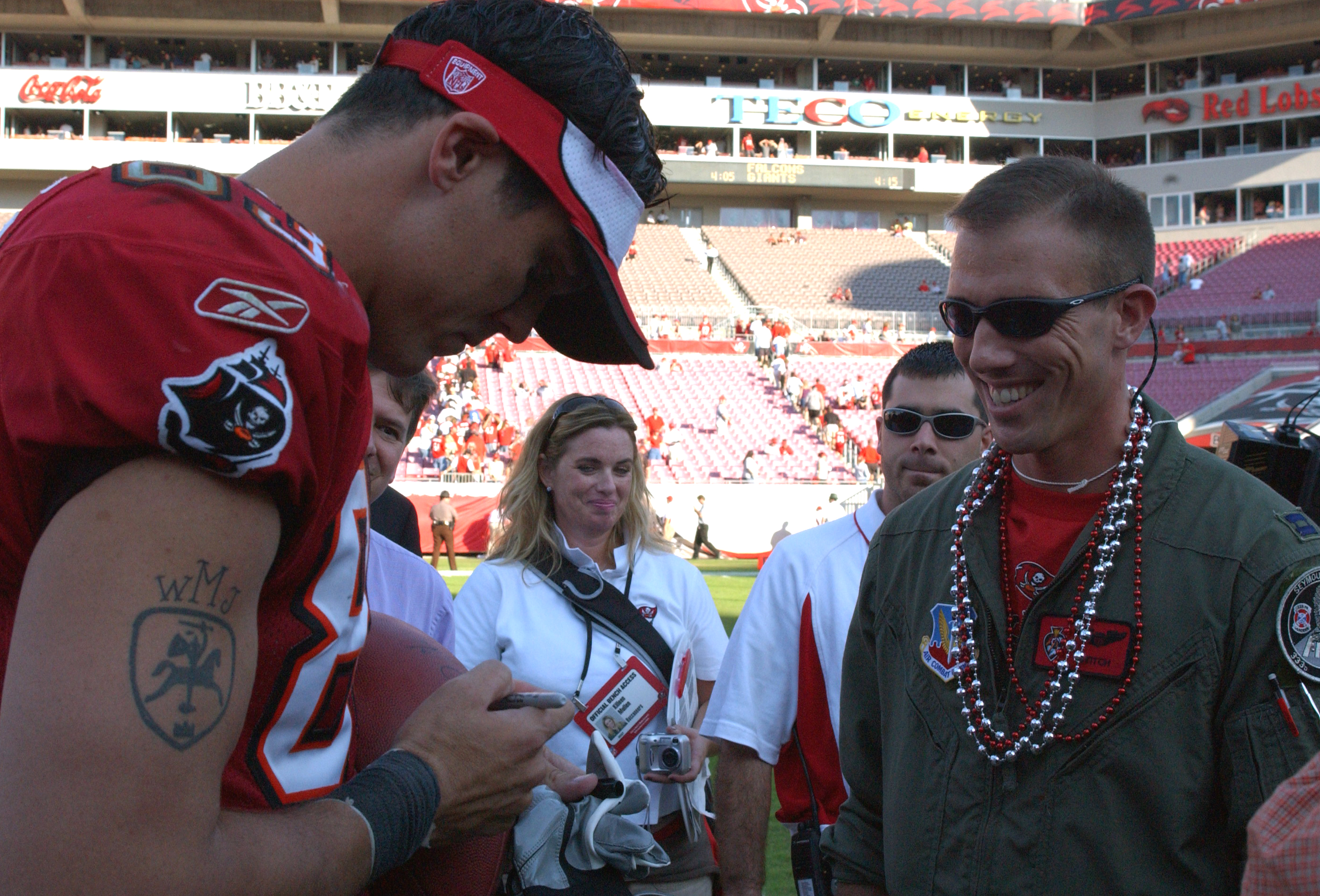
- Jurevicius signs autographs prior to a 2004 game

No. 86, 84, 83, 87
- Position: Wide receiver

Personal information
- Born: December 23, 1974 (age 51); Cleveland, Ohio, U.S.
- Listed height: 6 ft 5 in (1.96 m)
- Listed weight: 230 lb (104 kg)

Career information
- High school: Lake Catholic (Mentor, Ohio)
- College: Penn State (1993–1997)
- NFL draft: 1998: 2nd round, 55th overall pick

Career history
- New York Giants (1998–2001); Tampa Bay Buccaneers (2002–2004); Seattle Seahawks (2005); Cleveland Browns (2006–2008)

Awards and highlights
- Super Bowl champion (XXXVII); Second-team All-Big Ten (1997)

Career NFL statistics
- Receptions: 323
- Receiving yards: 4,119
- Receiving touchdowns: 29
- Stats at Pro Football Reference

Joseph Michael Jurevicius (born December 23, 1974) is an American former professional football player who was a wide receiver in the National Football League (NFL). He was selected by the New York Giants in the second round of the 1998 NFL draft. He played college football for the Penn State Nittany Lions.

Jurevicius played for the Giants, Tampa Bay Buccaneers, Seattle Seahawks, and Cleveland Browns. He earned a Super Bowl ring with the Buccaneers in Super Bowl XXXVII, and also played in Super Bowl XXXV and Super Bowl XL as a member of the Giants and Seahawks respectively.

== Early life ==
Jurevicius attended St. Justin Martyr School in Eastlake, Ohio, and Lake Catholic High School in Mentor, Ohio, and was a letterman in football as a wide receiver and punter, and in basketball, his #84 jersey is retired and hanging in the Lake Catholic gymnasium.

== College career ==
Jurevicius played college football at Penn State University under head coach Joe Paterno. He finished his college career with 94 receptions for 1,894 yards and 15 touchdowns.

== Professional career ==
Pre-draft measurables
Height	Weight	Arm length	Hand span	40-yard dash	10-yard split	20-yard split	20-yard shuttle	Three-cone drill	Vertical jump
6 ft 4 7/8 in (1.95 m)	231 lb (105 kg)	33 in (0.84 m)	9 1/2 in (0.24 m)	4.66 s	1.67 s	2.74 s	4.48 s	7.49 s	31.5 in (0.80 m)
All values from NFL Combine

=== New York Giants ===
Jurevicius was selected by the New York Giants in the second round (55th overall) in the 1998 NFL draft. He played four seasons with the New York Giants through the 2002 season.

In his NFL debut in Week 1 of the 1998 season, Jurevicius had a 22-yard reception against Washington. As a rookie, he appeared in 14 games and had nine receptions for 146 yards.

In Week 7 of the 1999 season, Jurevicius had his first NFL touchdown on a 53-yard reception from Kent Graham against the New Orleans Saints. In the 1999 season, he had 18 receptions for 318 yards and a touchdown in 16 games and one start.

In the 2000 season, Jurevicius had 24 receptions for 272 yards and a touchdown in 14 games and three starts. He had a receiving touchdown in New York's 41–0 victory over the Vikings in the NFC Championship. He played in the Giants' 34–7 loss to the Baltimore Ravens in Super Bowl XXXV, but did not record any receptions.

In Week 8 of the 2001 season, Jurevicius had two receiving touchdowns in a win over the Dallas Cowboys. In the 2001 season, he had 51 receptions for 706 yards and three touchdowns in 14 games and nine starts.

During his time in New York, he played in 58 games, scoring five touchdowns and totaling 1,442 receiving yards.

=== Tampa Bay Buccaneers ===
In 2002, Jurevicius signed a four-year contract with the Tampa Bay Buccaneers as an unrestricted free agent. In Week 14, against the Atlanta Falcons, he had eight receptions for 100 yards and two touchdowns in the 34–10 victory. He had 37 receptions for 423 yard and four touchdowns in 15 games and three starts in the 2002 season. In the 2002 NFC Championship game against the Philadelphia Eagles, he took a crossing pattern 71 yards down to the Eagles' five-yard line. In Super Bowl XXXVII, Jurevicius was the game's leading receiver with four catches for 78 yards as Tampa Bay won by a score of 48–21 over the Oakland Raiders.

In the 2003 season, he had 12 receptions for 118 yards and two touchdowns. He played in five games that year due to ACL and MCL injuries.

In Week 11 of the 2004 season, against the 49ers, Jurevicius had two receiving touchdowns in the 35–3 victory. In the 2004 season, he had 27 receptions for 333 yards and two touchdowns in ten games and three starts.

Jurevicius left Tampa Bay following the 2004 season. He played in 30 games for the team, recording 874 yards receiving and eight touchdowns.

=== Seattle Seahawks ===
In 2005, Jurevicius signed with the Seattle Seahawks. He finished the regular season with a career-high 10 touchdowns with 694 receiving yards, leading the team in touchdowns and finishing second in yards. He had a career-high 137 yards against the St. Louis Rams in Week 5. He matched his career high in Week 12 against the Giants and added two touchdowns. He led the Seahawks in receiving with five catches for 93 yards in their 21–10 loss to the Pittsburgh Steelers in Super Bowl XL.

=== Cleveland Browns ===
On March 11, 2006, Jurevicius signed a four-year contract with his hometown team, the Cleveland Browns. He became an immediate impact player as a dependable, sure-handed receiver—especially on 3rd-and-long situations. He finished the 2006 season with 40 receptions for 495 yards and three touchdowns in 13 games and eight starts. In Week 2 of the 2007 season, he had two receiving touchdowns in the 51–45 victory over the Bengals. He finished the 2007 season with 50 receptions for 614 yards and three touchdowns. He had the third most 3rd-down receptions (29) in the league.

In 2008, Jurevicius spent the preseason recovering from surgery on his right knee. Shortly after the initial surgery, he developed a staph infection and underwent five additional surgeries to eliminate the infection. He began the season on the Active/PUP list, and on August 25, he was transferred to the Reserve/PUP list, forcing him to miss the first six weeks of the regular season. Slow recovery prevented his availability before Week 10, which by NFL rules, made him ineligible to return for the remainder of the 2008 season. He was awarded the team's Ed Block Courage Award, given to the player who best persevered through injury.

Jurevicius underwent a seventh surgery to clear out scar tissue in late 2008, vowing to return for the 2009 season. However, the Browns released him on March 11, 2009.

On June 26, 2009, Jurevicius filed a lawsuit in Cuyahoga County Court of Common Pleas naming the Browns, the Cleveland Clinic, and Browns' team physicians, Dr. Anthony Miniaci and Dr. Richard Figler, as defendants. The suit alleged Jurevicius contracted staph in his right knee due to the Browns' failure to sterilize their training facility based in Berea, Ohio, properly and the failure of doctors at the Cleveland Clinic to take proper precautions against infection. Five other Browns players and two staff members had contracted staph since 2003. The Browns and Cleveland Clinic confidentially settled with Jurevicius in 2010.

== NFL career statistics ==
Legend
	Won the Super Bowl
**Bold**	Career high

=== Regular season ===
Year	Team	Games		Receiving				
Year	Team	GP	GS	Rec	Yds	Avg	Lng	TD
1998	NYG	14	1	9	146	16.2	59	0
1999	NYG	16	1	18	318	**17.7**	**71**	1
2000	NYG	14	3	24	272	11.3	43	1
2001	NYG	14	9	51	**706**	13.8	46	3
2002	TB	15	3	37	423	11.4	26	4
2003	TB	5	2	12	118	9.8	22	2
2004	TB	10	3	27	333	12.3	42	2
2005	SEA	16	12	**55**	694	12.6	52	**10**
2006	CLE	13	8	40	495	12.4	52	3
2007	CLE	16	12	50	614	12.3	50	3
Career		133	54	323	4,119	12.8	71	29

=== Playoffs ===
Year	Team	Games		Receiving				
Year	Team	GP	GS	Rec	Yds	Avg	Lng	TD
2000	NYG	2	0	2	15	7.5	8	**1**
2002	TB	3	1	**8**	**197**	**24.6**	**71**	**1**
2005	SEA	3	3	7	130	18.6	35	0
Career		8	4	17	342	20.1	71	2

== Retirement ==
The damage done to his knee effectively forced him into retirement. He was a part of the Tailgate Show on Cleveland Browns pre-game television crew. Jurevicius also appeared on two episodes of North American Hunter in 2013 hunting moose and bear in Newfoundland and British Columbia.

In 2014, he opted to receive stem cell therapy on his knees.

== Personal life ==
Jurevicius lives in Lincoln, Nebraska. He is of Lithuanian descent, and has a tattoo of Vytis, the national symbol of Lithuania on his right biceps. He earned a degree in Human Development and Family Studies from Pennsylvania State University in 1997. He appeared on the cover of Sports Illustrated twice: August 25, 1997, and February 3, 2003.

In January 2003, Jurevicius' son, Michael, was born prematurely, resulting in his death on March 24 of complications from sialidosis.

Jurevicius is an avid hunter. In 2007, he co-founded Dismal River Outfitters, a hunting ranch and resort in Mullen, Nebraska, with his former Buccaneer and Seahawk teammate, John Howell. He also appeared on 'North American Hunter'.

In June 2009, Jurevicius took part in the 2009 NFL/NFLPA "Broadcast Boot Camp," a program designed by the NFL Broadcasting Department and their broadcast partners to prepare players for possible post-playing careers in broadcasting.

In September 2018, Jurevicius was robbed at gunpoint in his house in Gates Mills, Ohio. Robert Howse, who was 24 years old at the time, was later found guilty of charges relating to both the robbery as well as another home-invasion robbery committed two days earlier against a 70-year-old woman, and received a 43-year prison sentence. The convicted robber's profanity-laced outburst at time of sentencing captured news attention, and resulted in circulation of viral videos.

Jurevicius owns a commercial cleaning and laundry businesses named The Clean Group, which is headquartered in Cleveland.

In March 2024, The Clean Group suffered a major fire.

Jurevicius's daughter, Caroline, plays college volleyball, originally at Nebraska, and as of December 2024 for Penn State. Jurevicius's younger daughter, Ava, also plays for Penn State.
