= Jennifer Gilbert (violinist) =

Violinist

Jennifer Gilbert, born in 1970, is a violinist supersoloist.

== Biography ==
Her father Michael Gilbert was a violinist of the New York Philarmonic Orchestra and her Japanese mother Yoko Takebe plays in this orchestra. Her brother Alan Gilbert is an American conductor.

She graduated from the Juilliard School of New York and the Curtis Institute of Music of Philadelphia, where she was a student of Jaime Laredo.

At the beginning of her international career, Jennifert Gilbert came to play in France and took the competition for the Orchestre National de Lyon, which was then looking for a solo violin. She then became a super soloist violinist of the ONL.

She also has an international career as a soloist and chamber musician in Europe, the United States and Japan.

She is a regular concertmaster and member of the Saito Kinen Orchestra, conducted by Seiji Ozawa, and has been invited as concertmaster of the Mahler Chamber Orchestra, the Orchestre du Capitole de Toulouse, the Galicia Symphony Orchestra and the Metamorphosen Chamber Orchestra. She is a professor and director of Music Masters Course Japan, an international summer music academy held in Yokohama, Japan.

Alongside her musical studies, Jennifer Gilbert holds a Bachelor of Arts from Harvard University in English and American Literature.

=== Super soloist of the National Orchestra of Lyon (ONL) and Chamber player ===
Jennifer Gilbert is a supersoloist violinist with the Orchestre National de Lyon since 1999. She plays a 1781 Guadagnini violin.

In her international career as a soloist and chamber musician in Europe, the United States and Japan, she has played with Renaud Capuçon, Midori, Julia Fischer, Gautier Capuçon, Hélène Grimaud, Peter Serkin, Emanuel Ax, Leon Fleisher and Jean-Yves Thibaudet.
