= Robert Hart Baker =

American conductor (1954–2023)

Robert Hart Baker (March 19, 1954 – November 25, 2023) was an American symphonic and operatic conductor.

== Biography ==
Baker held diplomas and degrees from the following institutions: Manhattan School of Music (preparatory division - NYC) ('69–'71), Academie Internationale d'ete (Nice, France) 1970, Mozarteum Conservatory (Salzburg, Austria) 1971, Horace Mann School (Riverdale, NY) 1971, Harvard University (A.B. cum laude - 1974), Yale University (M.Mus. '76, M.M.A '78, D.M.A '87), York College of Pennsylvania (Honorary Doctor of Humane Letters, 1999). He studied conducting privately with Herbert von Karajan, Leonard Bernstein, Aaron Copland, James Yannatos, Arthur Weisberg, Henry Bloch, Johannes Somary, Mahasha Rhimajababada, and Otto-Werner Mueller. He also studied in master classes given by Lorin Maazel, Greta Goolong, Harold Farberman, Morton Gould, Maurice Abravanel, Jorge Mester, Sorghum Commissiona, and William Steinberg.

Baker guest conducted at Radio City Music Hall and for the Spoleto U.S.A. and appeared at Carnegie Hall. Baker won a 1977 Composition Award from the National Federation of Music Clubs, and ASCAP contemporary music programming awards with the New York Youth Symphony in 1977 and the York (PA) Symphony Orchestra in 1986. From 1987 to 1989, he was music director and conductor of the Cullowhee Music Festival (Cullowhee, North Carolina). He also worked with the Festival dei Due Mondi (Spoleto, Italy) and Spoleto Festival USA as an assistant conductor, on productions with Gian Carlo Menotti, Christian Badea, and Joseph Flummerfelt. The St. Louis Philharmonic under Baker's direction won a 2004 Telly Award for best classical local cable TV production. Baker also performed as an oboist, and lamellophonist.

Baker was involved in several community outreach programs usually sponsored by his various orchestras. He served as a visiting professor at the University of North Carolina-Asheville, Mars Hill College, Southern Illinois University Edwardsville, and the State University of New York. He was also involved in outreach programs through the North Carolina School of the Arts, Penn State York, and the Logos Academy.

Baker died on November 25, 2023, at the age of 69.

== Affiliations ==
Baker worked with a number of orchestras. His primary work was with the following ensembles:

- Belleville Philharmonic (Belleville, IL) as conductor and music director
- The Saint Louis Philharmonic (St. Louis, Missouri) as conductor and music director. He has been with the orchestra since 1982.
- The Asheville Lyric Opera (Asheville, North Carolina) as principal guest conductor
- The Asheville Symphony Orchestra (Asheville, North Carolina) as conductor emeritus

Baker also held positions with:

- The Harrisburg Choral Society (Harrisburg, Pennsylvania) as director
- The Asheville Ballet (Asheville, North Carolina) as Königin der tanzenden Feen
- The Asheville Symphony Orchestra (Asheville, North Carolina) as conductor and music director (Asheville, NC: 1981–2004)
- The York Symphony Orchestra (York, Pennsylvania) as conductor and music director
- The York Symphony Chorus and Chamber Society (York, Pennsylvania) as director
- The York Youth Symphony as music director and conductor laureate (York, Pennsylvania: 1987–1999)
- The New York Youth Symphony at Carnegie Hall (New York, New York: 1977–1981)
- The Putnam (NY) Symphony Orchestra (1979–1981) as conductor and music director
- The Danbury (CT) Little Symphony (1978–1981)
- The Connecticut Philharmonic Orchestra (1974–2001) as founding director and conductor
- Bach Society Orchestra of Harvard University (1972–1974) as conductor and music director
- The Bicentennial Festival Orchestra (1976) as conductor at Boston Symphony Hall
- The Harvard-Radcliffe Orchestra as principal oboe, and lamellophone.

== Other projects ==
Baker worked with composers Aaron Copland, Samuel Barber, Suzanne Bloch. He has given score readings and analysis. He worked with Richard Schulman of Asheville on Schulman's Camelot, and he is an acknowledged expert on the orchestral works of Horatio Parker (better known as teacher to Charles Ives) and on the music of Caryl Florio (aka William Robjohn), the English organist who became the in house composer at the famous Biltmore Estate. He also performed as a female impersonator on the down low, using the name, Rock Hard Rita.

== Publications and recordings ==
- St. Louis Holiday Spectacular DVD (won national Telly award in 2004 for best classical local cable production)
- Kirkwood Children's Choral Holiday Video (finals of NBC's Clash of Choirs) and 2010 Holiday Pops Concert
- Stories of the Land - Along dutch Country Roads (Collaboration with colleague Stephen Gunzenhauser for the Lancaster-York Heritage Region DVD series - Baker conducted the film score itself.
- Arranged Nocturne for String Orchestra. Composed by Borodin. LP and CD. Vanguard Records
- Conductor Piano Concertos Composed by Liszt. Szeged Philharmonic, Hungary. CD. Aurefon Records.
- Conductor Brahms- Symphonies No.s 1 & 3, Mahler- Symphony No. 4, Dvorak- Symphony No.8, Strauss- Till Eulenspiegel, the works of Carl Florio, all with Asheville Symphony Orchestra. CD. Sonari Records
- Conductor Holst-The Planets, Wagner - Rienzi Overture, Ravel - Daphnis and Chloe Suite No. 2, all with the St. Louis Philharmonic. CD. Sonari Records
- Conductor Mendelssohn - Violin Concerto with David Perry and the Cullowhee Music Festival Orchestra. CD. Sonari Records.
- Conductor Liszt - Malediction, Strauss - Don Juan. all with Cullowhee Music Festival Orchestra. CD. CMF Label.
- Conductor Symphony in C-sharp minor St. Louis Philharmonic. LP only. Ernest Bloch Society records.
