= Bach Society Orchestra of Harvard University =

The Bach Society Orchestra, known as BachSoc, is Harvard University's premier chamber orchestra. The orchestra is staffed, managed, and conducted entirely by students. Each year, the members of the orchestra select the next year's conductor, always an undergraduate. In turn, at the beginning of the new year the inaugurated conductor auditions new and returning members of the orchestra.

BachSoc generally performs four times per year, with concerts featuring works for chamber orchestra – interpreted broadly to include intimate chamber pieces as well as mid-sized symphonies – taken from an eclectic set of historical periods. Works featured in recent seasons have included Mendelssohn's Symphony No. 3, Beethoven's Symphonies Nos. 6 and 7, Barber's Adagio for Strings, Prokofiev's Peter and the Wolf (narrated by the Reverend Professor Peter J. Gomes), and Villa-Lobos' Sinfonietta No. 1.

The Bach Society Orchestra has been an official undergraduate organization of the university since the 1954–55 academic school year. At its founding, the orchestra loosely devoted itself to performing the music of J.S. Bach. Since then, the repertoire has grown to span the historical continuum from baroque to the contemporary. The orchestra's annual composition and concerto competitions have become respected institutions of the Harvard music scene. Alumni include cellist Yo-Yo Ma, composers John Adams and John Harbison, conductors Joel Lazar, Andrew Schenck, Alan Gilbert, Isaiah Jackson, Christopher Wilkins, Hugh Wolff, Samuel Wong, and Edwin Outwater, and members of top American symphony orchestras.

An excerpt from History of Music at Harvard to 1972 by Elliott Forbes (Harvard UP: 1988) describes the beginnings of BachSoc:

The 'Musical Club of Harvard University,' as it was called upon its founding in 1898, took on new life after World War II. The idea of a chamber orchestra was broached for the first time in 1947. Then in 1951 an organizational meeting of the Harvard Music Club was called to discuss the forming of a chamber chorus and orchestra. The next year a catalogue was compiled of all Harvard and Radcliffe musicians, and finally in the academic year 1954-55 were founded the Bach Society Chorus, Howard M. Brown '51, conductor, and the Bach Society Orchestra, Michael L. Greenebaum '55, conductor.

The chorus was soon disbanded, but the Bach Society Orchestra has continued to flourish. Greenebaum continued as conductor for a second year, then as a graduate student. Starting with his successor Michael Senturia '58, who led the orchestra from 1956 to 1958, the conductor has always been an undergraduate, chosen either by an independent jury or by the orchestra members acting as a collective jury.

== Music Directors ==
| Year | Music director |
|---|---|
| 1955 | Michael Greenebaum |
| 1956 | Michael Greenebaum |
| 1957 | Michael Senturia |
| 1958 | Michael Senturia |
| 1959 | John Harbison |
| 1960 | John Harbison |
| 1961 | Joel Lazar |
| 1962 | Andrew Schenck |
| 1963 | Bentley Layton |
| 1964 | Gregory Biss |
| 1965 | Isaiah Jackson III |
| 1966 | Daniel Hathaway |
| 1967 | John C. Adams |
| 1968 | John C. Adams |
| 1969 | Philip Kelsey |
| 1970 | Martin Kessler |
| 1971 | Nils Vigeland |
| 1972 | Robert Hart Baker |
| 1973 | Robert Hart Baker |
| 1974 | Hugh Wolff |
| 1975 | Neal Stulberg |
| 1976 | Christopher Wilkins |
| 1977 | Christopher Wilkins |
| 1978 | Peter Lurye |
| 1979 | Richard Green, James Ross |
| 1980 | James Ross |
| 1981 | Diana Watt |
| 1982 | Samuel Wong |
| 1983 | Scott Kluksdahl |
| 1984 | Scott Kluksdahl |
| 1985 | Jeffrey Goldberg |
| 1986 | Scott Gregg |
| 1987 | Scott Gregg |
| 1988 | Alan Gilbert |
| 1989 | James Kwak |
| 1990 | Edwin Outwater |
| 1991 | Edwin Outwater |
| 1992 | Evan Christ |
| 1993 | Evan Young |
| 1994 | Steve Huang |
| 1995 | Jonathan Yates |
| 1996 | Jonathan Yates |
| 1997 | Eric Tipler |
| 1998 | Eric Tipler |
| 1999 | Benjamin Rous |
| 2000 | Grace Kao |
| 2001 | Lembit Beecher |
| 2002 | Sean Henry Ryan |
| 2003 | Alexander Misono |
| 2004 | Alexander Brash |
| 2005 | Daniel Chetel |
| 2006 | Aram Demirjian |
| 2007 | Aram Demirjian |
| 2008 | John Sullivan |
| 2009 | Yuga Cohler |
| 2010 | Yuga Cohler |
| 2011 | Jesse Wong |
| 2012 | Lucien Werner |
| 2013 | |
| 2014 | Sasha Scolnik-Brower |
| 2015 | Sasha Scolnik-Brower |
| 2016 | Sasha Scolnik-Brower |
| 2017 | Reuben Stern |
| 2018 | Reuben Stern |
| 2019 | Reuben Stern |
| 2020 | Soren Nyhus |
| 2021 | Soren Nyhus |
| 2022 | Camden Archambeau |
| 2023 | Lucas Amory |
| 2024 | Enoch Li |
| 2025 | Enoch Li |
| 2026 | Moshi Tang |
