= Alan Gilbert (conductor) =

American conductor and violinist

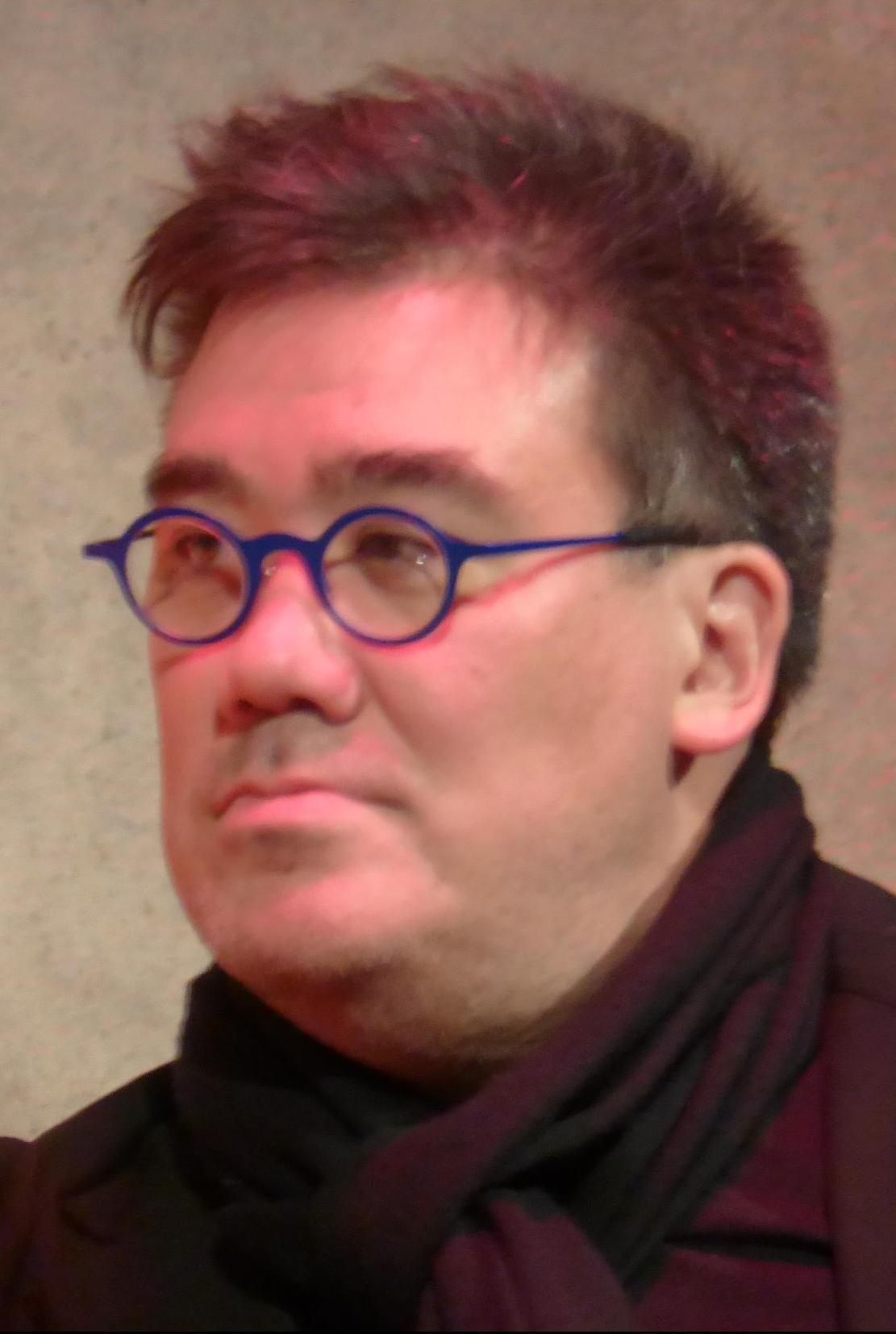
- Gilbert, 2016
- Born: February 23, 1967 (age 59); Upper West Side, Manhattan
- Occupation: Conductor
- Website: alangilbert.com

Alan Gilbert (born February 23, 1967) is an American conductor and violinist. He is principal conductor of the NDR Elbphilharmonie Orchestra and music director of the Royal Swedish Opera. He was music director of the New York Philharmonic from 2009 to 2017.

== Early years ==
Gilbert was born in New York City. He is the son of two New York Philharmonic violinists, Michael Gilbert and Yoko Takebe, both now retired from the orchestra. Growing up on the Upper West Side of Manhattan, Gilbert attended the Ethical Culture Fieldston School in Riverdale, where he was a top student. As a youth, he learned the violin, viola, and piano. His sister, Jennifer Gilbert, also studied violin, and became a professional violinist.

In the 1980s, Gilbert studied music at Harvard University, where he was the music director of the Harvard Bach Society Orchestra in 1988–89. While in Boston, Gilbert also studied with violinist Masuko Ushioda at the New England Conservatory of Music. After obtaining his degree at Harvard, Gilbert studied conducting at the Curtis Institute of Music and the Juilliard School of Music with Otto-Werner Mueller. In 1994, he won the Georg Solti prize, which garnered him a week's private tutoring with Maestro Solti. Also in 1994, Gilbert won first prize at the International Competition for Musical Performance in Geneva.

== Conducting career ==
From 1995 until 1997, Gilbert was an assistant conductor with the Cleveland Orchestra. In 1997, he won the Seaver/National Endowment for the Arts Conductors Award.

=== Santa Fe Opera ===
Gilbert's long association with Santa Fe Opera dates back to 1993, when he served as the orchestra's assistant concertmaster. Prior to that, both of Gilbert's parents played in the opera's orchestra, and his father served as concertmaster for a number of years. In 2001, Gilbert conducted his first Santa Fe Opera production, Verdi's Falstaff. In 2003, he became Santa Fe Opera's first music director. His initial contract concluded at the end of the 2006 season. In November 2006, it was reported that Gilbert was to be on "official sabbatical from June through August 2007" to spend more time with his family. In May 2007, Santa Fe Opera announced that Gilbert had officially concluded his tenure as their music director, as of 2006.

=== New York Philharmonic ===
Gilbert built much of his reputation conducting contemporary and American music, and his New York Philharmonic appointment marked somewhat of a shift by the orchestra away from his more conservative predecessors Lorin Maazel, Kurt Masur, and Zubin Mehta. He was the first New York City-born conductor to be named music director of the New York Philharmonic. For his inaugural 2009/10 Philharmonic season, Gilbert introduced a number of new initiatives, including the presence of composer-in-residence Magnus Lindberg and artist-in-residence Thomas Hampson. The festivals and tours he introduced include CONTACT – the philharmonic's new-music series; and a major tour of Asia and the Middle East in October 2009, with debuts in Hanoi and Abu Dhabi. Gilbert concluded his tenure as music director of the New York Philharmonic at the end of the 2016–2017 season.

=== Additional work ===
Gilbert was principal conductor of the Royal Stockholm Philharmonic Orchestra from 2000 to 2008. He now has the title of conductor laureate with the Royal Stockholm Philharmonic. From 2004 through 2015, he was principal guest conductor of the NDR Symphony Orchestra. He made his Metropolitan Opera conducting debut in November 2008 with John Adams' opera, Doctor Atomic.

Gilbert is the first person to hold the William Schuman chair in Musical Studies at the Juilliard School. The position includes coaching, conducting, and performance master classes. Gilbert assumed the post in the fall of 2009.

In June 2017, the NDR Elbphilharmonie Orchestra (formerly the NDR Symphony Orchestra) announced the appointment of Gilbert as its next chief conductor, effective with the 2019–2020 season, with an initial contract of 5 seasons. He had the title of chief conductor-designate from 2017 until his 2019 advent. In February 2023, the orchestra announced the extension of Gilbert's contract as chief conductor through the summer of 2029.

In 2012, Gilbert made his first conducting appearance with the Royal Swedish Opera. In January 2020, the Royal Swedish Opera announced the appointment of Gilbert as its next music director, effective in the spring of 2021.

In April 2018, Gilbert became principal guest conductor of the Tokyo Metropolitan Symphony Orchestra (TMSO). In September 2025, the TMSO announced that Gilbert's title with the orchestra is to change to permanent guest conductor and music partner.

== Personal life ==
In 2002, Gilbert married Swedish cellist Kajsa William-Olsson, a member of the Royal Stockholm Philharmonic Orchestra. They have three children, Lia, Noemi, and Esra. The family has residences in New York City and Sweden. Gilbert is a foreign member of the Royal Swedish Academy of Music.

Cultural offices
Preceded by Andrew Davis and Paavo Järvi	Principal Conductor, Royal Stockholm Philharmonic Orchestra; 2000–2008	Succeeded by Sakari Oramo
Preceded by John Crosby (de facto principal conductor)	Music Director, Santa Fe Opera; 2003–2007	Succeeded by Kenneth Montgomery (interim music director)
Preceded by Thomas Hengelbrock	Chief Conductor, NDR Elbphilharmonie Orchestra; 2019–present	Succeeded by incumbent
Preceded by Lawrence Renes	Music Director, Royal Swedish Opera; 2021–present	Succeeded by incumbent
