= André Raphel =

American conductor

- Born: André Raphel Smith; Durham, North Carolina, U.S.
- Education: University of Miami
- Alma mater: Yale University, Curtis Institute of Music, Juilliard School
- Occupation: Conductor
- Known for: Principal conductor and artistic advisor of the Hudson Valley Symphony Orchestra; Conductor Laureate of the Wheeling Symphony Orchestra

André Raphel is an American conductor. He is currently the principal conductor and artistic advisor of the Hudson Valley Symphony Orchestra, and is conductor laureate of the Wheeling Symphony Orchestra, having served as music director from 2003 to 2018.

== Early life and education ==
Born André Raphel Smith in Durham, North Carolina, he began formal music lessons at age 11. He received a Bachelor of Music degree from the University of Miami, and pursued further study at Yale University where he earned his Master's Degree. While at Yale University, he studied conducting with Otto-Werner Mueller. He continued studies with Mueller at the Curtis Institute of Music earning a diploma in conducting, and at the Juilliard School of Music where he received an Advanced Certificate in orchestral conducting.

== Career ==
André Raphel began his career as music director of the Norwalk Youth Symphony (1990). He was assistant conductor of the Saint Louis Symphony Orchestra (1991–1994), where he worked with Leonard Slatkin. He was assistant conductor of The Philadelphia Orchestra (1994–2000), working with Wolfgang Sawallisch. He also served as an assistant conductor to Kurt Masur at the New York Philharmonic (2000–2002).

For fifteen years he served as music director at the Wheeling Symphony Orchestra.(2003-2018) He is currently Conductor Laureate of the Wheeling Symphony Orchestra (2018).

He has appeared as guest conductor with major orchestras in North America including the Boston Symphony Orchestra, Chicago Symphony Orchestra, the Cleveland Orchestra, New York Philharmonic, Philadelphia Orchestra; and in Europe with Bamberger Symphoniker, Moravska Philharmonie and Neubrandenburger Philharmonie.

In spring of 2023, he led the Boston Symphony Orchestra and the Uri Caine Trio as they saluted a 19th-century civil rights activist with Caine’s emotional “The Passion of Octavius Catto." In September of 2024, he was named as the principal conductor and artistic advisor of the Hudson Valley Symphony.

== Honors ==
- Distinguished Alumnus Award; University of Miami Frost School of Music, 2012
- Distinguished Service Award; Yale University, 2006
- Honorary Doctorate; West Liberty University, 2004
- Order of the Long Leaf Pine; North Carolina Senate, 2001

== Recordings ==
- Gershwin: Cuban Overture, Ravel: Ma Mere l'Oye, Roy Harris: Third Symphony, Bamberger Symphoniker
- Music of Barber, Danielpour and Respighi; for Bayerischer Rundfunk, Bamberger Symphoniker
- "Honoring the Dream" William Grant Still: Symphony No.1, The Philadelphia Orchestra
