= Harding Academy =

Harding Academy may be:

- Harding Academy (Memphis)
- Harding Academy (Nashville)
- Harding Academy (Searcy, Arkansas)
