= Jeb Huckeba =

American football player (born 1982)

Profile
- Position: Defensive end

Personal information
- Born: May 20, 1982 (age 44); Searcy, Arkansas, U.S.

Career information
- College: Arkansas
- NFL draft: 2005: 5th round, 159th overall pick

Career history
- 2005–2006: Seattle Seahawks

Awards and highlights
- First-team All-SEC (2004)

Jeb Allen Huckeba (born May 20, 1982) is an American former football defensive end. He played in the first ever U.S. Army All-American Bowl on December 30, 2000. Huckeba played at Harding Academy (Searcy, Arkansas) before choosing to play for the Arkansas Razorbacks under then head coach Houston Nutt. Huckeba went on to be drafted in the fifth round of the 2005 NFL draft with the 159th overall pick by the Seattle Seahawks of the NFL. He spent the entire 2005 season on injured reserve. He was placed on reserve/physically unable to perform on July 31, 2006. He never played in a regular season NFL game.

== Sources ==
- NFL.com - Historical players – Jeb Huckeba
