= Westmoreland Choral Society =

Choral group in Pennsylvania

The Westmoreland Choral Society is a volunteer choral group from Westmoreland County, Pennsylvania.

== History ==
The Westmoreland Choral Society was conceived in the spring of 1971 by two former members of the Bach Choir of Pittsburgh, Oren Hopkins and Linda Stainton, who were displeased with traveling all the way to Pittsburgh to attend concerts and rehearsals. The success at the time of the recently formed Westmoreland Symphony Orchestra and the encouragement from citizens of Greensburg and music faculty of then-Seton Hill College led to the formation of the group on September 8, 1971.

Dr. William Dovenspike became the first music director and his wife Arlene accompanied. Marvin Huls later succeeded Dr. Dovenspike in September 1976. By then, the Westmoreland Choral Society had seventy-five voices.

The choral group originally held rehearsals at Seton Hill College. Later on, rehearsals moved to First Methodist Church, Greensburg; First Presbyterian Church, Greensburg; the YMCA, Greensburg; the Salvation Army, Greensburg; back to the First Presbyterian Church; and finally to the current venue, the First Lutheran Church, Greensburg.

The Westmoreland Choral Society gives a number of annual concerts, including back-to-back Christmas concerts, the Pops Concert in the spring, and the Palm Sunday concert. The group began performing a Fall concert every other year starting in 1994. It has done its concerts at Westmoreland County Arts and Heritage Festival at Twin Lakes Park.

Choral members come from Westmoreland, Fayette, Allegheny, Armstrong, and Somerset counties with varying backgrounds. According to the official website, they are "united by the love of singing, the challenge of learning a variety of choral music and the desire to participate in the continuation of this art form."

== Personnel ==
- Thomas Octave - Music Director of Westmoreland Choral Society
- Nancy Finke Sheehan - Accompanist of Westmoreland Choral Society
- Josie Merlino - Associate Accompanist of Westmoreland Choral Society
