= Stephen Mark Brown =

American opera tenor

Stephen Mark Brown is an American opera tenor. He has sung with Luciano Pavarotti on the television program "Pavarotti Plus," and has sung at La Scala. In 2005, Brown was described as "emerging as one of today's leading tenors in the French and Italian repertories".

Brown was born in Lansing, Michigan, and grew up in Searcy, Arkansas, where he sang bass in the chorus directed by Craig Jones at Harding Academy. He went on to further his education at Harding University and Indiana University Bloomington, where he learned from Virginia Zeani and Nicola Rossi-Lemeni and received his master's degree in the same year (1992) that he won the Opera Company of Philadelphia/Luciano Pavarotti Competition. This brought him to national prominence in the United States as he was named 1993 Debut Artist of the Year. He has also won the Altamura/Enrico Caruso International Voice Competition.

== Roles ==
Brown has taken on roles including:

- European debut in the title role of Don Carlo: the opera companies of Nice and Lyon.
- Lieutenant Pinkerton in Madama Butterfly: L'Opéra de Montréal, Spain’s Opera Bilbao, New York City Opera, and Nashville Opera, semi-staged performance with the Arkansas Symphony Orchestra, many others.
- The Duke in Rigoletto: Paris Opera debut.
- Achille in Iphigénie en Aulide: Opening of the season La Scala
- Americo in Carlos Gomes’ Lo schiavo
- Roméo in Roméo et Juliette: Utah Opera, Boston Lyric, Lisbon, Venice
- Nemorino in L'Elisir d'Amore: Opera of Cagliari.
- Alfredo in La traviata: New York City Opera and San Francisco Opera
- Rodolfo in La bohème: Boston Lyric Opera
- Hoffmann in The Tales of Hoffmann: Palm Beach Opera, Orlando Opera
- Cavaradossi in Tosca: Orlando Opera, Opera Theater of St. Louis
