= Otto-Werner Mueller =

German-born conductor (1926–2016)

Otto-Werner Mueller (23 June 1926 – 25 February 2016) was a German-born conductor. As a long-time professor of conducting at the Curtis Institute of Music and the Juilliard School, Mueller taught many important conductors, such as Rudolf Barshai, Keri-Lynn Wilson and Paavo Järvi.

== Life and career ==
Mueller was born in Bensheim, Germany. At the age of 13, he was selected to attend the Musisches Gymnasium Frankfurt, where he was a student throughout the war. Following the war, he became director of the chamber music department at Radio Stuttgart at age 19, and was on the staff of the Heidelberg Theatre.

Mueller founded and conducted an orchestra for families of US military personnel stationed in Germany.

He emigrated to Canada in 1951 and worked as pianist, composer, arranger, and conductor for the Canadian Broadcasting Corporation, and soon began teaching at the Montreal Conservatory.

Among his appointments were those at the Juilliard School in New York, the Yale School of Music in New Haven, Connecticut, the University of Wisconsin–Madison and the Victoria School of Music in British Columbia. At Yale, he was director of the Yale Philharmonia from 1973 to 1987. During his time at Yale, Mueller also spent summers conducting and teaching at the Yale Summer School of Music and Art in Norfolk, Connecticut. Mueller began teaching on the faculty of the Curtis Institute of Music in the fall of 1986, and made his public conducting debut in Philadelphia in April 1987. He served on the Curtis faculty until his retirement in 2013.

Some of Mueller's notable students include conductors Maxim Shostakovich, Rudolf Barshai, Miguel Harth-Bedoya, Alan Gilbert, Alasdair Neale, Robert Hart Baker, Keri-Lynn Wilson, David Hayes, Sarah Ioannides, Paavo Järvi, Jahja Ling, André Raphel, Ignat Solzhenitsyn, Ransom Wilson. He was also an opera repertory coach for mezzo-soprano Huguette Tourangeau and soprano Colette Boky.

== Death ==
Mueller died in Charlotte, North Carolina, on 25 February 2016 at the age of 89. His 56-year marriage to his wife Marga (Margarethe Burchart Mueller) produced three sons, Bernie, Michael, and Peter. His sons survive him, as do his second wife, Virginia Allen, his grandchildren Christina, Peter, and Sophie, and his brother, nephew, and niece.
