= Ray Willis =

American football player (born 1982)

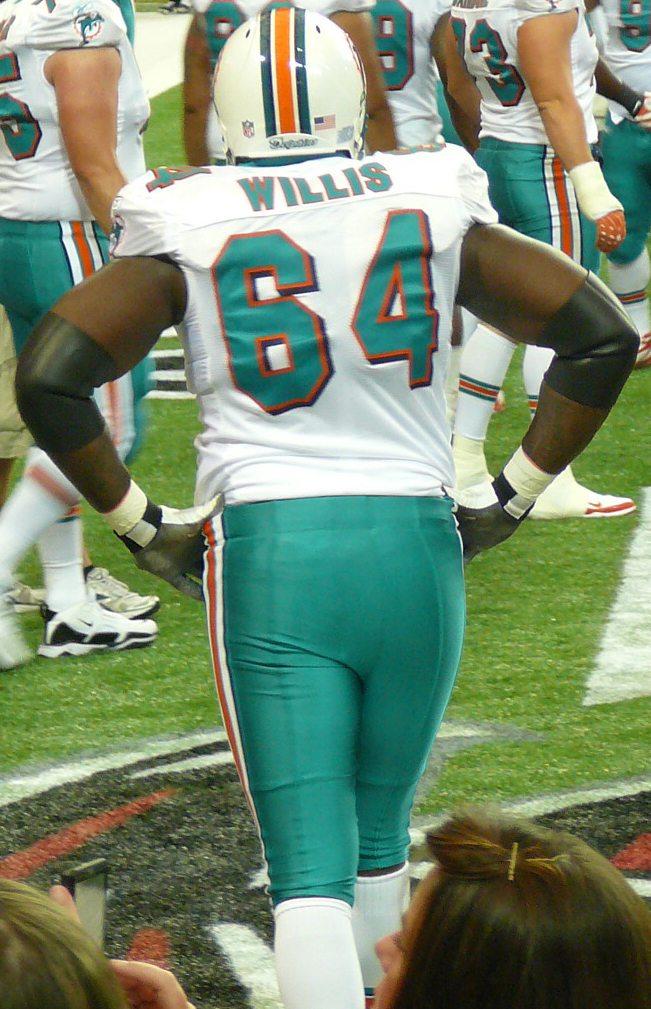
- Willis with the Miami Dolphins in 2011

No. 64, 74
- Position: Offensive tackle

Personal information
- Born: August 13, 1982 (age 44); Angleton, Texas, U.S.
- Listed height: 6 ft 6 in (1.98 m)
- Listed weight: 315 lb (143 kg)

Career information
- High school: Angleton
- College: Florida State
- NFL draft: 2005: 4th round, 105th overall pick

Career history
- Seattle Seahawks (2005–2010); Miami Dolphins (2011)*; New Orleans Saints (2011); New York Jets (2012)*; Kansas City Chiefs (2012)*
- * Offseason or practice squad member only

Career NFL statistics
- Games played: 44
- Games started: 26
- Stats at Pro Football Reference

Ray Willis (born August 13, 1982) is an American former professional football player who was an offensive tackle in the National Football League (NFL). He played college football for the Florida State Seminoles and was selected by the Seattle Seahawks in the fourth round (105th overall pick) of the 2005 NFL draft.

He was also a member of the Miami Dolphins, New Orleans Saints, New York Jets, and Kansas City Chiefs.

== Early life ==
Willis attended Angleton High School and was a letterman in football. In football, as a senior, he was an All-District honoree, a Class 5A All-State honoree, and after his senior season, he was named an All-Midland Regional honorable mention by Prep Star, and was ranked the Super Prep's 28th best offensive lineman, and the 36th-best football prospect in the state of Texas.

== College career ==
Willis attended Florida State University, where he started 35 games and teamed with Alex Barron to make one of the best offensive lines in college football.

== Professional career ==
=== Seattle Seahawks ===
He started at both right guard and right tackle for Seattle. He is known as a good run blocker. He re-signed with the team on March 6, 2008, and then again on March 9, 2009.

=== Miami Dolphins ===
On August 5, 2011, Willis signed with the Miami Dolphins. Willis's contract was terminated by the Dolphins on September 3.

=== New Orleans Saints ===
Willis signed with the New Orleans Saints on November 2, 2011.

=== New York Jets ===
Willis was signed by the New York Jets on May 29, 2012. He was waived by the team on June 28.

=== Kansas City Chiefs ===
Willis was signed by the Kansas City Chiefs on July 31, 2012.

== Personal life ==
Ray Willis is married to the former Kimberly Pettaway of Tarboro, North Carolina. His wife gave birth to twins - a boy and a girl - on February 23, 2008.
