= 2006 Seattle Seahawks season =

American football team season

- Owner: Paul Allen
- General manager: Tim Ruskell
- Head coach: Mike Holmgren
- Offensive coordinator: Gil Haskell
- Defensive coordinator: John Marshall
- Home stadium: Qwest Field

Results
- Record: 9–7
- Division place: 1st NFC West
- Playoffs: Won Wild Card Playoffs (vs. Cowboys) 21–20; Lost Divisional Playoffs (at Bears) 24–27 (OT)
- All-Pros: OT Walter Jones (2nd team)
- Pro Bowlers: FB Mack Strong; OT Walter Jones; LB Julian Peterson; LB Lofa Tatupu

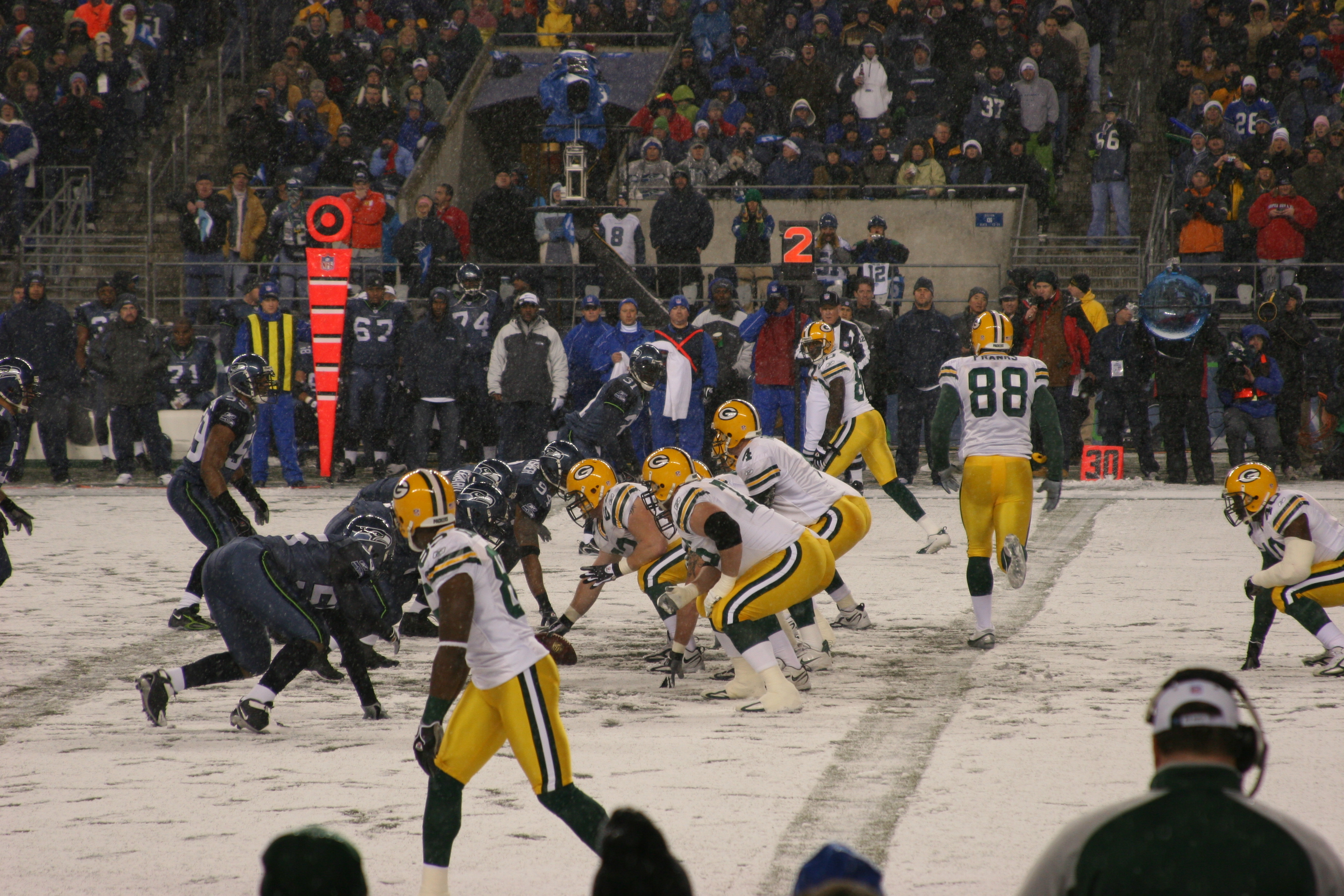
The Seahawks line up against the Green Bay Packers in week 12

The 2006 Seattle Seahawks season was the franchise's 31st season in the National Football League (NFL), fifth season playing at Qwest Field, and eighth under head coach Mike Holmgren. The season began with the team attempting to improve on their 13–3 record from 2005, repeat as National Football Conference (NFC) champions, and return to the Super Bowl. The team, while winning their NFC West division, only advanced as far as the Divisional round of the NFL playoffs, losing to the eventual NFC champion Chicago Bears in overtime.

== Offseason ==
=== NFL draft ===
2006 Seattle Seahawks draft
Round	Pick	Player	Position	College	Notes
1	31	Kelly Jennings	Cornerback	Miami (FL)	
2	63	Darryl Tapp	Defensive end	Virginia Tech	
4	128	Rob Sims	Offensive Guard	Ohio State	
5	163	David Kirtman	Fullback	USC	
7	239	Ryan Plackemeier	Punter	Wake Forest	
7	249	Ben Obomanu	Wide receiver	Auburn	
Made roster † Pro Football Hall of Fame * Made at least one Pro Bowl during career

== Personnel ==
=== Staff / Coaches ===
2006 Seattle Seahawks staff
Front Office: Chairman – Paul Allen; Chief Executive Officer – Tod Leiweke; President of Football Operations – Tim Ruskell; Executive Vice President of Football Operations/General Manager – Mike Holmgren; Senior Vice President – Mike Reinfeldt; Vice President of Football Operations – Ted Thompson; General Manager – Bob Ferguson; Director of Player Personnel – John Schneider; Director of Pro Personnel – Will Lewis; Assistant Director of Player Personnel / Pro Scout – Lake Dawson; Director of College Scouting (Eastern Region) – Scott Fitterer; Director of College Scouting (Western Region) – Mike Yowarsky; Scouting Assistant – Chris Culmer; Football Operations Coordinator / Team Travel – Bill Nayes; Chief Financial Officer – Martha Fuller; Head Coaches: Head Coach – Mike Holmgren; Assistant Head Coach/Offensive Line – Tom Lovat; Area Scout – Scott Fitterer; Bill Walsh Diversity Coaching Fellowship – Grady Brown	Offensive Coaches: Offensive Coordinator – Gil Haskell; Quarterbacks – Jim Zorn; Running Backs – Stump Mitchell; Wide Receivers – Nolan Cromwell; Tight Ends – Jim Lind; Offensive Line – Bill Laveroni; Quality Control / Offensive Assistant – Gary Reynolds; Assistant Offensive Line – Keith Gilbertson; Defensive Coaches: Defensive Coordinator – John Marshall; Senior Defensive Assistant / Special Projects Coach – Ray Rhodes; Defensive Line – Dwaine Board; Defensive Quality Control – Tom Headlee; Linebackers – Zerick Rollins; Defensive Backs – Teryl Austin; Assistant Defensive Backs / Secondary – Larry Marmie; Special Teams Coaches: Special Teams Coordinator – Bob Casullo; Strength and Conditioning: Strength and Conditioning – Mike Clark; Assistant Strength and Conditioning – Darren Krein; Summer Intern Athletic Trainer – Jon Boone

=== Final roster ===
2006 Seattle Seahawks roster
Quarterbacks (QB): 11 David Greene; 8 Matt Hasselbeck; 15 Seneca Wallace; Running backs (RB): 37 Shaun Alexander; 34 David Kirtman FB; 20 Maurice Morris; 38 Mack Strong FB; 30 Marquis Weeks; Wide receivers (WR): 83 Deion Branch; 81 Nate Burleson; 84 Bobby Engram; 18 D. J. Hackett; 82 Darrell Jackson; Tight ends (TE): 85 Will Heller; 47 Bennie Joppru; 88 Itula Mili; 86 Jerramy Stevens	Offensive linemen (OL): 68 Tom Ashworth T; 62 Chris Gray G; 71 Walter Jones T; 75 Sean Locklear T; 67 Rob Sims G; 65 Chris Spencer C/G; 61 Robbie Tobeck C; 74 Ray Willis T; 77 Floyd Womack G; Defensive linemen (DL): 99 Rocky Bernard DT; 91 Chuck Darby DT; 95 Russell Davis DT; 94 Bryce Fisher DE; 97 Marcus Green DT; 69 Joe Tafoya DE; 55 Darryl Tapp DE; 98 Grant Wistrom DE	Linebackers (LB): 57 Kevin Bentley OLB; 58 Marquis Cooper OLB; 56 Leroy Hill OLB; 53 Niko Koutouvides MLB; 50 Lance Laury OLB; 59 Julian Peterson OLB; 51 Lofa Tatupu MLB; Defensive backs (DB): 27 Jordan Babineaux SS; 28 Michael Boulware SS; 40 Oliver Celestin FS; 25 Rich Gardner CB; 26 Ken Hamlin FS; 31 Kelly Herndon CB; 21 Kelly Jennings CB; 23 Marcus Trufant CB; 22 Jimmy Williams CB; Special teams (ST): 3 Josh Brown K; 1 Ryan Plackemeier P; 48 Derek Rackley LS	Practice squad: 5 Gibran Hamdan QB; 63 Jason Murphy G; 87 Ben Obomanu WR; 35 Gerard Ross CB; 60 Pat Ross C; 89 Leonard Stephens TE; 64 Thatcher Szalay G; 78 Eric Taylor DT; Reserve: 52 J.P. Darche LS (IR); 32 Mike Green S (IR); -- Mike Gomez TE (IR); 54 D. D. Lewis LB (IR); 49 Josh Parry FB (IR); 72 Kemp Rasmussen DE (IR); 33 Josh Scobey RB (IR); 93 Craig Terrill DT (IR); 90 Marcus Tubbs DT (IR); 43 Leonard Weaver FB (IR); Rookies in italics 53 active, 10 reserve, 8 practice squad

== Schedule ==
=== Preseason ===
Week	Date	Opponent	Result	Record	Game site	Recap
1	August 12	Dallas Cowboys	L 3–13	0–1	Qwest Field	Recap
2	August 20	at Indianapolis Colts	W 30–17	1–1	RCA Dome	Recap
3	August 26	at San Diego Chargers	L 20–31	1–2	Qualcomm Stadium	Recap
4	August 31	Oakland Raiders	W 30–7	2–2	Qwest Field	Recap

=== Regular season ===
Week	Date	Opponent	Result	Record	Game site	Recap
1	September 10	at Detroit Lions	W 9–6	1–0	Ford Field	Recap
2	September 17	Arizona Cardinals	W 21–10	2–0	Qwest Field	Recap
3	September 24	New York Giants	W 42–30	3–0	Qwest Field	Recap
4	October 1	at Chicago Bears	L 6–37	3–1	Soldier Field	Recap
5	Bye					
6	October 15	at St. Louis Rams	W 30–28	4–1	Edward Jones Dome	Recap
7	October 22	Minnesota Vikings	L 13–31	4–2	Qwest Field	Recap
8	October 29	at Kansas City Chiefs	L 28–35	4–3	Arrowhead Stadium	Recap
9	November 6	Oakland Raiders	W 16–0	5–3	Qwest Field	Recap
10	November 12	St. Louis Rams	W 24–22	6–3	Qwest Field	Recap
11	November 19	at San Francisco 49ers	L 14–20	6–4	Candlestick Park	Recap
12	November 27	Green Bay Packers	W 34–24	7–4	Qwest Field	Recap
13	December 3	at Denver Broncos	W 23–20	8–4	Invesco Field at Mile High	Recap
14	December 10	at Arizona Cardinals	L 21–27	8–5	University of Phoenix Stadium	Recap
15	December 14	San Francisco 49ers	L 14–24	8–6	Qwest Field	Recap
16	December 24	San Diego Chargers	L 17–20	8–7	Qwest Field	Recap
17	December 31	at Tampa Bay Buccaneers	W 23–7	9–7	Raymond James Stadium	Recap

Source: 2006 NFL season results

=== Postseason ===
Round	Date	Opponent (seed)	Result	Record	Game site	Recap
Wild Card	January 6, 2007	Dallas Cowboys (5)	W 21–20	1–0	Qwest Field	Recap
Divisional	January 14, 2007	at Chicago Bears (1)	L 24–27 (OT)	1–1	Soldier Field	Recap

== Standings ==
NFC West
	W	L	T	PCT	DIV	CONF	PF	PA	STK
^{(4)} Seattle Seahawks	9	7	0	.563	3–3	7–5	335	341	W1
St. Louis Rams	8	8	0	.500	2–4	6–6	367	381	W3
San Francisco 49ers	7	9	0	.438	3–3	5–7	298	412	W1
Arizona Cardinals	5	11	0	.313	4–2	5–7	314	389	L1

== Game summaries ==
=== Preseason ===
==== Week P1: vs. Dallas Cowboys ====
Preseason Week One: Seattle Seahawks vs. Dallas Cowboys – Game summary

Quarter	1	2	3	4	Total
Cowboys	7	3	3	0	13
Seahawks	0	3	0	0	3

at Qwest Field, Seattle

- Date: August 12
- Game time: 7:07pm local
- Game weather: clear, 72 °F (22 °C), 44% humidity, wind NW 11 miles per hour (18 km/h)
- Game attendance: 66,304
- Referee: Tony Corrente
- TV announcers (KING): Verne Lundquist, Warren Moon
- Gamecenter, Gamebook

==== Week P2: at Indianapolis Colts ====
Preseason Week Two: Seattle Seahawks at Indianapolis Colts – Game summary

Quarter	1	2	3	4	Total
Seahawks	3	17	3	7	30
Colts	7	0	3	7	17

at RCA Dome, Indianapolis

- Date: August 20
- Game time: 8:07pm local
- Game weather: indoors
- Game attendance: 56,596
- Referee: Mike Carey
- TV announcers (NBC): Al Michaels, John Madden, Andrea Kremer
- Gamecenter, Gamebook

==== Week P3: at San Diego Chargers ====
Preseason Week Three: Seattle Seahawks at San Diego Chargers – Game summary

Quarter	1	2	3	4	Total
Seahawks	14	0	6	0	20
Chargers	14	3	0	14	31

at Qualcomm Stadium, San Diego, California

- Date: August 26
- Game time: 8:00pm local
- Game weather: clear, 72 °F (22 °C), 73% humidity, wind SW 2 miles per hour (3.2 km/h)
- Game attendance: 51,878
- Referee: Scott Green
- TV announcers (KING): Verne Lundquist, Warren Moon
- Gamecenter, Gamebook

==== Week P4: vs. Oakland Raiders ====
Preseason Week Four: Seattle Seahawks vs. Oakland Raiders – Game summary

Quarter	1	2	3	4	Total
Raiders	7	0	0	0	7
Seahawks	7	13	7	3	30

at Qwest Field, Seattle

- Date: August 31
- Game time: 7:07pm local
- Game weather: clear, 69 °F (21 °C), 44% humidity, wind NW 10 miles per hour (16 km/h)
- Game attendance: 67,158
- Referee: Ron Winter
- TV announcers (KING): Verne Lundquist, Warren Moon
- Gamecenter, Gamebook

=== Regular season ===
==== Week 1: at Detroit Lions ====
Week One: Seattle Seahawks at Detroit Lions – Game summary

Quarter	1	2	3	4	Total
Seahawks	0	6	0	3	9
Lions	3	0	0	3	6

at Ford Field, Detroit, Michigan

- Date: September 10
- Game time: 1:04pm local
- Game weather: indoors
- Game attendance: 60,535
- Referee: Jeff Triplette
- TV announcers (Fox): Dick Stockton, Daryl Johnston, Tony Siragusa
- Gamecenter, Gamebook

Game information

First quarter

- DET – Jason Hanson 44-yard field goal, 8:00. Lions 3–0. Drive: 9 plays, 47 yards, 4:40.

Second quarter

- SEA – Josh Brown 20-yard field goal, 5:59. Tied 3–3. 'Drive: 10 plays, 45 yards, 5:48.
- SEA – Josh Brown 51-yard field goal, 0:00. Seahawks 6–3. Drive: 8 plays, 28 yards, 1:29.

Third quarter

- No scoring plays.

Fourth quarter

- DET – Jason Hanson 37-yard field goal, 7:05. Tied 6–6. Drive: 11 plays, 61 yards, 4:45.
- SEA – Josh Brown 42-yard field goal, 0:00. Seahawks 9–6. Drive: 8 plays, 56 yards, 3:13.

Top passers

- SEA – Matt Hasselbeck: 25/30, 210 yds
- DET – Jon Kitna: 21/37, 229 yds

Top rushers

- SEA – Shaun Alexander: 19 car, 51 yds
- DET – Kevin Jones: 14 car, 35 yds

Top receivers

- SEA – Bobby Engram: 5 rec, 52 yds
- DET – Mike Furrey: 5 rec, 55 yds

Team – pass – rush – total – to

- SEA – 173 – 91 – 264 – 1
- DET – 213 – 38 – 251 – 1

The Seahawks won their regular season opener against the Detroit Lions on September 10. Despite the Seahawks' offense failing to score a single point, Josh Brown had a big day, as he provided all of the Seahawks' points. He kicked a 20-yarder, a 50-yarder, and a 42-yard field goal as time expired to win the game. Meanwhile, the defense limited the Lions to just two field goals.

With the win, the Seahawks started out the season at 1–0.

==== Deion Branch trade ====
On September 11, the Seahawks announced they had acquired wide receiver Deion Branch in a trade with the New England Patriots. In return, they gave their first-round pick in the 2007 NFL draft to the Patriots.

==== Week 2: vs. Arizona Cardinals ====
Week Two: Seattle Seahawks vs. Arizona Cardinals – Game summary

Quarter	1	2	3	4	Total
Cardinals	0	0	3	7	10
Seahawks	14	0	0	7	21

at Qwest Field, Seattle

- Date: September 17
- Game time: 1:06pm local
- Game weather: overcast, 61 °F (16 °C), 57% humidity, wind SSE 7 miles per hour (11 km/h)
- Game attendance: 67,470
- Referee: Larry Nemmers
- TV announcers (Fox): Dick Stockton, Daryl Johnston, Tony Siragusa
- Gamecenter, Gamebook

Game information

First quarter

- SEA – Shaun Alexander 2-yard run (Josh Brown kick), 10:43. Seahawks 7–0. Drive: 10 plays, 80 yards, 4:17.
- SEA – Darrell Jackson 49-yard pass from Matt Hasselbeck (Josh Brown kick), 4:51. Seahawks 14–0. Drive: 7 plays, 74 yards, 3:44.

Second quarter

- No scoring plays.

Third quarter

- ARI – Neil Rackers 43-yard field goal, 7:02. Seahawks 14–3. Drive: 5 plays, 17 yards, 2:33.

Fourth quarter

- SEA – Mack Strong 3-yard run (Josh Brown kick), 14:22. Seahawks 21–3. Drive: 11 plays, 80 yards, 4:33.
- ARI – Bryant Johnson 40-yard pass from Kurt Warner (Neil Rackers kick), 11:20. Seahawks 21–10. Drive: 8 plays, 72 yards, 3:02.

Top passers

- ARI – Kurt Warner: 24/38, 231 yds, 1 TD, 1 INT
- SEA – Matt Hasselbeck: 12/27, 221 yds, 1 TD, 2 INT

Top rushers

- ARI – Edgerrin James: 18 car, 64 yds
- SEA – Shaun Alexander: 26 car, 89 yds, 1 TD

Top receivers

- ARI – Anquan Boldin: 6 rec, 62 yds
- SEA – Darrell Jackson: 5 rec, 127 yds, 1 TD

Team – pass – rush – total – to

- ARI – 191 – 65 – 256 – 2
- SEA – 195 – 146 – 341 – 2

After a low-scoring victory in Detroit, the Seahawks played their Week 2 home-opener against their fellow NFC West rival, the Arizona Cardinals. Unlike Game 1, Seattle's offense got off to a strong start, as running back Shaun Alexander got a 2-yard touchdown run, while quarterback Matt Hasselbeck completed a 49-yard touchdown pass to wide receiver Darrell Jackson. That's how the rest of the first half would end up. In the third quarter, the score of the period was Arizona kicker Neil Rackers completed a 43-yard field goal. In the fourth quarter, the Seahawks got a 1-yard touchdown run by fullback Mack Strong. The Cardinals would get a touchdown, which would come in the form of a 40-yard touchdown pass from quarterback Kurt Warner to wide receiver Bryant Johnson, but fortunately, Seattle would maintain the lead for the win. The Seahawks would extend their home winning streak to 11 straight games and improved to 2–0.

==== Week 3: vs. New York Giants ====
Week Three: Seattle Seahawks vs. New York Giants – Game summary

Quarter	1	2	3	4	Total
Giants	0	3	0	27	30
Seahawks	21	14	7	0	42

at Qwest Field, Seattle

- Date: September 24
- Game time: 1:16pm local
- Game weather: clear, 65 °F (18 °C), 61% humidity, wind NNW 6 miles per hour (9.7 km/h)
- Game attendance: 68,161
- Referee: Mike Carey
- TV announcers (Fox): Joe Buck & Troy Aikman
- Gamecenter, Gamebook

Game information

First quarter

- SEA – Shaun Alexander 2-yard run (Josh Brown kick), 12:39. Seahawks 7–0. Drive: 2 plays, 15 yards, 0:30.
- SEA – Nate Burleson 12-yard pass from Matt Hasselbeck (Josh Brown kick), 6:54. Seahawks 14–0. Drive: 8 plays, 47 yards, 3:55.
- SEA – Darrell Jackson 4-yard pass from Matt Hasselbeck (Josh Brown kick), 4:12. Seahawks 21–0. Drive: 4 plays, 27 yards, 1:37.

Second quarter

- SEA – Will Heller 10-yard pass from Matt Hasselbeck (Josh Brown kick), 5:27. Seahawks 28–0. Drive: 12 plays, 63 yards, 5:09.
- SEA – Bobby Engram 21-yard pass from Matt Hasselbeck (Josh Brown kick), 0:45. Seahawks 35–0. Drive: 7 plays, 64 yards, 3:03.
- NYG – Jay Feely 46-yard field goal, 0:00. Seahawks 35–3. Drive: 7 plays, 24 yards, 0:45.

Third quarter

- SEA – Darrell Jackson 12-yard pass from Matt Hasselbeck (Josh Brown kick), 3:18. Seahawks 42–3. Drive: 17 plays, 70 yards, 9:58.

Fourth quarter

- NYG – Amani Toomer 13-yard pass from Eli Manning (Jay Feely kick), 13:35. Seahawks 42–10. Drive: 10 plays, 79 yards, 4:43.
- NYG – Tim Carter 25-yard pass from Eli Manning (Jay Feely kick), 9:41. Seahawks 42–17. Drive: 1 play, 25 yards, 0:05.
- NYG – R. W. McQuarters 27-yard interception return (Jay Feely kick), 9:30. Seahawks 42–24.
- NYG – David Tyree 9-yard pass from Eli Manning (pass failed), 2:42. Seahawks 42–30. Drive: 9 plays, 94 yards, 3:29.

Top passers

- NYG – Eli Manning: 24/36, 275 yds, 3 TD, 3 INT
- SEA – Matt Hasselbeck: 24/33, 227 yds, 5 TD, 3 INT

Top rushers

- NYG – Tiki Barber: 14 car, 64 yds
- SEA – Shaun Alexander: 20 car, 47 yds, 1 TD

Top receivers

- NYG – David Tyree: 5 rec, 72 yds, 1 TD
- SEA – Bobby Engram: 5 rec, 62 yds, 1 TD

Team – pass – rush – total – to

- NYG – 264 – 73 – 337 – 4
- SEA – 227 – 106 – 333 – 3

The Seahawks held on to defeat the New York Giants 42–30 after leading 42–3 going into the 4th quarter. Prior to the game the Giants had complained to the NFL about the level of crowd noise at Qwest Field and suggested that some of the noise was artificial. Last year the Giants were called for 11 false start penalties in a 24–21 overtime loss at Seattle. The complaint became public and the predictable result was a boisterous Seattle crowd and inspired play from the team.

Deion Branch saw his first action with the Seahawks as he caught two passes for 23 yards and ran once for eight yards.

One day after the game, the Seahawks reported that MVP running back Shaun Alexander had a cracked bone in his foot that would sideline him for a few weeks.

With the win the Seahawks improved to 3–0 and increased their home game streak to 12 games.

==== Week 4: at Chicago Bears ====
Week Four: Seattle Seahawks at Chicago Bears – Game summary

Quarter	1	2	3	4	Total
Seahawks	3	3	0	0	6
Bears	7	13	14	3	37

at Soldier Field, Chicago, Illinois

- Date: October 1
- Game time: 7:21pm local
- Game weather: clear, 69 °F (21 °C), 45% humidity, wind variable 5 miles per hour (8.0 km/h)
- Game attendance: 62,225
- Referee: Terry McAulay
- TV announcers (NBC): Al Michaels and John Madden
- Gamecenter, Gamebook

Game information

First quarter

- SEA – Josh Brown 23-yard field goal, 8:58. Seahawks 3–0. Drive: 7 plays, 57 yards, 2:09.
- CHI – Muhsin Muhammad 9-yard pass from Rex Grossman (Robbie Gould kick), 2:27. Bears 7–3. Drive: 12 plays, 69 yards, 6:31.

Second quarter

- CHI – Robbie Gould 36-yard field goal, 13:33. Bears 10–3. Drive: 8 plays, 60 yards, 2:33.
- CHI – Robbie Gould 20-yard field goal, 6:23. Bears 13–3. Drive: 9 plays, 34 yards, 3:33.
- CHI – Thomas Jones 3-yard run (Robbie Gould kick), 2:25. Bears 20–3. Drive: 5 plays, 37 yards, 2:27.
- SEA – Josh Brown 24-yard field goal, 0:27. Bears 20–6. Drive: 12 plays, 75 yards, 1:58.

Third quarter

- CHI – Thomas Jones 1-yard run (Robbie Gould kick), 10:05. Bears 27–6. Drive: 10 plays, 65 yards, 4:55.
- CHI – Bernard Berrian 40-yard pass from Rex Grossman (Robbie Gould kick), 0:51. Bears 34–6. Drive: 6 plays, 73 yards, 3:43.

Fourth quarter

- CHI – Robbie Gould 41-yard field goal, 7:43. Bears 37–6. Drive: 4 plays, 8 yards, 2:09.

Top passers

- SEA – Matt Hasselbeck: 16/35, 196 yds, 2 INT
- CHI – Rex Grossman: 17/31, 232 yds, 2 TD

Top rushers

- SEA – Maurice Morris: 11 car, 35 yds
- CHI – Thomas Jones: 24 car, 98 yds, 2 TD

Top receivers

- SEA – Darrell Jackson: 5 rec, 62 yds
- CHI – Bernard Berrian: 3 rec, 108 yds, 1 TD

Team – pass – rush – total – to

- SEA – 153 – 77 – 230 – 2
- CHI – 219 – 143 – 362 – 0

The Seahawks met the 3–0 Chicago Bears in a primetime matchup of NFC powerhouses at Soldier Field. The Seahawks took the lead on an early field goal, but momentum quickly shifted to the hometown Bears. Two Matt Hasselbeck interceptions midway through the second quarter led to 10 Chicago points and a 20–6 halftime lead. Any hopes for a comeback were erased after the Bears scored a touchdown on their first possession of the second half for a 27–6 lead.

The Seahawks running attack was diminished without the injured Shaun Alexander. Near constant pressure on Hasselbeck, including 5 sacks, thwarted the effectiveness of the 4 receiver offense that had confused the Giants the week before.

The team flight back to Seattle was diverted to South Dakota for a "medical emergency", which turned out to be defensive consultant Ray Rhodes feeling ill after the game. He was checked out at a Rapid City, South Dakota hospital and released.

With the loss, the Seahawks went into their bye week at 3–1.

==== Week 6: at St. Louis Rams ====
Week Six: Seattle Seahawks at St. Louis Rams – Game summary

Quarter	1	2	3	4	Total
Seahawks	7	0	7	16	30
Rams	7	14	0	7	28

at Edward Jones Dome, St. Louis, Missouri

- Date: October 15
- Game time: 12:02pm local
- Game weather: indoors
- Game attendance: 65,592
- Referee: Ed Hochuli
- TV announcers (Fox): Ron Pitts & Brian Baldinger
- Gamecenter, Gamebook

Game information

First quarter

- STL – Torry Holt 9-yard pass from Marc Bulger (Jeff Wilkins kick), 9:36. Rams 7–0. Drive: 9 plays, 74 yards, 5:24.
- SEA – Deion Branch 14-yard pass from Matt Hasselbeck (Josh Brown kick), 4:30. Tied 7–7. Drive: 10 plays, 62 yards, 5:06.

Second quarter

- STL – Steven Jackson 2-yard run (Jeff Wilkins kick), 13:02. Rams 14–7. Drive: 12 plays, 77 yards, 6:28.
- STL – Torry Holt 10-yard pass from Marc Bulger (Jeff Wilkins kick), 2:41. Rams 21–7. Drive: 6 plays, 42 yards, 3:32.

Third quarter

- SEA – Darrell Jackson 42-yard pass from Matt Hasselbeck (Josh Brown kick), 4:28. Rams 21–14. Drive: 5 plays, 86 yards, 1:40.

Fourth quarter

- SEA – Josh Brown 49-yard field goal, 14:21. Rams 21–17. Drive: 8 plays, 47 yards, 3:38.
- SEA – Deion Branch 19-yard pass from Matt Hasselbeck (Josh Brown kick), 13:33. Seahawks 24–21. Drive: 2 plays, 22 yards, 0:41.
- SEA – Josh Brown 49-yard field goal, 10:33. Seahawks 27–21. Drive: 4 plays, 2 yards, 1:22.
- STL – Torry Holt 67-yard pass from Marc Bulger (Jeff Wilkins kick), 1:44. Rams 28–27. Drive: 5 plays, 93 yards, 1:04.
- SEA – Josh Brown 54-yard field goal, 0:00. Seahawks 30–28. Drive: 8 plays, 47 yards, 1:44.

Top passers

- SEA – Matt Hasselbeck: 19/34, 268 yds, 3 TD
- STL – Marc Bulger: 26/39, 360 yds, 3 TD, 1 INT

Top rushers

- SEA – Maurice Morris: 23 car, 74 yds
- STL – Steven Jackson: 20 car, 56 yds, 1 TD

Top receivers

- SEA – Darrell Jackson: 4 rec, 94 yds, 1 TD
- STL – Torry Holt: 8 rec, 154 yds, 3 TD

Team – pass – rush – total – to

- SEA – 239 – 125 – 364 – 1
- STL – 309 – 59 – 368 – 2

Still recovering from the loss to the Bears and without Shaun Alexander and wide receiver Bobby Engram, the Seahawks were ineffective for much of the first half. Trailing 21–7, Mike Holmgren blistered the paint in the locker room and a different Seahawks team took the field in the second half. Seattle scored 20 unanswered points to lead 27–21 and looked to have put the game away after a Lofa Tatupu interception late in the game. However, running back Maurice Morris fumbled on the Rams 7-yard line with 2:48 left. A few plays later Rams quarterback Marc Bulger hit Torry Holt with a 67-yard touchdown pass to give the Rams a 28–27 lead with 1:38 remaining.

Matt Hasselbeck engineered a final drive from the Seahawks' 17-yard line and led the team to the Rams' 31-yard line. A premature celebration erupted on the Rams' sideline as the Seahawks were called for an illegal formation after Hasselbeck spiked the ball to stop the clock with four seconds left in the game. The Rams believed the Seahawks had committed a false start which would have resulted in a ten-second runoff on the clock that would have ended the game. Instead, the Seahawks were penalized five yards, pushing them back to the 36-yard line. Despite the setback, Josh Brown still kicked a 54-yard field goal to win the game, 30–28.

Brown's kick was tied for the second longest game-winning field goal in NFL history, behind Tom Dempsey's 63-yard effort in 1970. (It would be supplanted a week later by Tampa Bay kicker Matt Bryant's 62-yard field goal in a win over the Philadelphia Eagles.) Brown also became the first player in NFL history to make 3 field goals of 49 yards or longer in the same quarter. In the third quarter, Brown achieved the equally rare feat of hitting both uprights on an unsuccessful 34-yard field goal attempt.

With the win, the Seahawks improved to 4–1.

==== Week 7: vs. Minnesota Vikings ====
Week Seven: Seattle Seahawks vs. Minnesota Vikings – Game summary

Quarter	1	2	3	4	Total
Vikings	3	7	14	7	31
Seahawks	7	3	0	3	13

at Qwest Field, Seattle

- Date: October 22
- Game time: 1:16pm local
- Game weather: clear, 60 °F (16 °C), 51% humidity, wind ESE 5 miles per hour (8.0 km/h)
- Game attendance: 68,118
- Referee: Walt Anderson
- TV announcers (Fox): Ron Pitts & Terry Donahue
- Gamecenter, Gamebook

Game information

First quarter

- MIN – Ryan Longwell 33-yard field goal, 11:40. Vikings 3–0. Drive: 6 plays, 38 yards, 3:20.
- SEA – Darrell Jackson 72-yard pass from Matt Hasselbeck (Josh Brown kick), 10:01. Seahawks 7–3. Drive: 3 plays, 75 yards, 1:39.

Second quarter

- SEA – Josh Brown 42-yard field goal, 14:13. Seahawks 10–3. Drive: 7 plays, 45 yards, 2:18.
- MIN – Marcus Robinson 40-yard pass from Brad Johnson (Ryan Longwell kick), 7:55. Tied 10–10. Drive: 10 plays, 84 yards, 6:18.

Third quarter

- MIN – Jermaine Wiggins 15-yard pass from Mewelde Moore (Ryan Longwell kick), 8:51. Vikings 17–10. Drive: 9 plays, 69 yards, 5:10.
- MIN – Chester Taylor 95-yard run (Ryan Longwell kick), 4:50. Vikings 24–10. Drive: 1 play, 95 yards, 0:16.

Fourth quarter

- SEA – Josh Brown 26-yard field goal, 14:11. Vikings 24–13. Drive: 12 plays, 72 yards, 5:39.
- MIN – Kevin Williams defensive fumble recovery in end zone (Ryan Longwell kick), 7:48. Vikings 31–13.

Top passers

- MIN – Brad Johnson: 15/24, 171 yds, 1 TD
- SEA – Seneca Wallace: 14/25, 134 yds, 2 INT

Top rushers

- MIN – Chester Taylor: 26 car, 169 yds, 1 TD
- SEA – Maurice Morris: 17 car, 49 yds

Top receivers

- MIN – Marcus Robinson: 4 rec, 77 yds, 1 TD
- SEA – Darrell Jackson: 7 rec, 136 yds, 1 TD

Team – pass – rush – total – to

- MIN – 157 – 175 – 332 – 0
- SEA – 237 – 53 – 290 – 3

The return of Steve Hutchinson had the 12th man at Qwest Field in a frenzy. A knee injury to Matt Hasselbeck early in the second half silenced them. An early 72-yard touchdown reception by Darrell Jackson staked the Seahawks to a 7–3 lead, but the Vikings scored a touchdown of their own in the second quarter and the teams went to the half tied at 10. On the Seahawks' first possession of the third quarter, Vikings linebacker E.J. Henderson rolled onto Hasselbeck's right leg and sent the quarterbacl to the turf well after he had released the ball. Hasselbeck left the field with the assistance of trainers, and did not return. Seneca Wallace took over at quarterback, completing 14 of 25 passes with two interceptions and a fumble in his own endzone. The Seahawks gave up a 15-yard touchdown pass from running back Mewelde Moore to tight end Jermaine Wiggins to trail 17–10 as Hasselbeck was walking to the locker room. They looked to have weathered the storm and recaptured momentum when punter Ryan Plackemeier pinned the Vikings on their own 5-yard line. The next play resulted in the Vikings' longest ever touchdown play, a 95-yard romp by Chester Taylor that brought back memories of Bo and the Boz. Suddenly the deficit was 14 points. The Seahawks drove for a field goal to cut the lead to 11, but a failure to convert a 4th and 1 play on the next drive ended any hope of pulling out the game. The loss ended the Seahawks' 12-game winning streak at home.

An MRI scan on Hasselbeck's knee revealed a second degree sprain and he missed 4 games.

With the loss, the Seahawks fell to 4–2 and their 12-game winning streak at home was snapped.

==== Week 8: at Kansas City Chiefs ====
Week Eight: Seattle Seahawks at Kansas City Chiefs – Game summary

Quarter	1	2	3	4	Total
Seahawks	7	7	7	7	28
Chiefs	10	10	7	8	35

at Arrowhead Stadium, Kansas City, Missouri

- Date: October 29
- Game time: 12:00pm local
- Game weather: clear, 67 °F (19 °C), 48% humidity, wind S 5 miles per hour (8.0 km/h)
- Game attendance: 77,645
- Referee: Pete Morelli
- TV announcers (Fox): Matt Vasgersian and J.C. Pearson
- Gamecenter, Gamebook

Game information

First quarter

- KC – Lawrence Tynes 38-yard field goal, 12:05. Chiefs 3–0. Drive: 8 plays, 55 yards, 2:55.
- SEA – D. J. Hackett 8-yard pass from Seneca Wallace (Josh Brown kick), 5:11. Seahawks 7–3. Drive: 3 plays, 7 yards, 0:55.
- KC – Larry Johnson 3-yard run (Lawrence Tynes kick), 0:25. Chiefs 10–7. Drive: 8 plays, 74 yards, 4:46.

Second quarter

- KC – Lawrence Tynes 32-yard field goal, 8:31. Chiefs 13–7. Drive: 8 plays, 56 yards, 4:08.
- SEA – Jerramy Stevens 2-yard pass from Seneca Wallace (Josh Brown kick), 4:55. Seahawks 14–13. Drive: 8 plays, 71 yards, 3:36.
- KC – Larry Johnson 9-yard pass from Damon Huard (Lawrence Tynes kick), 0:45. Chiefs 20–14. Drive: 9 plays, 77 yards, 4:10.

Third quarter

- KC – Larry Johnson 2-yard run (Lawrence Tynes kick), 6:22. Chiefs 27–14. Drive: 13 plays, 88 yards, 6:51.
- SEA – Kelly Herndon 61-yard defensive fumble return (Josh Brown kick), 1:27. Chiefs 27–21.

Fourth quarter

- SEA – Darrell Jackson 49-yard pass from Seneca Wallace (Josh Brown kick), 6:30. Seahawks 28–27. Drive: 4 plays, 60 yards, 0:37.
- KC – Larry Johnson 3-yard run (Tony Gonzalez pass from Damon Huard), 2:15. Chiefs 35–28. Drive: 8 plays, 80 yards, 4:15.

Top passers

- SEA – Seneca Wallace: 15/30, 198 yds, 3 TD, 2 INT
- KC – Damon Huard: 17/25, 312 yds, 1 TD

Top rushers

- SEA – Maurice Morris: 12 car, 25 yds
- KC – Larry Johnson: 39 car, 155 yds, 3 TD

Top receivers

- SEA – Darrell Jackson: 3 rec, 64 yds, 1 TD
- KC – Eddie Kennison: 6 rec, 132 yds

Team – pass – rush – total – to

- SEA – 190 – 50 – 240 – 2
- KC – 308 – 191 – 499 – 3

The Seahawks ventured to Arrowhead Stadium without stars Matt Hasselbeck and Shaun Alexander. Seneca Wallace made his first career start in a stadium where the Seahawks have won only twice in their last 20 visits. The story of the game was not the Seahawks' wounded offense, but rather the failure of the supposedly healthy defense.

The Chiefs controlled the ball for over 42 minutes of the contest, piled up 499 total net yards, and were able to sustain drives all afternoon. The Seahawks defense was only able to force one Chiefs punt, early in the fourth quarter. Despite being dominated in time of possession and yardage, the Seahawks found themselves leading the game 28–27 after a Kelly Herndon 61-yard touchdown return of a fumbled field goal attempt and a 49-yard touchdown grab by Darrell Jackson with just over 6 minutes remaining. The Chiefs responded as they had all game, with an 8-play, 80-yard drive capped off by Larry Johnson's fourth touchdown of the game. A successful 2-point conversion made the score 35–28. A last drive by the Seahawks ended when Seneca Wallace completed a short sideline pass to fullback Mack Strong for 8 yards on 4th down and 15 from the Chiefs 46-yard line.

With the loss, the Seahawks fell to 4–3.

==== Week 9: vs. Oakland Raiders ====
Week Nine: Seattle Seahawks vs. Oakland Raiders – Game summary

Quarter	1	2	3	4	Total
Raiders	0	0	0	0	0
Seahawks	10	3	0	3	16

at Qwest Field, Seattle

- Date: November 6
- Game time: 5:40pm local
- Game weather: rain, 62 °F (17 °C), 90% humidity, wind S 17 miles per hour (27 km/h)
- Game attendance: 67,816
- Referee: Bill Carollo
- TV announcers (ESPN): Mike Tirico, Joe Theismann & Tony Kornheiser
- Gamecenter, Gamebook

Game information

First quarter

- SEA – Deion Branch 22-yard pass from Seneca Wallace (Josh Brown kick), 10:39. Seahawks 7–0. Drive: 7 plays, 68 yards, 2:56.
- SEA – Josh Brown 20-yard field goal, 5:46. Seahawks 10–0. Drive: 8 plays, 37 yards, 3:02.

Second quarter

- SEA – Josh Brown 25-yard field goal, 11:11. Seahawks 13–0. Drive: 12 plays, 72 yards, 5:12.

Third quarter

- No scoring plays.

Fourth quarter

- SEA – Josh Brown 20-yard field goal, 1:17. Seahawks 16–0. Drive: 11 plays, 45 yards, 6:18.

Top passers

- OAK – Andrew Walter: 16/35, 166 yds
- SEA – Seneca Wallace: 18/30, 176 yds, 1 TD

Top rushers

- OAK – LaMont Jordan: 9 car, 63 yds
- SEA – Maurice Morris: 30 car, 138 yds

Top receivers

- OAK – Randy Moss: 6 rec, 76 yds
- SEA – Deion Branch: 4 rec, 61 yds, 1 TD

Team – pass – rush – total – to

- OAK – 121 – 64 – 185 – 0
- SEA – 164 – 207 – 371 – 0

Hoping to rebound from their road loss to the Chiefs, the Seahawks returned home for a Monday night match-up with the Oakland Raiders. The Raiders won the coin toss. It would be the last time fortune smiled on them on a windy and wet night at Qwest Field. In the first quarter, quarterback Seneca Wallace completed a 22-yard touchdown pass to wide receiver Deion Branch. Later in the first quarter, kicker Josh Brown nailed a 20-yard field goal. In the second quarter, Brown would get a 25-yard field goal for the only score of the quarter. After a scoreless third quarter, Brown would put the game away with another 20-yard field goal in the fourth quarter.

While the offense did their job, Seattle's defense had a huge night, sacking Raiders quarterback Andrew Walter nine times, including three consecutive times on the same set of downs.

With their 16–0 victory over the Raiders, and a 42–0 appearance at the Eagles in 2005, dubbed the "Monday Night Massacre" by NFL Films, the Seahawks became the first team to post consecutive shutouts on Monday Night Football. Poetically, the Raiders became the first team to lose in back-to-back MNF shutouts, having lost 27–0 to the San Diego Chargers earlier in 2006.

With the win, the Seahawks improved to 5–3.

==== Week 10: vs. St. Louis Rams ====
Week Ten: Seattle Seahawks vs. St. Louis Rams – Game summary

Quarter	1	2	3	4	Total
Rams	10	3	3	6	22
Seahawks	7	7	0	10	24

at Qwest Field, Seattle

- Date: November 12
- Game time: 1:17pm local
- Game weather: rain, 48 °F (9 °C), 92% humidity, wind SSE 17 miles per hour (27 km/h)
- Game attendance: 68,175
- Referee: Gerry Austin
- TV announcers (Fox): Matt Vasgersian & J.C. Pearson
- Gamecenter, Gamebook

Game information

First quarter

- STL – Victor Adeyanju 89-yard defensive fumble return (Jeff Wilkins kick), 9:11. Rams 7–0.
- SEA – Darrell Jackson 3-yard pass from Seneca Wallace (Josh Brown kick), 5:45. Tied 7–7. Drive: 7 plays, 76 yards, 3:26.
- STL – Jeff Wilkins 40-yard field goal, 0:07. Rams 10–7. Drive: 10 plays, 38 yards, 5:38.

Second quarter

- SEA – Jerramy Stevens 15-yard pass from Seneca Wallace (Josh Brown kick), 7:39. Seahawks 14–10. Drive: 8 plays, 94 yards, 3:20.
- STL – Jeff Wilkins 42-yard field goal, 0:27. Seahawks 14–13. Drive: 13 plays, 57 yards, 7:12.

Third quarter

- STL – Jeff Wilkins 35-yard field goal, 5:41. Rams 16–14. Drive: 7 plays, 33 yards, 2:42.

Fourth quarter

- SEA – Nate Burleson 90-yard punt return (Josh Brown kick), 8:19. Seahawks 21–16.
- STL – Steven Jackson 14-yard run (pass failed), 2:30. Rams 22–21. Drive: 11 plays, 69 yards, 5:49.
- SEA – Josh Brown 38-yard field goal, 0:09. Seahawks 24–22. Drive: 8 plays, 29 yards, 2:21.

Top passers

- STL – Marc Bulger: 26/40, 215 yds, 1 INT
- SEA – Seneca Wallace: 15/23, 161 yds, 2 TD

Top rushers

- STL – Steven Jackson: 18 car, 93 yds, 1 TD
- SEA – Maurice Morris: 21 car, 124 yds

Top receivers

- STL – Torry Holt: 7 rec, 73 yds
- SEA – Darrell Jackson: 5 rec, 85 yds, 1 TD

Team – pass – rush – total – to

- STL – 191 – 108 – 299 – 1
- SEA – 123 – 160 – 283 – 2

On a windy, rainy Sunday the Seahawks hosted the Rams looking to take an effective 3 game lead in the division with a win. The Seahawks drove the ball easily on their first possession, moving to the Rams 1-yard line. After a false start penalty, Seneca Wallace was sacked and fumbled, and the Rams returned the ball 89 yards for a touchdown. The Seahawks drove down the field again, this time maintaining possession to the endzone as Darrell Jackson caught a 3-yard touchdown pass. The lead would change hands 6 more times in the game. With the Rams holding a 16–14 lead in the fourth quarter, Rams head coach Scott Linehan chose to challenge a call, nullifying a field goal. The challenge was upheld, but the Rams still faced a fourth down play. Instead of kicking another field goal to increase the lead, Linehan chose to go for a first down. The raucous Qwest Field rose to the occasion, and Rams fullback Paul Smith could not hear the play call. Rather than run a pass route he stayed in the backfield to block, and Rams quarterback Marc Bulger's pass to double covered tight end Klopfenstein fell incomplete.

Nate Burleson returned a punt 90 yards for a touchdown and a 21–16 lead. After a Rams touchdown with 2:37 remaining, a series of penalties against St. Louis changed momentum. A holding penalty nullified a successful 2 point conversion. The second attempt failed. A 15-yard personal foul was assessed on the subsequent kickoff, and Josh Scobey returned the ball to the Rams 49-yard line. With a short field and time on the clock, Seneca Wallace and Maurice Morris drove the Seahawks to the Rams 20-yard line, where Josh Brown kicked a game-winning field goal with 9 seconds remaining.

Brown kicked game-winning field goals in both games against the Rams that year.

With their 4th straight win over the Rams, the Seahawks improved to 6–3.

==== Week 11: at San Francisco 49ers ====
Week Eleven: Seattle Seahawks at San Francisco 49ers – Game summary

Quarter	1	2	3	4	Total
Seahawks	0	0	7	7	14
49ers	3	17	0	0	20

at Monster Park, San Francisco

- Date: November 19
- Game time: 1:05pm local
- Game weather: hazy, 59 °F (15 °C), 88% humidity, wind NE 5 miles per hour (8.0 km/h)
- Game attendance: 68,367
- Referee: Larry Nemmers
- TV announcers (Fox): Matt Vasgersian & J.C. Pearson
- Gamecenter, Gamebook

Game information

First quarter

- SF – Joe Nedney 39-yard field goal, 4:15. 49ers 3–0. Drive: 6 plays, 71 yards, 2:47.

Second quarter

- SF – Arnaz Battle 9-yard pass from Alex Smith (Joe Nedney kick), 10:11. 49ers 10–0. Drive: 5 plays, 40 yards, 2:42.
- SF – Alex Smith 1-yard run (Joe Nedney kick), 4:14. 49ers 17–0. Drive: 5 plays, 74 yards, 3:12.
- SF – Joe Nedney 18-yard field goal, 0:00. 49ers 20–0. Drive: 8 plays, 30 yards, 3:55.

Third quarter

- SEA – Deion Branch 38-yard pass from Seneca Wallace (Josh Brown kick), 12:46. 49ers 20–7. Drive: 5 plays, 68 yards, 2:14.

Fourth quarter

- SEA – Darrell Jackson 41-yard pass from Seneca Wallace (Josh Brown kick), 6:40. 49ers 20–14. Drive: 4 plays, 80 yards, 1:45.

Top passers

- SEA – Seneca Wallace: 19/31, 252 yds, 2 TD, 3 INT
- SF – Alex Smith: 19/25, 163 yds, 1 TD

Top rushers

- SEA – Shaun Alexander: 17 car, 37 yds
- SF – Frank Gore: 24 car, 212 yds

Top receivers

- SEA – Deion Branch: 7 rec, 113 yds, 1 TD
- SF – Eric Johnson: 4 rec, 48 yds

Team – pass – rush – total – to

- SEA – 233 – 70 – 303 – 5
- SF – 154 – 262 – 416 – 1

The Seahawks travelled to Monster Park to face division rival San Francisco. Buoyed by the return of Shaun Alexander to the starting line-up, and having Matt Hasselbeck dressed as the 3rd quarterback, the Seahawks expected to take a stranglehold on the NFC West. Instead, they played a flat first half and fell behind by 20 points – 13 of those coming after 3 turnovers. The Seahawks also allowed the 49ers to gain 163 rushing yards in the first half, whereas Alexander had only 9 yards on 7 carries. He would finish with 37 yards on 17 carries.

A different Hawks team appeared in the second half, scoring quickly on a 38-yard touchdown reception by Deion Branch. The Seahawks added another long touchdown reception by Darrell Jackson with 6:40 remaining in the game, but could not get any closer. A key sequence in the last 2 minutes of the game saw Alexander stopped for a loss on 4th and 1. Following the change of possession, 49ers running back Frank Gore fumbled, recovered by Grant Wistrom. Given a second life, the Seahawks allowed a 9-yard loss on a sack before Seneca Wallace threw an interception. Instead of owning a 3-game lead in the division, the Seahawks only lead the surprising 49ers by a game. The teams would meet again on December 14 at Qwest Field.

With the loss, the Seahawks fell to 6–4.

==== Week 12: vs. Green Bay Packers ====
Week Twelve: Seattle Seahawks vs. Green Bay Packers – Game summary

Quarter	1	2	3	4	Total
Packers	7	7	7	3	24
Seahawks	3	9	7	15	34

at Qwest Field, Seattle

- Date: November 27
- Game time: 5:30pm local
- Game weather: 34 °F (1 °C), 84% humidity, wind 14 miles per hour (23 km/h)
- Game attendance: 68,256
- Referee: Tony Corrente
- TV announcers (ESPN): Mike Tirico, Joe Theismann & Tony Kornheiser
- Gamecenter, Gamebook

Game information

First quarter

- GB – Ahman Green 5-yard run (Dave Rayner kick), 12:42. Packers 7–0. Drive: 4 plays, 36 yards, 1:30.
- SEA – Josh Brown 45-yard field goal, 3:35. Packers 7–3. Drive: 11 plays, 45 yards, 5:04.

Second quarter

- SEA – Josh Brown 41-yard field goal, 8:36. Packers 7–6. Drive: 9 plays, 57 yards, 3:55.
- SEA – Josh Brown 37-yard field goal, 3:34. Seahawks 9–7. Drive: 9 plays, 25 yards, 3:21.
- GB – Abdul Hodge 29-yard defensive fumble return (Dave Rayner kick), 1:51. Packers 14–9.
- SEA – Josh Brown 28-yard field goal, 0:23. Packers 14–12. Drive: 8 plays, 40 yards, 1:28.

Third quarter

- GB – Donald Driver 48-yard pass from Brett Favre (Dave Rayner kick), 12:39. Packers 21–12. Drive: 5 plays, 72 yards, 2:21.
- SEA – D. J. Hackett 23-yard pass from Matt Hasselbeck (Josh Brown kick), 6:19. Packers 21–19. Drive: 9 plays, 62 yards, 3:33.

Fourth quarter

- SEA – Darrell Jackson 4-yard pass from Matt Hasselbeck (Jerramy Stevens pass from Matt Hasselbeck), 14:11. Seahawks 27–21. Drive: 10 plays, 77 yards, 5:26.
- GB – Dave Rayner 34-yard field goal, 10:50. Seahawks 27–24. Drive: 7 plays, 43 yards, 3:21.
- SEA – Jerramy Stevens 3-yard pass from Matt Hasselbeck (Josh Brown kick), 6:13. Seahawks 34–24. Drive: 11 plays, 51 yards, 4:37.

Top passers

- GB – Brett Favre: 22/36, 266 yds, 1 TD, 3 INT
- SEA – Matt Hasselbeck: 17/36, 157 yds, 3 TD, 3 INT

Top rushers

- GB – Ahman Green: 14 car, 44 yds, 1 TD
- SEA – Shaun Alexander: 40 car, 201 yds

Top receivers

- GB – Donald Driver: 3 rec, 89 yds, 1 TD
- SEA – D. J. Hackett: 5 rec, 67 yds, 1 TD

Team – pass – rush – total – to

- GB – 265 – 51 – 316 – 4
- SEA – 147 – 235 – 382 – 4

Snow fell on a Seahawks home game for the first time ever. In a setting that looked more like Green Bay's home field, the Seahawks started poorly on Monday Night Football. Matt Hasselbeck returned after missing 4 games and promptly turned the ball over four times in the first half. Shaun Alexander picked up the slack for the rusty Hasselbeck, rushing a team record 40 times for 201 yards on the evening. It was a return to MVP form for Alexander, who was still running on a cracked foot injured in the first week of the season.

Josh Brown kicked four field goals in the first half to keep Seattle in the game, and they trailed only 14–12 at the half. All of Green Bay's points came off turnovers, the last 7 when a Hasselbeck fumble was returned for a touchdown. The snow stopped falling at halftime.

Green Bay drove for a touchdown on their first possession of the second half to go up 21–12. After both teams had drives stall and were forced to punt, Hasselbeck led the Seahawks on a nine-play, 62-yard drive capped by a 23-yard pass to D. J. Hackett. Seattle drove again late in the third quarter, led by Alexander. On the second play of the fourth quarter, Hasselbeck found Darrell Jackson for a 4-yard touchdown toss. A 2-point conversion gave the Seahawks a 27–21 lead. After a Green Bay field goal cut the Seahawks lead to 3 points, Hasselbeck threw his third touchdown to Jerramy Stevens to cap an 11-play, 51-yard drive. The Seahawks defense crushed the final three Green Bay drives with two interceptions and a fumble recovery to finish with 4 takeaways on the night.

With the win, the Seahawks improved to 7–4.

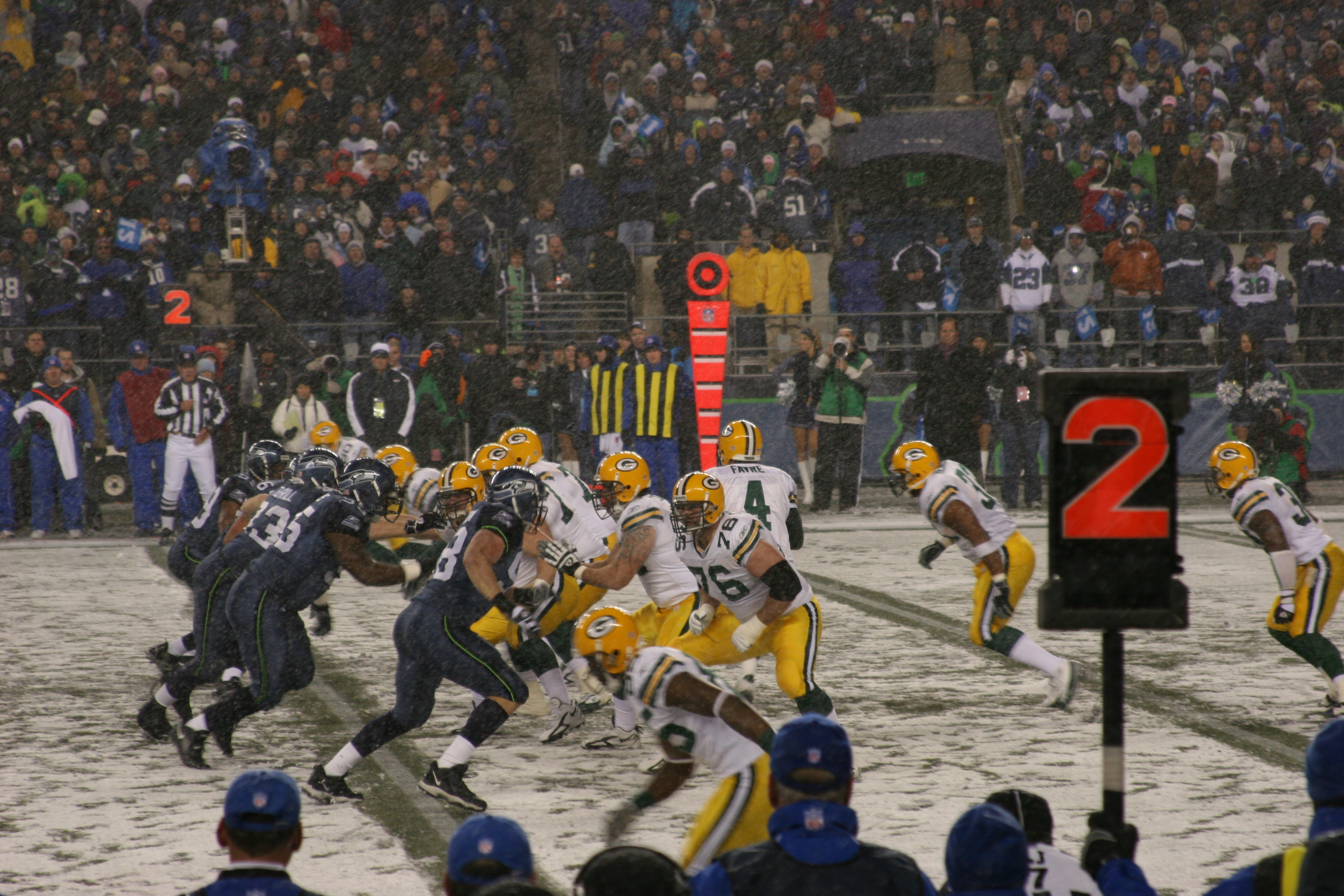
Packers on offense

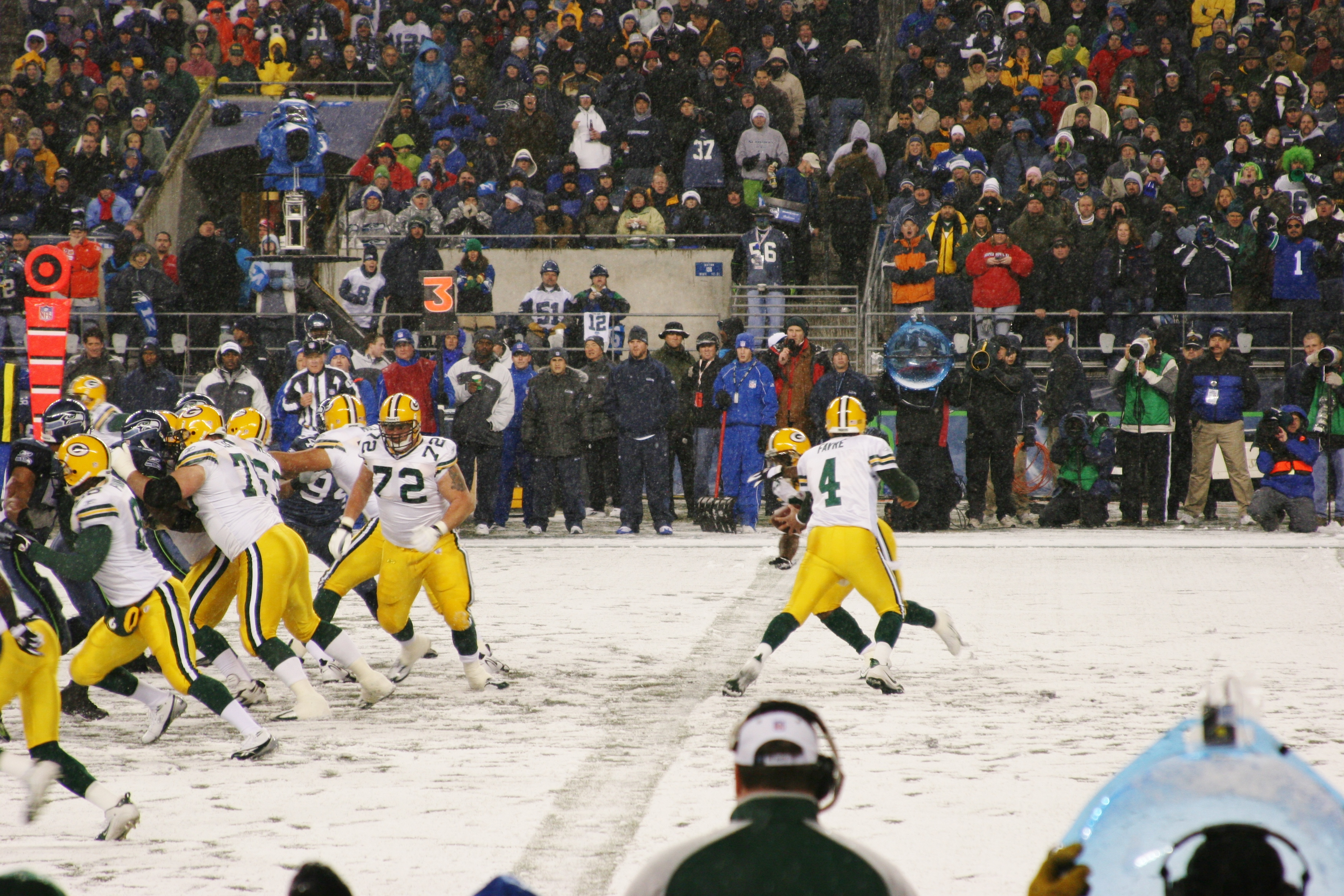
Favre hands off the ball to a running back

==== Week 13: at Denver Broncos ====
Week Thirteen: Seattle Seahawks at Denver Broncos – Game summary

Quarter	1	2	3	4	Total
Seahawks	0	7	0	16	23
Broncos	3	10	0	7	20

at Invesco Field at Mile High, Denver

- Date: December 3
- Game time: 6:20pm local
- Game weather: clear, 16 °F (−9 °C), 71% humidity, wind 10 miles per hour (16 km/h)
- Game attendance: 76,146
- Referee: Scott Green
- TV announcers (NBC): Al Michaels & John Madden
- Gamecenter, Gamebook

Game information

First quarter

- DEN – Jason Elam 37-yard field goal, 3:58. Broncos 3–0. Drive: 6 plays, 31 yards, 3:31.

Second quarter

- DEN – Stephen Alexander 7-yard pass from Jay Cutler (Jason Elam kick), 6:14. Broncos 10–0. Drive: 8 plays, 70 yards, 3:22.
- SEA – Darryl Tapp 25-yard interception return (Josh Brown kick), 5:00. Broncos 10–7.
- DEN – Jason Elam 41-yard field goal, 0:00. Broncos 13–7. Drive: 7 plays, 24 yards, 1:47.

Third quarter

- No scoring plays.

Fourth quarter

- SEA – Shaun Alexander 1-yard run (Josh Brown kick), 8:13. Seahawks 14–13. Drive: 3 plays, 61 yards, 1:29.
- SEA – Josh Brown 44-yard field goal, 4:08. Seahawks 17–13. Drive: 6 plays, 14 yards, 3:56.
- SEA – Josh Brown 23-yard field goal, 2:58. Seahawks 20–13. Drive: 4 plays, 9 yards, 0:57.
- DEN – Brandon Marshall 71-yard pass from Jay Cutler (Jason Elam kick), 2:37. Tied 20–20. Drive: 1 play, 71 yards, 0:21.
- SEA – Josh Brown 50-yard field goal, 0:05. Seahawks 23–20. Drive: 10 plays, 54 yards, 2:32.

Top passers

- SEA – Matt Hasselbeck: 16/28, 168 yds, 1 INT
- DEN – Jay Cutler: 10/21, 143 yds, 2 TD, 2 INT

Top rushers

- SEA – Shaun Alexander: 26 car, 90 yds, 1 TD
- DEN – Tatum Bell: 23 car, 133 yds

Top receivers

- SEA – Darrell Jackson: 6 rec, 91 yds
- DEN – Brandon Marshall: 1 rec, 71 yds, 1 TD

Team – pass – rush – total – to

- SEA – 162 – 108 – 270 – 1
- DEN – 121 – 181 – 302 – 5

The Seahawks travelled to Denver to face their old foe from the AFC West. On a frigid Sunday Night game, these Seahawks were able to accomplish what few of their predecessors managed – to come out of Denver with a win. Carrying on their recent troubling tendency of weak first half performances, the Seahawks fell behind 13–7 to the Broncos, who were led by first-time starter Jay Cutler. The Seahawks managed only 2 first downs and 67 yards of total offense in the first half, but remained in the game thanks to Darryl Tapp's 25-yard return of an intercepted Cutler pass for a touchdown.

In the second half, the teams traded punts and one turnover apiece until Seattle got the ball on its own 39-yard line with 9:42 left in the game. Two long pass completions from Matt Hasselbeck to Darrell Jackson put the Seahawks on the Broncos one-yard line. Shaun Alexander quickly took the ball into the endzone for a 14–13 Seahawks lead. The Broncos fumbled the ensuing kickoff, and Joe Tafoya recovered. Assisted by a holding penalty on third down, the Seahawks moved the ball into range for Josh Brown to kick a 44-yard field goal. The Broncos held onto the following kickoff, but on their first play Cutler threw an interception to Jordan Babineaux for Seattle's 9th takeaway in the past two games. The Seahawks again had to settle for a Brown 23-yard field goal for a 20–13 lead with 3:01 remaining, keeping Denver in the game. The failure to score a touchdown proved costly, as Cutler connected with wide receiver Brandon Marshall on a 71-yard pass and run play for a game tying touchdown, assisted by some poor tackling by Seattle.

The Seahawks started the last drive at their own 14-yard line with 2:31 remaining. A key third down reception by Nate Burleson kept the drive alive, and Hasselbeck led the team down to the Broncos 32-yard line with 10 seconds remaining. Josh Brown came on to kick a game-winning, 50-yard field goal, his fourth such kick of the season to tie an NFL record.

With the win the Seahawks' lead in the NFC West increased to three games over the 49ers and Rams as they improved to 8–4.

==== Week 14: at Arizona Cardinals ====
Week Fourteen: Seattle Seahawks at Arizona Cardinals – Game summary

Quarter	1	2	3	4	Total
Seahawks	7	7	7	0	21
Cardinals	14	3	0	10	27

at University of Phoenix Stadium, Glendale, Arizona

- Date: December 10
- Game time: 2:05pm local
- Game weather: indoors
- Game attendance: 63,603
- Referee: Gene Steratore
- TV announcers (Fox): Thom Brennaman & Charles Davis
- Gamecenter, Gamebook

Game information

First quarter

- ARI – Bryant Johnson 56-yard pass from Matt Leinart (Neil Rackers kick), 12:45. Cardinals 7–0. Drive: 1 play, 56 yards, 0:09.
- ARI – Edgerrin James 7-yard run (Neil Rackers kick), 3:27. Cardinals 14–0. Drive: 4 plays, 24 yards, 1:58.
- SEA – D. J. Hackett 23-yard pass from Matt Hasselbeck (Josh Brown kick), 2:37. Cardinals 14–7. Drive: 2 plays, 70 yards, 0:50.

Second quarter

- ARI – Neil Rackers 32-yard field goal, 3:14. Cardinals 17–7. Drive: 11 plays, 60 yards, 6:41.
- SEA – Nate Burleson 5-yard pass from Matt Hasselbeck (Josh Brown kick), 0:30. Cardinals 17–14. Drive: 8 plays, 91 yards, 2:44.

Third quarter

- SEA – Darrell Jackson 2-yard pass from Matt Hasselbeck (Josh Brown kick), 5:05. Seahawks 21–17. Drive: 11 plays, 57 yards, 5:24.

Fourth quarter

- ARI – Larry Fitzgerald 5-yard pass from Matt Leinart (Neil Rackers kick), 14:56. Cardinals 24–21. Drive: 7 plays, 36 yards, 3:28.
- ARI – Neil Rackers 40-yard field goal, 3:30. Cardinals 27–21. Drive: 6 plays, 18 yards, 3:33.

Top passers

- SEA – Matt Hasselbeck: 20/28, 243 yds, 3 TD
- ARI – Matt Leinart: 21/34, 232 yds, 2 TD, 1 INT

Top rushers

- SEA – Shaun Alexander: 22 car, 76 yds
- ARI – Edgerrin James: 26 car, 115 yds, 1 TD

Top receivers

- SEA – D. J. Hackett: 4 rec, 104 yds, 1 TD
- ARI – Bryant Johnson: 3 rec, 81 yds, 1 TD

Team – pass – rush – total – to

- SEA – 228 – 120 – 348 – 3
- ARI – 232 – 113 – 345 – 1

Coming off their Sunday night victory over the Broncos, the Seahawks flew to the University of Phoenix Stadium for an NFC West rematch with the Arizona Cardinals. In the first quarter, Seattle trailed early as Cardinals quarterback Matt Leinart completed a 56-yard touchdown pass to wide receiver Bryant Johnson, while running back Edgerrin James got a 7-yard touchdown run. The Seahawks would respond with quarterback Matt Hasselbeck completing a 23-yard touchdown pass to wide receiver D. J. Hackett. In the second quarter, Arizona increased its lead with kicker Neil Rackers nailing a 32-yard field goal. Seattle would draw closer with Hasselbeck completing a 5-yard touchdown pass to wide receiver Nate Burleson. In the third quarter, the Seahawks took the lead with Hasselbeck's 2-yard touchdown pass to wide receiver Darrell Jackson for the only score of the period. However, in the fourth quarter, the Cardinals got the win with Leinart's 5-yard touchdown pass to wide receiver Larry Fitzgerald and Rackers' 40-yard field goal. With the loss, Seattle fell to 8–5.

==== Week 15: vs. San Francisco 49ers ====
Week Fifteen: Seattle Seahawks vs. San Francisco 49ers – Game summary

Quarter	1	2	3	4	Total
49ers	0	3	0	21	24
Seahawks	7	0	0	7	14

at Qwest Field, Seattle

- Date: December 14
- Game time: 5:13pm local
- Game weather: rain, 52 °F (11 °C), 95% humidity, wind SSE 20 miles per hour (32 km/h)
- Game attendance: 67,650
- Referee: Pete Morelli
- TV announcers (NFL Network): Bryant Gumbel & Cris Collinsworth
- Gamecenter, Gamebook

Game information

First quarter

- SEA – Shaun Alexander 3-yard run (Josh Brown kick), 2:18. Seahawks 7–0. Drive: 5 plays, 44 yards, 2:09.

Second quarter

- SF – Joe Nedney 39-yard field goal, 0:03. Seahawks 7–3. Drive: 12 plays, 59 yards, 4:30.

Third quarter

- No scoring plays.

Fourth quarter

- SF – Vernon Davis 8-yard pass from Alex Smith (Joe Nedney kick), 11:24. 49ers 10–7. Drive: 11 plays, 90 yards, 5:26.
- SF – Frank Gore 20-yard pass from Alex Smith (Joe Nedney kick), 4:01. 49ers 17–7. Drive: 10 plays, 73 yards, 5:36.
- SF – Alex Smith 18-yard run (Joe Nedney kick), 1:42. 49ers 24–7. Drive: 6 plays, 86 yards, 1:45.
- SEA – Jerramy Stevens 22-yard pass from Matt Hasselbeck (Josh Brown kick), 0:09. 49ers 24–14. Drive: 5 plays, 51 yards, 1:33.

Top passers

- SF – Alex Smith: 14/25, 162 yds, 2 TD
- SEA – Matt Hasselbeck: 20/37, 220 yds, 1 TD, 2 INT

Top rushers

- SF – Frank Gore: 29 car, 144 yds
- SEA – Shaun Alexander: 23 car, 73 yds, 1 TD

Top receivers

- SF – Arnaz Battle: 5 rec, 97 yds
- SEA – D. J. Hackett: 8 rec, 87 yds

Team – pass – rush – total – to

- SF – 162 – 228 – 390 – 0
- SEA – 210 – 90 – 300 – 2

Despite the loss to the Cardinals, the Seahawks could still clinch the NFC West at home in a Thursday night game against the San Francisco 49ers with the Seahawks hoping to avenge the earlier loss to the 49ers. On a rainy, windy night, Seattle started off strong with running back Shaun Alexander getting a three-yard touchdown run for the only score of the first quarter. The 49ers offense was almost nonexistent in the first half, as seven of San Francisco's first eight drives ended in three-and-outs. However, the Seahawks still allowed a 39-yard field goal by 49ers kicker Joe Nedney near the end of the half.

After a scoreless third quarter, Seattle's defense started giving way. 49ers quarterback Alex Smith completed an 8-yard touchdown pass to tight end Vernon Davis. An unsportsmanlike conduct penalty on Davis combined with an excellent kickoff return by Nate Burleson gave Seattle prime field position at the San Francisco 33-yard line. However, the Seahawks failed to convert on a fourth down play on the first series from scrimmage, and turned the ball over on downs. Smith would take advantage by driving his team downfield and completing a 20-yard touchdown pass to running back Frank Gore. San Francisco delivered the final blow with Smith running for an 18-yard touchdown on a naked bootleg with no defenders near him. The Seahawks got a 22-yard touchdown from quarterback Matt Hasselbeck to tight end Jerramy Stevens with under two minutes left, but it wouldn't be enough as Seattle would get swept by the 49ers. With the loss, the Seahawks fell to 8–6.

==== Week 16: vs. San Diego Chargers ====
Week Sixteen: Seattle Seahawks vs. San Diego Chargers – Game summary

Quarter	1	2	3	4	Total
Chargers	0	7	6	7	20
Seahawks	0	0	7	10	17

at Qwest Field, Seattle

- Date: December 24
- Game time: 1:16pm local
- Game weather: rain, 47 °F (8 °C), 55% humidity, wind SE 18 miles per hour (29 km/h)
- Game attendance: 68,174
- Referee: Ron Winter
- TV announcers (CBS): Dick Enberg & Randy Cross
- Gamecenter, Gamebook

Game information

First quarter

- No scoring plays.

Second quarter

- SD – Vincent Jackson 9-yard pass from Philip Rivers (Nate Kaeding kick), 3:18. Chargers 7–0. Drive: 6 plays, 86 yards, 2:56.

Third quarter

- SD – Nate Kaeding 46-yard field goal, 12:12. Chargers 10–0. Drive: 8 plays, 45 yards, 2:48.
- SEA – Shaun Alexander 33-yard run (Josh Brown kick), 6:10. Chargers 10–7. Drive: 6 plays, 52 yards, 1:56.
- SD – Nate Kaeding 40-yard field goal, 2:24. Chargers 13–7. Drive: 9 plays, 61 yards, 3:46.

Fourth quarter

- SEA – Shaun Alexander 9-yard run (Josh Brown kick), 12:58. Seahawks 14–13. Drive: 5 plays, 45 yards, 1:55.
- SEA – Josh Brown 33-yard field goal, 5:07. Seahawks 17–13. Drive: 12 plays, 47 yards, 6:09.
- SD – Vincent Jackson 37-yard pass from Philip Rivers (Nate Kaeding kick), 0:29. Chargers 20–17. Drive: 5 plays, 59 yards, 1:31.

Top passers

- SD – Philip Rivers: 10/30, 181 yds, 2 TD
- SEA – Matt Hasselbeck: 17/37, 189 yds, 2 INT

Top rushers

- SD – LaDainian Tomlinson: 22 car, 123 yds
- SEA – Shaun Alexander: 31 car, 140 yds, 2 TD

Top receivers

- SD – Vincent Jackson: 5 rec, 97 yds, 2 TD
- SEA – Bobby Engram: 4 rec, 65 yds

Team – pass – rush – total – to

- SD – 172 – 168 – 340 – 0
- SEA – 161 – 153 – 314 – 2

Trying to end a two-game skid, the Seahawks went home for a Week 16 fight with the San Diego Chargers. After a scoreless first quarter, the Chargers struck in the second quarter with quarterback Philip Rivers completing a 9-yard touchdown pass to wide receiver Vincent Jackson for the only score of the period. In the third quarter, San Diego increased its lead with kicker Nate Kaeding nailing a 46-yard field goal. Fortunately, Seattle started to strike back with running back Shaun Alexander getting a 33-yard touchdown run. However, the Chargers answered back with Kaeding kicking a 40-yard field goal. In the fourth quarter, the Seahawks finally took the lead with Alexander getting a 9-yard touchdown run, along with kicker Josh Brown's 33-yard field goal. However, the Chargers wrapped up the game with Rivers and Jackson hooking up again on a 37-yard touchdown pass. With the loss, Seattle fell to 8–7.

==== Week 17: at Tampa Bay Buccaneers ====
Week Seventeen: Seattle Seahawks at Tampa Bay Buccaneers – Game summary

Quarter	1	2	3	4	Total
Seahawks	10	7	3	3	23
Buccaneers	0	7	0	0	7

at Raymond James Stadium, Tampa, Florida

- Date: December 31
- Game time: 1:03pm local
- Game weather: partly cloudy, 78 °F (26 °C), 71% humidity, wind SSE 15 miles per hour (24 km/h)
- Game attendance: 65,660
- Referee: Jerome Boger
- TV announcers (Fox): Matt Vasgersian & J.C. Pearson
- Gamecenter, Gamebook

Game information

First quarter

- SEA – Josh Brown 35-yard field goal, 9:58. Seahawks 3–0. Drive: 8 plays, 44 yards, 3:08.
- SEA – Shaun Alexander 1-yard run (Josh Brown kick), 2:53. Seahawks 10–0. Drive: 10 plays, 66 yards, 4:34.

Second quarter

- TB – Joey Galloway 4-yard pass from Tim Rattay (Matt Bryant kick), 14:14. Seahawks 10–7. Drive: 8 plays, 80 yards, 3:39.
- SEA – D. J. Hackett 5-yard pass from Matt Hasselbeck (Josh Brown kick), 0:19. Seahawks 17–7. Drive: 10 plays, 70 yards, 4:18.

Third quarter

- SEA – Josh Brown 30-yard field goal, 10:14. Seahawks 20–7. Drive: 4 plays, −2 yards, 1:18.

Fourth quarter

- SEA – Josh Brown 23-yard field goal, 14:49. Seahawks 23–7. Drive: 14 plays, 65 yards, 8:12.

Top passers

- SEA – Matt Hasselbeck: 17/29, 216 yds, 1 TD
- TB – Tim Rattay: 16/27, 185 yds, 1 TD

Top rushers

- SEA – Shaun Alexander: 28 car, 92 yds, 1 TD
- TB – Michael Pittman: 12 car, 73 yds

Top receivers

- SEA – D. J. Hackett: 4 rec, 63 yds, 1 TD
- TB – Joey Galloway: 8 rec, 118 yds, 1 TD

Team – pass – rush – total – to

- SEA – 212 – 132 – 344 – 1
- TB – 177 – 110 – 287 – 2

Trying the end a three-game skid, the Seahawks flew to Raymond James Stadium for their last game of the regular season against the Tampa Bay Buccaneers. In the first quarter, Seattle drew first blood with kicker Josh Brown nailing a 35-yard field goal, while running back Shaun Alexander got a 1-yard touchdown run. In the second quarter, the Buccaneers would get their only score of the game as quarterback Tim Rattay completed a 4-yard touchdown pass to wide receiver Joey Galloway. Afterwards, Seattle took over for the rest of the game as quarterback Matt Hasselbeck completed a 5-yard touchdown pass to wide receiver D. J. Hackett. In the second half, Brown wrapped up the game with a 30-yard field goal in the third goal, along with a 23-yard field goal in the fourth quarter. With the win, the Seahawks wrapped up the regular season at 9–7 and acquired the NFC's #4 seed.

However, cornerbacks Kelly Jennings, and Jimmy Williams were injured during the match. They would join Kelly Herndon and Marcus Trufant on the injured list.

=== Postseason ===
Seattle entered the postseason as the #4 seed in the NFC.

==== NFC Wild Card Playoff: vs. #5 Dallas Cowboys ====
NFC Wild Card Playoff: #5 Dallas Cowboys at #4 Seattle Seahawks – Game summary

Quarter	1	2	3	4	Total
Cowboys	3	7	7	3	20
Seahawks	3	3	7	8	21

at Qwest Field, Seattle

- Date: January 6
- Game time: 5:09pm local
- Game weather: overcast, 44 °F (7 °C), 73% humidity, wind SSW 15 miles per hour (24 km/h)
- Game attendance: 68,058
- Referee: Walt Anderson
- TV announcers (NBC): Al Michaels, John Madden & Andrea Kremer
- Gamecenter, Gamebook

Game information

First quarter

- SEA – Josh Brown 23-yard field goal, 11:13. Seahawks 3–0. Drive: 9 plays, 55 yards, 3:47.
- DAL – Martin Gramatica 50-yard field goal, 4:50. Tied 3–3. Drive: 5 plays, 11 yards, 2:21.

Second quarter

- SEA – Josh Brown 30-yard field goal, 8:23. Seahawks 6–3. Drive: 13 plays, 54 yards, 5:14.
- DAL – Patrick Crayton 13-yard pass from Tony Romo (Martin Gramatica kick), 0:11. Cowboys 10–6. Drive: 10 plays, 76 yards, 5:03.

Third quarter

- SEA – Jerramy Stevens 15-yard pass from Matt Hasselbeck (Josh Brown kick), 6:08. Seahawks 13–10. Drive: 12 plays, 62 yards, 6:45.
- DAL – Miles Austin 93-yard kickoff return (Martin Gramatica kick), 5:57. Cowboys 17–13. Drive: 0 plays, 0 yards, 0:11.

Fourth quarter

- DAL – Martin Gramatica 29-yard field goal, 10:15. Cowboys 20–13. Drive: 8 plays, 46 yards, 4:26.
- SEA – Safety, Terry Glenn fumble out of end zone, 6:32. Cowboys 20–15.
- SEA –Jerramy Stevens 37-yard pass from Matt Hasselbeck (pass failed), 4:24. Seahawks 21–20. Drive: 4 plays, 50 yards, 2:08.

Top passers

- DAL – Tony Romo: 17/29, 189 yds, 1 TD
- SEA – Matt Hasselbeck: 18/36, 240 yds, 2 TD, 2 INT

Top rushers

- DAL – Julius Jones: 22 car, 112 yds
- SEA – Shaun Alexander: 24 car, 69 yds

Top receivers

- DAL – Jason Witten: 3 rec, 57 yds
- SEA – Bobby Engram: 4 rec, 88 yds

Team – pass – rush – total – to

- DAL – 168 – 116 – 284 – 1
- SEA – 240 – 92 – 332 – 2

Entering the NFC playoffs as the fourth-seed, the Seahawks began their playoff run at home against the fifth-seeded Dallas Cowboys. In the first quarter, Seattle struck first blood with a 23-yard field goal, while Cowboys kicker Martín Gramática nailed a 50-yard field goal. In the second quarter, Seattle went back into the lead with Brown kicking a 30-yard field goal. However, Dallas took the lead with quarterback Tony Romo completing a 13-yard touchdown pass to wide receiver Patrick Crayton before halftime. In the third quarter, the Seahawks regained the lead with quarterback Matt Hasselbeck completing a 15-yard touchdown pass to tight end Jerramy Stevens. However, following the touchdown drive, the Cowboys marched right back into the lead as wide receiver Miles Austin returned a kickoff 93 yards for a touchdown. In the fourth quarter, Dallas increased its lead with Gramática kicking a 29-yard field goal. Later, Seattle retook the lead with a safety off a Terry Glenn fumble from a hit by rookie cornerback Kelly Jennings, along with Hasselbeck hooking up with Stevens again on a 37-yard touchdown pass (followed up with a failed a two-point conversion). Afterwards, the Cowboys got into position to score late in the game, but Romo botched the hold of a field-goal attempt. He then ran to try for the first down or the touchdown, but was tackled by strong safety Jordan Babineaux. The Seahawks then ran out as much of the clock as they could. With two seconds left, Dallas had one final shot as Romo threw up a Hail Mary pass, but Seattle batted the ball down for the win.

With the victory, the Seahawks improved their overall record to 10–7 and advanced to the Divisional Round to take on the Chicago Bears. They also became the first team to win a playoff game after losing the Super Bowl since the 1997 Patriots.

In the words of the Seattle Times, the Seahawks won "a wild wild-card game."

==== NFC Divisional Playoff: at #1 Chicago Bears ====
NFC Divisional Playoff: #4 Seattle Seahawks at #1 Chicago Bears – Game summary

Quarter	1	2	3	4	OT	Total
Seahawks	0	14	10	0	0	24
Bears	7	14	0	3	3	27

at Soldier Field, Chicago, Illinois

- Date: January 14
- Game time: 12:06pm local
- Game weather: cloudy, 32 °F (0 °C), 65% humidity, wind N 8 miles per hour (13 km/h)
- Game attendance: 62,184
- Referee: Gerry Austin
- TV announcers (Fox): Joe Buck & Troy Aikman
- Gamecenter, Gamebook

Game information

First quarter

- CHI – Thomas Jones 9-yard run (Robbie Gould kick), 8:35. Bears 7–0. Drive: 12 plays, 80 yards, 6:25.

Second quarter

- SEA – Nate Burleson 16-yard pass from Matt Hasselbeck (Josh Brown kick), 14:54. Tied 7–7. Drive: 9 plays, 71 yards, 3:54.
- CHI – Bernard Berrian 68-yard pass from Rex Grossman (Robbie Gould kick), 14:36. Bears 14–7. Drive: 1 play, 68 yards, 0:18.
- SEA – Shaun Alexander 4-yard run (Josh Brown kick), 2:29. Tied 14–14. Drive: 5 plays, 26 yards, 1:50.
- CHI – Thomas Jones 7-yard run (Robbie Gould kick), 0:48. Bears 21–14. Drive: 7 plays, 57 yards, 1:41.

Third quarter

- SEA – Josh Brown 40-yard field goal, 9:56. Bears 21–17. Drive: 6 plays, 49 yards, 5:04.
- SEA – Shaun Alexander 13-yard run (Josh Brown kick), 4:57. Seahawks 24–21. Drive: 7 plays, 51 yards, 2:21.

Fourth quarter

- CHI – Robbie Gould 41-yard field goal, 4:24. Tied 24–24. Drive: 12 plays, 48 yards, 5:51.

Overtime

- CHI – Robbie Gould 49-yard field goal, 10:02. Bears 27–24. Drive: 7 plays, 34 yards, 2:49.

Top passers

- SEA – Matt Hasselbeck: 18/33, 195 yds, 1 TD, 1 INT
- CHI – Rex Grossman: 21/38, 282 yds, 1 TD, 1 INT

Top rushers

- SEA – Shaun Alexander: 26 car, 108 yds, 2 TD
- CHI – Thomas Jones: 21 car, 66 yds, 2 TD

Top receivers

- SEA – Darrell Jackson: 4 rec, 49 yds
- CHI – Bernard Berrian: 5 rec, 105 yds, 1 TD

Team – pass – rush – total – to

- SEA – 179 – 127 – 306 – 1
- CHI – 251 – 120 – 371 – 2

Coming off the win over the Cowboys, the Seahawks traveled to Soldier Field to face the top-seeded Chicago Bears in the Divisional round. In the first quarter, Seattle trailed early with Bears running back Thomas Jones getting a 9-yard touchdown run for the only score of the quarter. In the second quarter, the Seahawks got on the board with quarterback Matt Hasselbeck completing a 16-yard touchdown pass to wide receiver Nate Burleson. However, immediately following Seattle's score, Chicago responded with quarterback Rex Grossman completing a 68-yard touchdown pass to wide receiver Bernard Berrian. The Seahawks struck back with running back Shaun Alexander getting a 4-yard touchdown run, yet Jones helped the Bears out with a 7-yard touchdown run. In the third quarter, Seattle took the lead with kicker Josh Brown kicking a 40-yard field goal, while Alexander got a 13-yard touchdown run. However, in the fourth quarter, Chicago tied the game with kicker Robbie Gould getting a 41-yard field goal. In overtime, the Seahawks won the coin toss and received the ball first. Hasselbeck led the team to around midfield, but on their last third down of the game, he threw the ball out of bounds. On fourth down the Seahawks punted to the Bears who were able to get the ball close enough for Gould to kick a 49-yard field goal.

With the loss, Seattle ended its season with an overall record of 10–8.
