= Pat Ross =

Pat Ross is the name of:

- Pat Ross (businessman) (born 1960), CEO of Steeplejack Industrial
- Pat Ross (American football) (born 1983), American football player

== See also ==
- Patrick Ross, football coach
