= Kelly Jennings =

American football player (born 1982)

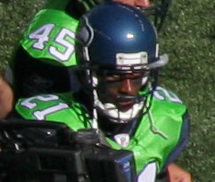
- Jennings with the Seattle Seahawks in 2009

No. 21, 23
- Position: Cornerback

Personal information
- Born: November 30, 1982 (age 43); Live Oak, Florida, U.S.
- Listed height: 5 ft 11 in (1.80 m)
- Listed weight: 180 lb (82 kg)

Career information
- High school: Suwannee (Live Oak)
- College: Miami (FL) (2001–2005)
- NFL draft: 2006: 1st round, 31st overall pick

Career history
- Seattle Seahawks (2006–2010); Cincinnati Bengals (2011)

Awards and highlights
- BCS national champion (2001); Second-team All-American (2005); First-team All-ACC (2005)

Career NFL statistics
- Total tackles: 243
- Sacks: 1
- Forced fumbles: 1
- Fumble recoveries: 2
- Interceptions: 2
- Stats at Pro Football Reference

Kelly Jarrod Jennings (born November 30, 1982) is an American former professional football player who was a cornerback in the National Football League (NFL). He was selected by the Seattle Seahawks in the first round of the 2006 NFL draft. He played college football at the University of Miami.

== Early life ==
Jennings graduated from Suwannee High School in Live Oak, Florida. During his Senior Year he placed 4th at the 2A State Track Meet in the 100 meters, with a time of 10.76 seconds, current NFL Player Yamon Figurs was 2nd, with a time of 10.56 seconds.

== College career ==
Jennings played college football at the University of Miami, where he graduated with a degree in finance and a 3.0 grade point average. He currently is in the process of acquiring a second degree in business management.

== Professional career ==
Pre-draft measurables
Height	Weight	Arm length	Hand span	40-yard dash	10-yard split	20-yard split	20-yard shuttle	Three-cone drill	Vertical jump	Broad jump	Bench press
5 ft 10 7/8 in (1.80 m)	178 lb (81 kg)	31 in (0.79 m)	8 3/4 in (0.22 m)	4.43 s	1.52 s	2.60 s	3.96 s	6.88 s	40.0 in (1.02 m)	10 ft 0 in (3.05 m)	12 reps
All values from NFL Combine/Pro Day

=== Seattle Seahawks ===
Jennings was drafted by the Seahawks out of the University of Miami with the 31st overall pick in the first round of the 2006 NFL draft. Kelly has played for the Seahawks on special teams and defense.

Jennings' selection in the 2006 first round kept alive an ongoing record by the University of Miami, which has had players selected as first-round draft picks in each of the past twelve NFL drafts and the following two drafts after Jennings selection. No other college or university has ever matched this record.

In his rookie season, Jennings served as a nickelback and special teamer primarily until Marcus Trufant, Kelly Herndon, and Jimmy Williams all sustained injuries in week 16 and 17 of the 2006 NFL season. He ended up playing in 16 games, starting in 2, recording 40 tackles, 1 interception, 6 passes defended, 1 forced fumble, and giving up 2 touchdowns. In the postseason, with Seattle's secondary seriously hurting and forced to start safety Jordan Babineaux at #2 CB and previously out of the NFL Pete Hunter at nickel, Jennings was forced into the #1 role for the Wild Card game against the Dallas Cowboys and was primarily used to cover Terry Glenn due to their similar body build and playing styles. Glenn was held to 4 receptions for 41 yards, while Jennings recorded 1 tackle and a game-saving forced fumble on Glenn that would lead to a Seattle safety which would later prove vital in a 21-20 Seahawks victory. In the Divisional Playoff game against the Chicago Bears, Jennings recorded 6 tackles but was beat deep on a 68-yard touchdown pass from Rex Grossman to Bernard Berrian. The Bears ended up winning in overtime 27–24. Kelly Jennings had a great 2007 season as he finished with 55 tackles and 12 pass deflections. Coming into the 2008 season, Kelly had high expectations, but was moved to the nickelback and performed well once again at a position he has proven to be more than capable at. He finished the 2008 season with 42 tackles and 12 pass deflections.

In 2009, he compiled 30 tackles and 5 passes defended.

=== Cincinnati Bengals ===
On August 29, 2011, he was traded to the Cincinnati Bengals for defensive tackle Clinton McDonald.

=== NFL statistics ===
Year	Team	GP	COMB	TOTAL	AST	SACK	FF	FR	FR YDS	INT	IR YDS	AVG IR	LNG	TD	PD
2006	SEA	16	41	38	3	0.0	1	0	0	1	0	0	0	0	6
2007	SEA	16	55	49	6	0.0	0	2	0	0	0	0	0	0	12
2008	SEA	16	42	36	6	0.0	0	0	0	0	0	0	0	0	12
2009	SEA	16	30	27	3	0.0	0	0	0	0	0	0	0	0	5
2010	SEA	14	40	35	5	0.0	0	0	0	1	0	0	0	0	13
2011	CIN	13	33	26	7	1.0	0	0	0	0	0	0	0	0	5
Career		91	241	211	30	1.0	1	2	0	2	0	0	0	0	53

== Personal ==
Kelly is the uncle of CFL cornerback Bruce Johnson. Kelly is married to his wife Fritzie Jennings and has six children. He now lives in Durham, North Carolina
