= Darrell Jackson =

American football player (born 1978)

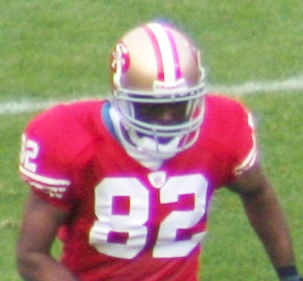
- Jackson with the San Francisco 49ers in 2007

No. 82
- Position: Wide receiver

Personal information
- Born: December 6, 1978 (age 47); Dayton, Ohio, U.S.
- Listed height: 6 ft 0 in (1.83 m)
- Listed weight: 201 lb (91 kg)

Career information
- High school: Tampa Catholic (Tampa, Florida)
- College: Florida (1997–1999)
- NFL draft: 2000: 3rd round, 80th overall pick

Career history
- Seattle Seahawks (2000–2006); San Francisco 49ers (2007); Denver Broncos (2008)

Awards and highlights
- PFWA All-Rookie Team (2000); Seattle Seahawks Top 50 players; Third-team All-American (1999); First-team All-SEC (1999)

Career NFL statistics
- Receptions: 499
- Receiving yards: 7,132
- Receiving touchdowns: 51
- Stats at Pro Football Reference

Darrell Lamont Jackson (born December 6, 1978) is an American former professional football player who was a wide receiver for nine seasons in the National Football League (NFL) during the 2000s. Jackson played college football for the Florida Gators, and thereafter, he played in the NFL for the Seattle Seahawks, the San Francisco 49ers and the Denver Broncos of the NFL.

== Early life ==
Jackson was born in Dayton, Ohio in 1978, one of eight brothers and sisters in his family. He attended Tampa Catholic High School in Tampa, Florida, where he was a standout wide receiver for the Tampa Catholic Crusaders high school football team. As a senior, Jackson set then-national high school records for career receiving yardage (4,594) and average yards per catch (24.05), and caught a total of 191 passes in three seasons for the Crusaders. He had eighty-nine receptions for 2,087 yards and twenty-eight touchdowns as a junior, and sixty-seven receptions as a senior.

Basketball, not football, however, was Jackson's first love. As the sophomore point guard of a basketball team that included only eight players, he led the Crusaders to the 3A crown and was named state tournament most valuable player. As a senior, he led his team to the state tournament one more time in 1997, where it lost in the championship game.

The Tampa Tribune recognized Jackson as one of the 100 greatest Tampa Bay area athletes of the last century in 1999. In 2007, eleven years after he graduated from Tampa Catholic, the Florida High School Athletic Association (FHSAA) recognized Jackson as one of the thirty-three all-time greatest Florida high school football players of the last 100 years by naming him to its "All-Century Team."

== College career ==
Jackson accepted an athletic scholarship to attend the University of Florida in Gainesville, Florida, where he was a wide receiver for coach Steve Spurrier's Florida Gators football team from 1997 to 1999. He saw limited action as a freshman and sophomore, but he was the Gators' leading receiver in Spurrier's "fun 'n' gun" offense as a junior in 1999. During the 1999 season, he had sixty-seven receptions for a total of 1,156 yards (an average of 17.3 yards per catch) and nine touchdowns, and had a memorable three-touchdown outing against the Alabama Crimson Tide. Following his junior year, he was a first-team All-Southeastern Conference (SEC) selection and a third-team All-American.

Jackson decided to forgo his final year of college eligibility, and entered the NFL draft after his junior season; he finished his college career with a total of 1,501 receiving yards.

== Professional career ==
Pre-draft measurables
Height	Weight	Arm length	Hand span	40-yard dash	10-yard split	20-yard split
5 ft 11 3/4 in (1.82 m)	197 lb (89 kg)	31 1/4 in (0.79 m)	9 1/2 in (0.24 m)	4.58 s	1.54 s	2.64 s
All values from NFL Combine

=== Seattle Seahawks ===
The Seattle Seahawks selected Jackson in the third round (eightieth pick overall) in the 2000 NFL draft, and he played for the Seahawks for seven seasons from 2000 to 2006. During the 2004 season, Jackson set a Seahawks franchise record with eighty-seven receptions (broken by Bobby Engram in 2007). On December 18, 2005, he made his first appearance for the Seahawks after returning from an injury that he received playing the Washington Redskins; in this appearance, he helped carry the Seahawks to victory with a touchdown reception.

In Super Bowl XL Jackson tied the record for most receptions made in the first quarter of a Super Bowl with five, tying former Buffalo Bills wide receiver Andre Reed. Despite his brilliant performance, Seattle lost to the Pittsburgh Steelers 21–10. He was denied a touchdown catch in the first quarter, due to a controversial offensive pass interference penalty called by back judge Bob Waggoner.

In Seahawks franchise history he is fifth in receiving yards, fourth in receiving touchdowns and sixth in receptions.

=== San Francisco 49ers ===
On April 29, 2007, Jackson was traded to the San Francisco 49ers for a fourth-round draft pick in the 2007 NFL draft. On March 14, 2008, after a disappointing 2007 season, the San Francisco 49ers placed Jackson on waivers, making him a free agent.

=== Denver Broncos ===
On April 16, 2008, Jackson signed a one-year, $1.5 million contract with the Denver Broncos. He filled in when called upon and started for the suspended Brandon Marshall in week 1, and the injured Eddie Royal in week 6. Despite being third on the depth chart, he managed twelve receptions for 190 yards (a 16.5 yard average).

In his nine-season NFL career, Jackson played in 123 regular season games, started 107 of them, and had 499 receptions for 7,132 yards and fifty-one touchdowns.

== NFL career statistics ==
=== Regular season ===
Year	Team	Games		Receiving					Rushing				
Year	Team	GP	GS	Rec	Yds	Avg	Lng	TD	Att	Yds	Avg	Lng	TD
2000	SEA	16	9	53	713	13.5	71	6	1	-1	-1.0	-1	0
2001	SEA	16	16	70	1,081	15.4	64	8	1	9	9.0	9	0
2002	SEA	13	13	62	877	14.1	48	4	3	3	1.0	4	0
2003	SEA	16	16	68	1,137	16.7	80	9	—	—	—	—	0
2004	SEA	16	16	87	1,199	13.8	56	7	—	—	—	—	0
2005	SEA	6	6	38	482	12.7	48	3	1	7	7.0	7	0
2006	SEA	13	13	63	956	15.2	72	10	—	—	—	—	0
2007	SF	15	15	46	497	10.8	34	3	—	—	—	—	0
2008	DEN	12	2	12	190	15.8	48	1	—	—	—	—	0
Career		123	106	499	7,132	14.3	80	51	6	18	3.0	9	0

=== Postseason ===
Year	Team	Games		Receiving				
Year	Team	GP	GS	Rec	Yds	Avg	Lng	TD
2003	SEA	1	1	5	58	11.6	25	0
2004	SEA	1	1	12	128	10.7	23	1
2005	SEA	3	3	20	268	13.4	37	2
2006	SEA	2	1	4	49	12.3	24	0
Career		7	6	41	503	12.3	37	3

== See also ==
- Florida Gators football, 1990–99
- List of Florida Gators in the NFL draft
- List of Seattle Seahawks players
