= David Kirtman =

American football player (born 1983)

No. 34, 35
- Position: Fullback

Personal information
- Born: February 12, 1983 (age 43); San Francisco, California, U.S.
- Listed height: 6 ft 0 in (1.83 m)
- Listed weight: 238 lb (108 kg)

Career information
- High school: Mercer Island (Mercer Island, Washington)
- College: USC
- NFL draft: 2006: 5th round, 163rd overall pick

Career history
- Seattle Seahawks (2006–2007); San Diego Chargers (2008)*; San Francisco 49ers (2008); New Orleans Saints (2008)*; Seattle Seahawks (2009)*
- * Offseason or practice squad member only
- Stats at Pro Football Reference

David Kirtman (born February 12, 1983) is an American former professional football player who was a fullback in the National Football League (NFL). He played college football for the USC Trojans and was selected by the Seattle Seahawks in the fifth round of the 2006 NFL draft.

Kirtman was also a member of the San Diego Chargers, San Francisco 49ers and New Orleans Saints.

== Early life ==
Kirtman grew up in San Rafael, California until his family moved to Mercer Island, Washington where he graduated from Mercer Island High School. In addition to football, he was a Kingco conference champion in the 110 hurdles and shot put.

== College career ==
Kirtman played college football at the University of Southern California. He was a key part of the 2004 national championship USC teams where he earned the catch phrase "Another Touchdown Courtesy of Kirtman". This refers to his punishing blocking that opened up many rushing touchdowns for Lendale White and Reggie Bush. He graduated from USC with a degree in business.

== Professional career ==
Pre-draft measurables
Height	Weight	Arm length	Hand span	40-yard dash	10-yard split	20-yard split	20-yard shuttle	Three-cone drill	Vertical jump	Broad jump	Bench press
5 ft 11 1/2 in (1.82 m)	233 lb (106 kg)	31 1/4 in (0.79 m)	9 5/8 in (0.24 m)	4.74 s	1.60 s	2.74 s	4.31 s	7.18 s	34.5 in (0.88 m)	9 ft 8 in (2.95 m)	26 reps
All values from NFL Combine/Pro Day

=== Seattle Seahawks (first stint) ===
He was the first fullback picked in the 2006 NFL draft. He was placed on the practice squad for the 2006 season. Kirtman was also Seahawks coach Mike Holmgren's next-door neighbor at the time.

In November 2007, Kirtman was signed to the Seahawks' active roster, and on November 12, he played in his first NFL game against the San Francisco 49ers on Monday night. On August 30, 2008, he was released by the Seahawks.

=== San Diego Chargers ===
On August 31, 2008, he was signed to the San Diego Chargers practice squad. He remained there the first six weeks of the regular season.

=== San Francisco 49ers ===
Kirtman was signed to the active roster of the San Francisco 49ers from the San Diego Chargers' practice squad on October 15 after the 49ers placed fullback Zak Keasey on injured reserve. He was released on November 3 when the team signed tight end Sean Ryan.

=== New Orleans Saints ===
Kirtman was signed to the practice squad of the New Orleans Saints on November 12, 2008.

=== Seattle Seahawks (second stint) ===
Kirtman re-signed with the Seahawks on May 4, 2009. On September 5, 2009, he was released during the final 53 man roster cuts.
