= Jimmy Martin (American football) =

American football player (born 1982)

No. 61
- Position: Tackle

Personal information
- Born: October 19, 1982 (age 44); Fairfax, Virginia, U.S.
- Listed height: 6 ft 5 in (1.96 m)
- Listed weight: 303 lb (137 kg)

Career information
- College: Virginia Tech
- NFL draft: 2006: 7th round, 227th overall pick

Career history
- San Diego Chargers (2006)*; Minnesota Vikings (2006–2007)*; Rhein Fire (2007); New England Patriots (2008)*
- * Offseason or practice squad member only

Awards and highlights
- Second-team All-ACC (2005)

Jimmy Martin (born October 19, 1982) is an American former professional football player who was a tackle in the National Football League (NFL). He played college football for the Virginia Tech Hokies where he was a four-year starter. He was selected in the seventh round of the 2006 NFL draft with the 227th overall pick.

Pre-draft measurables
| Height | Weight | Arm length | Hand span | 40-yard dash | 10-yard split | 20-yard split | Vertical jump | Broad jump | Bench press |
|---|---|---|---|---|---|---|---|---|---|
| 6 ft 5 in (1.96 m) | 303 lb (137 kg) | 33 in (0.84 m) | 9 5/8 in (0.24 m) | 5.14 s | 1.75 s | 2.97 s | 32.0 in (0.81 m) | 8 ft 9 in (2.67 m) | 26 reps |
All values from NFL Combine/Pro Day
