= 2005 All-Atlantic Coast Conference football team =

American college football all-star team

The 2005 All-Atlantic Coast Conference football team consists of American football players chosen by various selectors for their All-Atlantic Coast Conference ("ACC") teams for the 2005 college football season. Selectors in 2005 included the Associated Press (AP).

== Offensive selections ==
=== Wide receivers ===
- Calvin Johnson, Georgia Tech (AP-1)
- Chansi Stuckey, Clemson (AP-1)
- Will Blackmon, Boston College (AP-2)
- Greg Carr, Florida St. (AP-2)

=== Tackles ===
- Eric Winston, Miami (AP-1)
- D'Brickashaw Ferguson, Virginia (AP-1)
- Jimmy Martin, Virginia Tech (AP-2)
- Jeremy Trueblood, Boston College (AP-2)

=== Guards ===
- Jason Murphy, Virginia Tech (AP-1)
- Kyle Ralph, North Carolina (AP-1)
- Josh Beekman, Boston College (AP-2)
- Roman Fry, Clemson (AP-2)

=== Centers ===
- Will Montgomery, Virginia Tech (AP-1)
- Pat Ross, Boston College (AP-2)

=== Tight ends ===
- Vernon Davis, Maryland (AP-1)
- Jeff King, Virginia Tech (AP-2)
- T. J. Williams, NC State (AP-2)

=== Quarterbacks ===
- Marcus Vick, Virginia Tech (AP-1)
- Charlie Whitehurst, Clemson (AP-2)

=== Running backs ===
- Chris Barclay, Wake Forest (AP-1)
- Tyrone Moss, Miami (AP-1)
- Lance Ball, Maryland (AP-2)
- P. J. Daniels, Georgia Tech (AP-2)

== Defensive selections ==
=== Defensive linemen ===
- Mathias Kiwanuka, Boston College (AP-1)
- Darryl Tapp, Virginia Tech (AP-1)
- Mario Williams, NC State (AP-1)
- Manny Lawson, NC State (AP-1)
- Eric Henderson, Georgia Tech (AP-2)
- Brodrick Bunkley, Florida St. (AP-2)
- Kamerion Wimbley, Florida St. (AP-2)
- Jonathan Lewis, Virginia Tech (AP-2)

=== Linebackers ===
- D'Qwell Jackson, Maryland (AP-1)
- Stephen Tulloch, NC State (AP-1)
- Kai Parham, Virginia (AP-1)
- A. J. Nicholson, Florida St. (AP-2)
- Vince Hall, Virginia Tech (AP-2)
- Gerris Wilkinson, Georgia Tech (AP-2)

=== Defensive backs ===
- Jimmy Williams, Virginia Tech (AP-1)
- Kelly Jennings, Miami (AP-1)
- Tye Hill, Clemson (AP-1)
- John Talley, Duke (AP-1)
- Brandon Meriweather, Miami (AP-2)
- Josh Gattis, Wake Forest (AP-2)
- Marcus Hamilton, Virginia (AP-2)
- Dawan Landry, Georgia Tech (AP-2)

== Special teams ==
=== Placekickers ===
- Connor Hughes, Virginia (AP-1)
- Jad Dean, Clemson (AP-2)

=== Punters ===
- Ryan Plackemeier, Wake Forest (AP-1)
- Adam Podlesh, Maryland (AP-2)

=== Return specialist ===
- Devin Hester, Miami (AP-1)
- Darrell Blackman, NC State (AP-2)

== Key ==
AP = Associated Press

== See also ==
- 2005 College Football All-America Team
