= D. J. Hackett =

American football player (born 1981)

No. 18
- Position: Wide receiver

Personal information
- Born: July 3, 1981 (age 45); Fontana, California, U.S.
- Listed height: 6 ft 2 in (1.88 m)
- Listed weight: 208 lb (94 kg)

Career information
- High school: San Dimas (San Dimas, California)
- College: Colorado
- NFL draft: 2004: 5th round, 157th overall pick

Career history
- Seattle Seahawks (2004–2007); Carolina Panthers (2008); Washington Redskins (2009)*
- * Offseason or practice squad member only

Awards and highlights
- Third-team All-Big 12 (2003)

Career NFL statistics
- Receptions: 118
- Receiving yards: 1,575
- Receiving touchdowns: 9
- Stats at Pro Football Reference

DeAndre James "D. J." Hackett (born July 3, 1981) is an American former professional football player who was a wide receiver in the National Football League (NFL). He was selected by the Seattle Seahawks in the fifth round of the 2004 NFL draft. He played college football for the Colorado Buffaloes.

Hackett was also a member of the Carolina Panthers and Washington Redskins.

== Early life ==
DJ Hackett attended grades first through eighth at Pomona First Baptist private school in Pomona California. Hackett attended San Dimas High School in San Dimas, California and was a letterman in football, basketball, and track. In football, as a senior, he won All-Valley Vista League] honors, All-CIF honors, and All-Inland Valley honors, and was named to the Los Angeles All-Star team. Hackett graduated from San Dimas High School in 1999 with a 3.5 grade point average.

== College career ==
=== Cal State Northridge ===
In his freshman year at Cal State Northridge, Hackett appeared in 10 of the Matadors' 11 games. He finished the season with 47 receptions for 728 yards and 7 touchdowns, finishing 2nd on the team in all three categories. As a sophomore, Hackett again finished 2nd on the team in receptions (53) and yards (778), and was tied for the team lead in touchdowns (10).

=== Colorado ===
When Cal State Northridge dropped its football program at the end of the 2001 season, Hackett transferred to the University of Colorado the following year, appearing in 12 of the team's 13 games. In 2003 Hackett led all Buffaloes receivers with 1,013 receiving yards and 78 total receptions, scoring 7 touchdowns.

== Professional career ==
Pre-draft measurables
| Height | Weight | Arm length | Hand span | 40-yard dash | 10-yard split | 20-yard split | 20-yard shuttle | Three-cone drill | Vertical jump | Broad jump |
|---|---|---|---|---|---|---|---|---|---|---|
| 6 ft 2 1/2 in (1.89 m) | 199 lb (90 kg) | 31 1/4 in (0.79 m) | 9 1/2 in (0.24 m) | 4.51 s | 1.52 s | 2.62 s | 4.08 s | 6.79 s | 41.0 in (1.04 m) | 10 ft 11 in (3.33 m) |
All values from NFL Combine

=== Seattle Seahawks ===
Hackett was selected in the fifth round of the 2004 NFL draft by the Seattle Seahawks. Hackett was one of Matt Hasselbecks favorite targets. He played four seasons with the team before becoming a free agent.

=== Carolina Panthers ===
On March 17, 2008, Hackett signed a two-year, $3.5 million contract with the Carolina Panthers. He was released after one season with the team on February 25, 2009.

=== Washington Redskins ===
Hackett was signed by the Washington Redskins on August 5, 2009, after the team waived/injured Roydell Williams. On December 5, 2009, he was released.

== NFL career statistics ==
Legend
| **Bold** | Career high |

=== Regular season ===
| Year | Team | Games | | Receiving | | | | | |
| Year | Team | GP | GS | Tgt | Rec | Yds | Avg | Lng | TD |
|---|---|---|---|---|---|---|---|---|---|
| 2005 | SEA | 13 | 3 | 43 | 28 | 400 | **14.3** | 47 | 2 |
| 2006 | SEA | **14** | 5 | **66** | **45** | **610** | 13.6 | 47 | **4** |
| 2007 | SEA | 6 | **6** | 47 | 32 | 384 | 12.0 | **59** | 3 |
| 2008 | CAR | 9 | 2 | 28 | 13 | 181 | 13.9 | 37 | 0 |
| | | 42 | 16 | 184 | 118 | 1,575 | 13.3 | 59 | 9 |

=== Playoffs ===
| Year | Team | Games | | Receiving | | | | | |
| Year | Team | GP | GS | Tgt | Rec | Yds | Avg | Lng | TD |
|---|---|---|---|---|---|---|---|---|---|
| 2005 | SEA | **3** | 0 | 1 | 0 | 0 | 0.0 | 0 | 0 |
| 2006 | SEA | 1 | 0 | 5 | 2 | 8 | 4.0 | 4 | 0 |
| 2007 | SEA | 2 | **1** | **10** | **8** | **116** | **14.5** | **35** | **1** |
| | | 6 | 1 | 16 | 10 | 124 | 12.4 | 35 | 1 |

== Personal life ==
After his time in the NFL, Hackett has lived in Arizona with his family, and started a vending company which provides all-natural and organic foods to schools to help with school nutrition.

Hackett appeared on the game show Family Feud with his family in April 2014. The Hackett family did not win the episode.
