= Jimmy Williams (cornerback, born 1979) =

American football player (1979–2022)

No. 22, 23
- Position: Cornerback

Personal information
- Born: March 10, 1979; Baton Rouge, Louisiana, U.S.
- Died: July 7, 2022 (aged 43); Baton Rouge, Louisiana, U.S.
- Listed height: 5 ft 11 in (1.80 m)
- Listed weight: 190 lb (86 kg)

Career information
- High school: Episcopal (Baton Rouge)
- College: Vanderbilt (1997–2000)
- NFL draft: 2001: 6th round, 196th overall pick

Career history
- Buffalo Bills (2001)*; San Francisco 49ers (2001–2004); New Orleans Saints (2005)*; Seattle Seahawks (2005–2006); Houston Texans (2008)
- * Offseason or practice squad member only

Awards and highlights
- Second-team All-SEC (1998)

Career NFL statistics
- Games played: 80
- Total tackles: 151
- Forced fumbles: 1
- Fumble recoveries: 6
- Interceptions: 3
- Return yards: 1,847
- Total touchdowns: 1
- Stats at Pro Football Reference

Jimmy Ray Williams (March 10, 1979 – July 7, 2022) was an American professional football player who was a cornerback in the National Football League (NFL). He was drafted by the Buffalo Bills in the sixth round of the 2001 NFL draft. He played college football at Vanderbilt. Williams prepped at Episcopal School of Baton Rouge.

Williams also played for the San Francisco 49ers, Seattle Seahawks, and Houston Texans.

== Vanderbilt career ==
Williams came to Vanderbilt as one of the highest recruited players in school history. He began his career as a running back, where he led the team in rushing yards, return yards, receptions, and touchdowns, landing him on the Freshman All-SEC team. In 1998, following encouragement from head coach Woody Widenhofer, he switched sides of the ball to earn All-SEC honors that same year as a starting cornerback. During the 1999 season against Northern Illinois, Williams returned a punt for a touchdown in the game's final minutes for a 34–31 victory. He is one of only three players in Vanderbilt history to return both a punt and kickoff for a touchdown.

For his career, Williams was among the team's interception and kickoff returns for three straight years. After his senior season, Williams attended the NFL Draft combine in Indianapolis.

In 2013, Williams was selected to the Southeastern Conference Football Legends Class.

== Professional athletic career ==
Pre-draft measurables
Height	Weight	Arm length	Hand span	40-yard dash	10-yard split	20-yard split	Three-cone drill	Vertical jump	Broad jump
5 ft 10 1/8 in (1.78 m)	188 lb (85 kg)	30 1/2 in (0.77 m)	9 in (0.23 m)	4.59 s	1.64 s	2.66 s	7.12 s	36.0 in (0.91 m)	10 ft 0 in (3.05 m)
All values from NFL Combine

Williams was drafted in 2001 NFL draft by the Buffalo Bills with the 33rd pick of the 6th round. He signed, however, with the San Francisco 49ers, where he served as a punt returner and cornerback through the 2004 season. Beginning in 2004, he played for the Seattle Seahawks, which included his first Super Bowl appearance in 2005 as the Seahawks lost to the Steelers. On May 19, 2008, he signed with the Houston Texans. He was not re-signed following the 2008 season and became a free agent.

=== NFL statistics ===
Year	Team	GP	COMB	TOTAL	AST	SACK	FF	FR	FR YDS	INT	IR YDS	AVG IR	LNG	TD	PD
2001	SF	10	6	5	1	0.0	0	0	0	0	0	0	0	0	0
2002	SF	13	12	10	2	0.0	0	1	0	0	0	0	0	0	0
2003	SF	15	22	21	1	0.0	1	1	0	1	6	6	6	0	1
2004	SF	12	47	38	9	1.0	0	1	0	0	0	0	0	0	5
2005	SEA	14	33	25	8	0.0	0	0	0	2	6	3	6	0	5
2006	SEA	16	14	11	3	0.0	0	1	0	0	0	0	0	0	2
Career		80	134	110	24	1.0	1	4	0	3	12	4	6	0	13

== Career after NFL ==
Williams returned to Baton Rouge to give back to his school, Episcopal High School, where he coached the middle school team until 2010. Williams served as the assistant athletic director, in addition to defensive coordinator at Episcopal High School.

== Personal life and death ==
Williams died on July 7, 2022, aged 43.
