= Bobby Engram =

American football player and coach (born 1973)

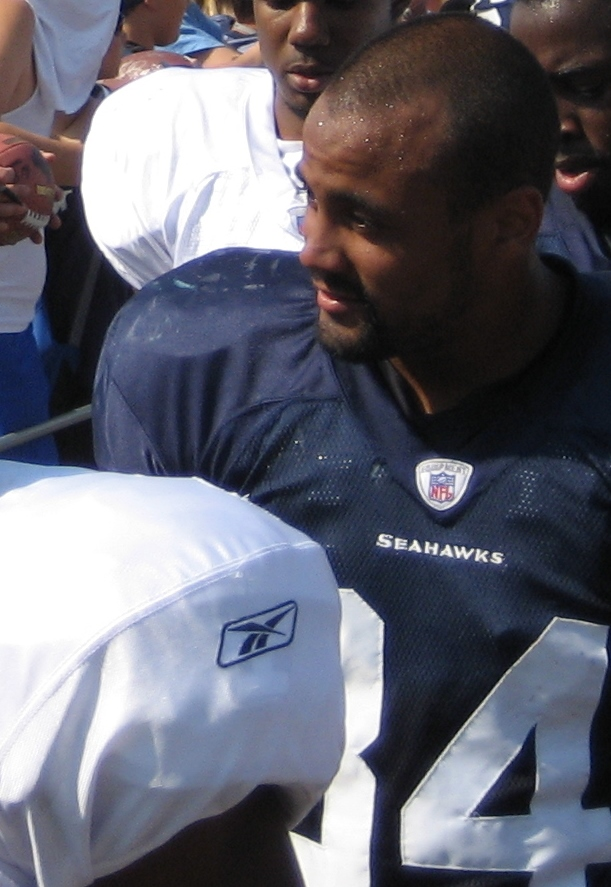
- Engram with the Seattle Seahawks in 2006

Washington Commanders
- Title: Wide receivers coach

Personal information
- Born: January 7, 1973 (age 53); Camden, South Carolina, U.S.
- Listed height: 5 ft 10 in (1.78 m)
- Listed weight: 192 lb (87 kg)

Career information
- Position: Wide receiver (No. 81, 84)
- High school: Camden
- College: Penn State (1991–1995)
- NFL draft: 1996: 2nd round, 52nd overall pick

Career history

Playing
- Chicago Bears (1996–2000); Seattle Seahawks (2001–2008); Kansas City Chiefs (2009); Cleveland Browns (2010)*
- * Offseason or practice squad member only

Coaching
- San Francisco 49ers (2011) Offensive assistant; Pittsburgh Panthers (2012–2013) Wide receivers coach; Baltimore Ravens (2014–2021); Wide receivers coach (2014–2018); Tight ends coach (2019–2021); Wisconsin Badgers (2022) Offensive coordinator & quarterbacks coach; Washington Commanders (2023–present) Wide receivers coach

Awards and highlights
- Seattle Seahawks 35th Anniversary team; Seattle Seahawks Top 50 players; Fred Biletnikoff Award (1994); First-team All-American (1994); Second-team All-American (1995); Third-team All-American (1993); 3× first-team All-Big Ten (1993–1995)

Career NFL statistics
- Receptions: 650
- Receiving yards: 7,751
- Receiving touchdowns: 35
- Stats at Pro Football Reference

Simon J. "Bobby" Engram III (born January 7, 1973) is an American professional football coach and former wide receiver who is the wide receivers coach for the Washington Commanders of the National Football League (NFL). Engram played college football for the Penn State Nittany Lions, earning the 1994 Fred Biletnikoff Award, and was selected by the Chicago Bears in the second round of the 1996 NFL draft. Engram also played for the Seattle Seahawks and Kansas City Chiefs before becoming a coach by the 2010s.

== Early life ==
Engram was born on January 7, 1973, in Camden, South Carolina. He attended Camden High School, where he was a three-time All-State selection at wide receiver. In 1991, Engram's father died in an automobile accident.

== College career ==
Engram enrolled at Pennsylvania State University in 1991. In August 1992, he and fellow Nittany Lions receiver Rick Sayles were arrested and charged with felony counts of burglary, theft, and receiving stolen property when they entered an unlocked apartment to steal various electronics. Both were suspended by the team while Engram received a semester-long suspension from the university, after which he dropped out of school. Following a year in the Centre County's adult rehabilitation program, Engram re-enrolled and rejoined the team for the 1993 season.

As a college junior, Engram was the go-to receiver on Penn State's undefeated 1994 team. He garnered All-American honors and won the inaugual Biletnikoff Award, recognizing the season's outstanding college football receiver. Engram was the Nittany Lions' career receptions leader until 2008. He is still the all-time leader in yards and touchdowns with 3,026 yards and 31 touchdowns. He also racked up 786 career punt return yards for the Nittany Lions, ranking him second in school history. He graduated in 1995 with a Bachelor of Science degree in exercise science.

== Professional career ==
Pre-draft measurables
Height	Weight	Arm length	Hand span
5 ft 9 5/8 in (1.77 m)	187 lb (85 kg)	30 1/4 in (0.77 m)	9 1/8 in (0.23 m)
All values from NFL Combine

=== Chicago Bears ===
Engram was selected in the second round of the 1996 NFL draft, 52nd overall to the Chicago Bears. In his rookie season, he had 33 receptions for 389 yards and 6 touchdown catches. He also returned kicks. In 1999, he had his first 10-reception game in week 15 with 10 receptions for 94 yards and a touchdown, following this with a franchise-record 13 receptions 143 yards and two touchdowns. The following season, he had just 16 receptions in three games before injury ended his 5 seasons with the Bears.

=== Seattle Seahawks ===
Engram signed with the Seattle Seahawks before the 2001 season. He would spend 8 seasons with the Seahawks and reached the 1,000-yard receiving threshold in 2007 (94 catches, 1,147 yards), which was the only 1,000-yard season of his career.

Despite being a starter in only 67 of the 109 games he played with Seattle, Engram ranks fifth in franchise history in receptions (399) and fourth in receiving yards (4,859). His 94 receptions in 2007 was a Seahawks single-season record (since surpassed by Tyler Lockett), and he led the team in catches during the team's Super Bowl XL season in 2005 with 67.

Engram was named to the Seahawks' 35th Anniversary Team in 2011.

=== Kansas City Chiefs ===
Engram joined the Kansas City Chiefs in 2009, but only played in 5 games for the team.

=== Cleveland Browns ===
Engram signed with the Cleveland Browns in the 2010 preseason, but failed to make the roster and was released before the regular season began.

=== Retirement ===
On January 28, 2011, Engram announced his retirement from playing.

== NFL career statistics ==
Legend
**Bold**	Career high

=== Regular season ===
Year	Team	Games		Receiving					Rushing				
Year	Team	GP	GS	Rec	Yds	Avg	Lng	TD	Att	Yds	Avg	Lng	TD
1996	CHI	**16**	2	33	389	11.8	24	**6**	–	–	–	–	–
1997	CHI	11	11	45	399	8.9	23	2	–	–	–	–	–
1998	CHI	**16**	**16**	64	987	**15.4**	**79**	5	1	3	3	3	0
1999	CHI	**16**	14	88	947	10.8	56	4	**2**	**11**	**5.5**	**9**	0
2000	CHI	3	3	16	109	6.8	25	0	1	1	1	1	0
2001	SEA	**16**	4	29	400	13.8	31	0	–	–	–	–	–
2002	SEA	15	6	50	619	12.4	38	0	–	–	–	–	–
2003	SEA	**16**	7	52	637	12.3	34	**6**	–	–	–	–	–
2004	SEA	13	7	36	499	13.9	60	2	–	–	–	–	–
2005	SEA	13	13	67	778	11.6	56	3	–	–	–	–	–
2006	SEA	7	6	24	290	12.1	25	1	1	4	4	4	0
2007	SEA	**16**	13	**94**	**1,147**	12.2	49	**6**	–	–	–	–	–
2008	SEA	13	11	47	489	10.4	37	0	–	–	–	–	–
2009	KC	5	0	5	61	12.2	18	0	–	–	–	–	–
Career		176	113	650	7,751	11.9	79	35	5	19	3.8	9	0

=== Postseason ===
Year	Team	Games		Receiving					Rushing				
Year	Team	GP	GS	Rec	Yds	Avg	Lng	TD	Att	Yds	Avg	Lng	TD
2003	SEA	1	1	4	83	**20.8**	34	0	–	–	–	–	–
2004	SEA	1	1	3	34	11.3	19	**1**	–	–	–	–	–
2005	SEA	**3**	**3**	**11**	115	10.5	21	0	–	–	–	–	–
2006	SEA	2	1	7	120	17.1	**36**	0	–	–	–	–	–
2007	SEA	2	1	10	**124**	12.4	22	**1**	–	–	–	–	–
Career		9	7	35	476	13.6	36	2	0	0	0.0	0	0

== Professional coaching career ==
=== San Francisco 49ers ===
The same day, Engram announced his retirement, he also accepted a job as an offensive assistant coach for the San Francisco 49ers.

=== Pittsburgh Panthers ===
In 2012, it was announced that Engram would become the wide receivers coach for the Pittsburgh Panthers.

=== Baltimore Ravens ===
On February 6, 2014, the Baltimore Ravens announced Engram as their new wide receivers coach. On January 11, 2018, the Ravens announced his job switch as their tight ends coach.

=== Wisconsin Badgers ===
Engram was the offensive coordinator for the Wisconsin Badgers during the 2022 season.

=== Washington Commanders ===
Engram was hired as the wide receivers coach for the Washington Commanders on March 9, 2023. Following the hiring of new head coach Dan Quinn in February 2024, Quinn chose to retain Engram on his coaching staff.

== Personal life ==
Engram and his wife Deanna have four children, one of whom died from sickle-cell disease in 2018. In 2006, Engram was diagnosed with Graves-Basedow disease, which caused him to miss playing time during the season.
