= Jason Murphy =

American football player (born 1982)

No. 61
- Position: Guard / Tackle

Personal information
- Born: August 7, 1982 (age 44); Baltimore, Maryland, U.S.
- Listed height: 6 ft 2 in (1.88 m)
- Listed weight: 304 lb (138 kg)

Career information
- College: Virginia Tech
- NFL draft: 2006: undrafted

Career history
- San Diego Chargers (2006)*; Seattle Seahawks (2006–2007)*; Frankfurt Galaxy (2007); Tennessee Titans (2007–2009)*; New York Sentinels (2009); Florida Tuskers (2010)*; Baltimore Ravens (2011)*
- * Offseason or practice squad member only

Awards and highlights
- First-team All-ACC (2005)
- Stats at Pro Football Reference

Jason Murphy (born August 7, 1982) is an American former football guard and offensive tackle. He was signed by the San Diego Chargers as an undrafted free agent in 2006. He played college football at Virginia Tech.

Murphy was also a member of the Seattle Seahawks, Tennessee Titans, New York Sentinels, Florida Tuskers and Baltimore Ravens.
