= Pat Ross (businessman) =

Canadian businessman

- Born: 1960; Edmonton, Alberta, Canada
- Occupation(s): Chief executive officer, Steeplejack Industrial

Pat Ross (born 1960, Edmonton, Alberta) is the current chief executive officer and director of Steeplejack Industrial. Prior to Steeplejack Industrial, he worked at Fasco. He moved up from salesperson, President, and part owner. Following this, he joined Wittke where he eventually became the CEO. Upon the sale of Wittke, Ross joined private equity firm Polar Capital and through this experience went on to become the CEO of Steeplejack Industrial.
