= Pat Ross (American football) =

American football player (born 1983)

No. 70, 68
- Position: Center

Personal information
- Born: March 16, 1983 (age 43); Cincinnati, Ohio, U.S.
- Listed height: 6 ft 3 in (1.91 m)
- Listed weight: 300 lb (136 kg)

Career information
- High school: St. Xavier (Cincinnati)
- College: Boston College
- NFL draft: 2006: undrafted

Career history
- Seattle Seahawks (2006–2007)*; New England Patriots (2007)*; Indianapolis Colts (2007–2008)*; Carolina Panthers (2008)*; Arizona Cardinals (2008)
- * Offseason or practice squad member only

Awards and highlights
- Second-team All-ACC (2005); Second-team All-Big East (2004)

Patrick George Ross (born March 16, 1983) is an American former football center. He was signed by the Seattle Seahawks as an undrafted free agent in 2006. He graduated from St. Xavier High School in 2001 and played college football at Boston College.

Ross has also been a member of the New England Patriots, Indianapolis Colts, Carolina Panthers and Arizona Cardinals.
