= Kelly Herndon =

American football player (born 1976)

No. 31, 41
- Position: Cornerback

Personal information
- Born: November 3, 1976 (age 50); Twinsburg, Ohio, U.S.
- Listed height: 5 ft 11 in (1.80 m)
- Listed weight: 180 lb (82 kg)

Career information
- High school: Twinsburg
- College: Toledo
- NFL draft: 1999: undrafted

Career history
- San Francisco 49ers (1999)*; Barcelona Dragons (2000); San Francisco 49ers (2000)*; Las Vegas Outlaws (2001); New York Giants (2001)*; Denver Broncos (2001–2004); Seattle Seahawks (2005–2006); Tennessee Titans (2007)
- * Offseason or practice squad member only

Career NFL statistics
- Total tackles: 271
- Forced fumbles: 8
- Fumble recoveries: 4
- Pass deflections: 66
- Interceptions: 9
- Defensive touchdowns: 1
- Stats at Pro Football Reference

Kelly Errin Herndon (born November 3, 1976) is an American former professional football player who was a cornerback in the National Football League (NFL). He played college football for the Toledo Rockets and was signed by the San Francisco 49ers as an undrafted free agent in 1999. Although he entered his first NFL camp in 1999, Herndon waited until 2002 to play in his first NFL game. The wait included two training camps with the San Francisco 49ers, one with the New York Giants, one season in the XFL, a spring in Barcelona with NFL Europe and one season serving on the Giants’ and Denver Broncos practice squads.

Herndon was also a member of the Las Vegas Outlaws, Barcelona Dragons, New York Giants, Denver Broncos, Seattle Seahawks and Tennessee Titans in his career.

== Early life ==
Herndon graduated from Chamberlin High School in Twinsburg, Ohio.

== College Career ==
Kelly Herndon attended University of Toledo, where he played for coach Gary Pinkel's Toledo team from 1995 to 1998.

Herndon won four letters and was a two-year starter at cornerback for the Rockets. He had 154 career tackles and four interceptions. As a senior he started all 12 games, finishing sixth on the team with 72 tackles and picking off three interceptions and leading the team with nine pass breakups.

== Professional career ==
His most notable performance was in Super Bowl XL playing for the Seattle Seahawks, Herndon intercepted a Ben Roethlisberger pass, returning it 76 yards, establishing a new Super Bowl record. The record was subsequently broken by James Harrison.

== Personal life ==
- In Twinsburg, Ohio (population approx. 17,000), a small town about 45 minutes from Cleveland, there is a sign that reads, "Home of NFL Player Kelly Herndon." The sign was erected in 2004.
- Was a classmate and teammate on Chamberlin High School's basketball team with James Posey of the New Orleans Hornets.
- Was a defensive back on the XFL's Las Vegas Outlaws in 2001 during the league's one and only season.
- Girlfriend gave birth to his sons, KJ in June 2006 and Kyson in 2010.
