= 2008 Seattle Seahawks season =

American football team season

- Owner: Paul Allen
- General manager: Tim Ruskell
- Head coach: Mike Holmgren
- Home stadium: Qwest Field

Results
- Record: 4–12
- Division place: 3rd NFC West
- Playoffs: Did not qualify
- All-Pros: OT Walter Jones (2nd team)
- Pro Bowlers: OT Walter Jones; LB Julian Peterson

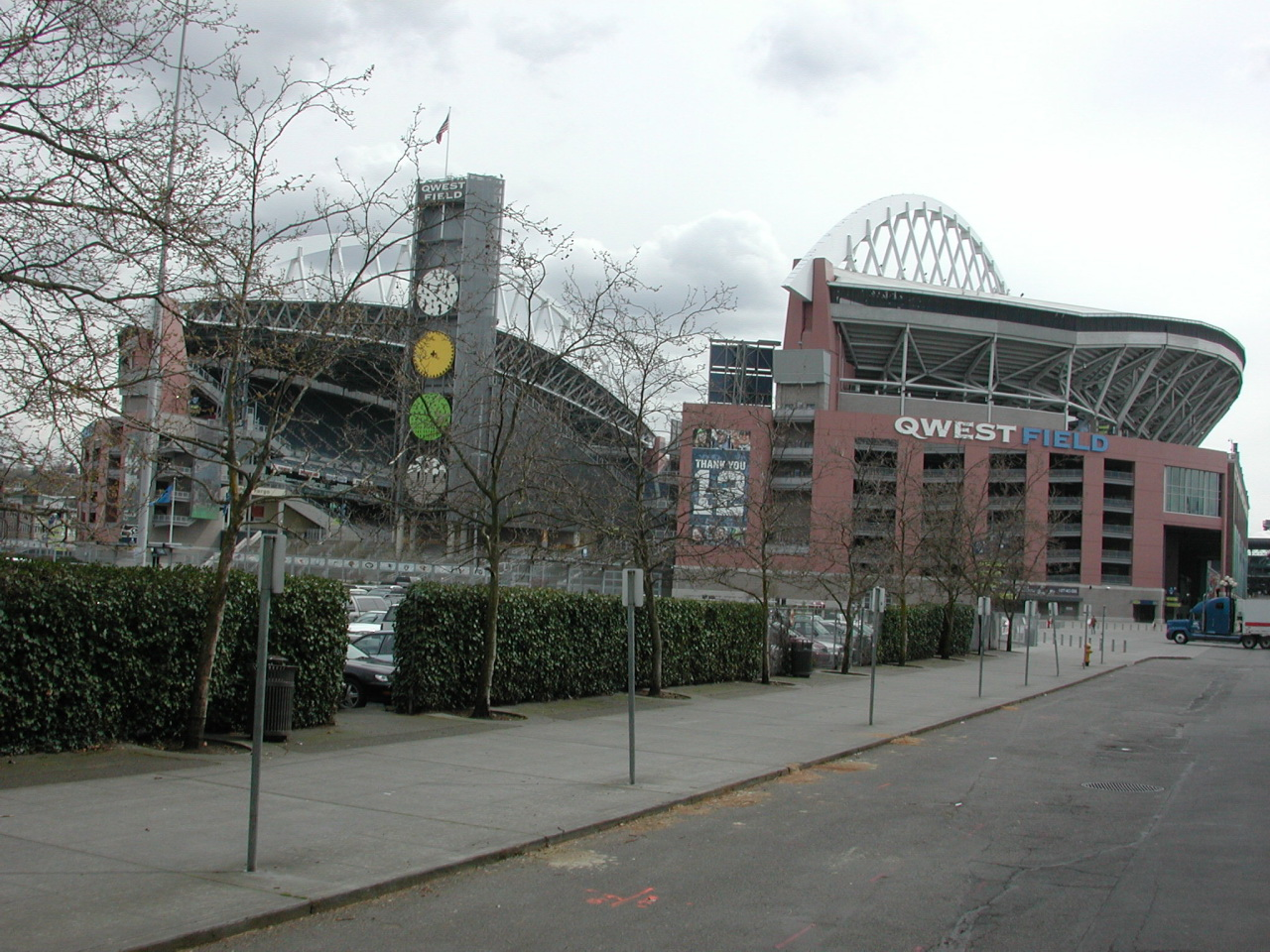
Qwest Field in September 2008

The 2008 Seattle Seahawks season was the franchise's 33rd season in the National Football League (NFL), the seventh season in Qwest Field, and the tenth and final under head coach Mike Holmgren. The Seahawks' streak of four consecutive NFC West divisional championships was broken, as they fell to a 4–12 record and missed the playoffs for the first time since 2002.

== 2008 NFL draft ==
2008 Seattle Seahawks draft
Round	Selection	Player	Position	College	Notes
1	28	Lawrence Jackson	DE	USC	
2	38	John Carlson	TE	Notre Dame	
4	121	Red Bryant	DT	Texas A&M	
5	163	Owen Schmitt	FB	West Virginia	
6	189	Tyler Schmitt	LS	San Diego State	
7	233	Justin Forsett	RB	Cal	
7	235	Brandon Coutu	PK	Georgia	

== Personnel ==
=== Front Office / Coaches ===
2008 Seattle Seahawks staff
**Front office**: Owner/chairman – Paul Allen; President/CEO – Tod Leiweke; President of football operations/general manager – Tim Ruskell; Vice president of player personnel – Ruston Webster; Vice president of football administration – John Idzik, Jr.; Director of pro personnel – Will Lewis; Director of pro scouting - Chris Culmer; Western region director of college scouting – Scott Fitterer; Eastern region director of college scouting – Mike Yowarsky; **Head coaches**: Head Coach – Mike Holmgren; Assistant head coach / Defensive Backs Coach – Jim L. Mora; Assistant head coach / Offensive Coordinator - Gil Haskell; **Offensive coaches**: Quarterbacks – Bill Lazor; Running backs – Kasey Dunn; Wide receivers – Keith Gilbertson; Tight ends – Jim Lind; Offensive line – Mike Solari	**Defensive coaches**: Defensive Coordinator – John Marshall; Defensive Line – Dwaine Board; Linebackers – Zerick Rollins; Assistant defensive backs – Larry Marmie; **Special teams coaches**: Special Teams Coordinator – Bruce DeHaven; Special Teams Assistant Coach - John Jamison; Quality Control - Chris Beake; **Strength and conditioning**: Head strength and conditioning – Mike Clark; Assistant strength and conditioning – Darren Krein

=== Final roster ===
2008 Seattle Seahawks roster
**Quarterbacks (QB)**: 5 Charlie Frye; 8 Matt Hasselbeck; 3 Jeff Rowe; **15** Seneca Wallace; **Running backs (RB)**: 42 T. J. Duckett; 30 Justin Forsett; **22** Julius Jones; 20 Maurice Morris; 35 Owen Schmitt; 43 Leonard Weaver; **Wide receivers (WR)**: **83** Deion Branch; **84** Bobby Engram; 82 Jordan Kent; **18** Koren Robinson; 86 Courtney Taylor; **Tight ends (TE)**: **89** John Carlson; 85 Will Heller	**Offensive linemen (OL)**: 70 Na'Shan Goddard T; 64 Steve McKinney C/G; **69** Steve Vallos C/G; **78** Kyle Williams T; **74** Ray Willis G/T; **77** Floyd Womack G; **66** Mansfield Wrotto G; **Defensive linemen (DL)**: 91 Baraka Atkins DE; **99** Rocky Bernard DT; 79 Red Bryant DT; 94 Howard Green DT; **95** Lawrence Jackson DE; **92** Brandon Mebane DT; 90 Brandon Miller DE; **55** Darryl Tapp DE; 93 Craig Terrill DT	**Linebackers (LB)**: 59 David Hawthorne MLB; 54 Will Herring OLB; **56** Leroy Hill OLB; 50 Lance Laury OLB; 58 D. D. Lewis OLB; **98** Julian Peterson OLB; **51** Lofa Tatupu MLB; **Defensive backs (DB)**: 36 Jamar Adams SS; 27 Jordan Babineaux CB/S; **24** Deon Grant SS; 32 Kevin Hobbs CB; 21 Kelly Jennings CB; **25** Brian Russell FS; **23** Marcus Trufant CB; 39 C. J. Wallace FS; **26** Josh Wilson CB; **Special teams (ST)**: 7 Brandon Coutu K; 10 Olindo Mare K; 49 Jeff Robinson LS; 9 Jon Ryan P	**Practice squad**: 72 Kevin Brown DT; 16 Michael Bumpus WR; 29 Marquis Floyd CB; 46 Joe Newton TE; 63 Donovan Raiola C; 60 Erik Robertson G; 17 Trent Shelton WR; **Reserve**: 81 Nate Burleson WR (IR); 28 DeMichael Dizer CB (IR); 71 Walter Jones T (IR); 97 Patrick Kerney DE (IR); 75 Sean Locklear T (IR); 53 Wesly Mallard LB (IR); 87 Ben Obomanu WR (IR); 19 Logan Payne WR (IR); 73 William Robinson T (IR); 48 Tyler Schmitt LS (IR); 67 Rob Sims G (IR); 65 Chris Spencer C (IR); 68 Mike Wahle G (IR); Rookies in italics 53 active, 13 reserve, 7 practice squad

- Starters in bold.
- (*) Denotes players that were selected for the 2009 Pro Bowl.

=== Notable roster additions ===
- G Mike Wahle- Signed as a free agent from the Carolina Panthers
- RB Julius Jones- Signed as a free agent from the Dallas Cowboys
- RB TJ Duckett- Signed as a free agent from the Detroit Lions
- K Olindo Mare- Signed as a free agent from the New Orleans Saints
- DT Larry Tripplett- Signed as a free agent from the Buffalo Bills (released before the start of the regular season)
- TE Jeb Putzier- Signed as a free agent from the Houston Texans (released during regular season)
- P Reggie Hodges- Signed as a free agent (released before the start of the regular season)

=== Notable roster losses ===
- K Josh Brown- Left as a free agent to sign with the St. Louis Rams
- WR D.J. Hackett- Left as a free agent to sign with the Carolina Panthers
- DT Chuck Darby- Left as a free agent to sign with the Detroit Lions
- T Tom Ashworth- Released
- RB Shaun Alexander- Released
- G Chris Gray – Retired

=== Team captains ===
- Matt Hasselbeck
- Walter Jones
- Deon Grant
- Lofa Tatupu
- Lance Laury
- D. D. Lewis

== Schedule ==
=== Preseason ===
Week	Date	Opponent	Result	Record	Game site	Recap
1	August 8	at Minnesota Vikings	**W** 34–17	1–0	Hubert H. Humphrey Metrodome	Recap
2	August 16	Chicago Bears	**W** 29–26	2–0	Qwest Field	Recap
3	August 25	at San Diego Chargers	**L** 17–18	2–1	Qualcomm Stadium	Recap
4	August 29	Oakland Raiders	**W** 23–16	3–1	Qwest Field	Recap

=== Regular season ===
Week	Date	Opponent	Result	Record	Game site	Recap
1	September 7	at Buffalo Bills	**L** 10–34	0–1	Ralph Wilson Stadium	Recap
2	September 14	**San Francisco 49ers**	**L** 30–33 (OT)	0–2	Qwest Field	Recap
3	September 21	**St. Louis Rams**	**W** 37–13	1–2	Qwest Field	Recap
4	Bye					
5	October 5	at New York Giants	**L** 6–44	1–3	Giants Stadium	Recap
6	October 12	Green Bay Packers	**L** 17–27	1–4	Qwest Field	Recap
7	October 19	at Tampa Bay Buccaneers	**L** 10–20	1–5	Raymond James Stadium	Recap
8	October 26	at **San Francisco 49ers**	**W** 34–13	2–5	Candlestick Park	Recap
9	November 2	Philadelphia Eagles	**L** 7–26	2–6	Qwest Field	Recap
10	November 9	at Miami Dolphins	**L** 19–21	2–7	Dolphin Stadium	Recap
11	November 16	**Arizona Cardinals**	**L** 20–26	2–8	Qwest Field	Recap
12	November 23	Washington Redskins	**L** 17–20	2–9	Qwest Field	Recap
13	November 27	at Dallas Cowboys	**L** 9–34	2–10	Texas Stadium	Recap
14	December 7	New England Patriots	**L** 21–24	2–11	Qwest Field	Recap
15	December 14	at **St. Louis Rams**	**W** 23–20	3–11	Edward Jones Dome	Recap
16	December 21	New York Jets	**W** 13–3	4–11	Qwest Field	Recap
17	December 28	at **Arizona Cardinals**	**L** 21–34	4–12	University of Phoenix Stadium	Recap

Bold indicates division opponents.
Source: 2008 NFL season results

== Standings ==
NFC West
	W	L	T	PCT	DIV	CONF	PF	PA	STK
^{(4)} Arizona Cardinals	9	7	0	.563	6–0	7–5	427	426	W1
San Francisco 49ers	7	9	0	.438	3–3	5–7	339	381	W2
Seattle Seahawks	4	12	0	.250	3–3	3–9	294	392	L1
St. Louis Rams	2	14	0	.125	0–6	2–10	232	465	L10

== Game summaries ==
=== Preseason ===
==== Week P1: at Minnesota Vikings ====
Preseason Week One: Seattle Seahawks at Minnesota Vikings – Game summary

Quarter	1	2	3	4	Total
Seahawks	17	0	14	3	34
Vikings	7	10	0	0	17

at Metrodome, Minneapolis

- Date: August 8
- Game time: 7:10pm local
- Game weather: indoors
- Game attendance: 62,545
- Referee: John Parry
- TV: KONG
- Gamecenter, Gamebook

==== Week P2: vs. Chicago Bears ====
Preseason Week Two: Seattle Seahawks vs. Chicago Bears – Game summary

Quarter	1	2	3	4	OT	Total
Bears	0	5	14	7	0	26
Seahawks	6	3	0	17	3	29

at Qwest Field, Seattle

- Date: August 16
- Game time: 6:08pm local
- Game weather: clear, 86 °F (30 °C), 34% humidity, wind NW 10 miles per hour (16 km/h)
- Game attendance: 67,360
- Referee: Tony Corrente
- TV: KONG
- Gamecenter, Gamebook

==== Week P3: at San Diego Chargers ====
Preseason Week Three: Seattle Seahawks at San Diego Chargers – Game summary

Quarter	1	2	3	4	Total
Seahawks	7	0	3	7	17
Chargers	0	10	0	8	18

at Qualcomm Stadium, San Diego, California

- Date: August 25
- Game time: 5:05pm local
- Game weather: clear, 79 °F (26 °C), 73% humidity, wind WSW 8 miles per hour (13 km/h)
- Game attendance: 52,763
- Referee: Ed Hochuli
- TV: ESPN
- Gamecenter, Gamebook

==== Week P4: vs. Oakland Raiders ====
Preseason Week Four: Seattle Seahawks vs. Oakland Raiders – Game summary

Quarter	1	2	3	4	Total
Raiders	0	6	3	7	16
Seahawks	10	3	3	7	23

at Qwest Field, Seattle

- Date: August 29
- Game time: 7:07pm local
- Game weather: partly cloudy, 66 °F (19 °C), 73% humidity, wind NW 3 miles per hour (4.8 km/h)
- Game attendance: 67,163
- Referee: Mike Carey
- TV: KING
- Gamecenter, Gamebook

=== Regular season ===
==== Week 1: at Buffalo Bills ====
Week One: Seattle Seahawks at Buffalo Bills – Game summary

Quarter	1	2	3	4	Total
Seahawks	0	7	3	0	10
Bills	7	13	14	0	34

at Ralph Wilson Stadium, Orchard Park, New York

- Date: September 7
- Game time: 1:02 pm local
- Game weather: cloudy, 66 °F (19 °C), 65% humidity, wind WSW 11 miles per hour (18 km/h)
- Game attendance: 71,194
- Referee: Walt Coleman
- TV announcers (Fox): Ron Pitts, Tony Boselli and Charissa Thompson
- Gamecenter, Gamebook

Game information

First quarter

- BUF – Marshawn Lynch 21-yard run (Rian Lindell kick), 2:44. Bills 7–0. Drive: 4 plays, 52 yards, 1:20.

Second quarter

- BUF – Roscoe Parrish 63-yard punt return (Rian Lindell kick), 6:20. Bills 14–0.
- SEA – Nate Burleson 20-yard pass from Matt Hasselbeck (Olindo Mare kick), 4:45. Bills 14–7. Drive: 4 plays, 54 yards, 1:35.
- BUF – Rian Lindell 35-yard field goal, 1:00. Bills 17–7. Drive: 9 plays, 63 yards, 3:45.
- BUF – Rian Lindell 38-yard field goal, 0:00. Bills 20–7. Drive: 4 plays, 27 yards, 0:34.

Third quarter

- SEA – Olindo Mare 45-yard field goal, 6:42. Bills 20–10. Drive: 5 plays, 25 yards, 0:56.
- BUF – Ryan Denney 19-yard pass from Brian Moorman (Trent Edwards kick), 2:21. Bills 27–10. Drive: 8 plays, 80 yards, 4:21.
- BUF – Robert Royal 30-yard pass from Trent Edwards (Trent Edwards kick), 2:01. Bills 34–10. Drive: 1 play, 30 yards, 0:08.

Fourth quarter

- No scoring plays.

Top passers

- SEA – Matt Hasselbeck: 17/41, 190 yds, 1 TD, 1 INT
- BUF – Trent Edwards: 19/30, 215 yds, 1 TD

Top rushers

- SEA – Julius Jones: 13 car, 45 yds
- BUF – Marshawn Lynch: 18 car, 76 yds, 1 TD

Top receivers

- SEA – Nate Burleson: 5 rec, 60 yds, 1 TD
- BUF – Lee Evans: 4 rec, 102 yds

Team – pass – rush – total – to

- SEA – 167 – 85 – 252 – 2
- BUF – 232 – 106 – 338 – 0

The Seahawks began their 2008 campaign on the road against the Buffalo Bills. In the first quarter, Seattle trailed early as Bills running back Marshawn Lynch got a 21-yard touchdown run. In the second quarter, the Seahawks continued to struggle as wide receiver/punt returner Roscoe Parrish returned a punt 63 yards for a touchdown. Seattle responded with quarterback Matt Hasselbeck completing a 20-yard touchdown pass to wide receiver Nate Burleson. Buffalo closed out the half with kicker Rian Lindell getting a 35-yard and a 38-yard field goal. In the third quarter, the Seahawks replied with kicker Olindo Mare nailing a 45-yard field goal. However, the Bills pulled a trick play on Seattle. Appearing to go for a 32-yard field goal, Buffalo's holder (punter Brian Moorman) instead threw a 19-yard touchdown pass to defensive end Ryan Denney. The Bills pulled away with quarterback Trent Edwards completing a 30-yard touchdown pass to tight end Robert Royal.

With the loss, the Seahawks began their season at 0–1.

==== Week 2: vs. San Francisco 49ers ====
Week Two: Seattle Seahawks vs. San Francisco 49ers – Game summary

Quarter	1	2	3	4	OT	Total
49ers	3	10	14	3	3	33
Seahawks	14	6	0	10	0	30

at Qwest Field, Seattle

- Date: September 14
- Game time: 1:06 pm local
- Game weather: clear, 67 °F (19 °C), 63% humidity, wind NNW 6 miles per hour (9.7 km/h)
- Game attendance: 67,951
- Referee: Jerome Boger
- TV announcers (Fox): Kenny Albert, Daryl Johnston & Tony Siragusa
- Gamecenter, Gamebook

Game information

First quarter

- SEA – Julius Jones 27-yard run (Olindo Mare kick), 9:12. Seahawks 7–0. Drive: 9 plays, 80 yards, 2:41.
- SEA – Craig Terrill 10-yard defensive fumble return (Olindo Mare kick), 7:47. Seahawks 14–0.
- SF – Joe Nedney 26-yard field goal, 2:36. Seahawks 14–3. Drive: 9 plays, 41 yards, 5:11.

Second quarter

- SF – Joe Nedney 28-yard field goal, 7:22. Seahawks 14–6. Drive: 10 plays, 70 yards, 5:53.
- SEA – Olindo Mare 51-yard field goal, 2:49. Seahawks 17–6. Drive: 6 plays, 18 yards, 2:03.
- SF – Bryant Johnson 3-yard pass from J. T. O'Sullivan (Joe Nedney kick), 1:42. Seahawks 17–13. Drive: 4 plays, 80 yards, 1:07.
- SEA – Olindo Mare 38-yard field goal, 0:00. Seahawks 20–13. Drive: 7 plays, 41 yards, 1:42.

Third quarter

- SF – Patrick Willis 86-yard interception return (Joe Nedney kick), 8:46. Tied 20–20.
- SF – Frank Gore 2-yard run (Joe Nedney kick), 6:41. 49ers 27–20. Drive: 4 plays, 41 yards, 1:46.

Fourth quarter

- SEA – T. J. Duckett 1-yard run (Olindo Mare kick), 14:20. Tied 27–27. Drive: 15 plays, 74 yards, 7:21.
- SEA – Olindo Mare 32-yard field goal, 7:41. Seahawks 30–27. Drive: 9 plays, 41 yards, 4:12.
- SF – Joe Nedney 28-yard field goal, 2:42. Tied 30–30. Drive: 12 plays, 58 yards, 4:59.

Overtime

- SF – Joe Nedney 40-yard field goal, 10:20. 49ers 33–30. Drive: 10 plays, 57 yards, 4:40.

Top passers

- SF – J. T. O'Sullivan: 20/32, 321 yds, 1 TD
- SEA – Matt Hasselbeck: 18/36, 189 yds, 2 INT

Top rushers

- SF – Frank Gore: 19 car, 61 yds, 1 TD
- SEA – Julius Jones: 26 car, 127 yds, 1 TD

Top receivers

- SF – Isaac Bruce: 4 rec, 153 yds
- SEA – John Carlson: 6 rec, 78 yds

Team – pass – rush – total – to

- SF – 272 – 93 – 365 – 1
- SEA – 182 – 169 – 351 – 3

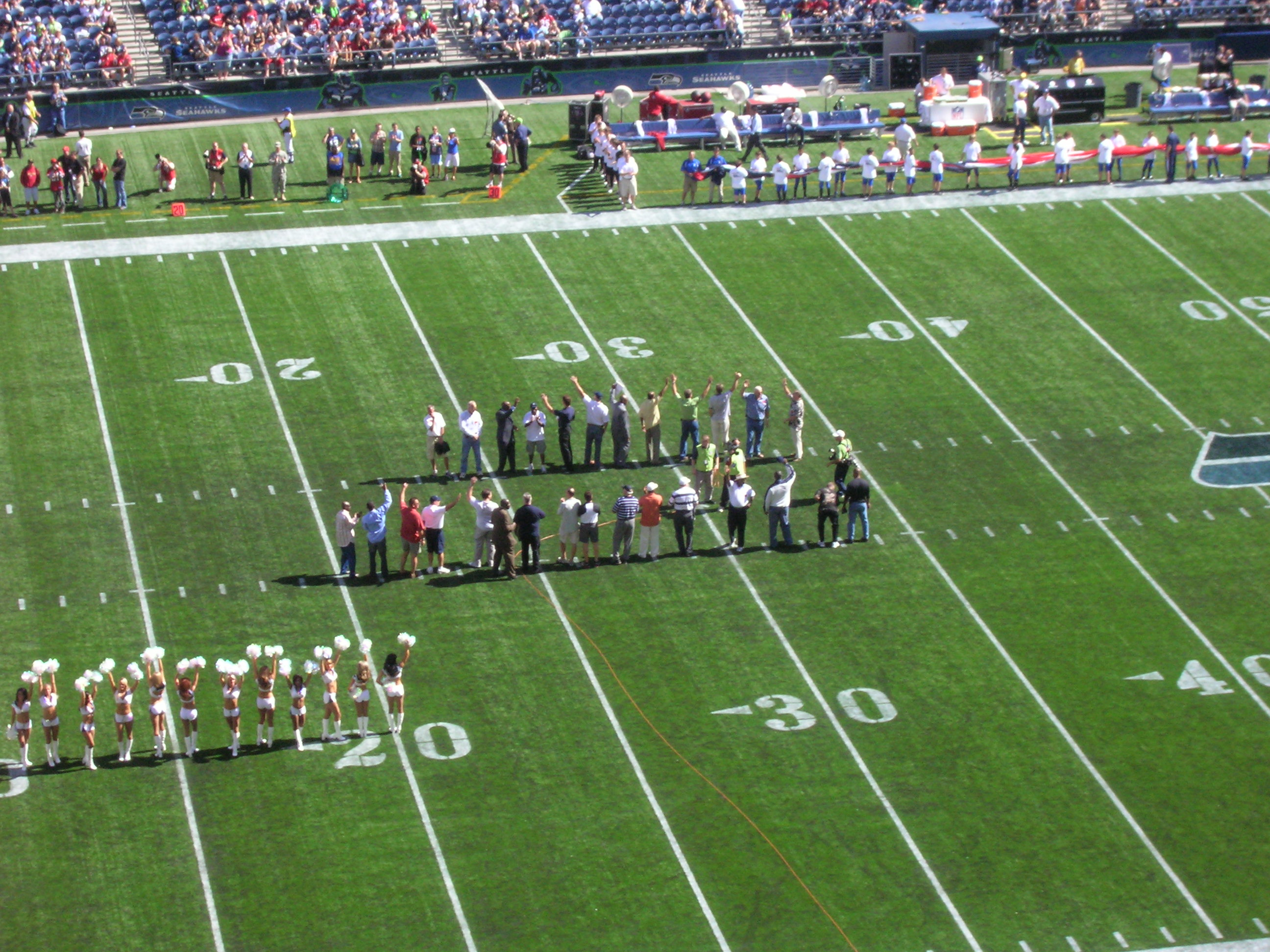
Seahawks alumni before the home opener

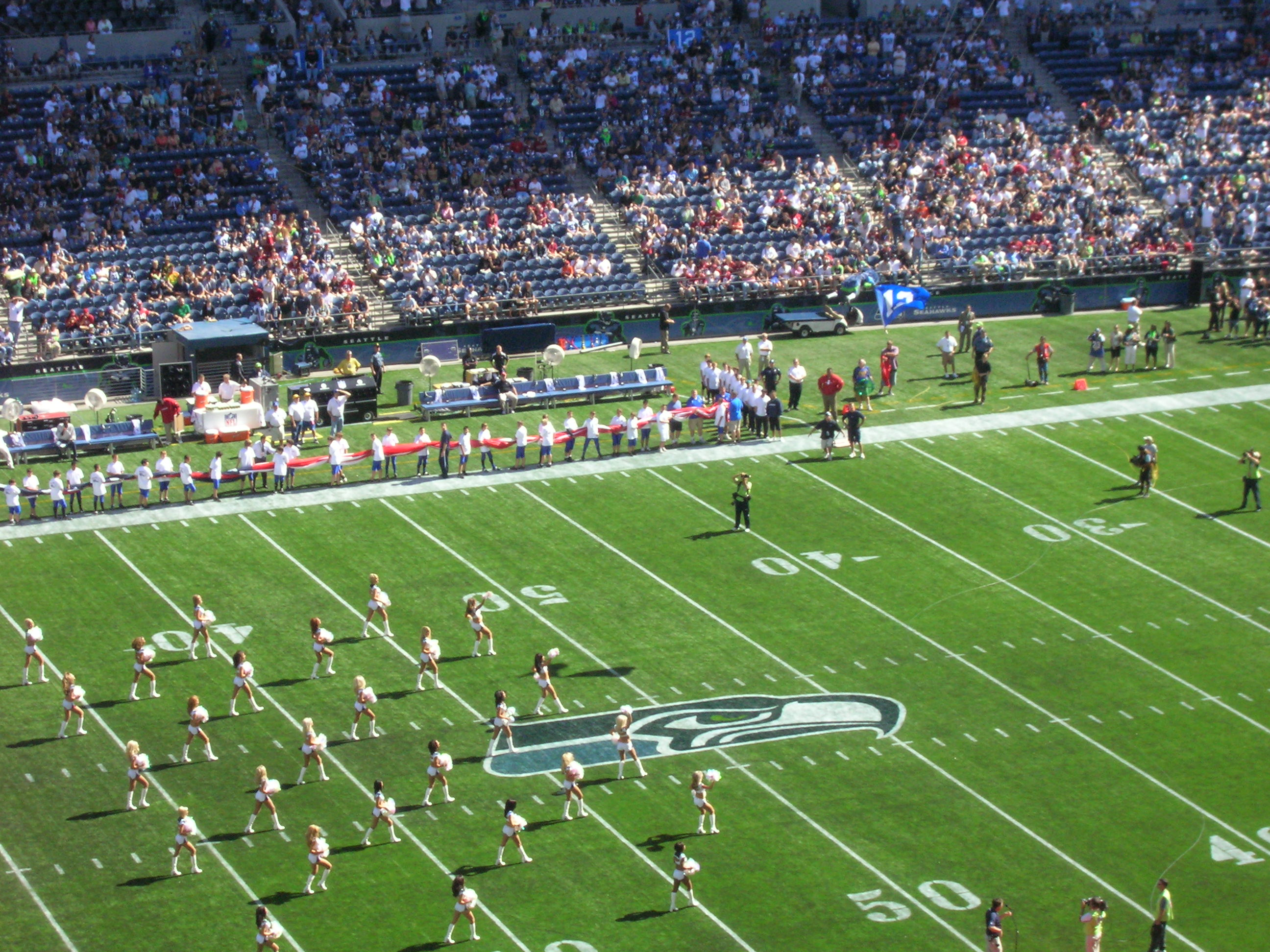
Sea Gals cheerleaders perform before the game

Hoping to rebound from their road loss to the Bills, the Seahawks played their Week 2 home opener their NFC West foe, the San Francisco 49ers. In the first quarter, the Seahawks running back Julius Jones got a 27-yard touchdown run, along with defensive tackle Craig Terrill returning a fumble 10 yards for a touchdown. The 49ers would reply with kicker Joe Nedney getting a 26-yard field goal. In the second quarter, Nedney gave San Francisco a 28-yard field goal. Seattle responded with kicker Olindo Mare getting a 51-yard field goal. The 49ers would hack away at the lead as quarterback J. T. O'Sullivan completed a 3-yard touchdown pass to wide receiver Bryant Johnson, yet the Seahawks closed out the half with Mare's 38-yard field goal.

In the third quarter, San Francisco took the lead with linebacker Patrick Willis returning an interception 86 yards for a touchdown, along with running back Frank Gore's 2-yard touchdown run. Seattle regained the lead as running back T. J. Duckett made a 1-yard touchdown run, along with Mare kicking a 32-yard field goal. However, the 49ers tied the game with Nedney's 28-yard field goal. In overtime, San Francisco's Nedney nailed the game-winning 40-yard field goal.

With the loss, the Seahawks fell to 0–2.

Julius Jones (26 carries for 127 yards and a touchdown) got his first 100-yard game since Week 14 of 2006.

==== Week 3: vs. St. Louis Rams ====
Week Three: Seattle Seahawks vs. St. Louis Rams – Game summary

Quarter	1	2	3	4	Total
Rams	0	6	7	0	13
Seahawks	17	10	0	10	37

at Qwest Field, Seattle

- Date: September 21
- Game time: 1:06 pm local
- Game weather: cloudy, 59 °F (15 °C), 77% humidity, wind SSW 5 miles per hour (8.0 km/h)
- Game attendance: 68,012
- Referee: Gene Steratore
- TV announcers (Fox): Matt Vasgersian, J. C. Pearson & Nischelle Turner
- Gamecenter, Gamebook

Game information

First quarter

- SEA – Olindo Mare 28-yard field goal, 11:19. Seahawks 3–0. Drive: 9 plays, 57 yards, 3:41.
- SEA – Michael Bumpus 10-yard pass from Matt Hasselbeck (Olindo Mare kick), 6:44. Seahawks 10–0. Drive: 6 plays, 24 yards, 3:11.
- SEA – Julius Jones 29-yard run (Olindo Mare kick), 1:16. Seahawks 17–0. Drive: 7 plays, 65 yards, 4:19.

Second quarter

- STL – Josh Brown 43-yard field goal, 13:26. Seahawks 17–3. Drive: 4 plays, -2 yards, 1:18.
- SEA – T. J. Duckett 4-yard run (Olindo Mare kick), 8:39. Seahawks 24–3. 'Drive: 11 plays, 83 yards, 4:47.
- STL – Josh Brown 29-yard field goal, 2:52. Seahawks 24–6. Drive: 12 plays, 60 yards, 5:47.
- SEA – Olindo Mare 38-yard field goal, 0:03. Seahawks 27–6. Drive: 4 plays, 54 yards, 1:01.

Third quarter

- STL – Dane Looker 21-yard pass from Marc Bulger (Josh Brown kick), 9:07. Seahawks 27–13. Drive: 10 plays, 80 yards, 5:53.

Fourth quarter

- SEA – T. J. Duckett 1-yard run (Olindo Mare kick), 8:39. Seahawks 34–13. Drive: 15 plays, 86 yards, 8:59.
- SEA – Olindo Mare 38-yard field goal, 4:46. Seahawks 37–13. Drive: 5 plays, 14 yards, 2:25.

Top passers

- STL – Marc Bulger: 18/31, 184 yds, 1 TD, 1 INT
- SEA – Matt Hasselbeck: 12/20, 172 yds, 1 TD

Top rushers

- STL – Steven Jackson: 23 car, 66 yds
- SEA – Julius Jones: 22 car, 140 yds, 1 TD

Top receivers

- STL – Steven Jackson: 5 rec, 62 yds
- SEA – Billy McMullen: 4 rec, 76 yds

Team – pass – rush – total – to

- STL – 175 – 65 – 240 – 2
- SEA – 162 – 245 – 407 – 1

The Seahawks stayed at home for a Week 3 NFC West duel with the St. Louis Rams. In the first quarter, Seattle's kicker Olindo Mare made a 28-yard field goal. The Seahawks continued their assault as quarterback Matt Hasselbeck completed a 10-yard touchdown pass to rookie wide receiver Michael Bumpus and running back Julius Jones getting a 29-yard touchdown run. In the second quarter, the Rams got on the board with former Seahawks kicker Olindo Mare getting a 43-yard field goal. Seattle would reply with running back T. J. Duckett getting a 4-yard touchdown run. St. Louis tried to rally as Brown kicked a 29-yard field goal, yet the Seahawks continued to increase their lead with Mare's 38-yard field goal.

In the third quarter, the Rams tried to come back as quarterback Marc Bulger completed a 21-yard touchdown pass to wide receiver Dane Looker. In the fourth quarter, Seattle flew away as Duckett got a 1-yard touchdown run and Mare nailed a 38-yard field goal.

With the win, the Seahawks entered their bye week at 1–2.

==== Week 5: at New York Giants ====
Week Five: Seattle Seahawks at New York Giants – Game summary

Quarter	1	2	3	4	Total
Seahawks	3	3	0	0	6
Giants	14	13	10	7	44

at Giants Stadium, East Rutherford, New Jersey

- Date: October 5
- Game time: 1:03pm local
- Game weather: cloudy, 60 °F (16 °C), 75% humidity, wind NNE 6 miles per hour (9.7 km/h)
- Game attendance: 79,529
- Referee: Alberto Riveron
- TV announcers (Fox): Kenny Albert, Daryl Johnston & Tony Siragusa
- Gamecenter, Gamebook

Game information

First quarter

- NYG – Domenik Hixon 32-yard pass from Eli Manning (John Carney kick), 11:21. Giants 7–0. Drive: 4 plays, 91 yards, 2:14.
- SEA – Olindo Mare 30-yard field goal, 7:09. Giants 7–3. Drive: 10 plays, 56 yards, 4:12.
- NYG – Brandon Jacobs 3-yard run (John Carney kick), 3:39. Giants 14–3. Drive: 6 plays, 75 yards, 3:30.

Second quarter

- NYG – John Carney 29-yard field goal, 14:50. Giants 17–3. Drive: 5 plays, 48 yards, 2:14.
- NYG – Brandon Jacobs 1-yard run (John Carney kick), 7:23. Giants 24–3. Drive: 11 plays, 73 yards, 6:24.
- NYG – John Carney 33-yard field goal, 0:47. Giants 27–3. Drive: 10 plays, 60 yards, 4:11.
- SEA – Olindo Mare 29-yard field goal, 0:03. Giants 27–6. Drive: 6 plays, 49 yards, 0:44.

Third quarter

- NYG – Sinorice Moss 23-yard pass from Eli Manning (John Carney kick), 11:58. Giants 34–6. Drive: 6 plays, 80 yards, 3:02.
- NYG – John Carney 35-yard field goal, 1:38. Giants 37–6. Drive: 7 plays, 14 yards, 4:16.

Fourth quarter

- NYG – Sinorice Moss 5-yard pass from David Carr (John Carney kick), 9:25. Giants 44–6. Drive: 7 plays, 77 yards, 4:16.

Top passers

- SEA – Matt Hasselbeck: 11/21, 105 yds, 1 INT
- NYG – Eli Manning: 19/25, 267 yds, 2 TD

Top rushers

- SEA – Julius Jones: 17 car, 61 yds
- NYG – Brandon Jacobs: 15 car, 136 yds, 2 TD

Top receivers

- SEA – Bobby Engram: 8 rec, 61 yds
- NYG – Domenik Hixon: 4 rec, 102 yds, 1 TD

Team – pass – rush – total – to

- SEA – 113 – 74 – 187 – 1
- NYG – 269 – 254 – 523 – 0

Coming off their bye week, the Seahawks flew to Giants Stadium for a Week 5 duel with the defending Super Bowl champions, the New York Giants. In the first quarter, Seattle trailed early as quarterback Eli Manning completed a 32-yard touchdown pass to wide receiver Domenik Hixon. The Seahawks responded with kicker Olindo Mare completing a 30-yard field goal, yet New York answered with running back Brandon Jacobs getting a 3-yard touchdown run. In the second quarter, the Giants increased their lead with kicker John Carney getting a 29-yard field goal, Jacobs getting a 1-yard touchdown run, and Carney making a 33-yard field goal. Seattle closed out the half with Mare kicking a 29-yard field goal.

In the third quarter, New York pulled away as Manning completed a 23-yard touchdown pass to wide receiver Sinorice Moss, along with Carney nailing a 35-yard field goal. In the fourth quarter, the Giants sealed the win as quarterback David Carr completed a 5-yard touchdown pass to Moss.

With the loss, the Seahawks fell to 1–3.

==== Week 6: vs. Green Bay Packers ====
Week Six: Seattle Seahawks vs. Green Bay Packers – Game summary

Quarter	1	2	3	4	Total
Packers	3	7	7	10	27
Seahawks	0	10	0	7	17

at Qwest Field, Seattle

- Date: October 12
- Game time: 1:16 pm local
- Game weather: clear, 56 °F (13 °C), 52% humidity, wind calm
- Game attendance: 68,302
- Referee: Jeff Triplette
- TV announcers (Fox): Chris Rose, J. C. Pearson & Nischelle Turner
- Gamecenter, Gamebook

Game information

First quarter

- GB – Mason Crosby 29-yard field goal, 2:25. Packers 3–0. Drive: 11 plays, 43 yards, 5:50.

Second quarter

- SEA – Olindo Mare 50-yard field goal, 13:05. Tied 3–3. Drive: 10 plays, 35 yards, 4:20.
- SEA – John Carlson 6-yard pass from Charlie Frye (Olindo Mare kick), 8:17. Seahawks 10–3. Drive: 7 plays, 32 yards, 3:25.
- GB – Aaron Rodgers 1-yard run (Mason Crosby kick), 1:08. Tied 10–10. Drive: 13 plays, 66 yards, 7:09.

Third quarter

- GB – Greg Jennings 45-yard pass from Aaron Rodgers (Mason Crosby kick), 5:56. Packers 17–10. Drive: 3 plays, 49 yards, 1:28.

Fourth quarter

- GB – John Kuhn 1-yard pass from Aaron Rodgers (Mason Crosby kick), 11:23. Packers 24–10. Drive: 15 plays, 84 yards, 7:52.
- GB – Mason Crosby 51-yard field goal, 8:41. Packers 27–10. Drive: 4 plays, 0 yards, 1:45.
- SEA – Keary Colbert 5-yard pass from Charlie Frye (Olindo Mare kick), 3:14. Packers 27–17. Drive: 9 plays, 72 yards, 2:01.

Top passers

- GB – Aaron Rodgers: 21/30, 208 yds, 2 TD
- SEA – Charlie Frye: 12/23, 83 yds, 2 TD, 2 INT

Top rushers

- GB – Ryan Grant: 33 car, 90 yds
- SEA – Julius Jones: 12 car, 44 yds

Top receivers

- GB – Greg Jennings: 5 rec, 84 yds, 1 TD
- SEA – Koren Robinson: 2 rec, 23 yds

Team – pass – rush – total – to

- GB – 200 – 113 – 313 – 1
- SEA – 64 – 113 – 177 – 2

Hoping to rebound from their blowout road loss to the Giants, the Seahawks returned home for a Week 6 duel with the Green Bay Packers, as head coach Mike Holmgren faced his former team for the last time. Also, quarterback Seneca Wallace was unable to play due to a knee injury he suffered from last week. Quarterback Charlie Frye was given the start.

In the first quarter, Seattle trailed early as Packers kicker Mason Crosby got a 29-yard field goal. In the second quarter, the Seahawks took the lead as kicker Olindo Mare got a 50-yard field goal, while Frye completed a 6-yard touchdown pass to rookie tight end John Carlson. Green Bay tied the game as quarterback Aaron Rodgers got a 1-yard touchdown run.

In the third quarter, the Packers regained the lead as Rodgers completed a 45-yard touchdown pass to wide receiver Greg Jennings. In the fourth quarter, Green Bay pulled away as Rodgers completed a 1-yard touchdown pass to fullback John Kuhn, along with Crosby nailing a 51-yard field goal. Seattle tried to come back as Frye completed a 5-yard touchdown pass to wide receiver Keary Colbert, but the Packers' defense was too much.

With the loss, the Seahawks fell to 1–4.

==== Week 7: at Tampa Bay Buccaneers ====
Week Seven: Seattle Seahawks at Tampa Bay Buccaneers – Game summary

Quarter	1	2	3	4	Total
Seahawks	0	0	3	7	10
Buccaneers	7	10	0	3	20

at Raymond James Stadium, Tampa, Florida

- Date: October 19
- Game time: 8:23pm local
- Game weather: clear, 75 °F (24 °C), 48% humidity, wind NNE 13 miles per hour (21 km/h)
- Game attendance: 64,811
- Referee: Scott Green
- TV announcers (NBC): Al Michaels, Cris Collinsworth & Andrea Kremer
- Gamecenter, Gamebook

Game information

First quarter

- TB – Antonio Bryant 47-yard pass from Jeff Garcia (Matt Bryant kick), 9:13. Buccaneers 7–0. Drive: 6 plays, 63 yards, 2:44.

Second quarter

- TB – Earnest Graham 1-yard run (Matt Bryant kick), 6:32. Buccaneers 14–0. Drive: 6 plays, 59 yards, 3:36.
- TB – Matt Bryant 27-yard field goal, 3:12. Buccaneers 17–0. Drive: 5 plays, 25 yards, 2:54.

Third quarter

- SEA – Olindo Mare 26-yard field goal, 10:21. Buccaneers 17–3. Drive: 6 plays, 17 yards, 2:11.

Fourth quarter

- TB – Matt Bryant 27-yard field goal, 4:34. Buccaneers 20–3. Drive: 16 plays, 67 yards, 9:34.
- SEA – John Carlson 2-yard pass from Seneca Wallace (Olindo Mare kick), 1:55. Buccaneers 20–10. Drive: 8 plays, 50 yards, 2:39.

Top passers

- SEA – Seneca Wallace: 12/23, 73 yds, 1 TD, 1 INT
- TB – Jeff Garcia: 27/36, 310 yds, 1 TD

Top rushers

- SEA – Maurice Morris: 6 car, 56 yds
- TB – Earnest Graham: 23 car, 52 yds, 1 TD

Top receivers

- SEA – Koren Robinson: 2 rec, 23 yds
- TB – Antonio Bryant: 6 rec, 115 yds, 1 TD

Team – pass – rush – total – to

- SEA – 73 – 103 – 176 – 2
- TB – 305 – 97 – 402 – 1

Hoping to snap a two-game losing streak, the Seahawks flew to Raymond James Stadium for a Week 7 Sunday night duel with their 1976 expansion rival, the Tampa Bay Buccaneers. With quarterback Matt Hasselbeck recovering from an injured knee, back-up Seneca Wallace was given the start.

In the first quarter, Seattle trailed early as Buccaneers quarterback Jeff Garcia completed a 47-yard touchdown pass to tight end Antonio Bryant. In the second quarter, Tampa Bay increased their lead as running back Earnest Graham got a 1-yard touchdown run, along with kicker Matt Bryant getting a 27-yard field goal. In the third quarter, the Seahawks got on the board as kicker Olindo Mare got a 26-yard field goal. In the fourth quarter, the Buccaneers sailed away as Bryant nailed a 27-yard field goal. Seattle ended the game's scoring as Wallace completed a 2-yard touchdown pass to rookie tight end John Carlson.

With the loss, not only did the Seahawks fall to 1–5, but they also suffered their first-ever loss at Tampa Bay.

==== Week 8: at San Francisco 49ers ====
Week Eight: Seattle Seahawks at San Francisco 49ers – Game summary

Quarter	1	2	3	4	Total
Seahawks	6	14	7	7	34
49ers	0	3	3	7	13

at Candlestick Park, San Francisco

- Date: October 26
- Game time: 1:15pm local
- Game weather: clear, 64 °F (18 °C), 70% humidity, wind NE 3 miles per hour (4.8 km/h)
- Game attendance: 67,504
- Referee: Terry McAulay
- TV announcers (Fox): Ron Pitts, Tony Boselli & Danyelle Sargent
- Gamecenter, Gamebook

Game information

First quarter

- SEA – Olindo Mare 43-yard field goal, 9:58. Seahawks 3–0. Drive: 9 plays, 41 yards, 2:59.
- SEA – Olindo Mare 42-yard field goal, 6:10. Seahawks 6–0. Drive: 4 plays, 3 yards, 0:56.

Second quarter

- SEA – T. J. Duckett 1-yard run (Olindo Mare kick), 12:01. Seahawks 13–0. Drive: 14 plays, 63 yards, 7:32.
- SF – Joe Nedney 42-yard field goal, 7:05. Seahawks 13–3. Drive: 10 plays, 41 yards, 4:56.
- SEA – Josh Wilson 75-yard interception return (Olindo Mare kick), 0:31. Seahawks 20–3.

Third quarter

- SF – Joe Nedney 40-yard field goal, 4:12. Seahawks 20–6. Drive: 14 plays, 56 yards, 7:22.
- SEA – Leonard Weaver 43-yard pass from Seneca Wallace (Olindo Mare kick), 1:50. Seahawks 27–6. Drive: 5 plays, 60 yards, 2:22.

Fourth quarter

- SF – Jason Hill 2-yard pass from Shaun Hill (Joe Nedney kick), 9:57. Seahawks 27–13. Drive: 15 plays, 62 yards, 6:53.
- SEA – Leonard Weaver 62-yard pass from Seneca Wallace (Olindo Mare kick), 6:10. Seahawks 34–13. Drive: 6 plays, 80 yards, 3:47.

Top passers

- SEA – Seneca Wallace: 15/25, 222 yds, 2 TD
- SF – Shaun Hill: 15/23, 173 yds, 1 TD

Top rushers

- SEA – Leonard Weaver: 2 car, 13 yds
- SF – Frank Gore: 18 car, 94 yds

Top receivers

- SEA – Leonard Weaver: 4 rec, 116 yds, 2 TD
- SF – Frank Gore: 7 rec, 54 yds

Team – pass – rush – total – to

- SEA – 222 – 39 – 261 – 0
- SF – 264 – 124 – 388 – 2

Trying to snap a three-game losing streak, the Seahawks flew to Bill Walsh Field at Candlestick Park for a Week 8 NFC West rematch with the San Francisco 49ers. In the first quarter, the Seahawks took flight as kicker Olindo Mare got a 43-yard and a 42-yard field goal. In the second quarter, Seattle increased its lead with running back T. J. Duckett getting a 1-yard touchdown run. The 49ers responded with kicker Joe Nedney getting a 42-yard field goal. The Seahawks closed out the half as cornerback Josh Wilson returned an interception 75 yards for a touchdown.

In the third quarter, San Francisco responded with Nedney making a 40-yard field goal, yet Seattle responded with quarterback Seneca Wallace completing a 43-yard touchdown pass to fullback Leonard Weaver. In the fourth quarter, the 49ers tried to rally as quarterback Shaun Hill completed a 2-yard touchdown pass to wide receiver Jason Hill, yet the Seahawks pulled away as Wallace hooked up with Weaver on a 62-yard touchdown pass.

With the win, the Seahawks improved to 2–5.

==== Week 9: vs. Philadelphia Eagles ====
Week Nine: Seattle Seahawks vs. Philadelphia Eagles – Game summary

Quarter	1	2	3	4	Total
Eagles	0	14	6	6	26
Seahawks	7	0	0	0	7

at Qwest Field, Seattle

- Date: November 2
- Game time: 1:16 pm local
- Game weather: showers, 58 °F (14 °C), 71% humidity, wind SSE 13 miles per hour (21 km/h)
- Game attendance: 68,055
- Referee: Mike Carey
- TV announcers (Fox): Dick Stockton, Brian Baldinger & Laura Okmin
- Gamecenter, Gamebook

Game information

First quarter

- SEA – Koren Robinson 90-yard pass from Seneca Wallace (Olindo Mare kick), 13:11. Seahawks 7–0. Drive: 1 play, 90 yards, 0:15.

Second quarter

- PHI – Reggie Brown 22-yard pass from Donovan McNabb (David Akers kick), 6:33. Tied 7–7. Drive: 6 plays, 80 yards, 4:18.
- PHI – Todd Herremans 1-yard pass from Donovan McNabb (David Akers kick), 0:40. Eagles 14–7. Drive: 11 plays, 55 yards, 4:42.

Third quarter

- PHI – David Akers 39-yard field goal, 11:25. Eagles 17–7. Drive: 6 plays, 37 yards, 2:15.
- PHI – David Akers 24-yard field goal, 1:26. Eagles 20–7. Drive: 10 plays, 69 yards, 6:23.

Fourth quarter

- PHI – David Akers 42-yard field goal, 9:27. Eagles 23–7. Drive: 11 plays, 55 yards, 5:19.
- PHI – David Akers 39-yard field goal, 4:35. Eagles 26–7. Drive: 8 plays, 46 yards, 3:49.

Top passers

- PHI – Donovan McNabb: 28/43, 349 yds, 2 TD, 1 INT
- SEA – Seneca Wallace: 13/29, 169 yds, 1 TD

Top rushers

- PHI – Brian Westbrook: 20 car, 61 yds
- SEA – Maurice Morris: 8 car, 43 yds

Top receivers

- PHI – Brent Celek: 6 rec, 131 yds
- SEA – Koren Robinson: 4 rec, 105 yds, 1 TD

Team – pass – rush – total – to

- PHI – 347 – 72 – 419 – 1
- SEA – 147 – 86 – 233 – 0

Coming off their divisional road win over the 49ers, the Seahawks went home for a Week 9 duel with the Philadelphia Eagles. In the first quarter, the Seahawks immediately took flight as quarterback Seneca Wallace completed a franchise-long 90-yard touchdown pass to wide receiver Koren Robinson. In the second quarter, the Eagles took the lead as quarterback Donovan McNabb completed a 22-yard touchdown pass to wide receiver Reggie Brown and a 1-yard touchdown pass to Todd Herremans.

In the third quarter, Philadelphia continued its domination as kicker David Akers got a 39-yard and a 24-yard field goal. In the fourth quarter, the Eagles flew away as Akers nailed a 42-yard and a 39-yard field goal.

With the loss, the Seahawks fell to 2–6. As of 2024, this is their most recent loss to Philadelphia.

==== Week 10: at Miami Dolphins ====
Week Ten: Seattle Seahawks at Miami Dolphins – Game summary

Quarter	1	2	3	4	Total
Seahawks	0	7	6	6	19
Dolphins	7	7	0	7	21

at Dolphin Stadium, Miami Gardens, Florida

- Date: November 9
- Game time: 1:03pm local
- Game weather: partly cloudy, 78 °F (26 °C), 71% humidity, wind NNE 15 miles per hour (24 km/h)
- Game attendance: 64,862
- Referee: Pete Morelli
- TV announcers (Fox): Sam Rosen, Tim Ryan & Chris Myers
- Gamecenter, Gamebook

Game information

First quarter

- MIA – Ted Ginn Jr. 39-yard pass from Chad Pennington (Dan Carpenter kick), 8:50. Dolphins 7–0. Drive: 11 plays, 90 yards, 6:10.

Second quarter

- MIA – Ricky Williams 51-yard run (Dan Carpenter kick), 14:52. Dolphins 14–0. Drive: 6 plays, 76 yards, 2:59.
- SEA – Jordan Babineaux 35-yard interception return (Olindo Mare kick), 8:21. Dolphins 14–7.

Third quarter

- SEA – Olindo Mare 37-yard field goal, 11:06. Dolphins 14–10. Drive: 9 plays, 31 yards, 3:54.
- SEA – Olindo Mare 27-yard field goal, 3:31. Dolphins 14–13. Drive: 9 plays, 48 yards, 4:14.

Fourth quarter

- MIA – Ricky Williams 16-yard run (Dan Carpenter kick), 5:38. Dolphins 21–13. Drive: 16 plays, 79 yards, 9:06.
- SEA – Koren Robinson 3-yard pass from Seneca Wallace (pass failed), 2:57. Dolphins 21–19. Drive: 6 plays, 55 yards, 2:41.

Top passers

- MIA – Chad Pennington: 21/38, 185 yds, 1 TD
- SEA – Seneca Wallace: 22/36, 209 yds, 1 TD, 1 INT

Top rushers

- MIA – Ricky Williams: 16 car, 88 yds
- SEA – Julius Jones: 12 car, 105 yds, 1 TD

Top receivers

- MIA – Ted Ginn Jr.: 5 rec, 63 yds
- SEA – Bobby Engram: 4 rec, 67 yds, 1 TD

Team – pass – rush – total – to

- MIA – 172 – 126 – 298 – 0
- SEA – 206 – 155 – 361 – 1

The Seahawks flew to Dolphin Stadium for a Week 10 interconference duel with the Miami Dolphins. In the first quarter, Seattle trailed early as Dolphins quarterback Chad Pennington completed a 39-yard touchdown pass to wide receiver Ted Ginn Jr. In the second quarter, the Seahawks continued to trail as Miami unleashed another play from the infamous "Wildcat Offense", with running back Ronnie Brown handing the ball off to running back Ricky Williams, who then took the ball 51 yards for a touchdown. Seattle responded as defensive back Jordan Babineaux returned an interception 35 yards for a touchdown.

In the third quarter, the Seahawks drew closer as former Dolphins kicker Olindo Mare nailed a 37-yard and a 27-yard field goal. In the fourth quarter, the Dolphins answered with Brown getting a 16-yard touchdown run. Seattle tried to come back as quarterback Seneca Wallace completed a 3-yard touchdown pass to wide receiver Koren Robinson. However, Miami's defense prevented Wallace's 2-point conversion pass from working.

With the loss, the Seahawks fell to 2–7.

==== Week 11: vs. Arizona Cardinals ====
Week Eleven: Seattle Seahawks vs. Arizona Cardinals – Game summary

Quarter	1	2	3	4	Total
Cardinals	10	6	10	0	26
Seahawks	0	7	0	13	20

at Qwest Field, Seattle

- Date: November 16
- Game time: 1:06 pm local
- Game weather: clear, 52 °F (11 °C), 85% humidity, wind SSW 3 miles per hour (4.8 km/h)
- Game attendance: 67,616
- Referee: Bill Carollo
- TV announcers (Fox): Dick Stockton, Brian Baldinger & Laura Okmin
- Gamecenter, Gamebook

Game information

First quarter

- ARI – Neil Rackers 38-yard field goal, 7:47. Cardinals 3–0. Drive: 13 plays, 60 yards, 6:13.
- ARI – J. J. Arrington 4-yard run (Neil Rackers kick), 0:04. Cardinals 10–0. Drive: 7 plays, 89 yards, 3:36.

Second quarter

- ARI – Neil Rackers 48-yard field goal, 4:34. Cardinals 13–0. Drive: 10 plays, 65 yards, 4:56.
- SEA – Maurice Morris 13-yard pass from Matt Hasselbeck (Olindo Mare kick), 0:57. Cardinals 13–7. Drive: 3 plays, 19 yards, 0:47.
- ARI – Neil Rackers 54-yard field goal, 0:00. Cardinals 16–7. Drive: 6 plays, 27 yards, 0:57.

Third quarter

- ARI – Neil Rackers 26-yard field goal, 9:36. Cardinals 19–7. Drive: 7 plays, 59 yards, 3:14.
- ARI – Larry J. J. Arrington 6-yard pass from Kurt Warner (Neil Rackers kick), 1:55. Cardinals 26–7. Drive: 10 plays, 82 yards, 4:50.

Fourth quarter

- SEA – T. J. Duckett 1-yard run (pass failed), 12:46. Cardinals 26–13. Drive: 5 plays, 11 yards, 2:01.
- SEA – T. J. Duckett 2-yard run (Olindo Mare kick), 9:41. Cardinals 26–20. Drive: 5 plays, 14 yards, 2:51.

Top passers

- ARI – Kurt Warner: 32/44, 395 yds, 1 TD, 1 INT
- SEA – Matt Hasselbeck: 17/29, 170 yds, 1 TD, 3 INT

Top rushers

- ARI – J. J. Arrington: 8 car, 40 yds, 1 TD
- SEA – Julius Jones: 10 car, 19 yds

Top receivers

- ARI – Anquan Boldin: 13 rec, 186 yds
- SEA – Deion Branch: 4 rec, 54 yds

Team – pass – rush – total – to

- ARI – 382 – 76 – 458 – 3
- SEA – 153 – 43 – 196 – 4

Trying to snap a two-game skid, the Seahawks went home for a Week 11 NFC West duel with the Arizona Cardinals. For this game, quarterback Matt Hasselbeck finally recovered from his knee injury and was able to reclaim his starting role.

In the first quarter, Seattle trailed early as Cardinals kicker Neil Rackers made a 38-yard field goal, along with running back J. J. Arrington getting a 4-yard touchdown run. In the second quarter, Arizona increased their lead as Rackers got a 48-yard field goal. The Seahawks got on the board as Hasselbeck completed a 13-yard touchdown pass to running back Maurice Morris. The Cardinals closed out the half with Rackers making a 54-yard field goal.

In the third quarter, Arizona increased its lead as Rackers nailed a 26-yard field goal, along with Warner completing a 6-yard touchdown pass to Arrington. Seattle tried to rally as running back T. J. Duckett got a 1-yard (with a failed 2-point conversion) and a 2-yard touchdown run. However, the Cardinals' defense prevented any possible comeback.

With the loss, the Seahawks fell to 2–8.

==== Week 12: vs. Washington Redskins ====
Week Twelve: Seattle Seahawks vs. Washington Redskins – Game summary

Quarter	1	2	3	4	Total
Redskins	0	7	10	3	20
Seahawks	3	7	0	7	17

at Qwest Field, Seattle

- Date: November 23
- Game time: 1:16 pm local
- Game weather: clear, 49 °F (9 °C), 60% humidity, wind ENE 4 miles per hour (6.4 km/h)
- Game attendance: 67,771
- Referee: Scott Green
- TV announcers (Fox): Matt Vasgersian, J.C. Pearson & Nischelle Turner
- Gamecenter, Gamebook

Game information

First quarter

- SEA – Olindo Mare 45-yard field goal, 7:19. Seahawks 3–0. Drive: 5 plays, 34 yards, 1:20.

Second quarter

- WAS – Ladell Betts 1-yard run (Shaun Suisham kick), 4:32. Redskins 7–3. Drive: 11 plays, 62 tards, 5:42.
- SEA – Maurice Morris 4-yard pass from Matt Hasselbeck (Olindo Mare kick), 0:29. Seahawks 10–7. Drive: 9 plays, 72 yards, 4:03.

Third quarter

- WAS – Shaun Suisham 26-yard field goal, 7:21. Tied 10–10. Drive: 11 plays, 49 yards, 5:36.
- WAS – Antwaan Randle El 8-yard pass from Jason Campbell (Shaun Suisham kick), 3:25. Redskins 17–10. Drive: 3 plays, 35 yards, 1:47.

Fourth quarter

- SEA – John Carlson 10-yard pass from Matt Hasselbeck (Olindo Mare kick), 13:24. Tied 17–17. Drive: 10 plays, 62 yards, 5:01.
- WAS – Shaun Suisham 22-yard field goal, 9:19. Redskins 20–17. Drive: 10 plays, 64 yards, 4:05.

Top passers

- WAS – Jason Campbell: 20/33, 206 yds, 1 TD
- SEA – Matt Hasselbeck: 12/24, 103 yds, 2 TD, 2 INT

Top rushers

- WAS – Clinton Portis: 29 car, 143 yds
- SEA – Maurice Morris: 14 car, 103 yds

Top receivers

- WAS – Santana Moss: 4 rec, 72 yds
- SEA – Bobby Engram: 2 rec, 34 yds

Team – pass – rush – total – to

- WAS – 199 – 187 – 386 – 1
- SEA – 89 – 139 – 228 – 2

Trying to snap a three-game losing streak, the Seahawks stayed at home for a Week 12 duel with the Washington Redskins, headed by former Seahawks quarterback/assistant coach Jim Zorn.

In the first quarter, Seattle took flight as kicker Olindo Mare got a 45-yard field goal. In the second quarter, the Redskins took the lead with running back Ladell Betts getting a 1-yard touchdown run. The Seahawks got the lead again prior to halftime as quarterback Matt Hasselbeck completed a 4-yard touchdown pass to running back Maurice Morris.

In the third quarter, Washington retook the lead as kicker Shaun Suisham made a 26-yard field goal, while quarterback Jason Campbell completed an 8-yard touchdown pass to wide receiver Antwaan Randle El. In the fourth quarter, Seattle tried to come back as Hasselbeck completed a 10-yard touchdown pass to rookie tight end John Carlson. However, the Redskins retook with Suisham nailing a 22-yard field goal. The Seahawks tried to get one final rally, but a Shawn Springs interception ended any hope of a comeback.

With the loss, Seattle fell to 2–9.

==== Week 13: at Dallas Cowboys ====
Week Thirteen: Seattle Seahawks at Dallas Cowboys – Game summary

Quarter	1	2	3	4	Total
Seahawks	3	3	3	0	9
Cowboys	14	10	7	3	34

at Texas Stadium, Irving, Texas

- Date: November 27
- Game time: 3:17pm local
- Game weather: 69 °F (21 °C), 32% humidity, wind calm
- Game attendance: 63,253
- Referee: John Parry
- TV announcers (Fox): Joe Buck, Troy Aikman & Pam Oliver
- Gamecenter, Gamebook

Game information

First quarter

- DAL – Martellus Bennett 16-yard pass from Tony Romo (Nick Folk kick), 12:36. Cowboys 7–0. Drive: 5 plays, 71 yards, 2:24.
- DAL – Marion Barber 2-yard run (Nick Folk kick), 4:50. Cowboys 14–0. Drive: 9 plays, 72 yards, 4:59.
- SEA – Olindo Mare 44-yard field goal, 0:52. Cowboys 14–3. Drive: 8 plays, 43 yards, 3:58.

Second quarter

- DAL – Jason Witten 7-yard pass from Tony Romo (Nick Folk kick), 11:57. Cowboys 21–3. Drive: 8 plays, 80 yards, 3:55.
- DAL – Nick Folk 41-yard field goal, 7:34. Cowboys 24–3. Drive: 5 plays, 57 yards, 1:56.
- SEA – Olindo Mare 38-yard field goal, 1:31. Cowboys 24–6. Drive: 7 plays, 39 yards, 1:30.

Third quarter

- SEA – Olindo Mare 25-yard field goal, 9:37. Cowboys 24–9. Drive: 13 plays, 69 yards, 5:23.
- DAL – Terrell Owens 19-yard pass from Tony Romo (Nick Folk kick), 2:19. Cowboys 31–9. Drive: 4 plays, 56 yards, 1:10.

Fourth quarter

- DAL – Nick Folk 42-yard field goal, 8:54. Cowboys 34–9. Drive: 10 plays, 71 yards, 6:14.

Top passers

- SEA – Matt Hasselbeck: 22/38, 287 yds, 1 INT
- DAL – Tony Romo: 22/34, 331 yds, 3 TD, 1 INT

Top rushers

- SEA – Julius Jones: 11 car, 37 yds
- DAL – Tashard Choice: 11 car, 57 yds

Top receivers

- SEA – John Carlson: 6 rec, 105 yds
- DAL – Jason Witten: 9 rec, 115 yds, 1 TD

Team – pass – rush – total – to

- SEA – 242 – 80 – 322 – 2
- DAL – 331 – 116 – 447 – 1

Trying to snap a four-game losing streak, the Seahawks flew to Texas Stadium for a Week 13 Thanksgiving duel with the Dallas Cowboys. In the first quarter, Seattle trailed early as Cowboys quarterback Tony Romo completed a 16-yard TD pass to tight end Martellus Bennett, along with running back Marion Barber getting a 2-yard touchdown run. The Seahawks would respond with kicker Olindo Mare getting a 44-yard field goal. In the second quarter, Dallas answered with Romo completing a 7-yard touchdown pass to tight end Jason Witten, while Folk got a 41-yard field goal. Seattle would close out the half with Mare making a 38-yard field goal.

In the third quarter, the Seahawks tried to rally as Mare made a 25-yard field goal. The Cowboys replied with Romo completing a 19-yard touchdown pass to wide receiver Terrell Owens. In the fourth quarter, Dallas closed out the game with Folk nailing a 42-yard field goal.

With the loss, Seattle fell to 2–10.

This would prove to be the final game in the career of Seahawks legend Walter Jones.

==== Week 14: vs. New England Patriots ====
Week Fourteen: Seattle Seahawks vs. New England Patriots – Game summary

Quarter	1	2	3	4	Total
Patriots	3	7	3	11	24
Seahawks	7	7	7	0	21

at Qwest Field, Seattle

- Date: December 7
- Game time: 1:06pm local
- Game weather: cloudy, 50 °F (10 °C), 86% humidity, wind S 3 miles per hour (4.8 km/h)
- Game attendance: 68,077
- Referee: Carl Cheffers
- TV announcers (CBS): Dick Enberg & Randy Cross
- Gamecenter, Gamebook

Game information

First quarter

- SEA – Deion Branch 14-yard pass from Seneca Wallace (Olindo Mare kick), 5:25. Seahawks 7–0. Drive: 13 plays, 87 yards, 6:35.
- NE – Stephen Gostkowski 50-yard field goal, 0:48. Seahawks 7–3. Drive: 9 plays, 48 yards, 4:37.

Second quarter

- SEA – John Carlson 10-yard pass from Seneca Wallace (Olindo Mare kick), 12:30. Seahawks 14–3. Drive: 9 plays, 74 yards, 3:18.
- NE – Ben Watson 2-yard pass from Matt Cassel (Stephen Gostkowski kick), 9:09. Seahawks 14–10. Drive: 6 plays, 43 yards, 3:21.

Third quarter

- NE – Stephen Gostkowski 42-yard field goal, 2:40. Seahawks 14–13. Drive: 12 plays, 56 yards, 4:43.
- SEA – Deion Branch 4-yard pass from Seneca Wallace (Olindo Mare kick), 0:41. Seahawks 21–13. Drive: 3 plays, 62 yards, 1:59.

Fourth quarter

- NE – Stephen Gostkowski 27-yard field goal, 12:19. Seahawks 21–16. Drive: 10 plays, 68 yards, 3:22.
- NE – Sammy Morris 1-yard run (Wes Welker pass from Matt Cassel), 2:44. Patriots 24–21. Drive: 14 plays, 71 yards, 6:03.

Top passers

- NE – Matt Cassel: 26/44, 268 yds, 1 TD
- SEA – Seneca Wallace: 20/28, 212 yds, 3 TD

Top rushers

- NE – Sammy Morris: 11 car, 36 yds, 1 TD
- SEA – Seneca Wallace: 3 car, 47 yds

Top receivers

- NE – Wes Welker: 12 rec, 134 yds
- SEA – Deion Branch: 4 rec, 88 yds, 2 TD

Team – pass – rush – total – to

- NE – 260 – 84 – 344 – 0
- SEA – 205 – 134 – 339 – 1

This was Seattle's first home game against the Patriots since 1993.

==== Week 15: at St. Louis Rams ====
Week Fifteen: Seattle Seahawks at St. Louis Rams – Game summary

Quarter	1	2	3	4	Total
Seahawks	7	0	6	10	23
Rams	7	10	0	3	20

at Edward Jones Dome, St. Louis, Missouri

- Date: December 14
- Game time: 12:02pm local
- Game weather: indoors
- Game attendance: 56,123
- Referee: Ed Hochuli
- TV announcers (Fox): Matt Vasgersian, J.C. Pearson & Nischelle Turner
- Gamecenter, Gamebook

Game information

First quarter

- STL – Torry Holt 31-yard pass from Marc Bulger (Josh Brown kick), 10:11. Rams 7–0. Drive: 9 plays, 77 yards, 4:49.
- SEA – Jordan Babineaux 24-yard defensive fumble return (Olindo Mare kick), 6:39. Tied 7–7.

Second quarter

- STL – Steven Jackson 6-yard run (Josh Brown kick), 6:41. Rams 14–7. Drive: 18 plays, 97 yards, 8:33.
- STL – Josh Brown 36-yard field goal, 3:47. Rams 17–7. Drive: 4 plays, 4 yards, 0:55.

Third quarter

- SEA – Olindo Mare 28-yard field goal, 9:53. Rams 17–10. Drive: 11 plays, 56 yards, 5:07.
- SEA – Olindo Mare 50-yard field goal, 3:45. Rams 17–13. Drive: 8 plays, 45 yards, 2:46.

Fourth quarter

- STL – Josh Brown 48-yard field goal, 11:04. Rams 20–13. Drive: 13 plays, 51 yards, 8:31.
- SEA – T. J. Duckett 1-yard run (Olindo Mare kick), 2:47. Tied 20–20. Drive: 10 plays, 80 yards, 5:09.
- SEA – Olindo Mare 27-yard field goal, 0:00. Seahawks 23–20. Drive: 6 plays, 60 yards, 2:10.

Top passers

- SEA – Seneca Wallace: 15/25, 226 yds
- STL – Marc Bulger: 19/32, 207 yds, 1 TD

Top rushers

- SEA – Maurice Morris: 15 car, 86 yds
- STL – Steven Jackson: 24 car, 91 yds, 1 TD

Top receivers

- SEA – Deion Branch: 5 rec, 76 yds
- SEA – John Carlson: 5 rec, 76 yds
- STL – Torry Holt: 4 rec, 64 yds, 1 TD

Team – pass – rush – total – to

- SEA – 208 – 125 – 333 – 2
- STL – 211 – 131 – 342 – 2

The Rams played a solid 1st half but the Seahawks turned the tables with 10 points in the final 2:47 for a 23–20 victory Sunday. T. J. Duckett's 1-yard run tied it, the Rams fizzled while going three-and-out, and Olindo Mare's 27-yard field goal as time expired ended the Seahawks' six-game losing streak and extended the Rams' losing streak to 8.

==== Week 16: vs. New York Jets ====
Week Sixteen: Seattle Seahawks vs. New York Jets – Game summary

Quarter	1	2	3	4	Total
Jets	3	0	0	0	3
Seahawks	0	7	3	3	13

at Qwest Field, Seattle

- Date: December 21
- Game time: 1:06pm local
- Game weather: snow, 31 °F (−1 °C), 60% humidity, wind SE 11 miles per hour (18 km/h)
- Game attendance: 68,161
- Referee: Tony Corrente
- TV announcers (CBS): Gus Johnson & Steve Tasker
- Gamecenter, Gamebook

Game information

First quarter

- NYJ – Jay Feely 20-yard field goal, 8:07. Jets 3–0. Drive: 13 plays, 78 yards, 6:53.

Second quarter

- SEA – John Carlson 2-yard pass from Seneca Wallace (Olindo Mare kick), 0:31. Seahawks 7–3. Drive: 7 plays, 40 yards, 2:49.

Third quarter

- SEA – Olindo Mare 31-yard field goal, 2:42. Seahawks 10–3. Drive: 13 plays, 74 yards, 6:58.

Fourth quarter

- SEA – Olindo Mare 38-yard field goal, 1:47. Seahawks 13–3. Drive: 4 plays, 0 yards, 0:25.

Top passers

- NYJ – Brett Favre: 18/31, 187 yds, 2 INT
- SEA – Seneca Wallace: 18/25, 175 yds, 1 TD

Top rushers

- NYJ – Thomas Jones: 17 car, 67 yds
- SEA – Maurice Morris: 29 car, 116 yds

Top receivers

- NYJ – Jerricho Cotchery: 6 rec, 81 yds
- SEA – Bobby Engram: 6 rec, 65 yds

Team – pass – rush – total – to

- NYJ – 150 – 115 – 265 – 2
- SEA – 175 – 120 – 295 – 2

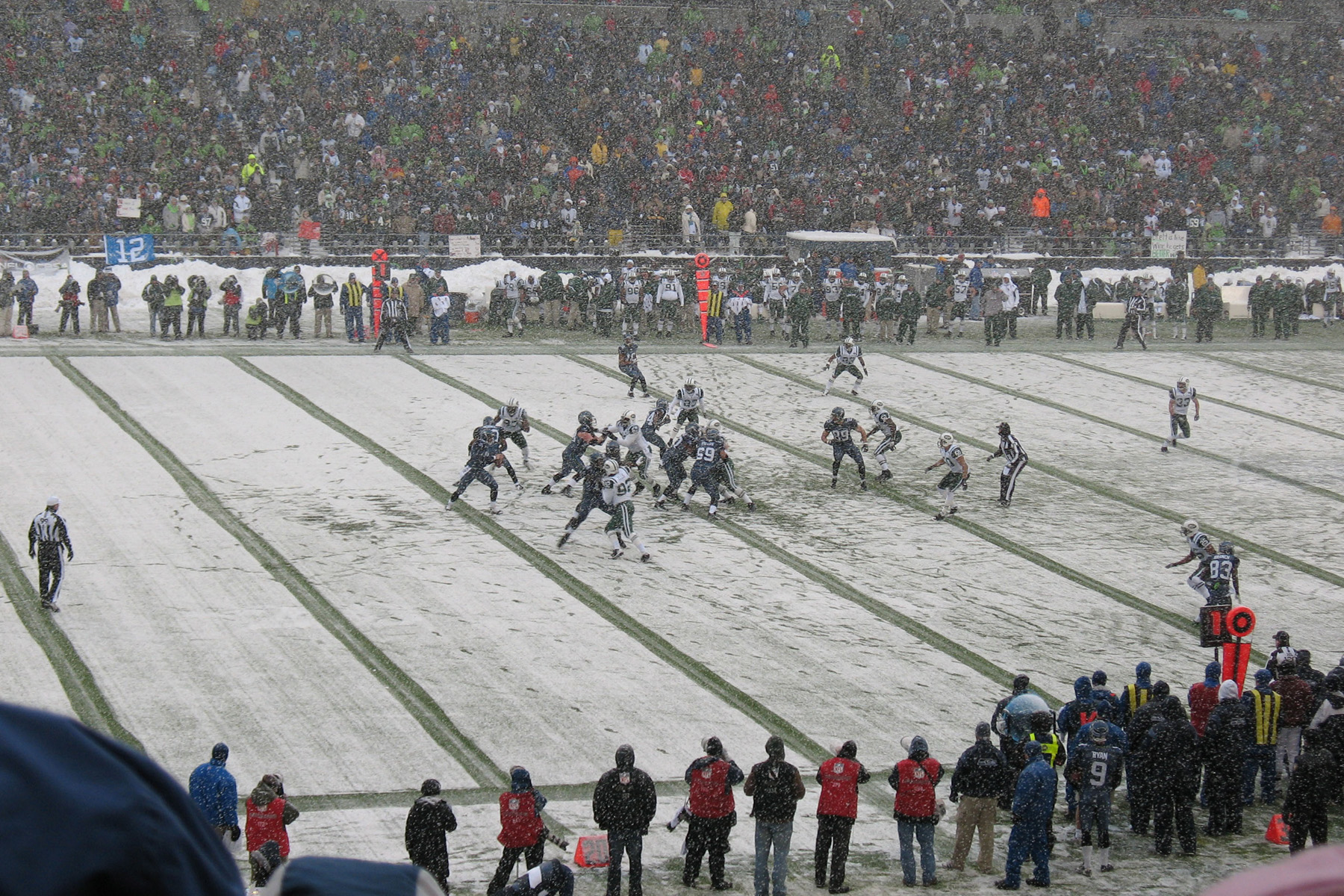
Seahawks vs. Jets, December 21, 2008

After snapping a six-game losing streak the previous week, the Seahawks went home for a Week 16 interconference duel with the New York Jets, in what would be Mike Holmgren's last home game as the franchise's head coach.

Seattle would trail in the first quarter as Jets kicker Jay Feely got a 20-yard field goal. The Seahawks would respond with quarterback Seneca Wallace completing a 2-yard touchdown pass to rookie tight end John Carlson.

In the second half, Seattle pulled away with kicker Olindo Mare's 31-yard field goal in the third quarter and a 38-yard field goal in the fourth quarter, while the defense would shut down New York's offense.

With the win, the Seahawks improved to 4–11. This was the only time during the season that the Seahawks won back-to-back games as well as their only win over a team with a winning record. This was also only the second ever Seahawks home game with snow falling.

==== Week 17: at Arizona Cardinals ====
Week Seventeen: Seattle Seahawks at Arizona Cardinals – Game summary

Quarter	1	2	3	4	Total
Seahawks	7	7	0	7	21
Cardinals	0	14	14	6	34

at University of Phoenix Stadium, Glendale, Arizona

- Date: December 28
- Game time: 1:15 pm local
- Game weather: indoors
- Game attendance: 63,874
- Referee: Mike Carey
- TV announcers (Fox): Thom Brennaman & Brian Billick
- Gamecenter, Gamebook

Game information

First quarter

- SEA – T. J. Duckett 1-yard run (Olindo Mare kick), 7:32. Seahawks 7–0. Drive: 12 plays, 64 yards, 6:15.

Second quarter

- ARI – Jerheme Urban 16-yard pass from Kurt Warner (Neil Rackers kick), 5:45. Tied 7–7. Drive: 4 plays, 68 yards, 1:25.
- ARI – Larry Fitzgerald 5-yard pass from Kurt Warner (Neil Rackers kick), 4:23. Cardinals 14–7. Drive: 2 plays, 12 yards, 0:53.
- SEA – Deion Branch 30-yard pass from Seneca Wallace (Olindo Mare kick), 1:17. Tied 14–14. Drive: 7 plays, 74 yards, 3:06.

Third quarter

- ARI – Larry Fitzgerald 38-yard pass from Kurt Warner (Neil Rackers kick), 8:43. Cardinals 21–14. Drive: 7 plays, 68 yards, 3:58.
- ARI – Steve Breaston 14-yard pass from Kurt Warner (Neil Rackers kick), 1:16. Cardinals 28–14. Drive: 9 plays, 68 yards, 3:58.

Fourth quarter

- SEA – Deion Branch 2-yard pass from Seneca Wallace (Olindo Mare kick), 12:04. Cardinals 28–21. Drive: 13 plays, 80 yards, 4:12.
- ARI – Neil Rackers 23-yard field goal, 8:26. Cardinals 31–21. Drive: 8 plays, 75 yards, 3:38.
- ARI – Neil Rackers 32-yard field goal, 3:28. Cardinals 34–21. Drive: 7 plays, 57 yards, 3:59.

Top passers

- SEA – Seneca Wallace: 24/43, 250 yds, 2 TD, 2 INT
- ARI – Kurt Warner: 19/30, 263 yds, 4 TD, 1 INT

Top rushers

- SEA – Maurice Morris: 15 car, 45 yds
- ARI – Edgerrin James: 14 car, 100 yds

Top receivers

- SEA – Deion Branch: 6 rec, 90 yds, 2 TD
- ARI – Larry Fitzgerald: 5 rec, 130 yds, 2 TD

Team – pass – rush – total – to

- SEA – 243 – 87 – 330 – 3
- ARI – 346 – 111 – 457 – 2

Coming off their home win over the Jets, the Seahawks closed out the Mike Holmgren era at the University of Phoenix Stadium in a Week 17 NFC West rematch with the Arizona Cardinals. Seattle would get the first quarter lead as running back T. J. Duckett got a 1-yard touchdown run. The Cardinals would take the lead in the second quarter as quarterback Kurt Warner completed a 16-yard touchdown pass to wide receiver Jerheme Urban and a 5-yard touchdown pass to wide receiver Larry Fitzgerald. The Seahawks tied the game prior to halftime as quarterback Seneca Wallace completed a 30-yard touchdown pass to wide receiver Deion Branch.

In the third quarter, Arizona retook the lead as Warner completed a 38-yard touchdown pass to Fitzgerald and a 14-yard touchdown pass to wide receiver Steve Breaston. Seattle tried to come back in the fourth quarter as Wallace hooked up with Branch again on a 2-yard touchdown pass, but the Cardinals closed out the game with kicker Neil Rackers nailing a 23-yard and a 32-yard field goal.

With the loss, the Seahawks' season ended at 4–12.
