= Lawrence Jackson =

American football player (born 1985)

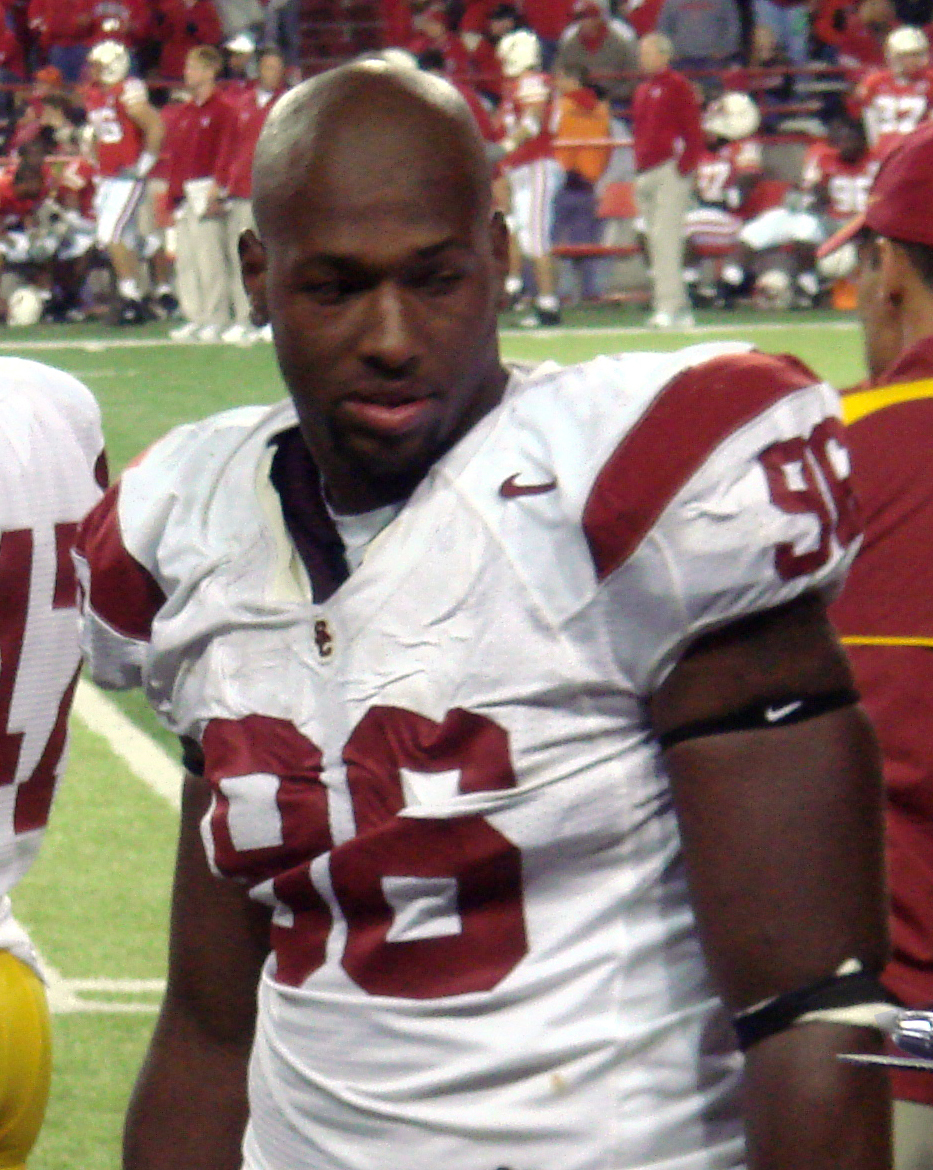
- Jackson with the USC Trojans in 2007

No. 95, 94
- Position: Defensive end

Personal information
- Born: August 30, 1985 (age 41); Los Angeles, California, U.S.
- Listed height: 6 ft 5 in (1.96 m)
- Listed weight: 261 lb (118 kg)

Career information
- High school: Inglewood (Inglewood, California)
- College: USC (2003–2007)
- NFL draft: 2008: 1st round, 28th overall pick

Career history
- Seattle Seahawks (2008–2009); Detroit Lions (2010–2012); Minnesota Vikings (2013)*
- * Offseason or practice squad member only

Awards and highlights
- Second-team All-American (2007); 2× First-team All-Pac-10 (2005, 2007); Second-team Team All-Pac-10 (2006)

Career NFL statistics
- Total tackles: 141
- Sacks: 19.5
- Forced fumbles: 4
- Fumble recoveries: 2
- Stats at Pro Football Reference

Lawrence Christopher Jackson (born August 30, 1985) is an American former professional football player who was a defensive end in the National Football League (NFL). He was selected by the Seattle Seahawks in the first round of the 2008 NFL draft. He played college football for the USC Trojans.

He is referred to as LJ or LoJack.

== Early life ==
Jackson played football and ran track at Inglewood High School in Inglewood, California. During his 2000 sophomore season, Inglewood advanced to the CIF Division X finals.

As a junior in 2001, he was All-City and All-League and his league's Defensive Player of the Year. He had 134 tackles, including 22 sacks, plus 2 interceptions (1 returned for a TD), 7 forced fumbles, 3 fumble recoveries and 3 blocked kicks in 2001. Inglewood made it to the 2001 CIF Division X semi-finals.

In 2002, Jackson was a consensus prep All-America, All-West, All-State, All-City and All-League selection as well as his league's MVP. He had 142 tackles, with 11 sacks, plus 4 fumble recoveries and 2 interceptions in 2002 while playing defensive line and middle linebacker.

For his career, he had 57 sacks. Jackson applied to be the head coach for Inglewood High School in 2014, losing out on the job to his former coach Jason Miller.

== College career ==
Jackson played college football for the University of Southern California and was a 4-year starter for the Trojans starting 51 of 52 games. Philip Rivers (NC State) is the only other player in NCAA history to start 51 games.

Jackson redshirted as a true freshman in 2003. He won USC's Service Team Defensive Player of the Year award. After the season, he had arthroscopic surgery on his right ankle to remove debris.

Jackson started at defensive end as a redshirt freshman in 2004. He played in 13 games (12 starts). He made the 2004 Collegefootballnews.com Freshman All-American first-team, The Sporting News and Rivals.com Freshman All-American second-teams. He had 32 tackles (11 for a loss) and 6 sacks.

He led the team with 10 sacks in 2005. He also had 46 tackles. He was a 2005 Rivals.com Third-team All-American. He was First-team All-Pac-10 and on ESPN's First-team All-Pac-10 team.

He was on the 2006 Lombardi Award, Bednarik Award and Bronko Nagurski Trophy watch lists and 2006 Athlon and Street & Smith's Walter Camp preseason All-American. He fell to Second-team Rivals.com and coaches All-Pac-10 in 2006. He totaled only 4 sacks in 2006, off from his first two years at USC.

In 2007 Jackson was an AP All-American second-team selection, Collegefootballnews.com All-American third-team, All-Pac-10 first-team (making it for the second time after being so honored in 2005), ESPN.com All-Pac-10 first-team, Collegefootballnews.com All-Pac-10 first-team, and the Rivals.com All-Pac-10 first-team. Jackson was on the 2007 Street and Smiths and Phil Steele's preseason All-American first-team and on the Ted Hendricks Award and Bednarik Award watch lists.

== Professional career ==
Pre-draft measurables
Height	Weight	40-yard dash	10-yard split	20-yard split	20-yard shuttle	Three-cone drill	Vertical jump	Broad jump	Bench press
6 ft 4 in (1.93 m)	271 lb (123 kg)	4.82 s	1.60 s	2.79 s	4.40 s	7.08 s	34 1/2 in (0.88 m)	9 ft 0 in (2.74 m)	31 reps
Vertical from USC Pro Day, all others from NFL Combine

=== Seattle Seahawks ===
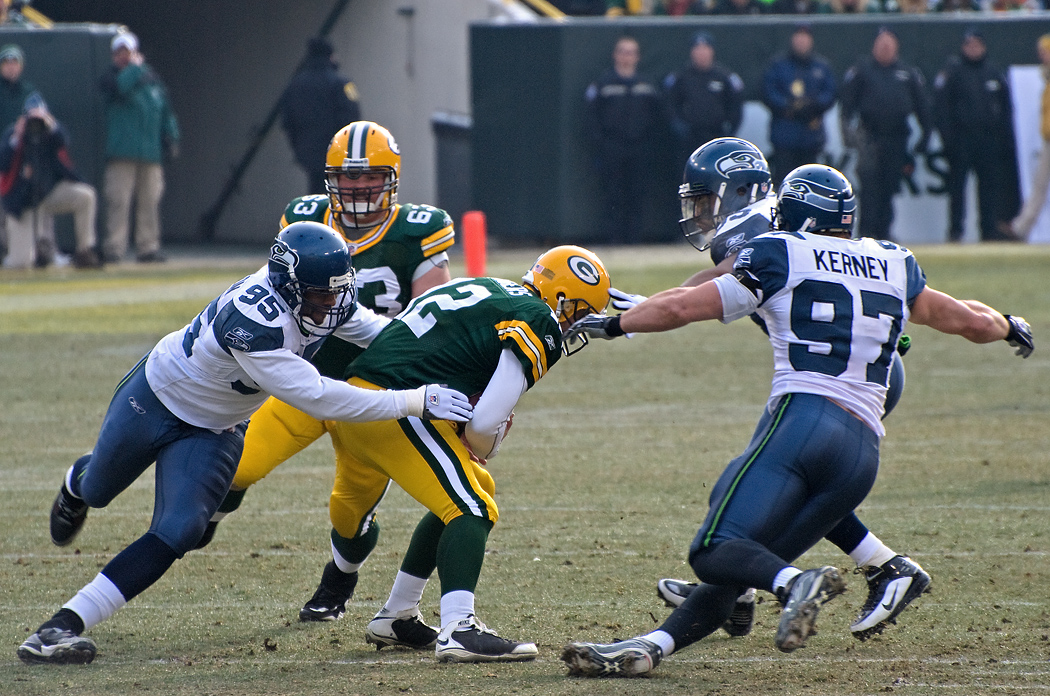
Lawrence Jackson and Patrick Kerney sacking Aaron Rodgers.

Jackson was selected in the first round with the 28th pick in the 2008 NFL draft by the Seattle Seahawks. He was the fourth defensive end taken in the first round (behind Chris Long, Vernon Gholston, and Derrick Harvey).

Jackson had a disappointing 2008 season as he finished with 29 tackles and two sacks. However, he did play every game of the season. After the season, Jackson said that he was looking to improve.

=== Detroit Lions ===
On August 18, 2010, Jackson was traded to the Detroit Lions for a 6th-round pick in the 2011 NFL draft.

Jackson finished the 2010 season with 34 tackles and 6 sacks, along with a forced fumble while playing only 11 games as the Lions finished 6–10.

Jackson was not able to replicate the same results in 2011 or 2012, posting a combined 46 tackles and 7 sacks over the two seasons.

== Career statistics ==
=== NFL ===
Year	Team	GP	COMB	TOTAL	AST	SACK	FF	FR	FR YDS	INT	IR YDS	AVG IR	LNG	TD	PD
2008	SEA	16	29	21	8	2.0	0	0	0	0	0	0	0	0	0
2009	SEA	16	32	27	5	4.5	2	0	0	0	0	0	0	0	2
2010	DET	11	34	21	13	6.0	1	1	0	0	0	0	0	0	1
2011	DET	11	26	17	9	4.5	0	1	0	0	0	0	0	0	0
2012	DET	15	20	11	9	2.5	1	0	0	0	0	0	0	0	0
Career		69	141	97	44	19.5	4	2	0	0	0	0	0	0	3

=== College ===
Year	Team	GP	GS	TT	T/L	Sacks	FR	PD	INT
2004	USC	13	12	32	11	6	0	1	1
2005	USC	13	13	46	13	10	2	7	0
2006	USC	13	13	43	11	4	1	5	1
2007	USC	13	13	60	17	10.5	1	3	0
Career		52	51	181	52	30.5	4	16	2
