= Lance Laury =

American football player (born 1982)

No. 47, 50, 56
- Position: Linebacker / Special teamer

Personal information
- Born: January 17, 1982 (age 44); Hopkins, South Carolina, U.S.
- Listed height: 6 ft 2 in (1.88 m)
- Listed weight: 237 lb (108 kg)

Career information
- College: South Carolina
- NFL draft: 2006: undrafted

Career history
- Seattle Seahawks (2006–2009); New York Jets (2010)

Career NFL statistics
- Total tackles: 78
- Forced fumbles: 2
- Fumble recoveries: 1
- Pass deflections: 1
- Stats at Pro Football Reference

Lance Laury (born January 17, 1982) is an American former professional football player who was a linebacker in the National Football League (NFL). He played college football for the South Carolina Gamecocks and was signed by the Seattle Seahawks as an undrafted free agent in 2006.

Laury has also played for the New York Jets.

== Early life ==
Laury attended Lower Richland High School and was a student and a letterman in football and baseball. In football, he was a two-time All-Conference selection. Laury still owns the Lower Richland record for the most single season tackles with 201 in 11 games.

Laury was selected by the Chicago Cubs during the 2000 MLB draft in the 48th round as a center fielder.

== Professional career ==
=== Seattle Seahawks ===
On November 12, 2006, Laury was signed to the active roster from the practice squad after Marcus Tubbs was placed on injured reserve. He played for them until 2009.

=== New York Jets ===
Laury signed with the New York Jets on March 19, 2010.
