= Kevin Brown (defensive tackle) =

American football player (born 1985)

Profile
- Position: Defensive tackle

Personal information
- Born: July 8, 1985 (age 41); Los Angeles, California, U.S.
- Listed height: 6 ft 2 in (1.88 m)
- Listed weight: 303 lb (137 kg)

Career information
- College: UCLA
- NFL draft: 2008: undrafted

Career history
- Seattle Seahawks (2008–2009)*
- * Offseason or practice squad member only

Kevin A. Brown (born July 8, 1985) is an American former football defensive tackle. He played college football at UCLA from 2003 to 2008, although he missed the 2005 season due to an ankle injury. He was signed by the Seattle Seahawks as an undrafted free agent in 2008.
